= Young & Gettin' It =

Single by Meek Mill featuring Kirko Bangz

from the album Dreams and Nightmares
- Released: September 19, 2012
- Recorded: 2012
- Genre: Trap
- Length: 3:26
- Label: 215 Aphillyated; Maybach; Warner Bros.
- Songwriters: Robert Williams; Orlando Tucker; Kirk Randle; Vincent Robinson
- Producer: Jahlil Beats

Meek Mill singles chronology
"Burn" (2012)	"Young & Gettin' It" (2012)	"Bad Ass" (2013)

Kirko Bangz singles chronology
"Drank in My Cup" (2011)	"Young & Gettin' It" (2012)	"Keep It Trill" (2012)

Music video
- "Young & Gettin' It" on YouTube

"Young & Gettin' It" is a song by American rapper Meek Mill from his debut studio album, Dreams and Nightmares (2012). The song features a guest appearance from fellow rapper Kirko Bangz. It was produced by Jahlil Beats, who served as a co-writer with the rappers and Vincent Robinson. On September 19, 2012, Maybach Music Group and Warner Bros. Records released the song as the album's third single. A club-influenced track with Auto-Tune usage for Mill and Kirko Bangz, it sees the former celebrating his successes.

"Young & Gettin' It" received mixed reviews from music critics, who were divided in their assessments of the subject matter. Its composition garnered some praise, though the Auto-Tune usage was often criticized. In the United States, the song charted at number 86 on the Billboard Hot 100 and number 25 on the Hot R&B/Hip-Hop Songs chart. It was certified gold in the country by the Recording Industry Association of America. An accompanying music video was released on October 28, 2012, which shows Mill partying with Kirko Bangz on a Royal Caribbean and them venturing into Miami. In November 2012, the song was performed live by the rappers and the Roots on Late Night with Jimmy Fallon, with scratches from Funkmaster Flex.

== Background and composition ==
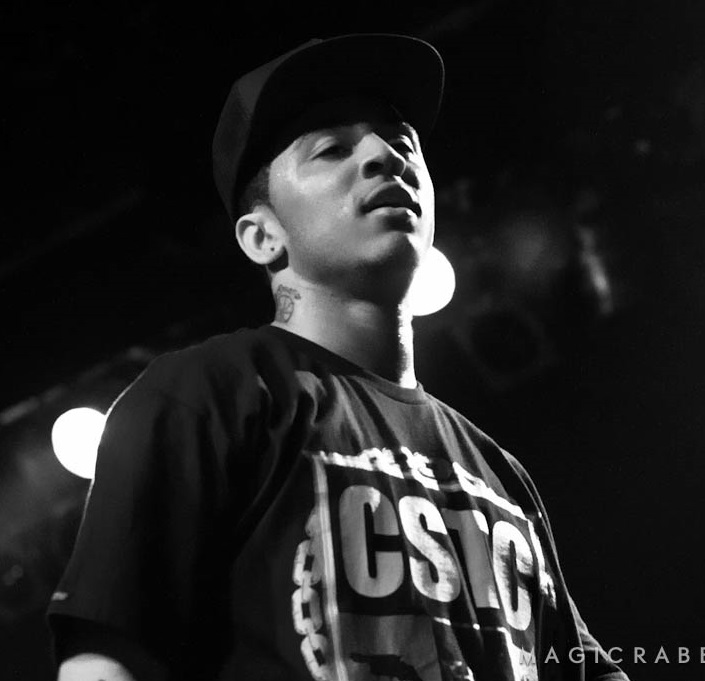
The song features a guest appearance from Kirko Bangz on the hook.

"Young & Gettin' It" was solely produced by record producer Jahlil Beats, who had frequently produced songs for Mill in the past. The song was written by Mill, Jahlil Beats, Kirko Bangz, and Vincent Robinson. Jahlil Beats was first introduced to the rapper over Myspace, and contributed productions to his mixtapes Flamers 2: Hottest In Tha City (2009) and Dreamchasers 2 (2012). "Young & Gettin' It" marked Mill's first instance of using Auto-Tune. The song was recorded during the initial sessions for Dreams and Nightmares in 2012 and after its release in September, Mill started working on the title track.

Musically, "Young & Gettin' It" is a club-influenced track. Throughout the song, Mill raps in his usual high pitch, while both him and Kirko Bangz deploy Auto-Tune. In the lyrics of the song, Mill celebrates his fame and wealth. He also discusses the strength to sell drugs. Kirko Bangz sings the hook, contributing his signature melodies. Mill uses certain lyrics to boast of his lifestyle, such as "These niggas claimin' they ballin'/ I take your bitch, Kris Humphries".

== Release and reception ==
On September 19, 2012, "Young & Gettin' It" was released by Maybach and Warner Bros. as the album's third single and the first one not from any of Mill's mixtapes. It was successful on radio stations in the United States. "Young & Gettin' It" was later included as the third track of Mill's debut studio album Dreams and Nightmares on October 30. The song was met with mixed reviews from music critics, with split feelings of its subject matter. Rap-Up author Devin wrote that Mill "stacks his paper and lives it up on the carefree anthem", while Ghøst of OnSmash predicted it to become an "anthem for all the youngins ... com[ing] up making that money, straight hustler music". Writing for AllMusic, David Jeffries called it a "hooky swagger anthem". At Stereogum, Corban Goble described the song as "a radio-aiming jam".

In a mixed review, the staff of XXL assumed that the song lacks Mill's lyrical dedication from the Maybach compilations and his Dreamchasers mixtape series of the early 2010s, noting he delivers "aimless lines". The staff wrote off Mill's usage of Auto-Tune and concluded that the song remains "as a guilty pleasure, but nonetheless stands as a lowbrow moment". Reviewing for the Vibe daily list of September 19, 2012, Keenan Higgins was particularly disappointed with the Auto-Tune and said that "Young & Gettin' It" seems "annoying rather than enjoyable", yet acknowledged its club appeal. PopMatters editor Matthew Fiander assured that the song is one of the album's "safe choices", believing "you're bound to get ear fatigue" by repeatedly listening to the subjects of money and drugs. Spin's Mosi Reeves felt that "Kirko Bangz hijacks 'Young & Gettin' It'", contributing a basic imitation of Canadian musician Drake. Edwin Ortiz from HipHopDX thought the song pales in comparison to Mill's successes, singling out its "aimless rhymes and an insufferable hook from Kirko Bangz".

"Young & Gettin' It" debuted at number 95 on the US Billboard Hot 100 for the issue date of November 10, 2012. The song left the Hot 100 the following week, before later peaking at number 86 on the chart issue dated January 12, 2013. It lasted for 10 weeks on the Hot 100. The song entered the US Hot R&B/Hip-Hop Songs chart at number 72 for the issue dated October 6, 2012, five weeks before peaking at number 25 on the chart, which it spent 19 weeks on. The track further reached number 18 on the US Hot Rap Songs chart. On July 20, 2017, "Young & Gettin' It" was awarded a gold certification by the Recording Industry Association of America for pushing 500,000 certified units in the US.

== Music video and promotion ==
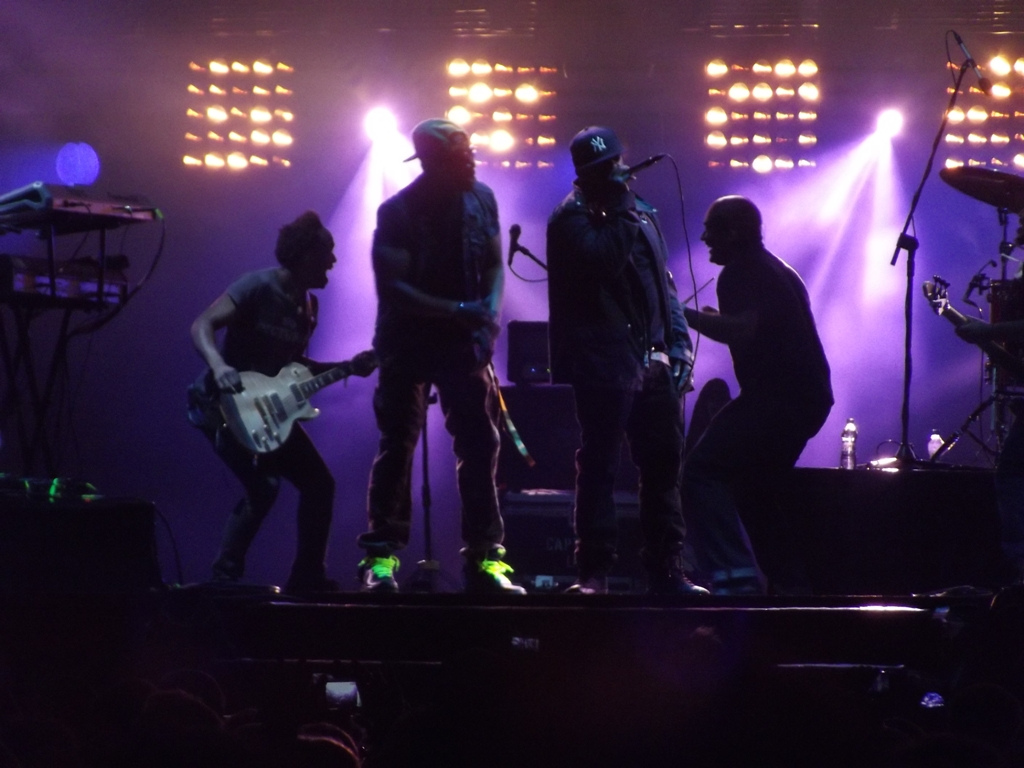
For the song's performance on Late Night with Jimmy Fallon in November 2012, an acoustic touch was added by the Roots.

On September 28, 2012, the music video for "Young & Gettin' It" was shot in Miami by Dre Films. The music video premiered via MTV on October 28. At the beginning, Mill and Kirko Bangz showcase their jewelry and footwear, respectively. The two then party with semi-naked women on a yacht, where Mill flaunts his money. They are shown on beaches and riding speedboats, before the scene transitions to Miami. There, Mill drives around in a Rolls-Royce car, while Kirko Bangz uses a Ferrari. The rappers arrive at a craps table and roll the dice, which is followed by them opening champagne bottles at a club. For the conclusion, this scene transitions back to the yacht party.

At the 2012 BET Hip Hop Awards, Mill transitioned into a performance of the song from fellow Dreams and Nightmares single "Amen", bringing out Kirko Bangz. Flames erupted on stage for the start of it and Mill wore a black sweater with leather sleeves, sunglasses, and various jewelry items, including a jesus piece. On November 12, 2012, Mill and Kirko Bangz performed an acoustic-tinged version of "Young & Gettin' It" on Late Night with Jimmy Fallon with the house band the Roots. The performance marked Mill's debut on the show and for the hook, DJ Funkmaster Flex contributed scratches.

== Credits and personnel ==
Information taken from Dreams and Nightmares liner notes.

Mastering

- Mastered at Chris Athens Masters, Austin, TX and WEA Studios, Burbank, CA

Personnel

- Meek Mill – songwriter
- Jahlil Beats – songwriter, producer
- Kirk Randle – songwriter
- Vincent Robinson – songwriter
- Chris Athens – mastering
- Justin Smith – mastering

== Charts ==
Chart performance for "Young & Gettin' It"
Chart (2012–13)	Peak position
US Billboard Hot 100	86
US Hot R&B/Hip-Hop Songs (Billboard)	25
US Hot Rap Songs (Billboard)	18

== Certifications ==
Certifications for "Young & Gettin' It"
Region	Certification	Certified units/sales
United States (RIAA)	Gold	500,000^{‡}
^{‡} Sales+streaming figures based on certification alone.
