= Believe It (Meek Mill song) =

Single by Meek Mill featuring Rick Ross

from the album Dreams and Nightmares
- Released: February 19, 2013
- Recorded: 2012
- Length: 3:59
- Label: 215 Aphillyated; Maybach; Warner Bros.
- Songwriters: Robert Williams; Roshun Walker; William Roberts II
- Producer: Young Shun

Meek Mill singles chronology
"Bad Ass" (2013)	"Believe It" (2013)	"Levels" (2013)

Rick Ross singles chronology
"Millions" (2013)	"Believe It" (2013)	"U.O.E.N.O." (2013)

Music video
- "Believe It" on YouTube

"Believe It" is a song by American rapper Meek Mill from his debut studio album, Dreams and Nightmares (2012). The song features a guest appearance from fellow rapper Rick Ross. It was produced by Young Shun, who served as a songwriter alongside the rappers. The song was released to US urban contemporary radio stations as the fourth and final single from the album on February 19, 2013, through Maybach Music Group and Warner Bros. Records. Lyrically, it has themes of struggle and triumph.

"Believe It" received lukewarm reviews from music critics. While Mill's performance was mostly praised, Rick Ross's appearance garnered a more mixed reception and a few critics observed a lack of originality. The song reached numbers 22 and 38 on the US Billboard Bubbling Under Hot 100 and Hot R&B/Hip-Hop Songs charts, respectively. In March 2013, an accompanying music video premiered on MTV. The video sees Mill and Rick Ross make a business transaction in a desert, before driving to Las Vegas for partying. The rappers performed the song live for Rip the Runway in February 2013.

== Background and composition ==
In 2010, Rick Ross signed Meek Mill to his label Maybach and the parent company Warner Bros. after he impressed him at a college gig. Later that year, the two first worked together on a re-recording of Mill's 2009 track "Rosé Red". Rick Ross contributed features to tracks of Mill's eighth and ninth mixtapes Dreamchasers and Dreamchasers 2 in 2011 and 2012, respectively. Mill subsequently recorded and released Dreams and Nightmares in 2012, featuring guest appearances by the rapper on "Believe It", "Maybach Curtains", and "Lay Up". After Mill alleged during a social media rant in 2021 that a record label had not paid him, Rick Ross assumed it was his other label Atlantic and assured they had not fallen out. Rick Ross also declared that the two had "been down 10 years" and in November 2022, he performed with the rapper at the 10th anniversary concert of the album.

"Believe It" was produced by Young Shun, who co-wrote it with Mill and Rick Ross. Lyrically, the song is themed around struggle and triumph. On the chorus, Rick Ross references American singer Miley Cyrus and Canadian singer Justin Bieber; the latter is a metaphor that was interpreted by Mosi Reeves from Spin as the cocaine he sells being white like Bieber. Mill recalls his time as a drug dealer and his time in the hood, as well as boasting of his wealth. Rick Ross uses a metaphor to warn anyone who acts unacceptable: "Don't want no beef?/ I may crack your taco."

== Release and promotion ==
Mill shared the song online on October 25, 2012. Five days later, "Believe It" was released as the fifth track on Mill's debut studio album Dreams and Nightmares. In February 2013, Mill told Vibe on the red carpet at the 55th Annual Grammy Awards that the song was set for release as a single and a music video was in production. On February 19, it was serviced to urban contemporary radio stations as the album's fourth and final single by Maybach and Warner Bros.

The song's music video premiered via MTV on March 24, 2013, and was directed by Dre Films. The video begins with Mill and Rick Ross in a desert, both of whom wear suits. The rappers make a business transaction and blacked-out cars also appear, which are shown alongside them and being driven in the desert. Mill and Rick Ross then drive from the desert to Las Vegas, where they party at a casino. The rappers are joined by women and toss their money around, before they later go clubbing in the city. In February 2013, Mill and Rick Ross performed "Believe It" for the ninth annual edition of BET's show Rip the Runway at Hammerstein Ballroom in New York City, which aired on the network a month later.

== Reception ==
"Believe It" was met with lukewarm reviews from music critics, with general praise for Mill's performance. Hypebeast's Richard Brooks said Mill and Rick Ross meet expectations over the instrumentation, concluding that "the hard-hitting track is sure to [be] on repeat" in many vehicles upon the album's release. Michael Depland from MTV highlighted Mill's lyrics about success and how Rick Ross quickly "let[s] you know when you've crossed the line" with the taco lyrics. The staff of XXL assured that Mill is "living the dream" when Rick Ross appears on "the rollicking [track]". Writing for Pitchfork, Jordan Sagent thought that Mill's struggle and triumph on the song are "plainly articulated" and could be felt, saying this feels "eminently vital" and it is among the album's best tracks. Rap-Up author Devin thought the production makes for a "street banger", while highlighting Mill's vocals. For Consequence, Michael Madden picked the song as one of the best tracks on Dreams and Nightmares.

Prefix Mag's Charlie Kaplan named the song as one of the album's better ones, chronicling that Mill is able to "hit the track hard and tear it apart", although he saw it as relatively "standard fare" with Rick Ross delivering "some patently ridiculous references" to Cyrus and Bieber alongside Mill handling the duty of cleanup. Edwin Ortiz was more critical in HipHopDX, explaining the song follows "in the formulaic standard" that was to Mill's success on Maybach's Self Made releases, yet merely manages to provide "enough satisfaction for a repeat listen". In a somewhat negative review at AllHipHop, K1ng Eljay was similarly disappointed that the song "suffers from the same topics" Mill had previously discussed and is sonically the same as his earlier Rick Ross collaborations "Tupac Back" (2011) and "Black Magic" (2012). Reeves believed that Mill recruits Rick Ross to "belly-flop over 'Believe It' and drop unintelligible metaphors" to help pay his bills.

Commercially, "Believe It" experienced a minor reception. Upon the release of the album, the song peaked at number 22 on the US Billboard Bubbling Under Hot 100 Singles chart. The song also spend two weeks on the US Hot R&B/Hip-Hop Songs chart, which it reached number 38 on.

== Charts ==
Chart performance for "Believe It"
Chart (2012)	Peak position
US Bubbling Under Hot 100 (Billboard)	22
US Hot R&B/Hip-Hop Songs (Billboard)	38
