= Dreams and Nightmares =

Studio album by Meek Mill
- Released: October 30, 2012
- Recorded: January – September 2012
- Genre: Hip-hop
- Length: 56:36
- Labels: Maybach; Warner Bros.
- Producers: Tone the Beat Bully; Black Metaphor; Jahlil Beats; Boi-1da; Young Shun; Infamous; The-Agency; Key Wane; Lee Major; Kane Beatz; TBHits; Travis Sayles; Cardiak; Kenoe; Got Koke; The Renegades

Meek Mill chronology
Dreamchasers 2 (2012)	Dreams and Nightmares (2012)	Dreamchasers 3 (2013)

Singles from Dreams and Nightmares
- 1. "Amen" Released: June 19, 2012; 2. "Burn" Released: September 11, 2012; 3. "Young & Gettin' It" Released: September 19, 2012; 4. "Believe It" Released: February 19, 2013

Dreams and Nightmares is the debut studio album by American rapper Meek Mill, released on October 30, 2012, by Maybach Music Group and Warner Bros. Records. Mill intended for it to be authentic and more cohesive than his mixtapes, having a stronger connection through both vocals and beats. The album features guest appearances from Kirko Bangz, Rick Ross, Nas, John Legend, Drake, Wale, and Mary J. Blige, among others. Production was primarily handled by Jahlil Beats and Boi-1da, alongside the likes of Tone the Beat Bully and Key Wane. The recording took place from January to September 2012, including sessions in a studio bus on the Club Paradise Tour. Sessions were also held in Los Angeles and Miami, and multiple recordings were included on Mill's ninth mixtape, Dreamchasers 2 (2012). The dreams represent Mill making money as a performer, while the nightmares are based on coming up from his neighborhood.

"Amen" was released as the lead single in June 2012, followed by "Burn" and "Young & Gettin' It" later that year, before "Believe It" in early 2013. Music videos were produced for all of the releases, while the lead single and "Young & Gettin' It" both charted on the US Billboard Hot 100. Mill embarked on the Dreamchasers Tour for further promotion in August 2012, performing at 16 cities in the United States. Dreams and Nightmares received generally positive reviews from music critics, who mostly commended Mill's development into mainstream rap. Some praised his rapping, while a few critics highlighted the dreams theme. The album was named to 2012 year-end lists by multiple publications, including Rap Radar and The Source.

Dreams and Nightmares debuted at number two on the Billboard 200, selling 165,000 copies in the first week in the US. It has since been certified gold in the country by the Recording Industry Association of America (RIAA). The album reached numbers six and five on the Canadian Albums and UK R&B Albums charts, respectively. In November 2022, Mill held a 10th anniversary concert at the Wells Fargo Center, beginning with footage throughout his career and featuring appearances from the likes of Fabulous, Fivio Foreign, and Rick Ross.

== Background and recording ==
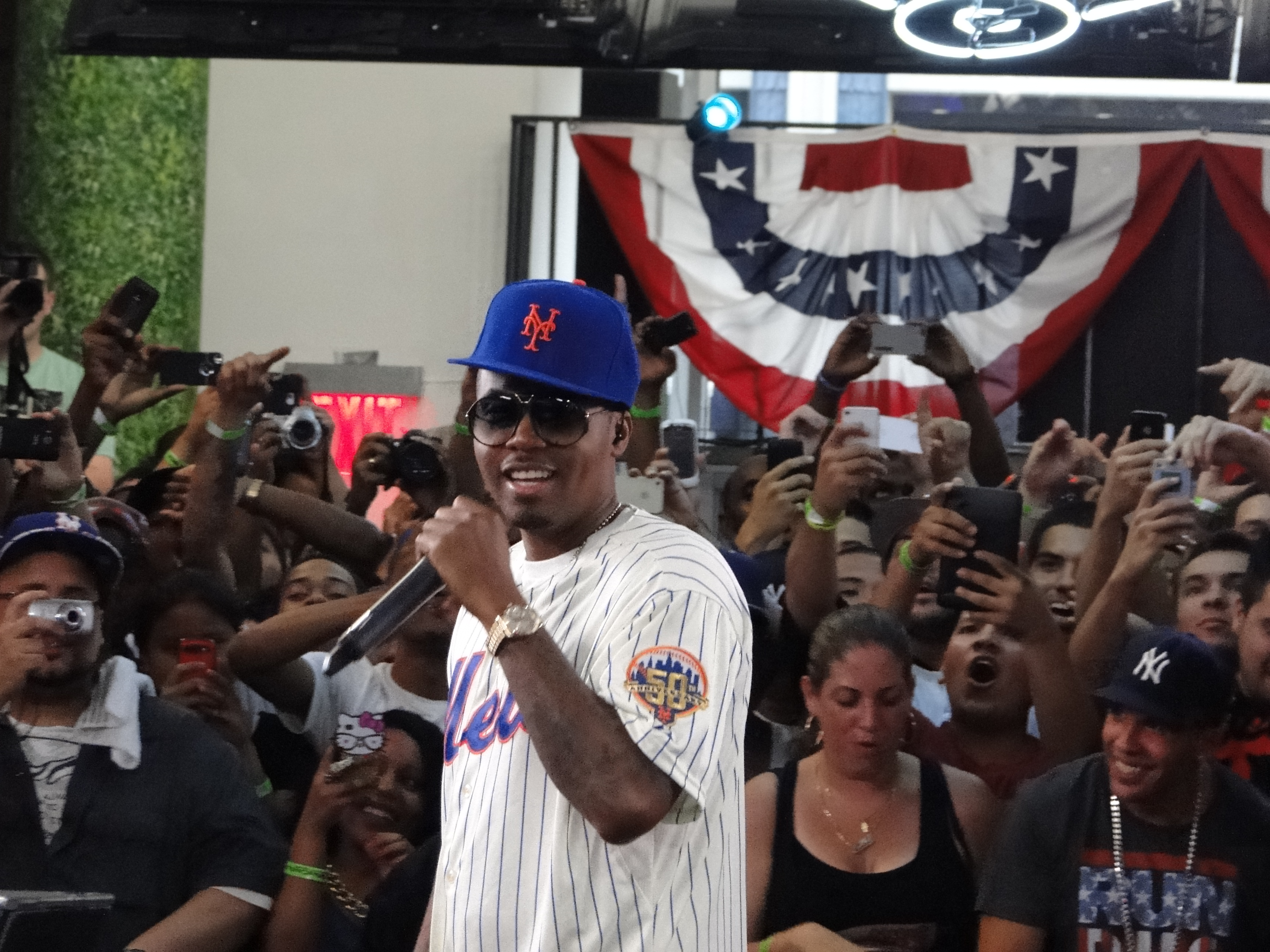
Prior to the album's release, Mill announced an appearance from fellow rapper Nas, who gave praise to his work.

In late January 2012, Mill announced his debut album to Hot 97 host Angie Martinez, with a release planned for the summer of 2012. The following month, Mill revealed the album's title to be Dreams and Nightmares in a vlog. Mill released his ninth mixtape Dreamchasers 2 on May 7, 2012, in the lead-up to Dreams and Nightmares. That same month, Mill declared backstage to MTV News to expect from the album "quality music and you're gonna get the real me", explaining it would not "be all over the place" like his mixtapes. He elaborated that he was going to establish a connection, trying to "perfect my craft a little more", assuring his flows blend better with the beats and these have more clarity. Mill was hopeful to include guest appearances from fellow rappers French Montana and Rick Ross, yet still insisted some features would be a surprise. In a May 2012 interview for The Juice, he added that the rappers featured would depend on how the unfinished tracks felt: "If I have a song that sounds like it fits Nicki Minaj the best or it fits T.I. the best, that's the people I would sort of lean towards getting on them songs. But it depends on how the songs fit the person."

Dreams and Nightmares features production on numerous tracks from record producer Jahlil Beats, who was first introduced to Mill via Myspace. He had previously contributed to Mill's Flamers 2: Hottest In Tha City (2009) and Dreamchasers 2, becoming a frequent collaborator of the rapper. Jahlil Beats said of collaborating that their chemistry "was destined to happen", emphasizing how well his drums and Mill's flow blend together. Jamaician-Canadian record producer Boi-1da produced the tracks "Traumatized" and "Tony Story Pt. 2", while production was also contributed by the likes of Tone the Beat Bully, Young Shun, Infamous, The-Agency, and Key Wane. In early August 2012, Hip-Hop Wired reported that the album's release date was postponed from August 28 to late October 2012. That same month, Mill implored to Wild 94.9 that he desired to stay true to hip hop and have a "classic album" comparable to the likes of Nas' Illmatic (1994), Jay-Z's Vol. 2... Hard Knock Life (1998), and 50 Cent's Get Rich or Die Tryin' (2003). Nas voiced his approval of Mill, "I got my eyes on him. He's the next one to take this shit over."

In early October 2012, Mill shared the track list for Dreams and Nightmares, which showed the two bonus tracks. Around the same time, Mill revealed that major musical acts like Nas, Rick Ross, John Legend, and Mary J. Blige were set to be featured. He also announced an appearance from fellow rapper and Maybach signee Wale, who described Mill as being in a "special moment" when wanting to make history. At the end of October 2012, Mill was detained by the Philadelphia Police Department on his way to the album's listening party. The department could not disclose the reasoning, though he was angry at having to share handcuffs with the Rolex watch on his wrist for the cover art. Mill explained the conception of Dreams and Nightmares, detailing that the dreams represent "being on tour and television, gettin' paid for doing what I love to do", while "the nightmares was just makin' it to this point, the hard work and bein' in the streets". He elaborated that there was darker incidents during his younger years in Philadelphia, alluding to acts he considered bad and unspecified violence.

In January 2012, the recording process for the album began. This continued as Mill embarked on the Dreamchasers Tour and promoted Dreamchasers 2, releasing some of the recordings on the mixtape. As him and fellow rapper Nipsey Hussle listened to beats from American-Jamaican musician Sean Kingston in the studio, Mill came up with song lyrics. American record producer Spiff brought in a batch of 80 beats, while Jahlil Beats noted Mill's high level of energy that culminates in "some crossover records" and "a few fast records". In May 2012, Mill stated that he was recording between two and three songs a day in a studio he had recently installed on his bus for Canadian musician Drake's Club Paradise Tour. The rapper said that although none of the tracks had been made final for Dreams and Nightmares, his collaboration "Maybach Curtains" with Nas had a possibility of appearing. Footage of the rappers in a Los Angeles studio that same month showed him playing two tracks from the album that Nas appreciated, including "Maybach Curtains". In July 2012, the track was leaked to the internet. A month prior, Mill was joined in his recording bus by major rap acts like Wale, French Montana, and J. Cole. Rick Ross gave studio advice to Mill of making the tracks feel perfect and part of a cohesive record; he responded by freestyling and telling fellow rapper the Game it was "that feeling". In early September 2012, Mill relocated to a Miami studio for the final recording sessions, including the title track "Dreams and Nightmares".

== Music and lyrics ==
Dreams and Nightmares is a hip hop album, incorporating elements of orchestral and pop music. The album frequently utilizes piano, which The A.V. Club's Evan Rytlewski called "a softer template" than Mill's mixtapes. Jordan Sargent of Pitchfork described Dreams and Nightmares as "distinct in both voice and sound", observing it is "tense and dramatic" through the variations of piano and Mill's rapping. Some reviews considered the music to be formulaic; PopMatters' Matthew Fiander said Mill aims for commercial success over creativity and is accompanied by "the machinations of Maybach [like] overdone beats". David Jeffries from AllMusic depicted the album as disorganized with less care than a mixtape, yet thought that "sliced off into little bits, this is the glittery gangster feeling" to be expected for Maybach. Multiple publications noted Mill's loud delivery, with Fiander and the staff of XXL believing that he yells throughout.

Mill summarized Dreams and Nightmares: "The dream part is me living as an artist making money touring across the world, and nightmares touches on everything that it took for me to make it from the streets." The album features Mill reflecting on his earlier struggles in life, showing how he became credible and juxtaposing these with his current situation. He tells his story of reaching triumph from the struggles, including crime, drug dealing, and growing up in a rough urban area. Mill expresses a desire for money and disregard for the associated fame, albeit acknowledging his wealth is tainted by how it was earnt. He also boasts of his lifestyle, while maintaining his dedication and grit. The rapper ventures between dreams and nightmares, which are represented by his successes and inner demons, respectively.

== Songs ==
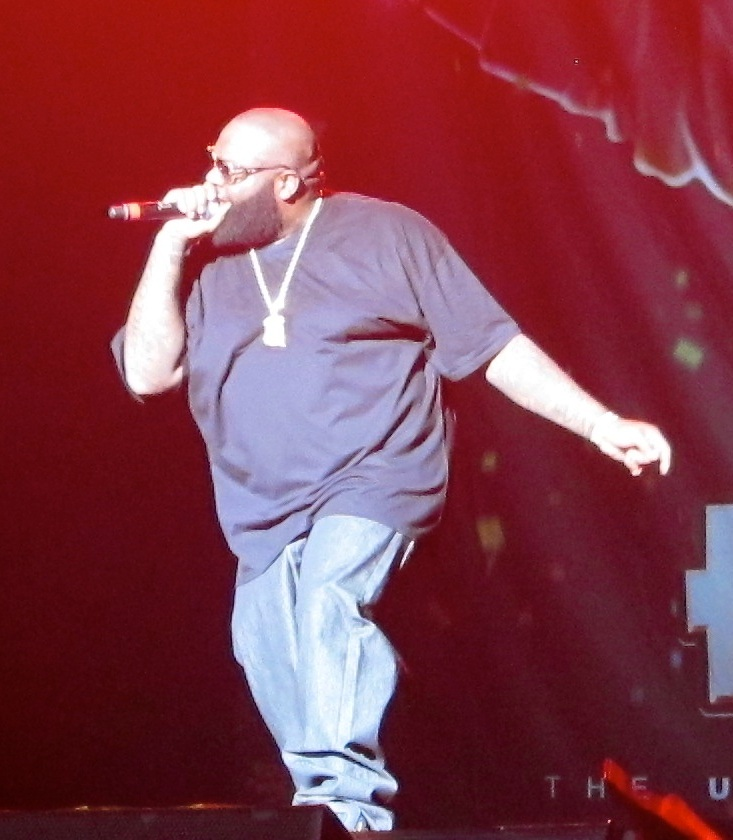
Rick Ross is featured on numerous tracks, including the single "Believe It".

Dreams and Nightmares begins with the title track, which relies on piano stabs and strings. The track has a beat switch in the middle to transition from the dreams to the nightmares portion; Mill changes from celebrating victory to rapping angrily about issues in his past. "In God We Trust" features a maximalist beat, over which Mill raps forcefully about killing a man. "Young & Gettin' It" contains elements of club and usage of Auto-Tune, with lyrics about the strength to sell drugs from Mill and a hook from fellow rapper Kirko Bangz. Soul elements, hallow chimes, and filtered moans back Mill hypothesizing a conversation warning his father's murderer he will kill him on "Traumatized", expressing loss and regret. "Believe It" begins with Rick Ross referencing Miley Cyrus and Justin Bieber, before Mill touches on struggle and triumph. Rick Ross appears on the next track "Maybach Curtains", alongside Nas' guest verse and crooning from Legend. The track features pop and R&B elements, and Mill recalls drug dealing. "Amen" maintains these elements and has a gospel beat, alongside Mill and Drake discussing sexual exploitation and excessive wealth.

On "Young Kings", Mill recalls the pressure of drug dealing, as well as lamenting his father's death and expressing "fuck fame" to focus on his money. "Lay Up" is a pop slow jam that sees him reference admiration of his status, featuring Wale showing off to women and an appearance from Rick Ross. "Tony Story Pt. 2" serves as a sequel to the track from Mill's 2011 mixtape Dreamchasers and utilizes windshield wipers as percussion, with the rapper telling the story of gunplay leading into the tragedy of death. "Who You're Around" features Mill meditating on damaged personal friendships, joined by Blige on the chorus. On "Polo & Shell Tops", Mill raps about resorting to selling crack cocaine to earn money and get revenge on others. "Rich & Famous" is a pop track, which includes Mill speaking of material wealth and spending time with a woman. On "Real Niggas Come First", Mill reminisces on drug dealing. "Burn" is an up-tempo number, which sees Mill and fellow rapper Big Sean perform back and forth. "Freak Show" is a club number set in a similar tempo, featuring rapper 2 Chainz and DJ Sam Sneaker, with a refrain referencing fellatio.

== Release and promotion ==
At the start of October 2012, Mill shared the cover art for the album. The artwork uses Mill's gold Rolex watch for symbolizing dreams, alongside handcuffs for nightmares. Complex named the album cover the 18th best of 2012. At the 2012 BET Hip Hop Awards, Mill performed "Amen" and "Young & Gettin' It". During the months leading up to October, Mill played the album for Jay-Z and appreciated the feedback from someone of his status, getting along well with him personally. In mid-October 2012, Mill and Rick Ross previewed it at Electric Lady Studios in NYC for rappers such as Jay-Z, Will Smith, and Wale, as well as singers Estelle and The-Dream. Mill declared that he was staying true to his early days with "In God We Trust", delivering "that hard street shit" unlike much of mainstream rap. At the premiere, Rick Ross said about Mill: "I'm proud of my homie. Everything he has accomplished, he earned himself."

On October 19, 2012, Mill premiered "Maybach Curtains". The next week, he appeared on MTV's weekly show RapFix Live to promote Dreams and Nightmares, performing his scrapped second verse from the song. Hours before his appearance, the album leaked online and Mill responded by telling host Sway Calloway, "I ain't tripping. If people wanna buy your album, they're gonna buy your album whether it's gonna leak or not." Dreams and Nightmares was released on October 30, 2012, through Mill's labels Maybach and Warner Bros. The deluxe version was released simultaneously, featuring "Burn" and "Freak Show". A day after the album's release, Mill held a release party in Atlanta, arriving on time after being detained. On January 27, 2013, a music video for the title track was released, documenting Mill's career up to Dreams and Nightmares.

=== Singles ===
"Amen" was released for digital download and streaming as the lead single from Dreams and Nightmares on June 19, 2012, by Maybach and Warner Bros. A month earlier, the song had been included on Dreamchasers 2. The song's music video was released on June 15, 2012, interspersing footage of Mill and Drake partying late at night with clips of the Club Paradise Tour. "Amen" reached number 57 on the US Billboard Hot 100, and it was later certified gold by the Recording Industry Association of America (RIAA) for pushing 500,000 certified units in the United States in July 2015. "Burn" was released to download and streaming formats in the US as the second single on September 11, 2012, through Mill's labels. Like "Amen", the song was first released on the mixtape. An accompanying music video premiered on October 10, 2012, which features Mill and Big Sean accompanied by models and exploding cars inside a warehouse. The song topped the Billboard Bubbling Under Hot 100 Singles chart. "Burn" was awarded a gold certification from the RIAA for amassing 500,000 certified units in the US in May 2019.

On September 19, 2012, "Young & Gettin' It" was released as the third single from Dreams and Nightmares and the first one not from the mixtape. The song's music video was debuted on September 28, showing Mill and Kirko Bangz partying on a yacht, before changing to Miami. "Young & Gettin' It" reached number 95 on the Billboard Hot 100, and it was certified gold by the RIAA for shelving 500,000 certified units in July 2017. On February 19, 2013, "Believe It" was sent to US urban contemporary radio stations as the album's fourth and final single by Maybach and Warner Bros. An accompanying music video premiered on March 24, beginning with Mill and Rick Ross making a business transaction in the desert and then partying in Las Vegas. The song peaked at number 22 on the Billboard Bubbling Under Hot 100 chart.

=== Live performances ===
In late June 2012, Mill announced his Dreamchasers Tour to promote Dreams and Nightmares, performing at 16 cities across the US. Mill subsequently shared its poster alongside footage of him engaging in activities like performing and driving fast vehicles, accompanied by a list of accolades and the opening caption "Dream chasing is an occupation". Tickets were made available on June 30, 2012, via Ticketmaster and Live Nation. Mill posted "All Access" footage in August, showing him and his team riding around on vehicles such as dirt bikes and all-terrain vehicles. The tour kicked off at the Fillmore Auditorium in Denver, Colorado on August 2, 2012, while it finished 25 days later at Irving Plaza in New York City (NYC). DJ sets by DJ Drama and Casey Veggies were included on the Dreamchasers Tour, as well as cameos from rappers like Yo Gotti, Bow Wow, Ace Hood, Waka Flocka Flame, and T.I.

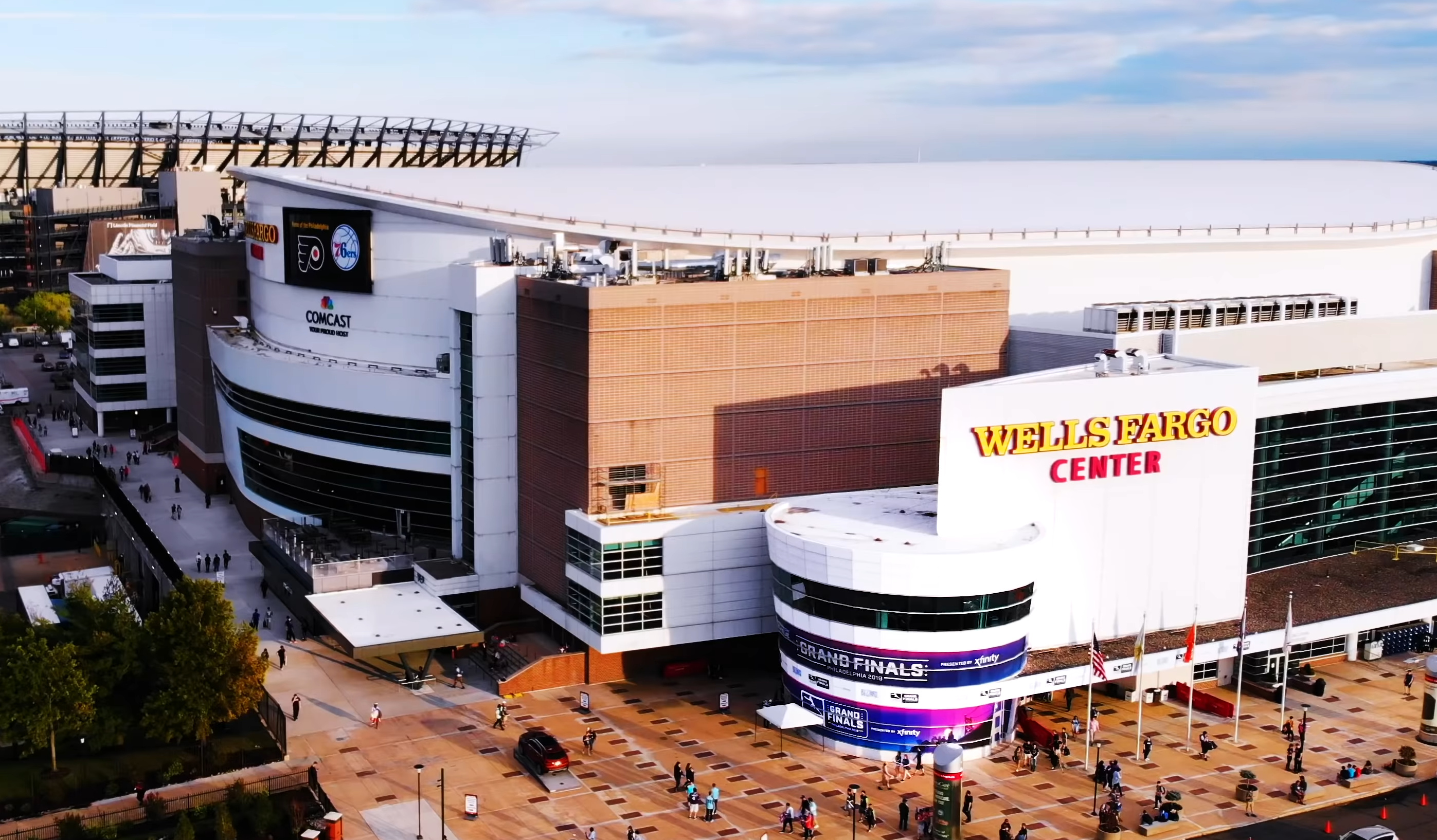
Mill performed the concert "Meek Mill + Friends: Dreams and Nightmares Ten Year Anniversary" at Philadelphia's Wells Fargo Center in November 2022

At the end of October 2022, Mill announced a 10th anniversary concert on Instagram, billed as "Meek Mill + Friends: Dreams and Nightmares Ten Year Anniversary". Mill also revealed a promotional poster and that it was set to take place at the Wells Fargo Center in his hometown of Philadelphia on November 26, coinciding with Thanksgiving in the US. Tickets for the event went on sale via the venue's website at 10 a.m. in early November 2022, although the rapper did not disclose any of the guests initially. The musical direction was handled by Gil Smith II.

Prior to Mill appearing at the Wells Fargo Center, footage played from the early days of his career with the "nappy braids that locked", then his Flamers mixtapes, the release of Dreams and Nightmares, and finally the icon he had widely become. "Friends" in the concert's title was represented by the rappers that joined Mill, including Fabulous, Fivio Foreign, Jim Jones, and A Boogie wit da Hoodie. Mill performed a few tracks from his recently released mixtape Flamers 5, as well as popular album tracks such as "1942 Flows" (2017) and "Respect the Game" (2018). He ended rumours of tensions with Rick Ross by bringing him out to perform "I'm a Boss" (2011), while Mill accompanied the rapper as he performed his own tracks. Mill finished the event by performing "Dreams and Nightmares", telling the crowd he appreciated their support from his time at the bottom and he raps for Philadelphia.

== Critical reception ==
Professional ratings
Aggregate scores
Source	Rating
AnyDecentMusic?	6.0/10
Metacritic	69/100
Review scores
Source	Rating
AllMusic	3.5/5 stars
The A.V. Club	C+
Consequence of Sound	C−
Exclaim!	6/10
HipHopDX	3/5
Pitchfork	7.4/10
PopMatters	6/10
Rolling Stone	3.5/5 stars
Slant Magazine	3/5 stars
XXL	4/5

Dreams and Nightmares was met with generally positive reviews from music critics. At Metacritic, which assigns a normalized rating out of 100 to reviews from mainstream publications, the album received an average score of 69, based on 17 reviews. Aggregator AnyDecentMusic? gave it 6.0 out of 10, based on their assessment of the critical consensus.

AllMusic's Jeffries asserted that the album succeeds in the themes of both dreams and nightmares, finalizing it "is still satisfying and a step forward" for an album release after mixtapes, "slicked up and pimped out in a way that's entirely Maybach". Similarly, Sargent from Pitchfork celebrated the record's transition to the mainstream after Mill's mixtapes for being "distinct in both voice and sound" as it shows his strengths, highlighting his emotion and themes. The staff of XXL declared that "Dreams and Nightmares doesn't break new grounds in hip-hop", serving as a release for Mill to gain respect "on the verge of universal acceptance" like Rick Ross and Wale similarly did.

Marcus J. Moore of BBC Music thought Mill's character of "a decent wordsmith with a gruff disposition" seemed obvious and the album "won't break new ground" in hip hop, feeling somewhat underwhelmed by the compositions and lyrics, yet observing "a respectable effort that ... moves him beyond illicit history". Edwin Ortiz from HipHopDX said the album proves that "Mill needs more time before he can rightfully call himself the lieutenant of the MMG army", concluding it is "a dream that could be forgotten by mid-day". Rytlewski was less enthusiastic in The A.V. Club, seeing the album as another addition to the "already distinguished discography" of Mill's mixtapes and appearances on Maybach compilations. He grudgingly acknowledged the responsibility of following standards for debuts through the likes of "sweeping themes" and reflective lyricism, concluding Mill's execution is competent and the conventional focus only takes him backwards.

=== Accolades ===
Dreams and Nightmares appeared on year-end lists for 2012 of multiple publications. Rap Radar listed the album as the seventh best of the year; Paul "Big Homie" Duong believed that Mill continued the success of his Dreamchasers mixtapes and tells "the prison walls to the hall of fame storyline" to a top level, concluding "this is what dreams are truly made of". The Source named Dreams and Nightmares as the 18th best album of 2012, while journalist Chris Morris picked it as the 10th best hip hop album for North Country Public Radio. The record was named the 15th best hip hop album of the year by Spin. For the 2014 issue of XXL that celebrated 40 years of hip hop, it was listed as one of the five best albums of 2012.

== Commercial performance ==
Dreams and Nightmares debuted at number two on the US Billboard 200, selling 165,000 units and becoming the highest debut of the week. It was held off the top spot by singer Taylor Swift's Red, while the opening sales were only 1,000 apart from Wale's 2011 album Ambition that reached the same position. HipHopDX had predicted that Dreams and Nightmares would reach the top three of the chart, estimating 175,000 to 200,000 first-week sales. It entered the Billboard Top R&B/Hip-Hop Albums chart at number one.

In its second tracking week, the album sold 41,000 copies, reaching 206,000 units in the US. By July 2015, it had amassed 414,000 units. In May 2016, Dreams and Nightmares was awarded a gold certification from the RIAA for reaching 500,000 certified units in the US. Despite not being released as a single, the title track was certified double platinum by the RIAA for amassing 2,000,000 certified units in the country three years later. The album experience lesser success in Canada, peaking at number six on the Canadian Albums Chart. In the United Kingdom, it reached number five on the UK R&B Albums Chart.

== Track listing ==
Credits adapted from the album's liner notes.

Dreams and Nightmares track listing
No.	Title	Writer(s)	Producer(s)	Length
1.	"Dreams and Nightmares"	Robert Williams; Anthony Tucker; Maurice Jordan; Jermaine Preyan	Tone the Beat Bully	3:50
2.	"In God We Trust"	Williams; Byron Forest II; Jordan	Black Metaphor	4:37
3.	"Young & Gettin' It" (featuring Kirko Bangz)	Williams; Orlando Tucker; Kirk Randle; Vincent Robinson	Jahlil Beats	3:26
4.	"Traumatized"	Williams; Matthew Samuels	Boi-1da	4:10
5.	"Believe It" (featuring Rick Ross)	Williams; Roshun Walker; William Roberts II	Young Shun	3:59
6.	"Maybach Curtains" (featuring Rick Ross, Nas and John Legend)	Williams; Marco Rodriguez-Diaz; Mike Molina; Roberts II; Nasir Jones; John Stephens; Alexander Izquierdo	Infamous; The-Agency	4:52
7.	"Amen" (featuring Drake)	Williams; Jeremy Felton; Aubrey Graham; Dwane Weir II; Lester Abrams^{[b]}; Michael McDonald^{[b]}	Key Wane; Jahlil Beats	4:49
8.	"Young Kings"	Williams; Leigh Elliott	Lee Major	3:51
9.	"Lay Up" (featuring Rick Ross, Wale and Trey Songz)	Williams; Daniel Johnson; Ashanti Floyd; David Morgan; Matthew Barrett; Roberts II; Olubowale Akintimehin; Tremaine Neverson	Kane Beatz; The Mad Violinist^{[a]}	4:07
10.	"Tony Story Pt. 2"	Williams; Samuels	Boi-1da	4:23
11.	"Who You're Around" (featuring Mary J. Blige)	Williams; Tommy Brown; Travis Sayles; Mary Blige; Victoria McCants	TBHits; Sayles	3:19
12.	"Polo & Shell Tops"	Williams; Carl McCormick	Cardiak	3:26
13.	"Rich & Famous" (featuring Louie V Gutta)	Williams; Tucker; Robinson; Thomas Butler	Jahlil Beats	4:15
14.	"Real Niggas Come First"	Williams; Jordan; Matthew Furdge	Kenoe; Got Koke	3:32
Total length:				56:36

Deluxe edition bonus tracks
No.	Title	Writer(s)	Producer(s)	Length
15.	"Burn" (featuring Big Sean)	Williams; Tucker; Sean Anderson	Jahlil Beats	3:36
16.	"Freak Show" (featuring 2 Chainz and Sam Sneak)	Williams; Mervin Riviere; Bryan Johnson; Tauheed Epps; Samuel Saint-Jean; Jordan Houston^{[c]}; Paul Beauregard^{[c]}	The Renegades	3:21

Notes

- ^{^[a]} signifies a co-producer

Sample credits

- ^{^[b]} "Amen" contains an interpolation of "Minute by Minute", written by Lester Abrams and Michael McDonald, and performed by The Doobie Brothers
- ^{^[c]} "Freak Show" contains a sample from "Slob on My Knob", written by Jordan Houston and Paul Beauregard, and performed by Tear Da Club Up Thugs

== Personnel ==
Credits adapted from the album's liner notes.

- Jeremih – uncredited vocals (7)
- Finis "KY White" – mixing (1, 2, 7, 14)
- Fabian Marasciullo – mixing (14)
- Chris Athens – mastering (3)
- Justin Smith – mastering (3)

== Charts ==
=== Weekly charts ===
Chart performance for Dreams and Nightmares
Chart (2012)	Peak position
Belgian Albums (Ultratop Flanders)	200
Canadian Albums (Billboard)	6
Danish Albums (Hitlisten)	30
Dutch Albums (Album Top 100)	87
French Albums (SNEP)	199
UK Albums (Official Charts)	67
UK R&B Albums (Official Charts)	5
US Billboard 200	2
US Top R&B/Hip-Hop Albums (Billboard)	1

=== Year-end charts ===
2012 year-end chart performance for Dreams and Nightmares
Chart (2012)	Position
US Billboard 200	138
US Top R&B/Hip-Hop Albums (Billboard)	28

2013 year-end chart performance for Dreams and Nightmares
Chart (2013)	Position
US Billboard 200	193
US Top R&B/Hip-Hop Albums (Billboard)	36

== Certifications ==
Certifications and sales for Dreams and Nightmares
Region	Certification	Certified units/sales
Denmark (IFPI Danmark)	Gold	10,000^{‡}
United States (RIAA)	Gold	414,000
^{‡} Sales+streaming figures based on certification alone.

== See also ==
- 2012 in hip hop music
- Dreamchasers 2
- List of Billboard number-one R&B/Hip-Hop albums of 2012
