= Burn (Meek Mill song) =

2012 single by Meek Mill featuring Big Sean

Single by Meek Mill featuring Big Sean

from the album Dreams and Nightmares (Deluxe) and Dreamchasers 2
- Released: September 11, 2012
- Recorded: 2012
- Genre: Hip-hop; hardcore hip-hop; trap
- Length: 3:36
- Label: 215 Aphillyated; Maybach; Warner Bros.
- Songwriters: Robert Williams; Sean Anderson; Alexander Izquierdo; Orlando Tucker
- Producer: Jahlil Beats

Meek Mill singles chronology
"Triumphant (Get 'Em)" (2012)	"Burn" (2012)	"Young & Gettin' It" (2012)

Big Sean singles chronology
"Clique" (2012)	"Burn" (2012)	"Guap" (2012)

Music video
- "Burn" on YouTube

"Burn" (originally "Gasoline") is a song by American rapper Meek Mill from the deluxe version of his debut studio album, Dreams and Nightmares (2012). The song features a guest appearance from fellow rapper Big Sean. Jahlil Beats handled the production, and co-wrote it with the rappers and Alexander Izquierdo. The producer recorded the song after listening to an early recording, adding more musical elements. It was released for digital download and streaming, as the second single for the album, on September 11, 2012, through Maybach Music Group and Warner Bros. Records. An up-tempo number, the song features brass throughout.

In the lyrics of the song, Mill and Big Sean encourage listeners to burn. "Burn" received positive reviews from music critics, who generally highlighted the rappers' chemistry. Some singled out Big Sean's appearance, while a few critics praised the instrumentation. In the United States, the song topped Billboard's Bubbling Under Hot 100 chart in 2012, alongside peaking at number 86 on the Hot R&B/Hip-Hop Songs chart. It was later certified gold in the country by the Recording Industry Association of America (RIAA). An accompanying music video was released on October 10, 2012, which shows Mill and Big Sean joined by models in a warehouse, along with crocodiles, vehicles, and exploding cars.

== Background and recording ==
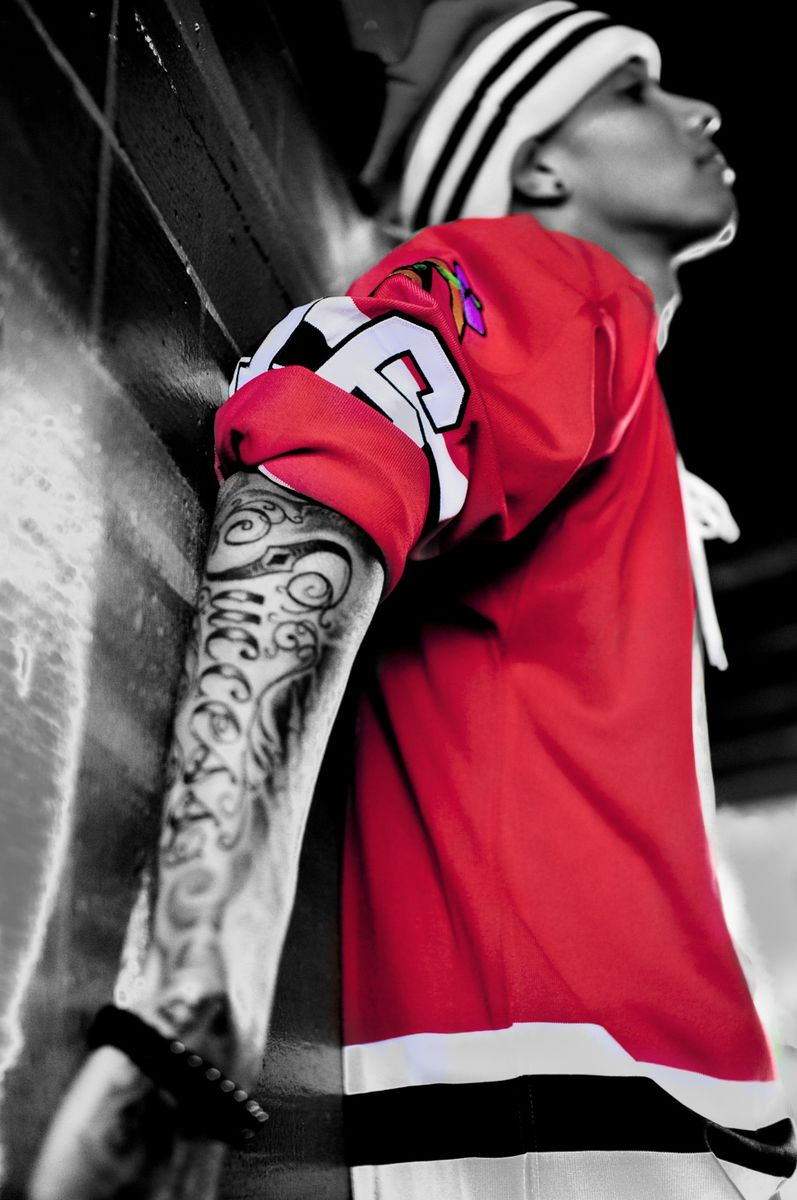
Jahlil Beats served as the song's producer, seeking out a club and radio appeal with the beat.

"Burn" was solely produced by record producer Jahlil Beats, who wrote it alongside Mill, Big Sean, and Alexander Izquierdo. Mill contacted Big Sean to work together on "Burn", following several other collaborations between Maybach and GOOD rappers. He later featured him on his single "B-Boy" alongside fellow rapper ASAP Ferg, which was released in the lead-up to Mill's second studio album Dreams Worth More Than Money (2015). "Burn" leaked online on May 4, 2012, three days before it was released as part of Mill's ninth mixtape Dreamchasers 2. Jahlil Beats produced rapper Bobby Shmurda's single "Hot Nigga" in 2014, crafting it as a continuation of the song and Mill's single "I'm a Boss" (2011).

In January 2012, Mill started working on Dreams and Nightmares and recorded some of the tracks for Dreamchasers 2, including "Burn". Jahlil Beats first formed the song under the title of "Gasoline", deciding to make a part two after listening to the first recording and he added brass. This marked his first collaboration with Big Sean and Mill sent the record to the rapper, with the contributors working together from different areas of the United States. After the brass, Jahlil Beats created the breakdown that includes a snare drum and alarm, intending for the song to have an appeal to clubs and radio stations. The producer finally added a kick, using the 808 drum machine. Mill remembered spending time in the studio with Big Sean for the song and playing him his four bars, going against a typical 16-bar. The rappers then took it in turns to record contributions and became tired out, until they eventually recorded their last parts together in the studio. Mill also revealed that a beat on his 2008 mixtape Flamers is "almost the same" as "Burn", which some people may be unaware of.

== Composition and lyrics ==
Musically, "Burn" is an up-tempo number, which prominently features brass. The song also includes church bells, a light grand piano, and an 808 drum kick. Its breakdown utilizes a snare drum, fire alarm, and whistle. During their performance of the song, Mill and Big Sean go back and forth.

In the lyrics of "Burn", the rappers implore listeners to "let that shit burn!" Big Sean delivers simple, comedic lines, while Mill conveys grit and aggression. Such lyrics from the former include: "I'm on a yacht gettin' hella high/ Smoking good/That seaweed." He also boasts about having a woman "in her cha-cha" as he grabs "on her chi-chi's".

== Release and reception ==
The song was released for digital download and streaming formats in the US, as the second single for the album, by Maybach and Warner Bros. on September 11, 2012. On October 30, 2012, "Burn" was included as the 15th and penultimate track on the deluxe version of Mill's debut studio album Dreams and Nightmares. The song was well-received by music critics, with general praise for Mill and Big Sean's chemistry. Complex named the song the fifth best of 2012, with Insanul Ahmed promising that if you exercise on a treadmill while listening to it and "let that shit burn", you will quickly be in top shape. He said the instrumental's "ferocious energy" is matched by Mill and Big Sean, whose differences make them a powerful duo. Ahmed elaborated that Mill is known for "humor and flash without much muscle" and Big Sean for "grit and aggression" with a lack of wit; he concluded that their styles compliment each other. The magazine also listed Big Sean's feature as the third best guest verse of 2012; Ernest Baker and Andrew Martin wrote that it features the mixtape's best rapping with "Sean's witty rhymes", and concluded of his yacht lyrics: "Anchors aweigh!" AllHipHop's K1ng Eljay picked the song as the best track on Dreamchasers 2, assuring that Big Sean outperforms Mill and brings it "to anthem-level heights". Jordan Sargent from Pitchfork thought "Burn" may be the best track, noting Big Sean's appearance as a standout and praising Mill for this collaboration. Chris Yuscavage of Vibe stated it deserved to be first released on Dreams and Nightmares; he highlighted the blend of Mill's vocals and Jahlil Beats' "frantic, uptempo beats", and noted Big Sean "also keeps up well" as the rappers exchange lines that should create "some burn this summer". Writing for HotNewHipHop, Jon Godfrey declared that the song provides Mill's fans "a return to his relentless flow". Sargent identified the song as one of the "up-tempo bangers" that Mill had "made his name" on, believing it could have replaced one of the earlier songs on the album.

Upon release as a single, "Burn" topped the US Bubbling Under Hot 100 Singles chart, published by Billboard. The song earlier entered the US Hot R&B/Hip-Hop Songs chart at number 86 for the issue dated August 4, 2012, only appearing for a week. On May 6, 2019, "Burn" was awarded a gold certification by the Recording Industry Association of America (RIAA) for pushing 500,000 certified units in the US.

== Music video and other usage ==
On September 22, 2012, Mill and Big Sean filmed the music video for "Burn" at a warehouse in Miami. During Big Sean's close-up shoot with a crocodile, Mill implored, "You damn near tripped over that bitch wen u walked by...good luck!!" The music video premiered on October 10, 2012, and was directed by Dre Films. It begins by showing Mill in a warehouse, with crocodiles and a ring of rising flames surrounding him. One of the animals is next to a bottle of Patrón and the scene shortly changes to a parking lot in the warehouse, where Big Sean and female models join Mill. Motorcycles and exploding cars appear alongside the rappers, and at points, the models wear gas masks. Mill shows off his jewellery next to a crocodile and for the conclusion, he moves forward with Big Sean as a car explodes.

On July 20, 2012, rapper Diggy Simmons released a freestyle over the instrumental of "Burn". In the freestyle, he mentions the original artists and calls out criticism of his first-week sales, alongside addressing how he sorted his problems with fellow rapper J. Cole.

== Charts ==
Chart performance for "Burn"
Chart (2012)	Peak position
US Bubbling Under Hot 100 (Billboard)	1
US Hot R&B/Hip-Hop Songs (Billboard)	86

== Certifications ==
Certifications for "Burn"
Region	Certification	Certified units/sales
United States (RIAA)	Gold	500,000^{‡}
^{‡} Sales+streaming figures based on certification alone.
