= Dreams and Nightmares (song) =

2012 song by Meek Mill

Song by Meek Mill

from the album Dreams and Nightmares
- Released: October 30, 2012
- Recorded: September 2012
- Studio: Ocean Sky Hotel (Miami)
- Genre: Hip hop
- Length: 3:26
- Label: Maybach; Warner Bros.
- Songwriters: Robert Williams; Anthony Tucker; Maurice Jordan; Jermaine Preyan
- Producer: Tone the Beat Bully

Music video
- "Dreams and Nightmares (Intro)" on YouTube

"Dreams and Nightmares" is a song by American rapper Meek Mill, released as the opening track of his debut studio album of the same name (2012). The song's production was handled by Tone the Beat Bully, who served as a co-writer with Mill, Maurice Jordan, and Mack Maine. It was recorded at the Ocean Sky Hotel in Miami during the late sessions for the album in September 2012. After rapping his first part, Mill requested a beat switch and finished writing the second verse once it was added. A hip hop number with maximalist and grime elements, the resulting song contains piano in the two parts and moves between them with the beat switch.

Mill raps his verses uninterrupted, moving from a light tone in the dreams part to a loud delivery for the nightmares side. In the lyrics of the song, he juxtaposes his eventual success with his rise from the bottom in Philadelphia. "Dreams and Nightmares" received universal acclaim from music critics, who lauded the strength of Mill's rapping. Some highlighted his storytelling, while a few critics complimented the switch between the two parts. In 2019, Pitchfork listed the song as the 92nd best of the 2010s.

In the United States, the song reached the top spot of the Billboard Bubbling Under R&B/Hip-Hop Singles chart and was certified double platinum by the Recording Industry Association of America. It was also awarded a silver certification in the United Kingdom by the British Phonographic Industry. An accompanying music video premiered on MTV2 in January 2013, reflecting on Mill's career journey up to this point. Accomplishments are shown for the dreams side, while chaos is started by him to represent nightmares. Mill performed "Dreams and Nightmares" live at the Summer Jam festivals of 2013, 2018, and 2022. In June 2015, Gonzalo "Papi" Le Batard delivered an a cappella cover for ESPN's daily sports talk television program, Highly Questionable. The song has become known as Mill's most important release, notably for the impact and significance in hip hop. It was played as the Philadelphia Eagles' intro music for the Super Bowl LII in 2018.

== Background and recording ==
"Dreams and Nightmares" was solely produced by record producer Tone the Beat Bully, who co-wrote it with Mill, Maurice Jordan, and Mack Maine. The producer played an early version for host Quincy Harris of Philadelphia stations WTXF-TV and WRNB in 2011. He was impressed by the song having "that magnitude coming from a new-school Philly artist", seeing it as Mill progressing in the rap game after having known him for around five years. Philadelphia DJ Cosmic Kev revealed that it was one of the three songs Mill sent him before the release of Dreams and Nightmares, though the rapper was unsure about the song. The DJ quickly took a liking, listening to the piano as Mill told him to wait and feeling certain after the next part that it would be "a Philadelphia anthem". Mill told XXL editor Shaheem Reid that the song shows both sides of how he can be a dream and a nightmare, explaining the former is "a little softer" than "a massacre" from the latter.

After the release of the Dreams and Nightmares single "Young & Gettin' It", Mill recorded the title track at Miami's Ocean Sky Hotel during one of the album's last sessions in September 2012. Mill delivered multiple takes in the studio, which he enthusiastically asked the rappers with him to play back from the start. They reacted positively and Mill also rapped along at points, concluding after the takes: "Can't do nothing but talk strongly." Mill told the rappers that the first part of "Dreams and Nightmares" represented dreams, while the second was based on nightmares. Atlantic Records senior vice president of A&R Dallas Martin recalled that Tone the Beat Bully's music was the same throughout when he first played the song, with Mill rapping the first part over piano in the studio. Afterwards, Mill wanted the producer to add a beat switch as he rapped that "y'all thought I was finished", an idea the studio team were fond of. Tone the Beat Bully then changed the music unannounced and Mill wrote most of his verse to see the reaction of the team, who were impressed with his rapping on the second part. Martin offered that the first part shows Mill's rapping abilities, while the second part is his renowned confidence.

== Composition and lyrics ==
Musically, "Dreams and Nightmares" is a hip hop number, with elements of maximalist and grime music. The first part representing dreams features somber grand piano keys and strings, which were described as angelic. In the middle of the song, the beat suddenly switches to a dark production, marked by the "M-M-M-M-Maybach Music" tag from a woman named Jessica Gomez. The second part which represents nightmares then relies on a repeated coda structure with minor chords, including piano stabs and synthesizers.

Mill continuously raps verses for around 200 seconds on "Dreams and Nightmares", without any hooks; the total length is 3 minutes and 26 seconds (3:26). For the dreams part, he delivers a 24-bar verse with a light tone that includes spoken word. Mill's voice gradually gets louder, until his tone drastically changes after the beat switch for the nightmares side. He raps in a hoarse voice with a loud delivery, performing rhythmic riffs in different flows and conveying hurt.

For the song's dreams part, Mill chronicles his ascent from the bottom in his early Philadelphia days to the top, recognizing his opportunities and the blessing of a debut album. Mill opens with a victory celebration that he "used to pray for times like this, to rhyme like this" and "had to grind like that, to shine like this", telling the story of reaching the top. He also boasts of his newfound achievements, including having a Rolls-Royce Phantom too large to park, a "shorty tried to [sic] bless me like I said 'achoo'", and a collaboration with singer Mariah Carey. To begin the nightmares part, where he presents himself as a hater's nightmare, Mill teases: "Hold up, wait a minute/ Y'all thought I was finished?" He conveys arrogance and juxtaposes his unexpected success from Philadelphia's Berk Street with the dreams side, having defied the odds. Mill denounces his doubters and sees how he had not been given any chance, addressing subjects like his work ethic, homicides, and demons from the past.

== Release and promotion ==
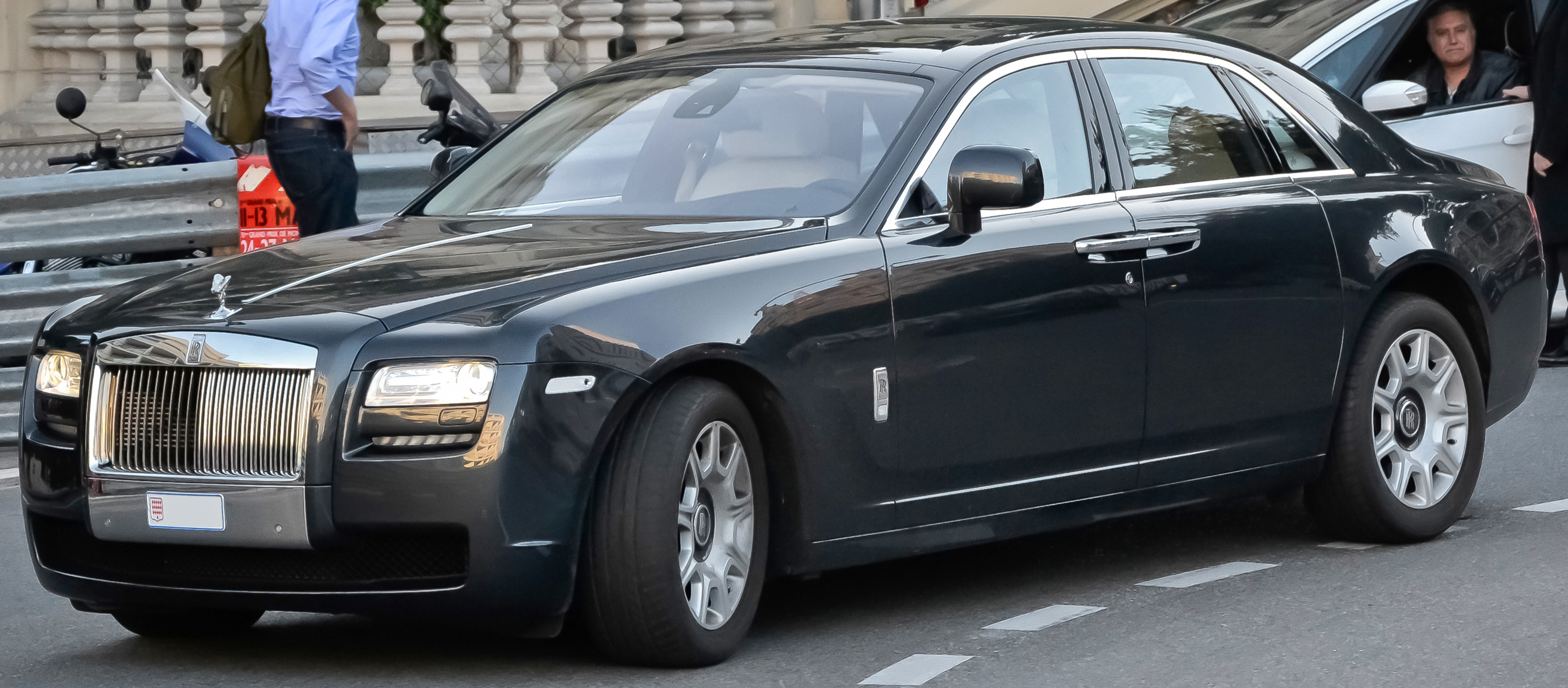
Expensive cars are shown throughout the song's music video, including a Rolls-Royce Ghost (pictured).

On October 30, 2012, "Dreams and Nightmares" was released as the opening track on Mill's debut studio album of the same name, issued by Maybach and Warner Bros. He had previously previewed the song for the album's listening session at Electric Lady Studios in New York City on October 10, emphasizing the change in the middle at the session. A music video for "Dreams and Nightmares" premiered via MTV2 on January 27, 2013, directed by Alex Nazari. It looks back on Mill's career journey up to that point, beginning with him in the back of a cold police van. The dreams side comes first with snapshots of Mill's accomplishments, like appearing in Carey's video for "Triumphant (Get 'Em)" (2012). Footage also shows Mill in the streets, him rapping in his early days, and expensive cars. The video changes around the middle, transitioning to the nightmares side. Mill shows off his Aston Martin and Rolls-Royce Ghost cars, while he creates chaos with his team as they start fires and ride around on motorbikes.

== Reception ==
"Dreams and Nightmares" was met with universal acclaim from music critics, with common praise for Mill's strength as a rapper. Writing for Pitchfork, Jordan Sagent stated that Mill goes from his early days in Philadelphia to strip clubs in Miami on the song, accompanied by a beat "that morphs into menace halfway through". He declared that it "best distills Meek's singularity"; hurt is felt through his voice and lyrics, symbolizing rap's literal and spiritual roots. In a similar review at BBC Music, Marcus J. Moore wrote that the song offers "an intricate depiction" of Mill by choosing to reflect on his past for explaining who he has become and eases into a celebration. Moore thought that he switches up in the middle and goes off on "everything from his work ethic to committing homicides", with a strident voice "over threatening piano stabs and haunting synthesizers". Jesse Cataldo from Slant Magazine was interested in the song's take on "the festive-stage setting", progressing from "a convivial celebration of new success to a scary minor-chord flashback" as Mill becomes serious and threatening. He continued that Mill is "too hounded by old ghosts" and thought the quick transition "from bubbly self-commemoration to lacerating malice" makes his differences from his mentor and fellow rapper Rick Ross clear, as he is realistic and raw. For HipHopDX, Edwin Ortiz detailed how the song has all the elements of an album's classic opening: "cinematic piano strokes, beautifully-guided strings and motivating words", abruptly transitioning "into a menacing illustration of spiteful arrogance and threats" that is powered by Mill's loud delivery, providing an indisputable performance that creates high expectations.

The staff of XXL believed Mill rightfully celebrates his much-anticipated victory and "skillfully balanc[es] the two worlds" of dreams and nightmares, nearly sounding possessed in the song's second part. MTV's Nadeska Alexis assured that the song is a standout on Dreams and Nightmares, creating the tone with "a powerful tale about the grind and struggle to the top" through impactful lines. Rolling Stone critic Jody Rosen said that for listeners familiar with Mill from his 2010s Dreamchasers mixtapes and appearances on Maybach compilations, the character of "a braggart with a chip on his shoulder and a knack for stacking up nifty interior rhymes" is recognizable. Matthew Fiander of PopMatters lauded how Mill's shouting builds up on "the on-fire opener" and he delivers long verses with "line after blistering line" that instantly affirm he is utilizing his top ability, separating himself from any weak rapping with real skill. Exclaim!'s Chayne Japal asserted that the "mission statement-charged" song proves why Mill "raps with such an impassioned sense of urgency". In a lukewarm review for Prefix Mag, Charlie Kaplan believed that the song tries "at the album's conceit" as an opener and begins awkwardly and unstably, until Mill's "tone changes drastically" in the second part to recognizable in voice and rhythm, albeit repetitive.

=== Accolades ===
In 2015, Stereogum ranked "Dreams and Nightmares" as Mill's best song, with David Turner feeling that he expresses so much "that it can overshadow all his other work", covering his opportunities and lack of chances. Pitchfork named it as the 92nd best song of the 2010s on their 2019 list; Sagent highlighted the beat switch as "the gas pedal" and noted the influence over following rap songs. In 2020, XXL listed the song as Mill's greatest ever. A year later, Complex ranked it as the best intro to any of his projects, commenting that "Philly grit [is] distilled into pure adrenaline" and the motivational spirit unites any listeners.

=== Commercial performance ===
Commercially, "Dreams and Nightmares" experienced a minor reception. Upon the release of the album, the title track reached number one on the US Billboard Bubbling Under R&B/Hip-Hop Singles chart. On December 9, 2019, "Dreams and Nightmares" was awarded a double platinum certification by the Recording Industry Association of America for amassing 2,000,000 certified units in the United States. The song was certified silver by the British Phonographic Industry for pushing 200,000 units in the United Kingdom on February 2, 2024.

== Live performances ==
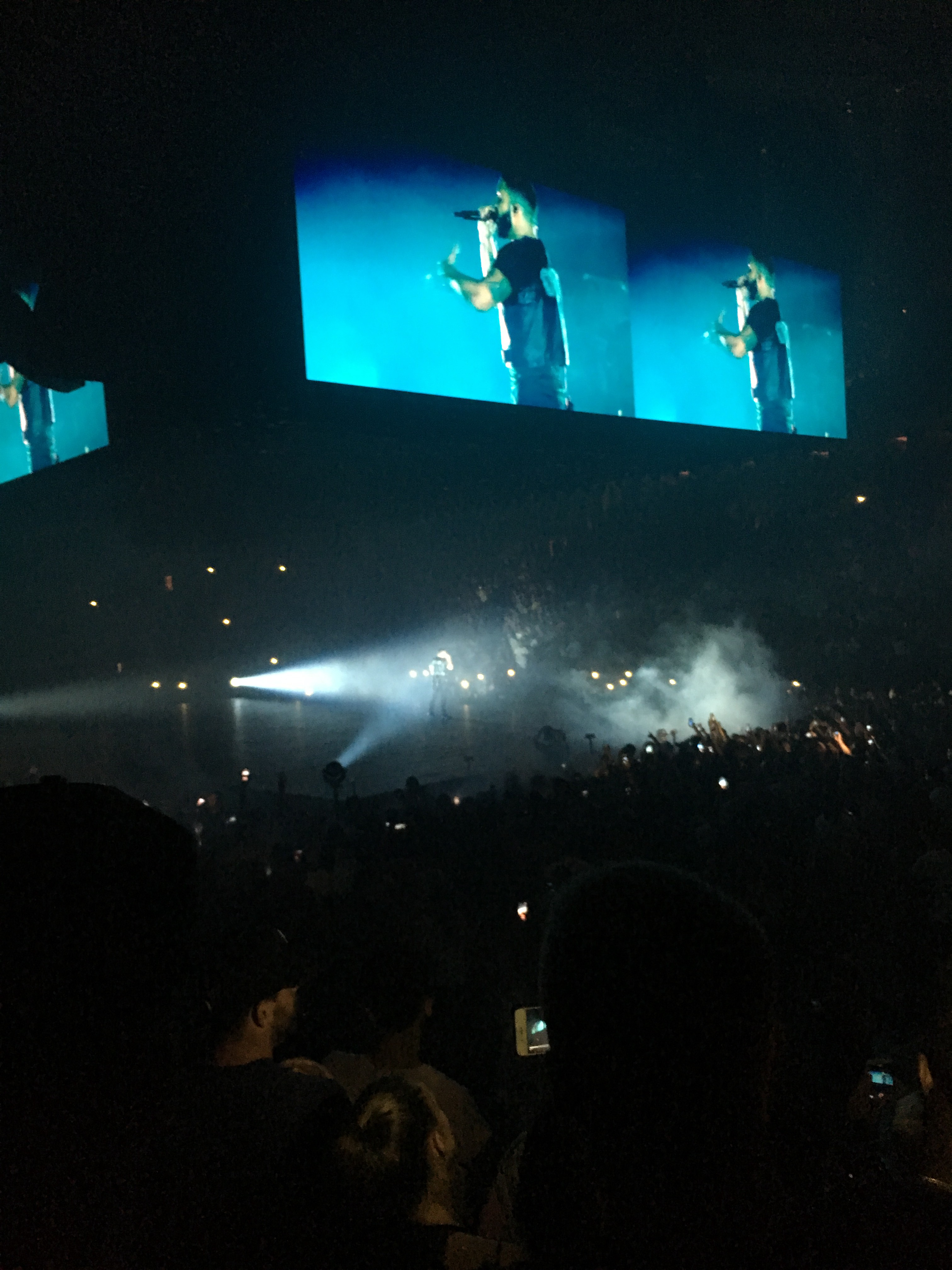
Mill performed the song a couple of times with Drake in 2018, ending their three-year feud with the first one at TD Garden on the Aubrey & the Three Migos Tour.

Since 2012, Mill has frequently performed "Dreams and Nightmares" as an outro to live sets. At the 2013 Summer Jam, fellow rapper Wale brought out Mill, who performed the song. Mill also performed it at that year's BET Hip Hop Awards. On August 6, 2015, Mill delivered a performance of the song at the Susquehanna Bank Center in Camden, New Jersey. He performed it at Drai's Beach Club & Nightclub in Las Vegas on August 25, 2017, with his former rival and fellow rapper 50 Cent appearing as a hype man. On September 3, Mill appeared for rapper Jay-Z to perform the song during his intermission at the closing set of the Made in America Festival in Philadelphia, serving the same role. Mill performed the song for the 2018 Summer Jam at the Metlife Stadium in East Rutherford, New Jersey, with a video intro of him and his team riding bikes there that referenced his 2017 arrest, after his recent prison release. He drove in on a 4-wheeler for a wheelie, before exciting the crowd with his performance and saying, "Nothing is impossible. If you come from the bottom, chase your dreams..."

Mill emerged from the stage of Canadian musician Drake's concert at TD Garden arena in Boston for his Aubrey & the Three Migos Tour on September 8, 2018, performing the song and ending their three-year feud. Drake called for peace and said Mill is a brother, while Canadian politician Norm Kelly ended his ban on the rapper entering Toronto that the feud caused in 2015. On September 15, 2018, Mill performed the song for Drake's concert in Philadelphia and he served as the rapper's hype man. Drake called him the "king of Philly", giving the city "its own special show" and the two embraced on stage. Mill performed a medley of hits to open the 2019 NBA All-Star Game at the Spectrum Center in Charlotte, North Carolina, including "Dreams and Nightmares" for player LeBron James' team. He wore a large yellow jacket for the performance, backed by six dancers, a DJ, and pyrotechnics. In the middle of his set at the 2021 Global Citizen Festival at Central Park in Manhattan, Mill performed the song and rallied the crowd to raise their phones. On October 6, 2021, Mill appeared for fellow rapper Lil Baby's concert at Prudential Center in Newark, New Jersey on his Back Outside Tour, performing it as the audience sang along.

Mill performed the song at the 2022 Summer Jam in Metlife Stadium. On October 16, 2022, the rapper delivered a sideline performance of it for game six of the 2022 NFL season between football teams the Philadelphia Eagles and the Dallas Cowboys at Philadelphia's Lincoln Financial Field. Mill performed the song before Game 5 of the 2022 World Series between the Philadelphia Phillies and the Houston Astros at Citizens Bank Park in the city, driving away with the Phillie Phanatic on an all-terrain vehicle afterwards. He performed it at the album's 10th anniversary concert "Meek Mill + Friends: Dreams and Nightmares Ten Year Anniversary", held at the Wells Fargo Center in Philadelphia on November 26, 2022. Mill showed appreciation for his supporters after coming from the bottom and implored that he raps for the city, while the fans sang along and balloons fell across the stadium.

== Appearances in media ==
On August 21, 2014, Drake and American rapper Lil Wayne performed "Dreams and Nightmares" in Philadelphia on their Drake vs. Lil Wayne tour, dedicating it to Mill's jail sentence. Fellow rapper Big Sean delivered a freestyle medley over various beats for Cosmic Kev's Come Up Show at Power 99 FM, including the song, on October 14. In the freestyle, he shouted out Mill and Philadelphia. Lil Wayne rapped over the beat on his mixtape Sorry 4 the Wait 2, released on January 20, 2015.

In June 2015, TV personality Gonzalo "Papi" Le Batard delivered an a capella cover of the song on ESPN's program Highly Questionable, which Mill posted to his Instagram. Rapper King Los freestyled over the song's beat for G.O.A.T. Tape in December 2017, a mixtape featuring popular instrumentals. Cardi B interpolated the song on "Get Up 10", released on the rapper's debut album Invasion of Privacy (2018). Fellow rapper Westside Boogie freestyled over the instrumental of "Dreams and Nightmares" for the Los Angeles Lakers' 68th freestyle episode on January 24, 2019.

== Legacy ==
In the years since its release, "Dreams and Nightmares" has been regarded as Mill's most important song. In 2013, Mill said of the song's impact on Juan Epstein's Hot 97 podcast that he "didn't think [people] would respond to that song like that" and acknowledged this is why he "made that song in that manner", not considering "they was gon' catch it the way they caught it". On April 30, 2014, Drake affirmed on Twitter that the song is one of the best rap moments of his generation. In an interview for Complex the following month, Mill appreciated Drake's comment, and confirmed that he and his team always thought it about the song. On November 13, 2017, a crowd of protestors loudly chanted the song outside the Criminal Justice Center in Philadelphia to rally against Mill's jail sentence.

After special teams coordinator Dave Fipp played the song to the Philadelphia Eagles in a January 2018 meeting, they adopted it as their warm-up anthem for Super Bowl LII. Once the team played to the song when they defeated the Minnesota Vikings for the NFC Championship on January 21, 2018, its average daily streams across the US increased by almost 1.5 times, according to Amazon Music. The streams surged in Philadelphia, reaching 2.5 times more than before the win. Player Rodney McLeod subsequently said that with Mill being from Philadelphia, his music is "motivation for us" and assured those from the city definitely like the rapper.

"Dreams and Nightmares" was used by the Philadelphia Eagles as their pre-game intro music for Super Bowl LII at the U.S. Bank Stadium in Minneapolis on February 4, 2018. Mill issued a statement on the usage from prison to Bleacher Report and NBC Sports Philadelphia, expressing that his spirit was truly lifted hearing the team "rally around my songs because that's why I make music—to inspire others and bring people together". Nielsen Music reported that the song received 1.47 million US on-demand audio and video streams a day after the event, increasing by 71 percent compared to the 854,000 on the day. The Cleveland Cavaliers, which includes LeBron James, rapped along to the song to celebrate their victory over the Boston Celtics in the 2018 NBA playoffs.

Speaking to Billboard in 2018, Cosmic Kev was confident that the impact of "Dreams and Nightmares" will last on the city and hip hop, saying the song "could be 30 years old and it will still be an anthem; it's timeless". He was surprised by the song's attention outside of Philadelphia, explaining that it has become "an anthem [across] so many different areas: it's a sports anthem, and it's an anthem for encouragement". Cosmic Kev mentioned that the song cannot be placed into an anthem category since "it's about the underdog, on the come up, taking over". Rapper Joe Budden crowned the track the best rap intro of all time at his eponymous podcast on June 30, 2022, affirming: "I don't think it's blasphemous to say. It can be said. It's safe to say." Rapper Armani Caesar tweeted that the song is "like the black national anthem" and makes listeners "damn near put they hand [sic]" over they heart [sic]" on August 4. On September 6, 2022, Mill committed to performing the song for free at any weddings in October to celebrate its 10th anniversary, which quickly led to many requests from fans. The Philadelphia Eagles used the song as their anthem another time in the lead-up to the Super Bowl LVII in 2023.

== Credits and personnel ==
Information taken from Dreams and Nightmares liner notes.

- Meek Mill – songwriter
- Tone the Beat Bully – songwriter, producer
- Maurice Jordan – songwriter
- Jermaine Preyan – songwriter
- Finis "KY" White – mixer

== Charts ==
Chart performance for "Dreams and Nightmares"
Chart (2012)	Peak position
US Bubbling Under R&B/Hip-Hop Singles (Billboard)	1

== Certifications ==
Certifications for "Dreams and Nightmares"
Region	Certification	Certified units/sales
New Zealand (RMNZ)	Gold	15,000^{‡}
United Kingdom (BPI)	Silver	200,000^{‡}
United States (RIAA)	2× Platinum	2,000,000^{‡}
^{‡} Sales+streaming figures based on certification alone.
