= House Party (Meek Mill song) =

Single by Meek Mill featuring Young Chris
- Released: October 29, 2011
- Recorded: 2011
- Genre: Hip hop
- Length: 4:21
- Label: Maybach Music Group, Warner Bros.
- Songwriters: Robert Williams, Christopher F. Ries
- Producer: The Beat Bully

"House Party" is a song by American recording artist Meek Mill, released as the first single from his mixtape Dreamchasers, the first mixtape he released since signing to Maybach Music Group, and is the first installment of his Dreamchasers series. It features fellow Philadelphia rapper and State Property member Young Chris. It was also produced by The Beat Bully.

== Music video ==
On December 11, 2011, the music video, directed by Dre Films, was released on MTV2. Cameo appearances are made by Rick Ross, French Montana, DJ Drama, Lil Duval and Twista.

== Remix ==
The official remix was included as the seventeenth track on Meek Mill's later mixtape, Dreamchasers 2, the second installment in his Dreamchasers series. It features rappers Fabolous, Wale and Mac Miller.

== Track listing ==
Digital single

No.	Title	Writer(s)	Producer(s)	Length
1.	"House Party" (featuring Young Chris)	Robert Williams, Christopher F. Ries	The Beat Bully	4:21

== Charts ==
Chart (2011)	Peak position
US Hot R&B/Hip-Hop Songs (Billboard)	45
US Rap Songs (Billboard)	24

== Certifications ==
Region	Certification	Certified units/sales
United States (RIAA)	Gold	500,000^{‡}
^{‡} Sales+streaming figures based on certification alone.
