= Jahlil Beats =

American record producer (born 1988)

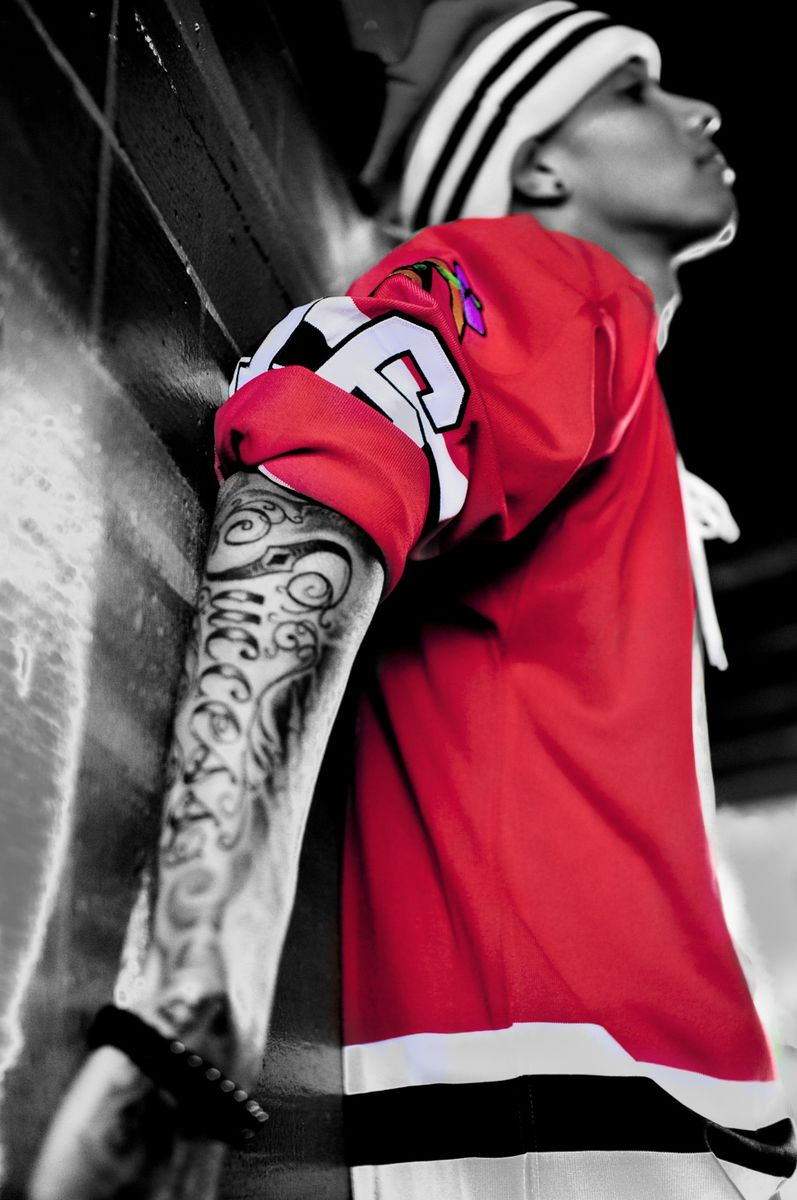
- Jahlil Beats in 2013

Background information
- Born: Orlando Jahlil Tucker; February 8, 1988 (age 38); Chester, Pennsylvania, U.S.
- Genres: Hip hop
- Occupations: Record producer; songwriter
- Years active: 2008–present
- Label: Roc Nation

Orlando Jahlil Tucker (born February 8, 1988), better known by his stage name Jahlil Beats, is an American hip hop record producer. He has produced for artists such as Lil Wayne, Fabolous, Meek Mill, Chris Brown, Tyga, Rick Ross, Ace Hood, Bobby Shmurda, T.I., and 50 Cent, among others.

He is best known for producing Meek Mill's "Ima Boss" and "Burn", and Lloyd Banks' "Jackpot", which was more famously used by Bobby Shmurda's "Hot Nigga".

== Early life ==
Orlando Jahlil Tucker was born in Chester, Pennsylvania. At the age of 12, he started learning audio engineering concepts, and building a passion for music under the guidance of his father (who was in a band) and cousin. By age 15, he taught his brother, Anthony (The Beat Bully) how to produce music and they began making beats together. In high school, they gave their beats to friends for them to rap over. Tucker then attended college, but due to him losing his financial aid, he dropped out.

== Musical career ==
After dropping out of college in 2008, Jahlil Beats returned to his city where he would meet upcoming rapper Meek Mill. Shortly after meeting, they collaborated with each other frequently. It is at that point, that Jahlil says was when he started taking music seriously. He first became notable after producing several tracks with Haydock Beats for Tyga and Chris Brown's collaboration mixtape Fan of a Fan, including "Holla at Me". He then would get what he considers his first big beat placement, which would be "Tonight" off Fabolous' EP There Is No Competition 2: The Grieving Music EP.

In 2011, Jahlil Beats produced Meek Mill's breakout hit "Ima Boss". His production for that song, would later be named the tenth-best instrumental between 2008 and 2013 by Complex. Later that year following a six-label bidding war, on October 16 he signed a publishing deal with Jay-Z's Roc Nation, who also manages Meek Mill. In the following months he collaborated on songs artists such as Jay-Z, 50 Cent, Rihanna, J. Cole, Busta Rhymes, Meek Mill, Nelly, Big Sean, T.I., Jim Jones, Bow Wow, Willow Smith, and French Montana for their respective forthcoming albums. He would also start to closely work under No ID after signing to Roc Nation. He was even one of the first people to confirm working on Jay-Z's twelfth studio album. On July 20, 2012, he released a six-track free EP titled Legend Music.

On November 6, 2012, he released an instrumental mixtape titled Legends Era. On December 25, 2012, he released an instrumental mixtape titled Crack Music 6. He followed that with Legends Era II on April 16, 2013. The second installment of Legends Era featured vocal guest appearances by Busta Rhymes, French Montana, Young Jeezy, Kid Ink, Juelz Santana, Lil Wayne, Game, Big Sean, Problem, Styles P, Vado, Ace Hood, and Meek Mill among others. On August 1 he was scheduled to release his second instrumental mixtape of the year Genius, however its release would be pushed back until September 10, 2013. It was met with positive reviews by music critics. On December 25, 2013, Jahlil Beats released the previously announced Legends Era III. The mixtape contained guest appearances by Lil Wayne, Wiz Khalifa, ASAP Rocky, Future, Tyga, Juicy J, The Game, French Montana, Kid Ink, Kirko Bangz, Meek Mill, The LOX, Ab-Soul, Joey Badass, Action Bronson, Problem, Logic, Gunplay, Dizzy Wright, Vado, Ace Hood, Yo Gotti, Smoke DZA, Trae tha Truth, Project Pat, Trina, Rockie Fresh, and Jae Millz among others. On October 31, 2014, he released a mixtape titled Crack Music 7.

== Production style ==
Although he used samples early in his career, Beats has stated that he is moving away from using samples in his music: "I ain't trying to share my publishing. If you sample they might take 80%, leave you with 20. They getting paid off a record they did 20 years ago. So I like to do a lot of my stuff from scratch because I want all my publishing. I'm stingy with mine." In most of his songs, there can be siren heard throughout the beat. His songs also contain a production tag of his then three-year-old niece saying "Jahlil Beats Holla At Me".

== Discography ==
Extended plays

- Legend Music (2012)
- The Blessing (2015)

Mixtapes

- Crack Music 1 (2008)
- On My Grind (2009)
- Crack Music 2 (2009)
- Crack Music 3 (2010)
- Still On My Grind (2011)
- Crack Music 4 (2011)
- Crack Music 5 (2011)
- Legend Season (2012)
- Legend Era (2012)
- Crack Music 6 (2012)
- Legend Era II (2013)
- Genius (2013)
- Legend Era III (2013)
- 808 God (2014)
- Crack Music 7 (2014)
- God's Plan (2015) (with CRMC)
- New Levels, New Devils (2016) (with CRMC)
- Fr33 Spirits (2017)

== Production discography ==
=== Singles produced ===
Year	Title	Chart positions				Certifications	Album
Year	Title	US	US R&B/HH	US Rap	CAN	Certifications	Album
2009	"Make 'Em Say" (Meek Mill)	—	94	—	—		Flamerz 2.5: The Preview
2010	"Rosé Red" (Meek Mill)	—	103	—	—		Flamerz 3: The Wait Is Over
2010	"Money Money Money" (Red Cafe featuring Diddy and Fabolous)	—	68	—	—		Non-album single
2011	"Ima Boss" (Meek Mill featuring Rick Ross)	51	20	17	—		Dreamchasers
2011	"Ima Boss" (Remix) (featuring DJ Khaled, T.I., Rick Ross, Lil Wayne, Birdman and Swizz Beatz)	51	—	—	—		Non-album singles
2011	"Let It Go (Dope Boy)" (Red Cafe featuring Diddy)	—	76	—	—		Non-album singles
2012	"Let It Go (Dope Boy)" (Remix) (Red Café featuring Diddy, French Montana and 2 Chainz)	—	—	—	—		Hell's Kitchen
2012	"Amen" (Meek Mill featuring Drake)	57	5	4	—	RIAA: Gold	Dreams and Nightmares
2012	"Burn" (Meek Mill feat. Big Sean)	101	86	—	—		Dreams and Nightmares
2012	"Young & Gettin' It" (Meek Mill feat. Kirko Bangz)	86	25	18	—		Dreams and Nightmares
2012	"B.L.A.B. (Ballin' Like a Bitch)" (Ace Hood)	—	85	—	—		Body Bag Vol. 2
2012	"Trouble" (Leona Lewis featuring Childish Gambino)	—	—	—	7		Glassheart
2014	"Hot Nigga" (Bobby Shmurda)	6	1	1	34	RIAA: 5× Platinum	Shmurda She Wrote EP
2015	"Monster" (Meek Mill)	96	30	19	—		Non-album single
2018	"Bubblin" (Anderson .Paak)	-	-	-		RIAA: Gold	Non-album single
"—" denotes a recording that did not chart.

=== Other produced ===
==== 2010 ====
Fabolous – There Is No Competition 2: The Grieving Music EP

- 08. "Tonight" (featuring Red Café)

Meek Mill – Flamerz 3: The Wait Is Over

- 04. "I'm Tryna" (featuring Mel Luv & E. Ness)
- 10. "40 On My Hip" (featuring NH & Nitty)
- 11. "I'm Clean" (featuring Young Dro)
- 12. "Make Em Say"
- 13. "Money Like A Mufucka" (featuring K. Smith & Mel Luv)
- 16. "I Want Em All (featuring Mel Luv)
- 23. "I'm Killin' Em" (featuring Red Café)

Chris Brown & Tyga – Fan Of A Fan

- 06. "48 Bar Rap"
- 19. "G Shit"
- 20. "Holla At Me"

Meek Mill – Mr. Philadelphia

- 02. "Indian Bounce"
- 03. "Rose Red" (remix) (featuring T.I., Vado, & Rick Ross)
- 06. "Legggo" (featuring Peedi Crakk, & Young Chris)
- 14. "Ballin'" (featuring Shizz & Nitty)
- 18. "Where Dey Do Dat" (featuring Young Chris)
- 23. "Bullet Wit Ya Name" (featuring Manny Wellz)

Gucci Mane – Ferrari Music

- 09. "Deuces" (remix) (featuring Chris Brown and Tyga) (with Kevin McCall)

==== 2011 ====
Cory Gunz – Son Of A Gun

- 20. "I'm Fuckin' Wit It" (featuring Young Hash)

Meek Mill – Dreamchasers

- 08. "Tony Story" (featuring Jahlil Beats)

==== 2012 ====
Jadakiss – Consignment

- 03. "Paper Tags" (featuring Wale, French Montana, and Styles P)

Meek Mill – Dreamchasers 2

- 07. "Flexing"

Roscoe Dash – 2.0

- 04. "Zodiak Sign" (featuring Lloyd)

Ace Hood – Body Bag Vol. 2

- 02. "Wanna Beez"

DJ Khaled – Kiss The Ring

- 01. "Shout Out To The Real" (featuring Meek Mill, Ace Hood, and Plies)

Meek Mill – Dreams & Nightmares

- 03. "Young & Gettin' In" (featuring Kirko Bangz) (produced with TM88 & Southside)

Styles P – The Diamond Life Project

- 02. "Gripping Over There" (featuring French Montana and Pusha T)

Skyzoo – Theo vs. J.J. (Dreams vs. Reaality)

- 11. "#FGR (First Generation Rich)"

Avatar Darko – Soviet Goonion

- 13. "Terminator, Pt. 2"

Skyzoo – A Dream Deferred

- 06. "Range Over Rhythm"

Yo Gotti – CM7: The World Is Yours

- 15. "Ain't No Turning Around"

Jeezy – It's Tha World

- 02. "Knob Broke"

==== 2013 ====
Ace Hood – Starvation 2

- 14. "Motive" (featuring Kevin Cossom)

N.O.R.E. – Student of the Game

- 17. "Faces Of Death" (featuring Busta Rhymes, French Montana, Raekwon, and Swizz Beatz)

Kevin Gates – The Luca Brasi Story

- 21. "What's Understood"

French Montana – Excuse My Fresh

- 02. "Trap House" (featuring Birdman and Rick Ross)

Ash K – Relationships 101

- 02. "Bonnie & Clyde 13"

Problem – The Separation

- 15. "Do It" (featuring Tyga)

Cory Gunz – Datz WTF I'm Taklin Bout

- 13. "Demons" (featuring Charlie Rock)

Reese – DSNRTRAPN

- 04. "Wakebake" (featuring Buddy)

B Money – F.lip A.ll M.oney (advance)

- 02. Cakin
- 04. Daily On The Block (featuring Meek Mill and T.I.)

Yo Gotti – Nov 19: The Mixtape

- 08. "Sometimes"

Hardhead – Deliberate Mistakes

- 09. "Nameless Celebrities" (featuring Kid Ink and K-Shawn)

Trae Tha Truth – I Am King

- 13. "I Am King"

Casey Veggies & Rockie Fresh – Fresh Veggies

- 07. "Perception/Love All Around Me" (featuring Kirko Bangz)

Scoe – Tha Influence

- 03. "Hunnid Thousand"
- 07. "Where They At"

==== 2014 ====
Coke Boys – Coke Boys 4

- 09. "Worst Nightmare" (featuring Diddy)

N.O.R.E. – Noreaster

- 05. "#FACTS" (featuring Yung Reallie)

Skyzoo & Torae – Barrel Brothers

- 03. "Make You A Believer"

Young Scrap – Faded Ambition

- 06. "Hot Nigga" (freestyle)

Ace Hood – Body Bag 3: Beast Mix

- 06. "Hot Nigga" (Beast mix)

Batgang – 4B's

04. "Where Dey At" (performed by Kid Ink, Shitty Montana, and King Los)

Problem – 354: Lift Off

- 04. "Hot Nigga" (featuring Bobby Shmurda)

Rich The Kid – Rich Than Famous

- 04. "Don't Love You"
- 06. "Wrist Gone Crazy"

==== 2015 ====
Juicy J – Blue Dream & Lean 2

- 03. "Throw Dem Racks"

Dok2 – Multillionaire

- 06. "Spirit of Ecstasy"

The Game – The Documentary 2

- 05. "Standing on Ferraris" (featuring Diddy)

Meek Mill – Single

- 01. "Monster" (The Get Back Freestyle)

Rick Ross – Black Market

- 07. "Crocodile Python"

Jay Park

- Lotto

==== 2016 ====
Torae – Entitled

- 06. "Let 'Em Know"

Beanie Sigel -

- Top Shotta

Royce da 5'9" – Tabernacle: Trust the Shooter

- 08. "Rap on Steroids"

Tink – Single

- 01. "Count It Up" (Think Tink)

Meek Mill – DC4

- 13. "Tony Story 3"

Juelz Santana – TBA

- Time Ticking (with Dave East featuring Rowdy Rebel and Bobby Shmurda
- Ol' Thang Back (featuring Jadakiss, Busta Rhymes, Method Man & Redman)

==== 2017 ====
Juelz Santana – TBA

- The Get Back (featuring A Boogie Wit da Hoodie)
