= Eskeerdo =

American rapper

- Also known as: Xplicit
- Born: Alexander Izquierdo; March 23, 1988 (age 38); Hialeah, Florida, United States
- Label: HIA Entertainment

Alexander Izquierdo, better known by the stage names Eskeerdo and Xplicit, is a Cuban-American rapper and songwriter from Hialeah, Florida. He released his first EP, Eskeerdo, in 2015. He is known for being a member of the production team The Monsters & Strangerz.

== Songwriting ==
Eskeerdo's first placement as a songwriter was the song Diddy Bop for P. Diddy.

=== Songwriting credits ===
Year	Song	Artist	Album	Details
2009	"Diddy Boppin' '"	Diddy featuring Yung Joc & Xplicit	Diddy Boppin	Writer
2010	"Million Dollar Girl"	Trina featuring Diddy & Keri Hilson	Amazin'	Writer
2010	"Showin Out"	Trina	Amazin'	Writer
2010	"Nothing Like LA"	Ice Cube	I Am the West	Writer
2010	"I Am Not the One"	Maino	The Art of War Mixtape	Writer
2010	"Turn Around (5,4,3,2,1)"	Flo Rida	Only One Flo (Part 1)	Writer
2010	"Turnaround (5,4,3,2,1) Remix"	Flo Rida featuring Pitbull	Hangover 2 The Movie	Writer
2010	"Hey Cutie"	Soulja Boy featuring Trey Songz	The DeAndre Way	Writer
2010	"Poppin Bottles"	T.I. featuring Drake	No Mercy	Writer
2011	"My House"	Big Sean	Finally Famous Album	Writer
2012	"Vans On"	T. Mills	TBA	Writer
2012	"Countless"	Alley Boy	Nigganati	Writer
2012	"2 Up"	Diggy Simmons	Unexpected Arrival	Writer
2012	"Unforgivable Blackness"	Diggy Simmons	Unexpected Arrival	Writer
2012	"I Need To Know"	Diggy Simmons	Unexpected Arrival	Writer
2012	"Tom Edison"	Diggy Simmons	Unexpected Arrival	Writer
2012	"What's Going On"	Diggy Simmons	Unexpected Arrival	Writer
2012	"MSG"	Diggy Simmons	Unexpected Arrival	Writer
2012	"Naked"	Kevin McCall featuring Big Sean	TBA	Writer
2012	"Burn"	Meek Mill featuring Big Sean	Dreams and Nightmares	Writer
2012	"I Don't Like (Remix)"	Chief Keef featuring GOOD Music & Jadakiss	Cruel Summer	Writer
2012	"Louder"	Flo Rida	Wild Ones	Writer
2012	"Mula"	Big Sean	Detroit Mixtape	Writer
2012	"Clique"	GOOD Music	Cruel Summer	Writer
2012	"Maybach Curtains"	Meek Mill	Dreams and Nightmares	Writer
2012	"No Love Allowed"	Rihanna	Unapologetic	Writer
2012	"All That (Lady)"	Game ft. Lil Wayne, Big Sean, Jeremih, Fabolous	Jesus Piece	Writer
2013	"Guap"	Big Sean	Hall of Fame	Writer
2013	"No Part of You"	98 Degrees	2.0	Writer
2013	"Mona Lisa"	Big Sean	Hall of Fame	Writer
2013	"Milf"	Big Sean ft. Nicki Minaj, Juicy J	Hall of Fame	Writer
2013	"Nothing Is Stopping You"	Big Sean	Hall of Fame	Writer
2013	"Beware"	Big Sean	Hall of Fame	Writer
2013	"Fire"	Big Sean	Hall of Fame	Writer
2013	"Mula"	Big Sean	Hall of Fame	Writer
2013	"Don't Come Around"	Yo Gotti	I Am	Writer
2014	"Change Your Mind"	Trey Songz	Trigga	Writer
2014	"Holy Ghost"	Juicy J featuring Lil Bibby	TBA	Writer
2014	"Don't Be Gone Too Long"	Chris Brown	X	Writer
2014	"Hustle Harder"	Common	Nobody Smiling	Writer
2014	"The Sleaze"	Wiz Khalifa	Blacc Hollywood	Writer
2014	"Not For Long"	B.o.B featuring Trey Songz	Single	Writer
2014	"Contigo Quiero Estar"	Thalía	Amore Mio	Writer
2015	"Run To Me"	Clarence Coffee	Home (soundtrack)	Writer
2015	"I Don't Like It, I Love It"	Flo Rida featuring Robin Thicke	My House (EP)	Writer
2015	"Here It Is"	Flo Rida featuring Chris Brown	My House (EP)	Writer
2015	"Done With Love"	Zedd	True Colors	Writer
2015	"The Blacker the Berry"	Kendrick Lamar	To Pimp a Butterfly	Writer
2015	"Powerful"	Jussie Smollett & Alicia Keys	Empire	Writer
2016	"Work from Home"	Fifth Harmony	7/27	Writer
2016	"Dangerously"	Charlie Puth	Nine Track Mind	Writer
2016	"Who's With Me"	Flo Rida	Single	Writer
2017	"Slow Hands"	Niall Horan	Single	Writer
2017	"Best 4 U"	Maroon 5	Red Pill Blues	Writer
2017	"Say All you Want For Christmas"	Nick Jonas & Shania Twain	Christmas EP	Writer
2017	"Lay Your Head On Me"	Juanes	Ferdinand (Original Motion Picture Soundtrack)	Writer
2017	"Gang Up (feat. PnB Rock)"	Young Thug, 2Chainz, Wiz Khalifa	The Fate of The Furious: The Album	Writer
2018	"Dancer"	Flo Rida	Single	Writer
2018	"Jump On It"	Sean Paul	Mad Love the Prequel	Writer
2018	"Solita (feat. Rich The Kid)"	Pretty Much	Single	Writer
2018	"Scared of the Dark (feat. XXXtentacion"	Lil Wayne, Ty Dolla $ign, XXXtentacion	Spider-Man: Into the Spider-Verse (Soundtrack from & Inspired by the Motion Picture)	Writer
2019	"Is It Just Me"	Backstreet Boys	DNA	Writer
2019	"In Your Arms (with X Ambassadors)"	Illenium feat. X Ambassadors	ASCEND	Writer
2019	"Bones and Blood"	John the Blind	John the Blind	Writer
2019	Fly	Lucky Daye	Mark Ronson Presents The Music of "Spies in Disguise"	Writer
2020	"Everywhere"	Niall Horan	Heartbreak Weather	Writer
2020	"Cross Your Mind"	Niall Horan	Heartbreak Weather	Writer
2020	"No Judgement"	Niall Horan	Heartbreak Weather	Writer
2020	"Black and White"	Niall Horan	Heartbreak Weather	Writer
2020	"Summer Feelings (feat. Charlie Puth"	Lennon Stella, Charlie Puth	SCOOB! Soundtrack	Executive Producer / Writer
2020	"Yikes"	Jack Harlow	SCOOB! Soundtrack	Executive Producer / Writer
2020	"I Fly (feat. Faouzia"	Galantis, Faouzia	SCOOB! Soundtrack	Executive Producer / Writer
2020	"Tick Tick Boom (feat. BygTwo3)"	Sage The Gemini	SCOOB! Soundtrack	Executive Producer / Writer
2020	"Be Like That (feat. Swae Lee & Khalid)"	Kane Brown	Mixtape, Vol. 1	Writer
2020	"Worship You"	Kane Brown	Mixtape, Vol. 1	Writer
2020	"Weeks"	Kevin Gates	single	Writer
2021	"Big feat. Gunna"	Rita Ora, David Guetta & Imanbek	single	Writer
2021	"Anyone"	Justin Bieber	Justice	Writer
2021	"2 Much"	Justin Bieber	Justice	Writer
2021	"Love You Different (feat. BEAM)"	Justin Bieber	Justice	Writer
2021	"Imagine"	Ben Platt	TBA	Writer
2021	"Lost"	Maroon 5	Jordi	Writer
2021	"My Guy"	Leon Bridges	Space Jam: A New Legacy (Original Motion Picture Soundtrack)	Writer
2021	"Chasing Stars"	Marshmello, Alesso, JamesBay	single	Writer
2021	"Broadway Girls (feat. Morgan Wallen)"	Lil Durk	single	Writer
2021	"Stupid/Asking"	Young Thug	Punk	Writer
2021	"Blondes"	Blu De Tiger	single	Writer
2021	"911"	Teddy Swims	single	Writer
