= Monster (Meek Mill song) =

Promotional single by Meek Mill
- Released: March 3, 2015
- Genre: Hip hop
- Length: 2:54
- Label: Dream Chasers; 215 Aphillyated; Maybach; Atlantic
- Songwriters: Robert Rahmeek Williams; Orlando Tucker
- Producer: Jahlil Beats

"Monster" is a song recorded by American rapper Meek Mill. It was released on March 3, 2015 but failed to make on the final track list of Meek Mill's second studio album, "Dreams Worth More Than Money" so the song was downgraded to a promotional single for the album. The song was produced by Jahlil Beats.

== Release ==
Monster was released on March 3, 2015 and also known as The Get Back Freestyle. The song failed to make on the final cut of "Dreams Worth More Than Money" so the song was downgraded to the second promotional single for the album.

== Music video ==
The video of Monster was released on May 20, 2015 on YouTube. The video shows Meek Mill and his friends visiting the game center where they did in-line skating.

== Commercial performance ==
Monster debuted and peaked at number 96 on Billboard Hot 100 for the chart dated March 21, 2015.

== Charts ==
Chart (2015)	Peak position
US Billboard Hot 100	96
US Hot R&B/Hip-Hop Songs (Billboard)	30
