= Introduction =

Concept of introducing

"Introduction" headpiece of New Orleans: The Place and the People (1895)

President of the Philippines Rodrigo Duterte introduces members of his cabinet to Malaysian Prime Minister Mahathir Mohamad during a welcome ceremony at the Malacañang Palace in March 2019

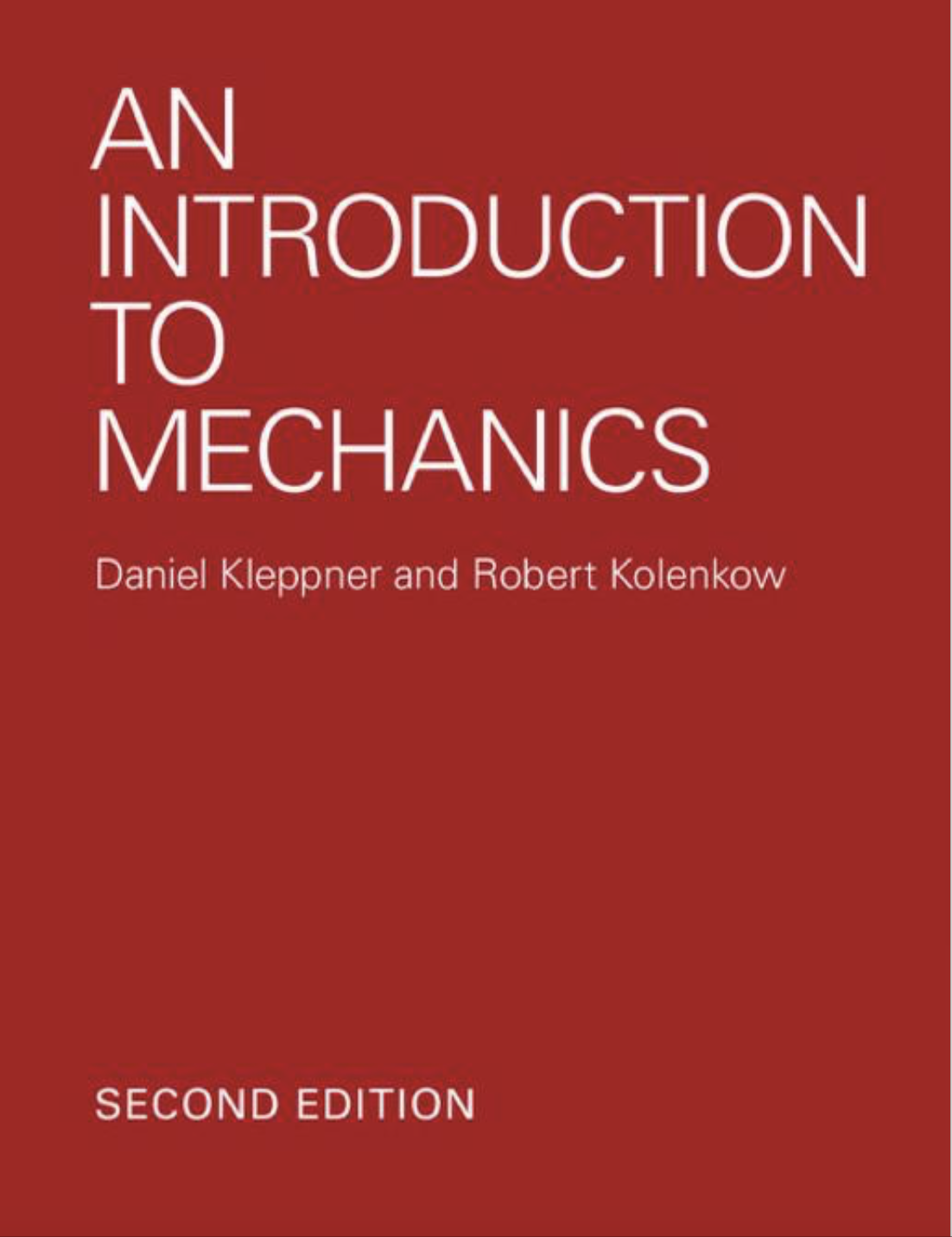
Cover of An Introduction to Mechanics, a textbook for a course designed to give students a basic understanding of a topic covered more extensively in later courses

Introductory session at a conference where the concept of Wikipedia is initially explained to an audience

An introduction is an act of presenting, framing, or making a person, idea, object, or other subject known to an audience, usually done intentionally and typically for the purpose of establishing familiarity and shaping the audience's initial perception or understanding of who or what is being introduced. The audience may range from a single individual to a large population, and the introduction may concern something entirely new or something already known in other contexts. The introduction itself can range from a few words spoken on behalf of the person or thing being introduced, to a book-length examination or semester-length academic course designed to familiarize the audience with a complex topic. Through the circumstances, manner, and content of an introduction, the person or organization making it may seek to influence the first impressions of those receiving it. Introductions occur in various contexts, including the initial presentation of people to others, the communication of new ideas, and the unveiling of products or designs. In forms of communication such as text writing and music, an introduction may also be an opening portion of a larger work that prepares the reader or listener for the broader themes of the work that follows.

== Etymology ==
The word introduction comes from Middle English introduccioun or introduccyon, borrowed from Old French introduction, itself derived from Latin intrōductiō, meaning "a leading in", from intrōdūcere ("to lead in" or "to bring in"), combining intro- ("inward") and dūcere ("to lead").

The word is recorded as having been used in English by the late 14th century, in the sense of bringing something into existence. By the mid-15th century, it had acquired meanings relating to initial instruction in a subject or an introductory statement, and by the 1520s, was used to describe an elementary treatise on a subject. The specifically interpersonal sense of formally presenting one person to another is recorded from 1711, though the verb introduce was used in the sense of establishing a personal acquaintance by the 1650s.

The term retains a broader meaning of bringing something into a place, environment, practice, or use, without necessarily involving either intentional action or presentation to an audience. Examples include the introduction of a species into a new geographic area, and the introduction of new technologies or procedures into an established industries or practices. While these meanings are distinguishable from an introduction intentionally designed to establish familiarity with the person, subject, or object introduced, these meanings may also overlap, as when a new product is introduced into commercial use through a public presentation or marketing effort.

== Introduction as a means of engineering a first impression ==
An introduction can serve as a means of engineering a first impression, an initial mental image or assessment formed upon encountering a previously unfamiliar person, object, idea, or experience. Impression accuracy varies depending on the observer and the target (person, object, scene, etc.) being observed. First impressions are based on a wide range of characteristics: age, race, culture, language, gender, physical appearance, accent, posture, voice, number of people present, economic status, and time allowed to process. The first impressions individuals give to others could greatly influence how they are treated and viewed in many contexts of everyday life.

Impression management is a conscious or subconscious process in which people attempt to influence the perceptions of other people about a person, object or event by regulating and controlling information in social interaction. It was first conceptualized by Erving Goffman in 1956 in The Presentation of Self in Everyday Life, and then was expanded upon in 1967. Impression management behaviors include accounts (providing "explanations for a negative event to escape disapproval"), excuses (denying "responsibility for negative outcomes"), and opinion conformity ("speak(ing) or behav(ing) in ways consistent with the target"), along with many others. By utilizing such behaviors, those who partake in impression management are able to control others' perception of them or events pertaining to them. Impression management is possible in nearly any situation, such as in sports (wearing flashy clothes or trying to impress fans with their skills), or on social media (only sharing positive posts). Impression management can be used with either benevolent or malicious intent.

Impression management is usually used synonymously with self-presentation, in which a person tries to influence the perception of their image. The notion of impression management was first applied to face-to-face communication, but then was expanded to apply to computer-mediated communication. The concept of impression management is applicable to academic fields of study such as psychology and sociology as well as practical fields such as corporate communication and media. First impressions are affected by whether the audience being introduced is an individual or a number of people. Joint experiences are more globally processed (see global precedence for more on processing), as in collectivist cultures. Global processing emphasizes first impressions more because the collective first impression tends to remain stable over time. Solo experiences tend to facilitate local processing, causing the viewer to take a more critical look at the target. Thus, individuals are more likely to have negative first impressions than groups of two or more viewers of the same target. At the same time, individuals are more likely to experience an upward trend over the course of a series of impressions, e.g. individual viewers will like the final episode of a TV season more than the first even if it is really the same quality. When viewing pieces of art in an experiment, participants in a solo context rated art in an improving sequence significantly higher than when the targets are presented in a declining sequence. When viewing the art in a joint context, participants evaluated the first and last pieces similarly in both kinds of sequence. Simply priming viewers to feel like they were in solo or joint contexts or to process analytically or holistically was enough to produce the same viewing effects.

Impression management can be found in all social interactions, whether real or imaginary, and is governed by a range of factors. The characteristics of a given social situation are important; specifically, the surrounding cultural norms determine the appropriateness of particular nonverbal behaviors. The actions and exchange have to be appropriate to the targets, and within that culture's norms. Thus, the nature of the audience and its relationship with the speaker influences the way impression management is realized. Awareness of being a potential subject of monitoring is also crucial. A person's goals inform the strategies of impression management, and can influence how they are received. This leads to distinct ways of presenting the self. Self-efficacy describes whether a person is convinced that it is possible to convey the intended impression. Conmen, for instance, can rely on their ability to emanate self-assuredness in the process of gaining a mark's trust.

== Specific kinds of introductions ==
=== Introduction of people ===
In social and formal settings, introductions establish respectful interactions, and facilitate an initial conversation, possibly leading to future collaboration. Introduction of people can serve a variety of purposes, including purely social and potentially romantic purposes, or networking and business purposes. An introduction may be initiated by a person introducing themselves to another, or by a third party seeking to establish an acquaintance between two or more other people. In a self-introduction, a person presents themselves to another individual or group with information selected to establish a particular first impression, or provide a basis for further conversation. Self-introductions can range from an informal exchange of names to a prepared account of a person's background or qualifications, particularly when undertaken in a professional setting. With respect to a third party introducing two people to one another, the introduction can be reciprocal, simultaneously presenting each person to the other and potentially influencing the initial impressions formed by both. The manner and order of introduction can also reflect social etiquette, including conventions concerning age, professional position, and social status. Research on naturally occurring introductions has found that introductions initiated by a mutual acquaintance tend to be preferred over self-initiated introductions.

Introductions of individuals to larger audiences differ from interpersonal introductions in that they generally do not seek to establish a reciprocal personal acquaintance between the person introduced and every member of the audience. In organized events, such as conferences, ceremonies, and public presentations, an organizer, master of ceremonies, or other participant may formally introduce a keynote speaker, presenter, or honoree. Such an introduction need not establish a first acquaintance between the person being introduced and the audience, as the speaker may already be well known, but instead serves as a framing device to establish that person's role in the event, explain their qualifications or relationship to the subject being addressed, and shape the audience's expectations of the presentation. Although such introductions are commonly delivered by a third party, the person being introduced may participate in preparing or writing the introduction, thereby influencing the manner in which they are presented to the audience.

=== Introduction of concepts ===
In academic contexts, the term "introduction" is frequently used to denote an entry-level overview or initial course of study, with educational programs offering "Introduction to [field/subject]" courses designed to provide foundational knowledge. For example, "Introduction to Philosophy" or "Introduction to Economics" courses are designed to present key concepts, methods, and historical development in a subject area. Key texts designed for such courses, or to provide lay readers with the level of knowledge that would be obtained through an introductory course of study, are often titled accordingly, such as Introduction to Electrodynamics, Introduction to Lattices and Order, and Introduction to Objectivist Epistemology.

In American university course numbering systems, the number 101 is often used for an introductory course at a beginner's level in a department's subject area. This common numbering system was designed to make transfer between colleges easier. It can also indicate a course for students not intending to major in the subject; e.g. a student intending to major in English would take English 111 not English 101.

Within highly specialized academic fields, the term "introductory" can be somewhat misleading. A course that may serve as a starter for students already familiar with foundational concepts can remain well beyond the reach of a lay audience. For instance, an "Introduction to Quantum Mechanics" offered to upper-level physics majors presupposes extensive knowledge of mathematics and classical physics, making it complex and inaccessible to someone whose background lies entirely outside of those areas. An "introduction" course is therefore contextual, introducing a next higher level of ideas relative to an existing knowledge base in the discipline, not necessarily to the public at large.

=== Introductions in commerce ===
The introduction of new commercial products to the market is a substantial element of marketing and new product development. Businesses introduce products and services to prospective customers and other interested parties with the aim of establishing awareness, communicating their characteristics and potential benefits, and influencing perceptions of their value. A product introduction may involve decisions concerning the intended audience, timing, positioning, pricing, advertising, and distribution.

The introduction of a product is commonly preceded by market research, product development, and testing, and forms part of the broader process of commercialization. The introduction itself may be a methodical process extending beyond a single announcement or product launch event, particularly in industrial markets, where the introduction of technical products may involve identification of applications and communication of the product's advantages over existing alternatives. Research comparing more than 1,000 introductions of consumer and industrial products finds substantial differences in the marketing strategies and tactics associated with each, including differences in product positioning, pricing, distribution, and promotion.

Public introductions may take the form of highly orchestrated events, like Apple product announcements and Tesla vehicle unveilings. Commercial introductions may begin well before a product becomes available for purchase, through product announcements and other forms of marketing communications directed not just to prospective customers, but to investors, suppliers and distributors, potential competitors, and other participants in the market. Commercial introductions can be designed to generate anticipation or word-of-mouth interest, with research finding that exposure to other consumers' anticipation of an unreleased product can influence perceptions of quality and willingness to buy.

=== Introductions in creative works ===
In writing, an introduction is an opening section of a written work that presents its subject and prepares the reader for the material that follows. In academic writing, an introduction commonly establishes the context and purpose of the work and may present its central argument or thesis statement. Longer works, such as books, may contain an introduction distinct from a preface or foreword.

In music, the introduction is a passage or section which opens a movement or a separate piece, preceding the theme or lyrics. In popular music, this is often known as the song intro or just the intro. The introduction may establish the tempo or mood of the work, as well as melodic, harmonic, or rhythmic material related to the main body of a piece. Introductions may consist of an ostinato that is used in the following music, an important chord or progression that establishes the tonality and groove for the following music, or they may be important but disguised or out-of-context motivic or thematic material. As such, the introduction may be the first statement of primary or other important material, may be related to but different from the primary or other important material, or may bear little relation to any other material. A common introduction to a rubato ballad is a dominant seventh chord with a fermata, an introduction that works for many songs is the last four or eight measures of the song, while a common introduction to the twelve-bar blues is a single chorus. If a movement in sonata form begins with an introductory section, this introduction is typically not considered part of the movement's exposition.

In film, the introduction of a fictional character serves to establish the audience's initial understanding of the character's personality, abilities, motivations, and role in the narrative, utilizing elements including appearance, dialogue, actions, and cinematography. For example, in the opening scene of The Godfather (1972), the character of Vito Corleone is initially concealed from view while another character petitions him for assistance, before being revealed as a powerful figure whose quiet manner contrasts with his considerable authority. In Raiders of the Lost Ark (1981), Indiana Jones is introduced through a self-contained adventure involving exploration of a booby-trapped temple, establishing both his resourcefulness and his vulnerability to danger, all before the principal narrative even begins to unfold. The Star Wars films employ contrasting approaches to character introduction. Darth Vader first appears in Star Wars (1977) as an imposing, black-clad figure entering a captured spacecraft amid the aftermath of a violent assault, immediately establishing his threatening presence. By contrast, Obi-Wan Kenobi is initially presented as an elderly hermit who comes to the rescue of Luke Skywalker, with his greater knowledge and importance gradually revealed. In The Empire Strikes Back (1980), Yoda initially appears as an eccentric, mischievous creature whose true power is concealed while he tests Luke's patience, using a deliberately misleading first impression to create a subsequent revelation.
