= Amen (Meek Mill song) =

2012 single by Meek Mill featuring Drake

Single by Meek Mill featuring Drake

from the album Dreams and Nightmares and Dreamchasers 2
- Released: June 19, 2012
- Recorded: 2012
- Genre: Hip hop
- Length: 4:47
- Label: 215 Aphillyated; Maybach; Warner Bros.
- Songwriters: Robert Williams; Jeremy Felton; Aubrey Graham; Dwane Weir II; Lester Abrams; Michael McDonald
- Producers: Key Wane; Jahlil Beats

Meek Mill singles chronology
"So Sophisticated" (2012)	"Amen" (2012)	"My Moment" (2012)

Drake singles chronology
"Pop That" (2012)	"Amen" (2012)	"Crew Love" (2012)

Music video
- "Amen" on YouTube

"Amen" is a song by American rapper Meek Mill from his debut studio album, Dreams and Nightmares (2012). Featuring Canadian rapper Drake, the song includes background vocals from Jeremih. It was produced by Key Wane and Jahlil Beats, with the first serving as a songwriter alongside the vocalists. Due to the interpolation of the Doobie Brothers' "Minute by Minute", written by Lester Abrams and Michael McDonald, they also received songwriting credits. The song was thought of by Key Wane in New York's Times Square, after he prayed when experiencing failure.

On June 19, 2012, it was released for digital download and streaming as the album's lead single by Maybach Music Group and Warner Bros. Records. At the time of release, Philadelphia reverend Jomo K. Johnson encouraged boycotting the song over alleged usage of the church for sinful activities, leading to the two debating publicly on Hot 107.9. Mill eventually apologized for any offense and Johnson called off the boycott, forgiving him. A hip hop number with pop and R&B elements, the song relies on a gospel beat, with lyrics focused on sexual exploitation and wealth.

"Amen" received widespread acclaim from music critics, who generally praised Mill's rap style. Some highlighted it as a step-up for him, while other critics complimented the beat. In the United States, the song reached number 57 on the Billboard Hot 100 and number 5 on the Hot R&B/Hip-Hop Songs chart in 2012. It has since been certified gold in the US by the Recording Industry Association of America (RIAA). An accompanying music video was released to YouTube on June 15, 2012. In the video, footage of Drake's Club Paradise Tour is juxtaposed with him and Mill partying at night. The two performed the song live at the Fillmore on Mill's Dreamchasers Tour in August 2012.

== Background ==
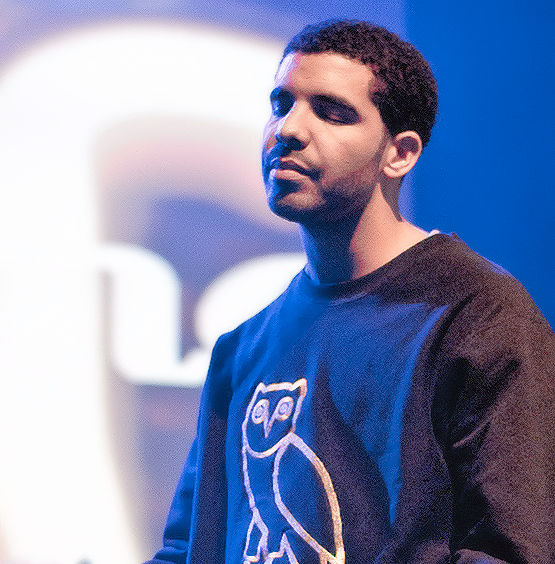
The song marked Mill's first collaboration with Drake, whom he later became close friends with.

American record producer Key Wane described how he came up with "Amen" as "a prime example of God being real", remembering being stranded with no money in New York's Times Square and not knowing how to return to Detroit. The producer felt like he was on the verge of failure, praying: "Lord, change my situation if you feel like my situation needs to be changed." He then met Mill and gave him the song, advising the studio team against heavy usage of equipment and rather to maintain a relationship with God through prayer. The song was produced by Key Wane and Jahlil Beats, the latter of whom co-wrote it with Mill, singer Jeremih, Drake, Lester Abrams, and Michael McDonald, with the final two receiving credits due to having wrote the interpolated work.

Mill remembered playing "Amen" for the likes of XXL editor Shaheem Reid in Los Angeles, envisioning it as a hit and listeners singing along. The song went through several alterations at a Los Angeles studio, and Mill identified it as an example of him "set[ting] up a hit", through hearing the beat and crafting it "into what I want to make it into". Mill wrote "Amen" to thank God for the best things in his life. Drake became a fan upon hearing the song and quickly sending it back to Mill. Mill and Drake's collaboration on "Amen" in 2012 marked their first involvement with each other. The two developed a friendship afterwards and were seen multiple times in public, including performing and partying together. Mill collaborated with the musician a second time on his single "R.I.C.O." in 2015, the same year as the two experienced a fallout.

In January 2012, Mill started recording the album and went on to release some of the tracks on his ninth mixtape, Dreamchasers 2, including "Amen". The song was premiered via SoundCloud on May 4, 2012. It was then included on Dreamchasers 2, released three days later, before being released as a single for Dreams and Nightmares in June 2012. The mixtape release credits Drake and Jeremih as featured artists, while only Drake is credited on the album version despite them both having vocals.

== Composition and lyrics ==
Musically, "Amen" is a hip hop number, with elements of pop and R&B. It contains an interpolation of the 1979 single "Minute by Minute", as performed by the Doobie Brothers and written by Abrams alongside McDonald. The song relies on a minimal gospel beat, prominently supported by church organs. It is also backed by piano, over which Mill lowers his tone by a few octaves. Michael Madden of Consequence noted that Mill conveys energy with his flow, while Exclaim!'s Chayne Japal thought he raps with urgency.

Throughout "Amen", Mill and Drake speak of sexual exploitation and excessive wealth. Mill demonstrates innocence at the start of the song, thanking God for "all the pretty women he let into my life". On the hook, Mill raps about those accompanying him and adds amen at the end of each line. Mill also alters the hook from fellow rapper Rick Ross's 2012 song "Holy Ghost" to appeal to more women: "In that dress she look like the devil but I let her innn [sic]."

== Release and critical reception ==
On June 19, 2012, the song was released for digital download and streaming in various countries as the lead single from the album by Mill's labels Maybach and Warner Bros. It was a success on radio stations in the United States. "Amen" was later included as the seventh track of Mill's debut studio album, Dreams and Nightmares, on October 30. The song was met with widespread acclaim from music critics, with general praise for Mill's rap style. Rap Radar listed "Amen" as the seventh best song of 2012, with Paul "Big Homie" Duong asserting that Mill takes everyone "to church"; he highlighted Mill's celebratory lyricism and Drake's appearance. Pitchfork's Jayson Greene picked the song as the best new track on May 8, 2012. He said that "Amen" finds Mill abandoning his previous style and sounding like "a cocky young rap star" on the mixtape's "early highlight". Greene described the song as "a gospel-clapping, organ-greased cookout beat", which would be usual for fellow rapper Kanye West making jokes over, while Mill's first song sounds "more like a victory lap than a wind sprint". In a similar review at PrefixMag, Charlie Kaplan named the song as the album's best due to the "joyous and gorgeous gospel beat" that is aided by Mill and Drake's impressions of West's 2004 debut album, The College Dropout, further highlighting it as the only instance where the rapper is victorious in "breaking out of his mold". Japal from Exclaim! praised the song as a "sacrilegious celebration", which explains why Mill "raps with such an impassioned sense of urgency". Writing for Rolling Stone, Jody Rosen highlighted that Mill "cleverly tweaks sex-rap clichés". Madden from Consequence praised Mill's exhilaration, writing that Mill used "his high-energy flow" to go through the pop and R&B styles.

Jess Cataldo of Slant Magazine thought Mill utilized his charisma to create a "breez[y] material, like the backyard-barbecue anthem" that is "a sunny, lighthearted" number, supported by the prominent organ. In AllMusic, David Jeffries was taken aback by Mill's arrogance at the song's opening line. For Billboard, Erika Ramirez wrote that Mill still "toy[ed] with his abundance of riches" on the "summer hit". In 2017, Michael Saponara from the same publication ranked "Amen" as Mill's sixth best song and said that he "collided [with Drake] on the churchy [...] track", while also praising Jeremih's angelic backing vocals. Mosi Reeves was more lukewarm at Spin; he noted that Mill "uncharacteristically lowers his tone a few octaves" over the gospel-influenced piano and said the song is good, yet "reads like old news" on Dreams and Nightmares since it had been released previously. PopMatters editor Matthew Fiander considered the song one of the album's "safe choices", believing that it "would [have been] a revelation" if not already included on Dreamchasers 2.

== Controversy ==
On July 10, 2012, North Philadelphia reverend Jomo K. Johnson, from Mill's hometown, pushed for a boycott of "Amen". He declared that he is a hip hop fan, yet it is needed to properly call Mill out "and say enough is enough", with the rapper seemingly making usage of the church "as a backdrop and a parallel for some of the sinful things that he does". Johnson also encouraged Christians that are rap fans across his city to boycott the rapper until he acknowledged "this blatant disrespect", using his religious position to "revoke Meek's 'hood pass' until this happens". On July 11, 2012, Mill argued with Johnson over the boycott on Hot 107.9's The Q Deezy Show, debating that the reverend was using it to gather fame and saying he might have helped him in other situations. Johnson credited Mill for his talent, yet opposed his usage of it and ultimately accused him of lying in his music, while the rapper accused him of sounding like "a psycho". On July 16, 2012, Mill apologized for any offense caused by "Amen" on BET's music show 106 & Park, explaining that people are offended by all types of things and he meant no disrespect to any religion. Johnson responded by calling off the boycott and granting Mill forgiveness, though made clear his intentions to not support him in any way.

In an interview with Billboard, rapper Lecrae was asked what he thought of the controversy over "Amen" and responded that he was not bothered if a rapper does not value a word or know the meaning. Lecrae compared the situation to being mad at a "blind person bumping into you", clarifying that one shows them where to sit rather than becoming angry and his interest was fully set in helping people understand terms. Christian rap artists the Ambassador and Da' T.R.U.T.H. also commented on the controversy in interviews, voicing their appreciation of Johnson taking a public stand against the song. However, Da' T.R.U.T.H. stated that there was a possibility that Johnson could have reasoned more with Mill in the radio debate instead of only making blanket statements.

== Commercial performance ==
For the issue date of July 7, 2012, "Amen" entered the US Billboard Hot 100 at number 86. The song later peaked at number 57 on the Hot 100 and by October 23; it had sold 330,000 downloads. "Amen" lasted for 18 weeks on the chart. On June 9, 2012, the song debuted at number 67 on the US Hot R&B/Hip-Hop Songs chart. It reached the top 10 of the Hot R&B/Hip-Hop Songs chart at number 8 on the week of August 18, 2012. The song climbed three places to peak at number five the next week with a 10 percent airplay and 2 million audience gain, becoming Mill's first top-five hit as a lead artist on the chart. It remained at the position through to the week of September 8, 2012. On the year-end Hot R&B/Hip-Hop Songs chart for 2012, the song ranked at number 43. It further peaked at number four on the component US Hot Rap Songs chart for the issue dated September 8, 2012. On July 22, 2015, "Amen" received a gold certification from the Recording Industry Association of America (RIAA) for amassing 500,000 certified units in the United States.

== Music video and promotion ==
The music video for "Amen" premiered at midnight on June 15, 2012, via Mill's YouTube account. It was directed by DRE Films, a director for Maybach. The video opens with Mill waking up in the bed of his hotel room accompanied by women, following a party the night before. Mill leaves his bed to get dressed, and the rest of his crew do the same, getting up from the floor and bathtubs. He shows off his wealth in footage from the previous night with Drake, accompanied by bottles of liquor, expensive cars, and an entourage. These celebrations are juxtaposed with clips of Mill's stint for Drake's Club Paradise Tour, which adds cameos from the opening rap acts, such as J. Cole, Waka Flocka Flame, and French Montana. Mill and Drake also visit the Philadelphia Museum of Art to perform "Amen", in addition to the Miami Beach nightclub LIV. For the video's conclusion, Mill's tour set fades into the background.

Mill and Drake performed the song at a concert in Detroit for the Club Paradise Tour on May 31, 2012. The two later delivered a performance of it at the Fillmore in Silver Spring, Maryland for Mill's Dreamchasers Tour on August 24. Drake's appearance shocked the crowd with excitement, and Mill shouted before the performance: "I'm having the greatest time of my life!" At the 2012 BET Hip Hop Awards, Mill performed a rendition of the song as he wore a black sweater with leather sleeves, sunglasses, and various jewelry items, such as a jesus piece. On August 3, 2012 rapper the Game released a remix of "Amen", featuring Jason Weaver. For the remix, the Game reflects on current events and his life from a personal standpoint.

== Credits and personnel ==
Information taken from Dreams and Nightmares liner notes.

- Meek Mill – songwriter
- Key Wane – songwriter, producer
- Jeremy Felton – songwriter
- Aubrey Graham – songwriter
- Lester Abrams – songwriter
- Michael McDonald – songwriter
- Jahlil Beats – producer
- Finis "KY" White – mixer

== Charts ==
=== Weekly charts ===
Chart performance for "Amen"
Chart (2012)	Peak position
US Billboard Hot 100	57
US Hot R&B/Hip-Hop Songs (Billboard)	5
US Hot Rap Songs (Billboard)	4

=== Year-end charts ===
2012 year-end chart performance for "Amen"
Chart (2012)	Position
US Hot R&B/Hip-Hop Songs (Billboard)	41
US Hot Rap Songs (Billboard)	25

== Certifications ==
Certifications for "Amen"
Region	Certification	Certified units/sales
United States (RIAA)	Gold	500,000^{‡}
^{‡} Sales+streaming figures based on certification alone.
