= Dreamchasers 2 =

Mixtape by Meek Mill
- Released: May 7, 2012
- Recorded: 2011–12
- Genre: Hip-hop
- Length: 73:39
- Labels: MMG; Warner Bros.
- Producers: All Star; Beat Billionaire; Cardiak; Davgainz; Jahlil Beats; Key Wane; Sam Sneaker; SAP; Southside; The Beat Bully; Reginald Smith; Jesse Wilson; Syk Sense; E. Banga; The Weeknd; Doc McKinney; Davgainz

Meek Mill chronology
Dreamchasers (2011)	Dreamchasers 2 (2012)	Dreams and Nightmares (2012)

Dreamchasers 2 is the ninth mixtape by American rapper Meek Mill (hosted by DJ Drama). It was released on May 7, 2012, by Maybach Music Group and Warner Bros. Records, and also released for digital download on DatPiff. It serves as the second installment in the Dreamchasers series, following Dreamchasers (2011). The mixtape features guest appearances from American rappers Travis Scott, Rick Ross, Fabolous, French Montana, Wale, Big Sean, Kendrick Lamar, Mac Miller, 2 Chainz and Canadian rapper Drake – along with singing vocals by Jeremih, Trey Songz and Jordanne; as well as production that was provided by Jahlil Beats, SAP, All Star, Cardiak, Reginald Smith, and Jesse Wilson, among others. The mixtape consists mostly of original material, including a remix to Meek Mill's single from his previous mixtape Dreamchasers, "House Party", and a cover of Drake's "The Ride".

Due to its release a month prior, the mixtape was highly anticipated that has been resulted into a high traffic, causing DatPiff to crash upon the mixtapes eventual release. The mixtape quickly became the most popular mixtape release of all-time on that site, with over 1.5 million downloads within 6 hours of release and over 2.5 million downloads within 24 hours. Meek Mill announced on his Twitter that he would be releasing four extended bonus tracks for a deluxe edition of Dreamchasers 2, which never happened. Instead, he released seven songs without tags. The third track, "Amen" was released as the lead single for Meek Mill's upcoming debut album Dreams and Nightmares, while the fourth track, "Burn" was released as the second single also for his upcoming debut album.

== Reception ==
=== Critical response ===
Professional ratings
Review scores
Source	Rating
DJBooth	3.5/5 stars
Pitchfork Media	7.4/10
XXL	(XL)

Upon its release Dreamchasers 2 received generally positive reviews from music critics. Jordan Sargent of Pitchfork Media gave the mixtape a 7.4 out of 10, saying "It won't play as important a role in his narrative as the first edition, and that's saying something considering D2 currently sits at 4.1 million downloads on DatPiff alone. But it is of equal quality to the mixtape that broke him big, and that can only mean good things." Carl Chery of XXL gave the mixtape an XL, saying "The tape reflects an evolution in Meek’s subject matter. While Dreamchasers documented Meek’s struggles, its sequel speaks on hardships in the past tense. At 20 tracks, Dreamchasers 2 is sort of a long-player, but it fulfills its purpose in prepping Meek’s fans for the main event.

Slava Kuperstein of HipHopDX gave the mixtape a positive review, saying "Meek can capably flow, but he’s not nearly the consistent presence on the mic as, say, a Young Jeezy or a Rick Ross—partly because he just flat-out refuses to switch up the delivery. Ultimately, a fairly strong guest list and a good ear for beats is enough to carry this project."

=== Accolades ===
The mixtape was named the 14th best album of 2012 by Complex Magazine. MTV also named the mixtape the 19th best album of 2012.

== Track listing ==
No.	Title	Producer(s)	Length
1.	"Intro"	The Beat Bully	2:03
2.	"Ready or Not"	All Star	4:16
3.	"Amen" (featuring Drake and Jeremih)	Key Wane; Jahlil Beats (co.)	4:47
4.	"Burn" (featuring Big Sean)	Jahlil Beats	3:34
5.	"A1 Everything" (featuring Kendrick Lamar)	Syk Sense	2:53
6.	"Use to Be" (featuring Jordanne)	Davgainz	5:01
7.	"Flexing"	Jahlil Beats	4:15
8.	"I Get It" (featuring Travi$ Scott)	Jesse Wilson; Reginald Smith (co.)	3:14
9.	"Errday" (featuring Rick Ross)	Cardiak	3:14
10.	"Racked Up Shawty" (featuring Fabolous and French Montana)	Southside	3:39
11.	"Lean Wit It"	Cardiak	3:58
12.	"Big Dreams"	All Star	3:21
13.	"Take U Home" (featuring Wale and Big Sean)	Beat Billionaire	4:22
14.	"The Ride"	Doc McKinney; The Weeknd	2:52
15.	"Face Down" (featuring Sam Sneaker, Trey Songz, and Wale)	Sam Sneaker	4:36
16.	"Str8 Like That" (featuring 2 Chainz and Louie V)	E. Banga	3:14
17.	"House Party (Remix)" (featuring Fabolous, Wale, and Mac Miller)	The Beat Bully	4:58
18.	"Real"	SAP	2:03
19.	"On My Way"	All Star	3:21
20.	"Outro"	All Star	2:23
Total length:			73:39

Sample credits

- "Ready or Not" contains a sample of "Ready or Not" as performed by The Fugees.
- "The Ride" contains a sample of "The Ride" as performed by Drake.
