= Ima Boss =

"I'm a Boss"

Single by Meek Mill featuring Rick Ross

from the album Self Made Vol. 1 and Dreamchasers
- Released: May 17, 2011
- Recorded: 2010
- Genre: Hip hop; trap
- Length: 4:11
- Label: Maybach Music Group; Warner
- Songwriters: Robert Williams; William Roberts II; Orlando Tucker
- Producer: Jahlil Beats

Meek Mill singles chronology
"Tupac Back" (2011)	"I'm a Boss" (2011)	"So Sophisticated" (2012)

DJ Khaled singles chronology
"Legendary" (2011)	"I'm a Boss (remix)" (2011)	"Take It to the Head" (2012)

Lil Wayne singles chronology
"Mirror" (2011)	"I'm a Boss (remix)" (2011)	"The Motto" (2011)

Birdman singles chronology
"Y.U. Mad" (2011)	"I'm a Boss (remix)" (2011)	"Born Stunna" (2012)

Music video
- "Ima Boss" on YouTube

Cover of the official remix

"I'm a Boss" is a hip hop song by American rapper Meek Mill, released on May 17, 2011, as the fifth single from the Maybach Music Group compilation album, Self Made Vol. 1. The song is also included on Meek Mill's mixtape, Dreamchasers. The song features MMG label boss and fellow rapper Rick Ross and was produced by Jahlil Beats. An instrumental version was featured on the soundtrack of NBA 2K13.

== Music video ==
The music video was released on August 31, 2011, and was directed by Benny Boom. Ace Hood, Young Chris and Wale make cameo appearances.

== Remix ==
On November 9, 2011, the official remix was released featuring T.I., Birdman, Lil Wayne, DJ Khaled, Rick Ross and Swizz Beatz. The song has peaked at #51 on the Billboard Hot 100.

== Track listing ==
Digital single

No.	Title	Writer(s)	Producer(s)	Length
1.	"Ima Boss" (featuring Rick Ross)	Robert Williams; William Roberts II; Orlando Tucker	Jahlil Beats	4:11

== Charts ==
=== Weekly charts ===
Chart (2011)	Peak position
US Billboard Hot 100	51
US Hot R&B/Hip-Hop Songs (Billboard)	16
US Hot Rap Songs (Billboard)	14

== Certifications ==
Region	Certification	Certified units/sales
United States (RIAA)	Platinum	1,000,000^{‡}
^{‡} Sales+streaming figures based on certification alone.
