= Dreamchasers =

Album

Mixtape by Meek Mill
- Released: August 11, 2011
- Recorded: 2010–11
- Genre: Hip-hop
- Length: 70:13
- Label: MMG
- Producer: A One; All Star; The Beat Bully; Southside; TM88; Lil Lody; 808 Mafia; Cardiak; Jahlil Beats; Lex Luger; T-Minus; Noah "40" Shebib; Nikhil "Kromatik" Seetharam

Meek Mill chronology
Mr. Philadelphia (2010)	Dreamchasers (2011)	Dreamchasers 2 (2012)

Singles from Dreamchasers
- 1. "House Party" Released: October 29, 2011

Dreamchasers is the eighth mixtape by American rapper Meek Mill (hosted by DJ Drama). It was released on August 11, 2011, by Maybach Music Group and on DatPiff and is the first installment in the Dreamchasers series. Dreamchasers features guest appearances by American rappers Young Chris, Rick Ross, Beanie Sigel, Mel Love, NH, Yo Gotti, and Young Pooh. Production includes A One, All Star, The Beat Bully, Jahlil Beats, and Lex Luger.

== Reception ==
=== Critical response ===
Professional ratings
Review scores
Source	Rating
Pitchfork	7.4/10
XXL	(XL)

Upon its release Dreamchasers received generally positive reviews from music critics. Jordan Sargent of Pitchfork Media gave the mixtape a 7.4 out of 10, saying "There are plenty of mid-tier rappers willing to merely ride out Lex Luger's wave, but Meek has enough dimensions to be in it for the long haul." Carl Chery of XXL gave the mixtape an XL, saying "Calling Dreamchasers a classic may be a bit of a stretch, but it undoubtedly precipitates anticipation for Meek’s eventual debut." Edwin Ortiz of HipHopDX gave the mixtape a positive review, saying "Dream Chasers is an extension of what Meek Mill solidified on Self Made Vol. 1: a young hungry emcee who has found the right supporting cast to push his brand of Rap. In any case, Meek Mill should have changed the title of this project, because frankly it seems like his dreams are fast becoming reality."

== Track listing ==
No.	Title	Producer(s)	Length
1.	"Intro"	Aone Beats	3:06
2.	"Get Dis Money"	All Star	4:00
3.	"House Party" (featuring Young Chris)	The Beat Bully	4:23
4.	"Ima Boss" (featuring Rick Ross)	Jahlil Beats	4:05
5.	"Dreamchasers" (featuring Beanie Sigel)	All Star	4:08
6.	"Tony Montana Freestyle"	Will-A-Fool	2:44
7.	"Body Count" (featuring Rick Ross)	Southside; Tarentino	3:01
8.	"Tony Story"	Jahlil Beats	4:29
9.	"Middle of Da Summer" (featuring Mel Love)	The Beat Bully	4:19
10.	"Work" (featuring Rick Ross)	Lex Luger	4:43
11.	"Realest U Ever Seen" (featuring NH)	All Star	3:40
12.	"I'm Me"	The Beat Bully	2:49
13.	"Derrick Rose" (featuring Mel Love)	All Star	4:50
14.	"Don't Panic" (featuring Rick Ross and Yo Gotti)	Lil Lody; TM88	3:15
15.	"Sparkles" (featuring Young Pooh)	Cardiak	4:09
16.	"Love Don't Live Here"	All Star	3:17
17.	"Y'all Don't Hear Me Freestyle"	Cardiak	2:45
18.	"I'm On One Freestyle"	T-Minus; Noah "40" Shebib; Nikhil "Kromatik" Seetharam	2:20
19.	"Won't Stop"	All Star	4:18
Total length:			70:13
