= Meek Mill discography =

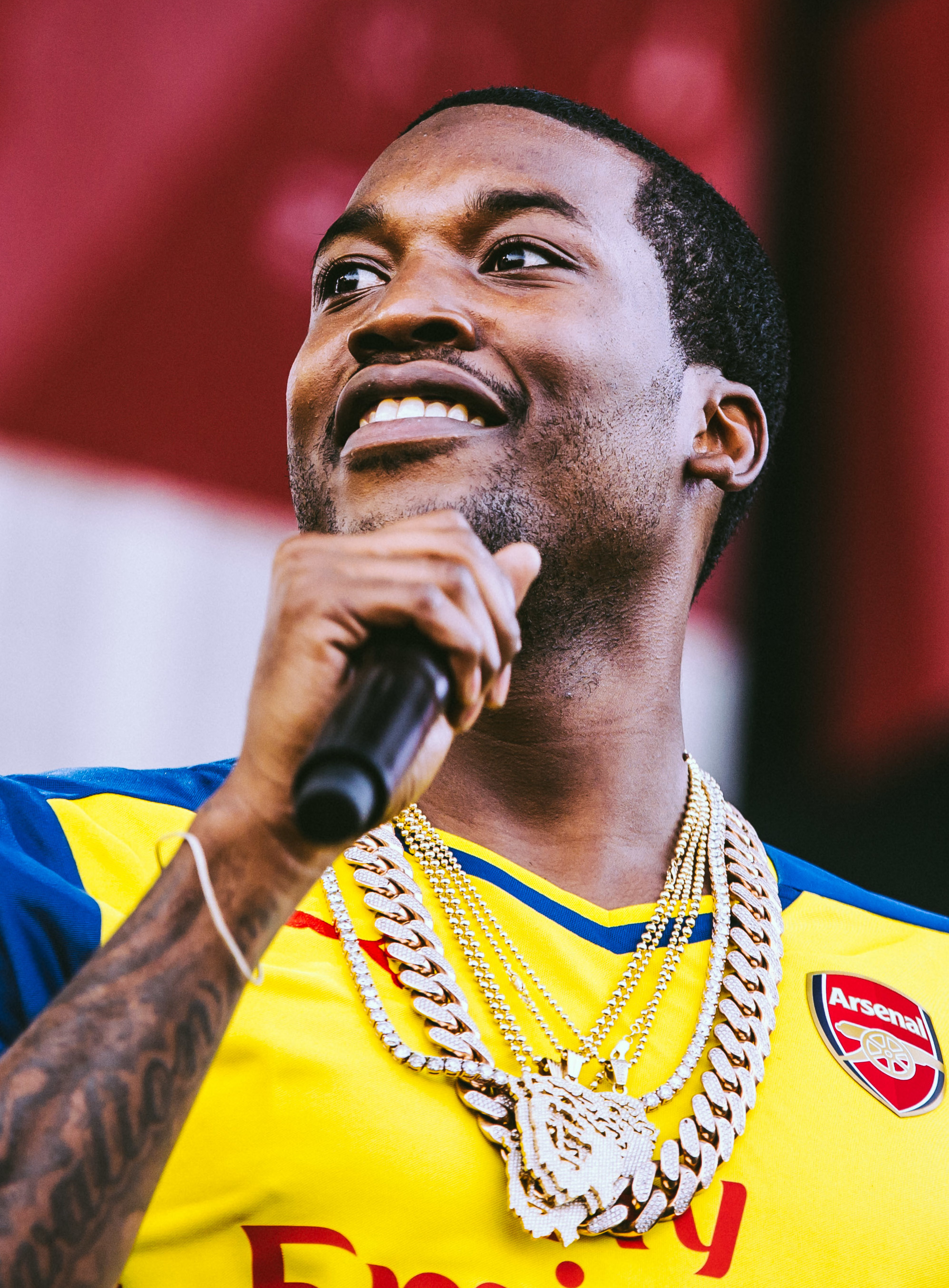
- Meek Mill performing in 2015
- Studio albums: 5
- Compilation albums: 1
- Singles: 54
- Music videos: 30
- Mixtapes: 11
- Promotional singles: 12
- Extended plays: 7
- Collaborative albums: 3

The discography of American rapper Meek Mill consists of five studio albums, seven extended plays, one compilation album, three collaborative albums, eleven mixtapes, fifty-four singles (including twenty-three as a featured artist), ten promotional singles and thirty music videos.

Meek Mill's debut studio album, Dreams and Nightmares, was released in October 2012 and spawned the singles, "Amen" (featuring Drake), "Burn" (featuring Big Sean), "Young & Gettin' It" (featuring Kirko Bangz) and "Believe It" (featuring Rick Ross). Meek Mill's second album, Dreams Worth More Than Money was released in June 2015. It reached number one on the US Billboard 200 and spawned the singles, "Check", "All Eyes on You" (featuring Nicki Minaj and Chris Brown) and "R.I.C.O." (featuring Drake). Meek Mill then released his third and fourth studio albums, Wins & Losses (2017) and Championships; the latter became his second number-one album on the Billboard 200 and featured his highest-charting single, "Going Bad" (featuring Drake), which peaked at number six on the Billboard Hot 100. His fifth studio album, Expensive Pain, was released on October 1, 2021.

== Albums ==
=== Studio albums ===
List of studio albums, with selected chart positions and sales figures
Title	Album details	Peak chart positions										Certifications
Title	Album details	US	US R&B/ HH	US Rap	AUS	CAN	FRA	IRE	NZ	SWE	UK	Certifications
Dreams and Nightmares	Released: October 30, 2012; Label: Maybach, Warner Bros.; Format: CD, digital download	2	1	1	—	6	199	—	—	—	67	RIAA: Gold
Dreams Worth More Than Money	Released: June 29, 2015; Label: Maybach, Atlantic; Format: CD, digital download	1	1	1	26	1	161	—	—	49	13	RIAA: Platinum; BPI: Silver
Wins & Losses	Released: July 21, 2017; Label: Maybach, Atlantic; Format: CD, digital download, streaming	3	2	2	91	17	121	—	—	—	21	RIAA: Gold
Championships	Released: November 30, 2018; Label: Maybach, Atlantic; Format: CD, digital download, streaming	1	1	1	30	1	83	39	34	22	33	RIAA: Platinum; MC: Platinum; BPI: Silver
Expensive Pain	Released: October 1, 2021; Label: Maybach, Atlantic; Format: Digital download, streaming	3	2	2	51	5	111	—	35	—	23	
"—" denotes a recording that did not chart or was not released in that territory.

=== Collaborative albums ===
List of collaborative albums, with selected chart positions and sales figures
Title	Album details	Peak chart positions					Sales
Title	Album details	US	US R&B/HH	US Rap	CAN	FRA	Sales
Self Made Vol. 1 (with Maybach Music Group)	Released: May 23, 2011; Label: Maybach, Warner Bros.; Format: CD, digital download	5	1	1	—	—	US: 183,000 (first week)
Self Made Vol. 2 (with Maybach Music Group)	Released: June 26, 2012; Label: Maybach, Warner Bros.; Format: CD, digital download	4	1	1	37	—	
Self Made Vol. 3 (with Maybach Music Group)	Released: September 17, 2013; Label: Maybach, Atlantic; Format: CD, digital download	4	1	1	—	182	US: 66,000 (first week)
Too Good to Be True (with Rick Ross)	Released: November 10, 2023; Label: Maybach, Gamma; Format: CD, digital download	23	7	5	71	—	
"—" denotes a recording that did not chart or was not released in that territory.

=== Compilation albums ===
List of compilation albums
Title	Album details
Nothing but Flamerz	Released: March 17, 2010; Label: 215 Aphillyated Records; Format: Digital download

=== Commercial mixtapes ===
Title	Album details	Peak chart positions						
Title	Album details	US	US R&B/ HH	US Rap	AUS	CAN	NL	UK
DC4	Released: October 27, 2016; Label: Dream Chasers, Maybach, Atlantic; Format: Digital download, streaming	3	2	2	58	10	32	48

== Mixtapes ==
Title	Album details
The Real Me	Released: September 1, 2006; Label: Self-released; Format: Digital download
The Real Me 2	Released: December 1, 2006; Label: Self-released; Format: Digital download
Flamers	Released: August 24, 2008; Label: Self-released; Format: Digital download
Flamers 2: Hottest In Tha City	Released: February 24, 2009; Label: Grand Hustle, 215 Aphillyated; Format: Digital download
Flamers 2.5: The Preview	Released: October 13, 2009; Label: Grand Hustle, 215 Aphillyated; Format: Digital download
Flamers 3: The Wait Is Over	Released: March 12, 2010; Label: Grand Hustle, 215 Aphillyated; Format: CD, digital download
Mr. Philadelphia	Released: August 25, 2010; Label: Grand Hustle; Format: CD, digital download
Dreamchasers	Released: August 11, 2011; Label: Maybach; Format: Digital download
Dreamchasers 2	Released: May 7, 2012; Label: Maybach, Warner Bros; Format: Digital download
Dreamchasers 3	Released: September 29, 2013; Label: Maybach, Dream Chasers; Format: Digital download
Flamers 5	Released: November 21, 2022; Label: Maybach, Dream Chasers; Format: Digital download

== Extended plays ==
List of extended plays, with selected chart positions
Title	Details	Peak chart positions			
Title	Details	US	US R&B/ HH	US Rap	CAN
4/4	Released: January 16, 2016; Label: Maybach, Dream Chasers; Formats: Digital download	—	—	—	—
4/4 Part 2	Released: January 30, 2016; Label: Maybach, Dream Chasers; Formats: Digital download	—	—	—	—
Meekend Music	Released: May 6, 2017; Label: Maybach, Dream Chasers, Atlantic; Formats: Digital download	—	—	—	—
Meekend Music 2	Released: July 4, 2017; Label: Maybach, Dream Chasers, Atlantic; Formats: Digital download	—	—	—	—
Legends of the Summer	Released: July 6, 2018; Label: Maybach, Atlantic; Formats: Digital download	9	8	8	37
Quarantine Pack	Released: November 20, 2020; Label: Maybach, Atlantic; Formats: Digital download, streaming	44	22	20	—
Heathenism	Released: February 29, 2024; Label: Dream Chasers; Formats: Digital download, streaming	154	—	—	—
"—" denotes a recording that did not chart or was not released in that territory.

== Singles ==
=== As lead artist ===
List of singles, with selected chart positions, showing year released and album name
Title	Year	Peak chart positions										Certifications	Album
Title	Year	US	US R&B/HH	US Rap	AUS	CAN	FRA	IRE	NZ	SWE	UK	Certifications	Album
"Tupac Back" (featuring Rick Ross)	2011	—	31	22	—	—	—	—	—	—	—		Self Made Vol. 1
"Ima Boss" (featuring Rick Ross)	2011	51	20	17	—	—	—	—	—	—	—	RIAA: Platinum	Self Made Vol. 1
"House Party" (featuring Young Chris)	2011	—	45	24	—	—	—	—	—	—	—	RIAA: Gold	Dreamchasers
"Amen" (featuring Drake)	2012	57	5	4	—	—	—	—	—	—	—	RIAA: Gold	Dreams and Nightmares
"Burn" (featuring Big Sean)	2012	— (Note: "Burn" did not enter the Billboard Hot 100, but peaked at number one on the Bubbling Under Hot 100 chart.)	86	—	—	—	—	—	—	—	—	RIAA: Gold	Dreams and Nightmares
"Young & Gettin' It" (featuring Kirko Bangz)	2012	86	25	18	—	—	—	—	—	—	—	RIAA: Gold	Dreams and Nightmares
"Believe It" (featuring Rick Ross)	2013	— (Note: "Believe It" did not enter the Billboard Hot 100, but peaked at number 22 on the Bubbling Under Hot 100 chart.)	38	—	—	—	—	—	—	—	—		Dreams and Nightmares
"Levels"	2013	— (Note: "Levels" did not enter the Billboard Hot 100, but peaked at number 15 on the Bubbling Under Hot 100 chart.)	43	—	—	—	—	—	—	—	—	RIAA: Gold	Self Made Vol. 3
"I Don't Know" (featuring Paloma Ford)	2014	— (Note: "I Don't Know" did not enter the Billboard Hot 100, but peaked at number 16 on the Bubbling Under Hot 100 chart.)	35	22	—	—	—	—	—	—	—		Non-album singles
"FYM" (featuring Boosie Badazz)	2014	— (Note: "FYM" did not enter the Billboard Hot 100, but peaked at number 19 on the Bubbling Under Hot 100 chart.)	32	—	—	—	—	—	—	—	—		Non-album singles
"B Boy" (featuring A$AP Ferg and Big Sean)	2015	— (Note: "B Boy" did not enter the Billboard Hot 100, but peaked at number seven on the Bubbling Under Hot 100 chart.)	39	—	—	—	—	—	—	—	—		Non-album singles
"Check"	2015	— (Note: "Check" did not enter the Billboard Hot 100, but peaked at number five on the Bubbling Under Hot 100 chart.)	36	24	—	—	—	—	—	—	—	RIAA: Gold	Dreams Worth More Than Money
"All Eyes on You" (featuring Nicki Minaj and Chris Brown)	2015	21	8	5	51	40	186	76	—	89	55	RIAA: 2× Platinum; BPI: Gold; RMNZ: 2× Platinum	Dreams Worth More Than Money
"R.I.C.O." (featuring Drake)	2015	40	14	9	—	45	—	—	—	—	—	RIAA: 2× Platinum; BPI: Silver; RMNZ: Platinum	Dreams Worth More Than Money
"Make It Work" (with Rick Ross and Wale)	2016	—	—	—	—	—	—	—	—	—	—		Non-album single
"Litty" (featuring Tory Lanez)	2017	49	18	14	—	54	—	—	—	—	—	RIAA: Platinum	DC4
"Whatever You Need" (featuring Chris Brown and Ty Dolla Sign)	2017	51	20	15	—	—	—	—	—	—	—	RIAA: Platinum; RMNZ: Gold	Wins & Losses
"Young Black America" (featuring The-Dream)	2017	—	—	—	—	—	—	—	—	—	—		Wins & Losses
"Stay Woke" (featuring Miguel)	2018	— (Note: "Stay Woke" did not enter the Billboard Hot 100, but peaked at number three on the Bubbling Under Hot 100 chart.)	— (Note: "Stay Woke" did not enter the Hot R&B/Hip-Hop Songs chart, but peaked at number one on the Bubbling Under R&B/Hip-Hop Singles chart.)	—	—	—	—	—	—	—	—		Legends of the Summer
"Dangerous" (featuring Jeremih and PnB Rock)	2018	31	18	17	—	—	—	—	—	—	—	RIAA: Platinum; RMNZ: Platinum	Legends of the Summer and Championships
"Going Bad" (featuring Drake)	2019	6	2	2	32	3	126	19	30	60	13	RIAA: 5× Platinum; ARIA: 2× Platinum; BPI: 2× Platinum; MC: 5× Platinum; RMNZ: 3× Platinum	Championships
"24/7" (featuring Ella Mai)	2019	54	25	24	—	—	—	—	—	—	66	RIAA: Platinum; BPI: Silver; RMNZ: Gold	Championships
"Letter to Nipsey" (featuring Roddy Ricch)	2020	73	34	—	—	—	—	—	—	—	—		Non-album singles
"Believe" (featuring Justin Timberlake)	2020	90	42	—	—	—	—	—	—	—	—		Non-album singles
"Otherside of America"	2020	64	27	22	—	100	—	—	—	—	—		Non-album singles
"Pain Away" (featuring Lil Durk)	2020	86	28	25	—	—	—	—	—	—	—		Quarantine Pack
"That Go!" (with YSL Records and Young Thug featuring T Shyne)	2021	— (Note: "That Go!" did not enter the Billboard Hot 100, but peaked at number nine on the Bubbling Under Hot 100 chart.)	43	—	—	—	—	—	—	—	—		Slime Language 2 and Confetti Nights
"Flamerz Flow"	2021	— (Note: "Flamerz Flow" did not enter the Billboard Hot 100, but peaked at number 17 on the Bubbling Under Hot 100 chart.)	—	—	—	—	—	—	—	—	—		Expensive Pain
"Sharing Locations" (featuring Lil Baby and Lil Durk)	2021	22	7	5	—	36	—	—	—	—	92		Expensive Pain
"Blue Notes 2" (featuring Lil Uzi Vert)	2021	72	29	23	—	—	—	—	—	—	—		Expensive Pain
"Shaq & Kobe" (with Rick Ross)	2023	83	29	23	—	—	—	—	—	—	—		Too Good to Be True
"Giving Chanel" (featuring Future)	2024	— (Note: "Giving Chanel" did not enter the Billboard Hot 100, but peaked at number 11 on the Bubbling Under Hot 100 chart.)	42	—	—	—	—	—	—	—	—		Heathenism
"Survivor's Guilt" (with G Herbo)	2025	—	31	22	—	—	—	—	—	—	—		Non-album singles
"Nightmares to Dreams"	2026	82	17	12	—	—	—	—	—	—	—		Non-album singles
"—" denotes releases that did not chart or were not released in that territory.

=== As featured artist ===
List of singles as featured artist, with selected chart positions, showing year released and album name
Title	Year	Peak chart positions							Certifications	Album
Title	Year	US	US R&B/HH	US Rap	FRA	SPA	UK	UK R&B	Certifications	Album
"Scared Money" (N.O.R.E. featuring Pusha T and Meek Mill)	2011	—	—	—	—	—	—	—		Scared Money - EP
"Bag of Money" (Wale featuring Meek Mill, Rick Ross and T-Pain)	2012	64	2	3	—	—	—	—		Self Made Vol. 2
"Party Girl" (Asher Roth featuring Meek Mill)	2012	— (Note: "Party Girl" did not enter the Billboard Hot 100, but peaked at number 20 on the Bubbling Under Hot 100 chart.)	—	—	—	—	—	—		Non-album single
"Tell Her Again" (Sterling Simms featuring Meek Mill)	2012	—	62	—	—	—	—	—		11 Missed Calls
"So Sophisticated" (Rick Ross featuring Meek Mill)	2012	— (Note: "So Sophisticated" did not enter the Billboard Hot 100, but peaked at number four on the Bubbling Under Hot 100 chart.)	82	—	—	—	—	—		God Forgives, I Don't
"My Moment" (DJ Drama featuring 2 Chainz, Meek Mill and Jeremih)	2012	89	23	16	—	—	—	—		Quality Street Music
"Slow Down" (Torch featuring Meek Mill, Gunplay, Wale, Young Breed and Stalley)	2012	—	—	—	—	—	—	—		U.F.O Vol 2
"Triumphant (Get 'Em)" (Mariah Carey featuring Rick Ross and Meek Mill)	2012	— (Note: "Triumphant (Get 'Em)" did not enter the Billboard Hot 100, but peaked at number 15 on the Bubbling Under Hot 100 chart.)	46	—	135	36	144	29		Non-album single
"Bad Ass" (Kid Ink featuring Wale and Meek Mill)	2013	90	27	—	—	—	—	—		Almost Home
"Pay Me" (Sadek featuring Meek Mill)	2013	—	—	—	—	—	—	—		Les Frontières du Réel
"Fly Rich" (Rich Gang featuring Stevie J., Future, Tyga, Meek Mill and Mystikal)	2013	—	— (Note: "Fly Rich" did not enter the Hot R&B/Hip-Hop Songs chart, but peaked at number ten on the Bubbling Under R&B/Hip-Hop Singles chart.)	—	—	—	—	—		Rich Gang
"Bad Girl Takeover" (Just Ivy featuring DJ Khaled and Meek Mill)	2013	—	—	—	—	—	—	—		Non-album single
"They Don't Love You No More" (DJ Khaled featuring Jay-Z, Rick Ross, Meek Mill and French Montana)	2014	— (Note: "They Don't Love You No More" did not enter the Billboard Hot 100, but peaked at number five on the Bubbling Under Hot 100 Singles chart.)	30	17	—	—	—	—		I Changed a Lot
"Dumb" (Jazmine Sullivan featuring Meek Mill)	2014	—	48	—	—	—	—	—		Reality Show
"I Want the Love" (Puff Daddy featuring Meek Mill)	2014	—	—	—	—	—	—	—		Non-album single
"The Soundtrack" (The Game featuring Meek Mill)	2015	—	—	—	—	—	—	—		The Documentary 2 / 2.5 (Collector's Edition)
"Beef" (Tee Grizzley featuring Meek Mill)	2017	—	— (Note: "Beef" did not enter the Billboard Hot R&B/Hip-Hop Songs chart, but peaked at number seven on the Bubbling Under R&B/Hip-Hop Singles chart.)	—	—	—	—	—		Non-album single
"Jefe" (T.I. featuring Meek Mill)	2018	—	—	—	—	—	—	—		Dime Trap
"Tap" (Nav featuring Meek Mill)	2019	87	36	—	—	—	—	—	RIAA: 2× Platinum; MC: 2× Platinum	Bad Habits
"100 Bands" (Mustard featuring Quavo, 21 Savage, YG and Meek Mill)	2019	— (Note: "100 Bands" did not enter the Billboard Hot 100, but peaked at number 25 on the Bubbling Under Hot 100 chart.)	—	—	—	—	—	—	RIAA: Gold	Perfect Ten
"You Stay" (DJ Khaled featuring Meek Mill, J Balvin, Lil Baby and Jeremih)	2019	44	19	—	—	—	—	—	RIAA: Platinum	Father of Asahd
"Backwards" (Gucci Mane featuring Meek Mill)	2019	—	—	—	—	—	—	—		Delusions of Grandeur
"100 Shooters" (Future featuring Meek Mill and Doe Boy)	2019	— (Note: "100 Shooters" did not enter the Billboard Hot 100, but peaked at number one on the Bubbling Under Hot 100 chart.)	39	—	—	—	—	—	RIAA: Gold	High Off Life
"Thot Box" (Hitmaka featuring Meek Mill, 2 Chainz, Tyga, A Boogie Wit Da Hoodie and YBN Nahmir)	2019	—	—	—	—	—	—	—		Big Tuh
"—" denotes a recording that did not chart or was not released in that territory.

=== Promotional singles ===
List of promotional singles, with selected chart positions, showing year released and album name
Title	Year	Peak chart positions				Certifications	Album
Title	Year	US	US R&B/HH	US Rap	CAN	Certifications	Album
"Believe Me" (featuring Dave Patten)	2011	—	—	—	—		Non-album singles
"Ima Boss" (Remix) (featuring DJ Khaled, T.I., Rick Ross, Lil Wayne, Birdman and Swizz Beatz)	2011	51	—	—	—		Non-album singles
"Wild Boy" (Remix) (MGK featuring Steve-O, 2 Chainz, Meek Mill, Mystikal, French Montana and Yo Gotti)	2012	—	—	—	—		Non-album singles
"Dreams and Nightmares"	2012	—	— (Note: "Dreams and Nightmares" did not enter the Hot R&B/Hip-Hop Songs chart, but peaked at number one on the Bubbling Under R&B/Hip-Hop Singles chart.)	—	—	RIAA: 2× Platinum; RMNZ: Gold	Dreams and Nightmares
"My Nigga" (Remix) (YG featuring Lil Wayne, Rich Homie Quan, Meek Mill and Nicki Minaj)	2014	—	—	—	—		My Krazy Life
"Off the Corner" (featuring Rick Ross)	2014	—	— (Note: "Off the Corner" did not enter the Hot R&B/Hip-Hop Songs chart, but peaked at number five on the Bubbling Under R&B/Hip-Hop Singles chart.)	—	—		Non-album singles
"Monster"	2015	96	30	19	—	RIAA: Gold	Non-album singles
"Glow Up"	2017	—	— (Note: "Glow Up" did not enter the Hot R&B/Hip-Hop Songs chart, but peaked at number eight on the Bubbling Under R&B/Hip-Hop Singles chart.)	—	—		Wins & Losses
"Issues"	2017	77	30	23	—	RIAA: Gold	Wins & Losses
"Drip Drip Drip" (Tory Lanez featuring Meek Mill)	2018	106	50	—	56		Love Me Now?
"Uptown Vibes" (featuring Fabolous and Anuel AA)	2018	39	17	15	73	RIAA: Gold	Championships
"Oodles o' Noodles Babies"	2018	85	49	—	—		Championships
"Conga" (with Leslie Grace and Boi-1da)	2021	—	—	—	—		promotional single for Bacardi
"—" denotes a recording that did not chart or was not released in that territory.

== Other charted and certified songs ==
Title	Year	Peak chart positions								Certifications	Album
Title	Year	US	US R&B/HH	US Rap	AUS	CAN	NZ Hot	UK	WW	Certifications	Album
"Make 'Em Say"	2009	—	94	—	—	—	—	—	—		Flamerz 2.5: The Preview
"Rosé Red"	2010	—	— (Note: "Rosé Red" did not enter the Hot R&B/Hip-Hop Songs chart, but peaked at number three on the Bubbling Under R&B/Hip-Hop Singles chart.)	—	—	—	—	—	—		Flamerz 3: The Wait Is Over
"Play Your Part" (Wale featuring D.A., Meek Mill and Rick Ross)	2011	—	— (Note: "Play Your Part" did not enter the Hot R&B/Hip-Hop Songs chart, but peaked at number 12 on the Bubbling Under R&B/Hip-Hop Singles chart.)	—	—	—	—	—	—		Self Made Vol. 1
"Ambition" (Wale featuring Meek Mill and Rick Ross)	2011	81	—	—	—	—	—	—	—	RIAA: Platinum	Ambition
"I'm Rollin'"	2012	—	— (Note: "I'm Rollin'" did not enter the Hot R&B/Hip-Hop Songs chart, but peaked at number 14 on the Bubbling Under R&B/Hip-Hop Singles chart.)	—	—	—	—	—	—		Dreamchasers 2
"Lean Wit It"	2012	—	— (Note: "Lean Wit It" did not enter the Hot R&B/Hip-Hop Songs chart, but peaked at number 21 on the Bubbling Under R&B/Hip-Hop Singles chart.)	—	—	—	—	—	—		Dreamchasers 2
"Check Me Out" (Trey Songz featuring Diddy and Meek Mill)	2012	—	— (Note: "Check Me Out" did not enter the Hot R&B/Hip-Hop Songs chart, but peaked at number three on the Bubbling Under R&B/Hip-Hop Singles chart.)	—	—	—	—	—	—		Chapter V
"Dreams and Nightmares"	2012	—	— (Note: "Dreams and Nightmares" did not enter the Hot R&B/Hip-Hop Songs chart, but peaked at number one on the Bubbling Under R&B/Hip-Hop Singles chart.)	—	—	—	—	—	—	RIAA: 2× Platinum	Dreams and Nightmares
"Lay Up" (Meek Mill featuring Wale, Rick Ross and Trey Songz)	2012	—	— (Note: "Lay Up" did not enter the Hot R&B/Hip-Hop Songs chart, but peaked at number two on the Bubbling Under R&B/Hip-Hop Singles chart.)	—	—	—	—	—	—		Dreams and Nightmares
"G Season" (T.I. featuring Meek Mill)	2012	— (Note: "G Season" did not enter the Billboard Hot 100, but peaked at number 22 on the Bubbling Under Hot 100 chart.)	41	—	—	—	—	—	—		Trouble Man: Heavy Is the Head
"Mula" (Remix) (Big Sean featuring 2 Chainz, Meek Mill and Earlly Mac)	2013	—	— (Note: "Mula" (Remix) did not enter the Hot R&B/Hip-Hop Songs chart, but peaked at number four on the Bubbling Under R&B/Hip-Hop Singles chart.)	—	—	—	—	—	—		Hall of Fame
"F-U" (Yo Gotti featuring Meek Mill)	2014	—	— (Note: "F-U" did not enter the Hot R&B/Hip-Hop Songs chart, but peaked at number seven on the Bubbling Under R&B/Hip-Hop Singles chart.)	—	—	—	—	—	—		I Am
"Buy a Heart" (Nicki Minaj featuring Meek Mill)	2014	—	48	—	—	—	—	—	—		The Pinkprint
"Big Daddy" (Nicki Minaj featuring Meek Mill)	2014	—	— (Note: "Big Daddy" did not enter the Hot R&B/Hip-Hop Songs chart, but peaked at number two on the Bubbling Under R&B/Hip-Hop Singles chart.)	—	—	—	—	—	—		The Pinkprint
"Lord Knows" (featuring Tory Lanez)	2015	88	27	22	—	—	—	—	—	RIAA: Gold	Dreams Worth More Than Money
"Classic" (featuring Swizz Beatz and Jeremih)	2015	—	— (Note: "Classic" did not enter the Hot R&B/Hip-Hop Songs chart, but peaked at number one on the Bubbling Under R&B/Hip-Hop Singles chart.)	—	—	—	—	—	—		Dreams Worth More Than Money
"Jump Out the Face" (featuring Future)	2015	91	28	23	—	—	—	—	—	RIAA: Gold	Dreams Worth More Than Money
"The Trillest"	2015	—	— (Note: "The Trillest" did not enter the Hot R&B/Hip-Hop Songs chart, but peaked at number three on the Bubbling Under R&B/Hip-Hop Singles chart.)	—	—	—	—	—	—		Dreams Worth More Than Money
"I Got the Juice"	2015	— (Note: "I Got the Juice" did not enter the Billboard Hot 100, but peaked at number 18 on the Bubbling Under Hot 100 chart.)	— (Note: "I Got the Juice" did not enter the Hot R&B/Hip-Hop Songs chart, but peaked at number two on the Bubbling Under R&B/Hip-Hop Singles chart.)	—	—	—	—	—	—		Dreams Worth More Than Money
"Ambitionz"	2015	—	— (Note: "Ambitionz" did not enter the Hot R&B/Hip-Hop Songs chart, but peaked at number six on the Bubbling Under R&B/Hip-Hop Singles chart.)	—	—	—	—	—	—		Dreams Worth More Than Money
"Pullin' Up" (featuring The Weeknd)	2015	— (Note: "Pullin' Up" did not enter the Billboard Hot 100, but peaked at number one on the Bubbling Under Hot 100 chart.)	31	25	—	—	—	—	—		Dreams Worth More Than Money
"Been That" (featuring Rick Ross)	2015	—	— (Note: "Been That" did not enter the Hot R&B/Hip-Hop Songs chart, but peaked at number two on the Bubbling Under R&B/Hip-Hop Singles chart.)	—	—	—	—	—	—		Dreams Worth More Than Money
"Bad for You" (featuring Nicki Minaj)	2015	78	23	19	—	—	—	—	—	RIAA: Gold	Dreams Worth More Than Money
"Cold Hearted" (featuring Diddy)	2015	—	— (Note: "Cold Hearted" did not enter the Hot R&B/Hip-Hop Songs chart, but peaked at number ten on the Bubbling Under R&B/Hip-Hop Singles chart.)	—	—	—	—	—	—		Dreams Worth More Than Money
"On the Regular"	2016	75	33	25	—	—	—	—	—		DC4
"Blessed Up"	2016	97	41	—	—	—	—	—	—		DC4
"Shine"	2016	— (Note: "Shine" did not enter the Billboard Hot 100, but peaked at number two on the Bubbling Under Hot 100 chart.)	46	—	—	—	—	—	—		DC4
"Froze" (featuring Lil Uzi Vert and Nicki Minaj)	2016	68	28	21	—	94	—	—	—		DC4
"The Difference" (featuring Quavo)	2016	84	35	—	—	—	—	—	—		DC4
"Lights Out" (featuring Don Q)	2016	— (Note: "Lights Out" did not enter the Billboard Hot 100, but peaked at number seven on the Bubbling Under Hot 100 chart.)	— (Note: "Lights Out" did not enter the Hot R&B/Hip-Hop Songs chart, but peaked at number one on the Bubbling Under R&B/Hip-Hop Singles chart.)	—	—	—	—	—	—		DC4
"Blue Notes"	2016	93	38	—	—	—	—	—	—	RMNZ: Gold	DC4
"Offended" (featuring Young Thug and 21 Savage)	2016	70	29	22	—	100	—	—	—		DC4
"You Know" (featuring YFN Lucci)	2016	— (Note: "You Know" did not enter the Billboard Hot 100, but peaked at number nine on the Bubbling Under Hot 100 chart.)	— (Note: "You Know" did not enter the Hot R&B/Hip-Hop Songs chart, but peaked at number three on the Bubbling Under R&B/Hip-Hop Singles chart.)	—	—	—	—	—	—		DC4
"Tony Story 3"	2016	— (Note: "Tony Story 3" did not enter the Billboard Hot 100, but peaked at number 12 on the Bubbling Under Hot 100 chart.)	— (Note: "Tony Story 3" did not enter the Hot R&B/Hip-Hop Songs chart, but peaked at number four on the Bubbling Under R&B/Hip-Hop Singles chart.)	—	—	—	—	—	—		DC4
"Outro" (featuring Lil Snupe and French Montana)	2016	— (Note: "Outro" did not enter the Billboard Hot 100, but peaked at number four on the Bubbling Under Hot 100 chart.)	49	—	—	—	—	—	—		DC4
"Wins & Losses"	2017	79	32	24	—	—	—	—	—		Wins & Losses
"1942 Flows"	2017	83	35	25	—	—	—	—	—	RIAA: Platinum	Wins & Losses
"We Ball" (featuring Young Thug)	2017	96	39	—	—	—	—	—	—	RIAA: Gold	Wins & Losses
"Fuck That Check Up" (featuring Lil Uzi Vert)	2017	97	40	—	—	—	—	—	—		Wins & Losses
"Heavy Heart"	2017	99	42	—	—	—	—	—	—		Wins & Losses
"Fall Thru"	2017	— (Note: "Fall Thru" did not enter the Billboard Hot 100, but peaked at number 20 on the Bubbling Under Hot 100 chart.)	— (Note: "Fall Thru" did not enter the Hot R&B/Hip-Hop Songs chart, but peaked at number three on the Bubbling Under R&B/Hip-Hop Singles chart.)	—	—	—	—	—	—	RIAA: Gold	Wins & Losses
"These Scars" (featuring Future and Guordan Banks)	2017	—	— (Note: "These Scars" did not enter the Hot R&B/Hip-Hop Songs chart, but peaked at number five on the Bubbling Under R&B/Hip-Hop Singles chart.)	—	—	—	—	—	—		Wins & Losses
"Connect the Dots" (featuring Yo Gotti and Rick Ross)	2017	— (Note: "Connect the Dots" did not enter the Billboard Hot 100, but peaked at number 25 on the Bubbling Under Hot 100 chart.)	— (Note: "Connect the Dots" did not enter the Hot R&B/Hip-Hop Songs chart, but peaked at number six on the Bubbling Under R&B/Hip-Hop Singles chart.)	—	—	—	—	—	—		Wins & Losses
"Ball Player" (featuring Quavo)	2017	—	— (Note: "Ball Player" did not enter the Hot R&B/Hip-Hop Songs chart, but peaked at number seven on the Bubbling Under R&B/Hip-Hop Singles chart.)	—	—	—	—	—	—		Wins & Losses
"That's My Nigga" (with YG And Snoop Dogg)	2017	—	—	—	—	—	—	—	—	RMNZ: Platinum	Bright: The Album
"Millidelphia" (featuring Swizz Beatz)	2018	72	40	—	—	—	—	—	—		Legends of the Summer
"1AM"	2018	— (Note: "1AM" did not enter the Billboard Hot 100, but peaked at number 22 on the Bubbling Under Hot 100 chart.)	— (Note: "1AM" did not enter the Hot R&B/Hip-Hop Songs chart, but peaked at number 10 on the Bubbling Under R&B/Hip-Hop Singles chart.)	—	—	—	—	—	—		Legends of the Summer
"Intro"	2018	55	26	25	—	—	—	—	—	RIAA: Gold	Championships
"Trauma"	2018	61	30	—	—	—	—	—	—		Championships
"On Me" (featuring Cardi B)	2018	30	13	12	—	97	31	—	—	RIAA: Gold	Championships
"What's Free" (featuring Rick Ross and Jay-Z)	2018	20	10	10	—	66	25	55	—	RIAA: Gold	Championships
"Respect the Game"	2018	57	27	—	—	—	—	—	—	RIAA: Gold	Championships
"Splash Warning" (featuring Future, Roddy Ricch and Young Thug)	2018	77	42	—	—	—	—	—	—		Championships
"Championships"	2018	70	36	—	—	—	—	—	—		Championships
"Almost Slipped"	2018	73	38	—	—	—	—	—	—		Championships
"Tic Tac Toe" (featuring Kodak Black)	2018	72	37	—	—	—	—	—	—		Championships
"Pay You Back" (featuring 21 Savage)	2018	78	43	—	—	—	—	—	—		Championships
"Time" (Lil Baby featuring Meek Mill)	2018	62	31	—	—	—	—	—	—	RIAA: Gold	Street Gossip
"Weather the Storm" (DJ Khaled featuring Meek Mill and Lil Baby)	2019	91	44	—	—	—	—	—	—		Father of Asahd
"Chariot" (Calboy featuring Meek Mill, Lil Durk and Young Thug)	2019	—	— (Note: "Chariot" did not enter the Hot R&B/Hip-Hop Songs chart, but peaked at number two on the Bubbling Under R&B/Hip-Hop Singles chart.)	—	—	—	—	—	—	RIAA: Gold	Wildboy
"On The Road" (Post Malone featuring Meek Mill and Lil Baby)	2019	22	13	11	35	22	—	—	—	RIAA: Platinum; ARIA: Platinum; BPI: Silver; MC: 2× Platinum; RMNZ: Gold	Hollywood's Bleeding
"Peta" (Roddy Ricch featuring Meek Mill)	2019	72	—	—	—	—	—	—	—	RIAA: Platinum; MC: Gold	Please Excuse Me For Being Antisocial
"I Can Have It All" (DJ Khaled featuring Bryson Tiller, H.E.R., and Meek Mill)	2021	— (Note: "I Can Have It All" did not enter the Billboard Hot 100, but peaked at number 18 on the Bubbling Under Hot 100 chart.)	—	—	—	—	—	—	—		Khaled Khaled
"Still Runnin" (with Lil Baby and Lil Durk)	2021	43	18	—	—	70	—	—	60	RIAA: Gold	The Voice of the Heroes
"Intro (Hate on Me)"	2021	36	10	8	—	66	33	—	56		Expensive Pain
"Outside (100 MPH)"	2021	76	30	24	—	—	—	—	174		Expensive Pain
"On My Soul"	2021	69	27	21	—	—	—	—	153		Expensive Pain
"Expensive Pain"	2021	66	26	20	—	—	—	—	160		Expensive Pain
"Ride for You" (featuring Kehlani)	2021	95	41	—	—	—	—	—	—		Expensive Pain
"Me (FWM)" (featuring ASAP Ferg)	2021	89	38	—	—	—	—	—	—		Expensive Pain
"Hot" (featuring Moneybagg Yo)	2021	60	20	—	—	—	39	—	112		Expensive Pain
"Love Train"	2021	90	39	—	—	—	—	—	—		Expensive Pain
"Northside Southside" (featuring Giggs)	2021	— (Note: "Northside Southside" did not enter the Billboard Hot 100, but peaked at number 18 on the Bubbling Under Hot 100 chart.)	—	—	—	—	—	—	—		Expensive Pain
"We Slide" (featuring Young Thug)	2021	— (Note: "We Slide" did not enter the Billboard Hot 100, but peaked at number one on the Bubbling Under Hot 100 chart.)	46	—	—	—	—	—	—		Expensive Pain
"Tweaking" (featuring Vory)	2021	— (Note: "Tweaking" did not enter the Billboard Hot 100, but peaked at number 22 on the Bubbling Under Hot 100 chart.)	—	—	—	—	—	—	—		Expensive Pain
"Love Money"	2021	— (Note: "Love Money" did not enter the Billboard Hot 100, but peaked at number 24 on the Bubbling Under Hot 100 chart.)	—	—	—	—	—	—	—		Expensive Pain
"Angels (RIP Lil Snupe)"	2021	— (Note: "Angels (RIP Lil Snupe)" did not enter the Billboard Hot 100, but peaked at number 19 on the Bubbling Under Hot 100 chart.)	—	—	—	—	—	—	—		Expensive Pain
"Cold Hearted III"	2021	— (Note: "Cold Hearted III" did not enter the Billboard Hot 100, but peaked at number 12 on the Bubbling Under Hot 100 chart.)	—	—	—	—	—	—	—		Expensive Pain
"Proud of Me" (with Fridayy)	2025	87	26	—	—	—	—	—	—		Some Days I'm Good, Some Days I'm Not
"—" denotes a recording that did not chart or was not released in that territory.

== Guest appearances ==
List of non-single guest appearances, with other performing artists, showing year released and album name
Title	Year	Other artist(s)	Album
"Bullets & Gun Smoke"	2010	Vado	Slime Flu
"Get Money (Throw It Away)"	2010	K. Smith	Streets 2 Hollywood
"Daily On The Block"	2010	B Money, T.I.	Flip All Money (advance)
"Philly S***" (Remix)	2010	Young Chris, Black Thought, Eve	—N/a
"Same Dream"	2011	Ace Hood	Body Bag, Vol. 1
"Future"	2011	DJ Khaled, Ace Hood, Big Sean, Wale, Vado	We the Best Forever
"Lay Low"	2011	DJ Drama, Young Chris, Freeway	Third Power
"Never Mind Love"	2011	Karina Bradley	Madam President
"Body Work"	2011	Pusha T, Juicy J, French Montana	Fear of God II: Let Us Pray
"Ambition"	2011	Wale, Rick Ross	Ambition
"Say It to My Face"	2011	Ludacris	1.21 Gigawatts: Back to the First Time
"Stunt"	2011	2 Chainz	T.R.U. REALigion
"Epic"	2011	B.o.B, Playboy Tre	E.P.I.C. (Every Play Is Crucial)
"Tell That Hoe I Did That"	2011	K. Smith	My Life Your Story
"You Don't Know Bout It"	2011	Fabolous	There Is No Competition 3: Death Comes in 3's
"Drop It"	2011	Bobby V, 2 Chainz	Vitamin V
"Who What When"	2012	T.I.	Fuck da City Up
"Get My Paper Right"	2012	Master P, Bengie B, Miss Chee, Wilson H.W, T.E.C.	—N/a
"Last Breath"	2012	Rick Ross, Birdman	Rich Forever
"MMG the World is Ours"	2012	Rick Ross, Pharrell, Stalley	Rich Forever
"Champion"	2012	Prince Malik, Jim Jones	—N/a
"Let It Fly" (Remix)	2012	Maino, Roscoe Dash, DJ Khaled, Ace Hood, Jim Jones, Wale	I Am Who I Am
"Cream"	2012	Maino, T.I.	I Am Who I Am and The Day After Tomorrow
"Rack City" (Remix)	2012	Tyga, Wale, Fabolous, Young Jeezy, T.I.	—N/a
"I Ain't Lyin'"	2012	Freck Billionaire	Benefit of the Drought
"Take Off"	2012	Gillie da Kid	King of Philly
"I'm a Thug"	2012	YG	4 Hunnid Degreez
"See Ya Lookin'"	2012	A.B.N. Renegadez	Welcome 2 the Streets
"The Drill"	2012	Game, Ace Hood	California Republic
"It's Me Again"	2012	C. Grand	H.Y.P.E. (Hustle Your Product Everyday)
"By the Bar"	2012	Jadakiss, Yung Joc	Consignment
"Let Dem Guns Blam"	2012	Waka Flocka Flame	Triple F Life: Friends, Fans and Family
"Why" (Remix)	2012	Mary J. Blige, Rick Ross, Wale, Stalley	—N/a
"Put Yourself in My Position"	2012	Torch, Gunplay	No A/C
"I'm Winnin'"	2012	Jahlil Beats	Legend Music
"Shout Out to the Real"	2012	DJ Khaled, Ace Hood, Plies	Kiss the Ring
"I Did It for My Dawgz"	2012	DJ Khaled, Rick Ross, French Montana, Jadakiss	Kiss the Ring
"Check Me Out"	2012	Trey Songz, Diddy	Chapter V
"Tell Me That I Can't"	2012	Trae tha Truth	Tha Blackprint
"I Did That"	2012	K. Smith, YG	I Am Santiago
"Never Let Em Stop Me"	2012	K. Smith, Teyana Taylor	I Am Santiago
"Real Niggaz"	2012	Gillie da Kid, Yo Gotti	King of Philly 2
"Suicide"	2012	Hamilton Park	—N/a
"It's Me Again" (Remix)	2012	C. Grand, Cassidy	—N/a
"My Audemars"	2012	DJ Drama, Birdman, Gucci Mane	Quality Street Music
"Get Money Nigga"	2012	Gucci Mane	Trap God
"Right Here" (Remix)	2012	Lil Durk	—N/a
"Zero"	2012	Keyshia Cole	Woman to Woman
"Scared Now"	2012	Game	Jesus Piece
"G Season"	2012	T.I.	Trouble Man: Heavy is the Head
"Exorcism"	2012	Euroz	The Foundation 2
"Pizza Boy"	2012	Chip	London Boy
"It's Going Down"	2013	Ace Hood	Starvation 2
"Soft"	2013	Juelz Santana, Rick Ross, Fabolous	God Will'n
"Paper"	2013	Master P, Alley Boy	Al Capone
"Molly" (Remix)	2013	Boston George, Kirko Bangz	—N/a
"Get Alotta That"	2013	Lil Sns	Son of the Future
"In the Morning" (Remix)	2013	Bridget Kelly	—N/a
"Fly Rich"	2013	Rich Gang, Stevie J, Future, Tyga, Mystikal	Rich Gang: All Stars
"Don't Make Me Do It"	2013	Funkmaster Flex, Vado, DJ Khaled, Ace Hood, French Montana	Who You Mad At? Me or Yourself?
"The Latest"	2013	Funkmaster Flex, J-Doe	Who You Mad At? Me or Yourself?
"Money Over Bitches"	2013	Bow Wow	Greenlight 5
"I Got That"	2013	Kayla Brianna	—N/a
"Nobody"	2013	Lil Snupe	R.N.I.C.
"Super Fuckin Cool"	2013	Louie V Gutta	Worth The Wait
"Coolin"	2013	Louie V Gutta	Worth The Wait
"On Everything"	2013	Louie V Gutta, Lee Mazin	Worth The Wait
"Turn Up"	2013	Cassie	RockaByeBaby
"I'm Good (Terrorist)"	2013	Lil Wayne	—N/a
"Blocka"	2013	French Montana, Young Dro, T.I.	G.D.O.D. (Get Dough or Die)
"Bandz"	2013	Travis Scott	Owl Pharaoh
"Peso"	2013	Machine Gun Kelly, Pusha T	Black Flag
"Mad Fo"	2013	Ludacris, Chris Brown, Swizz Beatz, Pusha T	#IDGAF
"This Shit Is Lit" (Remix)	2013	SBOE	—N/a
"Stackin Up"	2013	Alley Boy	War Cry
"Heaven's Afternoon"	2013	Wale	The Gifted
"Where Are You"	2013	Guordan Banks	I Wanna Sing for Oprah
"Bugatti" (Remix)	2013	Ace Hood, T.I., French Montana, Wiz Khalifa, 2 Chainz, Future, DJ Khaled, Birdman	Trials & Tribulations
"Before The Rollie"	2013	Ace Hood	Trials & Tribulations
"Ass Fat"	2013	Trina	—N/a
"Panamera"	2013	Omelly	—N/a
"Mula" (Remix)	2013	Big Sean, 2 Chainz, Earlly Mac	Hall of Fame
"My Life"	2013	K. Michelle	Rebellious Soul
"Fuck You"	2013	Yo Gotti	Nov 19th: The Mixtape and I Am
"Dis Ain't What U Want" (Remix)	2013	Lil Durk, Rick Ross, French Montana	—N/a
"I Feel Like Pac/I Feel Like Biggie"	2013	DJ Khaled, Diddy, Rick Ross, T.I., Swizz Beatz	Suffering from Success
"You Don't Want These Problems"	2013	DJ Khaled, 2 Chainz, Ace Hood, French Montana, Rick Ross, Big Sean, Timbaland	Suffering from Success
"Never Surrender"	2013	DJ Khaled, Scarface, Jadakiss, Akon, John Legend, Anthony Hamilton	Suffering from Success
"Murcielago (Doors Go Up)"	2013	DJ Khaled, Birdman	Suffering from Success
"Ride wit Me"	2013	Trae tha Truth, T.I.	I Am King
"Good Day"	2013	Tyga, Lil Wayne	Well Done 4
"Foreigners"	2013	Fabolous	The S.O.U.L. Tape 3
"Perfectionist"	2013	The Alchemist, Rick Ross	The Cutting Room Floor 3
"Intro"	2014	French Montana, Chinx Drugz	Coke Boys 4
"Lights Camera Action"	2014	Maino, Troy Ave	K.O.B.
"Walkin' on Air"	2014	Rick Ross	Mastermind
"About a Dolla"	2014	Mike Davis, Keke Palmer	—N/a
"The Life"	2014	Phat Geez	Cut from a Different Cloth 2
"Brand New Choppa"	2014	Travis Scott, T.I., Yung Booke, Dro	G.D.O.D. II
"Right There" (Remix)	2015	August Alsina	—N/a
"Never Before"	2015	Kur	How It Never Was
"Basic Bitch"	2015	DJ Clue, Migos	Banned From CD: Part One
"World's Finest"	2015	Rick Ross	Black Dollar
"Turn Ya Back"	2015	Rick Ross, Gucci Mane, Whole Slab	Black Dollar
"I Lied"	2015	DJ Khaled, French Montana, Jadakiss, Beanie Sigel	I Changed a Lot
"Love Foreal"	2016	Hardo	—N/a
"Black Man"	2016	T.I., Quavo, Ra Ra	Us or Else
"Boyz in the Hood"	2016	DJ Drama, Pusha T, Ty Dolla $ign	—N/a
"Watching"	2016	Ty Dolla Sign	Campaign
"What These Bitches Want"	2016	DJ Mustard, Nipsey Hussle, Ty Dolla $ign	Cold Summer
"Black Moses"	2016	Pusha T, Priscilla Renea	The Birth of a Nation: The Inspired By Album
"Young Niggas"	2016	Lil Durk	They Forgot
"One on One"	2017	Yo Gotti, YFN Lucci	I Still Am
"Immigrant"	2018	Belly, M.I.A.	Immigrant
"Drip Drip Drip"	2018	Tory Lanez	Love Me Now?
"Time"	2018	Lil Baby	Street Gossip
"Weather the Storm"	2019	DJ Khaled, Lil Baby	Father of Asahd
"Heart 2 Heart"	2019	YG, Arin Ray, Rose Gold	4Real 4Real
"Bogus Charms"	2019	Rick Ross	Port of Miami 2
"MLK BLVD"	2019	Jeezy	TM104: The Legend of the Snowman
"Bougie"	2019	Lil Durk	Love Songs 4 the Streets 2
"On the Road"	2019	Post Malone, Lil Baby	Hollywood's Bleeding
"Cruze"	2019	NLE Choppa	Cottonwood (Deluxe)
"8 Figures"	2020	DaBaby	My Brother's Keeper (Long Live G)
"Still Runnin"	2021	Lil Baby, Lil Durk	The Voice of the Heroes
"Talk To Me Nice"	2022	The Game, Moneybagg Yo, Blxst	Drillmatic – Heart vs. Mind

== Music videos ==
=== As lead artist ===
List of music videos, with directors, showing year released
Title	Year	Director(s)
"Tupac Back" (featuring Rick Ross)	2011	Mr. Boomtown
"Ima Boss" (featuring Rick Ross)	2011	Benny Boom
"House Party" (featuring Young Chris)	2011	Dre Films
"Lean Wit It"	2012	Dre Films
"Black Magic" (featuring Rick Ross)	2012	Parris
"Actin' Up" (with Wale featuring French Montana)	2012	Mr. Boomtown
"Amen" (featuring Drake)	2012	Dre Films
"Face Down" (featuring Trey Songz, DJ Sam Sneaker and Wale)	2012	Dre Films
"Burn" (featuring Big Sean)	2012	Dre Films
"Young & Gettin' It" (featuring Kirko Bangz)	2012	Dre Films
"Dreams and Nightmares"	2013	Alex Nazari
"Believe It" (featuring Rick Ross)	2013	Dre Films
"I'm Leanin'" (featuring Travis Scott)	2013	Jon J
"Levels"	2013	Hype Williams
"I B On Dat" (featuring Nicki Minaj, Fabolous and French Montana)	2013	Will Ngo
"All Eyes on You" (featuring Nicki Minaj and Chris Brown)	2015	Benny Boom
"Young Black America" (featuring The Dream)	2017	Spike Jordan
"Glow Up"	2017	Will Ngo
"Fall Thru"	2017	Spike Jordan
"We Ball" (featuring Young Thug)	2017	Will Ngo
"1942 Flows"	2018	Spike Jordan
"Dangerous" (featuring Jeremih and PnB Rock)	2018	The Kid Art
"Intro"	2018	Kid Art
"Trauma"	2018	Will Ngo
"Going Bad"" (featuring Drake)	2019	Kid Art
"Oodles o' Noodles Babies"	2019	Will Ngo
"Believe" (featuring Justin Timberlake)	2020	Maxime Quoilin
"Pain Away" (featuring Lil Durk)	2020	—N/a

=== As featured artist ===
List of music videos, with directors, showing year released
Title	Year	Director(s)
"Ambition" (Wale featuring Rick Ross and Meek Mill)	2012	Dre Films
"Stunt" (2 Chainz featuring Meek Mill)	2012	Alex Nazari
"So Sophisticated" (Rick Ross featuring Meek Mill)	2012	Dre Films
"Triumphant (Get 'Em)" (Mariah Carey featuring Rick Ross and Meek Mill)	2012	Nick Cannon
"My Moment" (DJ Drama featuring 2 Chainz, Meek Mill and Jeremih)	2012	Kareem Johnson
"Slow Down" (Torch featuring Meek Mill, Wale, Gunplay, Stalley and Young Breed)	2012	DNA Videos
"Rush Hour" (L.E.P. Bogus Boys featuring Meek Mill)	2012	Open World Films
"I Did It For My Dawgz" (DJ Khaled featuring Rick Ross, Meek Mill, French Montana, Jadakiss and Ace Hood)	2012	Spiff TV
"It's Going Down" (Ace Hood featuring Meek Mill)	2013	Edgar Esteves
"Bad Ass" (Kid Ink featuring Wale and Meek Mill)	2013	Alex Nazari
"Bad Girl Takeover" (Just Ivy featuring DJ Khaled and Meek Mill)	2013	Dale Resteghini
"Fans Mi" (Davido featuring Meek Mill)	2015	Sesan
"Jefe" (T.I. featuring Meek Mill)	2018	Nathan R. Smith
"Drip Drip Drip" (Tory Lanez featuring Meek Mill)	2018	Tory Lanez and Mid Jordan
