= Make Em Say =

Make Em Say may refer to:

- "Make Em Say", a song by NLE Choppa from the 2020 album Top Shotta
- "Make 'Em Say", a song by Meek Mill from the 2009 mixtape Flamerz 2.5: The Preview

== See also ==
- "Make Her Say", a 2009 song by Kid Cudi
- "Make 'Em Say Uhh!", a 1998 song by Master P
