= Blue Notes 2 =

2021 single by Meek Mill featuring Lil Uzi Vert

Single by Meek Mill featuring Lil Uzi Vert

from the album Expensive Pain
- Released: September 1, 2021
- Length: 3:51
- Label: Maybach Music; Atlantic
- Songwriters: Robert Williams; Symere Woods; Nikolas Papamitrou; Alexander Papamitrou
- Producers: Nick Papz; Xander

Meek Mill singles chronology
| "Sharing Locations" (2021) | "Blue Notes 2" (2021) | "Cartier" (2023) |

Lil Uzi Vert singles chronology
| "From the Garden" (2021) | "Blue Notes 2" (2021) | "V12" (2021) |

Music video
- "Blue Notes 2" on YouTube

"Blue Notes 2" is a song by American rapper Meek Mill, featuring fellow American rapper Lil Uzi Vert. It was released on September 1, 2021, through Atlantic Records and Maybach Music Group, as the third single from Meek Mill's fifth studio album Expensive Pain. The song was produced by Nick Papz and Xander. It is a sequel to Meek's track, "Blue Notes", from his eleventh mixtape, DC4 (2016).

== Background ==
"Blue Notes 2" is a sequel to "Blue Notes", which was released as a part of Meek's eleventh mixtape, DC4 (2016) and samples Snowy White's track, "Midnight Blues". On the guitar-heavy instrumental, Meek is seen "delivering rapid-fire bars" with Uzi on the bridge and the song's fourth and final verse. On July 11, 2021, Meek and Uzi were spotted filming a music video for the song.

== Music video ==
A music video, directed by Meek and Kid Art, was released alongside the song on September 1, 2021. The "high-octane clip" sees Meek and Uzi riding on street bikes and ATVs while being chased by a police helicopter.

== Live performances ==
Meek and Uzi performed the song live the first time on The Tonight Show Starring Jimmy Fallon on September 20, 2021. Before performing, Meek claimed himself as "fresh out of Philadelphia" before performing the song with Uzi on the smoke-covered stage; both rappers are from Philadelphia, Pennsylvania.

== Charts ==
Chart performance for "Blue Notes 2"
| Chart (2021) | Peak position |
|---|---|
| Global 200 (Billboard) | 147 |
| US Billboard Hot 100 | 72 |
| US Hot R&B/Hip-Hop Songs (Billboard) | 29 |
