= We Uh Shoot =

Single by Polo G featuring Lil Durk

from the album Hood Poet
- Released: August 2, 2024
- Length: 2:33
- Label: Columbia
- Songwriters: Allen Ritter; Bryan Lamar Simmons; Joshua Luellen; Durk Banks; Taurus Bartlett; Jermaine Elliott; Isaiah Quick; Javon McGuire; Maximilian McFarlin
- Producers: Southside; TM88; Allen Ritter; MacShooter; Jermaine Elliott; Rozay Knockin; Von88

Polo G singles chronology
"Angels in the Sky" (2024)	"We Uh Shoot" (2024)	"S.I.P" (2024)

"We Uh Shoot" is a song by American rapper Polo G featuring American rapper Lil Durk. It was released on August 2, 2024, as the fourth and final single from his fourth studio album, Hood Poet. The song was produced by Southside, TM88, Rozay Knockin, MacShooter, Allen Ritter, Jermaine Elliott, and Von88.

== Critical reception ==
Quincy of RatingsGameMusic reviewed the song positively, giving "We Uh Shoot" a 4/5 rating and stated: "I love that Polo G and Lil Durk, two poppin’ rappers from Chicago, still have a solid relationship," Quincy then stated that the track first "didn’t quite move me [him]" and that it sounded "outdated". Zachary Horvath of HotNewHipHop say that "We Uh Shoot" is an "aggressive gun-toting track" and praised Lil Durk's performance as a "standout," while saying Polo G's performance "sound[‘s] crisp".

== Lyric video ==
As of November 15, 2024, "We Uh Shoot" doesn't have an official music video but does, however, have an official lyric video that was uploaded to Polo G's YouTube channel on August 2, 2024. The lyric video currently has 45,000 likes and more than one million views on YouTube as of November 2024.

== Chart performance ==
In New Zealand, "We Uh Shoot" performed well, on the chart dated August 9, 2024, the song entered the NZ Hot Singles Chart at number 27.

== Charts ==
Chart performance for "We Uh Shoot"
Chart (2024)	Peak position
New Zealand Hot Singles (RMNZ)	27
