= Hood Poet =

Studio album by Polo G
- Released: August 9, 2024
- Recorded: 2021–2024
- Studio: Lion Share Studios
- Length: 49:54
- Label: Columbia
- Producers: 1HittWonder; Allen Ritter; ALyX; ATL Jacob; Avery on the Beat; Carlton; Cubeatz; Dougie F; Dr. Luke; Dru DeCaro; Fridayy; Hendrix Smoke; Inverness; J3; Jaasu; Jermaine Elliott; Lufye; Luis Bacqué; Macshooter; Minor2Go; Nick Papz; Noah Goldstein; Oz on the Track; Pink Slip; ProdLau; Roza; Rozay Knockin; Ryan Bakalarczyk; Shottie; Smatt Sertified; Snake Child; Southside; Splited Stupid; Thank You Fizzle; TM88; TooDope; Twysted Genius; Wasa; Xander; Zack Bia

Polo G chronology
Hall of Fame 2.0 (2021)	Hood Poet (2024)

Singles from Hood Poet
- 1. "Distraction" Released: June 3, 2022; 2. "Barely Holdin' On" Released: August 18, 2023; 3. "Angels in the Sky" Released: May 31, 2024; 4. "We Uh Shoot" Released: August 2, 2024

Professional ratings
Review scores
Source	Rating
RapReviews	7/10
Slant Magazine	2.5/5 stars

Hood Poet (a backronym for "He Overcame Obstacles During Pain or Emotional Trauma") is the fourth studio album by American rapper Polo G. It was released on August 9, 2024, through Columbia Records. The album features guest appearances from 42 Dugg, Fridayy, Future, GloRilla, G Herbo, Hunxho, Offset, Lil Durk, and The Kid Laroi. The production of the album was primarily handled by Southside, Allen Ritter, and Smatt Sertified, with assistance from ATL Jacob, Cubeatz, Dr. Luke, Dru DeCaro, Fridayy, Nick Papz, Noah Goldstein, Pink Slip, TM88, and Zack Bia, alongside several other producers. The album serves as a follow-up to Bartlett's deluxe album, Hall of Fame 2.0 (2021).

The album was supported by four official singles: "Distraction", "Barely Holdin' On", "Angels in the Sky", and "We Uh Shoot" (with Lil Durk). The album debuted and peaked at 28 on the Billboard 200 with 24k album equivalent units in its first week.

== Release, promotion, and reception ==
Originally, Hood Poet was teased as a collaborative studio album by Polo G and American record producer Southside. In August 2023, Polo G teased the album's release by setting up posters containing lyrics with the album's title Hood Poet under each one. On August 15, 2023, he officially announced the album's release, as well as a single titled "Barely Holdin' On", with the album to release on September 15, 2023, alongside a 24-hour livestream to promote the album. Following the release of "Barely Holdin' On," he announced that he was contemplating retirement from music after he released the album. However, later that month, on August 23, Polo G was arrested alongside his brother in connection to a robbery. During the search of his home, an illegal short-barreled rifle was found, resulting in an additional firearm charge. The arrest resulted in a delay in the release of the album. A tour was also planned, but those dates were never affected by those charges.

In January 2024, Polo G stated in an interview with TMZ that the album would be released in August. On March 24, Polo performed his an unreleased track, "Heavy Heart" on From The Block. On July 30, 2024, he announced that the album would release on August 9, 2024, while also revealing the cover art and guest appearances for the album. On August 6, Polo G released the album's official tracklist.

Following the release of the album, Polo G released the official music video for the album's fourteenth cut, "Darkside".

The album peaked at #28 on Billboard 200 and sold 24,000 units during its first week. It was received negatively by fans and critics alike. As of October 15, 2024, the album has a user score of 51 on Album Of The Year and a 2.4 star rating on Rate Your Music. Slant Magazine gave the album a 2.5 star review, saying that "Polo G shows little interest in pushing himself out of his immediate comfort zone.

=== Singles ===
On May 27, 2022, Polo G announced the first single, "Distraction", with a trailer featuring YouTuber Kai Cenat. "Distraction" was released on June 3, 2022. It charted at number 39 on the Billboard Hot 100. The album's second single, "Barely Holdin' On", was released on August 18, 2023. It peaked at number 68 on the Billboard Hot 100. On May 31, the album's third single, "Angels in the Sky", was released. The album's fourth and final single, "We Uh Shoot" featuring Lil Durk, was released on August 2.

== Track listing ==
Hood Poet track listing
No.	Title	Writer(s)	Producer(s)	Length
1.	"God's Favorite"	Taurus Bartlett; Allen Ritter; Nikolas Papamitrou; Alexander Papamitrou; Kyle Buckley; Charles R. Nelsen; Ryan Bakalarczyk; John Pepper Clark-Bekederemo; Amelia Moore; Jonathan Bach	Allen Ritter; Nick Papz; Xander; Pink Slip; Inverness; Ryan Bakalarczyk	2:12
2.	"No Recruits" (featuring G Herbo)	Bartlett; Herbert Wright III; Joshua Luellen; Ritter; Matthew-Kyle Brown; Maximilian McFarlin; Bailey Lau; Hasan Cankurt	Southside; Ritter; Smatt Sertified; Macshooter; ProdLau	3:02
3.	"Barely Holdin' On"	Bartlett; Luellen; Łukasz Gottwald; Noah Goldstein	Southside; Dr. Luke; Noah Goldstein; Lufye^{[c]}; Shottie^{[c]}; Bryce Bordone^{[a]}; Katie Harvey^{[a]}; Nate Mingo^{[a]}; Noah McCorkle^{[a]}	2:53
4.	"Only Gang" (featuring 42 Dugg)	Bartlett; Dion Hayes; Luellen; Ritter; Brown; Jermaine Cherry	Southside; Ritter; Smatt Sertified; Elliott	3:12
5.	"Same Me" (featuring Fridayy)	Bartlett; Francis Leblanc; Ritter; Cherry; Jaasu Mallory; Zack Bialobos	Fridayy; Ritter; Elliott; Jaasu; Zack Bia	2:43
6.	"Detox"	Bartlett; Luellen; Ritter; Andrew DeCaro; Adam Kobylarz	Southside; Ritter; Dru DeCaro; Snake Child	2:22
7.	"Thorns"	Bartlett; Luellen; Ritter; Ashot Akopian; Lesidney Ragland; Brown	Southside; Ritter; Shottie; TooDope; Lufye^{[c]}	3:05
8.	"G63" (featuring Offset)	Bartlett; Kiari Cephus; Luellen; Ritter; Brown; Murenets Nikita; Alyx; Douglas Ford; Johan Rosa	Southside; Ritter; Smatt Sertified; Splited Stupid; Alyx; Dougie F; Roza	2:46
9.	"We Uh Shoot" (featuring Lil Durk)	Bartlett; Durk Banks; Luellen; Ritter; Bryan Simmons; Maximilian McFarlin; Isaiah Quick	Southside; Ritter; TM88; Macshooter; Rozay Knockin	2:33
10.	"Rain Fallin" (featuring the Kid Laroi)	Bartlett; Charlton Howard; Luellen; Ritter; Brown; Cherry; Giuseppe Vasaturo	Southside; Ritter; Smatt Sertified; Jermaine Elliott; Wasa	3:01
11.	"Distraction"	Bartlett; Luellen; Tim Gomringer; Kevin Gomringer	Southside; Cubeatz	2:51
12.	"No Turning Back" (featuring Hunxho)	Bartlett; Ibrahim Muhammad Dodo; Luellen; Ritter; Brown; Vasaturo	Southside; Ritter; Smatt Sertified; Wasa	3:08
13.	"Angels in the Sky"	Bartlett; Paul Whittaker; Daniel Ivy; 1HittWonder	Oz on the Track; 1HittWonder	2:42
14.	"Darkside"	Bartlett; Luellen; Avery Cockerill; Martin Püschel	Southside; Avery on the Beat; Minor2Go	2:53
15.	"Bad Kids" (featuring GloRilla)	Bartlett; Gloria Woods; Deundraeus Portis	Twysted Genius	2:36
16.	"Survival of the Fittest" (featuring Future)	Bartlett; Nayvadius DeMun Cash; Ritter; Rosa; Jacob Canady; Derrick Miller; Joshua Goldenberg	Ritter; Roza; ATL Jacob; Carlton; Hendrix Smoke; Thank You Fizzle	2:55
17.	"Father's Day"	Bartlett; Luellen; Ritter; Brown; Cherry; T. Gomringer; K. Gomringer; Luis Bacqué	Southside; Ritter; Smatt Sertified; Elliott; Cubeatz; Luis Bacqué	2:42
18.	"From the Heart"	Bartlett; Luellen; Ritter; Brown; T. Gomringer; K. Gomringer	Southside; Ritter; Smatt Sertified; Cubeatz	2:18
Total length:				49:54

Notes

- ^{^[c]} signifies a co-producer
- ^{^[a]} signifies an additional producer

== Personnel ==
Musicians

- Polo G – vocals (all tracks)
- G Herbo – vocals (2)
- 42 Dugg – vocals (4)
- Fridayy – vocals (5)
- Offset – vocals (8)
- Lil Durk – vocals (9)
- The Kid Laroi – vocals (10)
- Hunxho – vocals (12)
- GloRilla – vocals (15)
- Future – vocals (16)

Technical

- Dale Becker – mastering (3)
- Nicolas de Porcel – mastering (9, 13)
- Eric Lagg – mastering (11)
- Jaycen Joshua – mixing (1, 4–8, 10, 15, 16)
- MixedByAli – mixing (2, 9, 12, 13, 14, 17, 18)
- Serban Ghenea – mixing (3)
- Patrizio "Teezio" Pigliapoco – mixing (11)
- Todd Hurtt – mixing (11, 13), recording
- Jordan Michael O'Brien – mixing (13), engineering assistance (3)
- Michael Hernandez – mixing (14)
- Josh Villegas – mixing (15)
- Anthony Vega – engineering assistance (1, 18)
- Jesse Navaro – engineering assistance (2, 6, 11)
- Peter Kuhlmann – engineering assistance (4)
- Donovan Fava – engineering assistance (5)
- Walker Riggs – engineering assistance (7, 11, 12)
- Faith Howard-Parra – engineering assistance (8)
- Demitrius Lewis II – engineering assistance (9)
- Graham Polk – engineering assistance (9, 16)
- Ignacio Portales – engineering assistance (11)
- J Shriver – engineering assistance (11)
- Kayla Holland – engineering assistance (13)
- William Frenchman – engineering assistance (17)

== Charts ==
Chart performance for Hood Poet
Chart (2024)	Peak position
Belgian Albums (Ultratop Flanders)	190
Canadian Albums (Billboard)	64
US Billboard 200	28
US Top R&B/Hip-Hop Albums (Billboard)	6

== Release history ==
Release dates and formats for Hood Poet
Region	Date	Label(s)	Format(s)	Edition(s)	Ref.
Various	August 9, 2024	Columbia	Digital download; streaming	Standard	
