= Sharing Locations =

2021 single by Meek Mill featuring Lil Baby and Lil Durk

Single by Meek Mill featuring Lil Baby and Lil Durk

from the album Expensive Pain
- Released: August 27, 2021
- Genre: Trap
- Length: 2:42
- Label: Atlantic; Maybach
- Songwriter(s): Robert Williams; Dominique Jones; Durk Banks; Nikolas Papamitrou; Nii-noi Tetteh; Dominik Svoroboric
- Producer(s): Nick Papz; KJ; Svdominik; Xander

Meek Mill singles chronology
"Flamerz Flow" (2021)	"Sharing Locations" (2021)	"Blue Notes 2" (2021)

Lil Baby singles chronology
"Body in Motion" (2021)	"Sharing Locations" / "Know the Difference" (2021)	"Find a Way" (2021)

Lil Durk singles chronology
"Fast Lane" (2021)	"Sharing Locations" / "Relentless" (2021)	"Find a Way" (2021)

Music video
- "Sharing Locations" on YouTube

"Sharing Locations" is a song by American rapper Meek Mill featuring fellow American rappers Lil Baby and Lil Durk. It was released on August 27, 2021, through Atlantic Records and Maybach Music Group, as the second single from Meek Mill's fifth studio album Expensive Pain. The song was produced by Nick Papz, KJ, Svdominik, and Xander and it contains a sample of "Chichovite Konie" by Filip Kutev's choir. It is the second time that all artists are on the same song, following their joint collaboration, "Still Runnin", which appears on Baby and Durk's collaborative studio album, The Voice of the Heroes (2021).

== Background ==
On January 28, 2021, Meek posted a snippet of the track on Instagram and revealed the involvement of Baby and Durk, while producer Papamitrou posted the same snippet. Video cinematographer Caleb Jermale posted a short clip of the song's accompanying music video. The song was originally thought to be "Bae Shit".

== Critical reception ==
Writing for Vulture, Zoe Haylock stated that Meek, Baby, and Durk "trade bars back and forth like it a high-school parking lot over a Nick Papz, Xander, KJ, and Svdominik production".

== Music video ==
A music video for the song, directed by Meek himself, was released alongside the song on August 27, 2021. It sees Meek, Baby, and Durk hanging out outside of a private jet and rapping.

== Credits and personnel ==
Credits adapted from Tidal.

- Meek Mill – lead vocals, songwriting
- Lil Baby – featured vocals, songwriting
- Lil Durk – featured vocals, songwriting
- Nick Papz – production, songwriting, programming
- KJ – production, songwriting, programming
- Svdominik – production, songwriting, programming
- Xander – production, programming
- 1995 – mixing, recording
- Damn James – mixing
- Jess Jackson – mastering

== Charts ==
=== Weekly charts ===
Weekly chart performance for "Sharing Locations"
Chart (2021)	Peak position
Canada (Canadian Hot 100)	36
Global 200 (Billboard)	42
New Zealand Hot Singles (RMNZ)	18
South Africa (RISA)	53
UK Singles (OCC)	92
US Billboard Hot 100	22
US Hot R&B/Hip-Hop Songs (Billboard)	7
US R&B/Hip-Hop Airplay (Billboard)	15
US Rhythmic (Billboard)	17

=== Year-end charts ===
Year-end chart performance for "Sharing Locations"
Chart (2021)	Position
US Hot R&B/Hip-Hop Songs (Billboard)	74

== Certifications ==
Region	Certification	Certified units/sales
United States (RIAA)	Platinum	1,000,000^{‡}
^{‡} Sales+streaming figures based on certification alone.
