= Barely Holdin' On =

Single by Polo G

from the album Hood Poet
- Released: August 18, 2023
- Length: 2:54
- Label: Columbia
- Songwriters: Noah Goldstein; Łukasz Gottwald; Joshua Luellen; Taurus Bartlett
- Producers: Southside; Dr. Luke; Noah Goldstein

Polo G singles chronology
"Heartbroken" (2023)	"Barely Holdin' On" (2023)	"Sorrys & Ferraris" (2024)

"Barely Holdin' On" is a song by American rapper Polo G. It was released on August 18, 2023, as the second single from his fourth studio album, Hood Poet. The song was produced by Southside, Dr. Luke, and Noah Goldstein.

== Background ==
On August 15, 2023, Bartlett officially announced his next album, Hood Poet. He announced the single for release the following Friday, with the album to release on September 15, 2023.

== Composition ==
The song features tranquil guitars and keyboards and a fidgety beat. Throughout the song, Polo raps about his mental-health and gunplay, with lines such as: "Ain't hard to figure him out 'cause all his thoughts was tweeted/ We blew some shots to shut him up, that's why his top was leakin'." In the first verse, Polo G mentions his childhood friend who was shot and killed in a drive-by on September 18, 2014, while in the second verse he raps about his upbringing, in which he raps about his heavy trauma.

== Critical reception ==
Alexander Cole of HotNewHipHop called the track "an uplifting yet emotional song that speaks to some of the trauma Polo G has faced throughout his life." Vibe said that the song "soundtracks the visual, but paints a picture of the artist attempting to rationalize his own trauma, as well."

== Music video ==
Polo G released the song's music video on August 18, 2023. It was directed by Araad and shows scenes of Polo G at a piano as well as with living individuals who each go through their own struggles.

== Credits and personnel ==
Technical

- Randy Merrill – mastering engineer
- Serban Ghenea – mixing engineer
- Todd Hurtt – recording engineer

== Charts ==
Chart performance for "Barely Holdin' On"
Chart (2023)	Peak position
Canada Hot 100 (Billboard)	93
New Zealand Hot Singles (RMNZ)	4
US Billboard Hot 100	68
US Hot R&B/Hip-Hop Songs (Billboard)	23

== Certifications ==
Certifications for "Barely Holdin' On"
Region	Certification	Certified units/sales
United States (RIAA)	Gold	500,000^{‡}
^{‡} Sales+streaming figures based on certification alone.
