= Believe (Meek Mill song) =

2020 single by Meek Mill featuring Justin Timberlake

Single by Meek Mill featuring Justin Timberlake
- Released: February 7, 2020
- Genre: Hip hop; pop-rap
- Length: 3:31
- Label: Atlantic; Maybach
- Songwriters: Robert Williams; Justin Timberlake; Robin Tadross; Ben Johnson
- Producers: Rob Knox; Justin Timberlake

Meek Mill singles chronology
"Letter to Nipsey" (2020)	"Believe" (2020)	"Otherside of America" (2020)

Justin Timberlake singles chronology
"SoulMate" (2018)	"Believe" (2020)	"The Other Side" (2020)

"Believe" is a song by American rapper Meek Mill featuring American singer Justin Timberlake. It was released for digital download and streaming on February 7, 2020, through Atlantic.

== Background ==
Meek Mill teased the song on social media on February 5, 2020. He then posted the cover of the song the next day and revealed the release date. He posted the making of the song and sneak peek clips of the music video. Justin Timberlake posted only the making of the song and a picture with Meek Mill and a camera pointing at them. It was released with a music video directed by Maxime Quoilin on February 7, 2020. The music video on YouTube has received over 15 million views as of April 2024.

== Release and promotion ==
On February 7, 2020, "Believe" was released for digital download and streaming through Meek Mill's label Atlantic.

== Credits and personnel ==
Credits are adapted from Tidal.

- Meek Mill – lead vocals, songwriting
- Justin Timberlake – featured vocals, songwriting, production
- Rob Knox – songwriting, production
- Benjamin Johnson – songwriting

== Charts ==
Chart (2020)	Peak position
New Zealand Hot Singles (RMNZ)	29
US Billboard Hot 100	90
US Hot R&B/Hip-Hop Songs (Billboard)	42
US Rolling Stone Top 100	38

== Release history ==
Region	Date	Format	Label	Ref.
Various	February 7, 2020	Digital download; streaming	Atlantic	
