= Sorrys & Ferraris =

2024 single by Polo G

Single by Polo G
- Released: February 16, 2024
- Length: 2:47
- Label: Columbia
- Songwriters: Taurus Bartlett; Nikolas Papamitrou; Alexander Papamitrou; Allen Ritter
- Producers: Nick Papz; Xander; Ritter; Caseyprod

Polo G singles chronology
"Barely Holdin' On" (2023)	"Sorrys & Ferraris" (2024)	"Angels in the Sky" (2024)

Music video
- "Sorrys & Ferraris" on YouTube

"Sorrys & Ferraris" is a song by American rapper Polo G, released on February 16, 2024. It was produced by Nick Papz, Xander, Caseyprod and Allen Ritter.

== Content ==
The song revolves around a rags to riches journey of Polo G. He reflects on when he "used to chase a bag on that curb" and says his "life is like a party now".

== Critical reception ==
Tallie Spencer of HotNewHipHop gave a positive review, writing the song "exhibits Polo G's prowess as a storyteller and lyricist, delivering a strong and impactful narrative."

== Music video ==
The music video was directed by Arrad and released alongside the single. It shows Polo G in a garage full of bright red Ferraris and hanging out with his crew in different locations. The clip also has scenes of the Ferraris racing down a road, as well as Polo G enjoying his luxurious life in a private jet, birthday party, beach and other places.

== Charts ==
Chart performance for "Sorrys & Ferraris"
Chart (2024)	Peak position
New Zealand Hot Singles (RMNZ)	20
US Bubbling Under Hot 100 (Billboard)	9
US Hot R&B/Hip-Hop Songs (Billboard)	49
US Rhythmic Airplay (Billboard)	34
