= Distraction (Polo G song) =

2022 single by Polo G

Single by Polo G

from the album Hood Poet
- Released: June 3, 2022
- Genre: Trap
- Length: 2:51
- Label: Columbia
- Songwriters: Taurus Bartlett; Joshua Luellen; Tim Gomringer; Kevin Gomringer; James Jackson Jarves
- Producers: Southside; Cubeatz; J3

Polo G singles chronology
"Waddup" (2022)	"Distraction" (2022)	"Invite Only" (2022)

Music video
- "Distraction" on YouTube

"Distraction" is a song by American rapper Polo G. It was released as a single through Columbia Records on June 3, 2022. Polo wrote the song with producer Southside and co-producers Cubeatz (Tim and Kevin Gomringer) and J3 (James Jackson Jarves). "Distraction" marks Polo's first official single since Hall of Fame 2.0 (2021), which serves as the deluxe edition of his third studio album, Hall of Fame (2021). Polo announced the song on May 26, 2022, alongside a trailer video. It was later featured as the lead single of his fourth studio album Hood Poet (2024).

== Credits and personnel ==
- Polo G – vocals, songwriting
- Southside – production, songwriting
- Cubeatz
  - Tim Gomringer – co-production, songwriting
  - Kevin Gomringer – co-production, songwriting
- J3 – co-production, songwriting
- Todd Hurtt – mixing, recording
- Patrizio Pigliapoco – mixing
- Eric Lagg – mastering
- Ignacio Portales – engineering assistance
- J Shriver – engineering assistance
- Jesse Navarro – engineering assistance
- Walker Riggs – engineering assistance

== Charts ==
Chart performance for "Distraction"
Chart (2022)	Peak position
Canada Hot 100 (Billboard)	31
Global 200 (Billboard)	66
Ireland (IRMA)	70
New Zealand Hot Singles (RMNZ)	7
Sweden Heatseeker (Sverigetopplistan)	19
UK Singles (Official Charts)	61
UK Hip Hop/R&B (Official Charts)	25
US Billboard Hot 100	39
US Hot R&B/Hip-Hop Songs (Billboard)	7

== Certifications ==
Certifications for "Distraction"
Region	Certification	Certified units/sales
Canada (Music Canada)	Gold	40,000^{‡}
United States (RIAA)	Gold	500,000^{‡}
^{‡} Sales+streaming figures based on certification alone.
