= Expensive Pain =

Studio album by Meek Mill
- Released: October 1, 2021
- Length: 55:04
- Label: Maybach; Atlantic
- Producer: 30 Roc; Amore; AT; Austin Powerz; Bkorn; Boi-1da; Brent Faiyaz; Datboi Squeeze; Dato; Rick Ross; Dougie; DZL; darko; Vianey OJ; Emkay; Fuse808; Gebrelul; JJ; KJ; L3gion; Nick Papz; Paperboy Fabe; Sav; Sevn Thomas; Svdominik; Tay Keith; Vinylz; Xander; Yex

Meek Mill chronology
Quarantine Pack (2020)	Expensive Pain (2021)	Too Good to Be True (2023)

Singles from Expensive Pain
- 1. "Flamerz Flow" Released: June 3, 2021; 2. "Sharing Locations" Released: August 27, 2021; 3. "Blue Notes 2" Released: September 1, 2021

Expensive Pain is the fifth studio album by American rapper Meek Mill. It was released on October 1, 2021, through Atlantic Records And Maybach Music Group. The production on the album was handled by multiple producers including Boi-1da, Tay Keith, Vinylz, 30 Roc, Cardo and Sevn Thomas among others. The album also features guest appearances from Lil Baby, Lil Durk, Kehlani, ASAP Ferg, Moneybagg Yo, Giggs, Young Thug, Vory, Lil Uzi Vert, and Brent Faiyaz.

Expensive Pain was supported by three singles: "Flamerz Flow", "Sharing Locations" and "Blue Notes 2". The album received generally mixed to positive reviews from music critics, and was a commercial success. It debuted at number three on the US Billboard 200 chart, earning 95,000 album-equivalent units in its first week.

== Release and promotion ==
Meek announced the album, cover art, and release date on September 15, 2021. He revealed the tracklist on September 30, the day before the album was released. The album cover art was made by modern artist Nina Chanel Abney.

=== Singles ===
Three singles preceded the album's release. "Flamerz Flow" is a bonus track, and it was released with a music video on May 31, 2021, to his YouTube channel, being officially released three days later. "Sharing Locations" featuring Lil Baby and Lil Durk was released on August 27 with a video as the second single. Then "Blue Notes 2" featuring Lil Uzi Vert was the third single, released with a video five days later and performed live on The Tonight Show Starring Jimmy Fallon on September 21.

== Critical reception ==
Professional ratings
Aggregate scores
Source	Rating
Metacritic	64/100
Review scores
Source	Rating
AllMusic	3.5/5 stars
Clash	6/10
NME	2/5 stars
Pitchfork	6.8/10
Rolling Stone	3/5 stars

Expensive Pain was met with generally mixed to positive reviews. At Metacritic, which assigns a normalized rating out of 100 to reviews from professional publications, the album received an average score of 64, indicating “generally favorable reviews”, based on six reviews.

A.D. Amorosi of Variety praised Meek's progression with this effort calling "Expensive Pain Mill’s best, most fully rounded recorded effort: an album that finally portrays all sides of the rapper’s rise, fall, struggles and revivals, to say nothing of his skills as a writer and as an aggressive flow-acist." He also praised Mill's braggadocios approach to many of the songs on the project, saying that "Mill comes out with hope and real brio on his side – a confidence that goes way beyond any mere humble-brag or boast."

== Commercial performance ==
Expensive Pain debuted at number three on the US Billboard 200 chart, earning 95,000 album-equivalent units (including 10,000 copies in pure album sales) in its first week. This became Meek Mill's seventh US top-ten debut on the chart. The album also accumulated a total of 110.53 million on-demand streams from the songs on the project. In its second week, the album dropped to number four on the chart, earning an additional 46,000 units.

== Track listing ==
Standard edition
No.	Title	Writer(s)	Length
1.	"Intro (Hate on Me)"	Robert Williams; Ronald LaTour, Jr.; Daveon Jackson; John Julian; Anthony Moody; Nasir Jones	2:55
2.	"Outside (100 MPH)"	R. Williams; LaTour; Trey Davis; Dominik Patrzek	3:19
3.	"On My Soul"	R. Williams; Anthony Cruz; Eduardo Earle; Adi Helic; Billy Holmdahl; John Lucas	2:22
4.	"Sharing Locations" (featuring Lil Baby and Lil Durk)	R. Williams; Dominique Jones; Durk Banks; Nikolas Papamitrou; Nii-noi Tetteh; Dominik Svoroboric	2:41
5.	"Expensive Pain"	R. Williams; Cruz; Julius Herold; Michael Holmes; Vianey Mfuamba	3:34
6.	"Ride for You" (featuring Kehlani)	R. Williams; Kehlani Parrish; Austin Schindler; Nija Charles; Tracy Hale; Joyce Irby; Wirlie Morris; Thabiso Nkhereanye; Savas Oguz	3:02
7.	"Me (FMW)" (featuring ASAP Ferg)	R. Williams; Darold Ferguson, Jr.; Matthew Samuels; Kameron Cole; Jahaan Sweet; Jonathan Smith; Stephanie Martin; Sammie Norris; Todd Shaw	3:00
8.	"Hot" (featuring Moneybagg Yo)	R. Williams; Demario White, Jr.; N. Papamitrou; Tetteh; Alexander Monro	2:31
9.	"Love Train"	R. Williams; Cruz; Simon Gebrelul; Aaron Tesfagiorgis	3:55
10.	"Northside Southside" (featuring Giggs)	R. Williams; Nathaniel Thompson; LaTour; Mark Lapple	3:03
11.	"We Slide" (featuring Young Thug)	R. Williams; Jeffery Williams; Jamichael Benson; Brytavious Chambers	3:31
12.	"Tweaking" (featuring Vory)	R. Williams; Tavoris Hollins, Jr.; Samuels; Maneesh Bidaye; Anderson Hernandez	3:17
13.	"Love Money"	R. Williams; Cruz; Earle; Grant Hewlett; David Weiner	3:02
14.	"Blue Notes 2" (featuring Lil Uzi Vert)	R. Williams; Symere Woods; N. Papamitrou; Alexander Papamitrou	3:50
15.	"Angels (RIP Lil Snupe)"	R. Williams; Douglas Whitehead	3:01
16.	"Cold Hearted III"	R. Williams; Schindler; Brandon Korn; Hunter Powell	2:48
17.	"Halo" (featuring Brent Faiyaz)	R. Williams; Christopher Wood; Schindler; Jason Avalos; Fabbien Nahounou; Rupert Thomas, Jr.	3:32
Total length:			53:23

Bonus track
No.	Title	Writer(s)	Length
18.	"Flamerz Flow"	R. Williams; Samuel Gloade; Adarius Moragne	1:41
Total length:			55:04

Sample credits

- "Intro (Hate on Me)" contains samples of "Hate Me Now", written by Nasir Jones, Sean Combs and Gavin Marchand, as performed by Nas, which itself samples Carmina Burana, composed by Carl Orff.
- "Sharing Locations" contains uncredited samples of the Bulgarian folk song "Чичовите конье".
- "Me (FWM)" contains samples from "Bia' Bia'", written by Jonathan Smith, Todd Shaw, Stephanie Martin and Sammie Norris, as performed by Lil Jon.
- "Blue Notes 2" is a sequel to "Blue Notes" from DC4, and they both sample "Midnight Blues", performed by Snowy White.

== Personnel ==
- Meek Mill – Vocals (all tracks)
- Popcaan – Vocals (1)
- Sadie Kraft – Vocals (2)
- Lil Baby – Vocals (4)
- Lil Durk – Vocals (4)
- Jena Goldsack – Vocals (5)
- Kehlani – Vocals (6)
- ASAP Ferg – Vocals (7)
- Moneybagg Yo – Vocals (8)
- Giggs – Vocals (10)
- Young Thug – Vocals (11)
- Vory – Vocals (12)
- Lil Uzi Vert – Vocals (14)
- Brent Faiyaz – Vocals (17)
- Cardo – Production (1, 2, 10)
- Nick Papz – Production (4, 8, 14)
- Xander – Production (4, 8, 14)
- Austin Powerz – Production (6, 16, 17)
- Fuse – Production (3, 13)
- KJ – Production (4, 8)
- Boi-1da – Production (7, 12)
- Yung Exclusive – Production (1)
- Johnny Juliano – Production (1)
- Deats – Production (2)
- Yugo Getit – Production (3)
- Gingr – Production (3)
- JW Lucas – Production (3)
- Svdominik – Production (4)
- DZL – Production (5)
- Sav – Production (6)
- Hollywood Cole – Production (7)
- Jahaan Sweet – Production (7)
- Eza – Production (8)
- AT – Production (9)
- Gebrelul – Production (9)
- Emkay – Production (10)
- Tay Keith – Production (11)
- Denaro Love – Production (11)
- Minor2Go – Production (11)
- Maneesh – Production (12)
- Vinylz – Production (12)
- Amore – Production (13)
- Dato – Production (13)
- Dougie on the Beat – Production (15)
- Bkorn – Production (16)
- Brent Faiyaz – Production (17)
- Sevn Thomas – Production (17)
- Paperboy Fabe – Production (17)
- L.3.G.I.O.N. – Production (17)
- 30 Roc – Production (18)
- Datboi Squeeze – Production (18)
- Vianey OJ – Co-production (5)
- Darko – Co-production (5)

== Charts ==
=== Weekly charts ===
Weekly chart performance for Expensive Pain
Chart (2021)	Peak position
Australian Albums (ARIA)	51
Belgian Albums (Ultratop Flanders)	44
Belgian Albums (Ultratop Wallonia)	107
Canadian Albums (Billboard)	5
Dutch Albums (Album Top 100)	16
French Albums (SNEP)	111
New Zealand Albums (RMNZ)	35
Norwegian Albums (VG-lista)	19
Swiss Albums (Schweizer Hitparade)	33
UK Albums (Official Charts)	23
UK R&B Albums (Official Charts)	12
US Billboard 200	3
US Top R&B/Hip-Hop Albums (Billboard)	2

=== Year-end charts ===
Year-end chart performance for Expensive Pain
Chart (2021)	Position
US Billboard 200	190
US Top R&B/Hip-Hop Albums (Billboard)	69
