= Pain Away =

2020 single by Meek Mill featuring Lil Durk

Single by Meek Mill featuring Lil Durk

from the EP Quarantine Pack
- Released: November 20, 2020
- Length: 3:16
- Label: Maybach; Atlantic
- Songwriters: Robert Williams; Durk Banks; Larry Griffin Jr.; Stuart Lowery; Raphael Saadiq; D'wayne Wiggins; Clemon Riley; Carl Wheeler
- Producers: S1; Epikh Pro

Meek Mill singles chronology
"Otherside of America" (2020)	"Pain Away" (2020)	"Conga" (2021)

Lil Durk singles chronology
"Hasta Luego (Remix)" (2020)	"Pain Away" (2020)	"Help You Out" (2020)

Music video
- "Pain Away" on YouTube

"Pain Away" is a song by American rapper Meek Mill, released on November 20, 2020 from his EP Quarantine Pack. Featuring American rapper Lil Durk, it was produced by S1 and Epikh Pro.

== Background ==
Meek Mill teased the song and its video on Instagram in September 2020. The track originally featured American rappers A Boogie wit da Hoodie and Roddy Ricch. In October 2020, Canadian rapper Drake urged Meek Mill on Instagram to release the song.

== Content ==
The song finds the rappers reflecting on the emotional suffering and losses they have experienced in the past during their respective rises to prominence, as well as injustices they have faced and their difficulty to trust others. In the chorus, Meek Mill expresses his wish for the money from his success to ease his pain: "I just hope this money take the pain away / And I've been tryna save my money for a rainy day / But I just bought that Rolls truck to take the pain away / And all these diamonds give me confidence / Don't judge my pain if you don't know the shit that I'm against".

== Music video ==
The music video begins with Meek Mill showing a stack of cash in one hand and carrying a weapon in the other. He is seen outside in numerous environments, as he flaunts his money, cars, private jet, chains and home, and rides in ATVs as well. The setting changes to nightfall, after which Lil Durk performs his verse.

== Charts ==
Chart performance for "Pain Away"
Chart (2020)	Peak position
Global 200 (Billboard)	169
US Billboard Hot 100	86
US Hot R&B/Hip-Hop Songs (Billboard)	28
