= Otherside of America =

2020 protest song by Meek Mill

Single by Meek Mill
- Released: June 5, 2020
- Genre: Political hip hop; conscious hip hop
- Length: 3:39
- Label: Atlantic; Maybach
- Songwriters: Robert Williams; Lenny Williams; Michael Bennett; Antonio Raul Jiminez; Tim Schoegje
- Producers: SHROOM; Butter Beats

Meek Mill singles chronology
"Believe" (2020)	"Otherside of America" (2020)	"Pain Away" (2020)

"Otherside of America" is a protest song by American rapper Meek Mill. The song tackles racial inequality and racism in the United States. It was released on June 5, 2020, amid the Black Lives Matter and George Floyd protests against police brutality in the United States, in the wake of the murder of George Floyd. In the intro, the song contains dialogue from President Donald Trump's 2016 comments about black Americans in an effort to sway the black vote his way.

== Background ==
In the song, Meek Mill illustrates how systemic racism has affected his life, through his own encounters with law enforcement. In 2007, he was arrested in South Philadelphia on a gun and drug charge, and finally, in August 2019, he pled guilty to a misdemeanor while all other charges were absolved. Known for his activism work, in 2019, he co-founded the REFORM Alliance, an organization dedicated to prison reform. He has also advocated for reform in the probation and parole system of Pennsylvania. Meek revealed that Nipsey Hussle and Saint Jhn were initially featured on the song.

== Composition ==
Backed by a "rumbling", "thumping" beat, the song, as noted by The Source's Miss2Bees, "amplifies the voices of ongoing protests against systemic racism and police brutality". Meek also touches on his personal experiences with police brutality and his upbringing in Philadelphia and references his prison stint in 2017.

=== Intro ===
"Otherside of America" opens with an audio dialogue of President Donald Trump's 2016 comments about the black community, in which he suggested they should vote for him because, "You're living in poverty, your schools are no good, you have no jobs, 58 percent of your youth is unemployed – what the hell do you have to lose?". Meek then juxtaposes Trump's statements, beginning his verse with: "Reporting live from the other side of America", telling the story of when he "was just a shorty / then I started spittin' godly, and they said 'record me'", going back through his various times in jail while rising to fame.

=== Outro ===
The song concludes with audio of Meek talking to CNN's Michael A. Smerconish, in an excerpt taken from a 2018 interview between the two. In verified commentary with lyrics annotation website Genius, Meek explained the inspiration for its inclusion in the song: "This interview took place the morning Championships came out. It was early in the morning the day after my release party and I could just feel the love from everyone about the album dropping". The song ends with Meek asking Smerconish, "You see murder, you even see seven people die a week, I think you would carry a gun yourself. Would you?", to which Smerconish replies, "Uh, yeah, I probably would".

== Cover art ==
According to Meek, the cover art is an image taken at the 2020 George Floyd protests in Philadelphia.

== Critical reception ==
Tyler Schmitt of Variance magazine called the track "gripping". Both Rolling Stone's Daniel Kreps and Cerys Kenneally of The Line of The Best Fit said Meek has "hard-hitting bars", with Kenneally noting the song for being "a timely track which tackles issues of racial inequality". ABC News Radio called the track "passionate", as Meek "expresses his anguish and fear towards police" following George Floyd's murder. Likiewise, Complex's Joe Price labeled it "passionate" and "fiery". Dan DeLuca of The Philadelphia Inquirer also called it "passionate", and Meek's salvo, "hard-hitting". Entertainment Weekly's Marcus Jones named it one of the five best songs of the week, asserting "If there is one black American artist capable of sharing intimate details on what the specter of the police state feels like, it's Meek Mill". Nina Corcoran of Consequence of Sound said the song should not be mistaken for "your usual protest song", emphasizing how Meek "spends his time talking about the effects of poverty, violence, and racism on black kids-turned-teenagers with nuance and vivid imagery". Spin magazine said "Mill uses incisive lyrics to trace the perils of what African-Americans are going through and have gone through". Sidney Madden of NPR said although the song's theme is not new territory for Meek, "the bars hold even more weight in this moment".

== Charts ==
Weekly chart performance for "Otherside of America"
Chart (2020)	Peak position
Canada Hot 100 (Billboard)	100
US Billboard Hot 100	64
US Hot R&B/Hip-Hop Songs (Billboard)	27
US Rolling Stone 100	46

== See also ==
- "The Bigger Picture", a song by Lil Baby, also released in June 2020, and associated with Black Lives Matter and George Floyd
