= Angels in the Sky (Polo G song) =

2024 single by Polo G

Single by Polo G

from the album Hood Poet
- Released: May 31, 2024
- Length: 2:42
- Label: Columbia
- Songwriters: Taurus Bartlett; Daniel Ivy; 1HittWonder
- Producers: Oz on the Track; 1HittWonder

Polo G singles chronology
"Sorrys & Ferraris" (2022)	"Angels in the Sky" (2024)	"To the Grave" (2024)

Music video
- "Angels in the Sky" on YouTube

"Angels in the Sky" is a song by American rapper Polo G, released on May 31, 2024, as the third single from his fourth studio album, Hood Poet (2024). It was produced by Oz on the Track and 1HittWonder.

== Composition ==
The song opens with an "ominous, echoed loop", preceding a hard-hitting beat. It finds Polo G melodically rhyming about his personal struggles and how gang violence has affected him.

== Music video ==
The music video was directed by Troy Roscoe. In it, Polo G has been committed to a psychiatric hospital and is wearing a hospital gown. Inside a locked room, he watches videos of his past life on television, which show him meeting fans, being questioned by the police and overdosing on pills. Each version of himself from the videos is brought out of their reality and time and to a holding cell. Polo enters and reconciles with his past lives.

== Charts ==
Chart performance for "Angels in the Sky"
Chart (2024)	Peak position
New Zealand Hot Singles (RMNZ)	14
