= Papamitrou =

Music producer aka Nik Papz

- Also known as: Nick Papz; Nik Papamitrou
- Born: Nikolas Papamitrou
- Years active: 2013–present
- Label: Dream Chasers
- Member of: Meek Mill

Nikolas Papamitrou (born October 3, 1995), better known mononymously as Papamitrou or by the stage name Nick Papz, is a music producer from Massachusetts. Papamitrou is currently the first signed producer to Meek Mill's record label: Dreamchasers.

== Career ==
Nikolas Papamitrou aka Nick Papz, graduated Husson University with a BS degree in Communications Technology. He started a YouTube channel at the age of sixteen producing "Meek Mill Type Beats" which was getting attention and thousands of subscribers. Papamitrou started communicating with well known producers such as Sap (producer) and Jahlil Beats. He was originally discovered through Instagram by a fan tagging Meek Mill's manager on his beat video. Papamitrou got signed to Dreamchasers soon after that. Papamitrou became notable after releasing his beat tapes "Apollo" and "Cuatro" on SoundCloud and MyMixtapez, which set him off with the help of Meek Mill promoting him.

In February 2017, Papamitrou released two major songs on Don Q's project "Corner Stories" named "Don Vito," & "It's All Love" with a feature from Dave East. He then released a song with Meek Mill on the Meekend II mixtape called, "Young Nxxx Dreams," (ft. YFN Lucci & Barcelini). On July 21, 2017, Meek Mill released the Wins & Losses album worldwide with three major songs produced by Papamitrou. He produced the intro called "Wins & Losses", "Connect The Dots" (ft. Yo Gotti & Rick Ross) and "These Scars"(ft. Future & Guordan Banks). The Wins and Losses Album debuted at No. 3 on the Billboard 200 Albums Chart with 102,000 units in album sales on its first week. The album remained at No. 3 for the second week. Papamitrou explained how he got involved with Meek Mill and the Dreamchasers in an interview with My Mixtapez

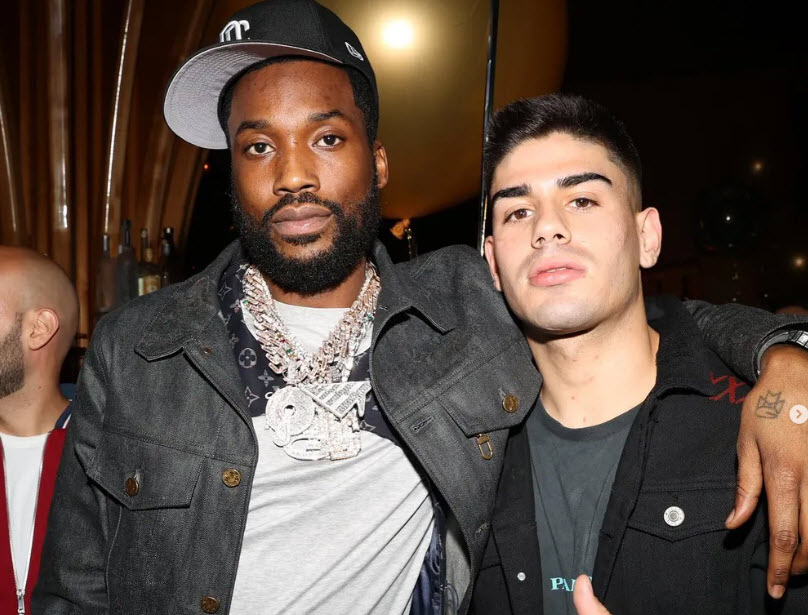
Meek Mill and Nick Papz

Papamitrou also works with many other artists such as Dave East (Album Karma2) Don Q on his song Trap Phone and mixtape Corner Stories.

In November 2018, Meek Mill released his new album Championships that made #1 on the Billboard 200. Papamitrou produced four songs on that album of which three made it to the Billboard Hot 100. The album was also nominated for Best Rap Album at the 2020 Grammys.

In 2021 Nik was part of Meek's new album: "Expensive Pain" and also continue to expand and being part of other artists' projects such as Lil Baby and Snoop Dogg.

== Mixtapes ==
- Historic (2013)
- Trapademikz (2016)
- Apollo (2016)
- Cuatro (2017)
- 7 Series ft. Jahlil Beats
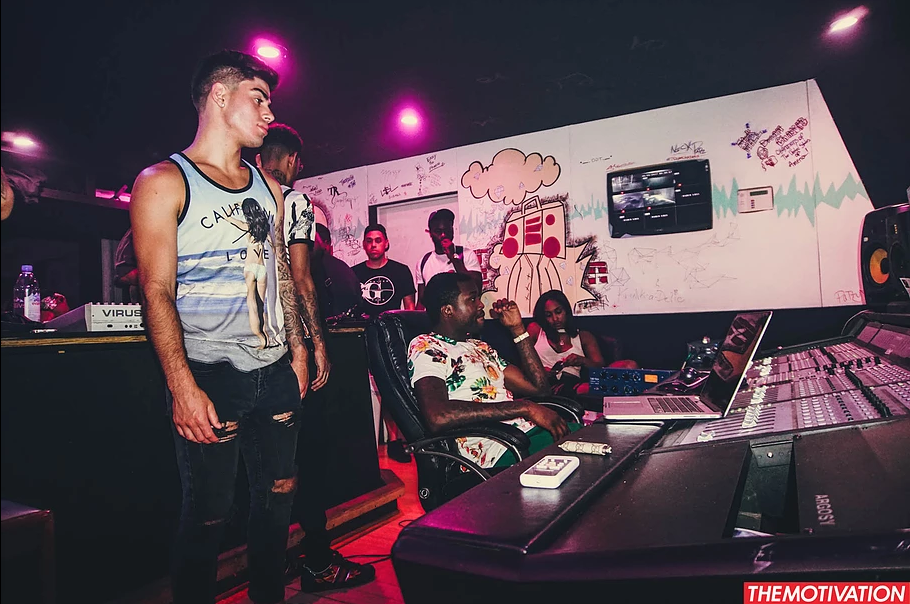
  Nik Papamitrou working at the studio with the Dreamchasers Team
- Corner Stories

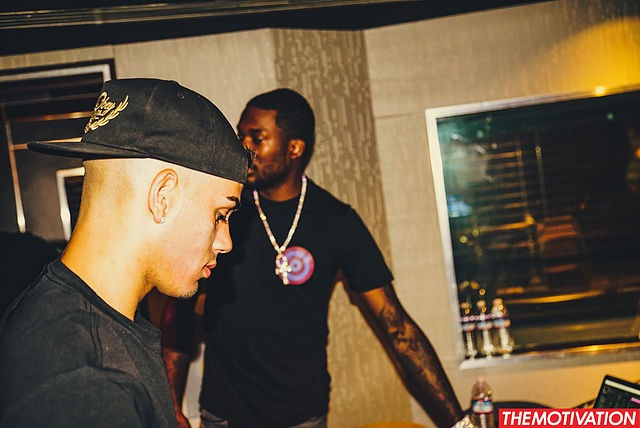
Nik Papamitrou in the Studio with Meek Mill

== Production discography ==
		Peak chart positions								
Year	Title	US Hot 100	US Hot R&B/Hip Hop	US Rap	CAN	Rap Streaming Songs	Album/EP	Billboard 200 Albums Chart	Song Certification	Album Certification
2016	"Don Vito" by Don Q						Corner Stories Reloaded			
2016	"It's All Love" by Don Q featuring Dave East						Corner Stories			
2017	"Young Nigga Dreams" by Meek Mill featuring YFN Lucci & Barcelini						Meekend II			
2017	"Wins & Losses" Intro by Meek Mill	79	32	24			Wins & Losses	3		RIAA:Gold
2017	"Connect the Dots" by Meek Mill featuring Yo Gotti & Rick Ross						Wins & Losses	3		RIAA:Gold
2017	"These Scars" by Meek Mill featuring Future & Guordan Banks						Wins & Losses	3		RIAA:Gold
2018	"Trap Phone" by Don Q featuring Desiigner						Don Talk			
2018	"On God by Dave East									
2018	"Scale and a Razor" by Dave East						Karma 2			
2018	"Going Hard" by Dave East						Karma 2			
2018	"Intro" by Meek Mill	55	26	25		19	Championships	1		RIAA:Platinum; Music Canada:Platinum
2018	"Respect the Game" by Meek Mill	57	27			32	Championships	1	RIAA: Gold	RIAA:Platinum; Music Canada: Platinum
2018	"Uptown Vibes" by Meek Mill, (Ft. Fabolous, Annuel AA)	39	17	15		11	Championships	1	RIAA: Gold	RIAA:Platinum; Music Canada:Platinum
2018	"Fresh Prince of Belair" by Dave East & Rick Ross									
2018	"Cold Hearted II" by Meek Mill						Championships	1		RIAA:Platinum; Music Canada:Platinum
2019	"Chariot" by Calboy (ft. Meek Mill, Lil Durk, Young Thug)						Wildboy	30	RIAA: Gold	RIAA: Gold
2019	"Hot Boy" by Shaun Sloan						1800 Seconds Vol. 2			
2019	"Top Down" by Lihtz Kamraz & Test						1800 Seconds Vol. 2			
2019	"Put It in Drive" by Test & Herion Young						1800 Seconds Vol. 2			
2019	"Field Trip" by Aurora Anthony						1800 Seconds Vol. 2			
2019	"Hit Like Mike" by Herion Young						1800 Seconds Vol. 2			
2019	"What Did You Do to Me" by Juiicy 2xs						1800 Seconds Vol. 2			
2019	"Don't Stop" by Test						1800 Seconds Vol. 2			
2019	"Dickie Fit" by Seddy Hendrinx						1800 Seconds Vol. 2			
2019	"Out the Mud" by Lihtz Kamraz						1800 Seconds Vol. 2			
2019	"My Bae" by Juiicy 2xs, Seddy Hendrinx						1800 Seconds Vol. 2			
2019	"Losing My Mind" by Test, Herion Young & Lihtz Kamraz						1800 Seconds Vol. 2			
2019	"Family" by Aurora Anthony, Lihtz Kamraz, Seddy Hendrinx & Juiicy 2xs						1800 Seconds Vol. 2			
2020	"Uptown II" by Meek Mill (ft. Farruko)						Bad Boys for Life soundtrack			
2020	"Letter to Nipsey" by Meek Mill (ft. Roddy Ricch)	73	34							
2020	"I Lied (Intro)" by Joyner Lucas						ADHD	10		
2020	"Double Bacc" by NLE Choppa						Top Shotta			RIAA: Gold
2020	"Miss You" by The Lox (ft. T-Pain)						Living Off Xperience			
2020	"Fall Slowly" by Joyner Lucas (ft. Ashanti)						ADHD	10		
2020	"Feel the Vibe" by Shy Grizzly (ft. Meek Mill)						Young Jefe 3			
2020	"So Crazy" by Davido (ft. Lil Baby)						A Better Time (ABT)			
2020	"GTA" by Meek Mill (ft. 42 Dugg)						QUARANTINE PACK			
2020	"Middle of it" by Meek Mill (ft. Vory)						QUARANTINE PACK			
2020	"All Due Respect by Vory						Vory			
2020	"Harder than Pain" by Vory						Vory			
2021	"That Go!" by Young Thug (ft. Meel Mill, T-Shyne)		43				Slime Language 2	1		
2021	"Break the Bank" by Tafia (ft. Meek Mill)						Street Clarity			
2021	"Pack" by Tafia						Street Clarity			
2021	"Still Runnin" by Lil Baby & Lil Durk (ft. Meek Mill)						The Voice of the Heroes	1		RIAA:Gold
2021	"Sharing Locations" by Meek Mill (feat. Lil Baby and Lil Durk)	22	12	10	36		Expensive Pain	2		
2021	"Blue Notes 2" by Meek Mill (feat. Lil Uzi Vert)	87	45				Expensive Pain	2		
2021	"Hot" by Meek Mill						Expensive Pain	2		
2021	"On Tank" by 42 Dugg						Free Dem Boyz (Deluxe)			
2021	"30 for 30" by T-Shyne						Confetti Nights			
2021	"I'm Hot" by BRS Cash									
2022	"Been on it" by Tafia						Mention my Name			
2022	"RBS (Rich Bish Shit)" by BRS Cash									
2022	"Let me see it" by Zoey Dollaz (Feat. Quavo)						Thank You For Doubting Me			
2022	"Detox" by Lil Baby									
2022	"Around Here" by Snoop Dogg & DJ Drama						Gangsta Grillz: I Still Got It			
2022	"Dolla Signs" by Snoop Dogg & DJ Drama						Gangsta Grillz: I Still Got It			
