= Polo G discography =

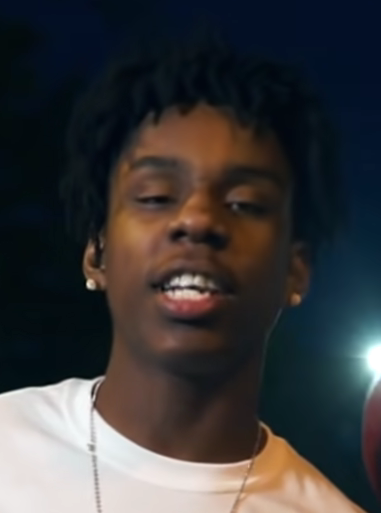
- Polo G in 2018
- Studio albums: 4
- Singles: 56

The discography of American rapper Polo G consists of four studio albums and 56 singles (including 21 as a featured artist). His debut studio album, Die a Legend (2019), peaked at number 6 on the US Billboard 200. The album also includes singles such as "Finer Things", "Battle Cry", "Pop Out", and "Deep Wounds"; as well as "Pop Out Again", a remix featuring Lil Baby and Gunna. "Rapstar" became Polo G's highest-charting song worldwide, peaking at number 1 on the US Billboard Hot 100. His second studio album, The Goat (2020), reached the number two spot on the US Billboard 200. The album was supported by five singles, including "Heartless", "Go Stupid", "DND", "Wishing for a Hero", and "Martin & Gina".

Polo G released "Rapstar" in April 2021 as the third single from his third studio album, Hall of Fame, with the song debuting at the number-one spot on the US Billboard Hot 100. Hall of Fame also became his first number-one album on the Billboard 200. At the end of 2021, he released a deluxe reissue of the album, Hall of Fame 2.0. In 2022, Polo G teased his fourth studio album, Hood Poet, with a planned 2023 release date, the album was delayed until 2024 and was a commercial failure, debuting at #28 on the Billboard 200.

== Albums ==
=== Studio albums ===
List of studio albums, with selected chart positions and certifications
Title	Album details	Peak chart positions								Certifications
Title	Album details	US	US R&B/HH	US Rap	AUS	CAN	NLD	NZ	UK	Certifications
Die a Legend	Released: June 7, 2019; Label: Columbia; Format: LP, digital download, streaming	6	2	1	—	20	83	—	—	RIAA: 2× Platinum; BPI: Gold; MC: 2× Platinum
The Goat	Released: May 15, 2020; Label: Columbia; Format: LP, digital download, streaming	2	2	2	10	2	11	20	6	RIAA: 3× Platinum; ARIA: Gold; BPI: Gold; MC: 3× Platinum; RMNZ: 2× Platinum
Hall of Fame	Released: June 11, 2021; Label: Columbia; Format: CD, LP, digital download, streaming	1	1	1	3	2	3	2	3	RIAA: 3× Platinum; BPI: Silver; MC: 2× Platinum; RMNZ: Platinum
Hood Poet	Released: August 9, 2024; Label: Columbia; Format: Digital download, streaming	28	6	5	—	64	—	—	—	
"—" denotes a recording that did not chart or was not released in that territory.

=== Deluxe albums ===
Title	Album details
Hall of Fame 2.0	Released: December 3, 2021; Label: Columbia; Format: Digital download, streaming
Hood Poet: Black Heart Edition	Released: December 19, 2025; Label: Columbia; Format: Digital download, streaming

== Singles ==
=== As lead artist ===
List of singles as lead artist, with selected chart positions and certifications shown
Title	Year	Peak chart positions									Certifications	Album
Title	Year	US	US R&B/HH	US Rap	AUS	CAN	IRE	NZ Hot	UK	WW	Certifications	Album
"Neva Cared"	2018	—	—	—	—	—	—	—	—	—	RMNZ: Gold	Non-album singles
"The Come Up"	2018	—	—	—	—	—	—	—	—	—		Non-album singles
"Gang WithMe"	2018	—	—	—	—	—	—	—	—	—		Non-album singles
"Hollywood"	2018	—	—	—	—	—	—	—	—	—		Non-album singles
"Finer Things"	2019	—	—	—	—	—	—	—	—	—	RIAA: 3× Platinum; BPI: Silver; MC: 2× Platinum	Die a Legend
"Battle Cry"	2019	—	—	—	—	—	—	—	—	—	RIAA: Gold	Die a Legend
"Pop Out" (featuring Lil Tjay)	2019	11	7	5	73	12	61	—	41	—	RIAA: 9× Platinum; ARIA: Gold; BPI: Platinum; MC: 9× Platinum; RMNZ: 2× Platinum	Die a Legend
"Deep Wounds"	2019	—	—	—	—	—	—	—	—	—	RIAA: Platinum	Die a Legend
"Pop Out Again" (featuring Lil Baby and Gunna)	2019	—	—	—	—	—	—	—	—	—		Die a Legend
"Heartless" (featuring Mustard)	2019	— (Note: "Heartless" did not enter the Billboard Hot 100, but peaked at number three on the Bubbling Under Hot 100 chart.)	—	—	—	—	—	—	—	—	RIAA: 3× Platinum; MC: 2× Platinum; RMNZ: Gold	The Goat
"First Place" (with Lil Tjay)	2020	—	—	—	—	—	—	—	—	—	RIAA: Gold	Non-album single
"Go Stupid" (with Stunna 4 Vegas and NLE Choppa featuring Mike Will Made It)	2020	60	29	20	—	28	97	16	—	—	RIAA: 4× Platinum; BPI: Silver; MC: 3× Platinum; RMNZ: Platinum	The Goat
"DND"	2020	84	37	—	—	—	—	33	—	—	RIAA: Platinum	The Goat
"Wishing for a Hero" (featuring BJ the Chicago Kid)	2020	— (Note: "Wishing for a Hero" did not enter the Billboard Hot 100, but peaked at number seven on the Bubbling Under Hot 100 chart.)	—	—	—	—	—	29	—	—	RIAA: Gold	The Goat
"Martin & Gina"	2020	61	22	22	42	52	32	23	48	94	RIAA: 7× Platinum; ARIA: 2× Platinum; BPI: Platinum; MC: 7× Platinum; RMNZ: 3× Platinum	The Goat
"Epidemic"	2020	47	17	16	—	41	46	8	54	56	RIAA: 2× Platinum; BPI: Silver; MC: Platinum; RMNZ: Gold	Hall of Fame
"GNF (OKOKOK)"	2021	55	22	17	—	55	—	8	—	109	RIAA: Gold; MC: Gold	Hall of Fame
"Headshot" (with Lil Tjay and Fivio Foreign)	2021	42	21	15	70	16	39	7	40	42	RIAA: 2× Platinum; MC: Gold; RMNZ: Gold	Destined 2 Win
"Rapstar"	2021	1	1	1	4	1	2	1	3	3	RIAA: 8× Platinum; ARIA: 2× Platinum; BPI: Platinum; MC: 6× Platinum; RMNZ: 2× Platinum	Hall of Fame
"Gang Gang" (with Lil Wayne)	2021	33	13	9	67	34	42	7	56	44	RIAA: Platinum; MC: Platinum	Hall of Fame
"Waves" (with Gunna)	2021	—	—	—	—	—	—	—	—	—		Culture Jam
"Better Days" (with Neiked and Mae Muller)	2021	23	—	—	16	23	20	3	32	33	RIAA: Platinum; ARIA: Platinum; BPI: Gold; MC: Platinum; RMNZ: 2× Platinum	Sorry I'm Late
"Bad Man (Smooth Criminal)"	2021	49	10	7	48	39	37	7	47	58	RIAA: Platinum; RMNZ: Gold	Hall of Fame 2.0
"Distraction"	2022	39	7	7	—	31	70	7	61	66	RIAA: Gold; MC: Gold	Hood Poet
"Bag Talk"	2022	— (Note: "Bag Talk" did not enter the Billboard Hot 100, but peaked at number seven on the Bubbling Under Hot 100 chart.)	41	—	—	—	—	20	—	—		Non-album singles
"My All"	2022	— (Note: "My All" did not enter the Billboard Hot 100, but peaked at number two on the Bubbling Under Hot 100 chart.)	50	—	—	—	—	11	—	—		Non-album singles
"No Time Wasted" (featuring Future)	2023	69	27	14	—	73	—	17	—	—		Non-album singles
"Heartbroken" (with Diplo and Jessie Murph)	2023	64	—	—	—	52	—	11	—	—	RIAA: Platinum; ARIA: Platinum; RMNZ: Gold	Diplo Presents Thomas Wesley, Chapter 2: Swamp Savant
"Barely Holdin' On"	2023	68	23	20	—	93	—	4	—	—	RIAA: Gold	Hood Poet
"Sorrys & Ferraris"	2024	— (Note: "Sorrys & Ferraris" did not enter the Billboard Hot 100, but peaked at number nine on the Bubbling Under Hot 100 chart.)	49	—	—	—	—	20	—	—		Non-album single
"Angels in the Sky"	2024	—	—	—	—	—	—	14	—	—		Hood Poet
"We Uh Shoot" (with Lil Durk)	2024	—	—	—	—	—	—	27	—	—		Hood Poet
"Way Out The Hood II" (with Lil Tjay)	2024	—	—	—	—	—	—	—	—	—		Non-album single
"Pangea" (with Mata)	2026	—	—	—	—	—	—	—	—	—		#Mata2040
"Clap"	2026	—	—	—	—	—	—	—	—	—		Non-album singles
"Weight On My Shoulders"	2026	—	—	—	—	—	—	—	—	—		Non-album singles
"OMG"	2026	—	—	—	—	—	—	—	—	—		Non-album singles
"—" denotes a recording that did not chart or was not released in that territory.

=== As featured artist ===
Title	Year	Peak chart positions										Certifications	Album
Title	Year	US	US R&B/HH	AUS	CAN	DEN	IRE	LIT	NLD Tip	NOR	UK	Certifications	Album
"No Patience" (CashMoneyAP featuring Polo G and NoCap)	2019	—	—	—	—	—	—	—	—	—	—		Non-album single
"Caroline" (Calboy featuring Polo G)	2019	—	—	—	—	—	—	—	—	—	—		Wildboy
"All In" (Clever featuring Polo G and G Herbo)	2019	—	—	—	—	—	—	—	—	—	—		Non-album single
"Marvelous" (Quando Rondo featuring Polo G)	2020	—	—	—	—	—	—	—	—	—	—		QPac
"3 Headed Goat" (Lil Durk featuring Lil Baby and Polo G)	2020	43	15	—	77	—	—	—	—	—	—	RIAA: 4× Platinum; BPI: Silver; RMNZ: Gold	Just Cause Y'all Waited 2
"Pricetag" (Mozzy featuring Polo G and Lil Poppa)	2020	—	—	—	—	—	—	—	—	—	—		Beyond Bulletproof
"Doors Unlocked" (Murda Beatz featuring Polo G and Ty Dolla Sign)	2020	—	—	—	—	—	—	—	—	—	—		Non-album singles
"Purple" (Charlie Sloth featuring Polo G and Deno)	2020	—	—	—	—	—	—	—	—	—	—		Non-album singles
"Bookbag 2.0" (BigKayBeezy featuring Polo G)	2020	—	—	—	—	—	—	—	—	—	—		Bad Intentions
"Bop It" (Fivio Foreign featuring Polo G)	2020	—	—	—	—	—	—	—	—	—	—		Non-album single
"The Code" (King Von featuring Polo G)	2020	66	22	—	90	—	—	—	—	—	—	RIAA: Platinum	Welcome to O'Block
"Goat Talk 2" (Hotboii featuring Polo G)	2020	—	—	—	—	—	—	—	—	—	—		Non-album single
"Patience" (KSI featuring Yungblud and Polo G)	2021	—	—	61	94	37	8	85	8	37	3	BPI: Gold	All Over the Place
"Richer" (Rod Wave featuring Polo G)	2021	22	13	—	74	—	—	—	—	—	—	RIAA: 6× Platinum	SoulFly
"Beat Box 5" (SpotemGottem featuring Polo G)	2021	—	—	—	—	—	—	—	—	—	—		Non-album single
"On Go" (Sheff G featuring Polo G)	2021	—	—	—	—	—	—	—	—	—	—	RIAA: Gold	From the Can
"Last One Standing" (Skylar Grey featuring Polo G, Mozzy, and Eminem)	2021	78	31	—	38	—	—	—	—	26	46	RIAA: Gold	Venom: Let There Be Carnage (Original Motion Picture Soundtrack)
"Want It All" (Burna Boy featuring Polo G)	2021	—	—	—	—	—	—	—	—	—	—		Non-album single
"Jumpin" (NLE Choppa featuring Polo G)	2021	89	40	—	74	—	—	—	—	—	—	RIAA: Gold; MC: Gold	Me vs. Me
"Waddup" (Remix) (PGF Nuk featuring Polo G)	2022	— (Note: "Waddup" (Remix) did not enter the Billboard Hot 100, but peaked at number 20 on the Bubbling Under Hot 100 chart.)	44	—	—	—	—	—	—	—	—		Switch Music
"9 Lives" (DDG featuring Polo G and NLE Choppa)	2022	—	50	—	—	—	—	—	—	—	—		It's Not Me, It's You
"Grown Man" (Marshmello featuring Polo G and Southside)	2023	—	—	—	—	—	—	—	—	—	—		Non-album single
"—" denotes a recording that did not chart or was not released in that territory.

== Other charted and certified songs ==
Title	Year	Peak chart positions								Certifications	Album
Title	Year	US	US R&B/HH	AUS	CAN	IRE	NZ Hot	UK	WW	Certifications	Album
"Dyin Breed"	2019	—	—	—	—	—	—	—	—	RIAA: Platinum	Die a Legend
"Through da Storm"	2019	— (Note: "Through da Storm" did not enter the Billboard Hot 100, but peaked at number 25 on the Bubbling Under Hot 100 chart.)	—	—	—	—	—	—	—	RIAA: 3× Platinum; BPI: Gold; MC: 2× Platinum; RMNZ: Platinum	Die a Legend
"Effortless"	2019	—	—	—	—	—	—	—	—	RIAA: Platinum	Die a Legend
"BST"	2019	—	—	—	—	—	—	—	—	RIAA: Gold	Die a Legend
"Picture This"	2019	—	—	—	—	—	—	—	—	RIAA: Gold	Die a Legend
"Chosen 1"	2019	—	—	—	—	—	—	—	—	RIAA: 2× Platinum; BPI: Silver; MC: Platinum; RMNZ: Gold	Die a Legend
"Don't Believe the Hype"	2020	88	44	—	—	—	—	—	—	RIAA: Gold	The Goat
"Flex" (featuring Juice Wrld)	2020	30	14	—	60	75	8	91	—	RIAA: 4× Platinum; BPI: Silver; MC: 3× Platinum; RMNZ: Gold	The Goat
"21"	2020	62	27	—	86	82	—	—	—	RIAA: 4× Platinum; BPI: Gold; MC: Platinum; RMNZ: Platinum	The Goat
"33"	2020	93	48	—	—	—	—	—	—	RIAA: Platinum	The Goat
"I Know"	2020	95	50	—	—	—	—	—	—	RIAA: 2× Platinum; BPI: Silver; RMNZ: Gold	The Goat
"Beautiful Pain (Losin My Mind)"	2020	92	47	—	—	—	26	—	—	RIAA: Platinum	The Goat
"Be Something" (featuring Lil Baby)	2020	57	23	—	90	—	—	—	—	RIAA: 2× Platinum; MC: Gold	The Goat
"Relentless"	2020	—	—	—	—	—	—	—	—	RIAA: Gold	The Goat
"Trials & Tribulations"	2020	—	—	—	—	—	—	—	—	RIAA: Gold	The Goat
"Hate the Other Side" (Juice Wrld and Marshmello featuring Polo G and the Kid Laroi)	2020	10	8	—	12	—	3	—	—	RIAA: Platinum; BPI: Silver; RMNZ: Platinum	Legends Never Die
"When You Down" (with Lil Tecca featuring Lil Durk)	2020	90	32	—	77	—	24	—	140		Virgo World
"Free Promo" (Moneybagg Yo featuring Polo G and Lil Durk)	2021	80	32	—	—	—	—	—	171		A Gangsta's Pain
"Painting Pictures"	2021	59	25	—	58	—	—	—	78	RIAA: Gold	Hall of Fame
"No Return" (featuring the Kid Laroi and Lil Durk)	2021	26	11	33	26	40	3	47	38	RIAA: Platinum; MC: Gold	Hall of Fame
"Toxic"	2021	63	27	—	61	—	—	—	90	RIAA: Gold	Hall of Fame
"Boom"	2021	89	39	—	83	—	—	—	147		Hall of Fame
"Black Hearted"	2021	53	23	—	47	47	9	65	65	RIAA: Platinum	Hall of Fame
"Broken Guitars" (featuring Scorey)	2021	— (Note: "Broken Guitars" did not enter the Billboard Hot 100, but peaked at number seven on the Bubbling Under Hot 100 chart.)	—	—	—	—	—	—	200		Hall of Fame
"Go Part 1" (featuring G Herbo)	2021	86	38	—	—	—	—	—	158		Hall of Fame
"Heart of a Giant" (featuring Rod Wave)	2021	83	35	—	—	—	—	—	143	RIAA: Gold	Hall of Fame
"Zooted Freestyle"	2021	— (Note: "Zooted Freestyle" did not enter the Billboard Hot 100, but peaked at number 12 on the Bubbling Under Hot 100 chart.)	—	—	—	—	—	—	—		Hall of Fame
"Party Lyfe" (featuring DaBaby)	2021	85	37	—	64	—	10	—	126	RIAA: Gold	Hall of Fame
"Losses" (featuring Young Thug)	2021	— (Note: "Losses" did not enter the Billboard Hot 100, but peaked at number 17 on the Bubbling Under Hot 100 chart.)	—	—	—	—	—	—	—		Hall of Fame
"So Real"	2021	— (Note: "So Real" did not enter the Billboard Hot 100, but peaked at number four on the Bubbling Under Hot 100 chart.)	49	—	—	—	—	—	170	RIAA: Gold	Hall of Fame
"Fame & Riches" (featuring Roddy Ricch)	2021	— (Note: "Fame & Riches" did not enter the Billboard Hot 100, but peaked at number nine on the Bubbling Under Hot 100 chart.)	—	—	—	—	—	—	—		Hall of Fame
"For the Love of New York" (with Nicki Minaj)	2021	— (Note: "For the Love of New York" did not enter the Billboard Hot 100, but peaked at number one on the Bubbling Under Hot 100 chart.)	45	—	—	—	—	—	179		Hall of Fame
"Clueless" (featuring Pop Smoke and Fivio Foreign)	2021	79	32	—	40	—	8	—	109	RIAA: Gold	Hall of Fame
"Bloody Canvas"	2021	97	42	—	88	—	—	—	176	RIAA: Gold	Hall of Fame
"Malibu" (Migos featuring Polo G)	2021	65	28	—	57	—	—	—	73		Culture III
"Cry No More" (with G Herbo and Lil Tjay)	2021	81	29	—	—	—	—	—	—		25
"Not Sober" (The Kid Laroi featuring Polo G and Stunna Gambino)	2021	41	14	8	22	43	2	42	31	RIAA: Gold; MC: Gold; RMNZ: Gold	F*ck Love 3: Over You
"Rich MF" (Trippie Redd featuring Polo G and Lil Durk)	2021	56	17	—	—	—	—	—	67	RIAA: Gold	Trip at Knight
"Don't Play" (featuring Lil Baby)	2021	66	17	—	69	—	21	—	118	RIAA: Gold	Hall of Fame 2.0
"Start Up Again" (featuring Moneybagg Yo)	2021	94	31	—	—	—	—	—	—		Hall of Fame 2.0
"Heating Up" (featuring YungLiv)	2021	— (Note: "Heating Up" did not enter the Billboard Hot 100, but peaked at number 16 on the Bubbling Under Hot 100 chart.)	47	—	—	—	—	—	—		Hall of Fame 2.0
"Black Man in America"	2021	— (Note: "Black Man in America" did not enter the Billboard Hot 100, but peaked at number 24 on the Bubbling Under Hot 100 chart.)	—	—	—	—	—	—	—		Hall of Fame 2.0
"Young n Dumb"	2021	87	27	—	89	—	19	—	—		Hall of Fame 2.0
"Unapologetic" (featuring NLE Choppa)	2021	— (Note: "Unapologetic" did not enter the Billboard Hot 100, but peaked at number three on the Bubbling Under Hot 100 chart.)	38	—	—	—	33	—	—	RIAA: Gold	Hall of Fame 2.0
"Fortnight"	2021	— (Note: "Fortnight" did not enter the Billboard Hot 100, but peaked at number 10 on the Bubbling Under Hot 100 chart.)	44	—	—	—	—	—	—		Hall of Fame 2.0
"Partin Ways"	2021	100	34	—	—	—	—	—	—	RIAA: Platinum	Hall of Fame 2.0
"Suicide" (featuring Lil Tjay)	2021	— (Note: "Suicide" did not enter the Billboard Hot 100, but peaked at number eight on the Bubbling Under Hot 100 chart.)	41	—	83	—	32	—	—		Hall of Fame 2.0
"Feline" (with Juice Wrld and Trippie Redd)	2021	56	13	86	54	—	4	—	65		Fighting Demons
"Changed on Me" (Fivio Foreign featuring Vory and Polo G)	2022	— (Note: "Changed on Me" did not enter the Billboard Hot 100, but peaked at number one on the Bubbling Under Hot 100 chart.)	38	—	86	—	—	—	—		B.I.B.L.E.
"Phil Jackson" (with King Von)	2023	— (Note: "Phil Jackson" did not enter the Billboard Hot 100, but peaked at number 24 on the Bubbling Under Hot 100 chart.)	36	—	—	—	—	—	—		Grandson
"—" denotes a recording that did not chart or was not released in that territory.

== Guest appearances ==
List of non-single guest appearances, with other performing artists, showing year released and album name
Title	Year	Other artist(s)	Album
"Eternal Living"	2019	Lil Poppa	Under Investigation 2
"Where I'm From"	2019	Quando Rondo, BlocBoy JB	From the Neighborhood to the Stage
"Telescope"	2019	The Plug, Anine, Swarmz	Plug Talk
"FTG"	2019	7981 Kal	Life Without Fear
"Career Day"	2019	Only the Family, Lil Durk	Family over Everything
"Free Melly"	2020	Lil Gotit	Superstar Creature
"Fake Love"	2020	Calboy	Long Live the Kings
"Lawyer Fees"	2020	G Herbo	PTSD
"Murder Rate"	2020	Blueface	Find the Beat
"While I'm Here"	2020	Lil Loaded	A Demon in 6lue
"Handgun"	2020	DaBaby, NoCap	My Brother's Keeper (Long Live G)
"Check On Me"	2020	T9ine	Fast Life Living
"When You Down"	2020	Lil Tecca, Lil Durk	Virgo World
"Last Man Standing"	2021	—N/a	Judas and the Black Messiah: The Inspired Album
"Fashion"	2021	Pop Smoke	Boogie: The Original Motion Picture Soundtrack
"Free Promo"	2021	Moneybagg Yo, Lil Durk	A Gangsta's Pain
"Malibu"	2021	Migos	Culture III
"Ride Da Night"	2021	Kevin Gates, Teejay3k	F9: The Fast Saga (Original Motion Picture Soundtrack)
"Cry No More"	2021	G Herbo, Lil Tjay	25
"Not Sober"	2021	The Kid Laroi, Stunna Gambino	F*ck Love 3: Over You
"Rich MF"	2021	Trippie Redd, Lil Durk	Trip at Knight
"Rock Dat"	2021	Tion Wayne	Green With Envy
"Feline"	2021	Juice Wrld, Trippie Redd	Fighting Demons
"Changed on Me"	2022	Fivio Foreign, Vory	B.I.B.L.E.
"Paranoid"	2022	Coi Leray	Trendsetter
"9 Lives"	2022	DDG, NLE Choppa	It's Not Me It's You
"Beat the Odds Pt 2"	2023	Lil Tjay	222
"Back to the Wall"	2024	Lil Tjay	Farewell
