= Khaled Rohaim =

Egyptian producer and composer

Khaled Rohaim خالد رحيم
- Born: Khaled Rohaim Omar Mohamed Omar Khorshid خالد رحيم عمر محمد عمر خورشيد
- Origin: Egypt

Khaled Rohaim is an Egyptian producer, composer, and songwriter based in Sydney, Australia. He has composed songs for artists such as Rihanna, The Kid Laroi, and Ariana Grande.

== Early life ==
Rohaim has been making music since he was four years old, experimenting with instruments around his family home. His father was a keyboard player for Egyptian guitarist Omar Khorshid.

== Career ==
In 2012, Rohaim signed a publishing deal with J Remy and Bobby Bass of Orange Factory Music in partnership with Primary Wave and BMG.

From 2014 to 2020, Rohaim was part of the production team Twice as Nice, founded by Nicholas "Unknown Nick" Audino and Lewis Hughes. Through Audino, Khaled co-produced songs for artists such as Ty Dolla Sign, Kid Ink, Ariana Grande, and Meghan Trainor, among others.

Rohaim honed his skills creating multi-platinum hits for Australian Sony artists such as Jessica Mauboy and Justice Crew. In 2018, he co-wrote the song "Let Me" by Zayn.

In 2021, Rohaim, Audino, Hughes, and Te Whiti Warbrick from Twice as Nice were added to APRA AMCOS's 1 Billion List for their work on Rihanna's 2016 track "Needed Me".

Rohaim met The Kid Laroi, whose real name is Charlton Howard, at a recording studio in Sydney when Howard was 12 years old. Moved by Howard's talent and difficult living situation, Rohaim became Howard's mentor and collaborator. They would drive together to record at Rohaim's rented studio in North Strathfield and write songs for other artists.

Rohaim has been considering moving to the United States as he continues his work with Howard and other high-profile artists, such as Demi Lovato and Justin Bieber. "I think I'd do better if I was overseas. Being here has been hard, really hard. What I've been able to do from here, it's near impossible", he told The Sydney Morning Herald in 2021.

== Discography ==
Khaled Rohaim selected discography
Year	Artist	Song	Album
2010	Big Time Rush	"Big Time Rush"	BTR
2011	Jay Sean	"Can't Fall In Love"	Hit The Lights
2011	Jay Sean	"Message In A Bottle"	Hit The Lights
2011	Jay Sean	"Hit The Lights"	Hit The Lights
2011	Jay Sean	"Love"	Hit The Lights
2011	Jay Sean	"I'm All Yours	Hit The Lights
2011	Jay Sean	"Sex 101"	Hit The Lights
2011	Big Time Rush	"Superstar"	Elevate
2012	Frankie J	"Like a Flag"	Faith, Hope Y Amor
2012	Jay Sean	"So High"	Neon
2012	Jay Sean	"Deep End"	Neon
2012	Jay Sean	"Neon"	Neon
2012	Jay Sean	"Back To Love (Aaja Re)"	Neon
2012	Jay Sean	"Close to You"	Neon
2012	Jay Sean	"Words"	Neon
2012	Jay Sean	"Where You Are"	Neon
2012	Jay Sean	"Mars"	Neon
2012	Jay Sean	"All On Your Body"	Neon
2012	Jay Sean	"Worth It All"	Neon
2012	Jay Sean	"Passenger Side"	Neon
2012	Jay Sean	"Miss Popular"	Neon
2012	Jay Sean	"Where You Are"	Single
2012	Justice Crew	"Best Night"	"Best Night"
2012	Justice Crew	"Boom Boom"	"Best Night"
2013	Big Time Rush	"Confetti Falling"	24/seven
2013	Faydee	"Can't Let Go"	Single
2013	INNA	"Famous"	Single
2013	Faydee	"Maria"	Single
2014	Faydee	"Far Away"	Single
2014	Elen Levon	"Kingdom"	Single
2014	The Janoskians	"This F***in Song"	Single
2014	Beau Ryan	"Where You From (feat. Justice Crew)"	Single
2014	The Veronicas	"If You Love Someone"	The Veronicas (album)
2014	Justice Crew	"Interlude"	Live By The Words
2014	Justice Crew	"Life's a Party"	Live By The Words
2014	Justice Crew	"Intro"	Live By The Words
2014	Justice Crew	"Always Been Real"	Live By The Words
2015	Manny	"Luv U Better (feat. Faydee)"	
2015	Ty Dolla Sign	"Saved (feat. E-40)"	Free TC
2015	Samantha Jade	"Castle"	Nine
2015	Kid Ink	"Time Out"	Summer In The Winter
2015	Kid Ink	"Summer In The Winter"	Summer In The Winter
2015	Kid Ink	"That's On You"	Summer In The Winter
2016	Mustard, Travis Scott	"Whole Lotta Lovin'"	Single
2016	Rihanna	"Needed Me"	ANTI
2016	DJ Nino Brown	"Status Ain't Real (feat. Iamsu! & Maribelle)"	Single
2016	Chuckie, Childsplay	"Warrior (Club Edit)"	Single
2016	Meghan Trainor	"Champagne Problems"	Thank You
2016	Ariana Grande	"Be Alright"	Dangerous Woman
2016	TYuS	"My Way"	Never Forget
2016	Faydee	"Nobody (feat. Kat Deluna & Leftside)"	Single
2016	Ella Mai	"Switch Sider"	TIME
2016	Ella Mai	"One Day"	TIME
2017	Pitbull	"Better On Me"	Climate Change
2017	Wizkid	"Dirty Wine (feat. Ty Dolla Sign)	Sounds From The Other Side
2017	R3hab, RITUAL	"Hallucinations"	Trouble
2017	Smashproof	"My Crib (feat. Awa, Pieter T)"	The Weekend
2017	JOY.	"Smoke Too Much"	Six EP
2018	JOY.	"Change"	Six EP
2018	JOY.	"This Place (Interlude)"	Six EP
2018	JOY.	"Lose Control"	Six EP
2018	JOY.	"Need You"	Six EP
2018	JOY.	"Hooked (Interlude)"	Six EP
2018	JOY.	"Fake It"	Six EP
2018	R3hab	"Hold On Tight (with Conor Maynard)"	The Wave
2018	R3hab	"The Wave (with Lia Marie Johnson)	The Wave
2018	R3hab	"Belle"	The Wave
2018	R3hab	"Whiplash"	The Wave
2018	Mike Stud, Vory	"Saved From The City"	4THEHOMIES
2018	Matt Black	"Goosebumps"	Single
2018	INNA	"No Help"	Single
2018	Zayn	"Let Me"	Icarus Falls
2018	Zayn	"Fresh Air"	Icarus Falls
2018	Zayn	"Good Years"	Icarus Falls
2018	Zayn	"Common"	Icarus Falls
2018	Zayn	"Natural"	Icarus Falls
2019	Blackbear	"HATE MY GUTS"	ANONYMOUS
2019	Blackbear	"HIGH1X"	ANONYMOUS
2019	Nick Carter, Jordan Knight	"Deja Vu"	Nick & Knight
2019	Ella Vos	"Empty Hands"	Watch & Wait
2019	Kim Viera	"Ay Ay Ay (feat. Pitbull)"	Single
2019	Juto	"FAF"	Wool
2019	4B	"Did You (feat. Chris Brown)"	Single
2019	Phora	"On My Way"	Bury Me With Dead Roses
2019	Anfa Rose	"Sin"	Mermaids
2019	Anfa Rose	"Interiors"	Mermaids
2019	Anfa Rose	"Saviour"	Mermaids
2019	Anfa Rose	"Right Now"	Mermaids
2019	Anfa Rose	"Eyes On Me"	Mermaids
2019	Anfa Rose	"Mermaids"	Mermaids
2019	Anfa Rose	"Pick Up"	Mermaids
2019	Anfa Rose	"Different"	Mermaids
2019	Anfa Rose	"Stability"	Mermaids
2019	Anfa Rose	"Casa"	Mermaids
2019	Anfa Rose	"For Now"	Mermaids
2019	MakeYouKnowLove	"The Highest"	The Highest
2019	JOY.	"Can't Be You"	Single
2019	JOY.	"Diamond"	Single
2020	JOY.	"Anime"	Single
2020	Lil Treezy	"Wolf (feat. A Boogie Wit Da Hoodie)"	Single
2020	Jumex, Lil Xan	"XOXO"	Single
2020	Fujiii Kaze	"Be Alright"	HELP EVER HURT COVER
2020	Daniyel	"Still Holding On	Madison High
2020	Sofia Carson, R3hab	"I Luv U"	I Luv U
2020	Polo G	"21"	THE GOAT
2020	Juice WRLD	"Stay High"	Legends Never Die
2020	Juice WRLD	"Anxiety - Intro"	Legends Never Die
2020	Juice WRLD	"Juice WRLD Speaks From Heaven - Outro"	Legends Never Die
2020	Juice WRLD	"Get Through It - Interlude"	Legends Never Die
2020	Juice WRLD	"The Man, The Myth, The Legend - Interlude"	Legends Never Die
2020	The Kid Laroi	"NOT FAIR (feat. Corbin)"	F*CK LOVE (SAVAGE)
2020	The Kid Laroi	"SAME THING"	F*CK LOVE (SAVAGE)
2020	The Kid Laroi	"RUNNING"	F*CK LOVE (SAVAGE)
2020	The Kid Laroi	"ERASE YOU"	F*CK LOVE (SAVAGE)
2020	The Kid Laroi	"NEED YOU THE MOST (So Sick)"	F*CK LOVE (SAVAGE)
2020	The Kid Laroi	"SELFISH"	F*CK LOVE (SAVAGE)
2020	The Kid Laroi	"PIKACHU"	F*CK LOVE (SAVAGE)
2020	The Kid Laroi	"SO DONE"	F*CK LOVE (SAVAGE)
2020	The Kid Laroi	"ALWAYS DO"	F*CK LOVE (SAVAGE)
2020	The Kid Laroi	"MAYBE"	F*CK LOVE (SAVAGE)
2020	The Kid Laroi	"TELL ME WHY"	F*CK LOVE (SAVAGE)
2020	ONEFOUR	"Home and Away"	Against All Odds
2020	ONEFOUR	"My City"	Against All Odds
2020	ONEFOUR	"Leaving"	Against All Odds
2020	ONEFOUR	"Heartless	Against All Odds
2020	ONEFOUR	"Welcome To Prison"	Single
2020	Saint Bodhi	"Gold Revolver"	Mad World
2020	Georgia Ku	"Big Plans"	REAL
2020	Spanian	"Back It Up"	"Back It Up"
2020	Spanian	"ILLCHAY"	"ILLCHAY"
2020	Spanian	"Waste Em"	"Wate Em"
2021	360Zayy	Right My Wrongs	Single
2021	Lakeyah	"Perfect"	In Due Time
2021	Sahxl	"C4"	C4
2021	Sahxl	"Demons"	C4
2021	Polo G	"Bloody Canvas"	Hall Of Fame
2021	Doja Cat	"Love To Dream"	Planet Her
2021	The Kid Laroi	"ABOUT YOU"	F*CK LOVE 3+: OVER YOU
2021	The Kid Laroi	"ATTENTION	F*CK LOVE 3+: OVER YOU
2021	The Kid Laroi	"BEST FOR ME"	F*CK LOVE 3+: OVER YOU
2021	The Kid Laroi	"SITUATION"	F*CK LOVE 3+: OVER YOU
2021	The Kid Laroi	"LONELY AND FUCKED UP"	F*CK LOVE 3+: OVER YOU
2021	The Kid Laroi	"I DON'T KNOW"	F*CK LOVE 3+: OVER YOU
2021	The Kid Laroi	"ABOUT YOU"	F*CK LOVE 3+: OVER YOU
2021	The Kid Laroi	"OVER YOU"	F*CK LOVE 3+: OVER YOU
2021	The Kid Laroi	"BAD NEWS"	F*CK LOVE 3+: OVER YOU
2021	The Kid Laroi	"NOT SOBER"	F*CK LOVE 3+: OVER YOU
2021	Polo G	"Bad Man (Smooth Criminal)"	Hall Of Fame 2.0
2026	BTS	"Aliens"	ARIRANG

== Awards and nominations ==
=== APRA Awards ===
The APRA Awards are held annually in Australia and New Zealand by the Australasian Performing Right Association to recognise songwriting skills, sales, and airplay performance by its members.

Year	Nominee / work	Award	Result	Ref.
2022	Khaled Rohaim	Breakthrough Songwriter of the Year	Nominated	
2026	"Cardio" by Larissa Lambert (Larissa Lambert / Khaled Rohaim / John Jackson / Cynthia Loving / Avital Margulies / Andre Robertson / Justin Smith / Chelsea Unger)	Most Performed R&B / Soul Work	Nominated	
