= Hall of Fame 2.0 =

Studio album (reissue) (Note: Released as part of the deluxe reissue of Polo G's third studio album Hall of Fame (2021).) by Polo G
- Released: December 3, 2021
- Length: 90:18
- Label: Columbia; ODA
- Producer: J. White Did It; Dopson

Polo G chronology
Hall of Fame (2021)	Hall of Fame 2.0 (2021)	Hood Poet (2024)

Singles from Hall of Fame 2.0
- 1. "Bad Man (Smooth Criminal)" Released: November 12, 2021

Hall of Fame 2.0 is a reissued studio album by American rapper Polo G. It was released on December 3, 2021, as the deluxe edition and sequel of his third studio album, Hall of Fame, which was released earlier in 2021. The reissued album features new guest appearances from Lil Baby, Moneybagg Yo, YungLiv, NLE Choppa, and Lil Tjay.

== Background ==
Polo G planned to release the deluxe edition of Hall of Fame in October 2021. In the same month, he announced that its deluxe edition would be a separate album, titled Hall of Fame 2.0, and would be released in a "few more weeks". On November 8, 2021, he revealed the release date of the album to be December 3, 2021, while also announcing the release date of the lead single, "Bad Man (Smooth Criminal)" for November 12, 2021. He revealed the tracklist for the reissued album on November 22, 2021. The album has been described as "a fitting title for the deluxe edition of Polo G's 2021 breakthrough album — after all, there are 14 new songs to absorb and even more new stories of the complexities of fame, making the project more a fresh version than an add-on".

== Track listing ==
Hall of Fame 2.0 track listing
No.	Title	Writer(s)	Producer(s)	Length
1.	"Bad Man (Smooth Criminal)"	Taurus Bartlett; Anthony White; Larrance Dopson; Khaled Rohaim; Michael Jackson	J. White Did It; Dopson; Rohaim; Travis Sayles	1:46
2.	"Don't Play" (featuring Lil Baby)	Bartlett; Dominique Jones; Joseph Steele; Jonathan Holder	1040; King Wizard	2:37
3.	"Start Up Again" (featuring Moneybagg Yo)	Bartlett; Demario White, Jr.; Joshua Luellen	Southside	1:49
4.	"Heating Up" (featuring YungLiv)	Bartlett; Ziare West; Sidney Reynolds; Javon Reynolds; Andre Brown; David Cabral; Master Washington	ProdByMaster; ThatSpokesman	2:23
5.	"Black Man in America"	Bartlett; Matthew Samuels; Rupert Thomas, Jr.; Cameron Molfetta	Sevn Thomas; Cameron Joseph	2:55
6.	"Young N Dumb"	Bartlett; Luellen; Simon Drab; Moritz Pomp	Southside; Simon on da Guitar; Yung Fuel	2:52
7.	"Unapologetic" (featuring NLE Choppa)	Bartlett; Bryson Potts; Luellen; Matthew-Kyle Brown	Southside; Smatt	2:48
8.	"Fortnight"	Bartlett; Ethan Hayes; Kai Hasegawa; Brian Mitchel	Haze; Kaigoingkrazy; Zuus	2:10
9.	"Decisions"	Bartlett; Danny Snodgrass, Jr.; Michael Romito; Nathan Lamarche	Taz Taylor; Census; Nash	2:39
10.	"With You"	Bartlett; Dwan Avery; Brandon Russell; Michael O'Brien; Hagan Lange	12Hunna; Bj Beatz; Hagan	2:52
11.	"Partin Ways"	Bartlett; Henry Lotas-Sherrratt; Lorenzo Merenda	Yung Cutta; Lowrenz	2:50
12.	"Suicide" (featuring Lil Tjay)	Bartlett; Tione Merritt; Bankz; Hayes; David Pointer; Iggy Börjesson; Spencer Harris	E. Bankz; Haze; Reapyy; Shoki	2:51
13.	"Piano G"	Bartlett; Darrel Jackson	Chopsquad DJ	2:59
14.	"Alright"	Bartlett; Joseph Boyden; Deaire Bowman; Te Whiti Warbrick; Georgia Boyden	SephGotTheWaves; Sickdrumz	2:29
Total length:				36:14

Hall of Fame track listing
No.	Title	Writer(s)	Producer(s)	Length
15.	"Painting Pictures"	Bartlett; Steele; Pomp	1040; Yung Fuel	2:17
16.	"Rapstar"	Bartlett; Einer Bankz; Alexander Wu; Shane Lindstrom; Ryan Vojtesak	E. Bankz; Synco	2:46
17.	"No Return" (featuring the Kid Laroi and Lil Durk)	Bartlett; Charlton Howard; Durk Banks; Snodgrass; Ryder Johnson; Mason Wu	Taz Taylor; Johnson; Wu	2:48
18.	"Toxic"	Bartlett; Harry Potter; Joel Anguita	WizardMCE; Jkei	2:11
19.	"Epidemic"	Bartlett; Tahj Vaughn; David McDowell; Sterling Reynolds; Lukas Payne	Tahj Money; DMac; Londn Blu; Karltin Bankz	2:57
20.	"Gang Gang" (with Lil Wayne)	Bartlett; Dwayne Carter, Jr.; Angelo Ferraro	Ferraro	2:59
21.	"Boom"	Bartlett; Russell; O'Brien; Campbell Rolston-Clemmer	12Hunna; Bj Beatz; Spaceman	2:06
22.	"Black Hearted"	Bartlett; Aidan Han; Michael Rasmussen	Han; Damn Mikey	3:10
23.	"Broken Guitars" (featuring Scorey)	Bartlett; Corey Ward; Potter; Daniel Magnusson	WizardMCE; Magnusson	2:08
24.	"GNF (OKOKOK)"	Bartlett; Potter; William Varanda	WizardMCE; Varohl	1:56
25.	"Go Part 1" (featuring G Herbo)	Bartlett; Herbert Wright III; Daniel Hackett	Kid Culture	2:41
26.	"Heart of a Giant" (featuring Rod Wave)	Bartlett; Rodarius Green; Rasmussen; Nick Kitchen	Damn Mikey; Kitchen	2:48
27.	"Zooted Freestyle"	Bartlett; Lathan Echols; Nicholas Mira	Lil Mosey; Nick Mira; NicoNiceWitIt	2:12
28.	"Party Lyfe" (featuring DaBaby)	Bartlett; Jonathan Kirk; Benjamin Diehl; David Mescon; Terrence Rolle	Ben Billions; Mescon; Rolle	2:51
29.	"Losses" (featuring Young Thug)	Bartlett; Jeffery Williams; Wesley Glass; Robert Richardson; Joshua Goldenberg	Wheezy; Bobby Raps; Fizzle	2:54
30.	"So Real"	Bartlett; J. Boyden; Bowman	SephGotTheWaves	2:44
31.	"Fame & Riches" (featuring Roddy Ricch)	Bartlett; Rodrick Moore, Jr.; Potter; Sébastien Jasinski	WizardMCE; LenoxBeatmaker	2:31
32.	"For the Love of New York" (with Nicki Minaj)	Bartlett; Onika Maraj; Alex Petit; Amritvir Singh; Leutrim Beqiri; Omar Gomez; Bryan Yepes	CashMoneyAP; Finesse; Byrd; Menace	2:55
33.	"Clueless" (featuring Pop Smoke and Fivio Foreign)	Bartlett; Bashar Jackson; Maxie Ryles III; Manalla Aziz	Axl Beats	2:45
34.	"Bloody Canvas"	Bartlett; Potter; Shaun Thomas; Saif Musaad; Rohaim; Patrick Bodi	WizardMCE; S.Dot; Safe	4:25
Total length:				54:04

== Charts ==
Chart performance for Hall of Fame 2.0
Chart (2021)	Peak position
Danish Albums (Hitlisten)	15
Finnish Albums (Suomen virallinen lista)	46
Irish Albums (OCC)	32
Lithuanian Albums (AGATA)	45
New Zealand Albums (RMNZ)	22
Norwegian Albums (VG-lista)	14
UK Albums (OCC)	32

== Certifications ==
Certifications for Hall of Fame 2.0
Region	Certification	Certified units/sales
New Zealand (RMNZ)	Platinum	15,000^{‡}
United Kingdom (BPI)	Silver	60,000^{‡}
^{‡} Sales+streaming figures based on certification alone.
