= TwoTiime =

Ottawa rapper and songwriter

TwoTiime خالد عمر
- Also known as: TwoTiime; TWIICE
- Born: Khalid Omar; August 25, 2001 (age 24); Ottawa, Ontario, Canada
- Origin: Mogadishu, Somalia, Africa
- Genres: Hip hop; R&B; Pop; EDM
- Occupations: Rapper; singer; songwriter; recording engineer
- Years active: 2020 - present
- Labels: Columbia Records; ODA
- Website: https://twotiime.com/

TwoTiime (born Khalid Omar) is a Canadian rapper, singer, songwriter and recording engineer from Ottawa, Ontario.

== Career ==
TwoTiime's music career began in 2019. His debut single, "Priceless," was noted for its lyrical content dealing with themes of loyalty and love.

In 2020, TwoTiime gained further recognition when he caught the attention of Chicago rapper Polo G. He later signed with Polo G’s label, ODA (Only The Dreamers Records), in collaboration with Columbia Records. This partnership was announced following the release of TwoTiime's music video for Priceless.

In January 2025, a recording studio in Los Angeles that he mainly used was destroyed by a wildfire. The studio belonged to his sound engineer, Jeffrey Wright.

=== Artistry ===
TwoTiime's music is characterized by a blend of rap and melody, with lyrics that reflect his personal narrative and the realities of street life.

== Discography ==
TwoTiime has released several singles, including "Hood Cry" and "Keep It Real," which have collectively garnered over one million views on YouTube.

His single "Hood Cry" is a tribute to the late Ottawa rapper FTG Metro who was fatally shot in January 2020.

== Personal life ==
TwoTiime has been open about the influence of his family on his career, particularly the support from his mother, who immigrated from Somalia.

In 2021, TwoTiime was charged with gun-related offences. These charges were later stayed, with his lawyer stating that there was an absence of evidence against him.
