= The Superiors =

American hip hop group

- Origin: Wyandanch, New York, U.S.
- Genres: Hip hop; R&B; pop
- Instruments: Logic Pro; Drum Machine
- Years active: 2011–2025
- Label: Capitol
- Members: S.I.D. Von

The Superiors were a father-son record production and songwriting duo from Wyandanch, New York, consisting of Sidney "S.I.D." Reynolds and Javon "Von" Reynolds. The duo has produced for notable hip-hop artists, such as Rod Wave, Lil Durk, and Polo G, with the single "Wishing for a Hero" being certified Gold by the RIAA.

== History ==
Sidney grew up in Wyandanch, New York where he met Rakim and got him influenced unto the music business. In the early '90s, he was already famous for remixing, writing, and producing on albums for Freddie Foxxx, Slick Rick, Color Me Badd, Nikki D, Zhane, and Queen Latifah. Ever since his son (Javon) was five years old, he taught him how to play the guitar, piano, drums, and Logic Pro, so music was all he knew growing up.

== Production discography ==
=== 2012 ===
Lloyd Banks - V.6: The Gift

- 03. "The Sprint"

Trav - PUSH

- "Presidential" (featuring Jim Jones and Lloyd Banks)

=== 2013 ===
Hustle Gang - Hustle Gang Presents: G.D.O.D. (Get Dough Or Die)

- 02. "Err Body" (featuring T.I., Young Dro, Trae Tha Truth, Chip, B.o.B., and Shad da God)

=== 2014 ===
SchylerChaise - "Just Us" (featuring Jimmy Kelso and Rick Ross)

Chinx - I'll Take It from Here - EP

- 04. "No Way Out"

Hustle Gang - G.D.O.D. II

- 11. "I Do The Most" (featuring Yung Booke, T.I., Young Dro, Spodee, and Shad da God)

Fabolous - The Young OG Project

- 03. "All Good" (co-produced with Detrakz)
- 05. "She Wildin'" (featuring Chris Brown)

=== 2016 ===
French Montana - MC4

- 14. "Chinx & Max / Paid For" (featuring Max B & Chinx) (co-produced with LJ Milan, Rick Steel, Harry Fraud and The Alchemist)

=== 2018 ===
Blackway - Good.Bad.Faded

- 02. "KIST"
- 04. "Bourbon Street" (co-produced with Studio Pirates)

=== 2019 ===
Polo G - Die a Legend

- 01. "Lost Files (co-produced with Detrakz and Priority Beats)

=== 2020 ===
Polo G - THE GOAT

- 16. "Wishing for a Hero" (featuring BJ the Chicago Kid) (additional production by Priority Beats and Jeff Gitty)

Various Artists - Insecure: Music From The HBO Original Series, Season 4

12. “Element” by PJ

Stunna 4 Vegas - Welcome to 4 Vegas

- 05. "Gangsta Party" (co-produced with Priority Beats)

Lil Durk - The Voice

- 15. "Lamborghini Mirrors" (featuring Booka600) (co-produced with Joe Leytrick, Jay Lv, and TouchofTrent)

=== 2021 ===
Sage The Gemini & Chris Brown - Baby

Fredo Bang - Murder Made Me

- 06. "Click Up" (co-produced with DKeyz, Figurez Made It, ProdbyBlack & Dremar Banks)

Rod Wave - SoulFly (Deluxe)

- 07. "Time Heals" (co-produced with DKeyz, MarsGawd & MalikOTB)
