= Finer Things =

Finer Things may refer to:

- "Finer Things" (DJ Felli Fel song), 2008
- "Finer Things" (Polo G song), 2018
- "Finer Things" (Post Malone song), 2024
- The Finer Things (Steve Winwood album), 1995 compilation album box
- The Finer Things (State Champs album), 2013
- "The Finer Things" (song), by Steve Winwood, 1987
