= Just Cause Y'all Waited 2 =

Studio album by Lil Durk (2020)

- Standard cover art for the album, deluxe features the same cover with a blue overlay

Studio album by Lil Durk
- Released: May 8, 2020
- Genres: Hip-hop; drill
- Length: 52:12
- Labels: Only the Family; Alamo; Geffen
- Producers: 12Hunna; Aviator Keyyz; AyeTM; Ayo Bleu; Based Kash; Cardo; Carl Paul; Cicero; DJ FMCT; Deezy; DY; ForeignGotEm; Geraldo Liive; Go Grizzly; Hagan; John Lam; JW Lucas; KidWond3r; LosTheProducer; Morgan O'Connor; Neal; Roselilah; Slider; Squat Beats; Touch of Trent; Tre Gilliam; TurnMeUpJosh; Uncle Cameron; Will A Fool; Young Cutta; YoungT

Lil Durk chronology
Family over Everything (2019)	Just Cause Y'all Waited 2 (2020)	The Voice (2020)

Singles from Just Cause Y'all Waited 2
- 1. "Turn Myself In" Released: May 31, 2019; 2. "Chiraq Demons" Released: March 20, 2020; 3. "All Love" Released: March 29, 2020; 4. "Viral Moment" Released: April 27, 2020; 5. "3 Headed Goat" Released: May 12, 2020; 6. "Gucci Gucci" Released: May 26, 2020

Professional ratings
Review scores
Source	Rating
Pitchfork	7.3/10

Just Cause Y'all Waited 2 is the fifth studio album by American rapper Lil Durk. It was released on May 8, 2020, by Only the Family, Alamo Records and Geffen Records, serving as a sequel to his 2018 Just Cause Y'all Waited mixtape. It features guest appearances from Lil Baby, Polo G, Gunna, and G Herbo. A deluxe edition of the album was released on June 26, 2020, with seven additional tracks, propelling the album to a new peak of number two on the Billboard 200.

== Commercial performance ==
Just Cause Y'all Waited 2 debuted at number five on the US Billboard 200 chart, earning 57,000 album-equivalent units (including 3,000 copies of pure album sales) in its first week. This became Lil Durk's second US top-five debut. The album also accumulated a total of 74.67 million on-demand streams of the album’s songs during the tracking week. After the release of the deluxe version, the album returned to top-ten and achieved at new peak at number two on the chart, earning 43,000 album-equivalent units. On December 17, 2020, the album was certified two-times Platinum by the Recording Industry Association of America (RIAA) for combined sales and album-equivalent units of over 2,000,000 units in the United States.

== Track listing ==
Credits adapted from Tidal.

No.	Title	Writer(s)	Producer(s)	Length
1.	"Different Meaning"	Durk Banks; Dwan Avery; Michael O'Brien; Morgan O'Connor	12Hunna; DY; Morgan O'Connor	2:31
2.	"Street Affection"	Banks; John Lam; Frank Gilliam III	Lam; Tre Gilliam	2:45
3.	"3 Headed Goat" (featuring Lil Baby and Polo G)	Banks; Dominique Jones; Taurus Bartlett; Kenneth Gilmore; Rahshan Kyles	Aviator Keyyz; Cicero	2:50
4.	"All Love"	Banks; Trenton Turner; Teun Bauhuis	Touch of Trent; YoungT	3:09
5.	"Gucci Gucci" (featuring Gunna)	Banks; Sergio Kitchens; Geraldo Mejia	Geraldo Liive	2:49
6.	"Viral Moment"	Banks; Turner; Cameron Hubler	Touch of Trent; Uncle Cameron	3:12
7.	"248"	Banks; Lam; Gilliam III	Lam; Tre Gilliam	2:36
8.	"Triflin' Hoes"	Banks; Roshwita Bacha	Roselilah	2:24
9.	"Internet Sensation"	Banks; Carl Benoit; Matino Fenelus; Elvis Milord	Carl Paul	2:06
10.	"Street Prayer"	Banks; Avery; Ronald LaTour	Cardo; DY	2:39
11.	"Chiraq Demons" (featuring G Herbo)	Banks; Herbert Wright III; Dequin Ramey	TheKidDeezy	2:54
12.	"Doing Too Much"	Banks; Bacha; John Lucas; Carlos Goodwin, Jr.	Roselilah; JW Lucas; LosTheProducer	1:42
13.	"Broke Up in Miami"	Banks; Turner; Hagan Lange; Scott Slider	Touch of Trent; Hagan; Slider	2:29
14.	"Turn Myself In"	Banks; Kevin Price; Julius Rivera III; Joshua Samuel	Go Grizzly; Squat Beats; TurnMeUpJosh	3:12
15.	"Fabricated"	Banks; Anthony Beechan; Avery; O'Brien	12Hunna; DY; KidWond3r	2:33
Total length:				39:51

Deluxe bonus tracks
No.	Title	Writer(s)	Producer(s)	Length
16.	"Pass the Water"	Banks; Thomas Sanders; Vid Vucenovic	Based Kash; ForeignGotEm	2:00
17.	"Denied in UK"	Banks; Maliki Decampos	DJ FMCT	2:21
18.	"Support You"	Banks; Thomas Moore	AyeTM	2:09
19.	"When We Shoot"	Banks; Samuel; Henry Lotas-Sherratt	TurnMeUpJosh; Young Cutta	2:58
20.	"Where They Go"	Banks; Samuel	TurnMeUpJosh	2:44
21.	"Watch Yo Homie"	Banks; Lam; Gilliam III	Lam; Tre Gilliam	2:31
22.	"Outro"	Banks; William Byrd; Cornelius Williams	Will A Fool; Neal	1:56
Total length:				52:12

== Personnel ==
Credits adapted from Genius, Muso.Ai & Tidal

Technical

- Nick Rice – Recording
- Willie Beamin – Recording
- Darth Moon – Recording
- TurnMeUpJosh – Mixing, Mastering

== Charts ==
=== Weekly charts ===
Chart performance for Just Cause Y'all Waited 2
Chart (2020)	Peak position
Canadian Albums (Billboard)	20
UK Albums (Official Charts)	32
US Billboard 200	2
US Top R&B/Hip-Hop Albums (Billboard)	2
US Top Rap Albums (Billboard)	2

Chart performance for Just Cause Y'all Waited 2
Chart (2023)	Peak position
Nigeria Top 50 Albums (TurnTable)	47

=== Year-end charts ===
2020 year-end chart performance for Just Cause Y'all Waited 2
Chart (2020)	Position
US Billboard 200	69
US Top R&B/Hip-Hop Albums (Billboard)	39

2021 year-end chart performance for Just Cause Y'all Waited 2
Chart (2021)	Position
US Billboard 200	77
US Top R&B/Hip-Hop Albums (Billboard)	58

== Certifications ==
Region	Certification	Certified units/sales
United Kingdom (BPI)	Gold	100,000^{‡}
United States (RIAA)	2× Platinum	2,000,000^{‡}
^{‡} Sales+streaming figures based on certification alone.
