= Go Stupid =

2020 song by Polo G, Stunna 4 Vegas, NLE Choppa featuring Mike Will Made It

Single by Polo G, Stunna 4 Vegas and NLE Choppa featuring Mike Will Made It

from the album The Goat
- Released: February 14, 2020
- Genre: Hip hop
- Length: 2:46
- Label: Columbia
- Songwriters: Taurus Bartlett; Khalick Caldwell; Bryson Potts; Michael Williams II; Brytavious Chambers
- Producers: Mike Will Made It; Tay Keith

Polo G singles chronology
"First Place" (2020)	"Go Stupid" (2020)	"DND" (2020)

Stunna 4 Vegas singles chronology
"Change My Life" (2020)	"Go Stupid" (2020)	"Freestyle" (2020)

NLE Choppa singles chronology
"Exotic" (2020)	"Go Stupid" (2020)	"100 Shots" (2020)

Mike Will Made It singles chronology
"Valentine" (2020)	"Go Stupid" (2020)	"Bang Bang" (2020)

Music video
- Go Stupid" on YouTube

"Go Stupid" is a song by American rappers Polo G, Stunna 4 Vegas, and NLE Choppa featuring American record producer Mike Will Made It, who produced the song alongside late American record producer Tay Keith. It was released on February 14, 2020, as the lead single from Polo G's second studio album The Goat. The song went viral on social media including video sharing app TikTok.

The track debuted and peaked at number 60 on the US Billboard Hot 100, making it the second Hot 100 entry for Polo G and Stunna 4 Vegas, and the fourth for NLE Choppa.

== Background ==
The track was first announced in an Instagram post by Polo G on February 7, 2020. A snippet of the track was later posted on Polo's Instagram account on February 12, two days before the release of the track.

== Composition ==
The song has no chorus, instead finding all three rappers "ripping up" a Mike Will Made-It and Tay Keith beat, going verse to verse in order of the rappers credited. Polo G raps about his beginnings and uses NBA references ("Before all of this rap shit, I was gangbangin' and doin' high speeds on the cops and shit / And I'm straight from the Chi, but I ball like a king up in Cali and shoot like Stojaković").

== Critical reception ==
Polo G has received particular praise for his verse. Alex Zidel of HotNewHipHop said that Polo G "continued to prove that he can rap his ass off", and that he had "fast-paced bars". Jessica McKinney of Complex called the song a "rowdy club record".

== TikTok tutorials ==
The song has become popular on video-sharing app TikTok where people use it to create viral tutorials in a virtual classroom. These videos draw inspiration from the song's official music video, which is set in a high school.

== Music video ==
The music video for the track was released on February 14, 2020. It was directed by Michael Garcia, with the video concept by Jamicheal Thomas. It features all three rappers partying and dancing at a high school.

== In popular culture ==
"Go Stupid" appears on the NBA 2K21 video game soundtrack.

== Charts ==
Chart (2020)	Peak position
Canada Hot 100 (Billboard)	28
Ireland (IRMA)	97
New Zealand Hot Singles (RMNZ)	16
US Billboard Hot 100	60
US Hot R&B/Hip-Hop Songs (Billboard)	29
US Rolling Stone Top 100	33

== Certifications ==
Region	Certification	Certified units/sales
Canada (Music Canada)	3× Platinum	240,000^{‡}
Denmark (IFPI Danmark)	Gold	45,000^{‡}
New Zealand (RMNZ)	Gold	15,000^{‡}
United Kingdom (BPI)	Silver	200,000^{‡}
United States (RIAA)	4× Platinum	4,000,000^{‡}
^{‡} Sales+streaming figures based on certification alone.
