= Bad Man (Smooth Criminal) =

2021 single by Polo G

Single by Polo G

from the album Hall of Fame 2.0
- Released: November 12, 2021
- Genre: Trap
- Length: 1:46
- Label: Columbia
- Songwriters: Taurus Bartlett; Anthony White; Larrance Dopson; Khaled Rohaim; Michael Jackson
- Producers: J. White Did It; Dopson

Polo G singles chronology
| "Jumpin" (2021) | "Bad Man (Smooth Criminal)" (2021) |

Music video
- "Bad Man (Smooth Criminal)" on YouTube

"Bad Man (Smooth Criminal)" is a song by American rapper Polo G. It was released through Columbia Records on November 12, 2021, as the only single and opening track from his reissued album, Hall of Fame 2.0. The song is an interpolation of American singer Michael Jackson's single, "Smooth Criminal", taken from his seventh studio album, Bad (1987). It was produced by J. White Did It and Larrance Dopson, while it was co-produced by Khaled Rohaim and Travis Sayles.

== Background and promotion ==
In October 2021, Polo G debuted the song at Rolling Loud to an average to negative reception from fans. He confirmed the release of the song and its parent album, Hall of Fame 2.0, on November 8, 2021.

== Music video ==
A music video premiered along with the song on November 12, 2021. He wears the same white suit that Michael Jackson wore in the video of "Smooth Criminal" to pay homage to the late singer. At the end of the video, a written statement by Polo G appears, which says:

To the family, friends and fans of Michael Jackson and his estate, We are truly grateful for all your support in the release of this song and music video. MJ is loved all around the world. We used this opportunity to represent this song for the future. We thank you sincerely and we hope we have contributed our small part to the everlasting memory and legend of the greatest entertainer of all time.

== Charts ==
=== Weekly charts ===
Chart performance for "Bad Man (Smooth Criminal)"
| Chart (2021–2022) | Peak position |
|---|---|
| Australia (ARIA) | 48 |
| Canada Hot 100 (Billboard) | 39 |
| Global 200 (Billboard) | 58 |
| Iceland (Tónlistinn) | 20 |
| Ireland (IRMA) | 37 |
| Netherlands (Single Top 100) | 93 |
| New Zealand Hot Singles (RMNZ) | 7 |
| Sweden Heatseeker (Sverigetopplistan) | 3 |
| UK Singles (Official Charts) | 47 |
| UK Hip Hop/R&B (Official Charts) | 17 |
| US Billboard Hot 100 | 49 |
| US Hot R&B/Hip-Hop Songs (Billboard) | 10 |
| US Rhythmic Airplay (Billboard) | 12 |

=== Year-end charts ===
2022 year-end chart performance for "Bad Man (Smooth Criminal)"
| Chart (2022) | Position |
|---|---|
| US Hot R&B/Hip-Hop Songs (Billboard) | 75 |
| US Rhythmic (Billboard) | 50 |

== Certifications ==
Certifications for "Bad Man (Smooth Criminal)"
| Region | Certification | Certified units/sales |
|---|---|---|
| New Zealand (RMNZ) | Gold | 15,000^{‡} |
| United States (RIAA) | Platinum | 1,000,000^{‡} |
^{‡} Sales+streaming figures based on certification alone.

== Release history ==
Release dates and formats for "Bad Man (Smooth Criminal)"
| Region | Date | Format(s) | Label | Ref. |
|---|---|---|---|---|
| Various | November 12, 2021 | Digital download; streaming | Columbia | |
| United States | November 23, 2021 | Rhythmic contemporary radio | Columbia | |
| United States | November 23, 2021 | Urban contemporary radio | Columbia | |
| Italy | December 3, 2021 | Contemporary hit radio | Sony | |
