= 3 Headed Goat =

2020 single by Lil Durk featuring Lil Baby and Polo G

Single by Lil Durk featuring Lil Baby and Polo G

from the album Just Cause Y'all Waited 2
- Released: May 7, 2020
- Genre: Trap
- Length: 2:49
- Label: Only the Family; Alamo; Geffen
- Songwriters: Durk Banks; Dominique Jones; Taurus Bartlett; Rahshan Kyles; Kenneth Gilmore
- Producers: Aviator Keyyz; Cicero

Lil Durk singles chronology
"Viral Moment" (2020)	"3 Headed Goat" (2020)	"Gucci Gucci" (2020)

Lil Baby singles chronology
"All In" (2020)	"3 Headed Goat" (2020)	"Prospect" (2020)

Polo G singles chronology
"DND" (2020)	"3 Headed Goat" (2020)	"Wishing for a Hero" (2020)

Music video
- "3 Headed Goat" on YouTube

"3 Headed Goat" is a song by American rapper Lil Durk featuring fellow American rappers Lil Baby and Polo G. It was released on May 7, 2020, as the third single from the former's fifth studio album Just Cause Y'all Waited 2 (2020), a day ahead of the album's release. On the song, the rappers combine to form a "3 headed G.O.A.T." (an acronym for "Greatest of All Time"). The track received positive reviews from critics and was Durk's highest-charting song until the release of Drake's "Laugh Now Cry Later".

"3 Headed Goat" debuted and peaked at number 43 on the US Billboard Hot 100 chart, and also reached numbers 13 and 15 on both the Rolling Stone Top 100 and US Billboard Hot R&B/Hip-Hop Songs charts respectively. It was certified platinum by the Recording Industry Association of America (RIAA), denoting sales of over one million units in that country. The song also charted in Canada and New Zealand, reaching numbers 77 and 38 respectively. The accompanying music video for the single, directed by Cole Bennett, features all three artists handling large currency in a warehouse.

== Background ==
Lil Durk explained to Apple Music how the song's conception came about and why he decided to include Polo G: "Me and Lil Baby was in the studio and we did not finish the song. So I had the song on my hard drive. And my hard drive crashed. I didn't have no sessions, only had [what I had recorded on my] phone and a little bit of the beat left playing. And then I just decided Polo G going crazy right now. I got to put Polo on there". To celebrate the song and his second studio album, The Goat, which was released on May 15, 2020, Polo G purchased a "3 Headed Goat" diamond piece.

== Composition ==
Uproxx's Aaron Williams noted how the song finds the three rappers "snapping off aggressive verses over a bass-heavy, high-speed beat". Lil Baby performs the chorus, while Durk and Polo fill their verses with "brass knuckled punchlines".

== Critical reception ==
Sam Mizzah of The Source applauded the rappers' chemistry: "The intertwining of these three together on a track is a smooth and natural fit, complementing the beat well and proving to be well-received by fans". Both Joshua Espinoza of Complex and KarenCivil.com's Ariel Whitely called the track a "standout" from Just Cause Y'all Waited 2. Uproxx's Aaron Williams praised the lyrics: "The three rappers pass a duffle bag full of lyrics as each takes their turn blazing through their rapid-fire verses [...]". Rosario Harper of SOHH called the track a "must-hear" banger. XXL's Robby Seabrook III named it among the best new songs of the week. Reviewing the song's parent album, Pitchfork's Dean Van Nguyen said the song lives up to its audacious billing.

== Chart performance ==
On the week of May 23, 2020, "3 Headed Goat" debuted and peaked at number 43 on the Billboard Hot 100. It stayed on the chart for sixteen weeks. The single also reached numbers 13 and 15 on both the Rolling Stone Top 100 and the US Hot R&B/Hip-Hop Songs charts respectively. On March 27, 2025, the single was certified 4× platinum by the Recording Industry Association of America (RIAA) for combined sales and streaming units of over four million units in the US.

In Canada, the track debuted and peaked at number 77 on the Canadian Hot 100 the same week it first appeared on the Billboard Hot 100.

== Music video ==
The song's official video was released on June 25, 2020, coinciding with the release of the deluxe edition of Just Cause Y'all Waited 2. It was directed by Cole Bennett, premiering through his Lyrical Lemonade channel. The video sees the artists in and around a warehouse, handling large currency. Lil Durk is seen near a CGI three-headed goat, which, according to Revolt's Jon Powell, was a presumed reference to the rappers' "current status in the upper echelons of hip hop". The video garnered over 500,000 views in its first 90 minutes.

=== Response ===
Sam Mizzah of The Source called the video "excellently directed and edited", complimenting director Cole Bennett's "textbook flavor", stating he continues to cement Lyrical Lemonade as "true tastemakers of the now". Uproxx's Aaron Williams noted the high-speed energy, calling the visuals "trippy".

== Charts ==
=== Weekly charts ===
Chart (2020)	Peak position
Canada Hot 100 (Billboard)	77
New Zealand Hot Singles (RMNZ)	38
US Billboard Hot 100	43
US Hot R&B/Hip-Hop Songs (Billboard)	15
US Rolling Stone Top 100	13

=== Year-end charts ===
Chart (2020)	Position
US Hot R&B/Hip-Hop Songs (Billboard)	70

== Certifications ==
Region	Certification	Certified units/sales
New Zealand (RMNZ)	Gold	15,000^{‡}
United Kingdom (BPI)	Silver	200,000^{‡}
United States (RIAA)	4× Platinum	4,000,000^{‡}
^{‡} Sales+streaming figures based on certification alone.
