= DND (song) =

2020 single by Polo G

Single by Polo G

from the album The Goat
- Released: April 10, 2020
- Length: 3:00
- Label: Columbia
- Songwriters: Taurus Bartlett; Dewayne Kennemer; Jack Jarves
- Producers: WayneOnABeat; J3

Polo G singles chronology
"Pricetag" (2020)	"DND" (2020)	"3 Headed Goat" (2020)

Music video
- "DND" on YouTube

"DND" ("Do Not Disturb") is a song by American rapper Polo G, released on April 10, 2020 as the third single from his second studio album The Goat (2020). It was produced by WayneOnABeat.

== Composition ==
Lake Schatz of Consequence of Sound describes the song as Polo G "shutting out the world and nearly drowning in his own dark thoughts". Lyrically, the song finds him "muttering sadly" about "assorted bad feelings" such as isolation and betrayal. He sing-raps: "Snakes in the grass, watch out for rats and all the feline / I cut everybody off, keep hittin' decline / I swear these painkillers got me on the deep vibe / Miss the old days, got me wishin' I could rewind."

== Music video ==
A music video was released alongside the single and directed by Jordan Wozy. It opens with Polo G putting his phone on "Do Not Disturb" and counting money. He is "cooped up in an empty house", and takes a "solo nighttime drive" as well.

== Charts ==
Chart performance for "DND"
Chart (2020)	Peak position
New Zealand Hot Singles (RMNZ)	33
US Billboard Hot 100	84
US Hot R&B/Hip-Hop Songs (Billboard)	37

== Certifications ==
Certifications for "DND"
Region	Certification	Certified units/sales
United States (RIAA)	Platinum	1,000,000^{‡}
^{‡} Sales+streaming figures based on certification alone.
