= Flex (Polo G song) =

2020 song by Polo G

Song by Polo G featuring Juice Wrld

from the album The Goat
- Released: May 15, 2020
- Recorded: July 15, 2019
- Length: 2:43
- Label: Columbia
- Songwriters: Taurus Bartlett; Jarad Higgins; Chauncey Hollis; Chris Madine; Dustin Corbett
- Producers: Hit-Boy; Corbett (co.)

"Flex" is a song by American rapper Polo G featuring fellow American rapper Juice WRLD from the former's second studio album The Goat (2020). The track was written by the artists alongside Chris Madine, producer Hit-Boy, and co-producer Dustin Corbett.

== Background ==
In an interview with HotNewHipHop shortly before the release of The Goat, Polo G stated that he and Juice Wrld used to "link up" together when they were in California. He added that when he recorded the song with Hit-Boy, he left an open verse and Hit-Boy brought Juice Wrld to record a verse. In another interview with Complex, he said that the song had the feature he was most excited for on the album.

== Composition ==
The song contains melodic production in the form of an "emotive" pop beat, and boastful lyrics from the rappers regarding their lifestyles.

== Critical reception ==
The song received generally positive reviews, with particular praise on Juice Wrld's feature. Fred Thomas of AllMusic wrote that he adds "even more gravity" to the song's beat. Writing for HipHopDX, Eric Diep regarded Juice Wrld's verse as one of his best.

== Charts ==
Chart performance for "Flex"
Chart (2020)	Peak position
Canada Hot 100 (Billboard)	60
Ireland (IRMA)	75
New Zealand Hot Singles (RMNZ)	8
UK Singles (OCC)	91
US Billboard Hot 100	30
US Hot R&B/Hip-Hop Songs (Billboard)	14

== Certifications ==
Certifications for "Flex"
Region	Certification	Certified units/sales
Canada (Music Canada)	3× Platinum	240,000^{‡}
New Zealand (RMNZ)	Gold	15,000^{‡}
United Kingdom (BPI)	Silver	200,000^{‡}
United States (RIAA)	4× Platinum	4,000,000^{‡}
^{‡} Sales+streaming figures based on certification alone.
