= Pop Out =

2019 single by Polo G featuring Lil Tjay

Single by Polo G featuring Lil Tjay

from the album Die a Legend
- Released: February 1, 2019
- Length: 2:46
- Label: Columbia
- Songwriters: Taurus Bartlett; Tione Merritt; Dylan Berg; João Duarte
- Producers: Iceberg; JD on tha Track

Polo G singles chronology
"Battle Cry" (2019)	"Pop Out" (2019)	"Deep Wounds" (2019)

Music video
- "Pop Out" on YouTube

"Pop Out" is a song by American rapper Polo G featuring fellow American rapper Lil Tjay. The single was released on February 1, 2019, by Columbia Records as the third single for the former's debut album, Die a Legend (2019). The music video for the song was released prior on January 13. The song reached number 11 on the US Billboard Hot 100.

== Critical reception ==
Billboard magazine called the song a "hard-nosed anthem". The magazine also ranked it 45th on their 100 Best Songs of 2019 list.

== Commercial performance ==
"Pop Out" debuted at number 95 on the US Billboard Hot 100, becoming both Polo G and Lil Tjay's first chart entry. It peaked at number 11 on the chart. On March 23, 2020, the single was certified quadruple platinum by the Recording Industry Association of America (RIAA) for combined sales and streaming data of over four million copies in the United States.

== Remixes ==
"Pop Out Again"

Single by Polo G featuring Lil Baby and Gunna

from the album Die a Legend
- Released: June 7, 2019
- Length: 3:45
- Label: Columbia
- Songwriters: Taurus Bartlett; Dominique Jones; Sergio Kitchens; Dylan Berg; João Duarte
- Producers: Iceberg; JD on tha Track

Music video
- "Pop Out Again" on YouTube

The official sequel of the song, titled "Pop Out Again", was released on June 7, 2019, when Polo G's album released. Lil Tjay's verse is replaced with verses by American rappers and frequent collaborators Lil Baby and Gunna. Polo G also has a different verse from the original.

On July 7, 2019, Canadian rapper Tory Lanez released an unofficial remix through his YouTube channel.

== Charts ==
=== Weekly charts ===
Chart (2019)	Peak position
Australia (ARIA)	73
Belgium (Ultratip Bubbling Under Flanders)	21
Canada Hot 100 (Billboard)	12
Denmark (Tracklisten)	36
Ireland (IRMA)	61
Portugal (AFP)	73
Sweden (Sverigetopplistan)	87
UK Singles (OCC)	41
US Billboard Hot 100	11
US Hot R&B/Hip-Hop Songs (Billboard)	7
US Rhythmic Airplay (Billboard)	9
US Rolling Stone Top 100	22

=== Year-end charts ===
Chart (2019)	Position
Canada (Canadian Hot 100)	37
US Billboard Hot 100	45
US Hot R&B/Hip-Hop Songs (Billboard)	22
US Rhythmic (Billboard)	45
US Rolling Stone Top 100	36

== Certifications ==
Region	Certification	Certified units/sales
Australia (ARIA)	Gold	35,000^{‡}
Canada (Music Canada)	9× Platinum	720,000^{‡}
Denmark (IFPI Danmark)	Platinum	90,000^{‡}
New Zealand (RMNZ)	Platinum	30,000^{‡}
Poland (ZPAV)	Gold	25,000^{‡}
United Kingdom (BPI)	Platinum	600,000^{‡}
United States (RIAA)	9× Platinum	9,000,000^{‡}
^{‡} Sales+streaming figures based on certification alone.

== Release history ==
Region	Date	Format	Label	Ref.
Various	February 1, 2019	Digital download	Columbia	
United States	March 26, 2019	Rhythmic contemporary	Columbia	
