= Bag Talk =

2022 single by Polo G

Single by Polo G
- Released: October 28, 2022
- Recorded: February 2022
- Genre: Drill
- Length: 2:27
- Label: Columbia
- Songwriters: Taurus Bartlett; Joshua Luellen; Bryan Simmons
- Producers: Southside; TM88

Polo G singles chronology
"Bottle Girls" (2022)	"Bag Talk" (2022)	"Red Dead" (2022)

Music video
- "Bag Talk" on YouTube

"Bag Talk" is a song by American rapper Polo G, released on October 28, 2022, alongside a music video. It was produced by Southside and TM88.

== Background ==
In an interview with Rolling Stone, Polo G stated he made the song around February 2022, during studio sessions with Southside.

== Composition ==
"Bag Talk" is a drill song, in which Polo G raps about street life and his origins, combining elements of his introspective and blustery rapping styles.

== Music video ==
The music video was directed by Caleb Jermale. It opens with Polo G and his friends roaming in their stomping grounds in Chicago. Polo is then seen at a jewelry store and on a private jet.

== Charts ==
Chart performance for "Bag Talk"
Chart (2022)	Peak position
New Zealand Hot Singles (RMNZ)	20
US Bubbling Under Hot 100 (Billboard)	7
US Hot R&B/Hip-Hop Songs (Billboard)	41
