= Heartless (Polo G song) =

2019 single by Polo G

Single by Polo G featuring Mustard

from the album The Goat
- Released: September 20, 2019
- Length: 3:24
- Label: Columbia
- Songwriters: Taurus Bartlett; Dijon McFarlane; Shah Rukh Zaman Khan
- Producers: Mustard; GYLTTRYP

Polo G singles chronology
"Forever" (2019)	"Heartless" (2019)	"Marvelous" (2019)

Mustard singles chronology
"Ballin'" (2019)	"Heartless" (2019)	"Big Shot" (2019)

Music video
- "Heartless" on YouTube

"Heartless" is a song by American rapper Polo G, released on September 20, 2019 by Columbia Records. The song features American record producer Mustard, who produced the track, and is the lead single from Polo G's second studio album The Goat (2020).

== Composition ==
The song features a guitar loop, as well as an uptempo "trap-dipped blues rhythm". It finds Polo G singing about his past struggles, including that of his family and his activities in the streets, his rise to success, and staying true to his roots.

== Music video ==
A music video directed by Ryan Lynch was released alongside the single. It sees Polo G in Chicago with his friends as he raps, while "glitchy graphics, fire strips, and lyrics" appear around him.

In April 2022, after the video had passed 100 million views on YouTube, Polo G revealed on Instagram that he almost died of a drug overdose before the video shoot.

== Charts ==
Chart (2019–20)	Peak position
US Bubbling Under Hot 100 (Billboard)	3

== Certifications ==
Region	Certification	Certified units/sales
Canada (Music Canada)	2× Platinum	160,000^{‡}
New Zealand (RMNZ)	Gold	15,000^{‡}
United Kingdom (BPI)	Silver	200,000^{‡}
United States (RIAA)	3× Platinum	3,000,000^{‡}
^{‡} Sales+streaming figures based on certification alone.
