= Nick & Knight Tour =

2014 concert tour by Nick Carter and Jordan Knight

- Tour by Nick Carter and Jordan Knight
- Promotional poster for tour
- Associated album: Nick & Knight
- Start date: September 15, 2014
- End date: November 22, 2014
- Legs: 1
- No. of shows: 38 in North America

The Nick & Knight Tour was a co-headlining tour by American recording artists Nick Carter and Jordan Knight. The tour supported their collaborative studio album, Nick & Knight. The tour began September 2014 in Nashville, Tennessee and played over 30 shows in the United States and Canada.

== Background ==
According to Knight, the two spoke of a possible collaboration during their time with supergroup NKOTBSB. Initially, the two were planning to conduct a co-headlining tour, promoting previous and forthcoming solo projects. After the 2011-12 tour, they decided to collaborate on a single, which eventually grew into Knight and Carter completing an entire album.

In April 2014, the duo made an appearance on the American morning show, Good Morning America. During the appearance, they announced their single, album and tour. The show has been described as a big party. Despite being performed in nightclubs and theatres, each show will possess the energy of an arena gig. The two will perform songs from their new album, alongside their solo hits. A homage to boy bands will be performed, as well as a tribute to music that has inspired both Carter and Knight.

== Opening act ==
- Mix Master Wood

== Set list ==
This set list was obtained from the September 24, 2014 concert in Minneapolis, at Mill City Nights. It does not represent all concerts during the tour.

1. "Nobody Better"
2. "Burning Up" / "Let's Go Higher
3. "Just the Two of Us" (contains elements of "It Takes Two")
4. "Take Me Home"
5. "Instrumental Sequence"
6. "Halfway There"
7. "If You Go Away"
8. "Paper"
9. "Drive My Car"
10. "Easy Lover" / "Addicted to Love"
11. "If You Want It to Be Good Girl (Get Yourself a Bad Boy)" / "No Diggity" / "Gettin' Jiggy wit It"/ "Hip Hop Hooray" / "Jump" / "Creep" / "Thong Song" / "Pony"
12. "Switch"
13. "Deja Vu"
14. "If You Want It"
15. "Instrumental Sequence"
16. "One More Time" (Carter solo)
17. "Give It to You" (Knight solo)
18. "You Got It (The Right Stuff)" / "Larger than Life"

== Tour dates ==
Date	City	Country	Venue
North America
September 15, 2014	Nashville	United States	Cannery Ballroom
September 17, 2014	Louisville	United States	Mercury Ballroom
September 19, 2014	Cincinnati	United States	Bogart's
September 20, 2014	Indianapolis	United States	Murat Theatre
September 21, 2014	St. Louis	United States	Pageant Concert NightClub
September 23, 2014	Kansas City	United States	Folly Theater
September 24, 2014	Minneapolis	United States	Mill City Nights
September 26, 2014	Chicago	United States	House of Blues
September 27, 2014	Chicago	United States	House of Blues
September 28, 2014	Royal Oak	United States	Royal Oak Music Theatre
September 30, 2014	Cleveland	United States	Agora Theatre and Ballroom
October 1, 2014	Pittsburgh	United States	Byham Theater
October 3, 2014	Montreal	Canada	Métropolis
October 4, 2014	Toronto	Canada	Sound Academy
October 5, 2014	Toronto	Canada	Sound Academy
October 8, 2014	Boston	United States	Colonial Theatre
October 10, 2014	New York City	United States	Best Buy Theater
October 11, 2014	Philadelphia	United States	Trocadero Theatre
October 12, 2014	Philadelphia	United States	Trocadero Theatre
October 14, 2014	Atlanta	United States	The Loft
October 15, 2014	Charlotte	United States	The Fillmore Charlotte
October 17, 2014	Baltimore	United States	Baltimore Soundstage
October 18, 2014	Richmond	United States	National Theater
October 19, 2014	Charleston	United States	Charleston Music Hall
October 21, 2014	Orlando	United States	Plaza Live Theatre
October 22, 2014	Fort Lauderdale	United States	Revolution Live
November 4, 2014	New Orleans	United States	Civic Theatre
November 5, 2014	Dallas	United States	House of Blues
November 7, 2014	Houston	United States	House of Blues
November 9, 2014	Phoenix	United States	Orpheum Theatre
November 11, 2014	San Diego	United States	House of Blues
November 13, 2014	Las Vegas	United States	House of Blues
November 14, 2014	West Hollywood	United States	House of Blues
November 15, 2014	Anaheim	United States	House of Blues
November 18, 2014	San Francisco	United States	Regency Ballroom
November 20, 2014	Seattle	United States	Showbox SoDo
November 21, 2014	Vancouver	Canada	Vogue Theatre
November 22, 2014	Calgary	Canada	Flames Central

=== Box office score data ===
Venue	City	Tickets sold / Available	Gross revenue
Mill City Nights	Minneapolis	539 / 1,087 (50%)	$23,392
Royal Oak Music Theatre	Royal Oak	704 / 1,200 (59%)	$28,860
