= Through da Storm =

Song by Polo G

Song by Polo G

from the album Die a Legend
- Released: June 7, 2019
- Length: 3:15
- Label: Columbia
- Songwriters: Taurus Bartlett; Jahmere Tylon
- Producer: Ayo

"Through da Storm" is a song by American rapper Polo G from his debut studio album Die a Legend (2019). It was produced by Ayo.

== Critical reception ==
Tosten Burks of Spin regarded "Through da Storm" as perhaps the best track from Die a Legend.

== Music video ==
The music video was directed by Ryan Lynch and released on July 14, 2019. In it, Polo G performs in front of a group of ballerinas and a fountain in a park in Los Angeles. Shots of the streets of L.A. at night and the California mountains are also included.

== Charts ==
Chart (2019)	Peak position
US Bubbling Under Hot 100 (Billboard)	25

== Certifications ==
Region	Certification	Certified units/sales
Canada (Music Canada)	2× Platinum	160,000^{‡}
Denmark (IFPI Danmark)	Gold	45,000^{‡}
New Zealand (RMNZ)	Gold	15,000^{‡}
United Kingdom (BPI)	Gold	400,000^{‡}
United States (RIAA)	3× Platinum	3,000,000^{‡}
^{‡} Sales+streaming figures based on certification alone.
