= 21 (Polo G song) =

2020 song by Polo G

Song by Polo G

from the album The Goat
- Released: May 15, 2020
- Length: 2:43
- Label: Columbia
- Songwriters: Taurus Bartlett; Keanu Dean Torres; Khaled Rohaim
- Producers: Keanu Beats; Rohaim

Music video
- "21" on YouTube

"21" is a song by American rapper Polo G from his second studio album The Goat (2020). It was produced by Keanu Beats and Khaled Rohaim. The house in which the music-video got filmed at was in the Pariserstraße 4.

== Composition ==
The song has been described as "808-heavy". It features two verses from Polo G, who sings about his old life in the streets and his new life and fame, as a celebration of his 21st birthday. Additionally, he talks about his drug use, citing the death of his friend Juice Wrld as motivating him to not relapse on drugs.

== Music video ==
The official music video was directed by Cole Bennett and released on June 15, 2020. It opens with a hooded gunman who shoots at Polo G as he wakes up in his room. Polo walks through a drug house, a prison and the hallways of a backlot, while the unseen attacker follows and periodically fires at him. Objects levitate around the Polo, and Juice Wrld also makes a small cameo in the video. The video ends with the shooter removing his hood and revealing to be Polo G himself, who then grows horns resembling that of the Devil beneath his dreadlocks.

== Charts ==
Chart performance for "21"
Chart (2020)	Peak position
Canada Hot 100 (Billboard)	86
Ireland (IRMA)	82
US Billboard Hot 100	62
US Hot R&B/Hip-Hop Songs (Billboard)	27

== Certifications ==
Certifications for "21"
Region	Certification	Certified units/sales
Canada (Music Canada)	Platinum	80,000^{‡}
Denmark (IFPI Danmark)	Gold	45,000^{‡}
New Zealand (RMNZ)	Platinum	30,000^{‡}
United Kingdom (BPI)	Gold	400,000^{‡}
United States (RIAA)	4× Platinum	4,000,000^{‡}
^{‡} Sales+streaming figures based on certification alone.
