= Martin & Gina =

Single by Polo G

Single by Polo G

from the album The Goat
- Released: August 13, 2020
- Length: 2:12
- Label: Columbia
- Songwriters: Taurus Bartlett; Hagan Lange; Kyre Trask; Beau Glaser; Tahj Vaughn
- Producers: Hagan; KDubb; BG SOUNDZ; Tahj Money

Polo G singles chronology
"Purple" (2020)	"Martin & Gina" (2020)	"BookBag 2.0" (2020)

Music video
- "Martin & Gina" on YouTube

"Martin & Gina" is a song by American rapper Polo G from his second studio album The Goat (2020). It was released as the album's fifth single and its music video was released on August 13, 2020. In the song, Polo G compares his relationship with a girl to that of Martin Payne and Gina Waters in the sitcom Martin, and talks about how it has improved despite clashes.

== Music video ==
The music video was directed by the Reel Goats and pays tribute to Martin. Polo G plays the titular character, while Gina is played by comedian and rapper Pretty Vee. Polo reproduces scenes from Martin with Vee.

== Live performances ==
On September 21, 2020, Polo G performed the song on The Tonight Show Starring Jimmy Fallon.

== Charts ==
=== Weekly charts ===
Weekly chart performance for "Martin & Gina"
Chart (2020–2021)	Peak position
Australia (ARIA)	42
Canada (Canadian Hot 100)	52
Global 200 (Billboard)	107
Ireland (IRMA)	32
New Zealand Hot Singles (RMNZ)	23
Portugal (AFP)	196
Sweden (Sverigetopplistan)	79
UK Singles (OCC)	48
UK Hip Hop/R&B (OCC)	18
US Billboard Hot 100	61
US Hot R&B/Hip-Hop Songs (Billboard)	22
US Rolling Stone Top 100	30

=== Year-end charts ===
2020 year-end chart performance for "Martin & Gina"
Chart (2020)	Position
US Hot R&B/Hip-Hop Songs (Billboard)	90

2021 year-end chart performance for "Martin & Gina"
Chart (2021)	Position
Australia (ARIA)	70

== Certifications ==
Certifications for "Martin & Gina"
Region	Certification	Certified units/sales
Australia (ARIA)	2× Platinum	140,000^{‡}
Canada (Music Canada)	7× Platinum	560,000^{‡}
Denmark (IFPI Danmark)	Platinum	90,000^{‡}
Italy (FIMI)	Gold	50,000^{‡}
New Zealand (RMNZ)	2× Platinum	60,000^{‡}
Poland (ZPAV)	Gold	25,000^{‡}
United Kingdom (BPI)	Platinum	600,000^{‡}
United States (RIAA)	7× Platinum	7,000,000^{‡}
^{‡} Sales+streaming figures based on certification alone.
