= Juto =

American Singer and songwriter

- Born: Jarius Gay; 1998 (age 27–28); Springfield, Missouri, U.S.
- Genres: R&B; pop
- Occupations: Singer, songwriter
- Years active: 2015–present
- Label: RE7AX Records / COR/TAN RECORDS

Jarius Gay (born 1998), known professionally as Juto, is an American singer and songwriter born in Springfield, Missouri, raised in Gwinnett, Georgia, and based in Los Angeles. He was the first artist signed to Travis "Taco" Bennett's (of Odd Future) RE7AX Records in association with COR/TAN Records.

Juto plays six instruments, including guitar, bass, keyboards, and trombone, and writes music influenced by the R&B, pop, and gospel music he listened to growing up. He began releasing music on SoundCloud in 2015, and in February 2018 released a 10-minute EP called Text Talk that explored love through the prism of text messaging culture. The EP's four tracks were all named with texting abbreviations, including the single "BTW" which Apple Music featured in its playlist The Plug. In May 2018 he released the single "Summa."

Odd Future member Taco and label executives signed him as the first artist on Taco's new label Re7ax Records.

Juto's major early dates included opening for Daisy and – in his second performance ever – for Lauryn Hill at the Mayan in Los Angeles. On 9 November 2019 he performed at Camp Flog Gnaw Carnival at Dodger Stadium.

In March 2019 he was featured on "Can I Kick It" off Logic's Supermarket album. That same month, Juto released his first EP on Taco's Re7ax label, Velvet, distributed by AWAL, and the single "Homebody/Options" featuring Taco.

He followed it up with the seven-track EP Wool on 1 November, also distributed by AWAL. Singles from that EP included 'FAF' and 'Night Text.'

His concert bookings include headlining the Moroccan Lounge in Los Angeles in January 2020.

== Discography ==
EPs

- Text Talk (February 2018)
- Velvet (21 March 2019)
- Wool (1 November 2019)
- Fleece (December 2021)

Singles

- "Apple" (June 2017)
- "BTW" (February 2018)
- "Summa" (May 2018)
- "Homebody/Options" (March 2019)
- "FAF" (2020)
- "Night Text" (2020)
