= Scorey =

American rapper

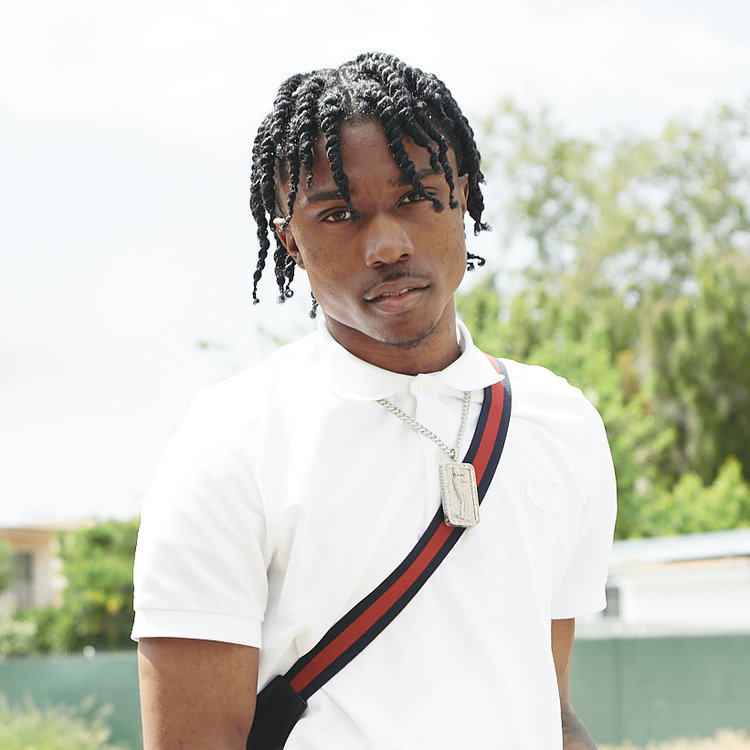
- Scorey in June 2021

Background information
- Also known as: Scorey AKA Scorey Ayee
- Born: Bakari Ward; November 26, 1998 (age 27); Syracuse, New York, U.S.
- Genres: Hip hop; trap
- Occupations: Rapper; singer; songwriter
- Years active: 2018–present
- Labels: Columbia; ODA

Bakari Ward (born November 26, 1998), known professionally as Scorey or Scorey Ayee, is an American rapper and singer from Syracuse, New York. He was the first artist signed to Only Dreamers Achieve Records in 2020, a record label created by Chicago rapper Polo G. Scorey describes Polo G as a mentor to him and he has been described as a protégé of Polo G. His second studio album "If You Feel Lost" released on March 21st 2025.

== Early life ==
Ward grew up listening to rappers such as Lil Wayne, G Herbo and 50 Cent. He mimicked their style and freestyled with his friends. He began recording music in 2018 and taking it seriously in 2019.

During his childhood he enjoyed playing basketball and played on a basketball team either from a club or school.

Ward's music is often influenced by his deceased friends. This includes a friend named Leah, who is referenced multiple times in his songs. In addition, he references Zachary "Zuly" Holloway, who is featured in many of his early music videos. Ward's song "Victim" is filmed at a gathering for Holloway's passing.

When Ward was 21, he nearly died after taking fake Percocet pills that contained fentanyl. He was rushed to the hospital after he blacked out, and has since quit taking Percocet.

== Career ==
Scorey's debut single "Freddy Krueger", released on September 1, 2019, caught the attention of rapper Polo G who saw it posted on a friends Instagram story who was signed to the same label as Scorey. From there Polo G contacted him on Instagram. Days later, Polo G invited him to perform with him at Webster Hall in New York City, as part of his Die a Legend tour, along with rappers such as Yungeen Ace, Luh Kel, and Toosii. It was at this point that he also quit his summer job at Green Lakes State Park as a janitor, which helped pay for his studio sessions and videomaking.

During the recording session for Scorey's single "Moods", Polo G asked him to join his startup record label Only Dreamers Achieve, a partnership with Columbia Records. He accepted and became the first artist signed to the label. His single "Dior You" was the first release under the record label, released on March 12, 2021. He later featured in Polo G's third studio album Hall of Fame released in June 2021.

== Discography ==
=== Studio albums ===
List of albums, with selected details
Title	Album details
Help Is On The Way	Released: December 9, 2022; Label: Columbia, ODA; Format: Digital Download, Streaming
If You Feel Lost	Released: March 21, 2025; Label: Columbia, ODA; Format: Digital Download, Streaming

=== Extended Plays ===
List of EPs, with selected details
Title	EP details
Catch Me If You Can	Released: October 29, 2021; Label: Columbia, ODA; Format: Digital Download, Streaming

=== As lead artist ===
List of singles as lead artist
Title	Year	Peak chart positions		Certifications	Album(s)
Title	Year	US	US R&B /HH	Certifications	Album(s)
"Letter to Mom"	2019	—	—		Non-album singles
"No Way Out"	2019	—	—		Non-album singles
"Freddy Krueger"	2019	—	—		Non-album singles
"Traffic"	2020	—	—		Non-album singles
"Pain Sicken"	2020	—	—		Non-album singles
"Talk To Me"	2020	—	—		Non-album singles
"Storm"	2020	—	—		Non-album singles
"Victim"	2020	—	—		Non-album singles
"Moods"	2020	—	—		Non-album singles
"Die Young"	2021	—	—		Non-album singles
"Cappers" (featuring Lil Roc4TS)	2022	—	—		Non-album singles
"Wicked Romance"	2023	—	—		If You Feel Lost
"Feeling Fine"	2024	—	—		If You Feel Lost
"Wildlife" (featuring Sleepy Hallow)	2024	—	—		If You Feel Lost
"That's Hurt"	2024	—	—		If You Feel Lost
"Dead Roses"	2025	—	—		If You Feel Lost

=== As featured artist ===
Title	Year	Album
"FINDERS KEEPERS" (Dro Kenji featuring Scorey and Internet Money)	2021	WITH OR WITHOUT YOU
"Two Face" (CHIBI LOL featuring Scorey)	2022	IF I STILL HAD A HEART
"Legend" (Lil Spooki featuring Scorey and Stunna Gambino)	2022	Non-album single
"Grave Digger" (Shoebox Baby featuring Scorey)	2022	The Kid That Came Outta Nowhere
"Al Capone" (Segzo featuring Scorey)	2023	Non-album single
"ROCK N ROLL" (AJ Curtis featuring Scorey)	2024	Non-album single
"Bankroll" (CALOUR featuring Scorey)	2024	Non-album single
"Always" (KAGE featuring Scorey)	2024	Non-album single
"Stayed For" (CALOUR featuring Scorey)	2025	Non-album single
"My Time" (Segzo featuring Scorey)	2025	Non-album single
"NIGHTS LIKE THIS" (FLYKICKS featuring Scorey)	2025	Non-album single

=== Guest Appreances ===
List of non-single guest appearances, with other performing artists
Title	Year	Other artist(s)	Album
"Heartfelt"	2021	TOB Duke	Skye
"Shoulders"	2021	Lil Romo	So many losses
"Broken Guitars"	2021	Polo G	Hall Of Fame
"Fell in Love"	2021	SKG Tunez	Mr. Rixh@22
"Chanel Bag (Remix)"	2021	KillBunk	PILOT
"Fast Life"	2022	G Fredo	34 Baby
"Faceshot"	2022	YungLiv	Before The Fame
