= My All (Polo G song) =

2022 single by Polo G

Single by Polo G
- Released: December 9, 2022
- Length: 3:17
- Label: Columbia
- Songwriters: Taurus Bartlett; Joshua Luellen; Lesidney Ragland; Gara; Philipp Riebenstahl; Kevin Gomringer; Tim Gomringer
- Producers: Southside; TooDope; Gara; Yung Swisher; CuBeatz

Polo G singles chronology
"Red Dead" (2022)	"My All" (2022)	"No Time Wasted" (2023)

Music video
- "My All" on YouTube

"My All" is a song by American rapper Polo G, released on December 9, 2022, alongside a music video. It was produced by Southside, TooDope, Gara, Yung Swisher and CuBeatz.

== Background ==
In January 2022, Polo G shared a snippet of the song on Instagram.

== Composition ==
The song uses a "glossy" beat consisting of acoustic guitar. Lyrically, Polo G mourns about breaking up with a lover and discusses how it has changed his views on relationships, while also talking about having sex for enjoyment, spending money on jewelry, and losing friends to neighborhood violence.

== Music video ==
The music video was directed by Cole Bennett. It sees Polo G sitting down and telling his story as re-enactments of his life, such as fighting with his girlfriend and attending a funeral of a friend, happen in the background.

== Charts ==
Chart performance for "My All"
Chart (2022)	Peak position
New Zealand Hot Singles (RMNZ)	11
US Bubbling Under Hot 100 (Billboard)	2
US Hot R&B/Hip-Hop Songs (Billboard)	50
