= No Time Wasted =

2023 single by Polo G featuring Future

Single by Polo G featuring Future
- Released: February 17, 2023
- Length: 2:59
- Label: Columbia
- Songwriters: Taurus Bartlett; Nayvadius Wilburn; Joshua Luellen; Matthew-Kyle Brown; Lukiepmo
- Producers: Southside; Smatt Sertified; Lukiepmo

Polo G singles chronology
"My All" (2022)	"No Time Wasted" (2023)

Future singles chronology
"Martin's Sofa" (2023)	"No Time Wasted" (2023)	"Iris Green" (2023)

Music video
- "No Time Wasted" on YouTube

"No Time Wasted" is a song by American rapper Polo G, released on February 17, 2023 as the fourth single from his upcoming LP with American producer Southside. It features American rapper Future and was produced by Southside, Smatt Sertified and Lukiepmo.

== Composition and lyrics ==
Polo G performs the chorus, singing: "Uh, I know you waitin' / Gettin' fed up, you runnin' out of patience / Just keep your head up, I told you we would make it / Can't give my meds up, I see too many faces". In his verse, he reflects on life in the streets, and touches on his success. In the second verse, Future focuses on the extent of his success and wealth throughout his musical career, the women around him, and the luxuries he can afford for his loved ones.

== Critical reception ==
Hayley Hynes of HotNewHipHop gave the song a "Very Hottttt" rating.

Armon Sadler of Vibe wrote a mixed review of the song, commenting "Though the message is salient conceptually, there is a lack of conviction in the Chicago rapper's voice. Perhaps that is due to the fact he has 'made it' but lines like 'Ayy, look, I do this sh*t for all my guys that got put under' would hit harder if it sounded like he meant it and kept to the theme throughout his verse. Still, the chorus is very relatable". He added, "All in all, there is a powerful message in 'No Time Wasted' that misses the mark due to its delivery."

== Music video ==
The official music video was released alongside the single. Directed by Sam Lecca, it sees the artists on the football field.

== Charts ==
Chart performance for "No Time Wasted"
Chart (2023)	Peak position
Canada Hot 100 (Billboard)	73
New Zealand Hot Singles (RMNZ)	17
US Billboard Hot 100	69
US Hot R&B/Hip-Hop Songs (Billboard)	27
