= Hall of Fame (Polo G album) =

Studio album by Polo G
- Released: June 11, 2021
- Recorded: 2020 – May 2021
- Genres: Trap; drill
- Length: 54:04
- Labels: Columbia; ODA
- Producers: 1040; 12Hunna; 254Bodi; Aidan Hand; Angelo Ferraro; Ben Billions; BJ Beatz; Bobby Raps; Byrd; CashMoneyAP; Daniel Magnusson; David “Messy” Mescon; DMacTooBangin; Einer Bankz; FinesseGTB; FrancisGotHeat; Jenius Level; Jkei; Karltin Bankz; Kid Culture; LenoxBeatmaker; Lil Mosey; LondnBlue; Mason Wu; Mikey Beats; Nato Kitch; Nick Mira; NicoNiceWitIt; Ryder Johnson; SAFE; S.Dot; SephGotTheWaves; Spaceman; Synco; Tahj Money; Taz Taylor; Terrence Rolle; Thank You Fizzle; Varohl; Wheezy; WizardMCE

Polo G chronology
The Goat (2020)	Hall of Fame (2021)	Hall of Fame 2.0 (2021)

Singles from Hall of Fame
- 1. "Epidemic" Released: September 25, 2020; 2. "GNF (OKOKOK)" Released: February 5, 2021; 3. "Rapstar" Released: April 9, 2021; 4. "Gang Gang" Released: May 21, 2021

Hall of Fame is the third studio album by American rapper Polo G. It was released on June 11, 2021. The album features guest appearances from the Kid Laroi, Lil Durk, Lil Wayne, Scorey, G Herbo, Rod Wave, DaBaby, Young Thug, Roddy Ricch, Nicki Minaj, the late Pop Smoke, and Fivio Foreign. Production was handled by Einer Bankz, Angelo Ferraro, D Mac, Karltin Bankz, Londn Blue, BKH, Synco, Tahj Money, Varohl, & WizardMCE, among others. The deluxe edition, Hall of Fame 2.0, was released on December 3, 2021, with fourteen bonus tracks. It features additional guest appearances from Lil Baby, Moneybagg Yo, Yungliv, NLE Choppa, and Lil Tjay.

Hall of Fame debuted atop the Billboard 200, earning 143,000 album-equivalent units in its first week, becoming Polo G's first and only number-one album of his career. The album was supported by four singles, including his first number-one hit on the Hot 100, "Rapstar".

== Background and recording ==
In April 2021, Bartlett hinted at a song with fellow Chicago rapper Lil Durk and Australian rapper the Kid Laroi with a recorded music video. In May, he confirmed fellow Chicago rapper G Herbo would appear on the album, with DJ Scheme previewing a snippet of their song during an Instagram live.

On May 16, 2021, Polo took to Twitter to confirm that he had finished recording the album.

== Artwork ==
The album's artwork was created by art director Zanic, and features Polo G in a suit standing at a lectern with platinum plaques for his prior albums behind him, and a bust of Polo G.

== Release and promotion ==
In September 2020, Polo released the album's lead single "Epidemic". It peaked at number 47 on the US Billboard Hot 100.

On February 5, 2021, he released the album's second single "GNF (OKOKOK)". The song peaked number 55 on the Billboard Hot 100. On April 9, he released the third single "Rapstar". The song peaked number 1 on the Billboard Hot 100, marking the song being his first number-one single in his career. "Rapstar" was previously previewed back in May 2020 in a YouTube video in which Polo and the song's co-producer Einer Bankz performed an acoustic version of the song. The song was then announced two days prior to its release with Polo posting a teaser for the music video. On May 21, "Rapstar" was certified platinum and the same day he released the album's fourth single, "Gang Gang" featuring Lil Wayne. The song peaked number 33 on the Billboard Hot 100. On May 27, Polo released a teaser trailer for the album which also revealed its release date of June 11, 2021, and features a snippet of a new song coined "Lil Wooski" by fans with an option to pre-save the album for all streaming services. On June 2, Polo posted an Instagram video teasing another song from the album with the caption "Toxic", indicating the song's title. On December 3, 2021 Polo released a Deluxe version of the album with 14 additional tracks featured on it.

== Critical reception ==
Professional ratings
Review scores
Source	Rating
AllMusic	3.5/5 stars
HipHopDX	8/10
Pitchfork	7.0/10
Riff Magazine	9/10

Hall of Fame was met with critical acclaim upon release. Pitchfork writer Matthew Ismael Ruiz said in his review of the project: "The Chicago rapper steps further into the mainstream on his third album, an ultimately hopeful exploration of how trauma manifests". Fred Thomas from Allmusic also stated that "Hall of Fame swims even further into the mainstream, offering more of Polo G's catchy if painful reflections over more accessible and pop-minded production. Even still, Some of Hall of Fame's best moments come when Polo G is in his original element, like when he's commiserating with fellow pain rapper Rod Wave on 'Heart of a Giant' or trying on more aggressive approaches on the short but ruthless 'GNF (OKOKOK)'."

== Commercial performance ==
Hall of Fame debuted at number one on the US Billboard 200 chart, earning 143,000 album-equivalent units (including 18,000 copies as traditional album sales) in its first week. The album also accumulated a total of 181.9 million on-demand streams of the album's songs during that week. During the week of September 3, 2021 the album sold 17,100 equivalent units bringing its cumulative total to 514,100.

== Track listing ==
Hall of Fame track listing
No.	Title	Writer(s)	Producer(s)	Length
1.	"Painting Pictures"	Taurus Bartlett	1040; Yung Fuel	2:17
2.	"Rapstar"	Bartlett; Shane Lindstrom; Einer Bankz; Alexander Wu	E. Bankz; Synco	2:46
3.	"No Return" (featuring the Kid Laroi and Lil Durk)	Bartlett; Charlton Howard; Durk Banks	Taz Taylor; Ryder Johnson; Mason Wu	2:48
4.	"Toxic"	Bartlett	Jkei; WizardMCE	2:11
5.	"Epidemic"	Bartlett; Tahj Vaughn; David McDowell; Sterling Reynolds; Lukas Payne	Tahj Money; D Mac; LondnBlue; Karltin Bankz	2:57
6.	"Gang Gang" (with Lil Wayne)	Bartlett; Dwayne Carter, Jr.	Angelo Ferraro	2:59
7.	"Boom"	Bartlett	12Hunna; Spaceman; BJ	2:06
8.	"Black Hearted"	Bartlett	Aidan Han; Damn Mikey	3:10
9.	"Broken Guitars" (featuring Scorey)	Bartlett; Corey Ward	WizardMCE; Daniel Magnusson	2:08
10.	"GNF (OKOKOK)"	Bartlett	Varohl; WizardMCE	1:56
11.	"Go Part 1" (featuring G Herbo)	Bartlett; Herbert Wright III	Kid Culture	2:41
12.	"Heart of a Giant" (featuring Rod Wave)	Bartlett; Rodarius Green	BKH Beats	2:48
13.	"Zooted Freestyle"	Bartlett	Lil Mosey; Nick Mira; NicoNiceWitIt	2:12
14.	"Party Lyfe" (featuring DaBaby)	Bartlett; Jonathan Kirk	Ben Billions; David Mescon; Terrence Rolle	2:51
15.	"Losses" (featuring Young Thug)	Bartlett; Jeffery Williams	Wheezy; Fizzle; Bobby Raps	2:54
16.	"So Real"	Bartlett	SephGotTheWaves	2:44
17.	"Fame & Riches" (featuring Roddy Ricch)	Bartlett; Rodrick Moore, Jr.	WizardMCE	2:31
18.	"For the Love of New York" (with Nicki Minaj)	Bartlett; Onika Maraj	CashMoneyAP; Finesse; Byrd; Menace	2:55
19.	"Clueless" (featuring Pop Smoke and Fivio Foreign)	Bartlett; Bashar Jackson; Maxie Ryles III	Axl Beats	2:45
20.	"Bloody Canvas"	Bartlett	WizardMCE; S.Dot; Safe	4:25
Total length:				54:04

== Charts ==
=== Weekly charts ===
Chart performance for Hall of Fame
Chart (2021–2023)	Peak position
Australian Albums (ARIA)	3
Austrian Albums (Ö3 Austria)	7
Belgian Albums (Ultratop Flanders)	6
Belgian Albums (Ultratop Wallonia)	79
Canadian Albums (Billboard)	2
Danish Albums (Hitlisten)	2
Dutch Albums (Album Top 100)	3
Finnish Albums (Suomen virallinen lista)	10
French Albums (SNEP)	81
German Albums (Offizielle Top 100)	28
Irish Albums (Official Charts)	3
Italian Albums (FIMI)	38
Lithuanian Albums (AGATA)	11
New Zealand Albums (RMNZ)	2
Norwegian Albums (VG-lista)	3
Swedish Albums (Sverigetopplistan)	8
Swiss Albums (Schweizer Hitparade)	5
UK Albums (Official Charts)	3
UK R&B Albums (Official Charts)	38
US Billboard 200	1
US Top R&B/Hip-Hop Albums (Billboard)	1

=== Year-end charts ===
2021 year-end chart performance for Hall of Fame
Chart (2021)	Position
US Billboard 200	58
US Top R&B/Hip-Hop Albums (Billboard)	28

2022 year-end chart performance for Hall of Fame
Chart (2022)	Position
US Billboard 200	27
US Top R&B/Hip-Hop Albums (Billboard)	19

2023 year-end chart performance for Hall of Fame
Chart (2023)	Position
US Billboard 200	190

== Certifications ==
Certifications and sales for Hall of Fame
Region	Certification	Certified units/sales
Canada (Music Canada)	2× Platinum	160,000^{‡}
Denmark (IFPI Danmark)	Gold	10,000^{‡}
United Kingdom (BPI)	Silver	60,000^{‡}
United States (RIAA)	3× Platinum	3,000,000^{‡}
^{‡} Sales+streaming figures based on certification alone.
