= The Goat (album) =

Studio album by Polo G
- Released: May 15, 2020
- Recorded: 2019–2020
- Genres: Hip-hop; trap; conscious hip-hop
- Length: 47:11
- Label: Columbia
- Producers: 1040 Beats; Callari; Charlie Handsome; D Mac; D Major; DJ Ayo; Felipe S.; Hagan; Hit-Boy; Kdubb; Keanu Beats; Khaled Rohaim; Mike WiLL Made-It; MoneyEvery; Murda Beatz; Mustard; Nick Mira; NntySxS; Resource; Sool Got Hits; The Superiors; Tahj Money; Tay Keith; TnTXD; WayneOnABeat

Polo G chronology
Die a Legend (2019)	The Goat (2020)	Hall of Fame (2021)

Singles from The Goat
- 1. "Heartless" Released: September 23, 2019; 2. "Go Stupid" Released: February 14, 2020; 3. "DND" Released: April 10, 2020; 4. "Wishing for a Hero" Released: June 3, 2020; 5. "Martin & Gina" Released: August 13, 2020

The Goat is the second studio album by American rapper Polo G. It was released on May 15, 2020, by Columbia Records. The album features guest appearances from Mustard, Juice Wrld, Stunna 4 Vegas, NLE Choppa, Mike Will Made It, Lil Baby, and BJ the Chicago Kid. It contains the singles "Heartless" (featuring Mustard), "DND", and "Go Stupid" (with Stunna 4 Vegas and NLE Choppa featuring Mike Will Made It). All three singles were released prior to the album.

The album debuted number two on the Billboard 200 chart, with 104,000 album-equivalent units, (of which 14,000 were pure album sales) in its first week. On December 10, 2020, the album was certified Platinum by the Recording Industry Association of America (RIAA) for sales of over 1,000,000 units. It received generally positive reviews from critics.

== Background and promotion ==
The album, along with its cover, was announced on May 5, 2020, through Polo G's Instagram.

=== Singles ===
On September 20, 2019, the album's first single, "Heartless" featuring American record producer Mustard, was released along with its music video.

On February 14, 2020, "Go Stupid" with Stunna 4 Vegas and NLE Choppa, featuring Mike Will Made It, was released as the album's second single.

On April 10, 2020, the third single off the album, "DND", was released.

== Critical reception ==
Professional ratings
Aggregate scores
Source	Rating
Metacritic	83/100
Review scores
Source	Rating
AllMusic	4/5 stars
Consequence of Sound	B+
Earmilk	8/10
HipHopDX	4.1/5
Pitchfork	7.7/10
RapReviews	7.5/10

The Goat was met with widespread critical acclaim upon release. At Metacritic, which assigns a normalized rating out of 100 to reviews from professional publications, the release received an average score of 83, based on five reviews, indicating "universal acclaim".

Paul A. Thompson of Pitchfork stated that "The Chicago rapper's follow-up to his riveting debut LP argues for him as an adaptable and unmissable talent, an unlikely star in a new major-label system".

== Commercial performance ==
The Goat debuted at number two on the US Billboard 200 chart, with 99,000 album-equivalent units, (of which 14,000 were pure album sales) in its first week. It became Polo G's highest-charting album, and his second US top ten debut. The album also accumulated a total of 129.4 million in on-demand streams of the set's songs. In its second week, the album dropped to number five on the chart, earning an additional 52,000 units. In its third week, the album dropped to number seven on the chart, earning 40,000 more units. In its fourth week, the album dropped to number seven on the chart, earning 37,000 units, bringing its four-week total to 228,000 album-equivalent units. On December 2, 2025, the album was certified three-times Platinum by the Recording Industry Association of America (RIAA) for combined sales and album-equivalent units of over 3,000,000 units in the United States.

== Track listing ==
Track listing and credits adapted from Tidal.

No.	Title	Writer(s)	Producer(s)	Length
1.	"Don't Believe the Hype"	Taurus Bartlett; Joseph Steele; Angelo Callari; Darrin Barthellemy	1040 Beats; Callari; D Major	2:54
2.	"Heartless" (featuring Mustard)	Bartlett; Dijon McFarlane; Shah Rukh Zaman Khan	Mustard; GYLTTRYP^{[a]}	3:24
3.	"Martin & Gina"	Bartlett; Hagan Lange; Kyre Trask; Tahj Vaughn	Hagan; Kdubb; Tahj Money	2:12
4.	"Flex" (featuring Juice Wrld)	Bartlett; Jarad Higgins; Chauncey Hollis; Dustin Corbett	Hit-Boy; Corbett^{[a]}	2:43
5.	"Go Stupid" (with Stunna 4 Vegas and NLE Choppa featuring Mike Will Made It)	Bartlett; Khalick Caldwell; Bryson Potts; Michael Williams II; Brytavious Chambers	Mike WiLL Made-It; Tay Keith	2:45
6.	"21"	Bartlett; Keanu Dean Torres; Khaled Rohaim	Keanu Beats; Rohaim	2:43
7.	"33"	Bartlett; Jahmere Tylon	DJ Ayo; Minor2Go^{[c]}	2:50
8.	"I Know"	Bartlett; D Mac; Thomas Horton; Vaughn	D Mac; TnTXD; Tahj Money	2:56
9.	"Beautiful Pain (Losin My Mind)"	Bartlett; Ryan Vojtesak; Shane Lindstrom	Charlie Handsome; Murda Beatz	2:51
10.	"No Matter What"	Bartlett; Nick Mira	Nick Mira	3:19
11.	"Be Something" (featuring Lil Baby)	Bartlett; Dominique Jones; Braylin Bowman	Resource	3:14
12.	"Relentless"	Bartlett; Felipe S.; Rasool Diaz	Felipe S.; Sool Got Hits	3:19
13.	"DND"	Bartlett; Dewayne Kennemer	WayneOnABeat	3:00
14.	"Chinatown"	Bartlett; Tylon; Anthony Catchings-Currie	DJ Ayo; NntySxS	2:52
15.	"Trials & Tribulations"	Bartlett; D Mac; Ryan O'Neil; Vaughn	D Mac; MoneyEvery; Tahj Money	2:56
16.	"Wishing for a Hero" (featuring BJ the Chicago Kid)	Bartlett; Bryan Sledge; Sidney Reynolds; Javon Reynolds; Jeff Gitty; Tupac Shakur; Deon Evans; Bruce Hornsby	The Superiors; Jeff Gitty^{[a]}; Priority Beats^{[b]}	3:04
Total length:				47:11

Notes

- ^{^[a]} signifies a co-producer
- ^{^[b]} signifies an additional producer
- ^{^[c]} signifies an uncredited co-producer

Sample credits

- "Wishing for a Hero" contains samples from "Changes", written by Tupac Shakur, Bruce Hornsby, and Deon Evans, and performed by 2Pac featuring Talent; "Changes" itself contains samples from "The Way It Is", written by Bruce Hornsby.

== Charts ==
=== Weekly charts ===
Chart performance for The Goat
Chart (2020–2024)	Peak position
Australian Albums (ARIA)	10
Austrian Albums (Ö3 Austria)	41
Belgian Albums (Ultratop Flanders)	28
Canadian Albums (Billboard)	2
Danish Albums (Hitlisten)	12
Dutch Albums (Album Top 100)	11
Finnish Albums (Suomen virallinen lista)	38
French Albums (SNEP)	155
German Albums (Offizielle Top 100)	98
Irish Albums (Official Charts)	5
Italian Albums (FIMI)	68
Lithuanian Albums (AGATA)	40
New Zealand Albums (RMNZ)	20
Norwegian Albums (VG-lista)	15
Swedish Albums (Sverigetopplistan)	18
Swiss Albums (Schweizer Hitparade)	40
UK Albums (Official Charts)	6
US Billboard 200	2
US Top R&B/Hip-Hop Albums (Billboard)	2
US Top Rap Albums (Billboard)	2

Chart (2025)	Peak position
Nigerian Albums (TurnTable)	100

=== Year-end charts ===
2020 year-end chart performance for The Goat
Chart (2020)	Position
Australian Albums (ARIA)	99
Belgian Albums (Ultratop Flanders)	127
Danish Albums (Hitlisten)	64
Dutch Albums (Album Top 100)	75
Icelandic Albums (Tónlistinn)	66
US Billboard 200	43
US Top R&B/Hip-Hop Albums (Billboard)	25

2021 year-end chart performance for The Goat
Chart (2021)	Position
Australian Albums (ARIA)	76
Belgian Albums (Ultratop Flanders)	136
Canadian Albums (Billboard)	27
Danish Albums (Hitlisten)	41
Dutch Albums (Album Top 100)	91
Icelandic Albums (Tónlistinn)	47
New Zealand Albums (RMNZ)	46
Swedish Albums (Sverigetopplistan)	65
US Billboard 200	30
US Top R&B/Hip-Hop Albums (Billboard)	15

2022 year-end chart performance for The Goat
Chart (2022)	Position
US Billboard 200	87
US Top R&B/Hip-Hop Albums (Billboard)	62

2023 year-end chart performance for The Goat
Chart (2023)	Position
US Billboard 200	150

== Certifications ==
Certifications for The Goat
Region	Certification	Certified units/sales
Australia (ARIA)	Gold	35,000^{‡}
Canada (Music Canada)	3× Platinum	240,000^{‡}
Denmark (IFPI Danmark)	2× Platinum	40,000^{‡}
New Zealand (RMNZ)	2× Platinum	30,000^{‡}
Sweden (GLF)	Gold	15,000^{‡}
United Kingdom (BPI)	Gold	100,000^{‡}
United States (RIAA)	3× Platinum	3,000,000^{‡}
^{‡} Sales+streaming figures based on certification alone.
