= Gang Gang (Polo G and Lil Wayne song) =

2021 single by Polo G and Lil Wayne

Single by Polo G and Lil Wayne

from the album Hall of Fame
- Released: May 21, 2021
- Recorded: 2021
- Length: 2:58
- Label: Columbia
- Songwriters: Taurus Bartlett; Dwayne Carter Jr.
- Producer: Angelo Ferraro

Polo G singles chronology
"Beat Box 5" / "Wit Dat" (2021)	"Gang Gang" (2021)

Lil Wayne singles chronology
"Gold Fronts" (2021)	"Gang Gang" / "Stunnaman" (2021)

Music video
- "Gang Gang" on YouTube

"Gang Gang" (stylized in all caps) is a song by American rappers Polo G and Lil Wayne. It was released as a single on May 21, 2021, as the fourth single from Polo's third studio album, Hall of Fame. The song was written by the two artists and produced by Angelo Ferraro.

== Charts ==
Chart performance for "Gang Gang"
Chart (2021)	Peak position
Australia (ARIA)	67
Canada Hot 100 (Billboard)	34
Ireland (IRMA)	42
New Zealand Hot Singles (RMNZ)	7
Sweden Heatseeker (Sverigetopplistan)	12
UK Singles (OCC)	56
UK Hip Hop/R&B (OCC)	21
US Billboard Hot 100	33
US Hot R&B/Hip-Hop Songs (Billboard)	13

== Certifications ==
Certifications for "Gang Gang"
Region	Certification	Certified units/sales
Canada (Music Canada)	Platinum	80,000^{‡}
United States (RIAA)	Platinum	1,000,000^{‡}
^{‡} Sales+streaming figures based on certification alone.

== Release history ==
Release dates and formats for "Gang Gang"
Region	Date	Formats	Label	Ref.
Various	May 21, 2021	Digital download, streaming	Columbia	
