= Epidemic (song) =

2020 single by Polo G

Single by Polo G

from the album Hall of Fame
- Released: September 25, 2020
- Length: 2:58
- Label: Columbia
- Songwriter(s): Taurus Bartlett; Tahj Vaughn; David McDowell; Sterling Reynolds; Lukas Payne
- Producer(s): Tahj Money; D Mac; LondnBlue; Karltin Bankz

Polo G singles chronology
"Bookbag 2.0" (2020)	"Epidemic" (2020)	"Bop It" (2020)

Music video
- "Epidemic" on YouTube

"Epidemic" is a song by American rapper Polo G. It was released as the lead single from his third studio album, Hall of Fame (2021), on September 25, 2020. It was produced by Tahj Money, D Mac, LondnBlu and Karltin Bankz.

== Composition and lyrics ==
In the song, Polo G sing-raps about losing people close to him, especially those who died by gun violence, which is described as an "epidemic", stating: "I'm so sick of farewells and RIP's / In the trenches yellin', "Gang gang", mob ties what I bleed / Don't claim to be an opp, 'cause niggas die from that disease / He gon' let that 9 blow with ease". Later, he vows to be careful for the sake of his family ("Promise to my son that the streets won't get no more of me / Remember every line from that obituary poetry"). The song is sung over a piano-based beat.

== Music video ==
The music video was released alongside the single. Directed by Ryan Lynch and shot in Miami, it shows the "lavish lifestyle" of Polo G. The rapper spends time with his friends; he rides in yachts and motorcycles, hanging in the studio and playing basketball.

== Charts ==
Chart (2020)	Peak position
Canada (Canadian Hot 100)	41
Global 200 (Billboard)	56
Ireland (IRMA)	46
New Zealand Hot Singles (RMNZ)	8
Sweden Heatseeker (Sverigetopplistan)	3
UK Singles (OCC)	54
US Billboard Hot 100	47
US Hot R&B/Hip-Hop Songs (Billboard)	17

== Certifications ==
Region	Certification	Certified units/sales
Canada (Music Canada)	Platinum	80,000^{‡}
New Zealand (RMNZ)	Gold	15,000^{‡}
United Kingdom (BPI)	Silver	200,000^{‡}
United States (RIAA)	2× Platinum	2,000,000^{‡}
^{‡} Sales+streaming figures based on certification alone.
