= GNF (OKOKOK) =

2021 single by Polo G

Single by Polo G

from the album Hall of Fame
- Released: February 5, 2021
- Genre: Drill
- Length: 1:56
- Label: Columbia
- Songwriters: Taurus Bartlett; WIZARDMCE; Varohl
- Producers: WIZARDMCE; Varohl

Polo G singles chronology
"Goat Talk 2" (2020)	"GNF (OKOKOK)" (2021)	"Patience" (2021)

Music video
- "GNF (OKOKOK)" on YouTube

"GNF (OKOKOK)" is a song by American rapper Polo G, released on February 5, 2021, after being previewed on February 2. Written alongside Swedish producers WIZARDMCE and Varohl, it was released as the second single from his third album Hall of Fame.

== Composition ==
The song finds Polo G rapping about gang violence on a piano drill beat. He also shouts out to late fellow American rapper and collaborator Pop Smoke, who later appears on the track "Clueless" (also featuring Fivio Foreign) on Hall of Fame.

== Critical reception ==
Wren Graves of Consequence of Sound called the song a "windows-down banger", with its energy derived from Polo G's "call-and-response flow". Tara C. Mahadevan of Complex called the beat of the song "lethal". Wongo Okon of Uproxx wrote that the song is "a strong display of the young rapper's nonchalant spirit as the record is backed by fearless lines like 'If 12 come up, we gon' take 'em on the chase / Just a cold heart and a banger on my waist'."

== Music video ==
A music video was released on February 5, 2021 and was directed by Cole Bennett. The video shows Polo G rapping while surrounded by his crew; he is also seen "on snowy Chicago rooftops and in rainy streets".

== Credits and personnel ==
Credits adapted from Tidal.

- Polo G – vocals,
- WIZARDMCE – production
- Varohl – production
- Dj Nove – recording
- Eric Lagg – mastering
- Joe Grasso – mixing

== Charts ==
Chart performance for "GNF (OKOKOK)"
Chart (2021)	Peak position
Canada Hot 100 (Billboard)	55
Global 200 (Billboard)	109
New Zealand Hot Singles (RMNZ)	8
US Billboard Hot 100	55
US Hot R&B/Hip-Hop Songs (Billboard)	17

== Certifications ==
Certifications for "GNF (OKOKOK)"
Region	Certification	Certified units/sales
Canada (Music Canada)	Gold	40,000^{‡}
United States (RIAA)	Gold	500,000^{‡}
^{‡} Sales+streaming figures based on certification alone.
