= Finer Things (Polo G song) =

Single by Polo G

Single by Polo G

from the album Die a Legend
- Released: November 30, 2018
- Recorded: 2018
- Length: 3:02
- Label: Columbia
- Songwriters: Taurus Bartlett; Jahmere Tylon
- Producer: Ayo

Polo G singles chronology
"Hollywood" (2018)	"Finer Things" (2018)	"Growing Pains" (2018)

Music video
- "Finer Things" on YouTube

"Finer Things" is a song by American rapper Polo G. It was first released in August 2018, before being released through streaming services on November 30, 2018. Upon the song's release, it gained millions of streams and views, helping Polo G rise to fame. The song is also the lead single from his debut studio album Die a Legend (2019).

== Background and composition ==
Polo G wrote the song in the middle of 2018, while he was in jail. The song marks the beginning of his adoption of a melodic approach to rapping, distinct from his drill style. It features piano in the production, over which Polo sings about his pain and trauma from the frequent violence in the streets, as well as departing from his past and starting a new life.

== Music video ==
A music video for the song was released in August 2018. It sees Polo G on the streets with his friends, as well as interspersed clips of him and his family at a beach.

== Certifications ==
Region	Certification	Certified units/sales
Canada (Music Canada)	2× Platinum	160,000^{‡}
United Kingdom (BPI)	Silver	200,000^{‡}
United States (RIAA)	3× Platinum	3,000,000^{‡}
^{‡} Sales+streaming figures based on certification alone.
