= Die a Legend =

Studio album by Polo G
- Released: June 7, 2019
- Recorded: 2018–2019
- Genre: Hip hop; trap
- Length: 41:06
- Label: Columbia
- Producer: 1040 Beats; Ayo; Callari; Detrakz; D Major; Iceberg; JD On Tha Track; Jtk; Priority Beats; Sonic; The Superiors

Polo G chronology
Die a Legend (2019)	The Goat (2020)

Singles from Die a Legend
- 1. "Finer Things" Released: November 30, 2018; 2. "Battle Cry" Released: January 31, 2019; 3. "Pop Out" Released: February 1, 2019; 4. "Deep Wounds" Released: May 17, 2019; 5. "Pop Out Again" Released: June 7, 2019

Die a Legend is the debut studio album by American rapper Polo G. It was released on June 7, 2019, by Columbia Records. It features his US top 20 single "Pop Out" featuring Lil Tjay, as well as the sequel to the track titled "Pop Out Again" featuring Lil Baby and Gunna. The songs "Finer Things", "Battle Cry" and "Deep Wounds" were also released prior to the album. The album received acclaim from music critics.

== Promotion ==
The album was announced May 26, 2019 through his Instagram. The following week, the track listing was revealed.

== Critical reception ==
Professional ratings
Review scores
Source	Rating
AllMusic	4/5 stars
HipHopDX	4/5
Pitchfork	8.3/10

The album received acclaim from critics upon release. Sheldon Pearce of Pitchfork rated the album 8.3 out of 10, and gave it the "Best New Music" award. In his review, he stated that Polo G "blends pop and drill with ease and delivers a standout Chicago street rap debut that is meticulously crafted and honestly told". Riley Wallace of HipHopDX said "There is a beautifully crafted blend of honesty and tragedy within [Die a Legend]". HipHopDX users gave a unanimous review of a perfect 5/5 for the album.

== Commercial performance ==
Die a Legend debuted at number six on the US Billboard 200 chart, with 38,000 album-equivalent units in its first week, becoming Polo G's first top-ten album. In its second week, the album dropped to number seven on the chart, earning 29,000 album-equivalent units. In its third week, the album dropped to number ten on the chart, earning 24,000 album-equivalent units that week. On August 11, 2020, the album was certified Platinum by the Recording Industry Association of America (RIAA) for combined sales and album-equivalent units of over 1,000,000 units in the United States.

== Track listing ==
Credits adapted from Tidal.

No.	Title	Writer(s)	Producer(s)	Length
1.	"Lost Files"	Taurus Bartlett; Sidney Reynolds; Derrico Peck; Detric Jackson	The Superiors; Detrakz^{[a]}; Priority Beats^{[a]}	2:00
2.	"Dyin Breed"	Bartlett; Jahmere Tylon; Jordan Knight	Ayo; Jtk	2:59
3.	"Through da Storm"	Bartlett; Tylon	Ayo	3:15
4.	"Effortless"	Bartlett; Eric Sandoval	Sonic	2:51
5.	"Pop Out" (featuring Lil Tjay)	Bartlett; Tione Merritt; Dylan Berg; João Duarte	Iceberg; JD On Tha Track	2:46
6.	"Battle Cry"	Bartlett; Tylon; Knight	Ayo; Jtk	3:12
7.	"BST"	Bartlett; Tylon; Knight	Ayo; Jtk	3:22
8.	"Finer Things"	Bartlett; Tylon	Ayo	3:02
9.	"Picture This"	Bartlett; Tylon	Ayo	2:45
10.	"Chosen 1"	Bartlett; Knight	Jtk	2:07
11.	"Deep Wounds"	Bartlett; Angelo Callari; Darrin Barthellemy; Joseph Steele	1040 Beats; Callari^{[a]}; Major D^{[a]}	3:00
12.	"Last Strike"	Bartlett; Tylon	Ayo	3:17
13.	"A King's Nightmare"	Bartlett; Tylon	Ayo	2:47
14.	"Pop Out Again" (featuring Lil Baby and Gunna)	Bartlett; Dominique Jones; Sergio Kitchens; Merritt; Berg; Duarte	Iceberg; JD On Tha Track	3:43
Total length:				41:06

Notes

- ^{^[a]} signifies a co-producer
- "Through da Storm" features vocals by Leia Monroe.

== Personnel ==
Credits adapted from Tidal.

Technical

- Ayo – recording engineer (tracks 1, 2, 3, 7, 8. 12, 13), mixing engineer (track 8), mastering engineer (track 8)
- Todd Hurtt – recording engineer (tracks 3, 9, 10, 11)
- Eric Sandoval – recording engineer (track 4)
- Denly Morisset – recording engineer (tracks 5, 14), mixing engineer (tracks 5, 14)
- Luis Bordeaux – recording engineer (tracks 5, 14)
- Jahmere Taylor – recording engineer (track 6)
- Jordan Knight – recording engineer (track 6)
- Baruch "Mixx" Nembhard – mixing engineer (tracks 1–4, 7, 9–13)
- Eric Lagg – mastering engineer (tracks 1–7, 9–14)

== Charts ==
=== Weekly charts ===
Weekly chart performance for Die a Legend
Chart (2019–2025)	Peak position
Canadian Albums (Billboard)	8
Dutch Albums (Album Top 100)	83
Nigerian Albums (TurnTable)	97
Swedish Albums (Sverigetopplistan)	54
US Billboard 200	6
US Top R&B/Hip-Hop Albums (Billboard)	2

=== Year-end charts ===
Year-end chart performance for Die a Legend
Chart (2019)	Position
US Billboard 200	113
US Top R&B/Hip-Hop Albums (Billboard)	45
Chart (2020)	Position
US Billboard 200	102
US Top R&B/Hip-Hop Albums (Billboard)	88
Chart (2021)	Position
US Billboard 200	116

== Certifications ==
Certifications for Die a Legend
Region	Certification	Certified units/sales
Canada (Music Canada)	2× Platinum	160,000^{‡}
Denmark (IFPI Danmark)	Platinum	20,000^{‡}
Sweden (GLF)	Gold	15,000^{‡}
United Kingdom (BPI)	Gold	100,000^{‡}
United States (RIAA)	2× Platinum	2,000,000^{‡}
^{‡} Sales+streaming figures based on certification alone.
