= Polo G =

American rapper (born 1999)

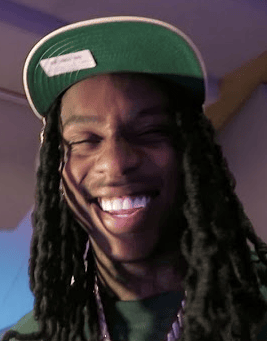
- Polo G in 2022

Background information
- Also known as: Polo Capalot; Lil Capalot; Piano G
- Born: Taurus Tremani Bartlett; January 6, 1999 (age 27); Chicago, Illinois, U.S.
- Genres: Midwestern hip-hop; drill; trap; conscious hip hop
- Occupations: Rapper; singer; songwriter; record executive
- Years active: 2017–present
- Labels: Columbia; ODA
- Children: 1
- Website: polocapalot.com

Taurus Tremani Bartlett (born January 6, 1999), known professionally as Polo G, is an American rapper, singer, and songwriter. He rose to prominence with his singles "Finer Things" and "Pop Out" (featuring Lil Tjay). His debut album Die a Legend (2019) peaked at number six on the US Billboard 200 and was certified double platinum by the RIAA, a feat matched by his two subsequent albums.

Bartlett's second studio album, The Goat (2020), peaked at number two on the Billboard 200 and contained ten songs which charted on the Billboard Hot 100 chart. His third studio album, Hall of Fame (2021), was met with continued success as it became Bartlett's first chart-topping album, also spawning his first number-one single, "Rapstar".

== Early life ==
Taurus Tremani Bartlett was born on January 6, 1999, and raised in the Marshall Field Garden Apartments, located in the Old Town neighborhood on the north side of Chicago, Illinois, to Taurus Bartlett and Stacia Mac. Mac, a former property manager, serves as Bartlett's manager. He is the second of four children, having an older sister, a younger brother, Taurean, who's also a rapper under the stage name Trench Baby, and a younger sister. He attended Wendell Phillips Academy High School, but would later transfer to Innovations High School. After graduating high school, Bartlett was accepted to Lincoln University with a broadcasting major, but decided not to go on his first day, opting to pursue a music career full-time. He is affiliated with the Chicago-based gang Almighty Vice Lord Nation, which is known to feud with gangs like the Gangster Disciples.

== Career ==
=== 2018–2019: Beginnings, record deal, and Die a Legend ===
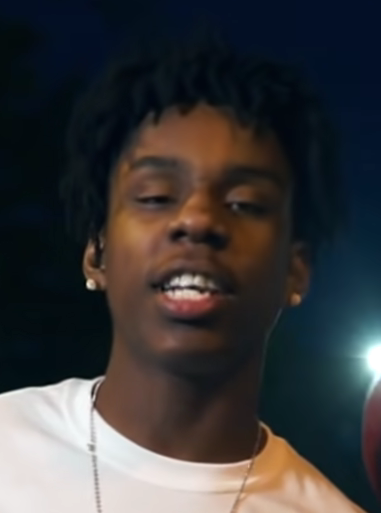
Polo G in 2018

Bartlett's first song ever recorded was titled "ODA", which he released to YouTube. Upon creating a SoundCloud account in 2018, he released the track "Gang with Me", which quickly racked up millions of plays. He continued gaining traction with his songs "Welcome Back" and "Neva Cared". Bartlett went on to release "Finer Things", a song he wrote while incarcerated, in the latter half of 2018 and quickly gained millions of views. In early 2019, Bartlett released "Pop Out" featuring Lil Tjay which peaked at number 11 on the Billboard Hot 100. The song's music video gained over 200 million views on YouTube and led to him signing a record deal with Columbia Records. Bartlett also released videos for his songs "Deep Wounds", "Through da Storm", "Effortless", and "Dyin' Breed" from his debut studio album Die a Legend, which was released on June 7, 2019, and peaked at number 6 on the Billboard 200. "Heartless", a single released later in 2019, featured production from Mustard, and was later featured on his second album.

=== 2020–2021: The Goat, Hall of Fame, and Only Dreamers Achieve Records ===
On February 14, 2020, Bartlett released the track "Go Stupid", with rappers Stunna 4 Vegas and NLE Choppa with featured production from Mike Will Made It and co-production from Tay Keith. "Go Stupid" became his second song on the Hot 100 (after "Pop Out"), peaking at number 60.

Bartlett then released his second studio album, The Goat, on May 15, 2020. The album debuted at number two on the Billboard 200 and ten songs from the album hit the Hot 100, including "Flex" featuring Juice Wrld and "Be Something" featuring Lil Baby, peaking at numbers 30 and 57, respectively. The same month, he was featured alongside Lil Baby on "3 Headed Goat" by Lil Durk which peaked at number 43 on the Billboard Hot 100.

In July, Bartlett was featured on Juice Wrld's posthumous album Legends Never Die on the song "Hate the Other Side". The song peaked at number 10 on the Billboard Hot 100, becoming his first top-ten single. On August 11, 2020, he was included on XXL's 2020 Freshman Class. Later that month, he released the music video for his single "Martin & Gina", which peaked at number 61 on the Billboard Hot 100. In September, he released the single "Epidemic", which peaked at 47 on the Billboard Hot 100. On October 30, 2020, he was featured on "The Code" by King Von off his debut album Welcome to O'Block. The song peaked at number 66 on the Billboard Hot 100 and charted in Canada.

In September, Bartlett announced his own record label, Only Dreamers Achieve (ODA), with Syracuse-based artist Scorey being his first signee.

Bartlett was honored in the 2021 Forbes 30 Under 30 listing, under the music category.

On February 5, 2021, he released the single "GNF (OKOKOK)". On February 12, he was featured on the soundtrack for the film Judas and the Black Messiah, on the song "Last Man Standing". On March 5, Bartlett was also featured on the soundtrack for the 2021 film Boogie on the song "Fashion" by late rapper Pop Smoke. Bartlett collaborated with Lil Tjay and Fivio Foreign on the song "Headshot", released on March 19. His song "Rapstar", released on April 9, 2021, debuted at the number-one spot on the Billboard Hot 100. On May 17, he announced that he finished recording his third studio album Hall of Fame. He released the album's fourth single "Gang Gang" with Lil Wayne on May 21, with the song peaking at 33 on the Hot 100.

On June 11, Bartlett released Hall of Fame, which debuted at number one on the US Billboard 200 and became his first number-one album, selling 143,000 album-equivalent units in its first week. He released Hall of Fame 2.0, a deluxe edition of the album, on December 3, 2021. The album featured fourteen new songs in addition to the previous twenty, and contained guest appearances from Lil Baby, Moneybagg Yo, YungLiV, NLE Choppa, and Lil Tjay.

On July 15, 2021, Bartlett participated at the remix of the song "Lurkin", as a tribute to his friend and late Chicago rapper King Von, to whom the song originally belonged together with Funk Flex.

=== 2022–present: Hiatus and Hood Poet ===
On June 3, 2022, Bartlett released "Distraction", the presumed lead single to his next album. It was accompanied by a music video directed by Christian Breslauer which was released the same day. "Distraction" peaked at number 66 on the Billboard 200 chart.

Bartlett released a variety of singles throughout late 2022 and early 2023, including "Bag Talk", "My All" (including a music video that released on the Lyrical Lemonade YouTube channel), and "No Time Wasted" featuring American Rapper Future.

On March 31, he was featured on the single "Grown Man" by American DJ Marshmello alongside Atlanta-based producer Southside. On April 14, he was featured on NLE Choppa's album Cottonwood 2 on the song "Disability Checks" alongside G Herbo. On May 5, he was featured on SleazyWorld Go's single "Off The Court," where in the accompanying music video he can be seen recreating basketball star Ja Morant's Instagram Live gun-flashing incident in a strip club. On July 14, he was featured on both the posthumous King Von Album Grandson on the song "Phil Jackson," as well as on the song "Beat The Odds Part 2" on Lil Tjay's album 222. On July 21, he was featured on the country song "Heartbroken" by Diplo alongside country singer Jessie Murph, which peaked at 64 on the Billboard Hot 100.

On August 11, Bartlett became the first and only rapper to have all of his albums certified double-platinum.

On August 15, 2023, Bartlett officially announced his next album, Hood Poet (stylized as H.O.O.D P.O.E.T., an acronym for "He Overcame Obstacles During Pain or Emotional Trauma)". He announced a single titled "Barely Holdin' On" for release the following Friday, with the album to release on September 15, 2023. However, the album was delayed after Bartlett and his brother, who raps under the name "Trench Baby," were arrested on kidnapping, armed robbery, and assault charges. Trench Baby was later charged in a separate drive-by murder case. The album was released in August 2024.

On February 16, 2024, Bartlett released the single "Sorrys & Ferraris".

== Artistry ==
Polo G has been associated with the Chicago drill sound, characterized with a melodic style. He often raps over piano-driven beats, which he claims he has perfected the use of. He has been noted for his "vivid and explicit storytelling"; his lyrics often involve tough subjects, including racism and mental health. He has stated that American rappers Lil Wayne and Tupac Shakur are his biggest influences. He also grew up listening to Gucci Mane, as well as Chicago rappers Lil Durk and G Herbo.

== Personal life ==
Bartlett has a son, born on July 6, 2019.

Bartlett was hospitalized on August 12, 2019, due to a near-fatal drug overdose at a party. Due to his aforementioned hospitalization and the death of fellow rapper and friend Juice Wrld, he has since quit Ecstasy and Xanax. His brother Taurean Bartlett uses the stage name Trench Baby; Trench Baby would later be charged with murder in November 2023.

== Legal issues ==
=== Miami arrest ===
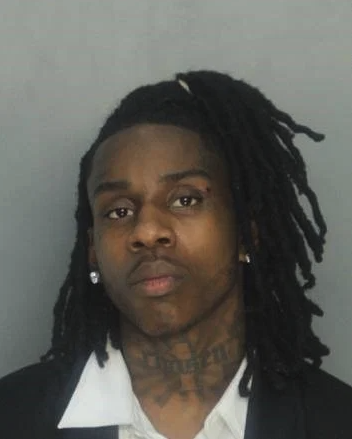
Polo G's 2021 mugshot after his arrest in Miami, Florida

On June 11, 2021, Bartlett and his 16-year-old brother were arrested by officers from the Miami Police Department leaving Bartlett's album release party. Bartlett was charged with two felonies: battery of an officer and threatening a public servant and three misdemeanors: criminal mischief, resisting arrest, and resisting an officer without violence. According to police, the vehicle was stopped due to having "dark tinted windows". Bartlett initially refused to exit the vehicle and called his mother on FaceTime. According to USA Today, in the arrest report, officers stated that they ordered everyone to exit the vehicle to be searched for firearms after a passenger stated that the vehicle was bulletproof. Police stated that Bartlett struggled with the officer attempting to handcuff him, striking him.

In July 2022, TMZ obtained police body cam footage of an irate Bartlett in custody berating the arresting officers. Bartlett is also seen receiving medical treatment and alleges that he passed out after hours in the back of the hot police car in which the police department disputed that it had occurred. Bartlett received criticism in the media for his behavior shown in the video with Bartlett's attorney, Bradford Cohen, stating that the video was "heavily redacted" to make Bartlett look bad.

In a cell phone video that has since been released to the public, upon his mother's arrival, officers refused to give her any information and she stated that she was told that "in Miami, that we would be arrested if I asked what was going on with my minor son or any of my children." She went on to state that she felt "powerless" and later clarify that Bartlett and his brother were passengers in licensed car service driven by hired professional driver and had security personnel with them. Neither Bartlett nor his brother were driving nor owned the vehicle.

On November 15, 2021, police dropped the two felony charges and the misdemeanor charge of criminal mischief citing insufficient evidence. Prosecutors agreed to drop the remaining charges if Bartlett attended an anger management program. It was reported on April 9, 2022, that Bartlett did not plead guilty to any wrongdoing but did complete the program and the remaining charges were dropped.

=== Los Angeles arrests ===
On August 23, 2023, Bartlett and his brother were arrested in connection with a robbery. The two brothers were among four robbery suspects arrested at Bartlett's mansion. The arrests came after police searched Bartlett's mansion and car. An illegal short-barreled rifle would be among the items found during the police search, which led to an additional charge against Bartlett. Following the LAPD robbery and illegal firearm possession-related arrest, the brothers were then arrested again by the Burbank Police Department and booked on kidnapping, robbery, and assault with a deadly weapon charges related to a separate incident which occurred in April 2023. The brothers were released after they each posted $100,000 bail.

On October 19, 2024, Bartlett was arrested in Los Angeles on a gun charge, for which he was not granted bail. On October 21, he would be released one day after posting a $100,000 bond.

=== Manhattan arrest ===
On April 10, 2024, Bartlett was arrested and charged with criminal possession of a weapon and possession of a loaded firearm. He was at his Manhattan Hotel when this occurred. The rapper promptly posted a $25,000 bail.

== Discography ==
Studio albums

- Die a Legend (2019)
- The Goat (2020)
- Hall of Fame (2021)
- Hood Poet (2024)

== Filmography ==
Year	Title	Role	Notes
2021	Juice Wrld: Into the Abyss	Himself	Documentary

== Awards and nominations ==
Award	Year	Nominee	Category	Result	Ref.
Brit Awards	2022	"Rapstar"	International Song of the Year	Nominated	
MTV Video Music Awards	2021	Himself	Best New Artist	Nominated	
MTV Video Music Awards	2021	"Rapstar"	Best Hip-hop	Nominated	
