= Vory discography =

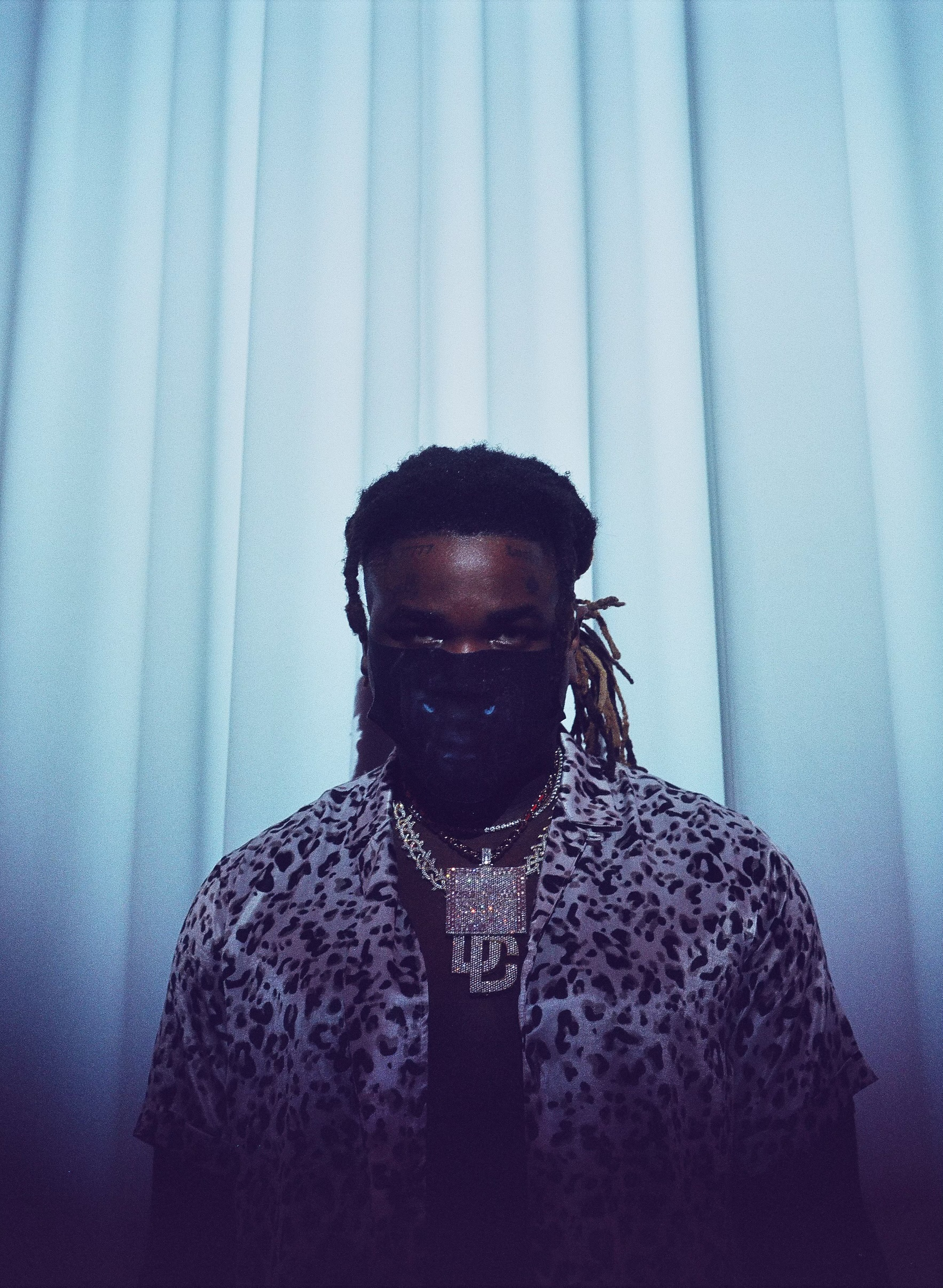
- Hollins in 2021
- Studio albums: 1
- EPs: 1
- Singles: 10
- Mixtapes: 3

The discography of American musician Vory consists of one studio albums, three mixtapes, one extended play, and ten singles (including forty-six as a featured artist).

== Studio albums ==
Studio album with selected details
Title	Details
Lost Souls	Released: June 3, 2022; Label: UMG Recordings, Dream Chasers; Formats: Digital download, streaming

== Mixtapes ==
List of mixtapes with selected details
Title	Details
Overdose	Released: July 1, 2016; Label: FPR Music Group; Formats: Digital download, streaming
Lucky Me	Released: August 17, 2018; Label: Capitol, Electric Feel; Formats: Digital download, streaming
Vory	Released: December 9, 2020; Label: Capitol, Dream Chasers, Electric Feel; Formats: Digital download, streaming

== Extended plays ==
List of Extended plays with selected details
Title	Details
SAY - EP	Released: April 24, 2019; Label: Capitol, Electric Feel; Formats: Digital download, streaming

== Singles ==
List of singles as a lead artist, showing year released and album name
Title	Year	Album
"Overdose"	2016	Overdose
"My Life A Movie" (feat. Blu)	2016	Overdose
"Try"	2017	Lucky Me
"Do That Shit"	2017	Lucky Me
"Hold of Me"	2017	Lucky Me
"You Got It"	2019	TBA
"Bossed Up" (with Zach Salter & Corey Ellis)	2021	TBA
"Do Not Disturb" (feat. Nav and Yung Bleu)	2022	Lost Souls
"Daylight" (feat. Kanye West)	2022	Lost Souls

== Other charted songs ==
List of songs, with selected chart positions, showing year released and album name
Title	Year	Peak chart positions					Album
Title	Year	US	US R&B	US Rap	AUS	CAN	Album
"God Breathed" (Kanye West featuring Vory)	2021	30	—	14	20	33	Donda
"Jonah" (Kanye West featuring Lil Durk and Vory)	2021	27	14	12	19	28	Donda
"No Child Left Behind" (Kanye West featuring Vory and Sunday Service Choir)	2021	53	—	—	31	42	Donda
"Tweaking" (Meek Mill featuring Vory)	2021	— (Note: "Tweaking" did not enter the Billboard Hot 100, but peaked at number 22 on the Bubbling Under Hot 100 chart.)	—	—	—	—	Expensive Pain
"Changed on Me" (Fivio Foreign featuring Vory and Polo G)	2022	— (Note: "Changed on Me" did not enter the Billboard Hot 100, but peaked at number one on the Bubbling Under Hot 100 chart.)	38	—	—	86	B.I.B.L.E.
"—" denotes a recording that did not chart or was not released in that territory.

== Guest appearances ==
List of non-single guest appearances, with other performing artists, showing year released and album name
Title	Year	Other Artists	Album
"Ring Ring"	2019	Rich the Kid	The World Is Yours 2
"Think It's a Game"	2020	Meek Mill	Quarantine Pack
"Somebody"	2020	Beam	Crimson Soundtrack
"God Breathed"	2021	Kanye West	Donda
"Jonah"	2021	Kanye West, Lil Durk	Donda
"No Child Left Behind"	2021	Kanye West, Sunday Service Choir	Donda
"Tweaking"	2021	Meek Mill	Expensive Pain
"The Voice"	2021	NorthSideBenji	The Extravagant Collection
"30mgs"	2022	Beam	Alien
"Thugs Don't Cry"	2022	Duvy	GRASSWAYZ
"Changed on Me"	2022	Fivio Foreign, Polo G	B.I.B.L.E.
"Lord Lift Me Up"	2022	Kanye West	Donda 2
"GRATEFUL"	2022	DJ Khaled	God Did
"Unsettling"	2023	Roy Woods	Mixed Emotions
"Fallback Queen"	2023	Swavy	Different Breed
"40 Days n 40 Nights"	2023	Mariah the Scientist	To Be Eaten Alive
"Never Had This"	2023	Chxrry22	Siren
"Dead Last"	2023	Rick Ross, Meek Mill, Fabolous	Too Good To Be True
"Grandiose"	2023	Rick Ross, Meek Mill	Too Good To Be True
"Godzilla"	2023	Lil Wayne, 2 Chainz	Welcome 2 Collegrove

== Songwriting and guest vocals credits ==
List of songwriting, vocal and feature credits on selected songs
Song	Year	Artist	Album	Role	Notes
"Break Bread"	2015	Bryson Tiller	Trapsoul	Co-writer, vocals	
"Don't"	2015	Bryson Tiller	Trapsoul	Co-writer	US #13
"Friends"	2018	The Carters	Everything Is Love	Co-writer	
"Plans"	2018	88rising	Head in the Clouds (album)	vocals	
"Know Myself"	2018	Justine Skye	Non-album single	Co-writer, vocals, featured	
"Mob Ties"	2018	Drake	Scorpion	Co-writer	US #13
"Ring Ring"	2019	Rich the Kid	The World Is Yours 2	Co-writer, vocals, featured	
"ISSALIE"	2021	Corey Ellis	ISSALIE	Co-writer, vocals, featured	
"God Breathed"	2021	Kanye West	Donda	Vocals	
"Jonah"	2021	Kanye West	Donda	Co-writer, vocals	
"No Child Left Behind"	2021	Kanye West	Donda	Co-writer, vocals	
"Lord Lift Me Up"	2022	Kanye West	Donda 2	Co-writer, vocals	
"Jesse"	2025	Kanye West	Donda 2 (reissue)	Co-writer	
