= The Golden Child (album) =

Studio album by YK Osiris
- Released: October 11, 2019
- Genre: R&B; hip hop
- Length: 42:40
- Label: Def Jam
- Producer: Troy Taylor; Kiwi; KC Supreme; Mgeezy; Musik Major X; Reuel Ethan; Sean Momberger; Taz Taylor; Travis Mills; Alexander Edwards; Arcel Korkutata; Aubrey Robinson; Bedrock; Fresh Ayr; Jsn; Kal V; London on da Track; MyGuyMars; Needlz; RellyMade; Simon Kempner; The Audibles; XL

Singles from The Golden Child
- 1. "Valentine" Released: May 14, 2018; 2. "Worth It" Released: February 8, 2019; 3. "Ride" Released: October 4, 2019

Professional ratings
Review scores
Source	Rating
AllMusic	3/5 stars

The Golden Child is the debut studio album by American singer and rapper YK Osiris. It was released on October 11, 2019. It is Osiris' only album released under Def Jam Recordings; he was released from the label in late 2022. It features guest appearances from Jah Vinci, Kehlani, Russ, Tory Lanez and Ty Dolla $ign.

The album debuted at number 90 on the US Billboard 200 chart. The lead single, Kiwi-produced song "Valentine" was certified Gold by the Recording Industry Association of America on April 25, 2019. The second single, "Worth It", was certified Platinum by the RIAA on October 30, 2019, and became Osiris' first song to hit the Billboard Hot 100 chart.

== Track listing ==
No.	Title	Writer(s)	Producer(s)	Length
1.	"Worth It (Remix)" (featuring Tory Lanez and Ty Dolla $ign)	O. Williams; C. Hedberg; D. Snodgrass, Jr.; K. Candilora, Jr.; M. Goggins, Jr.; O. Woods, Jr.; S. Momberger; T. Mills; D. Peterson; T. Griffin, Jr.	KC Supreme; Kiwi; Mgeezy; Sean Momberger; Taz Taylor; Travis Mills	3:47
2.	"Shakira"	O. Williams; D. Jordan; J. Prince; J. Giannos; S. Tolson	The Audibles	3:08
3.	"Fake No Mo"	O. Williams; J. Holt-May; K. Cain; M. Rashad	Needlz	2:37
4.	"Sexual"	O. Williams; D. Breland; T. Taylor	Troy Taylor	3:17
5.	"Ride" (featuring Kehlani)	O. Williams; A. Boggs; D. Flores; J. Vaughn; J. Muhammad; K. Parrish; Q. Cook; R. Walker	Jsn; Musik MajorX; Reuel Ethan	3:26
6.	"Mind Games" (featuring Russ)	O. Williams; A. Edwards; J. Holt-May; J. Epperson; L. Edwards; R. Vitale	Alexander Edwards; Bedrock; MyGuyMars	3:21
7.	"Change"	O. Williams; G. Harvey	RellyMade	2:36
8.	"Make Lovelude"	O. Williams; D. Breland; T. Taylor	Troy Taylor	0:28
9.	"Make Love"	O. Williams; D. Breland; T. Taylor; K. Austin	Kal V; Troy Taylor	3:12
10.	"Exotic"	O. Williams; Q. Cook; R. Walker; T. Campbell	Musik MajorX; Reuel Ethan; XL	3:35
11.	"Closer" (featuring Jah Vinci)	O. Williams; A. Rhoden; D. Breland; S. Kempner; T. Taylor	Simon Kempner; Troy Taylor	2:48
12.	"Ballin"	O. Williams; A. Korkutata; A. Robinson; L. Holmes	Arcel Korkutata; Aubrey Robinson; London on da Track	2:27
13.	"Everything You Do"	O. Williams; D. Breland; Jeffery Robinson; T. Taylor	Fresh Ayr; Troy Taylor	1:21
14.	"Valentine"	O. Williams; A. Salgado; C. Hedberg	KC Supreme; Kiwi	3:27
15.	"Worth It"	O. Williams; C. Hedberg; D. Snodgrass, Jr.; K. Candilora, Jr.; M. Goggins, Jr.; O. Woods, Jr.; S. Momberger; T. Mills	KC Supreme; Kiwi; Mgeezy; Sean Momberger; Taz Taylor; Travis Mills	3:09
Total length:				42:40

== Charts ==
Chart (2019)	Peak position
US Billboard 200	90
US Top R&B/Hip-Hop Albums (Billboard)	45

== Certifications ==
Region	Certification	Certified units/sales
United States (RIAA)	Gold	500,000^{‡}
^{‡} Sales+streaming figures based on certification alone.

== See also ==
- 2019 in hip hop music
