= Dreamchasers 3 =

Mixtape by Meek Mill
- Released: September 29, 2013
- Genre: Hip-hop
- Labels: Dream Chasers; MMG
- Producers: Boi-1da; Black Metaphor; Cardo; Key Wane; Tak Bar; The Mekanics; R!O; Scott Storch; Jay Cornell; Super CED; Southside; TM88; J. Oliver; Lee Major; Kamo

Meek Mill chronology
Dreams and Nightmares (2012)	Dreamchasers 3 (2013)	Dreams Worth More Than Money (2015)

Dreamchasers 3 is the tenth mixtape by American rapper Meek Mill. It was released on September 29, 2013, by Maybach Music Group and Dream Chasers Records. It was also released for free download on mixtape hosting websites. The mixtape features guest appearances from Travis Scott, Diddy, Nicki Minaj, Rick Ross, Mase, French Montana, Future, Yo Gotti, Fabolous, and Jadakiss, along with his Dream Chasers Records artists Lil Snupe, Omelly, Louie V Gutta, and Guordan Banks, among others.

== Background ==
In November 2012, in an interview with Cosmic Kev producer, Jahlil Beats stated that he would be producing on Dreamchasers 3. On January 5, 2013, Meek Mill revealed a tentative track listing on his Instagram. On March 8, Meek Mill announced that the mixtape would be released on May 6. On August 26, he announced that the mixtape would be released on September 20. On September 3, 2013, the mixtape was pushed back until September 29. The following day, the first song from the mixtape that was released was a track, called "I B On That" featuring Nicki Minaj, French Montana, and Fabolous. On September 11, 2013, he released the final cover artwork for his mixtape. On September 25, in an interview with Rolling Stone, he spoke about a song he was going to make the intro of the mixtape, saying: "Kendrick's verse. Kendrick's verse, man. [Laughs] I don't know if I'ma keep it, though. Some of the guys I'm throwing shots at, I'm actually cool with these guys and I don't really be throwing shots at guys I'm cool with ... that really was influenced by the Kendrick shit, so we'll determine by tonight if I'ma finish that or not. My focus is on the intro, on making another fire-ass intro that I can go crazy to in the club."

== Promotion ==
On October 1, 2013, the music video was released for "I B On That" featuring Nicki Minaj, French Montana, and Fabolous. On December 11, the music video was released for "I'm Leanin" featuring Travis Scott. On January 31, 2014, the music video was released for "Heaven or Hell" featuring Jadakiss and Guordan Banks.

== Critical response ==
Professional ratings
Review scores
Source	Rating
BET	4/5 stars
HipHopDX	(positive)
Stereogum	(positive)
XXL	(L)
Wellington Daily News	(positive)

Dreamchasers 3 was met with generally positive reviews from music critics. Jake Rohn of BET gave the mixtape four out of five stars, saying "Dreamchasers 3, like most mixtapes, does have some filler like "My Life" and the monotonous "We Ain't the Same" (which ironically bares too much similarity to what every other rapper is saying on records these days). It's not perfect, but it's pretty close.With Meek's current momentum, a slew of fellow dreamchasers in his corner and one of the strongest teams in the game behind him, he is establishing himself again as a true star on this tape and a deadly opponent on the mic." Bruce Smith of HipHopDX gave the album a positive review, saying "Fans of Meek Mill’s Dreamchasers or Dreamchasers 2, are bound to find much to like about Dreamchasers 3. However, when Meek’s competition is talking about raising the bar lyrically, and he continues to rap about repo-ing women, and comparing diamond flooded watches to the disaster that was Hurricane Katrina, it won’t be surprising if his overall standing within the game takes another hit. This edition of "Dreamchasers" is closed out with what sounds to be an intro to Meek’s next effort, and hopefully that project shows the growth many think Meek Mill is capable of." Emmanuel C.M. of XXL gave the mixtape an L, saying "Even though the tape isn’t game changing, it does show that Meek is very capable of making propulsive rap music that can also serve as hits. No longer is he only capable of making street anthems; he can actually churn out a vast array of records that will actually get spins. The growth is there. He’s using his strength, raw emotion and skill as a storyteller, and mastering his craft as an artist. However, this is far from the main course, just a table of different selections to temper the appetite."

On December 24, 2013, XXL ranked it at number 20 of their list of best mixtapes of the year.

== Track listing ==
No.	Title	Producer(s)	Length
1.	"I'm Leanin (Intro)" (featuring Travis Scott, Birdman, and Diddy)	Cardo	3:44
2.	"Make Me"	Super CED	4:45
3.	"Dope Dealer" (featuring Rick Ross and Nicki Minaj)	Key Wane	4:48
4.	"Lil Snupe (Skit)" (performed by Lil Snupe)		3:34
5.	"Lil Nigga Snupe"	Boi-1da	3:27
6.	"Ain't Me" (featuring Yo Gotti and Omelly)	J. Oliver	4:35
7.	"I B On Dat" (featuring Nicki Minaj, French Montana, and Fabolous)	Southside; TM88	4:05
8.	"Hip Hop"	Tone Beats	3:02
9.	"Money Ain't No Issue" (featuring Future and Fabolous)	Cardo	4:11
10.	"We Ain't The Same" (performed by Omelly featuring Louie V Gutta)	Jay Cornell	3:30
11.	"Heaven or Hell" (featuring Guordan Banks and Jadakiss)	The Beat Bully	5:12
12.	"Fuckin' Wit Me" (featuring Tory Lanez)	The Mekanics; Scott Storch	3:51
13.	"My Life" (featuring French Montana)	Lee Major	2:52
14.	"Rich Porter (Skit)"		0:54
15.	"Rich Porter" (featuring Rick Ross)	R!O	3:14
16.	"Right Now" (featuring French Montana, Mase, and Cory Gunz)	R!O; Kamo	3:44
17.	"The End (Outro)"	Black Metaphor	3:10
