= WTF (YoungBoy Never Broke Again and Nicki Minaj song) =

2023 song by YoungBoy Never Broke Again

Single by YoungBoy Never Broke Again and Nicki Minaj

from the album Don't Try This at Home
- Released: April 7, 2023
- Genre: Hip hop
- Length: 2:41
- Label: Never Broke Again; Motown
- Songwriters: Kentrell Gaulden; Onika Maraj; Adam Smith; Daniel Lebrun; Maurice Jordan; Aaron Ho; Aiden Yetman; Benjamin Ibrahimovic
- Producers: Dom Wise; D-Roc; Kenoe; Wayv; Yetty; Yo Benji

YoungBoy Never Broke Again singles chronology
"Next" (2023)	"WTF" (2023)	"Rear View" (2023)

Nicki Minaj singles chronology
"Red Ruby Da Sleeze" (2022)	"WTF" (2023)	"Princess Diana" (2023)

Music video
- "WTF" on YouTube

"WTF" is a song by American rappers YoungBoy Never Broke Again and Nicki Minaj, released on April 7, 2023, as the first single from YoungBoy's sixth studio album Don't Try This at Home. It was produced by Dom Wise, D-Roc, Kenoe, Wayv, Yetty, and Yo Benji. The song debuted at number 99 on the US Billboard Hot 100 marking YoungBoy's 99th entry on the chart alongside Nicki's 127th.

== Release and promotion ==
The song was first announced on March 28, 2023, through the Never Broke Again Instagram page in a post in which a placeholder cover art was displayed to build up hype and anticipation for the duo's third collaboration. The majority of the song's promotion was garnered by both artist's fanbase through Twitter just two days prior to the release of the song as "NBA X NICKI" had begun to start trending on the night of its release. As planned, the track was released on April 7, 2023, alongside its music video.

== Composition ==
"WTF" sees a mellow use of 808s and a mild use of the piano while the producers also add claps and bangs to add a psychedelic feel to the track. The song also features several background vocals which give the track a warm gospel-like feel. Trent Fitzgerald for XXL noted that the song is "soulful" and sees YoungBoy and Nicki "deliver cautionary verses to anyone wants to stop them from shining."

== Critical reception ==
Writing for Billboard, Carl Lamarre notes that "YoungBoy and Nicki trade punchy verses alongside ballet dancers" while Nicki simultaneously "torches her feature with a plethora of punchlines." Forbes' Chris Malone Méndez compares Nicki's rhyme scheme and pattern to hers of "Red Ruby da Sleeze" as he writes: "Minaj doesn’t hold back in her rhyming on "WTF," taking aim at anyone who dares to challenge either her or YB." It's also noted that in the track, Nicki "lets the world know that she got Louisiana’s legend back on all matters."

== Music video ==
The Isaac Garcia-directed music video which was released alongside the song is seen to be inspired by the 2010 horror, Black Swan as Nicki "takes on the role of [a] ballerina, donning a tutu and showing students how to plié." The theme of the ballerinas play into YoungBoy's lyric: "They weren't with me when I was hangin' out that car, this ain't realest/Ballerina, we spinned the whole car, somethin' get spilled in it". The video also sees YoungBoy and his newly-wedded wife together in their Utah mansion as they dance and spend time together portraying an image of a king and a queen.

== Personnel ==
Credits and personnel adapted from Tidal.

Musicians

- Adam Smith – production, composer, songwriter
- Daniel Lebrun – production, composer, songwriter
- Maurice Jordan – production, composer, songwriter
- Aaron Ho – production, composer, songwriter
- Aiden Yetman – production, composer, songwriter
- Benjamin Ibrahimovic – production, composer, songwriter
- Kentrell DeSean Gaulden – lead artist, songwriter, composer
- Onika Tanya Maraj-Petty – lead artist, songwriter, composer

Technical

- Jason "Cheese" Goldberg – mastering engineer
- Jason "Cheese" Goldberg – mixing engineer
- YoungBoy Never Broke Again – recording engineer

== Charts ==
Chart performance for "WTF"
Chart (2023)	Peak position
US Billboard Hot 100	99
US Hot R&B/Hip-Hop Songs (Billboard)	32
