= Shaq & Kobe =

2023 single by Rick Ross and Meek Mill

Single by Rick Ross and Meek Mill

from the album Too Good to Be True
- Released: September 29, 2023
- Genre: Hip hop
- Length: 3:39
- Label: Maybach
- Songwriters: William Roberts II; Robert Williams
- Producers: Fresh Ayr; D-Mo

Rick Ross singles chronology
"Miami Mount Rushmore" (2023)	"Shaq & Kobe" (2023)	"Lyrical Eazy" (2023)

Meek Mill singles chronology
"Cartier" (2023)	"Shaq & Kobe" (2023)	"Lyrical Eazy" (2023)

Music video
- "Shaq & Kobe" on YouTube

"Shaq & Kobe" is a song by American rappers Rick Ross and Meek Mill, released on September 29, 2023 as the lead single from their collaborative studio album Too Good to Be True (2023). It was produced by Fresh Ayr and D-Mo. The title of the song is a reference to the dominance of NBA players Shaquille O'Neal and Kobe Bryant.

== Background ==
On September 25, 2023, Meek Mill shared the cover art of the single on Instagram and asked fans to comment if they "miss that MMG sound of rap music", promising to leak the track before the scheduled release date of September 29 if the post reached 20,000 comments. That same day, he also teased the song in a Twitter post which he wrote, "Kobe and shaq …. Rip to the goat legend and father! I learned my motivation and ambition from you I ain't have a dad… I was going off yall Thankyou FRIDAY 🔥🔥🔥🔥🔥🔥🔥🔥🔥🔥🔥 MEEK MILL RICK ROSS 🗣️"

On the night of September 27, 2023, Rick Ross and Meek Mill arrived in Harlem to film the song's music video, during which they had the entire neighborhood outside to make cameos. Rapper Jim Jones also participated in the shoot.

== Content ==
The song finds the rappers talking about their success up to the present time as well as their opulent lifestyles. In the first verse, Meek Mill reflects on being placed on Forbes and how some people "never thought I'd go this far just from a pen and pad". The chorus, performed by both artists, focuses on the effects of having "too much money and power" and pays homage to Kobe Bryant. In the second verse, Rick Ross takes aim at people whom he calls "envious devil demons", asserting his wish for them to "die slow", and details his lavish living arrangements with an allusion to an incident in March 2023 involving his buffaloes which caused trouble for his neighbors. Rick Ross takes the role of Shaq, while Meek Mill takes the role of Kobe.

== Critical reception ==
The song was well-received by music critics. Trace William Cowen Complex stated that Rick Ross "dials up the charisma" in his verse and performs "a memorable series of bars". Flisadam Pointer of Uproxx wrote "Neither waste a bar on a warm-up because there's no time. Both jump straight into their performance to display their lyrical dominance." Chris DeVille of Stereogum described the song as a "crisp, expensive-sounding, radio-friendly rap track" and commented it "has me feeling like it's 2011 in the best way", adding that if Too Good To Be True "sounds like this, it will live up to its title." Alexander Cole of HotNewHipHop wrote, "As for the song itself, there is some inspired production here. Meek begins the track with some dope bars, while Rick Ross comes in and delivers his signature commanding presence. These two have always had good chemistry, and that continues in this offering. If you are someone who has always liked these two as a duo, this new song will act as great fan service. Hopefully, we hear more about this new album, very soon."

== Music video ==
The music video was directed by Kid Art and released alongside the single. It shows Rick Ross' Gulfstream G550 in his hangar, where many luxury cars are lined up as well. The rappers are seen flaunting the luxury vehicles and hanging out under a bridge with their entourage. The clip also sees Belaire Rosé being poured out.

== Charts ==
Chart performance for "Shaq & Kobe"
Chart (2023)	Peak position
US Billboard Hot 100	83
US Hot R&B/Hip-Hop Songs (Billboard)	29
