= Konsequence Muzik =

Canadian music production label

Konsequence Muzik is an independent Canadian music production/label operation based in Alberta with Tristmar "TrizO" Peart as its founder/producer.

TrizO was born in Jamaica and later relocated to Calgary, Canada. In 2008 he was a co-founder of Konsequence International Sound System with Oneil "Diddy" Wint. He later took his musical interest to musical production. In 2025 he produced "Touch Me," a collaboration with Canadian artist CEGIE and G-Loc.

Konsequence Muzik began production in 2013 with its first production Kurfew rhythm. Konsequence Muzik scored its first number-one with Jahmiel's "True Colours," which topped the Tempo Cross Caribbean Countdown chart.

In 2015, Konsequence Muzik released Summa Escape Riddim compilation which included artistes such as Beenie Man, Mavado, Konshens, Lady Saw, and I-Octane. Konsequence Muzik released Life To Live Riddim in 2016, which featured artists such as Gyptian, Jahmiel, Jah Vinci, Exco Levi and Khago.

In 2015, Konsequence Muzik was constructing a recording studio that was expected to open that same year.

In 2017, Konsequence Muzik reached more chart success with Empress Divine's "Natty A Grow" which reached No. 1 on the Canadian Reggae Chart. Eyesus's "Never Judge" reached No. 1 on New York's One Love Reggae Top Ten. Both recordings were produced by Konsequence Muzik.

Eyesus's "Neva Judge" was nominated for Reggae Recording of the Year at the 2018 Juno Awards, and the recording was produced by Konsequence Muzik.

In 2022, Konsequence Muzik produced a collaboration "She Got It" with Serani and Gyptian. Both artists linked up at Konsequence Studio where the collaboration began. Tristmar "TrizO" Peart, founder of Konsequence Muzik, was the producer of this collaboration.
