= Too Good to Be True (Rick Ross and Meek Mill album) =

2023 album by Rick Ross and Meek Mill

Studio album by Rick Ross and Meek Mill
- Released: November 10, 2023
- Genre: Hip-hop
- Length: 59:45
- Labels: Maybach; Gamma
- Producers: ATL Jacob; Beat Novakane; Bongo ByTheWay; Cool & Dre; Cubeatz; DJ Khaled; DJ MO; D-Mo Did It; Dnny Phntm; Fresh Ayr; Hitmaka; Mike Hurst; Breyan Isaac; Sean Momberger; French Montana; Murda Beatz; NixonOnTheTrack; SauceBoy; Preme; Sam Sneak; Stoopid OnTheBeat; Southside; Tay Keith; TheBoyKam; TM88; Tropdavinci; We Good

Rick Ross chronology
Richer Than I Ever Been (2021)	Too Good to Be True (2023)	Set in Stone (2026)

Meek Mill chronology
Flamerz 5 (2022)	Too Good to Be True (2023)	Heathenism (2024)

Singles from Too Good to Be True
- 1. "Shaq & Kobe" Released: September 29, 2023; 2. "Lyrical Eazy" Released: October 20, 2023

Too Good to Be True is a collaborative studio album by American rappers Rick Ross and Meek Mill. It was released on November 10, 2023, through Maybach Music Group under exclusive license to Gamma. It features a single collaboration with Cool & Dre, along with guest appearances from Beam, Vory, Fabolous, Teyana Taylor, DJ Khaled, Wale, The-Dream, French Montana, Future, Shaquille O'Neal, and Dame D.O.L.L.A. It is Rick Ross’ thirteenth album and Meek Mill's sixth album.

== Background and promotion ==
In an interview with Rap Life Radio host Ebro Darden, Ross said that the album was done in about six weeks. The release was first led by the single "Shaq & Kobe" on September 29, 2023, which was accompanied by a music video directed by Kid Art and published the same day. It received positive comments from Diddy saying:

That's when I heard you came and played me the joints, and then when I saw the video, I was like, "Yeah, that's what I'm talking about!" Even Meek, I was like, "Yeah, that n-gga's bucket [hat] hittin' just right." I'm like, "This is refreshing." You know what I'm saying?

On October 20, 2023, the pair released "Lyrical Eazy", which samples Jay Z's The Blueprint song "Breathe Easy (Lyrical Exercise)"; it was accompanied by a music video starring the two speeding in sports cars through New York City before flying in a helicopter. On October 26, a remix to "Shaq & Kobe" featuring Dame D.O.L.L.A. and the titular Shaquille O'Neal was released.

On November 6, a promotional sweepstake was announced, in which participants must fill in seven "lucky numbers" before pre-saving the album and filling out an online form, with a total cash prize of $50,000 up for grabs. It is scheduled to run for 10 days, after which a winner will be announced on Instagram. The album's track listing was announced on November 8, 2023.

== Reception ==
Professional ratings
Review scores
Source	Rating
HipHopDX	2.6/5

Too Good to Be True received generally mixed reviews from critics. Wesley McClean rated the album a 2.6/5, saying: "Rick Ross lacks gravitas, feeling checked out throughout most of the tracklist. A rapper known for his impeccable ear for beats and consistent output, he delivers his laziest and most elementary rhymes to date, pairing them with some of the least interesting instrumentals of his career."

== Track listing ==
Too Good to Be True track listing
No.	Title	Writer(s)	Producer(s)	Length
1.	"Shaq & Kobe"	Robert Williams; William Roberts II; David Meloni Jr.; Jeffery Robinson Jr.	D-Mo Did It; Fresh Ayr	3:39
2.	"Star Island"	Williams; Roberts; Jacob Canady	ATL Jacob	2:17
3.	"Go to Hell" (with Cool & Dre featuring Beam)	Williams; Roberts; Andre Lyon; Marcello Valenzano; Charles Brian Spivey; Charles W. Hairston Jr.; Tylor Santerre Gladden	Cool & Dre; The Mercenaries^{[c]}	3:39
4.	"800 Karats"	Williams; Roberts	ATL Jacob	2:04
5.	"Dead Last" (featuring Vory and Fabolous)	Williams; Roberts; Tavoris Hollins Jr.; John David Jackson	TM88; Slo Meezy^{[c]}; Sid^{[c]}; Macnificent^{[c]}; Kid Wonder^{[c]}; B March^{[c]}	4:16
6.	"They Don't Really Love You"	Roberts; Breyan Isaac; Donny Flores	Isaac; We Good	4:38
7.	"Million Dollar Trap"	Williams; Roberts	ATL Jacob	2:23
8.	"Grandiose" (featuring Vory)	Williams; Roberts; Hollins; Shane Lindstrom; Tahj Morgan; Darryl Clemons; Sean Momberger	Murda Beatz; JetsonMade^{[c]}; Pooh Beatz^{[c]}; Momberger^{[c]}	2:54
9.	"Above the Law" (featuring Teyana Taylor and DJ Khaled)	Williams; Roberts; Teyana Taylor; Khaled Khaled	DJ Khaled	3:32
10.	"Fine Lines" (performed by Rick Ross featuring Wale and The-Dream)	Roberts; Olubowale Akintimehin; Terius Gesteelde-Diamant; Devin Perez; David Anthony Bermudez	Tropdavinci; The-Dream^{[c]}; NixonOnTheTrack^{[c]}	4:58
11.	"Gold Medals" (featuring Jeremih)	Williams; Roberts; Jeremih; Uforo Ebong; Christian Ward	Hitmaka; BongoByTheWay	4:32
12.	"Iconic"	Williams; Roberts	Mike Hurst	3:44
13.	"Lyrical Eazy"	Williams; Roberts; Daniel Wagner Cash; Kamyar Karimi; Mohammad Nasrollahnejad; Phillip Michael William Campbell; Raynford Humphrey; Sean Momberger	Momberger; DJ Mo; Sauceboy; Dnny Phntm; TheBoyKam; Preme	1:40
14.	"Pillow Talk"	Williams; Roberts; Tay Keith; Kevin Gomringer; Cubeatz	Keith; Cubeatz	2:42
15.	"Millionaire Row" (performed by Rick Ross featuring French Montana)	Roberts; French Montana; Samuel Saint Jean; Juan Peters	Sam Sneak; Stoopid OnDaBeat; French Montana	2:46
16.	"In Luv with the Money" (performed by Rick Ross featuring Future)	Roberts; Future	Southside	3:09
17.	"Shaq & Kobe" (remix; featuring Shaquille O'Neal and Dame D.O.L.L.A.)	Williams; Roberts; Shaquille O'Neal; Damian Lillard; Meloni; Robinson	D-Mo Did It; Fresh Ayr	6:52
Total length:				59:45

Note

- ^{^[c]} signifies a co-producer

== Personnel ==
- Colin Leonard – mastering
- Eddie Hernández – mixing
- Javier Valverde – Atmos mix engineering
- Amani Hernández – mixing assistance
- David Bermudez – engineering (tracks 1, 2, 4–17)
- Anthony Cruz – engineering (tracks 1, 5, 7)
- Thomas Bennett – engineering (tracks 3, 12)
- Brandon Harding – engineering (track 10)
- Kev Spencer – engineering (track 10)
- Nathan Alford – mixing, engineering (track 17)

== Charts ==
Chart performance for Too Good to Be True
Chart (2023)	Peak position
Canadian Albums (Billboard)	71
UK Album Downloads (Official Charts)	24
UK R&B Albums (Official Charts)	29
US Billboard 200	23
US Independent Albums (Billboard)	3
US Top R&B/Hip-Hop Albums (Billboard)	7
