= Don't Try This at Home (YoungBoy Never Broke Again album) =

Studio album by YoungBoy Never Broke Again
- Released: April 21, 2023
- Genre: Hip-hop
- Length: 85:27
- Label: Never Broke Again; Motown
- Producer: 1MercyBeatz; Al Geno; Aye Peewee; Bans; BboyBeatz; Berge; BJondatrakk; Blom; Brxtn; BWolf201; Callari; Cheese; Craig Shur; Cxshmxde; Dexter Randall; Dmac; Dom Wise; Don; DrellOnTheTrack; Dremusiq; D-Roc; Dubba-AA; Dunk Rock; Euphoric; Figurez Made It; FlexOnDaTrack; Fresh Ayr; G13 Beats; Horridrunitup; India Got Them Beats; Jacobsen; Jay Lv; JB Sauced Up; JTBeatz; JustAcoustic; K10Beatz; K4ProducedIt; Kenoe; Khris James XO; Lastwordbeats; Lemy; Leor Shevah; LondnBlue; Loso; Louie Bandz; Lucent; MalikOTB; MarsGawd; OzzySynthMaster; PonchoMadeThat; Sauceboy; Silkbeats; Simo Fre; Skeeo!; Skolo; Slickk; Smokescreen; Str8cash; Supah Mario; Timmy Da HitMan; Tmu.3x; TnTXD; Uncle Cameron; Wayv; We Love Heavy; Wireshark; Xclusive; Yakree; Yetty; Yo Benji; Znayshi

YoungBoy Never Broke Again chronology
I Rest My Case (2023)	Don't Try This at Home (2023)	Richest Opp (2023)

Singles from Don't Try This at Home
- 1. "WTF" Released: April 7, 2023; 2. "Rear View" Released: April 14, 2023

Don't Try This at Home is the sixth studio album by American rapper YoungBoy Never Broke Again. It was released on April 21, 2023, by Never Broke Again and Motown. The album features guest appearances from Mariah the Scientist, Nicki Minaj, Post Malone, and the Kid Laroi. It includes production from YoungBoy's two in-house engineers, Jason "Cheese" Goldberg and Khris James, alongside Dom Beats, Kenoe, Wayv, Yetty, Fresh Ayr and Yo Benji. The project marks YoungBoy's second with Motown and his second in 2023, following January's I Rest My Case.

== Release and promotion ==
Don't Try This at Home was first teased in late 2022 through YoungBoy's AMP show where he was contemplating the titles of his then fifth studio album, I Rest My Case. Following the release of the album, on February 1, 2023, YoungBoy appeared on the cover of Billboard's Power 100 magazine. YoungBoy's appearance on the cover of the magazine was accompanied by an interview from Billboard, in which it was noted by Meaghan Garvey that the album was on its way: "He's already preparing his next album, which he's calling Don't Try This at Home." Following the interview with Billboard, on February 16, 2023, YoungBoy appeared on Elliott Wilson and Brian "B.Dot" Miller's highly acclaimed hip-hop podcast, Rap Radar in which he noted that he would return to his original self on Don't Try This at Home following the controversial remarks regarding I Rest My Case: "Oh, I'ma talk crazy on there. You know what I'm sayin'? Murder man. But, I'm lettin' you know though, don't try this at home." The existence of the project was officially announced on February 26, 2023, through the Instagram account of the Never Broke Again label. On March 21, 2023, YoungBoy announced the project via his new Twitter in which he posted the cover art, release date, and the number of tracks on the project. However, the album was officially announced on March 22, 2023, by Motown Records through an Instagram post in which they revealed the album's release date while displaying a placeholder cover art.

The song's tracklist was announced several times to release on April 20, 2023, just a day prior to the release of the album, however, due to unforeseen circumstances and several last-minute changes to the album's tracklist, it was released alongside the release of the album itself. However, the tracklist was available early on both Spotify and Amazon Music, increasing the hype behind the project due to the appearances of several snippets such as "Big Truck", "By Myself", "Spin & Ben'n", "War", "Grave Digga", "Off the Lean", and one of YoungBoy's most requested and highly anticipated snippets that his manager Alex Junnier noted "will never drop", the album's twenty-ninth cut, "Cemetery Lifestyle".

=== Singles ===
Prior to the release of the album, YoungBoy released several singles which teased the album in each of their respected music videos as they shared a similarly typed-out theme, writing: "Album: Don't Try This at Home". This was first seen following the release of "Next" on February 27, 2023. Just days later, a similar theme was shown in the music video of "Demon Party" which was released on March 2, 2023.

The album's lead single "WTF" featuring Nicki Minaj was announced weeks prior to its release; it was officially released on April 7, 2023, and was accompanied by its respected music video. The album's second single "Rear View" with Mariah the Scientist was released on April 14, 2023, just a week prior to the release of the album.

=== Album release party ===
On April 11, 2023, it was announced that YoungBoy would hold his first-ever album release party in his career for Don't Try This at Home on April 20, 2023, just a day before the album's official release. The party would be held at Elevate Lounge in Downtown Los Angeles. The event, costing approximately $200,000, was reportedly sponsored by 50 Cent's Branson Cognac, and hosted by DJ Carisma, DJ Vision, and DJ Bad. During the release party, there was to be an option for fans to participate in a raffle in which they would have had a chance to converse with the rapper; the conversations was to take place via a live stream, as YoungBoy was on house arrest at the time.

Expected to video-call in and despite organizing and going through with the party, reports note that YoungBoy was facing technical difficulties, leading to him not attending his own party. However, a source allegedly told TMZ that YoungBoy had fallen asleep, which apparently lead to him missing his own release party.

== Artwork ==
The official artwork for Don't Try This at Home shares a resemblance to the cover art of Toronto rapper Drake's fourth studio album, Views (2016), which places Drake atop the CN Tower in his hometown of Toronto, Ontario. Similarly, YoungBoy is seen at the bottom of a steamboat in front of the Horace Wilkinson Bridge in his birthplace of Baton Rouge, Louisiana. Both covers also share the same conceptual similarity to that of the alternate album artwork of Eminem's Recovery (2010), showing him sitting in a transparent living room in the shape of a rectangular cube, with the Renaissance Center in the background in the rapper's hometown of Detroit, Michigan.

In March 2023, YoungBoy alluded to his return to Baton Rouge after being on house arrest in Salt Lake City, Utah, since 2021. Referring to his return to his hometown, the album's name can be seen as a metaphor to not "try it" and for one to not push their luck with YoungBoy while he is in Baton Rouge due to his power and influence in the gang violence-ridden city where YoungBoy is facing federal firearm charges.

== Critical reception ==
Professional ratings
Review scores
Source	Rating
Clash	5/10

Don't Try This at Home received mixed reviews from music critics. Robin Murray from Clash stated that "nobody, needs to listen to a 33 track album. Not in this era, and not – in truth – in any other era", however, he also stated that the album features his "crisp flow", which he "continually delivers". Concluding his review, Murray noted that Don't Try This at Home is "a scattergun approach that feels unable to reign itself" and that it is "both servant to and a victim of YoungBoy Never Broke Again's largesse".

Prelude Press's Dom Vigil stated that Don't Try This at Home "finds [YoungBoy] firing on all cylinders, masterfully wielding his off-kilter signature flow, dipping in and out of incisive verses and infectious melodies." Writing for Shifter, Kevin Bourne stated that the album can be broken down into "piano bangers, angsty melodic tracks, generic bangers, and laid back songs", while he continued to write that the majority of the album is compiled of "menacing chords". His review concluded as he wrote that, "NBA Youngboy's latest is decent, but creativity, lacks depth and growth."

== Commercial performance ==
Don't Try This at Home debuted at number five on the US Billboard 200 chart, earning 60,000 album-equivalent units in its first week, including 1,000 pure album sales. This became Youngboy's 14th top-ten charting album on the chart. It also debuted at number one on the US Billboard Top R&B/Hip-Hop Albums chart, it is Youngboy's eighth number one album on the chart.

== Track listing ==
Don't Try This at Home track listing
No.	Title	Writer(s)	Producer(s)	Length
1.	"Big Truck"	Kentrell Gaulden; Jason Goldberg; Angelo Callari; Craig Scheuring; Brian Wolf	Cheese; Callari; CraigShur; BWolf	2:44
2.	"Mr Gaulden"	Gaulden; Daniel Lebrun; Aaron Lenny; Brandon Russell; Michael Roberge	Droc; Lenny; BJ; Berge	3:11
3.	"Take Down"	Gaulden; Goldberg; Malik Bynoe-Fisher; Leo Mateus	Cheese; MalikOTB; WassupBans	2:26
4.	"By Myself"	Gaulden; KeiArahn Lewis; Kyler Mathis; Ezekiel Richards	K10 Beatz; Ponco; Silk Beats	3:11
5.	"Out Nothing"	Gaulden; Lebrun; Jeppe Jacobsen; Myeong Geun Song	Droc; Jacobsen; Skolo Beatz	2:28
6.	"Bangin My Line"	Gaulden; Goldberg; Mathis; Seth Love; Nicky Thysavathdy	Cheese; K10 Beatz; Slickk; Skeeo	1:59
7.	"Rear View" (with Mariah the Scientist)	Gaulden; Mariah Buckles; Josh Joseph; Samuel Thanni; Kendrell Mattox	Khris James XO; DrellOnTheTrack	2:30
8.	"Hustle"	Gaulden; Lebrun; Egor Chupin; William Dawodu; Josehph Nguyen	Droc; 1znayshi; Euphoric; Wireshark	2:20
9.	"Morning"	Gaulden; Lebrun; Luis Ortiz; Traevon Walker	Droc; G13; Xclusive	1:59
10.	"Homicide Pt. 2"	Gaulden; Goldberg; Scheuring; Leor Shavah; Matthew McQueen	Cheese; CraigShur; Leor; Smokescreen	1:49
11.	"Cold Killers"	Gaulden; Goldberg; William Ramos; Brian Stewart, Jr.	Cheese; Ayepeewee; Bboybeatz	2:36
12.	"WTF" (with Nicki Minaj)	Gaulden; Onika Maraj-Petty; Adam Smith; Lebrun; Maurice Jordan; Aaron Ho; Aiden Yetman; Benjamin Ibrahimovic	Dom Wise; Droc; Kenoe; Wayv Yetty; Yo Benji	2:40
13.	"Choppa Docter"	Gaulden; Goldberg; Jordan; Jonathan Priester; Shubhjit Balam; Anton Ingvarsson; James Therrien	Cheese; Kenoe; Supah Mario; JTBeatz; We Love Heavy; Horridrunitup	2:46
14.	"Trust Issues"	Gaulden; Jeremy Bradley; Timothy Link	Timmydahitman; Jbsaucedup	2:55
15.	"Run the Hood"	Gaulden; Kayshaun Mclean; Christopher Trejo	K4ProducedIt; Mercy Beatz	2:24
16.	"No Rubber"	Gaulden; Lebrun	Droc; Sauceboy; Skeeo; TMU3x	2:41
17.	"Loaded Now"	Gaulden; Goldberg; Mattox; Trejo	Cheese; DrellOnTheTrack; Mercy Beatz	1:57
18.	"Got One"	Gaulden; Goldberg; Jordan; Love	Cheese; Kenoe; Skeeo	2:37
19.	"Spin&Ben'n"	Gaulden; Lebrun; Thanni; Sterling Reynolds; Will Boyette; Gineau Johan	Droc; Khris James XO; Londnblue; Loso; Lucent; Timmydahitman	2:33
20.	"1.5"	Gaulden; Goldberg; McQueen; Simone Di Franco; Felix Govaerts	Cheese; Smokescreen; FlexOnDaTrack; Simo Fre	2:43
21.	"War"	Gaulden; Jordan; Yetman; Gene Hixon; James Jarvis	Al Geno; James Acoustic; Yetty	2:47
22.	"Grave Digga"	Gaulden; Lebrun; Hill; Roberge	Droc; Lastwordbeats; Berge	2:46
23.	"Off the Lean"	Gaulden	Str8cash; TNTXD; Yakree	3:24
24.	"What You Say" (featuring Post Malone and the Kid Laroi)	Gaulden; Austin Post; Charlton Howard; Jeff Robinson; Goldberg; Simon Walbrook	Fresh Ayr; Cheese; OzzySynthMaster	4:03
25.	"No Lease"	Gaulden	Jay LV; MalikOTB; WassupBans; XO	1:45
26.	"Slimeto"	Gaulden	27 Heavy; Cheese; K10 Beatz; Medusa Beats	2:31
27.	"Another Dead"	Gaulden; Thanni; Jordan; Love	Kenoe; Skeeo; Khris James XO	2:18
28.	"Pistol Totting"	Gaulden; Lebrun; Thanni; Ibrahimovic; David Blom; Jordan Eden	Droc; Khris James XO; Yo Benji; Blom; Tfisdon	2:27
29.	"Cemetery Lifestyle"	Gaulden; Cameron Hubler; Deondre Davis; Aaron Lockhart, Jr.; Dennis Neal; Braxton Troxel	Uncle Cameron; Dre Musiq; Dubba-Aa; Louie Bandz; Braxton	2:14
30.	"Don't Leave"	Gaulden; Goldberg; Reynolds; Thomas Horton; David McDowell	Cheese; Londnblue; TNTXD; Dmac	2:35
31.	"Head Shot"	Gaulden; Goldberg; Jordan; Mclean; India Williams	Cheese; Kenoe; Indiagotthembeatz; K4	2:28
32.	"I Is That"	Gaulden; Bradley; Horton; Josh Joseph	Cheese; TNTXD; Jbsaucedup; MarsGawd	3:12
33.	"Like Madden"	Gaulden; Goldberg; Dexter Randall; Lucas DiFabbio	Cheese; Dex; Dunkrock	2:28
Total length:				85:27

== Personnel ==
Credits and personnel adapted from Tidal.

Musicians

- YoungBoy Never Broke Again – rap vocals
- Mariah the Scientist – vocals (7)
- Nicki Minaj – rap vocals (12)
- Post Malone – rap vocals (24)
- The Kid Laroi – rap vocals (24)

Technical

- YoungBoy Never Broke Again – recording
- Samuel "Khris James XO" Thanni – recording (1, 7, 10, 12, 19, 20, 22, 23, 26)
- Jason "Cheese" Goldberg – mastering, mixing, engineering
- Chris Athens – mastering (12)
- Aubry "Big Juice" Delaine – engineering (12)

== Charts ==
=== Weekly charts ===
Weekly chart performance for Don't Try This at Home
Chart (2023)	Peak position
Canadian Albums (Billboard)	92
US Billboard 200	5
US Top R&B/Hip-Hop Albums (Billboard)	1

=== Year-end charts ===
Year-end chart performance for Don't Try This at Home
Chart (2023)	Position
US Top R&B/Hip-Hop Albums (Billboard)	70
