= Lost Souls (Vory album) =

Studio album by Vory
- Released: June 3, 2022
- Length: 48:48
- Label: Dream Chasers; UMG
- Producer: 88-Keys; Akxen; Amaire Johnson; Bass Charity; BEAM; BLK Beats; Boi-1da; BoogzDaBeast; Chi Chi; Dougie on the Beat; E*vax; Figurez Made It; FnZ; FRAXILLE; JW Lucas; Khristopher Riddick-Tynes; Matthew Burnett; Nathan Butts; Noah Pettigrew; OG Parker; Ojivolta; Omari Johnson; Pooh Beatz; Red On The Beat; Samuel C Harris; Section 8; Smash David; Sonus030; Thomas Crager; TT Audi; Tyree Hawkins; Ye; Young Martey

Vory chronology
Vory (2020)	Lost Souls (2022)

Singles from Lost Souls
- 1. "Do Not Disturb" Released: May 13, 2022; 2. "Daylight" Released: May 31, 2022

Lost Souls is the debut studio album by American rapper and singer Vory. It was released on June 3, 2022, through UMG Recordings and Dream Chasers Records. The album features guest appearances from notable artists such as Kanye West, BLEU, NAV, BEAM, Landstrip Chip, and Fresco Trey. It has two singles: "Do Not Disturb" featuring BLEU and NAV which was released on May 13, 2022, and "Daylight" featuring Kanye West. The album reached number one on the Billboard Heatseekers chart.

== Track listing ==
No.	Title	Writer(s)	Producer(s)	Length
1.	"Lost Souls" (featuring Fresco Trey)	Tavoris Hollins Jr.; Trey Davis; Aramis Gentry; Samuel C Harris	Red on the Beat; Harris; Thomas Crager	3:21
2.	"Daylight" (featuring Kanye West)	Hollins Jr.; Ye; Charles Njapa; Evan Mast; Richard "Popcorn" Wylie; Eddie Holland; Brian Holland; Lamont Dozier; Raul Cubina; Mark Williams	Ye; 88-Keys; E*vax; Ojivolta	3:25
3.	"Lesson Learned"	Hollins Jr.; Tyree Hawkins; Nathan Butts	Hawkins; Butts	3:29
4.	"Do Not Disturb" (featuring BLEU & NAV)	Hollins Jr.; Jeremy Biddle; Navraj Goraya; Patrik Marti; David Rangi Jr.	Young Martey	3:27
5.	"Chanel Fix" (featuring Landstrip Chip)	Hollins Jr.; Jordan Holt-May; Rai'Shaun Williams; Chidi Osondu; Noah Pettigrew	Section 8; Chi Chi; 'noah	2:44
6.	"Happy Birthday 2U"	Hollins Jr.; Hawkins; Butts	Hawkins; Butts	2:19
7.	"CWR Interlude"	Hollins Jr.; Sonu Lal; Athena Poulos; Luzian Tuetsch; Jorge Cardoso Augusto; Harissis Tsakmaklis; Feliciano Ecar	Sonus030; Bass Charity	2:19
8.	"Mind Games"	Hollins Jr.; Samuel Jimenez; Jonas Gumdal; John Lucas	Smash David; FRAXILLE; JW Lucas	3:37
9.	"I.J.S"	Hollins Jr.; Khristopher Riddick-Tynes; Luzian Tuetsch; Blair Ferguson; Augusto; Ecar; Tsakmaklis	The Rascals; Bass Charity; BLK Beats	2:58
10.	"Believe In Me"	Hollins Jr.; Kenneth Gamble; Leon Huff	Smash David; Figurez Made It; Pooh Beatz; BoogzDaBeast; Amaire Johnson	1:38
11.	"Lost Angels"	Hollins Jr.; Brown; Arasb Ghassemi	TT Audi; Akxen	2:24
12.	"Fuck Being Famous" (featuring BEAM)	Hollins Jr.	BEAM; Butts; Hawkins	3:19
13.	"Cindy's Interlude"	Hollins Jr.; Butts; Hawkins	Nathan Butts; Tyree Hawkins	3:06
14.	"Project Baby"	Hollins Jr.; Matthew Samuels; Marti; Brown	Boi-1da; Matthew Burnett; Young Martey	2:28
15.	"Dark Clouds"	Hollins Jr.; Joshua Parker; Jimenez; Michael Mule; Isaac De Boni; Darryl Clemons	OG Parker; Smash David; FnZ; BoogzDaBeast; Pooh Beatz	2:50
16.	"Not My Friends"	Hollins Jr.; Douglas Whitehead	Dougie on the Beat	2:24
17.	"Wallo267 Speaks"	Wallance Peeples	Smash David; Figurez Made It	3:35
Total length:				48:48
