= Rear View (song) =

2023 song by YoungBoy Never Broke Again

Single by YoungBoy Never Broke Again and Mariah the Scientist

from the album Don't Try This at Home
- Released: April 14, 2023
- Length: 2:30
- Label: Never Broke Again; Motown
- Songwriters: Kentrell Gaulden; Mariah Buckles; Josh Joseph; Samuel Thanni; Kendrell Mattox
- Producers: DrellOnTheTrack; MarsGawd; LondnBlue; Khris James

YoungBoy Never Broke Again singles chronology
"WTF" (2023)	"Rear View" (2023)

Mariah the Scientist singles chronology
"Christmas in Toronto" (2023)	"Rear View" (2023)	"IDGAF" (2023)

Music video
- "Rear View" on YouTube

"Rear View" is a song by American rapper YoungBoy Never Broke Again and American singer Mariah the Scientist. It was released on April 14, 2023, as the second single from YoungBoy's sixth studio album Don't Try This at Home. It was produced by DrellOnTheTrack, MarsGawd, LondnBlue and Khris James, one of YoungBoy's in-house engineers. The song was mixed and mastered by Jason "Cheese" Goldberg, another one of YoungBoy's in-house engineers.

== Release and promotion ==
The song was first announced on April 13, 2023, by Mariah through her Twitter. The song's promotional covert art was later posted to the Never Broke Again Instagram, officially announcing the track, hours prior to its release.

== Composition ==
"Rear View" sees a soft and subtle use of the piano while YoungBoy raps about his toxic, failed relationship with his ex-girlfriend. Mariah speaks about her love for her currently incarcerated boyfriend, Young Thug, noting that both she and Thug miss each other dearly. Alongside the "melodic production", YoungBoy "longs for a lover that isn't reciprocating".

== Music video ==
The Isaac Garcia-directed music video released alongside the song sees YoungBoy in his Utah mansion atop a mountain while on house arrest viewing the sunset whereas Mariah is seen in a purple dress on an American football field. The video is described as, "beautifully shot" by critics.

== Personnel ==
Credits and personnel adapted from Tidal.

Musicians

- Samuel Thanni – production, composer, songwriter
- Kendrell Mattox – production, composer, songwriter
- Kentrell DeSean Gaulden – lead artist, songwriter, composer
- Mariah Amani Buckles – lead artist, songwriter, composer
- Josh Joseph – production, composer, songwriter
- Sterling Reynolds – production, composer, songwriter

Technical

- Jason "Cheese" Goldberg – mastering engineer
- Jason "Cheese" Goldberg – mixing engineer
- YoungBoy Never Broke Again – recording engineer

== Charts ==
Chart performance for "Rear View"
Chart (2023)	Peak position
US Hot R&B/Hip-Hop Songs (Billboard)	50
