= Richest Opp =

Mixtape by YoungBoy Never Broke Again
- Released: May 12, 2023
- Genre: Hip-hop; gangsta rap; trap
- Length: 49:04
- Label: Motown; Never Broke Again
- Producer: 17OnDaTrack; 2x.samuel; AMART; Ayo Bleu; BJondatrakk; BrandoBeatz; Chasely; Cheese; D-Roc; Fatboi Beats; G06 Beatz; Jack LoMastro; Jacobsen; jetsonmade; JuniMadedatt; Juppybeats; K10Beatz; K4ProducedIt; Kenoe; Khris James; Lastwordbeats; Mike Wavvs; ProdByBerge; Prodsauceboy; Rashonn D; Simo Fre; Skeeo!; TayTayMadeIt; TnTXD; Uncle Cameron; Wallis Lane; Xclusive; Yo Benji; Zay Tekken

YoungBoy Never Broke Again chronology
Don't Try This at Home (2023)	Richest Opp (2023)	Decided 2 (2023)

Richest Opp is the twentieth solo mixtape by American rapper YoungBoy Never Broke Again, released on May 12, 2023, by Never Broke Again and Motown. The mixtape follows Gaulden's sixth full-length studio album, Don't Try This at Home, released just two weeks prior in April. The mixtape serves as a competitor to Lil Durk's eighth studio album, Almost Healed, which was supposed to be released on the same date, but was pushed back. It features a sole guest appearance from his Never Broke Again signee, NBA Ben 10, alongside production from D-Roc, jetsonmade, Kenoe, Khris James, and Jason "Cheese" Goldberg who mixed, mastered, and recorded the entire record.

Richest Opp received mediocre reviews from music critics who praised the record's vulnerability, however, criticized the production. It debuted at number four on the US Billboard 200, in which it earned 51,000 album-equivalent units, of which 500 were pure album sales. The mixtape also marked YoungBoy's 15th top-10 album in the US.

== Release and promotion ==
On May 4, 2023, media personality DJ Akademiks stated that Gaulden and Lil Durk had reconciled their public beef following several diss tracks and subliminal disses towards one another. Days later, on May 8, Gaulden dissed both Akademiks and Durk through his private Twitter:

Actin' like I give a fuck about numbers. Bitch, I just dropped two weeks ago. This pussy nigga finna drop. Bitch, I ain't worried about no numbers, nigga. Bitch ass nigga, big bank take lil' bank. Your stupid drink face ass. That's all you like to do, bitch, is get drunk and talk shit. That one gon' get you fucked up.

On the same day, he announced a new mixtape titled Richest Opp and its release date of May 12, 2023, the same original release date as Lil Durk's album Almost Healed. YoungBoy later appeared on an Instagram Live video on May 10 while previewing "Bitch Let's Do It" and "I Got That Shit". On May 10, 2023, through the Never Broke Again label page on Instagram, the official tracklist was released. Furthermore, YoungBoy's in-house producer and engineer Jason "Cheese" Goldberg had taken to Instagram to post which songs on the tracklist had been previewed and which were leaked. On May 11, 2023, just a day prior to the mixtape's release, YoungBoy released "Bitch Let's Do It" exclusively to his YouTube channel alongside its official music video; it later appeared on digital streaming platforms alongside the rest of the mixtape.

Upon the release of the mixtape, Gaulden appeared in an interview with XXL Magazine in which he expressed his reasoning for the release of the mixtape while speaking on his feud with Durkand falling out with Akademiks, sales numbers, and the mixtape itself. Gaulden stated that the fuel for the mixtape was the disrespect he felt from the two:

It really wasn’t something that I just had planned. I felt disrespected about something that went on. It was then just for somebody else to be promoted. So I felt like, shit, bitch, don’t play with me. I stay ready. So, I’m just laying down my law and letting a nigga know I’m here to stay. It’s my game and my rules.

== Critical reception ==
Professional ratings
Review scores
Source	Rating
AllMusic	3/5 stars
HipHopDX	3.1/5

Richest Opp received generally favorable reviews from critics. Preezy Brown of Vibe wrote, "As brash and blustering as he can be, YoungBoy's vulnerability cuts through on tracks like 'Hurt My Heart' and 'Dirty Thug,' both of which channels his aggression in the midst of emoting. Richest Opp houses additional firepower such as 'Free Meechy,' 'What You Gonna Do,' 'Slider,' and 'I Want His Soul,' giving listeners an array of anthems to select from." Caleb Hardy of HotNewHipHop wrote "There are a slew of genuinely great choruses from YoungBoy throughout the record" and "Richest Opp begins to falter when it strays away from the core emotion of the record. The more understated, toned-down tracks such as 'Just Flow' and 'I Got That S**t' leave room for the wallpaper production to become increasingly obvious. As a whole, Richest Opp leaves the listener wishing that NBA YoungBoy was in a room of producers looking to take more sonic risks. The more YoungBoy's ominous voice takes over the record, the better. For the record's redundant flaws, fans will likely leave with a handful of personal favorites to keep them satisfied until the next project inevitably rolls around." In addition, he commented that the mixtape was "likely the best we've heard from NBA YoungBoy in 2023". Jayson Buford of Stereogum regarded it as YoungBoy's "best work out of the three" and wrote, "Richest Opp contains some spectacular moments; to listen is to blur the line between shock value and ordinarily stupefied pain."

== Commercial performance ==
Richest Opp debuted at number four on the US Billboard 200 chart, earning 51,000 album-equivalent units [including 1,000 pure sales]. The album also accumulated a total of 74.37 million on-demand streams of the album's songs.

== Track listing ==
Richest Opp track listing
No.	Title	Writer(s)	Producer(s)	Length
1.	"Bitch Let's Do It"	Kentrell Gaulden; Daniel Lebrun; Jasper Cortez; Nathan Chase	Droc; Juppy; Chasely	3:05
2.	"I Got That Shit"	Gaulden; Michael Roberge; Lazerick Seymour	Berge; Zaytekken	2:22
3.	"I Heard"	Gaulden; Kayshaun Mclean; Maurice Jordan; Seth Love	K4; Kenoe; Skeeo!	3:03
4.	"Hurt My Heart"	Gaulden; Roberge; Cameron Hubler	Berge; Uncle Cameron	3:24
5.	"Dirty Thug"	Gaulden; Lebrun; Jeppe Jacobsen	Droc; Jacobsen	3:36
6.	"Just Flow"	Gaulden; Jason Goldberg; Thomas Horton; LaBrandon Robertson	Cheese; TnTXD; Brando	2:37
7.	"Free Meechy"	Gaulden; Lebrun; Roberge; Aaron Hill	Droc; Berge; Lastwordbeats	2:30
8.	"Father"	Gaulden; Goldberg; Braylen Rembert; Cedric McClain, Jr.	Cheese; AyoBleu; FatboiBeats	2:53
9.	"Fuck the Industry Pt. 2"	Gaulden; Roberge	Berge	3:07
10.	"What You Gonna Do"	Gaulden; Lebrun; Sven Steenbergen	Droc; 17ondatrack	2:15
11.	"Perspective"	Gaulden; Goldberg; Tahj Morgan; Michael Washington, Jr.; Jack LoMastro; Nima Jahanbin; Paimon Jahanbin	Cheese; jetsonmade; Mikewavvs; LoMastro; Wallis Lane	2:40
12.	"Chopstick" (featuring NBA Ben 10)	Gaulden; Ben Fields; Lebrun; Cortez; Simone di Franco	Droc; Juppy; Simo Fre	2:56
13.	"Slimes Go Where I Go"	Gaulden; Goldberg; Lebrun; Love	Cheese; Droc; Skeeo!	2:56
14.	"Slider"	Gaulden; Goldberg; Lebrun; Roberge; Hill	Cheese; Droc; Berge; Lastwordbeats	2:28
15.	"I Shot Qupid"	Gaulden; Goldberg; Jerry Robertson; Kalim Pryce; Kyler Mathis	Cheese; JuniMadeDatt; K10Beatz; Prodsauceboy	2:28
16.	"Channel 9"	Gaulden; Jordan; Tavian Carter; Rashonn Henderson	Kenoe; TayTayMadeIt; Rashonn	2:53
17.	"I Want His Soul"	Gaulden; Lebrun; Treevon Walker	Droc; Xclusivemadethis; BJondatrakk; G06beatz	3:43
Total length:				49:04

== Personnel ==
Credits adapted from Tidal.

- Jason "Cheese" Goldberg – mastering (1–17), mixing (1–17), recording (1–6, 8–17)
- YoungBoy Never Broke Again – recording (1–6, 9, 10, 12)
- Samuel "Khris James XO" Thanni – recording (7)

== Charts ==
=== Weekly charts ===
Weekly chart performance for Richest Opp
Chart (2023)	Peak position
US Billboard 200	4
US Top R&B/Hip-Hop Albums (Billboard)	1

=== Year-end charts ===
Year-end chart performance for Richest Opp
Chart (2023)	Position
US Top R&B/Hip-Hop Albums (Billboard)	72
