= J.Oliver =

American record producer

- Also known as: Fresh Ayr
- Born: Jeffery Oliver Robinson; Baltimore, Maryland, U.S.
- Genres: Hip hop; trap; R&B; urban; dance; country; latin; reggaeton
- Occupations: Record producer; songwriter; rapper

Jeffery Robinson (born December 16, 1991), better known by his stage names J. Oliver or Fresh Ayr is an American record producer from Baltimore, Maryland.

== Life and career ==
J.Oliver was born and raised in Baltimore, Maryland, where he graduated from Cardinal Gibbons High School and earned a bachelor's degree from Morgan State University.

J.Oliver has produced music for artists across a diverse array of genres. He has produced music for Post Malone, YoungBoy Never Broke Again, Eminem, Meek Mill, Kid Laroi, Lil Baby, Anuel AA, Gunna & Young Thug. He produced YoungBoy Never Broke Again's What You Say W/ Post Malone and Kid Laroi, Gunna's “Alright", Meek Mill's “FYM” & "Cream", Anuel AA’s “ Antes Y Despues", Ñengo Flow's Sur y norte, to PGF Nuk and EST Gee “Not Opps” and Young Thug's "Like". He has also produced for R&B artists Trey Songz, Sammie and Armon & Trey as well as Yung Bleu.

Recently, J.Oliver has expanded from production into songwriting, penning "Push it on me" by Kevin Hart, Trey Songz, Bogus Charms, Rick Ross, and Meek Mill, along with major record labels Universal, Atlantic Records, Universal Motown Records, APG, RCA Records, Epic Records as well Interscope Records. J.Oliver is an artist and performer as well. He has shared the stage with Nelly, 2-Chainz, Big Sean, Yo Gotti, Waka Flocka, Mack Wilds, Trae Tha Truth, Chris Brown, as well as Rae Sremmurd.

== Producer discography ==
Title	Artist	Details
Doing You Well	King Los ft Devin Cruise	Album - Becoming King
Why You Mad	King Los	Album - Becoming King
Becoming King	King Los	Album - Becoming King
Play Too Rough	King Los	Album - Becoming King
I Told Em	French Montana	Album - Excuse My French
Miss Your Sex	Raheem Devaughn	Album - Love Sex Passion
Loyalty	Tsu Surf X Jadakiss	Mixtape - Newark
Just A Taste	Tinashe	Mixtape - Black Water
Right Now	Bay Bay ft. Kevin Gates x Kirko Bangz x Ant Bangz	
Ain't Me	Meek Mill ft Yo Gotti	Mixtape - Dreamchasers 3
Doin' Me	Trae Tha Truth ft. Nipsey Hussle x Lil Bibby	Album - Tha Truth
I Can't Feel You	Trae Tha Truth ft. Ink	Album - Tha Truth
Determined	Trae Tha Truth	Album - Tha Truth
Who They Got A Problem With	Trae Tha Truth ft. Yo Gotti	Album - Tha Truth, Pt. 2
Head Turner	Trina	Album - Back To Business
Ain't Me	Meek Mill ft. Yo Gotti x Omelly	Mixtape - Dreamchasers 3
Gave Em Hope (50 Cent Diss)	Meek Mill	Mixtape - DC4
Wrong Places	King Los ft. Eric Bellinger	
Ice Cream (freestyle)	Meek Mill	
Fuck You Mean	Meek Mill ft Boosie Bad AZz	
Push It On me	Trey Songz x Kevin Hart	Album - Kevin Hart: What Now? (The Mixtape Presents Chocolate Droppa)
All I Wanna Do	Kirko Bangz	Album - Progression 3
Old Ways	Kirko Bangz	Album - Progression 3
Put Em Up	Jay Park x Ugly Duck	Mixtape - Scene Stealers
Dope Dealer	King Los ft. Wiz khalifa & Lola Monroe	Mixtape - The 410 Survival KitEv
Full Time Trapper	King Los ft. Yo Gotti x O.T. Genasis	Mixtape - The 410 Survival Kit
Dance With Me	Chad Focus ft. Tpain x Raeliss	
M.A.T.A. (Make America Trap Again)	Kevin Gates	Mixtape - Luca Brasi 3
Splash	SiAngie Twins ft. DreamDoll	
Times 10	Sammie Ft Lil Baby	Album - Everlasting
Rainy Days	Boogie x Eminem	Album - Everythings for Sale
Switch	Coi Leray x Dice Soho	
Just In Case	Ar’mon & Trey ft Yung Bleu	
I Am	TV Gucci	
Bogus Charms (Co-Writer)	Rick Ross ft Meek Mill	Album - Port of Miami 2
Everything You Do	YK Osiris	Album - The Golden Child
Lil Quita	Trapboy Freddy	
Ride For Me	Mo3	
Sur Y Norte	Nengo Flow ft. Anuel AA	Album - The Goat
Antes Y Después	Anuel AA ft. Yandel, Kendo Kaponi, Nengo Flow	Album - Emmanuel
Tug Of War	Trey Songz	Album - Back Home
Mr. Pyrex man	Benny the Butcher	Mixtape - Long Live DJ Shay (with Black Soprano Family)
Not Opps	PGF Nuk ft EST Gee	Album - Switch Music
Casa Freak Hoes	Tory Lanez	Album - Sorry 4 What
Unfollow Me	Pressa (rapper)	
What You Say	YoungBoy Never Broke Again ft Post Malone and the Kid Laroi	Album - Don't Try This at Home
Alright	Gunna	Album - A Gift & a Curse
Shaq & Kobe	Rick Ross & Meek Mill	Album - Too Good to Be True
Hood Grammy	4Batz	Non-Album Single
Mortal Kombat	4Batz	Non-Album Single
Trap Star	Trapboy Freddy ft. HeadHuncho Amir	Album - Freddy B
Stitch Me Up	Summer Walker	Album - Finally Over It
