= Tha Truth, Pt. 2 =

Studio album by Trae tha Truth
- Released: February 5, 2016
- Recorded: 2015–16
- Genre: Hip hop
- Length: 66:21
- Label: ABN; Grand Hustle; Empire

Trae tha Truth chronology
Tha Truth (2015)	Tha Truth, Pt. 2 (2016)	Tha Truth, Pt. 3 (2017)

Singles from Tha Truth, Pt. 2
- 1. "Takers" Released: December 14, 2015; 2. "All Good" Released: January 3, 2016; 3. "Slugs" Released: January 27, 2016

Tha Truth, Pt. 2 is the eighth studio album by American rapper Trae tha Truth. The album was released on February 5, 2016, by ABN Entertainment, Grand Hustle Records and Empire Distribution.

== Track listing ==
No.	Title	Producer(s)	Length
1.	"Intro" (featuring Lil Duval)	Watson the Great	2:17
2.	"Crazy"	Watson the Great	4:12
3.	"Takers" (featuring Quentin Miller)	S Dot; Soot J Cash	3:29
4.	"Spray" (featuring Jay'Ton)	Nick Miles	3:54
5.	"Slugs" (featuring Young Thug)	Club Cadet	4:26
6.	"Who Dey Rockin' Wit" (featuring Yo Gotti)	J. Oliver	3:14
7.	"My Niggaz" (featuring Ty Dolla Sign)	S Dot	4:24
8.	"All Good" (featuring Rick Ross, T.I., and Audio Push)	Watson the Great	3:35
9.	"Let Me Live" (featuring B.o.B, T.I., and Ink)	Watson the Great	4:57
10.	"Fuck tha World" (featuring D. Lylez)	Bizness Boi	4:09
11.	"It's Time"	Renegadez	3:12
12.	"Work"	Bizness Boi	3:44
13.	"Thirsty" (featuring Wiz Khalifa and Roscoe Dash)	Watson the Great	3:35
14.	"Fuck wit Me" (featuring Ink)	Bizness Boi; Loco Los	3:36
15.	"Mama" (featuring J-Dawg and Watch the Duck)	Watch the Duck	5:28
16.	"World Needs You" (featuring Liz Rodrigues)	Megaman; The Maven Boys	3:52
17.	"I Will Survive"	Watson the Great	4:17

== Personnel ==
Credits for Tha Truth, Pt. 2 adapted from AllMusic.

- B.o.B — featured artist
- Bizness Boi — producer
- Club Cadet — producer
- Soot J Cash — producer
- Roscoe Dash — featured artist
- S Dot — producer
- Ink — featured artist, producer
- J-Dawg — featured artist
- Jay'Ton — featured artist
- D. Lylez — featured artist
- The Maven Boys — producer
- Megaman — producer
- Nick Miles — producer
- Quentin Miller — featured artist
- J. Oliver — producer
- Liz Rodrigues — featured artist
- Rick Ross — featured artist
- Miguel Scott — mastering
- T.I. — executive producer
- Trae tha Truth — executive producer, primary artist
- Ty Dolla Sign — featured artist
- Watch the Duck — featured artist, producer
- Watson the Great — engineer, mixing, producer
- Wiz Khalifa — featured artist
- Yo Gotti — featured artist
- Young Thug — featured artist

== Charts ==
Chart (2016)	Peak position
US Top R&B/Hip-Hop Albums (Billboard)	30
US Independent Albums (Billboard)	17
