= Bitch Let's Do It =

2023 song by YoungBoy Never Broke Again

Song by YoungBoy Never Broke Again

from the album Richest Opp
- Released: May 12, 2023
- Length: 3:05
- Label: Motown; Never Broke Again
- Songwriters: Kentrell Gaulden; Daniel Lebrun; Jasper Cortez; Nathan Chase
- Producers: Droc; Juppy; Chasely

Music video
- "Bitch Let's Do It" on YouTube

"Bitch Let's Do It" is a song by American rapper YoungBoy Never Broke Again and the opening track from his mixtape Richest Opp (2023). It was produced by Droc, Juppy and Chasely.

== Composition ==
The song features YoungBoy rapping in a lively manner over an "aggressive" beat containing "dancing" piano keys. Lyrically, he takes subliminal shots at rapper Lil Durk and podcaster DJ Akademiks, and talks about his "drug and firearm dependency" and his connection to several murders.

== Critical reception ==
Noah Grant of HotNewHipHop gave the song a "Very Hottttt" rating. In a review of Richest Opp, Jayson Buford of Stereogum wrote, "As usual, the antics on song[s] like 'Fuck the Industry Pt. 2' (more on that momentarily) makes the slick songwriting and cotton-candy sweet Louisiana cadence on 'Bitch Let's Do It' feel inconsequential."

== Music video ==
An official music video was released on May 11, 2023. It shows NBA YoungBoy "strutting around" in his home in Utah.

== Charts ==
Chart performance for "Bitch Let's Do It"
Chart (2023)	Peak position
US Billboard Hot 100	62
US Hot R&B/Hip-Hop Songs (Billboard)	17

== Certifications ==
Region	Certification	Certified units/sales
United States (RIAA)	Platinum	1,000,000^{‡}
^{‡} Sales+streaming figures based on certification alone.
