= Fuck the Industry Pt. 2 =

2023 song by YoungBoy Never Broke Again

Song by YoungBoy Never Broke Again

from the album Richest Opp
- Released: May 12, 2023
- Length: 3:07
- Label: Motown; Never Broke Again
- Songwriters: Kentrell Gaulden; Michael Roberge
- Producer: Berge

"Fuck the Industry Pt. 2" is a song by American rapper YoungBoy Never Broke Again from his mixtape Richest Opp (2023). Produced by Berge, it is a diss track toward a number of rappers.

== Content ==
NBA YoungBoy targets several rappers in the lyrics. First, he criticizes Drake after YoungBoy's brother OG 3Three ran into Drake in September 2021 and in October 2021, in an interview he confirmed a collaboration between the two of them was in the works, but because of his friendship with Lil Durk (who has a feud with YoungBoy) it didn't happen: "Talked to Drake 'cross FaceTime, he wasn't feelin' me / Told me that he fuck with Durk, damn, that shit gettin' to me / Told me that he like the shit I'm doin', but can't do shit with me". Additionally, he calls Drake a "bitch" and his enemy. YoungBoy then calls out J. Cole for ghosting him after he missed a studio session with him, despite their plans to collaborate: "J a ho, that nigga played it cold like he was gon' do a feature / So I texted his line a muscle sign, I swear it's gon' be nice to meet you". Later, YoungBoy calls Lil Yachty a "faggot" and references his former relationship with JT of City Girls. In addition, YoungBoy takes aim at music executive James Prince, who helped Drake in signing to Young Money Entertainment and had an issue with him in June 2020 when somebody stole some items from his home in Houston, but later on he got them back.

== Critical reception ==
In a review of Richest Opp, Jayson Buford of Stereogum wrote, "As usual, the antics on song[s] like 'Fuck The Industry Pt. 2' (more on that momentarily) makes the slick songwriting and cotton-candy sweet Louisiana cadence on 'Bitch Let's Do It' feel inconsequential."

== Charts ==
Chart performance for "Fuck the Industry Pt. 2"
Chart (2023)	Peak position
US Billboard Hot 100	87
US Hot R&B/Hip-Hop Songs (Billboard)	28
