= Tha Truth =

Studio album by Trae tha Truth
- Released: July 24, 2015
- Recorded: 2014–15
- Genre: Hip hop
- Length: 62:30
- Labels: ABN; Grand Hustle; Empire
- Producers: Watson the Great; J. Cole; Black Metaphor; League of Starz; Jae the Giant; J. Oliver; Bizness Boi; MIZFITSOUNDZ; G-Money; Fresh Beats; Ben Didelot; Johnny Juliano

Trae tha Truth chronology
Street King (2011)	Tha Truth (2015)	Tha Truth, Pt. 2 (2016)

Singles from Tha Truth
- 1. "I Don't Give a Fuck" Released: June 9, 2015; 2. "Tricken Every Car I Get" Released: July 3, 2015

Tha Truth is the seventh studio album by American rapper Trae tha Truth. It was released on July 24, 2015, by ABN Entertainment, Grand Hustle Records and Empire Distribution. Tha Truth serves as his first release under the Grand Hustle Records. The production on the album was provided by J. Cole, Jae the Giant, and League of Starz; as well as the album features guest appearances from his label-mate T.I., along with several other artists such as Nipsey Hussle, Jeremih, and Ty Dolla Sign, among others.

== Background ==
In March 2012, Trae tha Truth signed a recording contract to Atlanta-based rapper T.I.'s Grand Hustle Records imprint. In March 2013, Trae revealed that the title to the album would be called Banned. On March 17, 2015, Trae tha Truth revealed that his seventh album would be a double album, called Tha Truth. He also unveiled the album's cover art, while revealing that this album would be released on June 22, 2015. However, the album was delayed, along with the changes on the album cover.

== Singles ==
"I Don't Give a Fuck" was released as the album's first single via digital distribution on June 9, 2015. The song features guest verse from a fellow American rapper Rick Ross, with the production by Jae the Giant.

The album's second single, "Tricken Every Car I Get" was released on July 3, 2015. The song features guest verses from these American rappers Future and Boosie Badazz, with the production by League of Starz. On July 24, the music video for "Tricken Every Car I Get", featuring Future and Boosie Badazz, directed by Philly Fly Boy, premiered on WorldStarHipHop.

== Track listing ==
No.	Title	Producer(s)	Length
1.	"Intro" (featuring Lil Duval)	Watson the Great	2:10
2.	"Tricken Every Car I Get" (featuring Future and Boosie Badazz)	League of Starz	3:46
3.	"I Don't Give a Fuck" (featuring Rick Ross)	Jae the Giant	3:45
4.	"Doin' Me" (featuring Nipsey Hussle and Lil Bibby)	Fresh Ayr; MIZFITSOUNDZ	5:07
5.	"Why"	G-Money	4:01
6.	"Never Knew" (featuring Snootie Wild and Que)	Jae the Giant	4:23
7.	"Late Night King" (featuring Jeremih, Ty Dolla Sign, and T.I.)	Fresh Beats; Watson the Great	3:57
8.	"Children of Men" (featuring J. Cole and Ink)	J. Cole	4:11
9.	"Book of Life"	Bizness Boi	3:22
10.	"Trying to Figure It Out" (featuring Ink)	Watson the Great	4:00
11.	"Determined"	Fresh Ayr; MIZFITSOUNDZ	3:27
12.	"Yeah Hoe" (featuring Problem and Lil Boss)	League of Start	3:18
13.	"Criminals" (featuring Rich Homie Quan and Dion Primo)	Watson the Great; Johnny Juliano	4:13
14.	"What tha Fuck is You On"	Watson the Great	3:49
15.	"I Can't Feel You" (featuring Ink)	Fresh Ayr; Watson the Great; Ben Didelot	4:49
16.	"Realigion" (featuring Dej Loaf)	Black Metaphor	4:10
Total length:			62:30

== Charts ==
Chart (2015)	Peak position
US Billboard 200	165
US Independent Albums (Billboard)	17
US Top R&B/Hip-Hop Albums (Billboard)	15
US Top Rap Albums (Billboard)	11
