= Everythings for Sale =

2019 album by American rapper Westside Boogie

Studio album by Boogie
- Released: January 25, 2019
- Recorded: 2018–19
- Genre: Hip hop
- Length: 38:58
- Label: Shady; Interscope
- Producer: Ashton McCreight; C. Ballin; Chris Blakk; Chris McCleaney; Dart; Fresh Ayr; Good Lineage Music; Gwen Bunn; Jeff Gitelman; Keyel; Mario Luciano; Mark Raggio; Moses Elias; Nabeyin; Ollie Chanin; Ryan Feinberg; S1; Sean Matsukawa; Shaé Universe; Streetrunner; Teej

Boogie chronology
| Thirst 48, Pt. II (2016) | Everythings for Sale (2019) | More Black Superheroes (2022) |

Singles from Everythings for Sale
- 1. "Self Destruction" Released: May 25, 2018; 2. "Silent Ride" Released: January 9, 2019

Everythings for Sale [sic] is the debut studio album by American rapper Boogie. It was released on January 25, 2019, by Shady Records, Interscope Records. The album includes guest appearances from 6lack, Christian Scott, Eminem, JID, and Snoh Aalegra, with production mainly coming from Keyel, Jeff Gitelman, and Dart, among others.

== Promotion ==
On January 23, 2019, Boogie released a short-film for the album, produced by Riley Keough, Gina Gammell, and Malcolm Washington. The idea came when Boogie was discussing what each song would look visually.

=== Singles ===
The album's first single, called "Self Destruction" was released on May 25, 2018.

The album's second single, called "Silent Ride" was released on January 9, 2019.

=== Promotional singles ===
The album's promotional single, called "Deja Vu" was released for digital download on August 29, 2018, one day before his 29th birthday. The song was produced by Keyel and Sean Matsukawa.

== Critical reception ==
Professional ratings
Aggregate scores
| Source | Rating |
|---|---|
| Metacritic | 82/100 |
Review scores
| Source | Rating |
| AllMusic | 4/5 stars |
| Exclaim! | 8/10 |
| HipHopDX | 4.2/5 |
| Pitchfork | 7.1/10 |
| The 405 | 8.5/10 |
| XXL | 4/5 |

Upon its release, the album received a widespread critical acclaim. Aaron McKrell of HipHopDX gave the album 4.2 out of 5, claiming it was "worth fans' patience" and an effective introduction to "a troubled young man with a brilliant mind whose musings are starkly engaging". Trey Alston from Pitchfork said "The Compton rapper's debut is smart, technically dazzling, and thoroughly sullen". In a one-listen review, Yoh Phillips from DJBooth said "Boogie reminds me of a film director who is able to turn every actor before their lens into a character that the audience feel as if they know personally". The album was positively received by Complex Media's morning debate show "Everyday Struggle". The album's maturity and features were particularly well-liked. XXL Magazine lauded Boogie's no holds barred brand of self awareness, noting "He doesn’t have it all figured out. He gets sad and angry and knows he needs to improve". The publication gave the album an "XL" on a "S" to "XXL" scale.

== Commercial performance ==
The album debuted at number 28 on the US Billboard 200 and number 18 on the US Top R&B/Hip-Hop Albums chart, selling 18,397 album-equivalent units in its first week.

== Track listing ==
Credits adapted from Tidal, BMI, ASCAP, AllMusic, and UMPG.

| No. | Title | Writer(s) | Producer(s) | Length |
|---|---|---|---|---|
| 1. | "Tired / Reflections" | Anthony Dixson; Keyel Walker; Jeffrey Gitelman; Oliver Chanin; Moussa "Moses" Elias; Gwendolyn Bunn; Sharon "Shaé Universe" Ogo-Uzodike | Keyel; Jeff Gitelman; Chanin; Moses Elias; Gwen Bunn; Shaé Universe | 4:01 |
| 2. | "Silent Ride" | Dixson; Walker; Gitelman | Keyel; Gitelman | 2:50 |
| 3. | "Swap Meet" | Dixson; Walker; Gitelman; Ryan Feinberg; Mark Raggio | Keyel; Gitelman; Feinberg; Raggio | 2:26 |
| 4. | "Lolsmh (Interlude)" | Dixson; Walker; Gitelman; Christopher McClenney | Keyel; Gitelman; McClenney | 4:15 |
| 5. | "Soho" (featuring JID) | Dixson; Destin Route; Afolabi "Teej" Osinulu; Walker; Gitelman | Teej; Keyel; Gitelman | 2:13 |
| 6. | "Skydive" | Dixson; Darttny Ellis; Walker; Gitelman; Sean Matsukawa | Dart; Keyel; Gitelman; Matsukawa | 3:29 |
| 7. | "Live 95" | Dixson; Edgar "Nabeyin" Panford; Walker; Gitelman; Chris "C. Ballin" Jackson; Brian Gulland | Nabeyin; Keyel; Gitelman; C. Ballin | 2:15 |
| 8. | "Rainy Days" (featuring Eminem) | Dixson; Marshall Mathers; Nicholas "Streetrunner" Warwar; Tarik Azzouz; Larry Griffin, Jr.; Jeffery "Fresh Ayr" Robinson; Maxime Breton; Walker; Gitelman | Streetrunner; Azzouz; S1; Fresh Ayr; Good Lineage Music; Keyel; Gitelman | 3:54 |
| 9. | "Skydive II" (featuring 6lack) | Dixson; Ricardo Valentine; Ellis; Walker; Gitelman | Dart; Keyel; Gitelman | 2:53 |
| 10. | "Whose Fault" (featuring Christian Scott) | Dixson; Christian Scott; Ellis; Walker; Gitelman; Chris "Blakk" Daniels; Kolseta Moore | Dart; Keyel; Gitelman; Scott; Chris Blakk | 3:10 |
| 11. | "No Warning" (featuring Shaé Universe) | Dixson; Ogo-Uzodike; Ellis; Walker; Gitelman | Dart; Keyel; Gitelman | 2:21 |
| 12. | "Self Destruction" | Dixson; Asthon McCreight; Mario "Luciano" Dragoi; Walker; Gitelman; Ellis | McCreight; Mario Luciano; Keyel; Gitelman; Dart | 2:40 |
| 13. | "Time" (featuring Snoh Aalegra) | Dixson; Snoh Nowrozi; McCleaney; Walker; Gitelman; Elias | McCleaney; Keyel; Gitelman; Moses Elias | 2:25 |
| Total length: | | | | 38:59 |

== Charts ==
| Chart (2019) | Peak position |
|---|---|
| Canadian Albums (Billboard) | 61 |
| Dutch Albums (Album Top 100) | 133 |
| UK R&B Albums (OCC) | 16 |
| US Billboard 200 | 28 |
| US Top R&B/Hip-Hop Albums (Billboard) | 18 |

== See also ==
- 2019 in hip hop music
