= Worth It (YK Osiris song) =

2019 single by YK Osiris

Single by YK Osiris

from the album The Golden Child
- Released: February 8, 2019
- Genre: R&B
- Length: 3:09
- Label: Universal Music Group; Def Jam Recordings
- Songwriters: MGeeZy; Piper; KC Supreme; Sean Momberger; Taz Taylor; Kiwi; Travis Mills; Orlando Woods Jr.; Melvin Goggins Jr.; Osiris Williams
- Producers: MGeeZy; Momberger; Supreme; Piper; Taylor; Kiwi; Mills

YK Osiris singles chronology
"Secrets" (2019)	"Worth It" (2019)	"Freaky Dancer" (2019)

Music video
- "Worth It" on YouTube

"Worth It" is a song by American singer and rapper YK Osiris, released on February 8, 2019 by Universal Music Group and Def Jam Recordings. It was sent to urban contemporary radio & rhythmic contemporary radio on March 11, 2019. It served as the second single from his debut studio album, The Golden Child. "Worth It" became his first song to hit the Billboard Hot 100, debuting at 87 and peaking at 48.

The remix of the song, featuring fellow singers Tory Lanez and Ty Dolla $ign, also appeared on The Golden Child along with the original version.

== Charts ==
=== Weekly charts ===
Chart (2019)	Peak position
Canada Hot 100 (Billboard)	87
US Billboard Hot 100	48
US Hot R&B/Hip-Hop Songs (Billboard)	18
US R&B/Hip-Hop Airplay (Billboard)	13
US Rhythmic Airplay (Billboard)	8
US Rolling Stone Top 100	74

=== Year-end charts ===
Chart (2019)	Position
US Billboard Hot 100	77
US Hot R&B/Hip-Hop Songs (Billboard)	33
US Rhythmic (Billboard)	35
US Rolling Stone Top 100	89

== Certifications ==
Certifications for Worth It
Region	Certification	Certified units/sales
United Kingdom (BPI)	Gold	400,000^{‡}
United States (RIAA)	3× Platinum	3,000,000^{‡}
^{‡} Sales+streaming figures based on certification alone.
