= No Child Left Behind (song) =

Song by Kanye West featuring Vory

from the album Donda
- Released: August 29, 2021
- Recorded: May 13 – August 2021
- Length: 2:58
- Label: GOOD; Def Jam
- Songwriters: Kanye West; Tavoris Hollins; Jahmal Gwin; Mike Lévy; Jahshua Brown; Douglas Brown; Frankie Smith
- Producers: Kanye West; BoogzDaBeast; Cashmere Brown; Gesaffelstein

"No Child Left Behind" is a song by American rapper Kanye West from his tenth studio album, Donda (2021). The song includes vocals from fellow American rapper Vory. It was performed by the Sunday Service Choir on Halloween 2021, with additional contributions from Justin Bieber. In July 2021, the song was used in a Beats by Dre commercial during Game 6 of the NBA Finals, which stars Sha'Carri Richardson.

== Background ==
During Donda's first public listening event at Mercedes-Benz Stadium in Atlanta on July 22, 2021, "No Child Left Behind" was previewed by West, with vocals from Vory, but was previously previewed as a one-minute snippet in a Beats by Dre commercial featuring Sha'Carri Richardson, prior to the listening party. In the commercial, West suggested that the album would be released on July 23, and the ad would also air at the NBA Finals. Shortly after the commercial aired, French producer Gesaffelstein stated that he had produced the song.

Speaking to XXL about working with West, Vory mentioned the faith the rapper has put in him musically, explaining that they are understanding of one another while saying their "vibe is crazy". Vory detailed that even West's childhood friends recognize the vibe, saying of them collaborating, "You would think y'all have known each other for years." The rapper recalled that West originally set out to create an entirely different song titled "Never Abandon Your Child", until he told him to use a different saying of the same meaning, specifying that a quote would be preferable. Vory also stated that West advised him to gain a proper fanbase by putting careful thought into creating a discography, rather than gathering popularity via gimmicks or internet skills.

== Release and promotion ==
On August 29, 2021, "No Child Left Behind" was included as the 23rd track on West's 10th studio album Donda, while it stands as the last track before the second versions of songs. A collaboration with West and athlete Sha'Carri Richardson for Game 6 of the 2021 NBA Finals was teased via Beats by Dre's Twitter account on July 20, 2021, with the account mentioning the game number alongside tagging West and Richardson. That same day, a Beats by Dre commercial that stars Richardson and was edited by West premiered during Game Six of the finals, scored by a one-minute excerpt of "No Child Left Behind", marking one of the first snippets from the album. For the conclusion of the second Donda listening event at Mercedes-Benz Stadium on August 5, 2021, the song was played as West rose to the ceiling by harness, in a manner that was described by Variety as resembling an ascent to heaven.

On October 31, 2021, West's group the Sunday Service Choir performed a gospel rendition of the song as the opener for their Halloween concert at an undisclosed rooftop location. During the performance, Canadian singer Justin Bieber contributed harmonies.

== Charts ==
=== Weekly charts ===
Chart performance for "No Child Left Behind"
Chart (2021)	Peak position
Australia (ARIA)	31
Canada Hot 100 (Billboard)	42
Denmark (Tracklisten)	38
France (SNEP)	117
Global 200 (Billboard)	42
Iceland (Tónlistinn)	17
Lithuania (AGATA)	40
Norway (VG-lista)	29
Portugal (AFP)	63
South Africa (TOSAC)	15
Sweden (Sverigetopplistan)	36
US Billboard Hot 100	53
US Hot Christian Songs (Billboard)	15
US Gospel Songs (Billboard)	15

=== Year-end charts ===
2021 year-end chart performance for "No Child Left Behind"
Chart (2021)	Position
US Christian Songs (Billboard)	55
US Gospel Songs (Billboard)	19

== Certifications ==
Certifications for "No Child Left Behind"
Region	Certification	Certified units/sales
United States (RIAA)	Gold	500,000^{‡}
^{‡} Sales+streaming figures based on certification alone.
