= Vory =

American rapper and singer (born 1997)

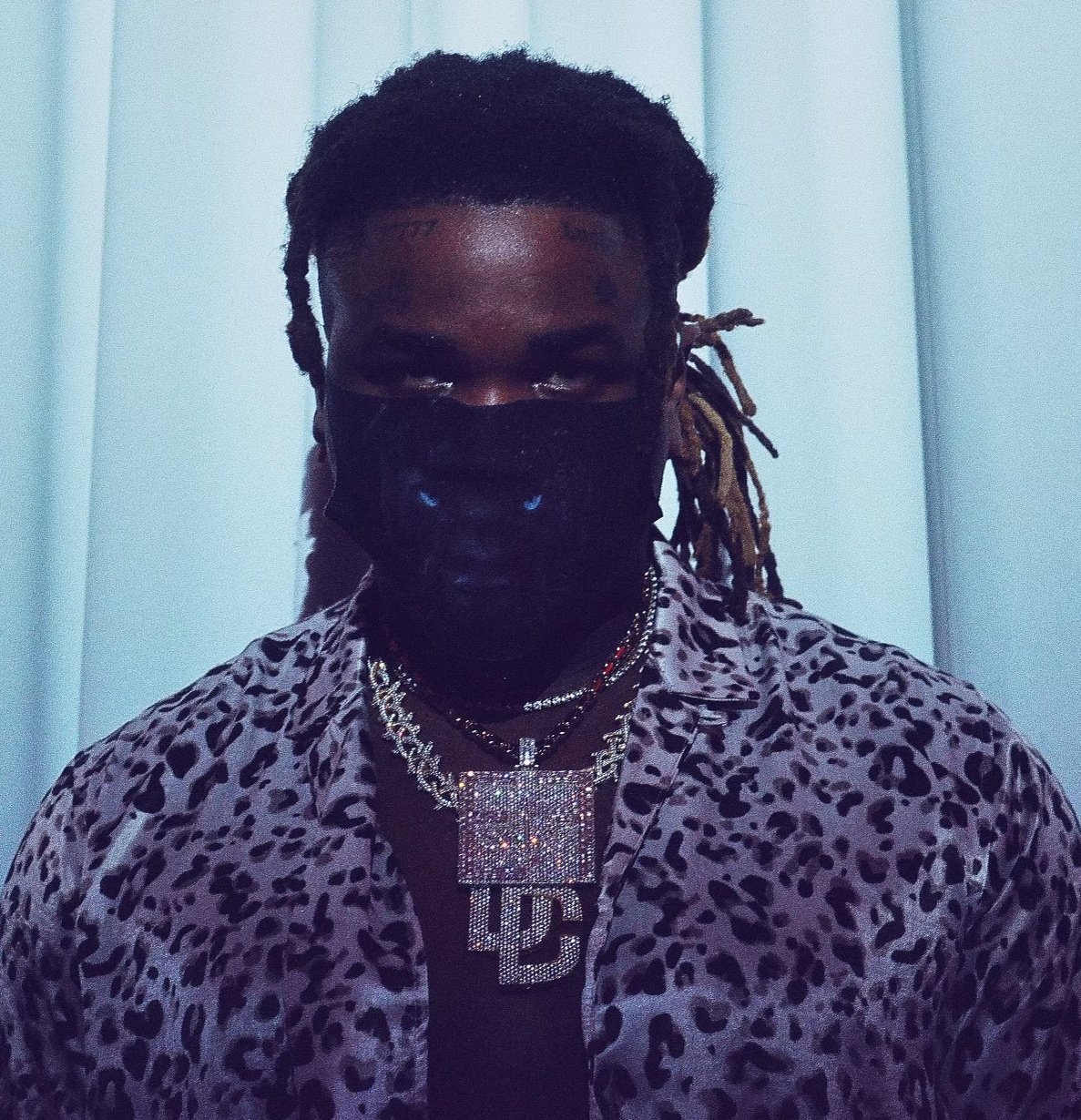
- Vory in 2021

Background information
- Also known as: King Vory
- Born: Tavoris Javon Hollins Jr. August 18, 1997 (age 29); Houston, Texas, U.S.
- Origin: Louisville, Kentucky, U.S.
- Genres: R&B; hip hop
- Occupations: Rapper; singer; songwriter
- Works: Vory discography
- Years active: 2015–present
- Labels: Electric Feel; Capitol; Dream Chasers (former)
- Website: shopvorymerch.com

Tavoris Javon Hollins Jr. (born August 18, 1997), known professionally as Vory (formerly King Vory), is an American rapper, singer and songwriter. Raised in Louisville, Kentucky, he is best known for his guest appearances on Kanye West's 2021 songs "God Breathed", "Jonah" (alongside Lil Durk) and "No Child Left Behind" — all of which appear on West's tenth album, Donda. His contributions to the album earned him nominations for Best Rap Album and Album of the Year at the 64th Annual Grammy Awards.

As a lead artist, Hollins began his recording in 2015 and signed with Capitol Records and Electric Feel Entertainment in 2018. He entered a joint venture with Meek Mill's record label, Dream Chasers Records in 2020. His debut studio album, Lost Souls (2022), was met with positive critical reception despite failing to chart. He parted ways with Meek Mill and Dream Chasers in 2024.

Having first gained success as a songwriter, Hollins won a Grammy Award for his work on the Carters' album Everything Is Love (2018). He has also co-written the singles "Don't" (2015) by fellow Kentucky-based singer Bryson Tiller, and "Mob Ties" (2018) by Canadian rapper Drake, both of which peaked at number 13 on the Billboard Hot 100. In 2022, he co-wrote Lil Baby's song "Forever", which peaked within the chart's top ten.

== Early life ==
Hollins was born and raised in Houston, Texas. He later moved to Louisville, Kentucky, at age 16 to live with his father. While there, he met and began collaborating with singer and Louisville native, Bryson Tiller. Vory was initially signed to the Louisville-based record label, FPR Music Group, from 2016 to 2018.

== Career ==
Hollins began his career working behind the scenes as a songwriter. In 2015, he first received attention after his guest appearance on fellow Kentucky-based recording artist Bryson Tiller's song "Break Bread", under his former stage name King Vory. In 2017, Vory co-wrote his hit song "Don't", which peaked at number 13 on the Billboard Hot 100 while he guest performed on its parent album Trapsoul (2017). In 2016, Vory began independently releasing songs, including "Overdose" and "My Life A Movie" featuring Blu and produced by Dun Deal. Later in July 2016, FPR Music Group released his debut mixtape, Overdose.

After moving to Los Angeles, California, Hollins met Canadian record producer Boi-1da, with whom he would later collaborate on a number of songs. Throughout 2017, Vory continued releasing singles, including "Try", "Do That Shit", and "Hold of Me". The latter song was premiered by Zane Lowe on Beats 1 Radio. In 2018, he earned writing credits on numerous songs including Canadian rapper Drake's "Mob Ties" from his fifth studio album Scorpion and American duo The Carters' "Friends" from their collaborate studio album Everything Is Love, which would go on to win a Grammy for his work on the album.

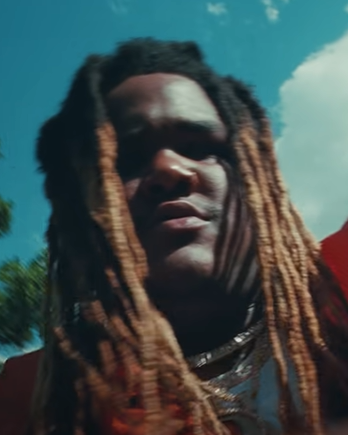
Vory in a 2021 JD Sports commercial

In August 2018, Hollins signed to Capitol Records and Electric Feel Management and released his debut EP, Lucky Me. He guest featured on Rich the Kid's song "Ring Ring" from his second studio album The World Is Yours 2, which was released on March 22, 2019; Hollins released his single, "You Got It" on the same day. In June 2020, he signed to a joint venture with Meek Mill's Dream Chasers Records and released an eponymous extended play in January of that year. The following year, Hollins made three guest appearances on Kanye West's tenth studio album Donda (2021) — on the tracks "God Breathed", "Jonah", and "No Child Left Behind". He would also contribute on the album's sequel, Donda 2 (2022), providing sole vocals on the track "Lord Lift Me Up". Donda 2 would be released onto streaming services in April 2025, with one of five new tracks, "Jesse", crediting Hollins as a co-writer.

In April 2022, Hollins guest featured alongside Polo G on the song "Changed on Me" from rapper Fivio Foreign's debut album, B.I.B.L.E.. In June of that year, Hollins released his debut album, Lost Souls, featuring guest appearances from Kanye West, Nav, Beam, and Yung Bleu, among others. In October of that year, he co-wrote the hit song "Forever" for Lil Baby and Fridayy.

In February 2024, security camera footage of Vory was leaked in which he threatened to kill his girlfriend. Following this, label boss Meek Mill immediately disassociated with the singer and terminated his recording contract, stating that he has a "mental problem."

In December 2026, Vory is set to appear on American rapper 2 Chainz's tenth studio album, Playaz Only Live Once.

== Discography ==
Studio albums

- Lost Souls (2022)
- You Made Me This Way (2025)

== Awards ==
Year	Award	Category	Nominee(s)	Result
2019	Grammy Award	Best Urban Contemporary Album	Everything Is Love by The Carters (co-writer of "Friends")	Won
2019	Grammy Award	Album of the Year	Scorpion by Drake (co-writer of "Mob Ties")	Nominated
