= Lil Snupe =

American rapper (1995–2013)

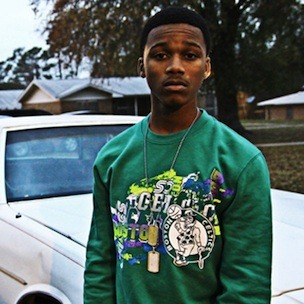
- Lil Snupe in January 2012
- Born: Addarren La Keith Ross; June 13, 1995; Jonesboro, Louisiana, U.S.
- Died: June 20, 2013 (aged 18); Winnfield, Louisiana, U.S.
- Cause of death: Gunshot wounds
- Occupations: Rapper; songwriter
- Agent: DJ Smallz
- Musical career
- Genres: Hip hop; trap
- Instrument: Vocals
- Years active: 2012–2013
- Label: Dream Chasers

Addarren La Keith Ross (/ˈædærən/; June 13, 1995 – June 20, 2013), known professionally as Lil Snupe, was an American rapper from Jonesboro, Louisiana signed to Meek Mill's record label Dream Chasers Records. His death at a young age was honored by several hip hop musicians and made him the subject of numerous musical tributes and documentaries.

== Early life ==
Addarren Ross was born on June 13, 1995 in Jonesboro, Louisiana. He was raised in Jonesboro, primarily by his mother Denesha Chester. His father, Charlie Brown, was incarcerated for most of his life, and at the time of his death, his father was released.

According to testimony by a family friend, Lil Snupe's mother had him when she was approximately 14 or 15 years old. According to accounts by Lil Snupe's mother Denesha Ross, the rapper struggled in school and was expelled three times.

== Career ==
=== 2012–2013: Career beginnings and R.N.I.C ===
In 2012, Lil Snupe released his debut mixtape, 16 & Runnin: Tha Mixtape.

According to Lil Snupe, he signed to Meek Mill's record label Dream Chasers Records after sending out a demo to the rapper during his tour stop at the Grambling University in Louisiana. Meek Mill describes coming back from the airport and being approached by Lil Snupe during an interview with Complex magazine: "We were on our way back to the airport, a little kid knocked on the window and gave us a demo. We listened to it, we liked it and he popped up in Philly one day and was hanging with us." In March 2013, he released his single "Nobody Does It Better", a collaboration with his mentor American rapper Meek Mill. In April 2013, he released his mixtape R.N.I.C with appearances from Meek Mill, DJ Khaled, Twinn U, Jay Knoxx, Trae Tha Truth, Tay, Curren$y, and Big Poppa.

=== 2013–present: Posthumous releases ===
In December 2014, the single "Meant 2 Be" featuring Boosie Badazz was posthumously released. In January 2015, his posthumous album R.N.I.C 2 (Jonesboro), the sequel to his April 2013 mixtape, was scheduled for release in February of that year. In March 2016, Lil Snupe's team post-humously released his single "Comeback Freestyle" alongside an accompanying music video. In December 2016, a 12-track album titled 16 & Runnin Resurrected with appearances from rappers C'Nyle, Money Bagz, Jemouri, and Raidcal was posthumously released by his family.

== Death ==
=== Shooting and subsequent arrests ===
Killing of Lil Snupe
- Winnfield (Louisiana) Winnfield (the US) Location of Ross' shooting in Winnfield, Louisiana
- Location: Winnfield, Louisiana, U.S.
- Date: June 20, 2013; 13 years ago 4:00 a.m. (CDT)
- Attack type: Homicide by shooting
- Victims: Addarren Ross, a.k.a. Lil Snupe, aged 18
- Motive: Under investigation
- Accused: Alleged shooter: Tony Holden; Alleged accomplices: Edrick O. Stewart
- Charges: Holden: First-degree murder; Armed robbery; Illegal possession of a firearm by a convicted felon Stewart: Manslaughter

Ross was killed on June 20, 2013 after being shot twice in the chest. He was 18 years old. Officers responded to calls of a shooting at around 4:00 a.m at the Maplewood Apartments in Winnfield, Louisiana, on 1901 South Jones Street, and Ross was pronounced dead at the scene after paramedics were unable to revive him. The Associated Press reported that an argument broke out during a video game and culminated in the shooting death of Ross. On June 26, 2013, 36-year-old Tony Holden, the alleged killer, turned himself in to authorities and was booked into the Winnfield city jail on charges of first-degree murder, armed robbery, and illegal possession of a firearm by a convicted felon. A second suspect, 21-year-old Edrick O. Stewart, was arrested on July 3, 2013 and charged with manslaughter. In a November 2022 interview on the podcast Boss Talk 101, Ross' mother Denesha Chester revealed that the shooting was allegedly the result of a gambling argument involving the video game NBA 2K.

=== Funeral and tributes ===
On June 21, 2013, Meek Mill posted a series of tweets on his Twitter account expressing his grief over Ross' death. Later that month, he revealed that Rick Ross had wanted Snupe on the MMG compilation album Self Made Vol. 3, and shared text messages in which he inquired the rapper about a feature. Snupe's vocals were included on the album, on the track "Lil Snupe Intro". During an interview with XXL on June 20, 2013, rapper Turk said that he was about to release a collaboration with Snupe before his death.

Ross' funeral was held on June 29 at Jonesboro-Hodge High School. According to the HuffPost, hundreds of people were reportedly in attendance. In July 2017, Meek Mill released the music video for his single "We Ball" that featured Young Thug as a tribute to Ross that featured a segment of Ross' freestyle rapping and imagery surrounding the themes of funerals and cemeteries. In April 2021, Ross' father Charlie Brown, recently released from prison, documented his first visit to his son's grave and mentioned being disappointed that his son did not have a monument dedicated to him or a headstone, blaming Meek Mill and Jay-Z for its condition. In October 2021, Meek Mill released the song "Angels (RIP Lil Snupe)".

== Legacy ==
In January 2019, rapper Asian Doll named Lil Snupe as one of her lyrical influences for an interview for hip hop magazine XXL. In July 2020, rapper GlitchMan named Lil Snupe as one of his influences. In September 2021, a documentary titled The Dream Chaser which featured the life and career of Lil Snupe was screened at DocuFest 2021 in Dallas, Texas. In March 2022, during an interview with hip hop magazine AllHipHop, rapper NLE Choppa named Lil Snupe when asked about his favorite rappers.

== Discography ==
=== Studio albums ===
- R.N.I.C. 2 (Jonesboro) (2019)

=== Mixtapes ===
- 16 & Runnin: Tha Mixtape (2012)
- R.N.I.C. (2013)
- R.N.I.C. Re-Visited (2014)

== See also ==
- List of murdered hip hop musicians
