= Sean Momberger =

American record producer (born 1990)

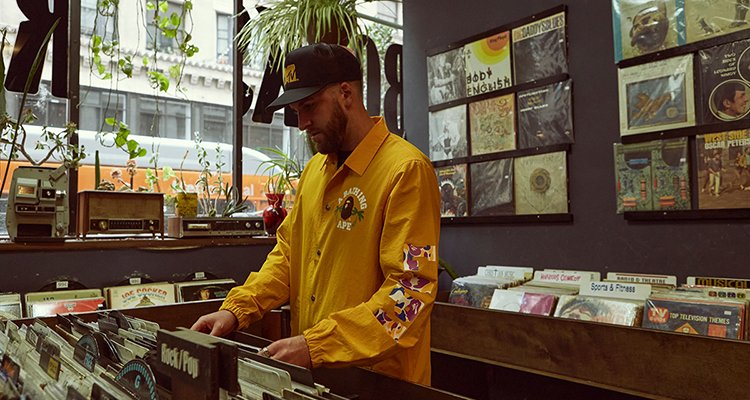
- Momberger in 2023

Background information
- Born: September 9, 1990 (age 35); Gainesville, Florida, U.S.
- Genres: Pop rap; hip hop; R&B; trap
- Occupations: Record producer
- Years active: 2014–present
- Labels: Warner Chappell; 300

Sean Momberger (born September 9, 1990) is an American record producer. He is perhaps best known for having been credited on Jack Harlow's 2023 single, "Lovin on Me", which peaked the Billboard Hot 100 for six weeks. Furthermore, Momberger co-produced Kendrick Lamar's 2024 single "Not Like Us".

Momberger's other credits include Chris Brown's "Tempo" and "Hit My Line", as well as YK Osiris's "Worth It", which received triple platinum certification by the Recording Industry Association of America (RIAA). Additionally, Momberger contributed keyboards to Iggy Azalea's 2013 single "Fancy." Momberger has also produced songs for Doja Cat, Nicki Minaj, Lil Baby, Justin Bieber, Baby Keem, Wale, A Boogie Wit da Hoodie, Kodak Black, Gunna, and Bryson Tiller, among others.

== Early life ==
Sean Momberger was born and raised in Gainesville, Florida, and received his introduction to music through piano and drum lessons. In 2013, Sean began producing music with close friend Lee Major after connecting on Twitter; over the years since they met, they have collaborated on music for Wale and Bryson Tiller. At the age of 23, Momberger moved to Los Angeles, California, to pursue a career in music.

== Production credits ==
=== 2013 ===
- Skeme - "Different", "Ain't Perfect", "Like We Live", and "Focus" from Ingleworld

=== 2014 ===
- Skeme - "Paint a Picture" from Various Artists Boondocks Mixtape Season 4 (2014)

=== 2015 ===
- Trey Songz - "Boss" from Intermission (2015)
- Trey Songz - "Pain Killers" from To Whom It May Concern (2015)

=== 2016 ===
- Skeme - "Last Time", "Watch Me", "No Pretend", "That's Wath", and "Reality Check" from Before 4eva (2016)
- Skeme - "Church in the Streets" and "Stay Dangerous" from Paranoia (2016)

=== 2017 ===
- Trey Songz - "Sho Nuff" from Anticipation III (2017)
- Jacquees and Nash B - "Handle my Bizness" from Since You Been Playin (2017)

=== 2019 ===
- Goldlink - "Cokewhite" from Diaspora (2019)
- Pardison Fontaine - "Pay Ya Bills" from Under8ed (2019)

=== 2020 ===
- K Michelle - "Love on Me" from All Monsters Are Human (2020)
- Jeezy – "Here We Go" from The Recession 2 (2020)

=== 2021 ===
- Teyana Taylor – "Try Again" from The Album (2021)
- Justin Bieber – "All She Wrote" from Freedom (EP) (2021)
- Young Stoner Life – "Paid the Fine" from Slime Language 2 (2021)
- DDG x OG Parker feat 42 Dugg – "Money Long" from Money Long (2021)
- Conway the Machine – "Clarity" from La Maquina (2021)

=== 2022 ===
- Gunna – "Too Easy" and "Too Easy (remix)" from DS4Ever
- Freddie Gibbs – "Momma's Stove" and "Gold Rings" from Soul Sold Separately

=== 2023 ===
- Jack Harlow – "Lovin on Me"

=== 2024 ===
- Kendrick Lamar – "Not Like Us"

=== 2026 ===
- Future – "Kick"
- Future – "Hollywood"

== Awards and nominations ==
Award	Year	Category	Nominee(s)	Result	Ref.
Grammy Awards	2025	Record of the Year	"Not Like Us"	Won	
Grammy Awards	2025	Song of the Year	"Not Like Us"	Won	
Grammy Awards	2025	Best Rap Song	"Not Like Us"	Won	
