= Jonah (Kanye West song) =

Song by Kanye West featuring Lil Durk and Vory

from the album Donda
- Released: August 29, 2021
- Recorded: 2020–2021
- Genre: Conscious hip-hop; R&B; gospel
- Length: 3:15
- Label: GOOD; Def Jam
- Songwriters: Durk Banks; Tahrence Brown; Albert Daniels; Michael Dean; Wesley Glass; Tavoris Hollins; Dexter Mills; Michael Suski; Kanye West; Orlando Wilder; Cydel Young
- Producers: Kanye West; DrtWrk; TT Audi; Wheezy; Mike Dean

"Jonah" is a song by American rapper Kanye West from his tenth studio album Donda (2021). The song features fellow American rappers Vory and Lil Durk (marking their first collaborations with West) along with additional background vocals from frequent collaborator Ty Dolla Sign. It peaked at number 27 on the Billboard Hot 100 chart and made the top ten on the Billboard Christian Songs and Gospel Songs charts.

== Background ==
West announced a release date of July 24, 2020 and posted a track listing for the album. "Jonah" began as a solo Vory track dedicated to Jonah Ware, a rapper from Louisville who was fatally shot and killed on August 8, 2020. Vory posted a snippet of the song on his Instagram on August 17, 2020. The song was first played at the Donda Mercedes-Benz Stadium listening party on July 23, 2021, with no vocals from West. The subsequent second listening party on August 5, 2021, at the same stadium premiered West's verse on the track.

== Summary ==
"Jonah", the seventh track off of Donda, the album that saw the reunification of Jay-Z and Kanye, begins with Lil Durk celebrating that moment, but then lamenting "I lost my brother when we was millionaires / I wasn't scared to die, but him, that was my biggest fear." Kanye West is seen as connecting his issues to God's mysterious behavior throughout the album. "Jonah" sees Kanye rapping about his relationship with God, alongside fellow rappers Vory and Lil Durk opening up about their pain of losing friends and family members, respectively. Durk's verse is dedicated to his brother, DThang, who was murdered in 2021. The Guardian said in a review of the song that Lil Durk powerfully references a nephew and a niece now without a father, and goes on to say that "West clearly inspires frank admissions from all of the featured artists on Donda, who treat him like a priest they’ve visited for a group therapy session."

The song paints a portrait of isolation, abandonment, and being in need with lyrics such as "Who's there when I need a shoulder to lean on?" and "I hope you're here when I need the demons to be gone."

== Reception ==
Donda was one of the most discussed albums of 2021, and as such there have been many reviews of "Jonah". The theme of the song, loneliness and isolation, has been noted as being particularly well portrayed, making the song easily relatable. Charlie Recchia of The Maneater called the song "an emotionally devastating track that discusses fighting inner demons and how lonely that process can be, even if you are a star" and said that "the ghostly hook on this song always gives me chills." A Gigwise reviewer called the track has "perfectly serviceable Ye cuts that follow the cookie cutter pattern of interesting features and Yeezy rapping about his relationship with God."

== Credits and personnel ==
Credits adapted from Spotify.

- Kanye West – writer, producer, performer
- Lil Durk – writer
- Michael Suski – writer
- Mike Dean – writer, producer
- Tahrence Brown – writer
- Vory – writer
- Wheezy – writer, producer
- DrtWrk – producer
- Audi – producer

== Charts ==
=== Weekly charts ===
Chart performance for "Jonah"
Chart (2021)	Peak position
Australia (ARIA)	19
Canada Hot 100 (Billboard)	28
Denmark (Tracklisten)	28
France (SNEP)	99
Global 200 (Billboard)	24
Iceland (Tónlistinn)	19
Lithuania (AGATA)	46
Portugal (AFP)	56
Slovakia Singles Digital (ČNS IFPI)	68
South Africa (TOSAC)	10
Sweden (Sverigetopplistan)	62
US Billboard Hot 100	27
US Hot Christian Songs (Billboard)	9
US Gospel Songs (Billboard)	9
US Hot R&B/Hip-Hop Songs (Billboard)	14

=== Year-end charts ===
2021 year-end chart performance for "Jonah"
Chart (2021)	Position
US Christian Songs (Billboard)	41
US Gospel Songs (Billboard)	12
