= Next (YoungBoy Never Broke Again song) =

Single by YoungBoy Never Broke Again

Single by YoungBoy Never Broke Again
- Released: February 27, 2023
- Genre: Trap; gangsta rap
- Length: 3:20
- Label: Never Broke Again; Motown
- Songwriters: Kentrell Gaulden; Daniel Lebrun; Aaron Hill; ProdByBerge
- Producers: D-Roc; Lastwordbeats; ProdByBerge

YoungBoy Never Broke Again singles chronology
"It's On" (2022)	"Next" (2023)	"Demon Party" (2023)

Music video
- "Next" on YouTube

"Next" is a song by American rapper YoungBoy Never Broke Again, released on February 27, 2023, as a single. It was produced by D-Roc, Lastwordbeats, and ProdByBerge.

== Composition ==
"Next" is a "bouncy" trap song, in which NBA YoungBoy delivers harmonies focusing on violence and murder in the streets, his wealth, and women in his life.

== Music video ==
The music video was released alongside the single. Directed by Isaac Garcia, it sees YoungBoy relaxing in his mansion while showing his money and jewelry. He is also seen with women and at a tattoo session.

== Charts ==
Chart performance for "Next"
Chart (2023)	Peak position
US Bubbling Under Hot 100 (Billboard)	24
US Hot R&B/Hip-Hop Songs (Billboard)	48
