= YK Osiris =

American rapper (born 1998)

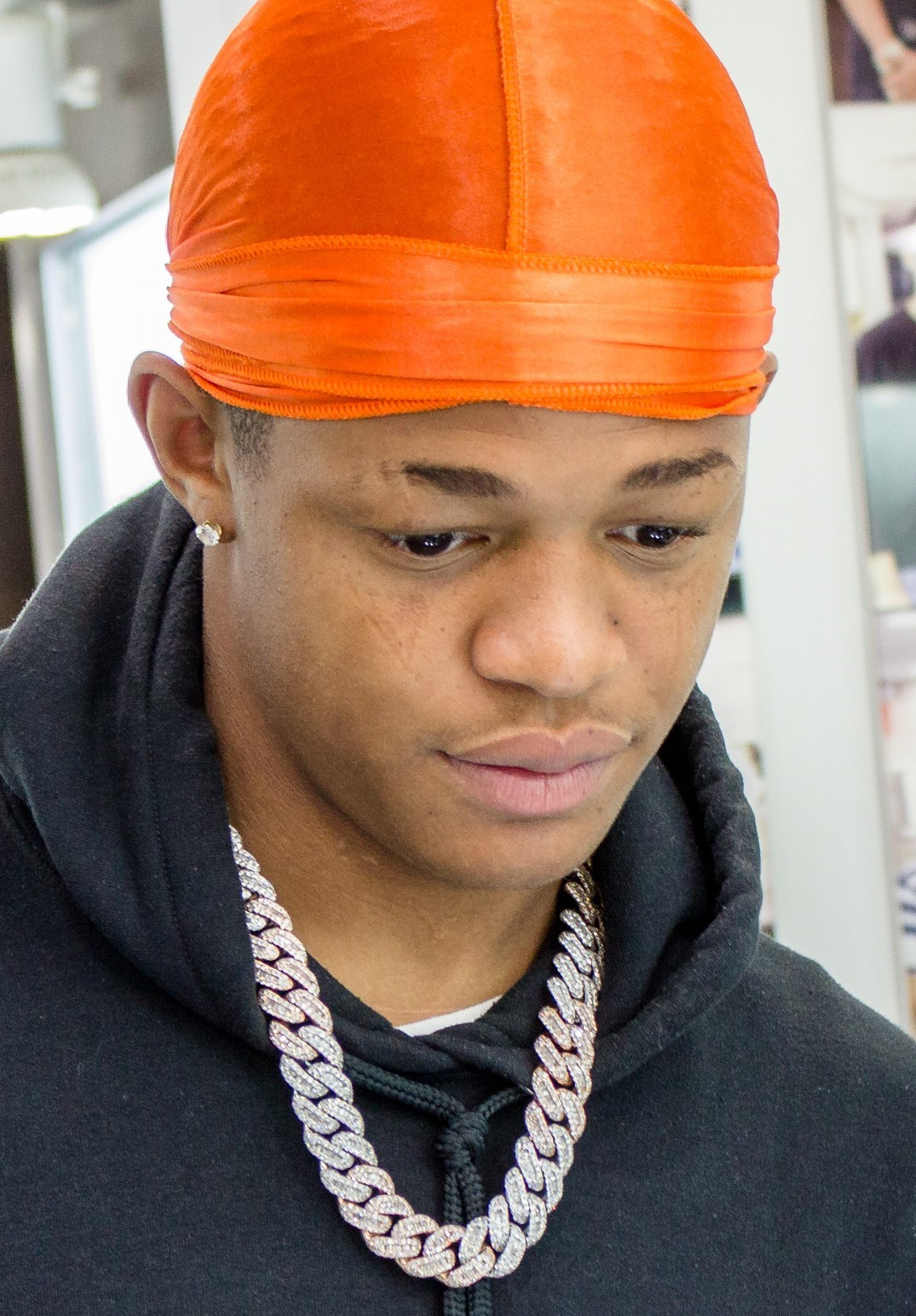
- YK Osiris in 2019

Background information
- Born: Osiris Jahkail Williams; September 7, 1998 (age 28); Jacksonville, Florida, U.S.
- Genres: R&B; hip-hop
- Occupations: Singer; rapper; songwriter
- Years active: 2017–present
- Labels: Drummer; Young King; Def Jam

Osiris Jahkail Williams (born September 7, 1998), known professionally as YK Osiris, is an American rapper and singer. He is best known for his 2019 single "Worth It," which peaked within the top 50 of the Billboard Hot 100 and received triple platinum certification by the Recording Industry Association of America (RIAA). The song preceded the release of his debut studio album, The Golden Child in October of that year, which was met with mostly indifferent critical and commercial response. The year prior, he first gained popularity from his 2018 song "Valentine," which received platinum certification by the RIAA and led him to sign with Def Jam Recordings. He was dropped from the label in 2022.

== Life and career ==
Williams was born in Jacksonville, Florida. He began creating music at a young age. Williams first uploaded songs under his birth name, posting his song "Fake Love" in 2017 before using the moniker "YK Osiris" (initialism for Young King Osiris) for future productions.

In 2018, he signed a recording contract with Def Jam Recordings, stemming from the virality of his song "Valentine". In the following year, he released a follow up single "Worth It", which became his most successful single, and remains as his only Billboard Hot 100 entry as a lead artist to date. In October 2019, he released his debut studio album, The Golden Child, under Def Jam Recordings. Def Jam released him from the label in December 2022. The same year, he made his second entry on the Billboard Hot 100 for his performance on DaBaby's song "Gospel", peaking at number 55. In July 2023, he released a single titled "Dear Fans".

In 2024, YK Osiris signed with Drummer Records. He released a single, "Time Goes By", in February of 2024.

== Personal life ==
On August 22, 2018, Williams's tour bus was shot at as it traveled along Interstate 64 in St. Louis, Missouri. Williams was not harmed, but four others inside the bus were shot and wounded. He documented the shooting on social media, including a video filmed inside Barnes-Jewish Hospital, where he said: "My car got shot at twenty times."

In November 2019, Williams was arrested in Fulton County, Georgia for aggravated assault after allegedly choking and biting his girlfriend.

In the summer of 2023, Williams stirred online controversy after a clip leaked of him attempting to kiss rapper Sukihana, while taping a basketball game, provided by Revolt, a digital cable network founded by Sean "Diddy" Combs. After he gained backlash for what users assumed was attempted sexual assault, he apologized to his fans and Sukihana, who later forgave the artist.

== Discography ==
=== Studio albums ===
Title	Album details	Peak chart positions			Certifications
Title	Album details	US	US R&B /HH	US R&B	Certifications
The Golden Child	Released: October 11, 2019; Label: Def Jam, Universal Music; Formats: Digital download, streaming	90	45	8	RIAA: Gold
Dear Fans	Released: August 13, 2024; Label: Drummer Records; Formats: Digital download, streaming	—	—	—	

=== Singles ===
Title	Year	Peak chart positions							Certifications	Album
Title	Year	US	US R&B/HH	US Rap	US Main. R&B/HH	US Chr.	CAN	NZ Hot	Certifications	Album
"Valentine"	2018	—	—	—	36	—	—	—	RIAA: Platinum	The Golden Child
"Timing"	2018	—	—	—	—	—	—	—		Non-album singles
"4 & a Baby" (with Lennox Cartel)	2018	—	—	—	—	—	—	—		Non-album singles
"Run It Up"	2018	—	—	—	—	—	—	—		Non-album singles
"Ride 4 Me" (with Big40)	2018	—	—	—	—	—	—	—		Non-album singles
"Worth It"	2019	48	18	15	7	—	87	—	RIAA: 3× Platinum; BPI: Silver	The Golden Child
"Freaky Dancer" (featuring DaBaby)	2019	—	—	—	—	—	—	—		Non-album single
"Shakira"	2019	—	—	—	—	—	—	—		The Golden Child
"Ride" (featuring Kehlani)	2019	—	—	—	33	—	—	30		The Golden Child
"Set Me Free" (with Lecrae)	2020	—	—	—	—	15	—	—		Restoration
"Leave Me On Read"	2020	—	—	—	—	—	—	—		Non-album singles
"Money Keep Coming"	2020	—	—	—	—	—	—	—		Non-album singles
"This Christmas"	2021	—	—	—	—	—	—	—		Non-album singles
"Be My Girl"	2022	—	—	—	—	—	—	—		Non-album singles
"Dear Fans" (solo or remix with Lloyd)	2023	—	—	—	—	—	—	—		Dear Fans
"Time Goes By"	2024	—	—	—	—	—	—	—		Dear Fans
"They Don't Love You"	2024	—	—	—	—	—	—	—		Dear Fans

=== Other charted songs ===
Title	Year	Peak chart positions			Certifications	Album
Title	Year	US	US R&B/HH	CAN	Certifications	Album
"Gospel" (DaBaby featuring Gucci Mane, Chance the Rapper and YK Osiris)	2019	55	32	82	RIAA: Gold	Kirk
