= Jah Vinci =

Jamaican musical recording artist

- Origin: Jamaica
- Genres: Reggae, Gospel
- Occupation: Singer
- Years active: 2005-Present
- Label: Out Clear Movement

Kirk Rhoden is a Jamaican musical recording artist better known by his stage name Jah Vinci. He has been active since 2005, but had his first breakthrough hit in 2008 with his then mentor Vybz Kartel. He was a part of Vybz group Portmore Empire until the group disbanded in 2012. He has released several of Jamaica's biggest hits starting with the Vybz collaboration "Weh Dem A Guh" on producer Stephen Mcgregor's record which became one of the most popular songs in the Dance Hall scene at that time.

== Career ==
Vinci struggled for several years to successfully launch his musical career but after the death of his brother in a tragic car accident in 2005 he began taking everything much more seriously. After this tragedy, he met Adidja Palmer, also known as the Vybz Kartel (a prominent artist in his country) who gave him the financial support to launch his career. He has collaborated with several artists and top producers internationally. He separated himself from the Gaza empire (headed By Vybz Kartel) and went on to start his own brand titled "Out Clear Movement" in which he aimed to produce inspiring and uplifting music. Vinci has also been nominated for multiple awards within the Reggae and Dancehall genres.

In 2018, he released a new collaboration with former Gaza member Popcaan the "Unruly boss" titled "Steamy". In February, 2020, he worked with another Unruly camp member, Jafrass on a single titled "Wicked".
