= Dream Chasers Records =

Record label founded by Meek Mill

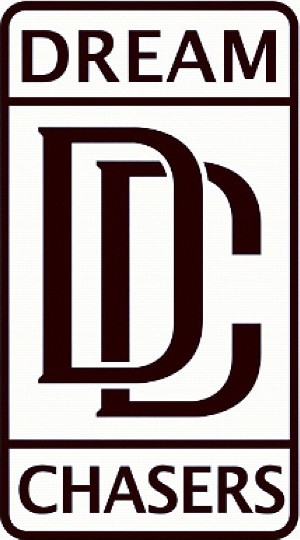
- Parent company: Maybach Music Group
- Founded: 2012
- Founder: Meek Mill
- Status: Active
- Genre: Hip hop
- Country of origin: United States
- Location: Philadelphia, Pennsylvania, U.S.

Dream Chasers Records is an American record label founded by American rapper Meek Mill. The label is a former joint venture with Roc Nation. The name was taken from his well-received mixtape series Dreamchasers.

== History ==
On October 26, 2012, Meek Mill announced the launch of his own record label imprint, Dream Chasers Records, with the flagship artists Louie V. Gutta, Lee Mazin and Goldie. In April 2013, he also signed 17-year-old Louisiana rapper Lil Snupe moments after hearing his demo. The label has since released mixtapes by Louie V. Gutta and Lil Snupe.

On June 20, 2013, exactly one week after his eighteenth birthday, Lil Snupe was murdered at an apartment building in Winnfield, Louisiana, by two gunshots to the chest. A warrant was issued for 36-year-old Tony Holden in connection with the shooting. Holden was on the run from police for four days before turning himself in to authorities.

In late 2014, Mill signed his cousin and rapper Omelly to the imprint. On May 29, 2016, Mill signed producer Nikolas Papamitrou (Nick Papz) to the label. Producer Dougie on the Beat was signed to the label in 2018. On March 20, 2019, Mill signed Chicago rapper Calboy to the imprint.

On July 24, 2019, Meek Mill announced the official launch of Dream Chasers Records as a joint venture with Roc Nation.

On July 11, 2022 Meek Mill and Roc Nation dissolved their partnership, thus ending the distribution deal.

== Notable artists ==
- Yung Bleu

Former artists

- Lil Snupe (deceased)
- Calboy
- Vory
- Lee Mazin
