= Lil Durk discography =

- Banks in 2020
- Studio albums: 9
- Collaborative albums: 1
- Compilation albums: 6
- Live albums: 1
- Mixtapes: 12
- Singles: 187
- Promotional singles: 7

American rapper Lil Durk has released nine studio albums, one collaborative album, six compilation albums, one live album, 12 mixtapes (including two collaborative mixtapes), 187 singles (including 96 as a featured artist), and seven promotional singles.

On June 2, 2015, Durk released his debut studio album, Remember My Name, which served as his first release for Def Jam Recordings. Remember My Name became his first project to chart on the Billboard 200, debuting and peaking at the 14th position. On July 22, 2016, Durk released his second studio album, Lil Durk 2X. The album peaked at number 29 on the Billboard 200. On March 30, 2018, Durk released his eighth commercial mixtape, Just Cause Y'all Waited. The mixtape peaked at number 57 on the Billboard 200. On November 9, 2018, Durk released his third studio album, Signed to the Streets 3, the last installment of his Signed to the Streets trilogy. The album peaked at number 17 on the Billboard 200.

On August 2, 2019, Durk released his fourth studio album, Love Songs 4 the Streets 2, a sequel to Love Songs 4 the Streets. The album debuted and peaked at number four on the Billboard 200. On May 8, 2020, Durk released his fifth studio album, Just Cause Y'all Waited 2, a sequel to Just Cause Y'all Waited. The album debuted at number five and later became his first album to reach the top-2, reaching number two on the Billboard 200. On December 24, 2020, Durk released his sixth studio album, The Voice. The album also peaked at number two on the Billboard 200, tying with Just Cause Y'all Waited 2 for his highest charting album at the time. From the deluxe edition of the album, it produced the top-40 song, "Finesse Out the Gang Way", which features Lil Baby and reached number 39 on the Billboard Hot 100. On June 4, 2021, Durk released a collaborative album with Lil Baby, The Voice of the Heroes, which is named after Durk's nickname of "the Voice" and Baby's nickname of "the Hero". The album debuted and peaked atop the Billboard 200, giving Durk his first No.1 album on that chart. The album produced the Billboard Hot 100 top-40 songs: the Title Track (No. 21 peak), "Hats Off" (No. 16 peak), which is a collaboration with Travis Scott, "2040" (No. 31 peak), and "How It Feels" (No. 34 peak). All four songs debuted at their peak position.

On March 11, 2022, Durk released his seventh studio album, 7220. The album debuted and peaked atop the Billboard 200, giving Durk his second chart-topping project and first solo chart-topping project. It produced two top-20 singles, "Broadway Girls" from 2021 and "Ahhh Ha", which reached numbers 14 and 18 on the Billboard Hot 100, respectively; the former single features Morgan Wallen and gave Durk his highest-charting single as a lead artist at the time. It also produced two top-40 singles, "Golden Child" and "Pissed Me Off" from 2021, which debuted and peaked at numbers 34 and 39 on the Hot 100, respectively. Two more songs from the album also reached the top 40, "What Happened to Virgil" and "Petty Too", which feature Gunna and Future, respectively; the songs reached numbers 22 and 26 on the Hot 100, respectively. That same year, Durk released a collaboration with Cardi B and Kanye West, "Hot Shit", which debuted and peaked at number 13 on the Hot 100.

On May 26, 2023, Durk released his eighth studio album: Almost Healed; despite having larger first week sales than his previous studio album, 7220; Almost Healed debuted and peaked at number 3 on the Billboard 200. However, the album produced the top-ten single, "All My Life", which features J. Cole and debuted and peaked at number two on the Billboard Hot 100, giving Durk his highest-charting song as a lead artist and overall. It also produced two more top-40 singles: "Stand by Me" (No. 22 peak), which features Morgan Wallen, and "Pelle Coat" (No. 35 peak). Almost Healed also spawned the top-50 song: “War Bout It” (No. 41 peak) which features American rapper 21 Savage.

Durk has also been featured on several songs that have received mainstream success. In 2020, he appeared on Drake's single, "Laugh Now Cry Later", which debuted and peaked at number two on the Billboard Hot 100, giving him his highest-charting song in total. That same year, Durk was featured on Pooh Shiesty's single, "Back in Blood", which reached number 13 on the Hot 100. In 2021, he joined Coi Leray on the remix of her single, "No More Parties", which hit number 26 on the Hot 100. That same year, Durk was featured alongside Lil Baby on DJ Khaled's single, "Every Chance I Get", which debuted and peaked at number 20 on the Hot 100. Durk also appeared alongside the Kid Laroi on Polo G's song, "No Return", which charted at number 26 on the Hot 100. Later in the year, Durk was once again featured alongside Lil Baby on Meek Mill's single, "Sharing Locations", which debuted and peaked at number 22 on the Hot 100. He also appeared alongside Vory on Kanye West's song, "Jonah", which reached number 27 on the Hot 100. Durk then appeared alongside Giveon on another Drake song, this time on "In the Bible", which debuted and peaked at number seven on the Hot 100. Continuing the year, he was featured alongside G Herbo and 21 Savage on another version of Nardo Wick's single, "Who Want Smoke?", titled "Who Want Smoke??" with an extra question mark in the title, which reached number 17 on the Hot 100.

== Albums ==
=== Studio albums ===
List of albums with selected chart positions
Title	Album details	Peak chart positions										Sales	Certifications
Title	Album details	US	US R&B/HH	US Rap	AUS	CAN	FRA	IRE	NZ	SWI	UK	Sales	Certifications
Remember My Name	Released: June 2, 2015; Label: Def Jam; Format: CD, digital download	14	2	2	—	—	—	—	—	—	—	US: 48,000	
Lil Durk 2X	Released: July 22, 2016; Label: Def Jam; Format: CD, digital download	29	5	4	—	89	—	—	—	—	—		
Signed to the Streets 3	Released: November 9, 2018; Label: Alamo, Interscope; Format: CD, digital download	17	8	8	—	48	—	—	—	—	—		RIAA: Gold; BPI: Silver
Love Songs 4 the Streets 2	Released: August 2, 2019; Label: Alamo, Interscope; Format: CD, digital download	4	2	2	—	25	—	—	—	—	39	US: 4,000	RIAA: Gold
Just Cause Y'all Waited 2	Released: May 8, 2020; Label: Alamo, Geffen; Format: CD, digital download, streaming	2	2	2	—	20	—	—	—	—	32		RIAA: 2× Platinum; BPI: Gold
The Voice	Released: December 24, 2020; Label: Alamo, Geffen; Format: LP, CD, digital download, streaming	2	1	1	—	6	—	—	—	—	26		RIAA: Platinum; BPI: Silver
7220	Released: March 11, 2022; Label: Alamo; Format: LP, CD, digital download, streaming	1	1	1	79	2	136	29	34	40	6	US: 6,000 (Note: In 2022 the album sold 6,000 pure copies)	RIAA: 2× Platinum; MC: Platinum
Almost Healed	Released: May 26, 2023; Label: Alamo; Format: LP, digital download, streaming	3	1	1	32	3	84	49	13	24	12	US: 3,390 (Note: In 2023 the album sold 3,390 pure copies)	RIAA: Platinum; MC: Gold; RMNZ: Gold
Deep Thoughts	Released: March 28, 2025; Label: Alamo; Format: Digital download, streaming	3	2	2	—	24	—	—	—	99	20		
"—" denotes a recording that did not chart or was not released in that territory.

=== Collaborative albums ===
List of collaborative albums
Title	Album details	Peak chart positions										Certifications
Title	Album details	US	US R&B/HH	US Rap	AUS	CAN	FRA	IRE	NZ	SWI	UK	Certifications
The Voice of the Heroes (with Lil Baby)	Released: June 4, 2021; Label:Alamo, Motown, Quality Control; Format: CD, LP, digital download, streaming	1	1	1	20	2	103	17	21	10	5	RIAA: Platinum

=== Compilation albums ===
List of albums
Title	Album details	Peak chart positions	
Title	Album details	US	US R&B/HH
Only the Family Involved Vol.1 (with Only the Family)	Released: July 31, 2018; Label: Only the Family, Empire; Format: Digital download	—	—
Only the Family Involved Vol.2 (with Only the Family)	Released: December 21, 2018; Label: Only the Family, Empire; Format: Digital download	—	—
Family over Everything (with Only the Family)	Released: December 11, 2019; Label: Alamo; Format: Digital download, streaming	93	42
Loyal Bros (with Only the Family)	Released: March 5, 2021; Label: Only the Family, Empire; Format: LP, Digital download, streaming	12	6
Loyal Bros 2 (with Only the Family)	Released: December 16, 2022; Label: Only the Family, Alamo, Empire; Format: Digital download, streaming	37	13
Nightmares in the Trenches (with Only the Family)	Released: November 17, 2023; Label: Alamo; Format: Digital download	114	40
"—" denotes a recording that did not chart or was not released in that territory.

=== Live albums ===
Title	Details
Apple Music Live: Lil Durk	Released: July 11, 2022; Label: Alamo; Formats: Digital download

== Mixtapes ==
List of mixtapes, with year released
Title	Album details	Peak chart positions	
Title	Album details	US	US R&B/HH
I'm a Hitta	Released: August 26, 2011; Label: Only the Family; Format: Digital download	—	—
I'm Still a Hitta	Released: April 3, 2012; Label: Only the Family; Format: Digital download	—	—
Life Ain't No Joke	Released: October 19, 2012; Label: Only the Family; Format: Digital download	—	—
Signed to the Streets	Released: October 10, 2013; Label: Only the Family, Coke Boys; Format: Digital download	—	—
Signed to the Streets 2	Released: July 7, 2014; Label: Only the Family, Coke Boys; Format: Digital download	—	—
300 Days, 300 Nights	Released: December 15, 2015; Label: Only the Family; Format: Digital download	—	—
They Forgot	Released: November 25, 2016; Label: Only the Family; Format: Digital download	—	—
Love Songs for the Streets	Released: February 28, 2017; Label: Only the Family; Format: Digital download	—	—
Supa Vultures (with Lil Reese)	Released: August 10, 2017; Label: Only the Family, 300; Format: Digital download	—	—
Signed to the Streets 2.5	Released: October 19, 2017; Label: Only the Family; Format: Digital download	—	—
Bloodas (with Tee Grizzley)	Released: December 7, 2017; Label: Tee Grizzley, 300, Def Jam, Only the Family; Format: Digital download	96	34
Just Cause Y'all Waited	Released: March 30, 2018; Label: Only the Family; Format: Digital download, streaming	57	28
"—" denotes a recording that did not chart or was not released in that territory.

== Singles ==
=== As lead artist ===
List of singles, with selected chart positions, showing year released and album name
Title	Year	Peak chart positions									Certifications	Album
Title	Year	US	US R&B/HH	AUS	CAN	IRE	NZ	SWE	UK	WW	Certifications	Album
"L's Anthem"	2012	—	—	—	—	—	—	—	—	—		I'm Still a Hitta
"Dis Ain't What U Want"	2013	—	— (Note: "Dis Ain't What U Want" did not enter the Hot R&B/Hip-Hop Songs chart, but peaked at number two on the Bubbling Under R&B/Hip-Hop Singles chart.)	—	—	—	—	—	—	—		Signed to the Streets
"Money Talk" (with Korn Capone, Gudda, and Hot Rod)	2014	—	—	—	—	—	—	—	—	—		Non-album singles
"WYDTM" (featuring Dej Loaf)	2015	—	—	—	—	—	—	—	—	—		Non-album singles
"Decline" (featuring Chief Keef)	2015	—	—	—	—	—	—	—	—	—		Non-album singles
"Like Me" (featuring Jeremih)	2015	— (Note: "Like Me" did not enter the Billboard Hot 100, but peaked at number nine on the Bubbling Under Hot 100 chart.)	43	—	—	—	—	—	—	—	RIAA: Gold	Remember My Name
"What Your Life Like"	2015	—	—	—	—	—	—	—	—	—		Remember My Name
"My Beyoncé" (featuring Dej Loaf)	2015	— (Note: "My Beyoncé" did not enter the Billboard Hot 100, but peaked at number two on the Bubbling Under Hot 100 chart.)	32	—	—	—	—	—	—	—	RIAA: Platinum	300 Days, 300 Nights, and Lil Durk 2X
"She Just Wanna" (featuring Ty Dolla Sign)	2016	—	—	—	—	—	—	—	—	—		Lil Durk 2X
"Money Walk" (featuring Yo Gotti)	2016	—	—	—	—	—	—	—	—	—		Lil Durk 2X
"Eyes" (featuring Talib Kweli and James Fauntleroy)	2016	—	—	—	—	—	—	—	—	—		Non-album singles
"True"	2016	—	—	—	—	—	—	—	—	—		Non-album singles
"Baller"	2016	—	—	—	—	—	—	—	—	—		Non-album singles
"Trap House (Remix)" (featuring Young Thug and Young Dolph)	2017	—	—	—	—	—	—	—	—	—		Non-album singles
"Shoot Sum"	2017	—	—	—	—	—	—	—	—	—		Non-album singles
"Real"	2017	—	—	—	—	—	—	—	—	—		Non-album singles
"Internet" (featuring Young Thug)	2017	—	—	—	—	—	—	—	—	—		Non-album singles
"Better"	2017	—	—	—	—	—	—	—	—	—		Love Songs for the Streets
"Mood I'm In" (featuring YFN Lucci)	2017	—	—	—	—	—	—	—	—	—		Love Songs for the Streets
"Pressure"	2017	—	—	—	—	—	—	—	—	—		Non-album singles
"Gang Gang" (with YFN Lucci)	2017	—	—	—	—	—	—	—	—	—		Non-album singles
"Homie Bitch" (featuring Quavo and Lil Yachty)	2017	—	—	—	—	—	—	—	—	—		Non-album singles
"True or False" (featuring Dej Loaf)	2017	—	—	—	—	—	—	—	—	—		Non-album singles
"The One" (featuring Dej Loaf)	2017	—	—	—	—	—	—	—	—	—		Non-album singles
"Nobody Know"	2017	—	—	—	—	—	—	—	—	—		Non-album singles
"I Done Seen" (featuring Yung Tory)	2017	—	—	—	—	—	—	—	—	—		Non-album singles
"No Fear"	2017	—	—	—	—	—	—	—	—	—		Non-album singles
"Goofy" (featuring Future and Jeezy)	2017	—	—	—	—	—	—	—	—	—		Non-album singles
"Make It Out"	2017	—	—	—	—	—	—	—	—	—		Signed to the Streets 2.5
"James Bond" (with Doodie Lo)	2017	—	—	—	—	—	—	—	—	—		Non-album single
"WhatYo City Like" (with Tee Grizzley)	2017	—	—	—	—	—	—	—	—	—		Bloodas
"No Standards"	2017	—	—	—	—	—	—	—	—	—		Non-album singles
"Dead N****s"	2018	—	—	—	—	—	—	—	—	—		Non-album singles
"Durkio Krazy"	2018	—	—	—	—	—	—	—	—	—		Just Cause Y'all Waited
"Crossroads"	2018	—	—	—	—	—	—	—	—	—		Just Cause Y'all Waited
"OTW" (with Cdot Honcho featuring Blac Youngsta)	2018	—	—	—	—	—	—	—	—	—		Non-album single
"1(773) Vulture"	2018	—	—	—	—	—	—	—	—	—		Just Cause Y'all Waited
"Spin the Block" (featuring Future)	2018	—	—	—	—	—	—	—	—	—	RIAA: Gold	Signed to the Streets 3
"Follow Me" (with Fxxxxy)	2018	—	—	—	—	—	—	—	—	—		Do You Trust Me?
"Downfall" (featuring Young Dolph and Lil Baby)	2018	—	—	—	—	—	—	—	—	—	RIAA: Gold	Signed to the Streets 3
"Rockstar" (featuring Lil Skies)	2018	—	—	—	—	—	—	—	—	—		Signed to the Streets 3
"No Label"	2019	—	—	—	—	—	—	—	—	—	RIAA: Gold	Non-album single
"Home Body" (featuring Gunna and TK Kravitz or remix featuring Teyana Taylor and Melii)	2019	—	—	—	—	—	—	—	—	—	RIAA: Platinum	Just Cause Y'all Waited and Signed to the Streets 3
"Turn Myself In"	2019	—	—	—	—	—	—	—	—	—	RIAA: Gold	Just Cause Y'all Waited 2
"Like That" (featuring King Von)	2019	—	—	—	—	—	—	—	—	—		Love Songs 4 the Streets 2
"Bougie" (featuring Meek Mill)	2019	—	—	—	—	—	—	—	—	—		Love Songs 4 the Streets 2
"Green Light"	2019	— (Note: "Green Light" did not enter the Billboard Hot 100, but peaked at number 15 on the Bubbling Under Hot 100 chart.)	— (Note: "Green Light" did not enter the Hot R&B/Hip-Hop Songs chart, but peaked at number four on the Bubbling Under R&B/Hip-Hop Singles chart.)	—	—	—	—	—	—		RIAA: Gold	Love Songs 4 the Streets 2
"In My Flesh" (with Markie)	2019	—	—	—	—	—	—	—	—	—		Non-album single
"Blika Blika" (with Only the Family)	2019	—	—	—	—	—	—	—	—	—		Family over Everything
"Riot" (with Only the Family and Booka600 featuring G Herbo)	2019	—	—	—	—	—	—	—	—	—		Family over Everything
"Chiraq Demons" (featuring G Herbo)	2020	—	—	—	—	—	—	—	—	—		Just Cause Y'all Waited 2
"All Love"	2020	— (Note: "All Love" did not enter the Billboard Hot 100, but peaked at number three on the Bubbling Under Hot 100 chart.)	49	—	—	—	—	—	—	—	RIAA: Platinum	Just Cause Y'all Waited 2
"Mind of a Real (Remix)" (with T9ine)	2020	—	—	—	—	—	—	—	—	—		Non-album single
"Viral Moment"	2020	91	42	—	—	—	—	—	—	—	RIAA: Platinum	Just Cause Y'all Waited 2
"3 Headed Goat" (featuring Lil Baby and Polo G)	2020	43	15	—	77	—	― (Note: "3 Headed Goat" did not enter the NZ Top 40 Singles Chart, but peaked at number 38 on the NZ Hot Singles Chart.)	—	—	—	RIAA: 4× Platinum; BPI: Silver; RMNZ: Gold	Just Cause Y'all Waited 2
"Gucci Gucci" (featuring Gunna)	2020	—	—	—	—	—	—	—	—	—		Just Cause Y'all Waited 2
"The Voice"	2020	62	22	—	—	—	—	—	—	99	RIAA: Platinum	The Voice
"Stay Down" (with 6lack and Young Thug)	2020	73	26	—	94	—	― (Note: "Stay Down" did not enter the NZ Top 40 Singles Chart, but peaked at number 28 on the NZ Hot Singles Chart.)	—	—	154	RIAA: Gold	The Voice
"Backdoor"	2020	62	18	—	—	—	—	—	—	148	RIAA: Platinum	The Voice
"Still Trappin'" (with King Von)	2021	53	15	—	77	—	― (Note: "Still Trappin'" did not enter the NZ Top 40 Singles Chart, but peaked at number 12 on the NZ Hot Singles Chart.)	—	—	93	RIAA: 2× Platinum	The Voice
"Love You Too" (featuring Kehlani)	2021	—	—	—	—	—	—	—	—	—		Non-album single
"Finesse Out the Gang Way" (featuring Lil Baby)	2021	39	15	—	65	—	― (Note: "Finesse Out the Gang Way" did not enter the NZ Top 40 Singles Chart, but peaked at number 22 on the NZ Hot Singles Chart.)	—	—	56	RIAA: Platinum	The Voice (Deluxe)
"Jump" (with King Von and Booka600 featuring Memo600)	2021	— (Note: "Jump" did not enter the Billboard Hot 100, but peaked at number 19 on the Bubbling Under Hot 100 chart.)	—	—	—	—	—	—	—	—		Loyal Bros
"Should've Ducked" (featuring Pooh Shiesty)	2021	53	19	—	—	—	—	—	—	101	RIAA: Platinum	The Voice (Deluxe)
"Voice of the Heroes" (with Lil Baby)	2021	21	7	—	43	98	― (Note: "Voice of the Heroes" did not enter the NZ Top 40 Singles Chart, but peaked at number 26 on the NZ Hot Singles Chart.)	—	62	35	RIAA: Gold	The Voice of the Heroes
"Fast Lane" (with Don Toliver and Latto)	2021	—	—	—	—	—	—	—	—	—		F9: The Fast Saga (Original Motion Picture Soundtrack)
"Nueva Vida" (with Farina and Play-N-Skillz)	2021	—	—	—	—	—	—	—	—	—		Non-album single
"Pissed Me Off"	2021	39	10	—	63	—	—	—	—	67	RIAA: Platinum; MC: Gold	7220
"Lion Eyes"	2021	— (Note: "Lion Eyes" did not enter the Billboard Hot 100, but peaked at number three on the Bubbling Under Hot 100 chart.)	34	—	—	—	—	—	—	—		Non-album single
"Broadway Girls" (featuring Morgan Wallen)	2021	14	1	—	27	—	― (Note: "Broadway Girls" did not enter the NZ Top 40 Singles Chart, but peaked at number eight on the NZ Hot Singles Chart.)	—	—	32	RIAA: 5× Platinum; BPI: Silver; RMNZ: Gold; MC: 5× Platinum	7220
"Ikea Rug" (with Chris Brickley)	2022	—	—	—	—	—	—	—	—	—		Non-album single
"Ahhh Ha"	2022	18	4	—	45	—	― (Note: "Ahhh Ha" did not enter the NZ Top 40 Singles Chart, but peaked at number 26 on the NZ Hot Singles Chart.)	—	99	33	RIAA: 2× Platinum; MC: Platinum	7220
"Golden Child"	2022	34	12	—	90	—	—	—	—	72	RIAA: Gold	7220
"Computer Murderers"	2022	61	16	—	—	—	—	—	—	—		7220
"Keep Dissing 2" (with Real Boston Richey)	2022	—	—	—	—	—	—	—	—	—		Public Housing
"Did Shit to Me" (featuring Doodie Lo)	2022	95	30	—	—	—	—	—	—	—		7220 (Deluxe)
"Hot Shit" (with Cardi B and Kanye West)	2022	13	7	39	28	60	― (Note: "Hot Shit" did not enter the NZ Top 40 Singles Chart, but peaked at number two on the NZ Hot Singles Chart.)	— (Note: "Hot Shit" did not enter the Swedish Singellista Chart, but peaked at number five on the Swedish Heatseeker Chart.)	59	29		Non-album single
"Hanging with Wolves"	2022	— (Note: "Hanging with Wolves" did not enter the Billboard Hot 100, but peaked at number three on the Bubbling Under Hot 100 chart.)	45	—	—	—	—	—	—	—		Loyal Bros 2
"All My Life" (featuring J. Cole)	2023	2	1	23	8	22	10	73	14	7	RIAA: 4× Platinum; ARIA: Platinum; BPI: Gold; MC: 3× Platinum; RMNZ: Platinum	Almost Healed
"Pelle Coat"	2023	35	10	—	69	—	— (Note: "Pelle Coat" did not enter the NZ Top 40 Singles Chart, but peaked at number 16 on the NZ Hot Singles Chart.)	—	75	79	RIAA: Gold	Almost Healed
"Stand by Me" (featuring Morgan Wallen)	2023	22	8	76	27	—	— (Note: "Stand by Me" did not enter the NZ Top 40 Singles Chart, but peaked at number five on the NZ Hot Singles Chart.)	—	—	53	RIAA: Platinum; MC: 2× Platinum	Almost Healed
"F*ck U Thought"	2023	77	26	—	—	—	—	—	—	—	RIAA: Gold	Non-album singles
"Hellcats SRTs 2" (with Sexyy Red)	2023	— (Note: "Hellcats SRTs 2" did not enter the Billboard Hot 100, but peaked at number one on the Bubbling Under Hot 100 chart.)	40	—	—	—	—	—	—	—		Non-album singles
"Guitar in My Room" (with Lyrical Lemonade and Kid Cudi)	2023	—	—	—	—	—	—	—	—	—		All Is Yellow
"Big FU" (with David Guetta and Ayra Starr)	2023	— (Note: "Big FU" did not enter the "Billboard" Hot 100, but peaked at number 23 on the U.S. Afrobeats Songs chart.)	—	—	—	—	18	—	—	—		Non-album single
"Smurk Carter" (with Only the Family)	2023	95	24	—	—	—	—	—	—	—		Nightmares in the Trenches
"Old Days"	2024	62	23	—	—	—	— (Note: "Old Days" did not enter the NZ Top 40 Singles Chart, but peaked at number 30 on the NZ Hot Singles Chart.)	—	—	—		Non-album singles
"Went Hollywood for a Year"	2024	—	46	—	—	—	—	—	—	—		Non-album singles
"We Uh Shoot" (with Polo G)	2024	—	—	—	—	—	— (Note: "We Uh Shoot" did not enter the NZ Top 40 Singles Chart, but peaked at number 27 on the NZ Hot Singles Chart.)	—	—	—		Hood Poet
"Conspiracy V2" (with YTB Fatt)	2024	—	—	—	—	—	—	—	—	—		On Zai (Deluxe)
"Turn Up a Notch"	2024	— (Note: "Turn Up a Notch" did not enter the Billboard Hot 100, but peaked at number 1 on the Bubbling Under Hot 100 chart.)	30	—	—	—	—	—	—	—		Deep Thoughts
"Monitoring Me"	2024	— (Note: "Monitoring Me" did not enter the Billboard Hot 100, but peaked at number 2 on the Bubbling Under Hot 100 chart.)	32	—	—	—	—	—	—	—		Deep Thoughts
"Late Checkout" (featuring Hunxho)	2024	— (Note: "Late Checkout" did not enter the Billboard Hot 100, but peaked at number 25 on the Bubbling Under Hot 100 chart.)	48	—	—	—	—	—	—	—		Deep Thoughts
"Opportunist"	2024	— (Note: "Opportunist" did not enter the Billboard Hot 100, but peaked at number 15 on the Bubbling Under Hot 100 chart.)	37	—	—	—	—	—	—	—		Deep Thoughts
"Can't Hide It" (featuring Jhené Aiko)	2025	84	24	—	—	—	— (Note: "Can't Hide It" did not enter the NZ Top 40 Singles Chart, but peaked at number 21 on the NZ Hot Singles Chart.)	—	—	—		Deep Thoughts
"Big Bag" (with French Montana)	2025	—	—	—	—	—	—	—	—	—		Non-album single
"—" denotes a recording that did not chart or was not released in that territory.

=== As featured artist ===
Title	Year	Peak chart positions						Certifications	Album
Title	Year	US	US R&B/HH	CAN	NZ	UK	WW	Certifications	Album
"Nutzo" (Sweetz P. featuring Lil Durk, M.O.E. Mighty, and Link)	2012	—	—	—	—	—	—		Non-album single
"Shopping Spree" (Matti Baybee featuring Lil Durk)	2013	—	—	—	—	—	—		Young Legends
"Ballin" (Young Chop featuring Johnny May Cash, Yb, Lil Durk, and King Rell)	2013	—	—	—	—	—	—		Non-album singles
"Ain't Me" (Blow featuring Lil Durk)	2013	—	—	—	—	—	—		Non-album singles
"Grab Them Heels" (DJ Moondawg featuring John Blu and Lil Durk)	2014	—	—	—	—	—	—		Non-album singles
"All I Know" (Edai featuring Lil Durk)	2014	—	—	—	—	—	—		Non-album singles
"No Problems" (Reek Da Villian featuring Lil Durk or other version also featuring Mykell Vaughn)	2014	—	—	—	—	—	—		Reek What You Sow
"War (Remix)" (Edai featuring Lil Durk)	2015	—	—	—	—	—	—		Non-album singles
"Want From Me" (Hypno Carlito featuring Lil Durk)	2015	—	—	—	—	—	—		Non-album singles
"On Me" (DJ Bandz featuring Lil Durk, SkippaDaFlippa, and G Herbo)	2015	—	—	—	—	—	—		Non-album singles
"Church (The Chicago Remix)" (BJ the Chicago Kid featuring Jeremih and Lil Durk)	2016	—	—	—	—	—	—		Non-album singles
"I Can't Wait (Remix)" (Zuse featuring Lil Durk)	2016	—	—	—	—	—	—		Non-album singles
"Wake Up" (Healthy Chill featuring Lil Durk)	2016	—	—	—	—	—	—		Non-album singles
"Figi Shots" (Rowdy Rebel featuring Lil Durk)	2016	—	—	—	—	—	—		Non-album singles
"Go Down" (Dpc Lil Chris featuring Lil Durk)	2016	—	—	—	—	—	—		Non-album singles
"Life Like This" (South featuring Lil Durk and Jrock)	2016	—	—	—	—	—	—		Non-album singles
"Run It Up (Remix)" (Yung Tory featuring Lil Durk)	2017	—	—	—	—	—	—		Free Dope
"Blew a Bag" (Tauzha featuring Lil Durk)	2017	—	—	—	—	—	—		Five Rings, Vol. 1
"Rain" (Fat Trel featuring Lil Durk)	2017	—	—	—	—	—	—		Non-album singles
"That Bag" (OTF Ikey featuring Lil Durk)	2017	—	—	—	—	—	—		Non-album singles
"Messenger Bag (Remix)" (Young Chop featuring Lil Durk)	2017	—	—	—	—	—	—		King Chop 2
"Move Like the Mob" (Zoey Dollaz featuring Young Thug and Lil Durk)	2017	—	—	—	—	—	—		Non-album singles
"Catch a Body" (OTF Ikey featuring Hypno Carlito and Lil Durk)	2018	—	—	—	—	—	—		Non-album singles
"Talkin' Bout" (Esparo featuring Lil Durk)	2018	—	—	—	—	—	—		Moment in Time
"Murder Scene" ($tupid Young featuring Lil Durk)	2018	—	—	—	—	—	—		One of One
"Out My System" (Young Chop featuring Lil Durk)	2018	—	—	—	—	—	—		Non-album singles
"Turbulence" (OTF Ikey featuring Lil Durk and Booka600)	2018	—	—	—	—	—	—		Non-album singles
"Cold" (Young Famous featuring Lil Durk and Booka600)	2018	—	—	—	—	—	—		Non-album singles
"Play Yo Role" (Only the Family featuring Lil Durk, Booka600, Doodie Lo, and OTF Ikey)	2018	—	—	—	—	—	—		Only the Family Involved, Vol. 1
"Saucin (Remix)" (Bay Swag featuring Lil Durk)	2018	—	—	—	—	—	—		Non-album singles
"Secrets" (Yung Fume featuring Lil Durk)	2018	—	—	—	—	—	—		Non-album singles
"Warning" (Saik featuring Lil Durk)	2018	—	—	—	—	—	—		Non-album singles
"Energy" (Neek Bucks featuring Lil Durk)	2019	—	—	—	—	—	—		Non-album singles
"Let Em Know" (Booka600 featuring Lil Durk and Lil Zay Osama)	2019	—	—	—	—	—	—		Non-album singles
"Crazy Story 2.0" (King Von featuring Lil Durk)	2019	81	32	—	—	—	178		Grandson, Vol. 1
"Savage" (Slimelife Shawty featuring Lil Durk)	2019	—	—	—	—	—	—		100 Reasons
"Trenches" (Checkz featuring Lil Durk)	2019	—	—	—	—	—	—		Non-album singles
"Homebody (Remix)" (Queshun featuring Lil Durk)	2019	—	—	—	—	—	—		Non-album singles
"Chariot" (Calboy featuring Meek Mill, Lil Durk, and Young Thug)	2019	—	— (Note: "Chariot" did not enter the Hot R&B/Hip-Hop Songs chart, but peaked at number two on the Bubbling Under R&B/Hip-Hop Singles chart.)	—	—	—	—	RIAA: Gold	Wildboy
"Blood Brothers" (Mista Maeham featuring Lil Durk)	2019	—	—	—	—	—	—		Maeday
"Real Rich" (Most Certainly featuring Lil Durk)	2019	—	—	—	—	—	—		Non-album singles
"Trencherous (Remix)" (Lil Zay Osama featuring Lil Durk)	2019	—	—	—	—	—	—		Non-album singles
"G:Code" (Le'Veon Bell featuring Lil Durk)	2019	—	—	—	—	—	—		Non-album singles
"Heart on Ice (Remix)" (Rod Wave featuring Lil Durk)	2019	—	—	—	—	—	—		Ghetto Gospel
"Aye Migo" (Cash Out featuring Lil Durk)	2019	—	—	—	—	—	—		Non-album single
"Last Name" (Future featuring Lil Durk)	2019	— (Note: "Last Name" did not enter the Billboard Hot 100, but peaked at number two on the Bubbling Under Hot 100 chart.)	— (Note: "Last Name" did not enter the Hot R&B/Hip-Hop Songs chart, but peaked at number one on the Bubbling Under R&B/Hip-Hop Singles chart.)	—	—	—	—	RIAA: Platinum	High Off Life
"Real Nigga Party" (Trav featuring Lil Durk)	2020	—	—	—	—	—	—		Nothing Happens Overnight
"Havin My Way" (Lil Skies featuring Lil Durk)	2020	— (Note: "Havin My Way" did not enter the Billboard Hot 100, but peaked at number 18 on the Bubbling Under Hot 100 chart.)	—	—	― (Note: "Havin My Way" did not enter the NZ Top 40 Singles Chart, but peaked at number 28 on the NZ Hot Singles Chart.)	—	—	RIAA: Gold	Unbothered
"Banana Split" (Murda Beatz and YNW Melly featuring Lil Durk)	2020	—	—	—	—	—	—		Non-album singles
"Off White" (Kosa featuring Lil Durk)	2020	—	—	—	—	—	—		Non-album singles
"All These Niggas" (King Von featuring Lil Durk)	2020	77	31	—	—	—	—	RIAA: Gold	Welcome to O'Block
"Painless 2" (J.I the Prince of N.Y and Nav featuring Lil Durk)	2020	—	—	—	—	—	—		Non-album singles
"Laugh Now Cry Later" (Drake featuring Lil Durk)	2020	2	1	1	3	4	5	ARIA: 3× Platinum; BPI: Platinum; MC: 3× Platinum; RIAA: 6× Platinum; RMNZ: 2× Platinum	Non-album singles
"Eat (Remix)" (Money Mu featuring Lil Durk and June James)	2020	—	—	—	—	—	—		Non-album singles
"Same Hands" (Bia featuring Lil Durk)	2020	—	—	—	—	—	—		For Certain
"Lie to Me" (Queen Naija featuring Lil Durk)	2020	— (Note: "Lie to Me" did not enter the Billboard Hot 100, but peaked at number 17 on the Bubbling Under Hot 100 chart.)	—	—	—	—	—	RIAA: Gold	Missunderstood
"U 2 Luv (Remix)" (Ne-Yo featuring Jeremih, Queen Naija, and Lil Durk)	2020	—	—	—	—	—	—		Non-album single
"Back in Blood" (Pooh Shiesty featuring Lil Durk)	2020	13	6	43	—	—	29	RIAA: 8× Platinum; MC: Platinum; RMNZ: Platinum	Shiesty Season
"Hasta Luego" (CalVin featuring Lil Durk)	2020	—	—	—	—	—	—		Talk My Shit Starr (Deluxe)
"Pain Away" (Meek Mill featuring Lil Durk)	2020	86	28	—	—	—	169		Quarantine Pack
"Help You Out" (Yung Fume featuring Lil Durk)	2020	—	—	—	—	—	—		Non-album single
"Hot Boy Bling" (French Montana featuring Jack Harlow and Lil Durk)	2021	—	—	—	—	—	—		CB5
"Cry Over" (Westside Tut featuring Lil Durk)	2021	—	—	—	—	—	—		Non-album single
"Like a Dream" (Nechie featuring Lil Durk)	2021	—	—	—	—	—	—		Shady Baby
"Leave Some Day" (Remix) (Kevo Muney featuring Lil Durk)	2021	—	—	—	—	—	—		Lucille's Grandson
"No More Parties" (Remix) (Coi Leray featuring Lil Durk)	2021	26	15	—	—	—	70		Non-album singles
"Go Crazy" (Remix) (Chris Brown and Young Thug featuring Future, Lil Durk, and Latto)	2021	—	—	—	—	—	—		Non-album singles
"Top (Remix)" (Fredo Bang featuring Lil Durk)	2021	—	—	—	—	—	—	RIAA: Gold	In the Name of Gee
"White Lows Off Designer" (Tee Grizzley featuring Lil Durk)	2021	—	—	—	—	—	—		Built for Whatever
"Stashbox" (Tay B featuring Lil Durk)	2021	—	—	—	—	—	—		Non-album singles
"Up the Sco" (Icewear Vezzo featuring Lil Durk)	2021	—	—	—	—	—	—		Non-album singles
"No Statements" (Kuttem Reese featuring Lil Durk)	2021	—	—	—	—	—	—		Kutt Dat Boy
"Every Chance I Get" (DJ Khaled featuring Lil Baby and Lil Durk)	2021	20	10	25	― (Note: "Every Chance I Get" did not enter the NZ Top 40 Singles Chart, but peaked at number 14 on the NZ Hot Singles Chart.)	73	27	RIAA: 5× Platinum; BPI: Silver; RMNZ: Gold	Khaled Khaled
"Quarantine in Houston" (Bruh Bruh featuring Lil Durk)	2021	—	—	—	—	—	—		Non-album single
"24 Hours" (A Boogie wit da Hoodie featuring Lil Durk)	2021	92	38	75	― (Note: "24 Hours" did not enter the NZ Top 40 Singles Chart, but peaked at number 25 on the NZ Hot Singles Chart.)	—	163	RIAA: Gold; MC: Gold	B4 AVA
"Sharing Locations" (Meek Mill featuring Lil Baby and Lil Durk)	2021	22	12	36	― (Note: "Sharing Locations" did not enter the NZ Top 40 Singles Chart, but peaked at number 18 on the NZ Hot Singles Chart.)	92	42		Expensive Pain
"Relentless" (Booka600 featuring Lil Durk)	2021	—	—	—	—	—	—		Loyal
"Find a Way" (H.E.R. featuring Lil Baby and Lil Durk)	2021	―	―	—	― (Note: "Find a Way" did not enter the NZ Top 40 Singles Chart, but peaked at number 37 on the NZ Hot Singles Chart.)	—	—		Non-album singles
"Made a Way" (FaZe Kaysan featuring Future and Lil Durk)	2021	—	—	—	—	—	—		Non-album singles
"Who Want Smoke??" (Nardo Wick featuring G Herbo, Lil Durk, and 21 Savage)	2021	17	5	41	― (Note: "Who Want Smoke??" did not enter the NZ Top 40 Singles Chart, but peaked at number 15 on the NZ Hot Singles Chart.)	—	37		Who Is Nardo Wick?
"Rambo" (Joyner Lucas featuring Lil Durk)	2021	—	—	―	― (Note: "Rambo" did not enter the NZ Top 40 Singles Chart, but peaked at number 34 on the NZ Hot Singles Chart.)	―	—		Non-album singles
"Power Powder Respect" (50 Cent featuring Jeremih and Lil Durk)	2022	—	—	—	―	―	—		Non-album singles
"Rumors" (Gucci Mane featuring Lil Durk)	2022	51	11	70	—	—	100	RIAA: Gold	So Icy Gang: The ReUp
"NWA" (Lucky Daye featuring Lil Durk)	2022	—	—	—	—	—	—		Candydrip
"Lights Off" (Tay Keith featuring Gunna and Lil Durk)	2022	—	—	—	—	—	—		Non-album singles
"Can't Lose" (Lil Mexico featuring Lil Durk)	2022	—	—	—	—	—	—		Letter to the Trenches
"Save Me" (Southside featuring Lil Durk)	2022	―	―	―	―	―	—		Non-album single
"Fuck My Cousin, Pt. II" (Lil Zay Osama featuring Lil Durk)	2022	— (Note: "Fuck My Cousin, Pt. II" did not enter the Billboard Hot 100, but peaked at number 10 on the Bubbling Under Hot 100 chart.)	44	—	—	—	—	RIAA: Gold	Trench Baby 3
"Q-Pid" (2Rare featuring Lil Durk)	2022	—	—	—	―	—	—		Non-album singles
"My Friends" (Ty Dolla Sign and Mustard featuring Lil Durk)	2022	—	—	—	― (Note: "My Friends" did not enter the NZ Top 40 Singles Chart, but peaked at number 34 on the NZ Hot Singles Chart.)	—	—		Non-album singles
"Twin" (Roddy Ricch featuring Lil Durk)	2022	— (Note: "Twin" did not enter the Billboard Hot 100, but peaked at number one on the Bubbling Under Hot 100 chart.)	35	—	—	—	—		Feed Tha Streets III
"Leave the Club" (Don Toliver featuring Lil Durk and GloRilla)	2023	— (Note: "Leave the Club" did not enter the Billboard Hot 100, but peaked at number five on the Bubbling Under Hot 100 chart.)	43	—	—	—	—		Love Sick
"Shoot Who" (Memo600 featuring Lil Durk)	2023	—	—	—	―	—	—		Non-album singles
"Savage" (Doni Bankz featuring Lil Durk)	2023	—	—	—	―	—	—		Non-album singles
"Vultures" (Kanye West and Ty Dolla Sign as ¥$ featuring Bump J and Lil Durk)	2023	34	15	24	39	— (Note: "Vultures" did not enter the UK Singles Chart, but peaked at number seven on the UK Independent Singles Chart.)	27		Vultures 1
"South Side" (Sunny Laurent, 808wrld, and Zvch featuring Steelo P. and Lil Durk)	2025	—	—	—	—	—	—		Non-album singles
"96 Bulls" (Bezz Believe featuring Lil Durk and Polo G)	2025	—	—	—	—	—	—		Non-album singles
"—" denotes a recording that did not chart or was not released in that territory.

=== Promotional singles ===
List of promotional singles, showing year released and album name
Title	Year	Certifications	Album
"Tryna' Tryna'" (featuring Logic)	2015		Remember My Name
"Hated On Me" (featuring Future)	2016		Lil Durk 2X
"Shooter2x" (featuring 21 Savage)	2016		They Forgot
"Neighborhood Hero"	2018	RIAA: Gold	Signed to the Streets 3
"India, Pt. II"	2018	RIAA: Gold	Signed to the Streets 3
"Trench Bitch" (Blac Youngsta featuring Lil Durk)	2020		Fuck Everybody 3
"Therapy Session" (with Alicia Keys)	2023		Almost Healed

== Other charted and certified songs ==
List of songs, with selected chart positions, showing year charted and album name
Title	Year	Peak chart positions								Certifications	Album
Title	Year	US	US R&B/HH	AUS	CAN	IRE	NZ Hot	UK	WW	Certifications	Album
"India"	2016	—	—	—	—	—	—	—	—	RIAA: Gold	Signed to the Streets 2.5
"How I Know" (featuring Lil Baby)	2018	—	—	—	—	—	—	—	—	RIAA: Gold	Just Cause Y'all Waited
"No Auto Durk" (Only the Family featuring Lil Durk)	2018	—	—	—	—	—	—	—	—	RIAA: Platinum	Only the Family Involved, Vol. 2
"Off White Vlone" (Lil Baby and Gunna featuring Lil Durk and Nav)	2018	54	25	—	52	—	36	—	—	RIAA: Gold; MC: Gold	Drip Harder
"Skrubs" (Only the Family featuring Lil Durk)	2018	—	—	—	—	—	—	—	—	RIAA: Gold	Signed to the Streets 3
"Slide Around" (Chance the Rapper featuring Lil Durk and Nicki Minaj)	2019	— (Note: "Slide Around" did not enter the Billboard Hot 100, but peaked at number 17 on the Bubbling Under Hot 100 chart.)	— (Note: "Slide Around" did not enter the Hot R&B/Hip-Hop Songs chart, but peaked at number four on the Bubbling Under R&B/Hip-Hop Singles chart.)	—	—	—	—	—	—		The Big Day
"Die Slow" (featuring 21 Savage)	2019	—	—	—	—	—	—	—	—	RIAA: Gold	Love Songs 4 the Streets 2
"Bora Bora"	2019	—	—	—	—	—	—	—	—	RIAA: Gold	Love Songs 4 the Streets 2
"Prada You"	2019	—	—	—	—	—	—	—	—	RIAA: Gold	Love Songs 4 the Streets 2
"Weirdo Hoes"	2019	—	—	—	—	—	—	—	—	RIAA: Gold	Love Songs 4 the Streets 2
"Twin Nem" (King Von featuring Lil Durk)	2019	—	—	—	—	—	—	—	—	RIAA: Gold	Grandson, Vol.1
"Moonwalkin" (Roddy Ricch featuring Lil Durk)	2019	— (Note: "Moonwalkin" did not enter the Billboard Hot 100, but peaked at number 20 on the Bubbling Under Hot 100 chart.)	— (Note: "Moonwalkin" did not enter the Hot R&B/Hip-Hop Songs chart, but peaked at number eight on the Bubbling Under R&B/Hip-Hop Singles chart.)	—	—	—	—	—	—		Please Excuse Me for Being Antisocial
"No Auto" (Lil Uzi Vert featuring Lil Durk)	2020	76	42	—	—	—	—	—	—		Lil Uzi Vert vs. the World 2
"Street Affection"	2020	—	—	—	—	—	—	—	—	RIAA: Gold	Just Cause Y'all Waited 2
"248"	2020	—	—	—	—	—	—	—	—	RIAA: Gold	Just Cause Y'all Waited 2
"Triflin Hoes"	2020	—	—	—	—	—	—	—	—	RIAA: Gold	Just Cause Y'all Waited 2
"Internet Sensation"	2020	—	—	—	—	—	—	—	—	RIAA: Gold	Just Cause Y'all Waited 2
"Broke Up in Miami"	2020	—	—	—	—	—	—	—	—	RIAA: Gold	Just Cause Y'all Waited 2
"Fabricated"	2020	—	—	—	—	—	—	—	—	RIAA: Gold	Just Cause Y'all Waited 2
"Pass the Water"	2020	—	—	—	—	—	—	—	—	RIAA: Platinum	Just Cause Y'all Waited 2
"Watch Yo Homie"	2020	— (Note: "Watch Yo Homie" did not enter the Billboard Hot 100, but peaked at number 10 on the Bubbling Under Hot 100 chart.)	—	—	—	—	—	—	—	RIAA: Gold	Just Cause Y'all Waited 2
"When We Shoot"	2020	—	—	—	—	—	—	—	—	RIAA: Platinum	Just Cause Y'all Waited 2
"When You Down" (Lil Tecca and Polo G featuring Lil Durk)	2020	90	32	—	77	—	24	—	—		Virgo World
"Back Again" (King Von and Prince Dre featuring Lil Durk)	2020	— (Note: "Back Again" did not enter the Billboard Hot 100, but peaked at number 11 on the Bubbling Under Hot 100 chart.)	49	—	—	—	—	—	—		Welcome to O'Block
"Movie" (Megan Thee Stallion featuring Lil Durk)	2020	— (Note: "Movie" did not enter the Billboard Hot 100, but peaked at number two on the Bubbling Under Hot 100 chart.)	39	—	—	—	—	—	—		Good News
"Redman"	2020	71	24	—	—	—	—	—	—	RIAA: Gold	The Voice
"Refugee"	2020	86	31	—	—	—	—	—	—	RIAA: Gold	The Voice
"Death Ain't Easy"	2020	93	34	—	—	—	—	—	—	RIAA: Gold	The Voice
"Coming Clean"	2020	—	—	—	—	—	—	—	—	RIAA: Gold	The Voice
"Switched Up"	2021	— (Note: "Switched Up" did not enter the Billboard Hot 100, but peaked at number three on the Bubbling Under Hot 100 chart.)	39	—	—	—	—	—	—		The Voice
"Let Em Know"	2021	— (Note: "Let Em Know" did not enter the Billboard Hot 100, but peaked at number 13 on the Bubbling Under Hot 100 chart.)	50	—	—	—	—	—	—		The Voice
"When I'm Lonely"	2021	— (Note: "When I'm Lonely" did not enter the Billboard Hot 100, but peaked at number two on the Bubbling Under Hot 100 chart.)	37	—	—	—	—	—	—		The Voice
"Every Freakin' Day"	2021	— (Note: "Every Freakin' Day" did not enter the Billboard Hot 100, but peaked at number 20 on the Bubbling Under Hot 100 chart.)	—	—	—	—	—	—			The Voice
"I Don't Know"	2021	— (Note: "I Don't Know" did not enter the Billboard Hot 100, but peaked at number 24 on the Bubbling Under Hot 100 chart.)	—	—	—	—	—	—	—		The Voice
"Kanye Krazy"	2021	91	31	—	—	—	—	—	—		The Voice
"Hellcats & Trackhawks" (with Only the Family)	2021	69	29	—	—	—	—	—	—	RIAA: 2× Platinum	Loyal Bros
"Free Promo" (Moneybagg Yo featuring Polo G and Lil Durk)	2021	80	32	—	—	—	—	—	171		A Gangsta's Pain
"2040" (with Lil Baby)	2021	31	12	—	58	—	22	—	50	RIAA: Gold	The Voice of the Heroes
"Hats Off" (with Lil Baby and Travis Scott)	2021	16	5	—	27	78	6	63	23	RIAA: Platinum	The Voice of the Heroes
"Who I Want" (with Lil Baby)	2021	46	20	—	67	—	20	83	56	RIAA: Gold	The Voice of the Heroes
"Still Hood" (with Lil Baby)	2021	56	23	—	—	—	—	—	82		The Voice of the Heroes
"Man of My Word" (with Lil Baby)	2021	60	25	—	—	—	—	—	93	RIAA: Gold	The Voice of the Heroes
"Still Runnin" (with Lil Baby and Meek Mill)	2021	43	18	—	70	—	—	—	60	RIAA: Gold	The Voice of the Heroes
"Medical" (with Lil Baby)	2021	67	28	—	—	—	—	—	107		The Voice of the Heroes
"How It Feels" (with Lil Baby)	2021	34	14	—	77	—	—	—	59	RIAA: Platinum	The Voice of the Heroes
"Lying" (with Lil Baby)	2021	70	30	—	—	—	—	—	117		The Voice of the Heroes
"Okay" (with Lil Baby)	2021	58	24	—	—	—	—	—	96	RIAA: Gold	The Voice of the Heroes
"That's Facts" (with Lil Baby)	2021	73	32	—	—	—	—	—	122		The Voice of the Heroes
"Please" (with Lil Baby)	2021	79	34	—	—	—	—	—	138		The Voice of the Heroes
"Up the Side" (with Lil Baby and Young Thug)	2021	80	35	—	—	—	—	—	128		The Voice of the Heroes
"If You Want To" (with Lil Baby)	2021	99	44	—	—	—	—	—	192		The Voice of the Heroes
"Rich Off Pain" (with Lil Baby and Rod Wave)	2021	68	29	—	—	—	—	—	118	RIAA: Gold	The Voice of the Heroes
"Make It Out" (with Lil Baby)	2021	— (Note: "Make It Out" did not enter the Billboard Hot 100, but peaked at number six on the Bubbling Under Hot 100 chart.)	50	—	—	—	—	—	—		The Voice of the Heroes
"Bruised Up" (with Lil Baby)	2021	— (Note: "Bruised Up" did not enter the Billboard Hot 100, but peaked at number four on the Bubbling Under Hot 100 chart.)	48	—	—	—	—	—	—		The Voice of the Heroes
"No Return" (Polo G featuring the Kid Laroi and Lil Durk)	2021	26	11	33	26	40	3	47	38	RIAA: Platinum; MC: Gold	Hall of Fame
"No Time" (KSI featuring Lil Durk)	2021	—	—	—	—	30	4	24	—		All Over the Place
"Take Kare" (YNW Melly featuring Lil Baby and Lil Durk)	2021	— (Note: "Take Kare" did not enter the Billboard Hot 100, but peaked at number 20 on the Bubbling Under Hot 100 chart.)	—	—	—	—	—	—	—		Just a Matter of Slime
"Rich MF" (Trippie Redd featuring Polo G and Lil Durk)	2021	56	17	—	57	—	14	—	67		Trip at Knight
"Already Won" (Rod Wave featuring Lil Durk)	2021	60	19	—	—	—	—	—	109		SoulFly (Deluxe)
"Jonah" (Kanye West featuring Lil Durk and Vory)	2021	27	14	19	28	—	—	—	—		Donda
"In the Bible" (Drake featuring Lil Durk and Giveon)	2021	7	6	14	18	—	—	— (Note: "In the Bible" did not enter the UK Singles Chart, as chart rules only allow three songs per artist to chart within the top one hundred at a time, but peaked at number eight on the UK Streaming Chart.)	9	ARIA: Gold; BPI: Silver; MC: Platinum	Certified Lover Boy
"Switches & Dracs" (Moneybagg Yo featuring Lil Durk and EST Gee)	2021	69	25	—	—	—	—	—	—		A Gangsta's Pain (Deluxe)
"Loyal to a Fault" (Big Sean and Hit-Boy featuring Bryson Tiller and Lil Durk)	2021	— (Note: "Loyal to a Fault" did not enter the Billboard Hot 100, but peaked at number three on the Bubbling Under Hot 100 chart.)	46	—	—	—	—	—	—		What You Expect
"Toxic" (Summer Walker featuring Lil Durk)	2021	45	16	—	—	—	—	—	58		Still Over It
"Chronicles" (Cordae featuring H.E.R. and Lil Durk)	2022	— (Note: "Chronicles" did not enter the Billboard Hot 100, but peaked at number seven on the Bubbling Under Hot 100 chart.)	47	—	—	—	14	—	—		From a Birds Eye View
"Take You Back" (Kodak Black featuring Lil Durk)	2022	— (Note: "Take You Back" did not enter the Billboard Hot 100, but peaked at number 17 on the Bubbling Under Hot 100 chart.)	—	—	—	—	—	—	—		Back for Everything
"Evil Twins" (with King Von)	2022	96	36	—	—	—	—	—	—		What It Means to Be King
"Started From"	2022	55	18	—	—	—	—	—	100		7220
"Headtaps"	2022	58	19	—	—	—	—	—	113	RIAA: Gold	7220
"Shootout @ My Crib"	2022	53	17	—	—	—	—	—	102		7220
"No Interviews"	2022	30	11	84	—	—	—	85	65	RIAA: Gold	7220
"Petty Too" (featuring Future)	2022	26	9	—	52	—	26	—	42	RIAA: Platinum; MC: Gold	7220
"Barbarian"	2022	48	16	—	—	—	—	—	94	RIAA: Gold	7220
"What Happened to Virgil" (featuring Gunna)	2022	22	6	—	65	—	36	70	35	RIAA: 2× Platinum; MC: Platinum	7220
"Grow Up/Keep It on Speaker"	2022	65	22	—	—	—	—	—	162		7220
"Smoking & Thinking"	2022	60	20	—	—	—	—	—	148	RIAA: Gold	7220
"Blocklist"	2022	69	25	—	—	—	—	—	176	RIAA: Gold	7220
"Difference Is" (featuring Summer Walker)	2022	73	27	—	—	—	—	—	183	RIAA: Gold	7220
"Federal Nightmares"	2022	85	35	—	—	—	—	—	—		7220
"Love Dior Banks"	2022	— (Note: "Love Dior Banks" did not enter the Billboard Hot 100, but peaked at number two on the Bubbling Under Hot 100 chart.)	47	—	—	—	—	—	—		7220
"Huuuh"	2022	— (Note: "Huuuh" did not enter the Billboard Hot 100, but peaked at number 23 on the Bubbling Under Hot 100 chart.)	—	—	—	—	—	—	—		7220
"Hear It Back" (featuring Moneybagg Yo)	2022	— (Note: "Hear It Back" did not enter the Billboard Hot 100, but peaked at number eight on the Bubbling Under Hot 100 chart.)	39	—	—	—	—	—	—	RIAA: Gold	7220
"Burglars & Murderers" (featuring EST Gee)	2022	91	27	—	—	—	—	—	—	RIAA: Gold	7220
"Risky"	2022	— (Note: "Risky" did not enter the Billboard Hot 100, but peaked at number 15 on the Bubbling Under Hot 100 chart.)	—	—	—	—	—	—	—		7220
"Till the Wheels Fall Off" (Chris Brown featuring Lil Durk and Capella Grey)	2022	— (Note: "Till the Wheels Fall Off" did not enter the Billboard Hot 100, but peaked at number four on the Bubbling Under Hot 100 chart.)	36	—	—	—	8	66	—		Breezy
"Keep Going" (DJ Khaled featuring Lil Durk, 21 Savage, and Roddy Ricch)	2022	57	18	—	67	—	—	—	113		God Did
"Mad Max" (with Future)	2022	— (Note: "Mad Max" did not enter the Billboard Hot 100, but peaked at number one on the Bubbling Under Hot 100 chart.)	36	—	—	—	36	—	—	RIAA: Gold	Loyal Bros 2
"Never Again"	2023	62	19	—	—	—	—	—	—		Almost Healed
"Put Em on Ice"	2023	72	24	—	—	—	—	—	—		Almost Healed
"Big Dawg" (with Chief Wuk)	2023	67	22	—	—	—	—	—	—		Almost Healed
"Never Imagined" (featuring Future)	2023	59	18	—	—	—	—	—	—		Almost Healed
"Sad Songs"	2023	74	26	—	—	—	—	—	—		Almost Healed
"Before Fajr"	2023	82	31	—	—	—	—	—	—		Almost Healed
"War Bout It" (featuring 21 Savage)	2023	41	13	59	—	9	—	89		RIAA: Gold	Almost Healed
"You Got Em"	2023	86	34	—	—	—	—	—	—		Almost Healed
"Grandson" (featuring Kodak Black)	2023	76	27	—	—	—	—	—	—		Almost Healed
"300 Urus"	2023	73	25	—	—	—	—	—	—		Almost Healed
"Same Side" (featuring Rob49)	2023	— (Note: "Same Side" did not enter the Billboard Hot 100, but peaked at number one on the Bubbling Under Hot 100 chart.)	40	—	—	—	—	—	—		Almost Healed
"B12"	2023	83	32	—	—	—	—	—	—		Almost Healed
"At This Point We Stuck"	2023	— (Note: "At This Point We Stuck" did not enter the Billboard Hot 100, but peaked at number 14 on the Bubbling Under Hot 100 chart.)	—	—	—	—	—	—	—		Almost Healed
"Cross the Globe" (featuring Juice Wrld)	2023	68	23	—	97	—	18	—	—		Almost Healed
"Dru Hill"	2023	— (Note: "Dru Hill" did not enter the Billboard Hot 100, but peaked at number 13 on the Bubbling Under Hot 100 chart.)	—	—	—	—	—	—	—		Almost Healed
"Belt2Ass"	2023	— (Note: "Belt2Ass" did not enter the Billboard Hot 100, but peaked at number 10 on the Bubbling Under Hot 100 chart.)	50	—	—	—	—	—	—		Almost Healed
"Moment of Truth"	2023	— (Note: "Moment of Truth" did not enter the Billboard Hot 100, but peaked at number 12 on the Bubbling Under Hot 100 chart.)	—	—	—	—	—	—	—		Almost Healed
"From the Hood" (with King Von)	2023	—	40	—	—	—	40	—	—		Grandson
"Dangerous" (with 21 Savage and Metro Boomin)	2024	35	15	—	31	—	—	—	50	RIAA: Gold	American Dream
"Dead" (with Kanye West and Ty Dolla Sign as part of ¥$ and Future)	2024	— (Note: "Dead" did not enter the Billboard Hot 100, but peaked at number 19 on the Bubbling Under Hot 100 chart.)	38	—	—	—	—	—	—		Vultures 2
"Truth in the Lies" (Central Cee featuring Lil Durk)	2025	—	—	—	46	—	—	13	98		Can't Rush Greatness
"Shaking When I Pray"	2025	94	27	—	—	—	—	—	—		Deep Thoughts
"Keep on Sippin'"	2025	96	28	—	—	—	—	—	—		Deep Thoughts
"They Want to Be You" (featuring Future)	2025	72	19	—	—	—	—	—	—		Deep Thoughts
"Soul Bleed"	2025	— (Note: "Soul Bleed" did not enter the Billboard Hot 100, but peaked at number 16 on the Bubbling Under Hot 100 chart.)	39	—	—	—	—	—	—		Deep Thoughts
"1000 Times" (featuring Lil Baby)	2025	83	23	—	—	—	—	—	—		Deep Thoughts
"Vanish Mode"	2025	63	16	—	98	—	—	—	—		Deep Thoughts
"Untouchable"	2025	— (Note: "Untouchable" did not enter the Billboard Hot 100, but peaked at number 12 on the Bubbling Under Hot 100 chart.)	36	—	—	—	—	—	—		Deep Thoughts
"Notebook (No Hook)"	2025	— (Note: "Notebook (No Hook)" did not enter the Billboard Hot 100, but peaked at number 19 on the Bubbling Under Hot 100 chart.)	41	—	—	—	—	—	—		Deep Thoughts
"Alhamdulilah"	2025	—	50	—	—	—	—	—	—		Deep Thoughts
"—" denotes a recording that did not chart or was not released in that territory.

== Guest appearances ==
List of other non-single guest appearances, with other performing artists, showing year released and album name
Title	Year	Other artist(s)	Album
"Beef"	2012	Lil Reese, Fredo Santana	Don't Like
"Wild Niggas"	2012	Fredo Santana	It's a Scary Site
"I Want It All"	2012	King Louie	ShowTime
"It's On"	2012	Bo Deal	Welcome to Klanville
"Katrina"	2012	Lil Mouse	Mouse Trap
"I Gotta Sack"	2012	Chief Keef	—N/a
"I Love Money"	2012	King Louie	—N/a
"We That"	2012	Frenchie, Yodie	GBE's for Greater Glory 2.5
"Both Sides"	2013	Juelz Santana, Jim Jones	God Will'n
"Been About It"	2013	Chaz Gotti, Trae tha Truth	Voice of Dunk
"S.O.S. (Smash On Sight)"	2013	Cap1, Lil Reese	It
"Change"	2013	Fredo Santana, Gino Marley, Capo, Ballout	Fredo Kruger
"Usher Raymond"	2013	Fly-Ty, Cap1, Juelz Santana	—N/a
"All We Do"	2013	Chinx Drugz	Cocaine Riot 3
"Frontline"	2013	SBOE	All We Got Is Us
"Clout"	2013	485	Duwop Gang
"Wassup"	2013	Lil Reese, Fredo Santana	Supa Savage
"Ride"	2013	RondoNumbaNine	Real Nigga 4 Life
"Only In Broward"	2013	Maro-Murk, Kidd Kidd	—N/a
"Lettin Up"	2013	Lil Bibby, Lil Herb	We Mean Biz
"Brothers"	2013	L'A Capone, RondoNumbaNine	Separate Myself and Real Nigga 4 Life 2
"On The Corner"	2014	Lil Herb, KD Young Cocky	Welcome to Fazoland
"ChiRaq" (Remix)	2014	Meek Mill, Shy Glizzy	—N/a
"10 Shots"	2014	Jordan Hollywood, Tory Lanez, Yo Gotti	—N/a
"Gone Lie"	2014	Chinx	Cocaine Riot 4
"On Fait Pas Ça"	2014	Lacrim	Corleone
"Murder Team"	2014	Young Chop	Still
"5 MO"	2015	French Montana, Travis Scott	Casino Life 2
"All Hustle No Luck"	2015	French Montana, will.i.am	Casino Life 2
"Hard Work"	2015	French Montana	Casino Life 2
"Where Yo Trap At"	2015	Fredo Santana, Lil Reese	Ain't No Money Like Trap Money
"Real Street N*gga"	2015	Skippa Da Flippa	I'm Havin
"Life Like This"	2015	J Rock, South	—N/a
"See Me"	2015	French Montana	Coke Zoo
"Moving Slow"	2015	Johnny May Cash, South	—N/a
"Somebody"	2015	Lil Reese	Supa Savage 2
"Myself"	2015	Lil Reese	Supa Savage 2
"Change Up"	2015	Lil Reese	Supa Savage 2
"Gang"	2016	Rowdy Rebel	Shmoney Keeps Calling
"Ridin"	2016	Young Thug	I'm Up
"My Boys"	2016	Young Thug, Ralo, Trouble	I'm Up
"I Will Not Run"	2016	Boosie Badazz	Bleek Mode
"Betcha Didn't Know"	2016	Riff Raff	Peach Panther
"Stay On It"	2016	Tink	Winter's Diary 4
"For Real"	2017	Trae tha Truth	Tha Truth, Pt. 3
"Get High"	2017	Young Thug, Snoop Dogg	Beautiful Thugger Girls
"Outside"	2017	Mozzy, Dave East, Lex Aura	1 Up Ahk
"Big Dawg Status"	2017	Philthy Rich, YFN Lucci, Young Dolph	Sem God
"We Riding"	2017	Dave East	Karma
"Bloodas 2 Interlude"	2018	Tee Grizzley	Activated
"Problems"	2018	Shy Glizzy, Quando Rondo	Fully Loaded
"Highly Anticipated"	2018	Dave East	Karma 2
"Both Sides"	2018	Juelz Santana, Jim Jones	God n' Will
"Head Off"	2018	Jim Jones	Wasted Talent
"Off White Vlone"	2018	Lil Baby, Gunna, Nav	Drip Harder
"Lies About You"	2018	Gunna	Drip Season 3
"4 Nem"	2018	G Herbo	Humble Beast
"Hoola Hoop"	2018	K Camp, True Story Gee	RARE Sound
"Time Piece"	2019	Nav	Bad Habits
"OK"	2019	Nav	Bad Habits (Deluxe)
"Deez Streetz"	2019	PnB Rock	TrapStar Turnt PopStar
"Durkio"	2019	Stunna 4 Vegas	BIG 4x
"On My Soul"	2019	Moneybagg Yo	43va Heartless
"Enemies"	2019	Yung Bans, Nav	Misunderstood
"Slide Around"	2019	Chance The Rapper, Nicki Minaj	The Big Day
"Twin Nem"	2019	King Von	Grandson, Vol. 1
"Break My Heart (My Fault)"	2019	Wale	Wow... That's Crazy
"Brothers (Remix)"	2019	Lil Tjay	True 2 Myself
"Dum Remix"	2019	JayDaYoungan	Misunderstood
"Moonwalkin"	2019	Roddy Ricch	Please Excuse Me for Being Antisocial
"Party In Heaven"	2020	G Herbo	PTSD
"No Auto"	2020	Lil Uzi Vert	Lil Uzi Vert vs. the World 2
"Safest"	2020	Quando Rondo	QPAC
"No Ice"	2020	Nav	Good Intentions
"Till The Morning"	2020	Lil Yachty, Young Thug	Lil Boat 3
"Real One"	2020	G Herbo	PTSD (Deluxe)
"Til the War Is Won"	2020	Nas	King's Disease
"When You Down"	2020	Lil Tecca, Polo G	Virgo World
"Double R"	2020	Ty Dolla Sign	Featuring Ty Dolla Sign
"Back Again"	2020	King Von, Prince Dre	Welcome to O'Block
"Movie"	2020	Megan Thee Stallion	Good News
"Pain Away"	2020	Meek Mill	Quarantine Pack
"Brothers"	2020	French Montana	CB5
"Yes Sir"	2020	French Montana	CB5
"On Your Mind"	2021	None	Judas and the Black Messiah: The Inspired Album
"Hellcats & Trackhawks"	2021	Only the Family	Loyal Bros
"Turkey Season"	2021	Only the Family, Chief Wuk	Loyal Bros
"Out the Roof"	2021	Only the Family, King Von, Booka600	Loyal Bros
"Dying 2 Hit'em"	2021	Only the Family, Slimelife Shawty	Loyal Bros
Shoot	2021	Trap Manny, Don Q	In Trap We Trust
"Why Would I"	2021	Yxng K.A	Reaper SZN (Deluxe)
"Free Promo"	2021	Moneybagg Yo, Polo G	A Gangsta's Pain
"Alone"	2021	42 Dugg	Free Dem Boyz
"No Return"	2021	Polo G, the Kid Laroi	Hall of Fame
"Hit Em Hard"	2021	Offset, Trippie Redd, Kevin Gates, King Von	F9: The Fast Saga (Original Motion Picture Soundtrack)
"No Time"	2021	KSI	All Over the Place
"I Like (Remix)"	2021	Kalan.FrFr	TwoFr 2 (Extended)
"In Town"	2021	EST Gee	Bigger Than Life or Death
"Don't Leave Me"	2021	The Kid Laroi, G Herbo	F*ck Love 3 (Over You)
"Take Kare"	2021	YNW Melly, Lil Baby	Just a Matter of Slime
"Rich MF"	2021	Trippie Redd, Polo G	Trip at Knight
"Already Won"	2021	Rod Wave	SoulFly (Deluxe)
"Free RIC"	2021	42 Dugg	Free Dem Boyz (Deluxe)
"Jonah"	2021	Kanye West, Vory	Donda
"Miss My Glock 26"	2021	Big30	King of Killbranch
"In the Bible"	2021	Drake, Giveon	Certified Lover Boy
"Switches & Dracs"	2021	Moneybagg Yo, EST Gee	A Gangsta's Pain (Deluxe)
"Loyal to a Fault"	2021	Big Sean, Hit-Boy, Bryson Tiller	What You Expect
"Toxic"	2021	Summer Walker	Still Over It
"Stuck in the Jungle"	2021	French Montana, Pop Smoke	They Got Amnesia
"Chronicles"	2022	Cordae, H.E.R.	From a Birds Eye View
"Lost Kings"	2022	2 Chainz, Sleepy Rose	Dope Don't Sell Itself
"Take You Back"	2022	Kodak Black	Back for Everything
"Evil Twins"	2022	King Von	What It Means to Be King
"Like a Thug"	2022	Latto	777
"Affiliated"	2022	Future	I Never Liked You
"Bop Him"	2022	Lil Kee	Letter 2 My Brother
"Till the Wheels Fall Off"	2022	Chris Brown, Capella Grey	Breezy
"Somebody Else"	2022	Calvin Harris, Jorja Smith	Funk Wav Bounces Vol. 2
"Keep Going"	2022	DJ Khaled, 21 Savage, Roddy Ricch	God Did
"Bruddanem"	2022	JID	The Forever Story
"My Dawg"	2022	Nav	Demons Protected by Angels
"Most Hate"	2022	Jeezy, DJ Drama	Snofall
"Wonderful Wayne & Jackie Boy"	2022	Babyface Ray	Mob
"Damn Homie"	2022	A Boogie wit da Hoodie	Me vs. Myself
"1ro"	2022	Anuel AA	LLNM2
"Muscles"	2023	Trippie Redd	Mansion Musik
"Spinnin'"	2023	EST Gee	Fast X (Original Motion Picture Soundtrack)
"Rock Out"	2023	Moneybagg Yo, YTB Fatt	Hard to Love
"From the Hood"	2023	King Von	Grandson
"Dangerous"	2024	21 Savage, Metro Boomin	American Dream
"Money Ain't a Thing"	2024	French Montana	Mac & Cheese 5
"Spotlight"	2024	A Boogie wit da Hoodie	Better Off Alone
"Gangstas Relate"	2024	Moneybagg Yo	Speak Now
"Ghetto"	2024	Mustard, Young Thug	Faith of a Mustard Seed
"Dead"	2024	¥$ (Kanye West, Ty Dolla Sign), Future	Vultures 2
"In the Air"	2024	G Herbo	Big Swerv 2.0
"Lyfestyle"	Yeat	Lyfestyle	
"Truth in the Lies"	2025	Central Cee	Can't Rush Greatness
