= Jae Deal =

American record producer

- Origin: Baltimore, Maryland; Los Angeles, California, United States
- Genres: Pop; hip hop; gospel; modern jazz; classical
- Occupations: Record producer; musical director; orchestrator; arranger; record executive
- Instruments: Keyboards; bass guitar; synthesizer; drums; Reason; Logic Pro; Pro Tools; Akai MPC & MPD
- Years active: 1994–present
- Website: www.jaedeal.net

Jae Deal is an American record producer and music educator. He is a Professor of Music Production, Music Technology, and Hip Hop Music & Culture at the USC Thornton School of Music. Jae Deal has worked behind the scenes and on stage with several music industry acts including Janet Jackson, Lady Gaga, Snoop Dogg, Lauryn Hill, Charli XCX, Mary Mary, Karen Clark Sheard, Ne-Yo, Faith Evans, Tye Tribbett, T-Pain, Jessica Simpson, and Wynton Marsalis. He has also contributed to the works of Elton John, Jill Scott, and songwriter Diane Warren. Other projects have included performances with the Baltimore Symphony Orchestra and musical direction for Kirk Franklin’s Youth Ministry at Faithful Central Bible Church.

== Early life ==
Jae Deal is from Baltimore, Maryland and began playing instruments at the age of seven. He attended Friends School of Baltimore, the oldest private school in Baltimore. By the time Jae was in high school, he was already a skillful bass guitar and synthesizer player. By the tenth grade, he was participating in PBS specials, international tours, and performances for the Pope with Dr. Nathan Carter of the Morgan State University Choir. Shortly after high school, Gospel music producer Steven Ford hired Jae to play on two major gospel recordings. The first was Vickie Winans, Live in Detroit. It was her first live recording and it was nominated for a Stellar Award. The second was T.D. Jakes’ Woman Thou Art Loosed. It won a Stellar Award and was Grammy nominated.

Jae Deal attended Morgan State University in Baltimore, Maryland graduating with a Bachelor of Science in Pure Mathematics. He studied classical music independently in his college years. Jae Deal's parallel education in music and mathematics have let him employ a mathematically inclined methodology towards analysis and production of music as he explains in an interview with Jammcard.

== Career ==
After moving to Los Angeles, Jae Deal began working with young pop artists such as Christina Milian, Marques Houston, and Omarion. Jae Deal also performed with his childhood friend, Mario (entertainer) on Good Morning America. Deal continued to work as a live musician, orchestrator, director and programmer and live musician for several tours, and recording sessions. Projects included Elton John, Snoop Dogg & the Snoopadelics, Mary Mary, Karen Clark Sheard and Jill Scott. Other projects have included Christmas specials, the Baltimore Symphony Orchestra, performing alongside Wynton Marsalis in Darin Atwater’s Soulful Symphony debut and a year and a half stint as arranger with legendary songwriter Diane Warren.

In 2008, Jae served as the orchestrator and Pro Tools programmer on Janet Jackson's "Rock Witchu Tour".

Deal is currently refining what he describes as a topological methodology for analyzing and composing music.

== Additional work ==
- Jae Deal produced and directed the performances of the Millennium Harmony Orchestra at the AFRAM arts festival in Baltimore, MD.
- Jae Deal, alongside Hollywood curator Monica Payne, co-created and produced #FLASHLIGHT, a progressive musical performance series based in Los Angeles. Featured musicians included producers Ethan Farmer, Keith Harris, Ish a.k.a. “Wow Jones” & musicians Kamasi Washington and Tony Royster Jr. Featured DJs included MC Lyte and DJ Smooth Dee.
- On May 9, 2019 Deal was the producer, host, and music director for "The Jammjam" event presented by Jammcard honoring George Clinton and Parliament-Funkadelic for receiving the Grammy Lifetime Achievement Award. Stars including Ice Cube, Anderson .Paak, CeeLo Green, Flea (musician), Eddie Griffin, and Dj Battlecat jammed alongside members of Parliament-Funkadelic.

In 2024, Jae's "Joint 2" was sampled by Kanye West on the song "Vultures" and by Charli XCX on her song "Everything Is Romantic".

== Community ==
Years before becoming a professor at USC Thornton School of Music, Jae participated in music tutoring programs and appeared as a motivational speaker:

- G.A.M.E. (Gilmor and Morgan Exchange) - Baltimore, MD - Jae Deal was founder and director of The GAME program, of the 503 Academy, which connected Gilmor Elementary School students with college students from Morgan State University for mentoring.
- UCLA – "Ethnomusicology M119: The Cultural History of Rap (Hip Hop)" - Los Angeles, CA - Jae Deal was a guest lecturer discussing the chronology of technological development alongside the Hip-Hop culture, considering future trends in Hip-Hop technology.
- Los Angeles College of Music 2016 - Pasadena, CA - Jae Deal wrote the Songwriting 1 curriculum for the Los Angeles College of Music, served as an instructor of Songwriting 1 and Industry Showcase and provided career counseling.
- Musicians Institute 2018 - Hollywood, CA - Jae taught Networking Strategies and Artist Development in the Music Business department of Musicians Institute.
- Women :Amplified - Santa Monica, CA - On Equal Pay Day, March 25, 2025, at The Recording Club, Deal co-launched Women :Amplified, a cultural event at The Recording Club in Santa Monica spotlighting and uplifting women in music and tech. The evening honored Alicia Keys, DIXSON, Emily Van Belleghem, Valeisha Butterfield, Gwen Bethel Riley, and Joelle James. In the Women :Amplified Podcast Room he spoke with USC Annenberg student Evyn Ableson about allyship and gender equity, stating, “Men must stand in solidarity as part of the solution.” Partners included She Is The Music, Guitar Center Music Foundation, Loop Studios, and Who Has It? .

== Awards ==
Year	Award	Category	Nominated work	Result
2023	66th Grammy Awards	Best Jazz Performance	"Vulnerable" (as songwriter)	Nominated
2023	66th Grammy Awards	Best Jazz Instrumental Album	"Legacy: The Instrumental Jawn" (included song "Vulnerable")	Nominated
2024	67th Grammy Awards	Album of the Year	*brat* by Charli XCX (Producer/Songwriter on "Everything is Romantic")	Nominated
2024	67th Grammy Awards	Best Dance/Electronic Album	*brat* by Charli XCX (Producer/Songwriter on "Everything is Romantic")	Won

- Part-Time Lecturer, University of Southern California, Thornton School of Music
- Guest Lecturer, UCLA School of Ethnomusicology
- Member, American Society of Composers, Authors and Publishers (ASCAP)
- Member and judge, Jammcard
- Jae Deal and co-composer Tia P won the 2016 International John Lennon Songwriting Contest in the category of Hip-Hop. In the same year both artists were the first international contestants to win the Australia's Vanda & Young Songwriting Competition.

== Endorsements / affiliations ==
- KORG U.S.A.
- Propellerhead's Reason
- Moog Music, Inc
- ROLI
