= Loyal Bros 2 =

Compilation album by Only the Family(2022)

Compilation album by Only the Family and Lil Durk
- Released: December 16, 2022
- Length: 57:10
- Labels: Only the Family; Empire
- Producers: Baby Plugg; Baby Pluto; BeatsByMax; Benny; BroskiBoi; Boxhead; Carter; Chopsquad DJ; Cicero; Crevm Dian; Cubeatz; Daniel Taylor; DecayOnTheBeat; DJ Bandz; DJ FMCT; Ebon; Gyard; Hendrix Smoke; HitmanAudio; HocusKrazy; Jkari; Joel Demora; John Lam; K Hendrix; King Osama; Kushgod; Lala the DJ; LayZ Beats; Luis Bacqué; Macshooter49; Marko Lenz; Meech Magic; Meralless; Migo; Nile Waves; Noza Jordan; OB Mus1c; Phil2k; Puncho; Raydo; RicoRunDat; Ringt808ne; Tayko; Teezy Too Dope; Tizzle; Twenseventeen; Vaze Beats; VSOnThaBeat

Only the Family chronology
Loyal Bros (2021)	Loyal Bros 2 (2022)	Nightmares in the Trenches (2023)

Lil Durk chronology
7220 (2022)	Loyal Bros 2 (2022)	Almost Healed (2023)

Singles from Loyal Bros 2
- 1. "ISTG, Pt. 2" Released: December 2, 2022; 2. "Hanging with Wolves" Released: December 9, 2022

Loyal Bros 2 (officially titled Only the Family – Lil Durk Presents: Loyal Bros 2) is a collaborative compilation album by American record label and hip-hop group Only the Family, and its founder, American rapper Lil Durk. It was released through the label alongside Empire Distribution on December 16, 2022. The album contains guest appearances from Future, Doodie Lo, Kodak Black, OTF Boonie Moe, THF Lil Law, THF Omerta, Booka600, late rapper King Von, Deeski, Lil Zay Osama, Chief Nuk, PGF Nuk, late rapper THF Zoo, Big30, Icewear Vezzo, OTF Jam, OTF Chugg, Noza Jordan, Esparo, C3, Trippie Redd, and Hypno Carlito. It serves as a sequel to Only the Family's compilation album, Loyal Bros (2021).

== Singles and promotion ==
The lead single of the album, "ISTG, Pt. 2", which was performed by American rapper Doodie Lo and features fellow American rapper Kodak Black, was released on December 2, 2022. The second and final single, "Hanging with Wolves", which was performed by Lil Durk himself was released exactly one week later on December 9, 2022. The same day as its release, Durk announced the album alongside its title, release date, cover art, and a pre-order link. Five days later, on December 14, 2022, he revealed the tracklist.

== Track listing ==
Loyal Bros 2 track listing
No.	Title	Writer(s)	Producer(s)	Length
1.	"Set It Off" (performed by Lil Durk)	Durk Banks; Rahshan Kyles; Devonte Richmond; Oritseniraro Bemigho-Amorighoye	Cicero; DJ Bandz; OB Mus1c	2:42
2.	"Mad Max" (performed by Lil Durk and Future)	Banks; Nayvadius Wilburn; Gregory Sanders, Jr.	HitmanAudio	2:33
3.	"Hanging with Wolves" (performed by Lil Durk)	Banks; Darrell Jackson; Nile Bey; Williams Goldberg	Chopsquad DJ; Jkari; Nile Waves; DecayOnTheBeat	3:25
4.	"ISTG, Pt. 2" (performed by Doodie Lo featuring Kodak Black)	David Saulsberry; Bill Kapri; Kutlwano Motloatsi	Kushgod; BroskiBoi	2:26
5.	"For Real" (performed by OTF Boonie Moe)	OTF Boonie Moe; Osama Ed Daou; Daniela Voznesensky; Maximilian McFarlin; Raydo	King Osama; Lala the DJ; Macshooter49; Raydo	2:00
6.	"NLMG" (performed by Doodie Lo, THF Lil Law, and THF Omertà)	Saulsberry; Lawrence Northern; THF Omertà; Rohan Mehta; Viktor Sudobin; Bulat Malikov	HocusKrazy; Vaze Beats; VSOnThaBeat; Carter; Twenseventeen	2:00
7.	"Feed Em Addy's" (performed by Booka600 and Lil Durk)	Darontez Mayo; Banks; Jackson	Chopsquad DJ	2:25
8.	"We Did It" (performed by OTF Boonie Moe featuring King Von)	OTF Boonie Moe; Dayvon Bennett; Devonte Richmond; Maliki Decampos	DJ Bandz; DJ FMCT	2:44
9.	"Seen It All" (performed by Deeski and Lil Zay Osama)	Deandre Wilson; Isaiah Dukes; Voznesensky; Ed Daou	Lala the DJ; King Osama	2:34
10.	"Ain't Hiding" (performed by Chief Wuk)	Vontrell Voker; Lesidney Ragland; Derrick Miller; Tim Gomringer; Kevin Gomringer; Teslenko Alexandrovich; Luis Bacqué	Teezy Too Dope; Hendrix Smoke; Cubeatz; Tizzle; Bacqué	1:53
11.	"Savage Shit" (performed by Doodie Lo and PGF Nuk)	Saulsberry; Virgil Gibson; Richmond; Decampos; Kevin Da Silva	DJ Bandz; DJ FMCT; RicoRunDat	2:32
12.	"Mad Cuz I'm Rich" (performed by THF Zoo and Big30)	Devonsha Collier; Rodney Wright, Jr.; Jackson	Chopsquad DJ	3:34
13.	"Block Is Hot" (performed by Lil Durk and Deeski)	Banks; Wilson; Voznesensky; Ed Daou; Philipp Lindworsky; Williams Goldberg; Joel Demora	Lala the DJ; King Osama; Phil2k; Demora	2:10
14.	"Thug Life" (performed by Doodie Lo and Chief Wuk featuring Icewear Vezzo)	Saulsberry; Voker; Chivez Smith; Andrew Sedani	BeatsByMax	2:22
15.	"Federal Freestyle" (performed by OTF Jam)	OTF Jam; Voznesensky	Lala the DJ; Ringt808ne	1:49
16.	"Out the Way" (performed by Lil Durk and OTF Chugg)	Banks; OTF Chugg	Migo; Puncho	2:15
17.	"Forever" (performed by Noza Jordan)	Noza Jordan; Benjamin Hubble; Lam; Jordan; Francis Lopez Varela; Davis Ashton	LayZ Beats; John Lam; Jordan	2:03
18.	"Please Breathe" (performed by Lil Durk, Esparo, and Booka600)	Banks; Esparo Voltaire; Mayo; Lam; Kevin Webb; Ebon Thomas	Lam; K Hendrix; Ebon	2:37
19.	"Never Saw Em" (performed by C3)	Charles Laster III; Decordia Chism; Daniele Veglia; Mark Nikolaev	Boxhead; Gyard; Marko Lenz	1:52
20.	"Threats to Everybody" (performed by Lil Durk)	Banks; Motloatsi; Daniel Taylor	Kushgod; Taylor; Tayko	2:04
21.	"Who You Are" (performed by Doodie Lo featuring Trippie Redd)	Saulsberry; Michael White IV; Richmond	DJ Bandz; Meech Magic; Meralless	2:11
22.	"Silly Rabbit" (performed by Hypno Carlito)	Robert Amparan; Serezha Borodin; Vladislav Dugin	Baby Pluto; Baby Plugg; Crevm Dian	3:08
23.	"Menace" (performed by Booka600)	Mayo; Ben Yancey	Benny	2:15
Total length:				57:10

== Charts ==
Chart performance for Loyal Bros 2
Chart (2022)	Peak position
Canadian Albums (Billboard)	79
US Billboard 200)	37
US Top R&B/Hip-Hop Albums (Billboard)	13
