= Computer Murderers =

2022 single by Lil Durk

Single by Lil Durk

from the album 7220
- Released: March 18, 2022
- Genre: Drill
- Length: 2:20
- Label: Only the Family; Alamo; Sony
- Songwriters: Durk Banks; Trenton Turner; Marko Cervantes
- Producers: Touch of Trent; TrillBans

Lil Durk singles chronology
"Ahhh Ha" (2022)	"Computer Murderers" (2022)	"Keep Dissing 2" (2022)

Music video
- "Computer Murderers" on YouTube

"Computer Murderers" is a song by American rapper Lil Durk. It was released through Only the Family, Alamo Records, and Sony Music on March 18, 2022, as the fifth single from his seventh studio album, 7220, as the only new addition to the re-release of the album on the same day. Durk wrote the song with producers Touch of Trent and TrillBans. Three days before its release, he teased it by posting a screenshot of the song recording with the then title, "Computer Murders", through an Instagram story with the caption: "Niggas pissed me off again", possibly alluding to another single from the album, "Pissed Me Off" from 2021.

== Composition and lyrics ==
On "Computer Murderers", Durk takes shots at the FBG rap group from his hometown of Chicago, Illinois. He addresses FBG Wooski being shot in the head at a funeral in 2018 and FBG Cash taking a picture in front of a mural of Durk's late Only the Family artist, fellow rapper King Von. On the first verse of the song, Durk raps: "Check on your mans, I heard he got hit in his head (Hello?) / But he almost died, so I can say his name 'cause he ain't dead (Wooski) / How you let a nigga vouch for you who just got out the feds? / Sneakin' pics by Von mural like lil' bro won't come out and spin (Grrah, grrah) / He ain't hurt a fly, so he ain't count, I still'll give him ten (Still'll give him ten)". Throughout the song, he sends more threats to his opponents, while boasting about his hedonistic lifestyle.

== Music video ==
The official music video for "Computer Murderers", directed by Jerry Productions, premiered alongside the song on March 18, 2022. It sees Durk flexing huge stacks of cash, while partying in a penthouse in New York City.

== Charts ==
Chart performance for "Computer Murderers"
Chart (2022)	Peak position
US Billboard Hot 100	61
US Hot R&B/Hip-Hop Songs (Billboard)	16
