= Golden Child (Lil Durk song) =

2022 single by Lil Durk

Single by Lil Durk

from the album 7220
- Released: March 10, 2022
- Genre: Drill
- Length: 3:17
- Label: Only the Family; Alamo; Sony
- Songwriters: Durk Banks; Tim Gomringer; Kevin Gomringer; Christian Ward; Christopher Pearson; Ivory Scott; Jorres Nelson
- Producers: Cubeatz; Hitmaka; YC; Real Red

Lil Durk singles chronology
"Ahhh Ha" (2022)	"Golden Child" (2022)	"Computer Murderers" (2022)

Music video
- "Golden Child" on YouTube

"Golden Child" is a song by American rapper Lil Durk. It was released through Only the Family, Alamo Records, and Sony Music on March 10, 2022, as the fourth and final single for his seventh studio album, 7220, one day before the album was released. Durk released the song with producers Cubeatz (duo members Tim and Kevin Gomringer), Hitmaka, YC and Real Red.

== Composition and lyrics ==
On "Golden Child", Durk takes a shot at American DJ and interviewer DJ Vlad with the lines: "I don't speak tongues, period / I don't fuck with Vlad". A few other rappers have previously had problems with Vlad as federal officers have used what they said in interviews with him to answer his questions as evidence against them. Throughout the song, he raps about his loyalty ane name-drops previous collaborator, American singer Bryson Tiller. Preezy Brown of Vibe wrote that the song "capture[s] Durk in his freewheeling element that fans have come to love him for".

== Music video ==
The official music video for "Golden Child", directed by Jerry Productions, premiered alongside the song on March 10, 2022. The video sees Durk hanging out with artists signed to his record label, Only the Family, as they flex huge stacks of cash.

== Charts ==
Chart performance for "Golden Child"
Chart (2022)	Peak position
Canada Hot 100 (Billboard)	90
Global 200 (Billboard)	72
US Billboard Hot 100	34
US Hot R&B/Hip-Hop Songs (Billboard)	12

== Certifications ==
Certifications for "Golden Child"
Region	Certification	Certified units/sales
United States (RIAA)	Gold	500,000^{‡}
^{‡} Sales+streaming figures based on certification alone.
