= Old Days (Lil Durk song) =

2024 single by Lil Durk

Single by Lil Durk
- Released: February 23, 2024
- Genre: Hip hop; political hip hop
- Length: 3:15
- Label: Alamo
- Songwriters: Durk Banks; Joshua Luellen; Smatt Sertified
- Producers: Southside; Smatt Sertified; Wasa

Lil Durk singles chronology
"Vultures" (2023)	"Old Days" (2024)	"Went Hollywood for a Year" (2024)

Music video
- "Old Days" on YouTube

"Old Days" is a single by American rapper Lil Durk, released under Alamo Records on February 23, 2024. In the song, Durk reflects on his past struggles with drug addiction, which he shared with the late rapper King Von. He also addresses his former associates who took advantage of him when he was struggling financially, targeting them with subtle disses.

== Background ==
The song was first previewed online on January 26, 2024, when Lil Durk shared a snippet on his social media pages. A few days later, on February 17, 2024, Durk announced the release date and posted another snippet from the song's music video on February 20, 2024. The song was officially released on February 23, 2024.

== Composition ==
The song features "a hi-hat and piano-led beat, accompanied by sad and soulful lyrics", which find Lil Durk reflecting on his life struggles, drug addiction, and the increasing harsh realities of the streets. Durk also pays tribute to the late rapper King Von, referencing his death with the lyrics, "The autopsy of Von's body had me coughin' up my vomit".

== Critical reception ==
Rap-Up's Malcolm Trapp hailed the song as "iconic". He also praised the music video, describing it as "an emotionally charged glimpse into the rapper's world, conveying sorrow, disappointment, and betrayal".

== Music video ==
The accompanying music video, directed by Jerry Productions, features Lil Durk alongside Boonie Moe. Within six days of its release, the video garnered over 4 million views on YouTube.

== Charts ==
Chart performance for "Old Days"
Chart (2024)	Peak position
New Zealand Hot Singles (RMNZ)	30
US Billboard Hot 100	62
US Hot R&B/Hip-Hop Songs (Billboard)	23
