= What Happened to Virgil =

2022 song by Lil Durk featuring Gunna

Song by Lil Durk featuring Gunna

from the album 7220
- Released: March 11, 2022
- Genre: Drill; hip hop
- Length: 3:01
- Label: Only the Family; Alamo; Sony
- Songwriters: Durk Banks; Sergio Kitchens; Darrel Jackson
- Producer: Chopsquad DJ

Music video
- "What Happened to Virgil" on YouTube

"What Happened to Virgil" is a song by American rapper Lil Durk featuring fellow American rapper Gunna from the former's seventh studio album 7220 (2022). Produced by Chopsquad DJ, the song is a tribute to the late fashion designer Virgil Abloh.

== Background ==
The song is a tribute to fashion designer and entrepreneur Virgil Abloh, Lil Durk's brother D Thang, and rapper King Von. Abloh died in November 2021 and was a friend of Lil Durk.

Following its release, the song was popularly used in videos on TikTok. Durk promised to release the song's music video if it reached 10,000 creations on TikTok.

== Music video ==
The official music video was directed by Cole Bennett and released on April 11, 2022. It opens with a quote from Abloh that reads: "Life is so short that you can't waste even a day subscribing to what someone thinks you can do versus knowing what you can do." The video features Lil Durk and Gunna rapping in the presence of multiple sets inspired by Abloh's work, including near Drake's Air Drake jet (which was painted by Abloh), on a red rooftop that replicates the Louis Dreamhouse from one of Abloh's final projects for Louis Vuitton, and in a warehouse filled with magically growing flowers. At the end of the video, it is explained how each of these sets are related to Abloh. And also at the end of the video, Tributes are paid to D Thang (Lil Durk's Brother), who was murdered, King Von, who was also murdered in Late 2020 and finally Virgil Abloh.

== Charts ==
=== Weekly charts ===
Chart performance for "What Happened to Virgil"
| Chart (2022–2023) | Peak position |
|---|---|
| Canada Hot 100 (Billboard) | 65 |
| Global 200 (Billboard) | 35 |
| New Zealand Hot Singles (RMNZ) | 36 |
| Nigeria TurnTable Top 100 | 70 |
| South Africa Streaming (TOSAC) | 67 |
| UK Singles (Official Charts) | 70 |
| US Billboard Hot 100 | 22 |
| US Hot R&B/Hip-Hop Songs (Billboard) | 6 |
| US Rhythmic Airplay (Billboard) | 31 |

=== Year-end charts ===
2022 year-end chart performance for "What Happened to Virgil"
| Chart (2022) | Position |
|---|---|
| US Billboard Hot 100 | 83 |
| US Hot R&B/Hip-Hop Songs (Billboard) | 22 |

== Certifications ==
Certifications for "What Happened to Virgil"
| Region | Certification | Certified units/sales |
|---|---|---|
| Canada (Music Canada) | Platinum | 80,000^{‡} |
| United States (RIAA) | 2× Platinum | 2,000,000^{‡} |
^{‡} Sales+streaming figures based on certification alone.
