= Fuck My Cousin =

2022 single by Lil Zay Osama

- Cover art for the official remix "Fuck My Cousin, Pt. II"

Single by Lil Zay Osama

from the album Trench Baby 3
- Released: March 14, 2022
- Genre: Drill
- Length: 2:01
- Label: Warner
- Songwriters: Isaiah Dukes; Marcus Spruiell; Samy Kartas
- Producers: Fatman Beatzz; Vito

Lil Zay Osama singles chronology
"Glock 9" (2022)	"Fuck My Cousin" (2022)	"Fuck Yo Homie Dead Ass" (2022)

Music video
- "Fuck My Cousin" on YouTube
- "Fuck My Cousin, Pt. II" on YouTube

"Fuck My Cousin" is a song by American rapper Lil Zay Osama, released on March 14, 2022 as the lead single from his mixtape Trench Baby 3 (2022). It was produced by Fatman Beatzz and Vito. An official remix of the song titled "Fuck My Cousin, Pt. II" was released on July 29, 2022 and features American rapper Lil Durk.

== Composition ==
A drill song, it finds Lil Zay Osama rapping about his desire for vengeance against the "opps", including his own cousin. On the remix, Lil Durk asserts his position in the Chicago streets, declaring toward the end of the song, "In the 'Raq, ask the streets, I'm bigger than Yeezy, I'm the G.O.A.T. (Bigger than Yeezy)".

== Charts ==
Chart performance for "Fuck My Cousin, Pt. II"
Chart (2022)	Peak position
US Bubbling Under Hot 100 (Billboard)	10
US Hot R&B/Hip-Hop Songs (Billboard)	44

== Certifications ==
Region	Certification	Certified units/sales
United States (RIAA)	Gold	500,000^{‡}
^{‡} Sales+streaming figures based on certification alone.
