= 7220 =

Studio album by Lil Durk (2022)

Studio album by Lil Durk
- Released: March 11, 2022
- Genres: Hip-hop; drill
- Length: 47:47
- Labels: Only the Family; Alamo; Sony
- Producers: Aye Peewee; AyeTM; Ayo Bleu; Beezo; Charlie Handsome; Chase Davis; Chopsquad DJ; Coco; Cubeatz; David Morse; DB; DJ Bandz; DJ FMCT; DJ Mxngo; DJ Young Pharaoh; DKeyz; Dmac; Faatkid Goin Crazy; Grayson; Gxsha; Harto Beats; Haze; Hitmaka; Hoops; Irocconthebeat; J Thrash On The Track; JahDaGod; JiggaSosa; Jimmy Meech; Joe Reeves; John Lam; John Luther; K1ngm3; Louie Montana; LowLowTurnThatUp; Marko Lenz; MatthewFM; NFE Paris; Nuki; Oz on the Track; Pluto Brazy; Real Red; Shaad K'Rounds; SirFredo; Southside; Stg2x; Tahj Money; TM88; Too Dope; Touch of Trent; Trill Bans; TurnMeUpJosh; Uncle Cameron; Wheezy; Will-A-Fool; YC; YodaYae1K; Young T; Zypitano

Lil Durk chronology
The Voice of the Heroes (2021)	7220 (2022)	Loyal Bros 2 (2022)

7220 Deluxe cover

Singles from 7220
- 1. "Pissed Me Off" Released: October 15, 2021; 2. "Broadway Girls" Released: December 17, 2021; 3. "AHHH HA" Released: February 22, 2022; 4. "Golden Child" Released: March 10, 2022; 5. "Computer Murderers" Released: March 18, 2022; 6. "Did Shit to Me" Released: June 22, 2022

7220 is the seventh solo studio album by American rapper Lil Durk. Released through Only the Family, Alamo Records, and Sony Music on March 11, 2022, the album features guest appearances from Future, Gunna, Summer Walker, and Morgan Wallen. The reloaded edition was released on March 18, 2022, exactly one week after its release, while the deluxe edition of the album was released on June 24, 2022 and features additional appearances from Moneybagg Yo, EST Gee, Doodie Lo, Ella Mai and A Boogie wit da Hoodie. The album was supported by four singles: Pissed Me Off, Broadway Girls, Ahhh Ha, & Golden Child.

7220 received generally positive reviews from music critics. It debuted at number one on the US Billboard 200 chart, earning 120,500 album-equivalent units in its first week. Later on, the album was certified Platinum on November 30, 2022, then later being certified 2x Platinum on March 27, 2025 by the Recording Industry Association of America (RIAA), the day before his ninth studio album, Deep Thoughts released while Durk was locked up.

== Background ==
7220 refers to Durk's grandmother's address and is also the title of a book that was published by his mother, Lashawnda Woodard, the same year of its release. When he revealed the tracklist of the album, he further explained that it was also a reference to his family house that he grew up in that "made [him] the realist [sic]", on which he promised that the album would have "no skips", a phrase meaning that none of the tracks on the album could be considered of such a low quality that they should be skipped while listening through the album, track-by-track.

== Release and promotion ==
On November 4, 2021, Durk revealed the title of the album through an Instagram story. On January 12, 2022, he announced that he will go on tour for 7220, with the first show on April 8, 2022, in Phoenix, Arizona, and the last show on May 2, 2022, in his hometown of Chicago, Illinois. On January 31, 2022, he revealed that the title of the album refers to his grandmother's address and revealed that it was completed. Exactly a week later, on February 7, 2022, he announced its release date, and that it would coincide with the release of fellow Chicago rapper and previous collaborator Kanye West's eleventh studio album, Donda 2; however, both albums did not drop on the expected date and were delayed.

=== Singles ===
The lead single of the album, "Pissed Me Off", was released on October 15, 2021. The second single, "Broadway Girls", which features American country music singer Morgan Wallen, was released on December 17, 2021. The third single, "AHHH HA", was released on February 22, 2022, the day that the album was originally supposed to be released. The fourth single, "Golden Child", was released on March 10, 2022, only one day before the album. The fifth single, "Computer Murderers", was added to the album as the only new track for its reloaded edition on March 18, 2022. The lead single from the deluxe edition, and the album's sixth and final single, "Did Shit to Me" featuring American rapper Doodie Lo was released June 22, 2022, two days ahead of the deluxe edition's release.

== Critical reception ==
Professional ratings
Review scores
Source	Rating
AllMusic	3.5/5 stars
Clash	8/10
Pitchfork	6.3/10
Rolling Stone	3.5/5 stars

7220 received generally positive reviews by music critics. AllMusic stated that "while the repetitive production moves can make the beats feel somewhat interchangeable, Durk's hyperpersonalized stories of loss, betrayal, grief, and street struggles usually rise above the album's occasionally monotonous sound". Writing for Clash, Robin Murray described 7220 as "a vastly potent work, one that is unafraid to stare down ugly truths; half-in-love with the world around him, he moves from the elixir of criminality to some of his most profound observations on the art" and felt that the album "pivots between major league production and harsh introversion, with its relentlessly visceral rhymes documenting loss, addiction, and violence – against others, and against the self" and "invites the listener into Lil Durk's world, a realm framed by the spectre of death, chemical abuse, and a suffocating lack of material exits". Alphonse Pierre of Pitchfork addressed Durk melodically rapping about his childhood struggles over piano-heavy production, stating that "there are a lot of singing rappers in a similar lane, but Durk stands out because of his bruised wailing and lyrics so specific that they have to be based on some truth" and "even with the stale sound of the album, Durk is such a complex and colorful writer that it's worth it to stick it out", adding that "Lil Durk has become a huge star because of lyrics that focus in, instead of zoom out", so "for the most part, 7220 gets that". Rolling Stone music critic Will Dukes put the album as "a chill trip down memory lane, full of soothing meditations on how he made it out the mud" and "the Englewood [, Chicago] native intends for this project—named after his grandmother's address—to be a poignant snapshot of his fast life and times", adding that "most of these 17 songs are vivid retellings of what happens on the front lines"

Writing for Vulture, Craig Jenkins felt that the album "ponders the emotional fallout of a year of big achievements and crushing lows" and referred to themes of gang culture and street violence, stating; "a more eloquent rapper and a more capable vocalist now, Durk uses 7220 to show how persistent and deep-rooted these problems are", also praising Durk's rap-singing over the smooth production throughout most of the album. Vibe music critic Preezy Brown opined that "finds Durk giving autobiographical accounts that bring listeners into his world and provide a glimpse into the makings of the man behind the music", adding that "while it's still a bit early for grand proclamations, as it stands, 7220 is an admirable effort from Lil Durk and is definitely in the running for being his most well-rounded and cohesive solo effort to date".

=== Accolades ===
Rolling Stone placed 7220 at #61 in its year-end Best Albums of 2022 list, while Uproxx included it in its unranked list of the best 50 albums of the year.

== Commercial performance ==
7220 debuted at number one on the US Billboard 200 chart, earning 120,500 album-equivalent units (including 2,500 copies in pure album sales) in its first week. This became Durk's second US number one debut on the chart, following his collaborative album with fellow American rapper Lil Baby, The Voice of the Heroes (2021), and became his first chart-topping solo album. The album also accumulated a total of 164.81 million on-demand streams of the album's songs. 7220 descended one position to number two in its second week of charting on the US Billboard 200, earning 81,000 album-equivalent units, which was a 33% decrease from its debut week. In the album’s third and fourth weeks, 7220 remained at the number-two position on the US Billboard 200 chart, earning 63,000 album-equivalent units in its third week and 51,000 album-equivalent units in its fourth week. During 7220’s fifth week of charting on the US Billboard 200, the album regained the number-one position on the chart although selling a decreased amount of album-equivalent units that week, earning 47,000 album-equivalent units which made the week of April 23, 2022 the lowest selling number-one week of the year on the US Billboard 200 chart. The album’s five-week total equaled out to 362,500 album-equivalent units earned.

== Track listing ==
7220 track listing
No.	Title	Writer(s)	Producer(s)	Length
1.	"Started From"	Durk Banks; Trenton Turner; Ethan Hayes	Touch of Trent; Haze	2:01
2.	"Headtaps"	Banks; Turner; David Morse	Touch of Trent; Morse	2:53
3.	"AHHH HA"	Banks; Joshua Luellen; Bryan Simmons; Brian Roke; Lesidney Ragland; Konstantinos Latos; JiggaSosa	Southside; TM88; NFE Paris; Too Dope; Nuki; JiggaSosa	3:06
4.	"Shootout @ My Crib"	Banks; Devonte Richmond; Maliki Decampos; Jarvis Adams, Jr.	DJ Bandz; DJ FMCT; JahDaGod	2:33
5.	"Golden Child"	Banks; Tim Gomringer; Kevin Gomringer; Christian Ward; Christopher Pearson; Jorres Nelson	Cubeatz; Hitmaka; YC; Real Red	1:54
6.	"No Interviews"	Banks; Turner; Henri Velasco	Touch of Trent; Hoops	2:59
7.	"Petty Too" (featuring Future)	Banks; Nayvadius Wilburn; Roderick Hughey; Broderick Hughey; Adarsh Mani	DJ Young Pharaoh; Irocconthebeat; Zypitano	2:39
8.	"Barbarian"	Banks; David McDowell; John Lam; Roland Hannah	Dmac; Lam; Pluto Brazy	2:29
9.	"What Happened to Virgil" (featuring Gunna)	Banks; Sergio Kitchens; Darrel Jackson	Chopsquad DJ	3:01
10.	"Grow Up/Keep It on Speaker"	Banks; Morse; Julian Davis; William Byrd; Daniel Ivy; Dominic Brooks; Ridge Williams	Morse; Chase Davis; Will-A-Fool; Oz on the Track; Faatkid Goin Crazy; K1ngm3	3:16
11.	"Smoking & Thinking"	Banks; Richmond; Decampos; Cameron Hubler; Gabriel Kerr; David Cabral; YodaYae1K	DJ Bandz; DJ FMCT; Uncle Cameron; Stg2x; DKeyz; YodaYae1K	2:27
12.	"Blocklist"	Banks; Richmond; Decampos; Adams	DJ Bandz; DJ FMCT; JahDaGod	2:06
13.	"Difference Is" (featuring Summer Walker)	Banks; Summer Walker; Turner; Thomas Moore; Jocelyn Donald	Touch of Trent; AyeTM	3:13
14.	"Federal Nightmares"	Banks; Turner; Tahj Vaughn; Braylen Rembert; DJ Mxngo	Touch of Trent; Tahj Money; Ayo Bleu; DJ Mxngo	2:31
15.	"Love Dior Banks"	Banks; Rembert; Joshua Samuel; Saad Ghallab; Jeremiah Thrasher	Ayo Bleu; Turn Me Up Josh; Coco; J Thrash On The Track	3:11
16.	"Pissed Me Off"	Banks; Matthew Manuel	MatthewFM	2:03
17.	"Broadway Girls" (featuring Morgan Wallen)	Banks; Morgan Wallen; Alexander Izquierdo; Ernest Keith Smith; Grady Block; Rocky Block; Ryan Vojtesak; Joe Reeves	Charlie Handsome; Reeves	3:05
Total length:				45:27

7220 track listing for reloaded edition
No.	Title	Writer(s)	Producer(s)	Length
1.	"Computer Murderers"	Banks; Turner; Marko Cervantes	Touch of Trent; TrillBans	2:20
2.	"Started From"	Durk Banks; Trenton Turner; Ethan Hayes	Touch of Trent; Haze	2:01
3.	"Headtaps"	Banks; Turner; David Morse	Touch of Trent; Morse	2:53
4.	"AHHH HA"	Banks; Joshua Luellen; Bryan Simmons; Brian Roke; Lesidney Ragland; Konstantinos Latos; JiggaSosa	Southside; TM88; NFE Paris; Too Dope; Nuki; JiggaSosa	3:06
5.	"Shootout @ My Crib"	Banks; Devonte Richmond; Maliki Decampos; Jarvis Adams, Jr.	DJ Bandz; DJ FMCT; JahDaGod	2:33
6.	"Golden Child"	Banks; Tim Gomringer; Kevin Gomringer; Christian Ward; Christopher Pearson; Jorres Nelson	Cubeatz; Hitmaka; YC; Real Red	1:54
7.	"No Interviews"	Banks; Turner; Henri Velasco	Touch of Trent; Hoops	2:59
8.	"Petty Too" (featuring Future)	Banks; Nayvadius Wilburn; Roderick Hughey; Broderick Hughey; Adarsh Mani	DJ Young Pharaoh; Irocconthebeat; Zypitano	2:39
9.	"Barbarian"	Banks; David McDowell; John Lam; Roland Hannah	Dmac; Lam; Pluto Brazy	2:29
10.	"What Happened to Virgil" (featuring Gunna)	Banks; Sergio Kitchens; Darrel Jackson	Chopsquad DJ	3:01
11.	"Grow Up/Keep It on Speaker"	Banks; Morse; Julian Davis; William Byrd; Daniel Ivy; Dominic Brooks; Ridge Williams	Morse; Chase Davis; Will-A-Fool; Oz on the Track; Faatkid Goin Crazy; K1ngm3	3:16
12.	"Smoking & Thinking"	Banks; Richmond; Decampos; Cameron Hubler; Gabriel Kerr; David Cabral; YodaYae1K	DJ Bandz; DJ FMCT; Uncle Cameron; Stg2x; DKeyz; YodaYae1K	2:27
13.	"Blocklist"	Banks; Richmond; Decampos; Adams	DJ Bandz; DJ FMCT; JahDaGod	2:06
14.	"Difference Is" (featuring Summer Walker)	Banks; Summer Walker; Turner; Thomas Moore; Jocelyn Donald	Touch of Trent; AyeTM	3:13
15.	"Federal Nightmares"	Banks; Turner; Tahj Vaughn; Braylen Rembert; DJ Mxngo	Touch of Trent; Tahj Money; Ayo Bleu; DJ Mxngo	2:31
16.	"Love Dior Banks"	Banks; Rembert; Joshua Samuel; Saad Ghallab; Jeremiah Thrasher	Ayo Bleu; Turn Me Up Josh; Coco; J Thrash On The Track	3:11
17.	"Pissed Me Off"	Banks; Matthew Manuel	MatthewFM	2:03
18.	"Broadway Girls" (featuring Morgan Wallen)	Banks; Morgan Wallen; Alexander Izquierdo; Ernest Keith Smith; Grady Block; Rocky Block; Ryan Vojtesak; Joe Reeves	Charlie Handsome; Reeves	3:05
Total length:				47:47

7220 track listing for deluxe edition
No.	Title	Writer(s)	Producer(s)	Length
1.	"So What"	Banks; Teun Bauhuis; Grayson Serio; Manuel	Young T; Grayson; MatthewFM	2:57
2.	"Huuuh"	Banks; Shapkin Georgiy; John Balan; Justin Gibson	Gxsha; LowLowTurnThatUp; Jusvibes	2:54
3.	"Hear It Back" (featuring Moneybagg Yo)	Banks; DeMario White, Jr.; Bishop Grinnage; Clifton Ball; Mark Nikolaev	Beezo; Louie Montana; Marko Lenz	2:14
4.	"Selling Lashes"	Banks; Manuel	MatthewFM	2:21
5.	"Burglars & Murderers" (featuring EST Gee)	Banks; George Stone III; Jackson	Chopsquad DJ	2:40
6.	"Risky"	Banks; Jackson	Chopsquad DJ	3:38
7.	"Did Shit to Me" (featuring Doodie Lo)	Banks; Davis Saulsberry; STG Beats; Jimmy Meech; Richmond	STG Beats; Jimmy Meech; DJ Bandz	2:36
8.	"Smurk Outta Here"	Banks; Frédéric Lapointe; Wesley Glass	SirFredo; Wheezy	2:21
9.	"IYKYK" (featuring Ella Mai and A Boogie wit da Hoodie)	Banks; Ella Howell; Artist Dubose; Turner; Vaughn; Ryan Hartlove; Rashaad Green	Touch of Trent; Tahj Money; Harto Beats; Shaad K'Rounds	3:03
10.	"Unhappy Father's Day"	Banks; Gibson; William Ramos; Thrasher; Balan	Jusvibes; Aye Peewee; J Thrash On The Track; LowLowTurnThatUp	3:27
11.	"Expedite This Letter"	Banks; John Carolus; Darryon Bunton; Glass	John Luther; DB; Wheezy	2:23
12.	"Two Hours From Atlanta"	Banks; Jackson	Chopsquad DJ	2:29
13.	"Hearing Sirens"	Banks; Rembert; Thrasher; Ramos	Ayo Bleu; J Thrash On The Track; Aye Peewee	2:29
14.	"Computer Murderers"	Banks; Turner; Marko Cervantes	Touch of Trent; TrillBans	2:20
15.	"Started From"	Durk Banks; Trenton Turner; Ethan Hayes	Touch of Trent; Haze	2:01
16.	"Headtaps"	Banks; Turner; David Morse	Touch of Trent; Morse	2:53
17.	"AHHH HA"	Banks; Joshua Luellen; Bryan Simmons; Brian Roke; Lesidney Ragland; Konstantinos Latos; JiggaSosa	Southside; TM88; NFE Paris; Too Dope; Nuki; JiggaSosa	3:06
18.	"Shootout @ My Crib"	Banks; Devonte Richmond; Maliki Decampos; Jarvis Adams, Jr.	DJ Bandz; DJ FMCT; JahDaGod	2:33
19.	"Golden Child"	Banks; Tim Gomringer; Kevin Gomringer; Christian Ward; Christopher Pearson; Jorres Nelson	Cubeatz; Hitmaka; YC; Real Red	1:54
20.	"No Interviews"	Banks; Turner; Henri Velasco	Touch of Trent; Hoops	2:59
21.	"Petty Too" (featuring Future)	Banks; Nayvadius Wilburn; Roderick Hughey; Broderick Hughey; Adarsh Mani	DJ Young Pharaoh; Irocconthebeat; Zypitano	2:39
22.	"Barbarian"	Banks; David McDowell; John Lam; Roland Hannah	Dmac; Lam; Pluto Brazy	2:29
23.	"What Happened to Virgil" (featuring Gunna)	Banks; Sergio Kitchen; Darrel Jackson	Chopsquad DJ	3:01
24.	"Grow Up/Keep It on Speaker"	Banks; Morse; Julian Davis; William Byrd; Daniel Ivy; Dominic Brooks; Ridge Williams	Morse; Chase Davis; Will-A-Fool; Oz on the Track; Faatkid Goin Crazy; K1ngm3	3:16
25.	"Smoking & Thinking"	Banks; Richmond; Decampos; Cameron Hubler; Gabriel Kerr; David Cabral; YodaYae1K	DJ Bandz; DJ FMCT; Uncle Cameron; Stg2x; DKeyz; YodaYae1K	2:27
26.	"Blocklist"	Banks; Richmond; Decampos; Adams	DJ Bandz; DJ FMCT; JahDaGod	2:06
27.	"Difference Is" (featuring Summer Walker)	Banks; Summer Walker; Turner; Thomas Moore; Jocelyn Donald	Touch of Trent; AyeTM	3:13
28.	"Federal Nightmares"	Banks; Turner; Tahj Vaughn; Braylen Rembert; DJ Mxngo	Touch of Trent; Tahj Money; Ayo Bleu; DJ Mxngo	2:31
29.	"Love Dior Banks"	Banks; Rembert; Joshua Samuel; Saad Ghallab; Jeremiah Thrasher	Ayo Bleu; Turn Me Up Josh; Coco; J Thrash On The Track	3:11
30.	"Pissed Me Off"	Banks; Matthew Manuel	MatthewFM	2:03
31.	"Broadway Girls" (featuring Morgan Wallen)	Banks; Morgan Wallen; Alexander Izquierdo; Ernest Keith Smith; Grady Block; Rocky Block; Ryan Vojtesak; Joe Reeves	Charlie Handsome; Reeves	3:05
Total length:				83:19

Notes

- ^{^[a]} Signifies an uncredited co-producer

== Personnel ==
Credits adapted from Genius, Muso.Ai & Tidal

Technical

- Justin "Jusvibes" Gibson – Recording, Mixing, Assistant Engineer
- Nick Rice – Recording, Mixing
- Javaun "SMV" Mundle – Recording
- Rehan – Recording
- David "Dos Dias" Bishop – Recording
- Jaycen Joshua – Mixing
- Denis Kosiak – Engineer
- Caiden Rice – Assistant Engineer

== Charts ==
=== Weekly charts ===
Weekly chart performance for 7220
Chart (2022)	Peak position
Australian Albums (ARIA)	79
Belgian Albums (Ultratop Flanders)	41
Belgian Albums (Ultratop Wallonia)	141
Canadian Albums (Billboard)	2
Dutch Albums (Album Top 100)	14
French Albums (SNEP)	136
Irish Albums (Official Charts)	29
New Zealand Albums (RMNZ)	34
Norwegian Albums (VG-lista)	18
Swiss Albums (Schweizer Hitparade)	40
UK Albums (Official Charts)	6
US Billboard 200	1
US Top R&B/Hip-Hop Albums (Billboard)	1

=== Year-end charts ===
2022 year-end chart performance for 7220
Chart (2022)	Position
US Billboard 200	13
US Top R&B/Hip-Hop Albums (Billboard)	5

2023 year-end chart performance for 7220
Chart (2023)	Position
US Billboard 200	63
US Top R&B/Hip-Hop Albums (Billboard)	28

2024 year-end chart performance for 7220
Chart (2024)	Position
US Billboard 200	139

== Certifications ==
Certifications for 7220
Region	Certification	Certified units/sales
Canada (Music Canada)	Platinum	80,000^{‡}
United States (RIAA)	2× Platinum	2,000,000^{‡}
^{‡} Sales+streaming figures based on certification alone.
