= Just Cause Y'all Waited =

Album by Lil Durk (2018)

Mixtape by Lil Durk
- Released: March 30, 2018
- Length: 41:06
- Label: Only the Family; Empire
- Producer: 6ix; ATL Jacob; Cicero; DY Krazy; Go Grizzly; Jaggerwerks; Kid Wond3r; Logic; Money Bag; Nard & B; OhZone; Rex Kudo; Sonic; Supreme Beats; TM88; Will-A-Fool; XL Eagle

Lil Durk chronology
Bloodas (2017)	Just Cause Y'all Waited (2018)	Signed to the Streets 3 (2018)

Singles from Just Cause Y'all Waited
- 1. "Durkio Krazy" Released: February 18, 2018; 2. "Crossroads" Released: February 26, 2018; 3. "1(773) Vulture" Released: March 1, 2018; 4. "How I Know" Released: March 29, 2018; 5. "Home Body" Released: March 29, 2019

Just Cause Y'all Waited is the twelfth mixtape by American rapper Lil Durk. It was released on March 30, 2018, by Only the Family and Empire Distribution. The mixtape features guest appearances from Lil Baby, Ty Dolla Sign, PartyNextDoor, Gunna, and TK Kravitz. The production on the mixtape was handled by Nard & B, Supreme Beats, ATL Jacob and DY Krazy, among others.

== Background ==
On March 29, 2018, Lil Durk announced the mixtape's title, artwork and release date.

On April 11, 2018, in an exclusive interview with Billboard, Durk spoke on his departure from Def Jam Records amid creative differences and wanted to show fans the new and improved version of himself as an independent artist with the release of Just 'Cause Y'all Waited.

On April 20, 2018, Durk was featured in an exclusive interview with Respect., in which he described the inspiration for the mixtape, by saying:

It's a fresh new sound and [it's] about me doing just what I want to do. The cover was inspired by just [having] natural swag, I [liked] the picture so I decided to make it the face of the project.

== Critical reception ==
Professional ratings
Review scores
Source	Rating
Pitchfork	7.3/10

Dean Van Nguyen of Pitchfork wrote "It's the only wasted motion on Just Cause Y'all Waited, which will likely go down as a minor release in Durk's canon. Even so, this mixtape is a reminder that he's one of his city's most compelling correspondents."

== Track listing ==
No.	Title	Writer(s)	Producer(s)	Length
1.	"Public Housing"	Durk Banks; Sonic	Sonic; Kid Wond3r^{[a]}	3:18
2.	"Just Flow"	Banks; Money Bag; OhZone	Money Bag; OhZone^{[a]}	2:42
3.	"When I Was Little"	Banks; Dwan Awery; Bryan Simmons	DY; TM88^{[a]}	2:41
4.	"How I Know" (featuring Lil Baby)	Banks; Dominique Jones; Willie Byrd	Will-A-Fool	2:32
5.	"Granny Crib"	Banks; Jacob Canady	ATL Jacob	4:18
6.	"1 (773) Vulture"	Banks; Sir Robert Bryson Hall II; Arjun Ivatury	Logic; 6ix	3:18
7.	"Breather" (featuring Ty Dolla Sign and PartyNextDoor)	Banks; Tyrone Griffin, Jr.; Jahron Brathwaite; James Rosser, Jr.; Brandon Rackley	Nard & B; XL Eagle^{[a]}	4:36
8.	"Home Body" (featuring Gunna and TK Kravitz)	Banks; Sergio Kitchens; Tevin Thompson; Avery	DY; Rex Kudo^{[a]}	3:23
9.	"Durkio Krazy"	Banks; Avery; Rahshan Kyles	DY; Cicero^{[a]}	2:50
10.	"Instigator"	Banks; Kevin Price	Go Grizzly; Jaggerwerks^{[a]}	2:41
11.	"Crossroads"	Banks; Supreme Beats	Supreme Beats	4:30
12.	"My Bruddas"	Banks; Canady	ATL Jacob	4:17
Total length:				41:06

Notes

- ^{^[a]} Signifies an uncredited co-producer
- "Home Body" also appears on Lil Durk's third studio album,"Signed to the Streets 3"

Sample credits

- "1 (773) Vulture" contains interpolations of "1-800-273-8255", performed by Logic.

== Charts ==
Chart (2018)	Peak position
US Billboard 200	57
US Top R&B/Hip-Hop Albums (Billboard)	28
US Independent Albums (Billboard)	5
