= Dangerous (21 Savage, Lil Durk and Metro Boomin song) =

2024 song by 21 Savage, Lil Durk and Metro Boomin

Song by 21 Savage, Lil Durk and Metro Boomin

from the album American Dream
- Released: January 12, 2024
- Recorded: 2023
- Genre: Trap
- Length: 4:25
- Label: Epic; Slaughter Gang
- Songwriters: Shéyaa Abraham-Joseph; Durk Banks; Leland Wayne; Jahshua Brown; Jahmal Gwin
- Producers: Metro Boomin; BoogzDaBeast; Cashmere Brown

"Dangerous" is a song by British-American rapper 21 Savage, American rapper Lil Durk and American record producer Metro Boomin, taken from Savage's third studio album, American Dream (2024). It was produced by Metro Boomin, BoogzDaBeast and Cashmere Brown.

== Composition and critical reception ==
Grant Rindner of Variety considered the song one of the "standout cuts" from American Dream which show his chemistry with Metro Boomin. Reviewing the album for Uproxx, Aaron Williams stated that while songs like "Dangerous" "traverse well-worn territory for the lanky Atlantan, they coexist fairly cozily alongside latter-half ballads", adding that 21 Savage "sounds equally convincing while threatening to turn 'turn bullies to ashes'" on the song.

== Charts ==
Chart performance for "Dangerous"
Chart (2024)	Peak position
Canada Hot 100 (Billboard)	31
Global 200 (Billboard)	50
US Billboard Hot 100	35
US Hot R&B/Hip-Hop Songs (Billboard)	15
