= Lion Eyes =

2021 single by Lil Durk

Single by Lil Durk
- Released: November 12, 2021
- Genre: Hip hop
- Length: 1:52
- Label: Alamo
- Songwriters: Durk Banks; Thomas Moore; Darontez Mayo
- Producer: AyeTM

Lil Durk singles chronology
"Pissed Me Off" (2021)	"Lion Eyes" (2021)	"Rambo" (2021)

Music video
- "Lion Eyes" on YouTube

"Lion Eyes" is a song by American rapper Lil Durk. Its music video premiered on November 5, 2021 and the song was released as a single on November 12, 2021 by Alamo Records. The song was produced by AyeTM.

== Composition ==
The song features "dark" piano keys in the instrumental. It finds Lil Durk singing about successes in his life, as well as adversities, including losing his friends and violence, also conveying how one becomes involved in gang life to promote aggressive pride that hides one's insecurities. The song talks about staying strong, with Durk stating he has the "eye of a lion" and "heart of a tiger".

== Music video ==
The music video was directed by Jerry Productions and shows Lil Durk in his house, where he shows his collection of money, watches and jewelry, plays video games, and works out.

== Charts ==
Chart (2021)	Peak position
US Bubbling Under Hot 100 (Billboard)	3
US Hot R&B/Hip-Hop Songs (Billboard)	34
