= Mad Max (song) =

2022 song by Lil Durk and Future

Song by Lil Durk and Future

from the album Loyal Bros 2
- Released: December 16, 2022
- Length: 2:33
- Label: Only the Family; Empire
- Songwriters: Durk Banks; Nayvadius Wilburn; Gregory Sanders, Jr.
- Producer: HitmanAudio

Music video
- "Mad Max" on YouTube

"Mad Max" is a song by American rapper Lil Durk and Future from American record label Only the Family and Durk's collaborative compilation album Loyal Bros 2 (2022). It was produced by HitmanAudio.

== Critical reception ==
Preezy Brown of Vibe wrote favorably of "Mad Max" being one of the starting tracks of Loyal Bros 2, describing Lil Durk as "instantly setting the tone before allowing his label's artists to run rabid." In an otherwise mixed review of the album, Peter A. Berry of HipHopDX commented that "Mad Max" was one of the "times when Loyal Bros 2 soars", writing, "For 'Mad Max,' Durk plays off Future's murmuring menace, attacking pummeling 808s with threats that are so vicious and so direct that you can almost feel him sneering at you. The song title probably isn't a direct reference to the film of the same name, but the track, with its ominous chords and addictive hook, feels like a soundtrack for desert warfare."

== Controversy ==
In December 2022, the song captured public attention for lyrics addressing rapper Young Thug's RICO-related case, in which Lil Durk admits, "I could've been part of the RICO, I called Thug and told him every nigga I shot".

== Music video ==
The official music video premiered on January 19, 2023. Directed by DrewFilmedIt, it pays homage to the 2002 Jamaican film Shottas, seeing Lil Durk and Future plotting a heist in Miami. The action spans from Jamaica to there, interspersed with shots of the rappers performing in front of a massive residence. While his entourage kills the other enemies in ski masks with assault rifles, Durk fires the final shot to close the visual.

== Charts ==
Chart performance for "Mad Max"
Chart (2022)	Peak position
New Zealand Hot Singles (RMNZ)	36
US Bubbling Under Hot 100 (Billboard)	1
US Hot R&B/Hip-Hop Songs (Billboard)	36

== Certifications ==
Region	Certification	Certified units/sales
United States (RIAA)	Gold	500,000^{‡}
^{‡} Sales+streaming figures based on certification alone.
