= Signed to the Streets 3 =

Studio album by Lil Durk (2018)

Studio album by Lil Durk
- Released: November 9, 2018
- Genres: Hip-hop; drill
- Length: 70:59
- Labels: Only the Family; Alamo; Interscope
- Producers: ATL Jacob; Chopsquad DJ; Cicero; D Brooks Exclusive; Chinaman Hustle; DJ Bandz; DY Krazy; Flexico; Epikh Pro; Hitmaka; Julian Davis; Niaggi; OG Parker; Southside; TM88; Wheezy; Young Chop

Lil Durk chronology
Just Cause Y'all Waited (2018)	Signed to the Streets 3 (2018)	Love Songs 4 the Streets 2 (2019)

Singles from Signed to the Streets 3
- 1. "Spin the Block" Released: August 24, 2018; 2. "Downfall" Released: September 28, 2018; 3. "Rockstar" Released: October 19, 2018

Signed to the Streets 3 is the third studio album by American rapper Lil Durk. It is the third installment in his Signed to the Streets series, following 2014's mixtape Signed to the Streets 2. It was released on November 9, 2018, by Only the Family, Alamo Records and Interscope Records. The album features guest appearances from Gunna, Future, Ty Dolla Sign, A Boogie wit da Hoodie, Kevin Gates, TK Kravitz, Kodak Black, Young Dolph, Lil Baby, Lil Skies and Juice Wrld. The album debuted at number 17 on the US Billboard 200 in the United States.

== Commercial performance ==
Signed to the Streets 3 debuted at number 17 on the US Billboard 200 chart, earning 26,741 album-equivalent units (including 1,910 copies in pure album sales) in its first week. On May 17, 2022, the album was certified gold by the Recording Industry Association of America (RIAA) for combined sales and album-equivalent units of over 500,000 units in the United States.

== Track listing ==
No.	Title	Writer(s)	Producer(s)	Length
1.	"Treacherous"	Durk Banks; Julian Davis	Chase Davis	3:00
2.	"Don't Talk to Me" (featuring Gunna)	Banks; Sergio Kitchens; Darrel Jackson; Wesley Glass	Chopsquad DJ; Wheezy	2:56
3.	"Spin the Block" (featuring Future)	Banks; Nayvadius Wilburn; Joshua Luellen; Jacob Canady	Southside; ATL Jacob	4:22
4.	"Neighborhood Hero"	Banks; Gianni van den Brom	Niaggi	3:11
5.	"100 Grand" (featuring Ty Dolla Sign and A Boogie wit da Hoodie)	Banks; Tyrone Griffin, Jr.; Artist Dubose; Christian Ward; Jamaal Price	Hitmaka; MariiBeatz	2:39
6.	"Habit"	Banks; van den Brom	Niaggi	3:30
7.	"Skrubs"	Banks; Dwan Avery; Rahshan Kyles	DY Krazy; Cicero	4:21
8.	"Play with Us" (featuring Kevin Gates)	Banks; Kevin Gilyard; Stuart Lowery	Epikh Pro	4:24
9.	"Preach"	Banks; Gerrel Townsend; Greg Tecoz	Chinaman Hustle; G Fresh	2:38
10.	"India, Pt. 2"	Banks; Bryan Simmonds; Jackson	TM88; Chopsquad DJ	3:31
11.	"Spazz"	Banks; Wadell Brooks	D Brooks Exclusive	4:25
12.	"Home Body" (featuring Gunna and TK Kravitz)	Banks; Kitchens; Tevin Thompson; Avery; Masamune Kudo	DY Krazy; Rex Kudo	3:23
13.	"Benihana" (featuring Kodak Black)	Banks; Bill Kapri; Jackson	Chopsquad DJ	2:41
14.	"I Know"	Banks; Jackson	Chopsquad DJ	4:58
15.	"Astronomical"	Banks; Kyles; Davis; Cristian Gonzalez; Michael Dean	Cicero; Chase Davis; Flexico; Mike Dean	2:16
16.	"Downfall" (featuring Young Dolph and Lil Baby)	Banks; Adolph Thornton, Jr.; Dominique Jones; Lowery; Mathias Sorum; Phillip Cromwell; Stephen Fisher	Epikh Pro	4:26
17.	"Did for the Streets"	Banks; Joshua Parker; Jun Ha Kim; Sebastian Lopez; Mac Sutphin; Michael Lohmeier; Terence Williams	OG Parker; CVRE; 1Mind; Romano	2:45
18.	"Is What It Is"	Banks; Jackson; Luellen	Chopsquad DJ; Southside	4:22
19.	"Way More"	Banks; Devonte Richmond	DJ Bandz	4:33
20.	"Rockstar" (featuring Lil Skies)	Banks; Kimetrius Foose; Tyree Pittman; John Kadadu; Adam Dumas	Young Chop; JohnAtom	2:39
21.	"Don't Talk to Me (Remix)" (featuring Gunna and Juice Wrld)	Banks; Kitchens; Jarad Higgins; Jackson; Glass	Chopsquad DJ; Wheezy	3:43
Total length:				1:14:42

== Charts ==
=== Weekly charts ===
Chart (2018)	Peak position
Canadian Albums (Billboard)	48
Dutch Albums (Album Top 100)	143
US Billboard 200	17
US Top R&B/Hip-Hop Albums (Billboard)	8

=== Year-end charts ===
Chart (2019)	Position
US Billboard 200	199

== Certifications ==
Region	Certification	Certified units/sales
United Kingdom (BPI)	Silver	60,000^{‡}
United States (RIAA)	Gold	500,000^{‡}
^{‡} Sales+streaming figures based on certification alone.
