= Hanging with Wolves =

2022 single by Lil Durk

Single by Lil Durk

from the album Loyal Bros 2
- Released: December 9, 2022
- Genre: Drill
- Length: 3:25
- Label: Only the Family; Empire
- Songwriters: Durk Banks; Darrel Jackson; Williams Goldberg
- Producer: Chopsquad DJ

Lil Durk singles chronology
"Twin" (2022)	"Hanging with Wolves" (2022)	"Leave the Club" (2023)

Music video
- "Hanging with Wolves" on YouTube

"Hanging with Wolves" is a song by American rapper Lil Durk, released on December 9, 2022 as the second single from his and record label Only the Family's collaborative compilation album Loyal Bros 2 (2022). It was produced by Chopsquad DJ, DecayOnTheBeat, J Kari and Nile Waves.

== Content ==
Lyrically, Lil Durk raps about life in the streets and its pitfalls.

== Music video ==
A music video for the song was released alongside the single. It sees Lil Durk "wreaking havoc with his crew".

== Charts ==
Chart performance for "Hanging with Wolves"
Chart (2022)	Peak position
US Bubbling Under Hot 100 (Billboard)	3
US Hot R&B/Hip-Hop Songs (Billboard)	45
