= Broadway Girls =

Single by Lil Durk featuring Morgan Wallen (2021)

Single by Lil Durk featuring Morgan Wallen

from the album 7220
- Released: December 17, 2021
- Genre: Hip-hop; country drill; trap
- Length: 3:05
- Label: Alamo
- Songwriters: Durk Banks; Morgan Wallen; Alexander Izquierdo; Ernest Keith Smith; Grady Block; Rocky Block; Ryan Vojtesak; Joe Reeves
- Producers: Charlie Handsome; Reeves

Lil Durk singles chronology
| "Rambo" (2021) | "Broadway Girls" (2021) | "Power Powder Respect" (2022) |

Morgan Wallen singles chronology
| "Sand in My Boots" (2021) | "Broadway Girls" (2021) | "Flower Shops" (2021) |

Music video
- "Broadway Girls" on YouTube

"Broadway Girls" is a song by American rapper Lil Durk, featuring vocals from American country music singer Morgan Wallen. It was released on December 17, 2021, through Alamo as the second single from Durk's seventh studio album, 7220 (2022). "Broadway Girls" is a hip-hop and country drill song and also serves as the first time that Wallen had sung on a trap beat.

== Background ==
On October 1, 2021, Wallen posted a teaser clip on Instagram with the caption: "IDK what this is or what it's for but sounds bout right". He explained the inspiration was from Nashville's Broadway street, with the lyrics telling the story of going to a SoBro bar owned by fellow American country music singer Jason Aldean. The song described Wallen on "a night out in Downtown Nashville with a girl that he met at 'Aldeans'".

== Critical reception ==
TMZ wrote that "it's way more hip-hop flavored than country". Filiz Mustafa of HITC commented that "the rap and country crossover blends Morgan and Lil Durk's distinctive voices and styles in a surprisingly good way".

== Music video ==
The official music video, directed by Jerry Productions and Justin Clough, was released on December 20, 2021. It was filmed on Nashville's Broadway Street, which was closed down for the shoot. Durk and Wallen visit Jason Aldean's Kitchen + Rooftop bar and also walk down the empty Broadway block.

== Commercial performance ==
The song debuted at number 14 on the US Billboard Hot 100, giving Durk his highest-charting song as a lead artist up until the release of "All My Life". It also debuted at number one on the Billboard Hot R&B/Hip-Hop Songs chart, making Wallen the fourth country artist in history to do so.

== Charts ==
=== Weekly charts ===
Weekly chart performance for "Broadway Girls"
| Chart (2021–2022) | Peak position |
|---|---|
| Canada Hot 100 (Billboard) | 27 |
| Global 200 (Billboard) | 32 |
| New Zealand Hot Singles (RMNZ) | 8 |
| US Billboard Hot 100 | 14 |
| US Hot R&B/Hip-Hop Songs (Billboard) | 1 |

=== Year-end charts ===
2022 year-end chart performance for "Broadway Girls"
| Chart (2022) | Position |
|---|---|
| Canada (Canadian Hot 100) | 92 |
| US Billboard Hot 100 | 81 |
| US Hot R&B/Hip-Hop Songs (Billboard) | 18 |

== Certifications ==
Certifications for "Broadway Girls"
| Region | Certification | Certified units/sales |
|---|---|---|
| New Zealand (RMNZ) | Gold | 15,000^{‡} |
| United Kingdom (BPI) | Silver | 200,000^{‡} |
| United States (RIAA) | 5× Platinum | 5,000,000^{‡} |
^{‡} Sales+streaming figures based on certification alone.
