= Vultures (song) =

2023 single by Kanye West and Ty Dolla Sign

Single by ¥$ featuring Bump J and Lil Durk

from the album Vultures 1
- Released: November 22, 2023
- Recorded: 2023
- Genre: Trap
- Length: 4:37 (album version); 4:24 (Havoc version); 3:57 (version without Lil Durk)
- Label: YZY
- Songwriters: Ye; Tyrone Griffin, Jr.; Durk Banks; Terrance Boykin; Gustave Rudman Rambali; Cydel Young; Jason Harris; Jordan Houston; Mark Williams; Marlon Barrow; Mathias Liyew; Paul Beauregard; Pharris Thomas; Raul Cubina; Warren Trotter
- Producers: Ye; Ty Dolla Sign; Ambezza; Gustave Rudman; Jae Deal; Jasper Harris; Marlonwiththeglasses; Ojivolta; Prodbyjuice; Wheezy

¥$ singles chronology
"Vultures" (2023)	"Talking / Once Again" (2024)

Kanye West singles chronology
"Burn Everything" (2022)	"Vultures" (2023)	"Talking / Once Again" (2024)

Ty Dolla Sign singles chronology
"Ave Maria" (2023)	"Vultures" (2023)	"Talking / Once Again" (2024)

Bump J singles chronology
"So in Love" (2023)	"Vultures" (2023)

Lil Durk singles chronology
"Smurk Carter" (2023)	"Vultures" (2023)	"Old Days" (2024)

"Vultures" (stylized in all caps) is the debut single by the American hip-hop supergroup ¥$, composed of rapper Kanye West and singer Ty Dolla Sign, featuring Chicago-based rappers Bump J and Lil Durk. It is the lead single and title track from the duo's collaborative album, Vultures 1 (2024). Following a preview on WPWX Power 92 Chicago six days before its release, it was self-released on November 22, 2023. The song was written the artists alongside Cyhi the Prynce and Really Doe, with the duo producing it with Ambezza, Gustave Rudman, Jae Deal, Jasper Harris, Marlonwiththeglasses (also known as Chordz), Ojivolta, Prodbyjuice, and Wheezy.

== Background and release ==
On October 23, 2023, Ty Dolla Sign announced his collaborative album with West, tentatively titled ¥$ alongside the announcement of listening parties. However, the events eventually did not take place. Prior to the release, a snippet surfaced on the internet of Vultures. The song was later announced by DJ Pharris to be previewed on his radio show, WPWX Power 92 Chicago. This version of the song featured West alongside Ty Dolla Sign, Bump J, and Lil Durk. The track was originally released November 18, 2023, following its debut on Power 92 Chicago the night prior. However, the song was soon removed from streaming services and saw a wider rerelease on the 22nd, sans Lil Durk. Following fan backlash at his removal, a version of the song featuring Lil Durk was released on November 23, 2023.

== Composition ==
According to American Songwriter, the song is based on "a relatively gentle, easygoing trap-rap beat". The production is described as "ominous" and "crisp" by critics.

== Critical reception ==
Michael Saponara of Billboard ranked "Vultures" as the sixth best song on Vultures 1. Saponara wrote that West "came out of the gates gun blazing" after aiming for his critics and "enflaming his antisemitic controversy". A list by Chris William and Steve J. Horowitz, written for Variety, ranked it as the second-worst song of 2023. citing the line regarding antisemitism as their reasoning. Complex's Eric Skelton felt similarly, stating that the line was "regrettable headline bait" which "isn't anywhere near as clever or funny as [West] thinks it is." For Evening Standard, El Hunt wrote called the track "an overproduced and pale imitation of the raw trap sound he perfected with 2013's Yeezus", deriding its attempts to be provocative and generate controversy as "broadly flat and unimaginative."

=== Controversies ===
"Vultures" includes a lyric about West's previous antisemitic comments:

"How I'm anti-semitic? I just fucked a Jewish bitch,"

Upon the song's release, the lyric was heavily criticized by media outlets, who viewed the line as antisemitic. Several days later, a video surfaced of West and Chris Brown together at a party in Dubai dancing and laughing together to the song, which also received backlash. Brown later stated "In no way shape or form am I antisemitic! [...] I'm pro life and I make music for the entire world".

Other lyrics from the song reference the Columbine High School massacre and its perpretrators ("this ain't Columbine, but we came in with the trenches"), which drew further criticism from media outlets.

== Havoc version and music videos ==
On January 25, 2024, West posted a video on Instagram titled "Vultures Havoc Version", featuring a remix of "Vultures" produced by Mobb Deep member Havoc. West and Havoc had previously collaborated in the past, most notably on the 2016 singles "Famous" and "Real Friends". On February 8, 2024, West released the full remix, along with its music video, on Instagram, later posting it to YouTube. The music video, directed by Jon Rafman, features visuals created using generative AI.

A music video for the original version, dubbed "Vultures" (Juice Version) was posted on Instagram a few hours afterwards, directed by Aus Onda and West himself.

== Charts ==
2023 weekly chart performance for "Vultures"
Chart (2023)	Peak position
Canada (Canadian Hot 100)	83
New Zealand Hot Singles (RMNZ)	9
UK Indie (OCC)	36
US Bubbling Under Hot 100 (Billboard)	8
US Hot R&B/Hip-Hop Songs	38

2024 weekly chart performance for "Vultures"
Chart (2024)	Peak position
Australia (ARIA)	95
Australia Hip Hop/R&B (ARIA)	29
Canada Hot 100 (Billboard)	24
Global 200 (Billboard)	27
Iceland (Tónlistinn)	27
Lithuania (AGATA)	59
New Zealand (Recorded Music NZ)	39
Poland (Polish Streaming Top 100)	77
Slovakia Singles Digital (ČNS IFPI)	49
Sweden (Sverigetopplistan)	83
UK Hip Hop/R&B (Official Charts)	11
UK Indie (Official Charts)	7
UK Streaming (OCC)	50
US Billboard Hot 100	34
US Hot R&B/Hip-Hop Songs (Billboard)	15
