= Lil Zay Osama =

American rapper (born 1997)

- Born: Isaiah Jaylaun Dukes; June 3, 1997 (age 29); Douglas, Chicago, Illinois, U.S.
- Genres: Midwestern hip-hop; drill; R&B
- Occupation: Rapper
- Years active: 2011–present
- Label: Warner
- Website: lilzayosamaofficial.com

Isaiah Jaylaun Dukes (born June 3, 1997), known professionally as Lil Zay Osama, is an American rapper. His music, which he describes as "pain music", reflects his violent upbringing on the South Side of Chicago and explores subjects including grief, trauma and survival.

== Early life ==
Dukes was born on June 3, 1997, in Chicago. He lived at the Robert Taylor Homes in the Bronzeville neighborhood on the South Side until he was 10. His mother was the primary caretaker for Dukes and his five siblings; although his parents did not formally separate until he was nine, his father was in and out of jail and rarely present.

== Career ==
Inspired by his older brother, Dukes began rapping when he was 8 and recording at 10. At 12, simultaneous to the release of his first tracks and videos, he joined a gang. "Part of an emerging wave of MCs changing Chicago rap", he was initially associated with Chicago's drill scene. He used the name Lil Zay until 2010, when, as his gang-related activity ramped up, he was christened on the street as Lil Zay Osama.

In 2015, Dukes was shot in the chest, and while in the hospital, he was arrested on gun charges. At 16, he was sentenced to five years in a juvenile detention center. Committed to keeping away from the streets when he was freed, he focused on music for the duration of his incarceration, writing rap as well as songs influenced by pop and R&B.

Dukes' sentence was reduced to three years, and he was released in 2017. At 19, he returned to the South Side with a "new style, a new perspective, and a new level of determination." In 2018, he put 8 new songs on SoundCloud, and in 2019, he released Hood Bible, a collection of 14 songs that came out one by one. Hood Bible included his first hit, "Changed Up". The video for "Changed Up" received more than 20 million views on YouTube over the course of several months. Pitchfork attributed Osama's success to "relatable struggles in his lyrics" and "a realness that resonated".

In August 2019, Dukes signed with Warner Records. Among other songs, he has since released "Like a Pimp", a collaboration with Stunna 4 Vegas, "Rumors", "Ride 4 Me" featuring Jackboy and "61st to 64th". His mixtape, Trench Baby, was released on February 19, 2021.

His fourth mixtape, Trench Baby 2, was released on November 12, 2021. The mixtape contained songs featuring EST Gee, Mook6340, Benny The Butcher, Luh Kel, and Sean Kingston.

== Discography ==
=== Mixtapes ===
List of mixtapes, with selected details
Title	Details
Turn Up	Released: May 22, 2012; Label: Self-released; Format: Digital download, streaming
Hood Bible	Released: October 18, 2019; Label: Warner; Format: CD, digital download, streaming
Trench Baby	Released: February 19, 2021; Label: Warner; Format: CD, digital download, streaming
Trench Baby 2	Released: November 12, 2021; Label: Warner; Format: CD, digital download, streaming
Trench Baby 3	Released: August 12, 2022; Label: Warner; Format: CD, digital download, streaming
4 The Streets	Released: August 13, 2023; Label: Warner; Format: CD, digital download, streaming
Hood Bible 2	Released: December 15, 2023; Label: Warner; Format: CD, digital download, streaming

=== Extended plays ===
List of EPs, with selected details
Title	EP details
The Streets Calling My Name	Released: September 6, 2024; Label: Warner; Format: Digital download, streaming

=== Charted and certified singles ===
Title	Year	Peak chart positions		Certifications	Album
Title	Year	US Bub.	US R&B/HH	Certifications	Album
"Changed Up"	2019	—	—	RIAA: Gold	
"Fuck My Cousin, Pt. II" (with Lil Durk)	2022	10	44	RIAA: Gold	Trench Baby 3
