= Pissed Me Off =

2021 single by Lil Durk

Single by Lil Durk

from the album 7220
- Released: October 15, 2021
- Genre: Hip hop; drill
- Length: 2:03
- Label: Alamo
- Songwriters: Durk Banks; Matthew Manuel
- Producer: Matthewfm

Lil Durk singles chronology
"Suit Me Up" (2021)	"Pissed Me Off" (2021)	"Lion Eyes" (2021)

Music video
- "Pissed Me Off" on YouTube

"Pissed Me Off" is a song by American rapper Lil Durk. It was released on October 15, 2021, with an accompanying music video. The song was written by Durk and its producer, MatthewFM. It serves as the lead single from his seventh studio album, 7220, and marks Lil Durk's first solo single of 2021.

== Background ==
Lil Durk first teased "Pissed Me Off" in an Instagram Live on July 24, 2021, before his performance at Rolling Loud that day. On October 14, 2021, he announced the song's release date with a clip of its music video through a post to Instagram, asking for 50,000 comments on the post.

== Content ==
Jessica McKinney of Complex described the song as "hard-hitting and aggressive" and about Lil Durk rapping about "street activity, weapons, and more". Durk begins the song with a tribute to his deceased brother D-Thang. In his verse, he mentions a home invasion in July 2021 and how he and his girlfriend India Royale exchanged gunfire with the intruders. He pays tribute to rapper King Von, his close friend who was killed in November 2020.

== Music video ==
The official music video for the song, directed by Jerry Productions, was released alongside the song on October 15, 2021. It sees Lil Durk smoking marijuana and dancing in the streets. As of April 2024, it has received over 41 million views.

== Charts ==
Chart (2021)	Peak position
Canada Hot 100 (Billboard)	63
Global 200 (Billboard)	67
US Billboard Hot 100	39
US Hot R&B/Hip-Hop Songs (Billboard)	10

== Certifications ==
Region	Certification	Certified units/sales
Canada (Music Canada)	Gold	40,000^{‡}
United States (RIAA)	Platinum	1,000,000^{‡}
^{‡} Sales+streaming figures based on certification alone.
