= Ahhh Ha =

Single by Lil Durk (2022)

Single by Lil Durk

from the album 7220
- Released: February 22, 2022
- Genre: Drill
- Length: 3:06
- Label: Alamo
- Songwriters: Durk Banks; Joshua Luellen; Bryan Simmons; Brian Roke; Lesidney Ragland; Konstantinos Latos
- Producers: Southside; TM88; NFE Paris; Too Dope; Nuki

Lil Durk singles chronology
"NWA" (2022)	"Ahhh Ha" (2022)	"Golden Child" (2022)

Music video
- "Ahhh Ha" on YouTube

"Ahhh Ha" (stylized in all caps) is a diss track by American rapper Lil Durk. It was released on February 22, 2022, as the third single from his seventh studio album, 7220. The song features subliminal disses towards rapper YoungBoy Never Broke Again, who took shots at Durk's late Only the Family artist, King Von, on his single, "Bring the Hook", from his eighteenth mixtape, Colors (2022).

== Background and composition ==
The song is a response to "Bring the Hook" by rapper YoungBoy Never Broke Again. It features "a menacing, piano-led beat and threatening lyrics", and finds Lil Durk "boasting his street credentials and calling out his opposition". Durk references the deaths of his brother D-Thang and rapper King Von, whom he pays tribute to. He takes shots at YoungBoy's ex-girlfriend Jania Meshell, referencing that she was briefly linked with King Von.

== Music video ==
The music video was directed by Jerry Productions, and sees Lil Durk with his Only the Family crew. Throughout the video, Durk wears a ring paying tribute to D-Thang. He and his crew present stacks of cash and wander in the "snowed out" streets of Englewood, Chicago.

== Remixes ==
American rapper Rowdy Rebel released a freestyle of the song on March 7, 2022. Rapper 22Gz also made a remix.

== Charts ==
=== Weekly charts ===
Weekly chart performance for "Ahhh Ha"
Chart (2022)	Peak position
Canada Hot 100 (Billboard)	45
Global 200 (Billboard)	33
UK Singles (Official Charts)	99
US Billboard Hot 100	18
US Hot R&B/Hip-Hop Songs (Billboard)	4

=== Year-end charts ===
2022 year-end chart performance for "Ahhh Ha"
Chart (2022)	Position
US Hot R&B/Hip-Hop Songs (Billboard)	39

== Certifications ==
Certifications for "Ahhh Ha"
Region	Certification	Certified units/sales
Canada (Music Canada)	Platinum	80,000^{‡}
United States (RIAA)	2× Platinum	2,000,000^{‡}
^{‡} Sales+streaming figures based on certification alone.
