= King Von discography =

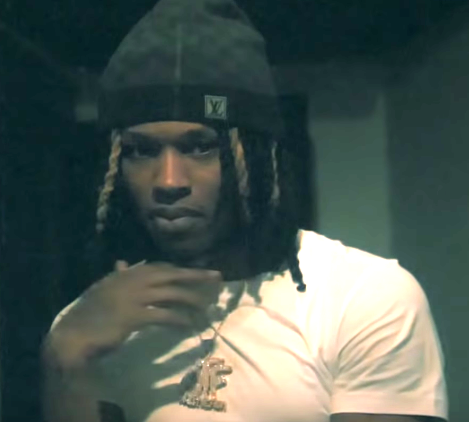
- King Von in 2019
- Studio albums: 3
- Singles: 31
- Music videos: 33
- Mixtapes: 2
- Compilation albums: 5

The discography of American rapper King Von (1994–2020) includes three studio albums (including two posthumous), two mixtapes, thirty-one singles, with ten of them being featured collaborations, and thirty-three music videos during his career. His work is known for his storytelling ability, which helped establish him as a prominent figure in the drill music scene.

King Von's career began gaining momentum with the release of his breakout single, "Crazy Story" in December 2018. The song was eventually remixed with friend and labelmate Lil Durk, which helped the song reach number 81 on the Billboard Hot 100. Due to the success of the song and its remix, an additional sequel, titled "Crazy Story, Pt. 3" was released. "Crazy Story" was later certified triple platinum by the RIAA, while Crazy Story Pt. 3 obtained a platinum certification. In September 2019, Von released his debut mixtape, Grandson, Vol. 1, which included the three installments of the "Crazy Story" series. The mixtape peaked at number 53 on the US Billboard 200 and was later certified gold by the RIAA. Following this success, Von released his second mixtape, Levon James, in March 2020. The mixtape peaked at number 40 on the Billboard 200 and received gold certification by the RIAA. Additionally, the mixtape included the track "Took Her to the O", which peaked at number 44 on the Billboard Hot 100 and was certified triple platinum.

On October 30, 2020, King Von released his debut studio album, Welcome to O'Block, under Only the Family Entertainment and Empire Distribution. The album featured collaborations with prominent artists such as Lil Durk, Polo G, Moneybagg Yo and Fivio Foreign. It peaked at number 5 on the Billboard 200 and number 2 on the Top R&B/Hip-Hop Albums chart, earning both critical and commercial success. Multiple tracks from the project, such as "Armed & Dangerous", "All These Niggas" and "The Code", were all certified platinum by the RIAA. King Von was fatally shot on November 6, 2020, just a week after the project's release.

After his passing, two posthumous albums were released: What It Means to Be King in March 2022, and Grandson in July 2023. The albums peaked at numbers 2 and 14 on the Billboard 200 respectively. King Von contributed to several compilation albums throughout his career and was featured in others as posthumous works, mainly as part of the Only the Family (OTF) label. He was featured on Only the Family Involved Vol. 1 and Only the Family Involved Vol. 2 in 2018, Family Over Everything in 2019, Loyal Bros in 2021, and Loyal Bros 2 in 2022.

== Albums ==
=== Studio albums ===
List of studio albums, with selected chart positions and certifications
Title	Album details	Peak chart positions				Certifications
Title	Album details	US	US R&B/HH	US Indie	CAN	Certifications
Welcome to O'Block	Released: October 30, 2020; Label: Only the Family, Forever and a Day, Empire; Format: LP, digital download, streaming	5	3	1	12	RIAA: Platinum; BPI: Gold

==== Posthumous albums ====
List of posthumous albums, with selected chart positions
Title	Album details	Peak chart positions				
Title	Album details	US	US R&B/HH	US Indie	CAN	NZ
What It Means to Be King	Released: March 4, 2022; Label: Only the Family, Forever and a Day, Empire; Format: CD, LP, digital download, streaming	2	1	2	3	—
Grandson	Released: July 14, 2023; Label: Only the Family, Forever and a Day, Empire; Format: CD, LP, digital download, streaming	14	1	2	31	30
"—" denotes a recording that did not chart or was not released in that territory.

=== Compilation albums ===
List of compilation albums, with selected chart positions
Title	Album details	Peak chart positions
Title	Album details	US
Only the Family Involved Vol. 1 (with Only the Family)	Released: July 31, 2018; Label: Only the Family; Format: Digital download, streaming	—
Only the Family Involved Vol. 2 (with Only the Family)	Released: December 21, 2018; Label: Only the Family; Format: Digital download, streaming	—
Family over Everything (with Only the Family)	Released: December 11, 2019; Label: Alamo, Interscope; Format: Digital download, streaming	93
Loyal Bros (with Only the Family)	Released: March 5, 2021; Label: Only the Family, Empire; Format: Digital download, streaming	12
Loyal Bros 2 (with Only the Family)	Released: December 16, 2022; Label: Only the Family, Empire; Format: Digital download, streaming	37
"—" denotes a recording that did not chart or was not released in that territory.

== Mixtapes ==
List of mixtapes, with selected chart positions and certifications
Title	Mixtape details	Peak chart positions			Certifications
Title	Mixtape details	US	US R&B/HH	US Indie	Certifications
Grandson, Vol. 1	Released: September 21, 2019; Label: Only the Family, Forever and a Day, Empire; Format: Digital download, streaming	53	30	9	RIAA: Gold
Levon James	Released: March 6, 2020; Label: Only the Family, Forever and a Day, Empire; Format: Digital download, streaming	40	21	8	RIAA: Gold

== Singles ==
=== As a lead artist ===
Title	Year	Peak chart positions					Certifications	Album
Title	Year	US	US R&B/HH	CAN	NZ Hot	WW	Certifications	Album
"Crazy Story"	2018	—	—	—	—	—	RIAA: 3× Platinum	Grandson, Vol. 1
"Cousins" (featuring JusBlow600)	2019	—	—	—	—	—		Non-album single
"Crazy Story 2.0" (featuring Lil Durk)	2019	81	32	—	—	178		Grandson, Vol. 1
"Crazy Story, Pt. 3"	2019	—	—	—	—	—	RIAA: Platinum	Grandson, Vol. 1
"2 A.M."	2019	—	—	—	—	—		Levon James
"Rollin" (featuring YNW Melly)	2019	—	—	—	—	—		Levon James
"Took Her to the O"	2020	47	14	56	18	94	RIAA: 3× Platinum; BPI: Silver	Levon James
"Grandson for President"	2020	—	—	—	—	—		What It Means to Be King
"Why He Told"	2020	—	—	—	—	—		Welcome to O'Block
"All These Niggas" (featuring Lil Durk)	2020	77	31	—	—	—	RIAA: Platinum	Welcome to O'Block
"How It Go"	2020	—	—	—	—	—	RIAA: Gold	Welcome to O'Block
"I Am What I Am" (featuring Fivio Foreign)	2020	— (Note: "I Am What I Am" did not chart on the Billboard Hot 100, but did peak at number eight on the Bubbling Under Hot 100 Singles chart.)	—	—	—	—	RIAA: Gold	Welcome to O'Block
"Gleesh Place"	2020	—	—	—	—	—		Welcome to O'Block
"The Code" (featuring Polo G)	2020	66	22	90	—	121	RIAA: Platinum	Welcome to O'Block
"Lurkin" (with Funkmaster Flex)	2020	—	—	—	—	—		TBA
"Jump" (with Lil Durk and Booka600 featuring Memo600)	2021	— (Note: "Jump" did not enter the Billboard Hot 100, but peaked at number 19 on the Bubbling Under Hot 100 chart.)	—	—	—	—		Loyal Bros
"Don't Play That" (with 21 Savage)	2022	40	11	45	14	59	RIAA: Gold	What It Means to Be King
"War"	2022	73	23	—	—	195		What It Means to Be King
"Robberies"	2023	—	—	—	20	—		Grandson
"Heartless" (featuring Tee Grizzley)	2023	—	—	—	35	—		Grandson
"Don't Miss"	2023	—	42	—	36	—		Grandson
"—" denotes a recording that did not chart or was not released in that territory.

=== As a featured artist ===
Title	Year	Certifications	Album
"Like That" (Lil Durk featuring King Von)	2019		Love Songs 4 the Streets 2
"Body Snatchers" (Yung Q featuring King Von)	2019		Non-album singles
"For a Fact" (SimXSantana featuring King Von)	2019	RIAA: Gold	Non-album singles
"Avatar" (Lil Loaded featuring King Von)	2020		Non-album singles
"Pressin" (Sada Baby featuring King Von)	2020		Skuba Sada 2 (Deluxe)
"Me and Doodie Lo" (Doodie Lo featuring King Von)	2020		Loyal Bros - Big Doodie Lo
"Slide" (Yak Yola featuring King Von)	2020		Once It's Up
"Drill Remix" (Looney Babie featuring King Von)	2020		Swindle Season
"Rose Gold" (PnB Rock featuring King Von)	2021		Non-album singles
"Nobody Move" (Muwop featuring King Von)	2021		Non-album singles
"100 Bricks" (Lil Berete featuring King Von)	2022		Non-album singles

== Other charted and certified songs ==
Title	Year	Peak chart positions					Certifications	Album
Title	Year	US	US R&B/HH	CAN	NZ Hot	WW	Certifications	Album
"Twin Nem" (feat. Lil Durk)	2019	—	—	—	—	—	RIAA: Gold	Grandson, Vol. 1
"Armed & Dangerous"	2020	— (Note: "Armed & Dangerous" did not chart on the Billboard Hot 100, but did peak at number 18 on the Bubbling Under Hot 100 Singles chart.)	—	—	—	—	RIAA: Platinum	Welcome to O'Block
"Demon"	2020	— (Note: "Demon" did not chart on the Billboard Hot 100, but did peak at number 24 on the Bubbling Under Hot 100 Singles chart.)	—	—	—	—	RIAA: Gold	Welcome to O'Block
"Back Again" (featuring Lil Durk and Prince Dre)	2020	— (Note: "Back Again" did not chart on the Billboard Hot 100, but did peak at number 11 on the Bubbling Under Hot 100 Singles chart.)	49	—	—	—	RIAA: Gold	Welcome to O'Block
"Wayne's Story"	2020	—	—	—	—	—	RIAA: Gold	Welcome to O'Block
"Still Trappin'" (with Lil Durk)	2020	53	—	—	—	93	RIAA: 2x Platinum	The Voice
"Where I'm From"	2022	— (Note: "Where I'm From" did not chart on the Billboard Hot 100, but did peak at number four on the Bubbling Under Hot 100 Singles chart.)	45	—	—	—		What It Means to Be King
"Facetime" (featuring G Herbo)	2022	92	33	—	—	—		What It Means to Be King
"Straight to It" (featuring Fivio Foreign)	2022	93	34	95	—	—		What It Means to Be King
"Trust Nothing" (featuring Moneybagg Yo)	2022	97	37	—	—	—		What It Means to Be King
"Evil Twins" (with Lil Durk)	2022	96	36	—	—	—		What It Means to Be King
"Too Real"	2022	— (Note: "Too Real" did not chart on the Billboard Hot 100, but did peak at number three on the Bubbling Under Hot 100 Singles chart.)	43	—	—	—		What It Means to Be King
"Rich Gangsta" (featuring Tee Grizzley)	2022	— (Note: "Rich Gangsta" did not chart on the Billboard Hot 100, but did peak at number 18 on the Bubbling Under Hot 100 Singles chart.)	—	—	—	—		What It Means to Be King
"My Fault" (with A Boogie wit da Hoodie)	2022	— (Note: "My Fault" did not chart on the Billboard Hot 100, but did peak at number 24 on the Bubbling Under Hot 100 Singles chart.)	—	—	—	—		What It Means to Be King
"Real Oppy" (featuring G Herbo)	2023	—	49	—	—	—		Grandson
"Phil Jackson" (with Polo G)	2023	— (Note: "Phil Jackson" did not chart on the Billboard Hot 100, but did peak at number 24 on the Bubbling Under Hot 100 Singles chart.)	36	—	—	—		Grandson
"From the Hood" (with Lil Durk)	2023	—	40	—	40	—		Grandson
"—" denotes a recording that did not chart or was not released in that territory.

== Guest appearances ==
List of non-single guest appearances, with other performing artists, showing year released and album name
Title	Year	Other performer(s)	Album
"Go Krazy"	2019	Yung Mal	Iceburg
"Straight Facts"	2019	Izy Blatt	Voice of the Streets
"Pull Up"	2020	Asian Doll	Doll Szn Reloaded
"Promote Violence"	2020	Yungeen Ace	Don Dada
"Body Count"	2020	Mozzy, G Herbo	Beyond Bulletproof
"Brand New"	2020	Calboy	Long Live The Kings
"Picasso"	2020	Sheff G, Jay Critch, Eli Fross	Just 4 Yall
"Trap Daily"	2020	OBN Jay	No Commercial Breaks
"5Stars"	2020	Ksoo	Violent Child
"Suspects"	2020	Big Osama	Norfside Dirty Mouth
"Still Trappin'"	2020	Lil Durk	The Voice
"Big Homie" (Remix)	2021	OMB Peezy, Jackboy	Too Deep for Tears
"Campbellton"	2021	Madmarcc	Not Playin
"Not Gone Play"	2021	Tee Grizzley	Built for Whatever
"Hit Em Hard"	2021	Lil Durk, Offset, Trippie Redd, Kevin Gates	F9
"Hardaway"	2021	Yungeen Ace	Life of Betrayal 2x
"Shameless"	2022	Boss Top	At Yo Neck 2
"Body Snatchers"	2023	Yung Q	God Family Cash, Vol. 3
"Legends"	2024	VonOff1700	#TurntUpNotBurntUp
