= Wayne's Story =

Song by King Von

from the album Welcome to O'Block
- Released: October 30, 2020
- Genre: Drill; gangsta rap
- Length: 2:18
- Label: Only the Family; Empire
- Songwriter: Dayvon Bennett
- Producer: Chopsquad DJ

Music video
- "Wayne's Story" on YouTube

"Wayne's Story" is a song by American rapper King Von as the sixteenth and last track from his debut studio album Welcome to O'Block from 2020. It was released on October 30, 2020.

"Wayne's Story" was certified gold plate by Recording Industry Association of America on June 3, 2022.

Like "Crazy Story," "Wayne’s Story" was created with the intention of it being a trilogy. While it was not completed, the first part of the treatment, serves as a certification to Bennett's talent and storytelling.

== Composition ==
"Wayne's Story", finds Bennett telling the story of "Shorty", a young guy from the block, going through a tumultuous life and undergoing a downward spiral into a life of crime. Going through the murder of Shorty's cousin, who dies as a result of his actions. The story ends with Shorty that takes revenge from the antagonist called "Lil Wayne".

Von explained in short the plot in one of his last interviews for Uproxx: "It’s a story about a shorty and he just grew up bad,". "He started young. He trying to hit a lick. He tries to go rob a guy named Wayne. Wayne sees him trying to rob him and they get in a shootout. The boy gets away, but Wayne ends up killing the boy’s cousin."

Iii Williams from Medium described "Wayne's Story" as an heartrending narrative that lays bare the unending cycle of conflict and vengeance, in which Bennett illustrates the challenges faced by a fourteen-year-old who opts for the gang lifestyle over education and sports. His life choices steer him towards adopting a shooter's mentality, and the subsequent retaliatory actions born out of sorrow and animosity.

This was one of Von's favorite songs from his final project, Welcome to O'Block.

The beat, which has a piano tune, was produced by Chopsquad DJ

== Music video ==
The official video was published on December 8, 2020, on YouTube platform. Bennett was also starting to put in work as a script writer, in fact he entirely wrote the screenplay for the video, that was directed by Joán, and as he himself stated in an interview, it was filmed in the exact same set of "Why He Told" song, and for which it needed 13 hours of filming for each of the single music videos.

It depicts the young man, "Shorty" that's shoots someone at a dice game, and eventually going down to a path of bank robberies and home invasions, mainly cinematically retracing everything that describes the song. All this is shown through the lens of King Von, who witnesses the story play out in front of him. Shorty's story is yet to be concluded by the end of the video.

Wayne's Story video garnered over two million views on YouTube in just 12 hours.

== Critical reception ==
On January 4, 2021, the magazine Medium described "Wayne's Story" as a storytelling tune that takes on a more conventional narrative approach, describing Von's tone as unique and his delivery infusing the song with an originality that seizes the listener's focus right from the outset; and also saying that despite the melancholic nature of the content, the song's execution is truly compelling, with Von that doesn't squander a single breath, delivering meticulously crafted lyrics and a well written hook that draws attention.

== Certifications ==
Region	Certification	Certified units/sales
United States (RIAA)	Gold	500,000^{‡}
^{‡} Sales+streaming figures based on certification alone.
