= Armed & Dangerous (song) =

Song by King Von

from the album Welcome to O'Block
- Released: October 30, 2020
- Genre: Drill; gangsta rap
- Length: 2:03
- Label: Only the Family; Empire
- Songwriter: Dayvon Bennett
- Producer: Chopsquad DJ

Music video
- "Armed & Dangerous" on YouTube

"Armed & Dangerous" is a song by American rapper King Von. It was released on October 30, 2020, and it serves as the opening track of his debut studio album Welcome to O'Block from October 2020.

"Armed & Dangerous" was certified platinum by Recording Industry Association of America on February 16, 2023. and it peaked at number eight on the Bubbling Under Hot 100 chart by Billboard.

== Composition ==
In the track, Bennett employs a refined storytelling technique to describe being pursued by federal authorities due to his past, as reported by Revolt: "Police steady watching me, every day they clocking me, red alert, armed and dangerous, I keep that Glock on me" and also: "cause I done did shit that n***as ain’t talking ‘bout no rapping beef"; consequently, he references the 2011–2014 period, recounting violent conflicts with his opps, a term denoting rivals or opposition. He also mentions Chief Keef, highlighting his role in popularizing O'Block and bringing the feud with the Gangster Disciples into mainstream awareness, which in turn contributed to the rise of the drill genre. Additionally, he reflects on his uncle’s crack addiction, his significant influence on Bennett’s life, and his passing while he was incarcerated. The beat is a drill instrumental, produced by Chopsquad DJ.

== Music video ==
Bennett revealed to Uproxx that he was involved in the creation of each of his music videos, showcasing his strong creative ability in writing the scripts, including for the video of "Armed & Dangerous". Additionally, according to Respect, Bennett aimed to demonstrate, through this song and its music video, how the lessons he learned during his time incarcerated, shaped his worldview, even as a successful rapper.

The music video was released on January 11, 2021 on YouTube. It was directed by Jerry Productions, it features King Von in various locations: from his suburban residence, where he is seen doing everyday activities, such as taking a trash can to the curb while being observed from a distance by suspected law enforcement officers who view him as a menace; to a prison setting. In the latter, Von is shown wearing an orange jumpsuit, rapping to his cellmate and playing basketball with fellow inmates inside the prison courtyard.

"Armed & Dangerous" musical video reached over 1.7 million views in less than one day on YouTube.

King Von's original plan, as stated in his final Twitter post, was to release this music video on November 6, 2020. However, due to his passing, the video was instead released after the drop of the official video for "Wayne's Story", making it the second posthumous video of the artist and the eighth overall from the project.

== Critical reception ==
On January 4, 2021, iii Williams described the song as "a blunt and brutally open recount of the events and moments that have helped turn a young kid into a man with a past that he’s not necessarily proud of but doesn’t apologize for either." and also said that the dates and individuals referenced on the song effortlessly convey to the audience that Von is well aware of the consequences of his chosen lifestyle, and the costs associated with it; and that while the track is undeniably engaging, it vividly portrays a reality that may remain elusive or enigmatic to many.

== Charts ==
Chart (2020)	Peak position
US Bubbling Under Hot 100 (Billboard)	8

== Certifications ==
Region	Certification	Certified units/sales
United States (RIAA)	Platinum	1,000,000^{‡}
^{‡} Sales+streaming figures based on certification alone.
