= 2 A.M. (King Von song) =

2019 single by King Von

Single by King Von

from the album Levon James
- Released: November 16, 2019
- Genre: Hip hop; drill
- Length: 2:00
- Label: Only the Family; Empire
- Songwriters: Dayvon Bennett; Darrel Jackson
- Producer: Chopsquad DJ

King Von singles chronology
"Crazy Story, Pt. 3" (2019)	"2 A.M." (2019)	"Rollin" (2020)

Music video
- "2 A.M." on YouTube

"2 A.M." is a song by American rapper King Von. It is the fourth track and first single from his second mixtape Levon James from 2020. The song was released on November 16, 2019. and it was produced and written in collaboration with Chopsquad DJ.

== Composition ==
"2 A.M." by King Von is a compelling narrative that delves into the realities of life in Chicago's South Side. The song vividly portrays the experiences one might encounter while navigating the streets during the late hours. The song stays true to the traditional drill sound, with a menacing instrumental, which let Von deliver his verses with an intense fervor, embodying a sense of vengeance and determination. It encapsulates the raw essence of urban life, particularly highlighting the tensions and conflicts present in gang-ridden neighborhoods. In the song's hook, Bennett vividly narrates the experience of leaving the club at 2 a.m. only to encounter rival gang members outside. His lyrics paint a gritty picture of the streets, with lines like "It's 2 a.m., we leavin' the club/ Heard the opps outside," capturing the tension and danger of the situation. The refrain "Did 'em dirty now it's hot outside" further emphasizes the retaliation and consequences that follow such encounters.

The song shares similar title and storytelling type of narrative with song "3 A.M", that's also contained on the same project Levon James.

== Music video ==
The music video for "2 A.M." was released on November 16, 2019, on YouTube platform, three days prior to the official distribution of the song on streaming platforms, it was produced by Drewfilmedit. The visuals offers a captivating and vibrant visual representation of the song's narrative with Bennett and his friends as the main subjects of the music video.

== Critical reception ==
David Crone of AllMusic commends "2 A.M." for its skillful execution of drill narratives over a stuttering beat. In his review, that's centered on the whole Levon James mixtape, Crone highlights King Von's ability to vividly depict urban realities, noting the song's captivating storytelling and relentless instrumental.
