= Welcome to O'Block =

Studio album by King Von
- Released: October 30, 2020
- Recorded: 2020
- Genres: Hip-hop; drill; gangsta rap
- Length: 43:00
- Labels: Only the Family; Empire
- Producers: Chopsquad DJ (exec.); DJ Ayo; Dnny Phntm; Hitmaka; JTK; LC; Pooh Beatz; Tay Keith; Turn Me Up Josh; Wheezy; Will-A-Fool

King Von chronology
Levon James (2020)	Welcome to O'Block (2020)	What It Means to Be King (2022)

Singles from Welcome to O'Block
- 1. "Why He Told" Released: July 24, 2020; 2. "All These Niggas" Released: August 5, 2020; 3. "How It Go" Released: August 28, 2020; 4. "I Am What I Am" Released: October 9, 2020; 5. "Gleesh Place" Released: October 23, 2020; 6. "The Code" Released: October 30, 2020

Welcome to O'Block is the debut studio album by American rapper King Von, and the only studio album to be released during his lifetime. It was released on October 30, 2020 by Only the Family and Empire Distribution. Welcome to O'Block was released a week prior to King Von's death on November 6, 2020, after the album's official release party. The project features chief production from Chopsquad DJ, and other producers including Hitmaka, Tay Keith and Wheezy; guest appearances include Polo G, Lil Durk, Dreezy, Moneybagg Yo, Fivio Foreign and Prince Dre.

Welcome to O'Block was supported by six singles: "Why He Told", "All These Niggas", "How It Go", "I Am What I Am", "Gleesh Place" and "The Code". The album received positive reviews from music critics and peaked at number five on the US Billboard 200. It received platinum certification by the Recording Industry Association of America (RIAA) and was awarded a gold certification by the British Phonographic Industry.

"O'Block" in the album title is a reference and other name to design the Parkway Gardens complex in the Greater Grand Crossing community area on the South Side of Chicago, where King Von was raised.

== Content ==
Bennett explained the key difference between his mixtape Levon James, released earlier that same year, and Welcome to O'Block: "If you're doing something and keep doing it, you're gonna get better results. Everything better. It is the one for real, I've been working hard." Complex said the album sees Von "reflecting with an acute lyrical clarity on his rise and how newfound fame could impact his own life and the lives of his loved ones", while Revolt noted of the drill album: "Often rapping about Chicago and his well-respected neighborhood, this album most certainly paints the vivid picture of his cinematic lyrics while portraying his stand-out cadences through each record".

== Release and promotion ==
The album release culminates the end of a prolific year for Bennett who claims to have worked hard on his music and technique. The album came after Levon James, his second mixtape released in March 2020; he also declared that thanks to his perseverance and work put into the project, Welcome to O'Block would surpass his previous projects in terms of quality. The singles numbers before the release showed a leap compared to the previous work, on the merits single "All These Niggas" acquired, as stated by Bennett himself, over 24 million views 2 months after its release.

In his interview for Uproxx, Bennett stated that the music he was making was dedicated to the people who lived in his neighborhood and who, like him, lived a life of hardship and danger. He also declared that his storytelling rapping comes from his sojourn in prison where he read books and urban novels most of the time; still said that his favorite piece over the whole album was "Demon".

Three days before the album publication, on 27 October King Von appeared in a video for the YouTube channel "CivilTV" named "Welcome to My Neighborhood: O Block", in whose Von talks about his life in Parkway Garden, tells anecdotes about it and about how he got into rapping, even anticipating some details on the new album. In the same video he even goes in his old neighborhood named "Killaward".

Welcome to O'Block was released on October 30, 2020.

== Singles ==
"Why He Told", the lead single from the album, was released on July 24, 2020, along with a music video. The video tracks with the lyrics, opening on a female officer activating a recorder and rewinds through the guilty visions of a friend of Von which is revealed to be an informant, who imagines Von pursuing him and wakes up in cold sweats from the guilt of having told. Bennett also made a live piano version of the song in conjunction with "Took Her to the O" song from Levon James mixtape, for Audiomack streaming platform; it was released with a video on August 13, 2020, on YouTube.

"All These Niggas", the second single from the album, it features Lil Durk, and was released on August 5, 2020, with an accompanying music video directed by JV Visuals 312. On the track the two rappers deliver vicious bars about the bleak reality of the streets, with a hook sung by Bennett himself, on an Eerie piano keys drill instrumental. The video finds King Von posted up in a white Rolls Royce and rocking a massive diamond Only The Family chain as raps about life in the hood. Durk does not appear in the visual, because of their open case they could not stay in the same place. Durk did not appear in the video.

"How It Go", the third single from the album produced by Chopsquad Dj, was released on August 28, Von declared to have wrote the lyrics while being locked up in jail. In the "How It Go" video, Von addresses the shortcomings of the justice system rapping about what goes on behind the closed doors of a criminal trial. On the first half of the video focuses on the negotiations between prosecutors and public defenders which often result in plea deals, and it shows Bennett struggling to survive in prison. The latter half of the video exhibits Bennett getting out and scrambling to survive, now outside the prison, and having all doors closed up from society.

"I Am What I Am", the fourth single from the album, was released on October 9, 2020. It features a guest appearance from Fivio Foreign over production from ChopsquadDJ. The official video is directed by Jerry Production, the accompanying visual shows Fivio with King Von in the Chicago trenches, flexing money, whips, jewelry, and more. The song extablish connection between the Chicago and New York drill worlds as never seen before

"Gleesh Place", the fifth single from the album with whom he anticipated the same project. It was released on October 23, 2020, with an official music video released the day before his album dropping date, on October 29, which sees Von rapping about typical Chicago street life over a beat by Wheezy Productions.

"The Code" was released on October 30, 2020, alongside the album and a music video with the direction of DrewFilmedIt. It features a guest appearance from Polo G. The sci-fi-horror oriented video sees Von and Polo using a computer program to entrap their enemies, whom they spend the rest of the video torturing with the help of a female assistant. The beat is a sinister piano loop produced by JTK, Dj Ajo and Lc; while the titular "Code" refers to the code of the streets.

== Music videos ==
Beyond of those published as singles, four other videos pertaining to Welcome to O'Block have been released, all posthumous. The first was the video for "Wayne's Story", that was published on December 8, 2020, barely a month after Bennett's demise. The second video is represented by "Armed & Dangerous", that was, in the first place, scheduled to be released on November 6, 2020, under the idea of Bennett himself, but was later postponed, due to his passing, to the date of January 11, 2021. Still the 21 of April, 2021 "Mine Too" video was released; lastly concluding the project cycle with the last video for "Demon" on the day of his hypothetical 27th birthday which was August 9, 2021.

== Critical reception ==
Professional ratings
Review scores
Source	Rating
AllMusic	4/5 stars
Basketrap	8.2/10
HipHopDX	4.2/5
Pitchfork	6.8/10
Sputnikmusic	4.5/5

Welcome to O'Block received acclaim from critics. Fred Thomas of AllMusic magazine, eulogize the Chicago rapper's storytelling ability and the "humanization" of Welcome to O'Block characters saying: "the cast of characters we meet over the course of Welcome to O'Block have names, ages, choices we watch them struggle with, and stories that are hard to ignore"; he also accents some songs such as "Back Again", "The Code", "Demon", and "How It Go"." Writing for HipHopDX Josh Svetz defines the album as "Versatile" as it varies from energetic drill songs going through harmonized ones and still has others "sentimental ballads"; he concludes saying that "Welcome To O’Block is the type of debut album rappers strive for: a relentless and engaging showcase of superior talent setting them up for a long and prosperous career" adding though "now becomes his curtain call, a tragic reminder of what could have been"." Dean Van Nguyen by Pitchfork Defines the project with a more "Nuanced set" than his previous work Levon James, moving from a full album of gangsterism to a larger and more varied album; he also highlights track "All These Niggas" and the last three pieces of the work, defining them the best part of the project; finally ending with the sentence: " King Von wrote about a world that was bleak. His passing just makes it all the more so"." Tom Brehian from Stereogum defines "Wayne's Story" as his best work to date, appreciating the third-person narration that characterizes the piece, and he goes on to say that it has been a long time since a rapper so promising in storytelling has appeared. Iii Williams described the Chicago rapper project as characterized by "charismatic storytelling and versatile delivery", and that incorporates songs with various tones and flows, all while maintaining his patented aggression and confidence in rapping. It is also mentioned Bennett astonishing growth within the rap game in an impressively brief span of time, that is shown on his record. Almost all of the songs received positive reviews, with "Can’t Relate", "Demon" and "The Code" being considered the best songs on the entire album. Williams also stated that there was a unanimous agreement that King Von was poised to be the next superstar in the hip-hop; and he also declared "Welcome to O’Block is one of the most important projects in the city of Chicago’s history, and was one of the most impressive projects of 2020 overall".

== Commercial performance ==
Welcome to O'Block gained great success across the country, gaining over 26,000 album-equivalent units (including 1,000 copies in pure album sales) in its first week, and over 46,000 in the second week, peaking at number 5 on Billboard 200 for US albums; it also reached number 1 on the Top R&B/Hip-Hop Albums chart, and topped the Top Independent Albums chart, while peaking at number 12 on the Top 100 Canadian albums chart.

Welcome to O'Block achieved RIAA platinum certification on December 20, 2024, with over a million of copies sold in the US, and was awarded a gold certification by the BPI on August 7, 2026, for selling over 100,000 copies in the UK.

== Track listing ==
Welcome to O'Block track listing
No.	Title	Writer(s)	Producer(s)	Length
1.	"Armed & Dangerous"	Dayvon Bennett; Darrell Jackson	Chopsquad DJ	2:02
2.	"GTA"	Bennett; Jackson	Chopsquad DJ	2:01
3.	"Demon"	Bennett; Jackson	Chopsquad DJ	2:13
4.	"Mine Too"	Bennett; Darryl Clemons; Joshua Samuel; Christian Ward	Pooh Beatz; Turn Me Up Josh; Hitmaka	2:54
5.	"The Code" (featuring Polo G)	Bennett; Taurus Bartlett; Luke Clay; Jordan Knight; Jahmere Tylon	LC; JTK; DJ Ayo	3:22
6.	"Why He Told"	Bennett; Jackson	Chopsquad DJ	3:08
7.	"Back Again" (with Prince Dre featuring Lil Durk)	Bennett; Durk Banks; Deandre Campbell; Brytavious Chambers; Daniel Wagner Cash	Tay Keith; Dnny Phntm	2:31
8.	"Gleesh Place"	Bennett; Wesley Glass	Wheezy	1:34
9.	"All These Niggas" (featuring Lil Durk)	Bennett; Banks; Jackson	Chopsquad DJ	2:24
10.	"Can't Relate"	Bennett; Jackson; Willie Byrd	Chopsquad DJ; Will-A-Fool	2:40
11.	"Mad At You" (featuring Dreezy)	Bennett; Seandrea Sledge; Jackson	Chopsquad DJ	3:14
12.	"Ain't See It Coming" (featuring Moneybagg Yo)	Bennett; Demario White, Jr.; Jackson	Chopsquad DJ	2:43
13.	"I Am What I Am" (featuring Fivio Foreign)	Bennett; Maxie Ryles III; Jackson	Chopsquad DJ	3:38
14.	"Ride"	Bennett; Jackson	Chopsquad DJ	2:22
15.	"How It Go"	Bennett; Jackson	Chopsquad DJ	3:52
16.	"Wayne's Story"	Bennett; Jackson	Chopsquad DJ	2:18
Total length:				43:04

Notes

- ^{^[a]} Signifies an uncredited co-producer

== Personnel ==
Credits adapted from Genius, Muso.Ai & Tidal

Technical

- CakeBoy Bally – Recording
- Darth Moon – Recording
- Kiid Maestro – Recording
- EY3ZLOWBEATZ – Recording
- Shawn "Source" Jarrett – Recording, Mixing
- Shepard Hues – Mixing
- Justiiice – Mixing
- JaymeWorld – Recording, Mixing
- JTK – Mixing
- Joe LaPorta – Mastering
- Heavy L Beatz – Mastering, Assistant Engineer, Assistant Mixer

== Charts ==
=== Weekly charts ===
Weekly chart performance for Welcome to O'Block
Chart (2020–2022)	Peak position
Canadian Albums (Billboard)	12
US Billboard 200	5
US Top R&B/Hip-Hop Albums (Billboard)	3
US Independent Albums (Billboard)	1

=== Year-end charts ===
Year-end chart performance for Welcome to O'Block
Chart (2021)	Position
US Billboard 200	107
US Top R&B/Hip-Hop Albums (Billboard)	61

== Certifications ==
Region	Certification	Certified units/sales
Denmark (IFPI Danmark)	Gold	10,000^{‡}
United Kingdom (BPI)	Gold	100,000^{‡}
United States (RIAA)	Platinum	1,000,000^{‡}
^{‡} Sales+streaming figures based on certification alone.
