= Family over Everything =

Family Over Everything

Compilation album by Lil Durk and Only the Family
- Released: December 11, 2019
- Genre: Hip hop; drill
- Length: 41:45
- Label: Only the Family; Alamo; Interscope
- Producer: ABOnTheBeat; Chopsquad DJ; Niaggi; Sonic; 12Hunna; Based Kash; Big A; Deltah Beats; DJ Swift; DY; Flight Klub; Gunboi; Jaggerwerks; James Maddocks; John Lam; KidWond3r; Magestik; Pvlace; Richie Souf; Rott; Super; Trademark; Will A Fool; Yenn Beats

Only the Family chronology
Only the Family Involved, Vol. 2 (2018)	Family Over Everything (2019)	Loyal Bros (2021)

Lil Durk chronology
Love Songs 4 the Streets 2 (2019)	Family Over Everything (2019)	Just Cause Y'all Waited 2 (2020)

Singles from Family Over Everything
- 1. "Blika Blika" Released: November 22, 2019; 2. "Riot" Released: December 6, 2019

Professional ratings
Review scores
Source	Rating
AllMusic	3.5/5 stars

Family Over Everything is a compilation album by American record label and hip-hop group Only the Family, and its founder, American rapper Lil Durk. It was released on by the label alongside Alamo Records and Interscope Records on December 11, 2019. The album features guest appearances from Jusblow600, King Von, NLE Choppa, Polo G, Booka600, C3, G Herbo, Lil Tjay, MK, OTF Ikey, Doodie Lo, and Memo600. It peaked at number 93 on the Billboard 200 in the United States.

== Track listing ==
No.	Title	Writer(s)	Producer(s)	Length
1.	"Gang Forever" (featuring JusBlow600 and King Von)	Durk Banks; Justin Mitchell; Dayvon Bennett; Darrell Jackson	Chopsquad DJ	2:29
2.	"High Tolerance" (featuring NLE Choppa)	Banks; Bryson Potts; Andre Neves; David Veiga; Gianni van den Brom	Magestik; Niaggi	2:26
3.	"Brazy Krazy"	Banks; Norris Buchanan; Richard Norris	Flight Klub	2:30
4.	"Career Day" (featuring Polo G)	Banks; Taurus Bartlett; Eric Sandoval	Sonic	2:39
5.	"They Be Talkin'" (featuring King Von)	Banks; Bennett; Jeremy Duckworth	Super	2:48
6.	"The Hood" (performed by Booka600)	Darontez Mayo; John Lam; Tyler Maline; Logan Forsythe	Lam; Trademark; ABOnTheBeat	3:11
7.	"Blika Blika"	Banks; Anthony Beechan; Dwan Avery; Michael O'Brien	12Hunna; DY; KidWond3r	2:04
8.	"On Stone" (performed by C3)	Carlee Cassidy; Thomas Sanders; James Maddocks	Based Kash; Maddocks	1:42
9.	"Riot" (with Booka600 featuring G Herbo)	Banks; Mayo; Herbert Wright III; Tchakalla Romeo; van den Brom; Denis Berger	Gunboi; Niaggi; Pvlace	3:02
10.	"This a Story" (performed by King Von)	Bennett; Jackson	Chopsquad DJ	2:26
11.	"Fake Love" (featuring Lil Tjay)	Banks; Tione Merritt; Tony Son	Richie Souf	3:22
12.	"Whole Lotta"	Banks; Sandoval	Sonic	2:45
13.	"Better" (performed by MK)	Malik Key; Yann Grandfils	Yenn Beats	3:17
14.	"One Mo Chance"	Banks; Damion Williams; Willie Byrd	DJ Swift; Will A Fool	3:00
15.	"Bad Bitch" (performed by OTF Ikey)	Michael Patterson; Adrian Appleby; Bruce Billingy	Big A; Jaggerwerks	2:02
16.	"Hang Out" (performed by Doodie Lo and Memo600)	David Saulsberry; Melvin Griffin; Raymond Herring; Vincent Boyles	Deltah Beats; Rott	2:06
Total length:				41:45

== Charts ==
Chart (2019)	Peak position
US Billboard 200	93
US Top R&B/Hip-Hop Albums (Billboard)	42
