= Demon (King Von song) =

Song by King Von

from the album Welcome to O'Block
- Released: October 31, 2020
- Genre: Drill; gangsta rap
- Length: 2:13
- Label: Only the Family; Empire
- Songwriter: Dayvon Bennett
- Producer: Chopsquad DJ

Music video
- "Demon" on YouTube

"Demon" is a song by American rapper King Von. It was released on October 31, 2020, as an extract from Von's debut studio album Welcome to O'Block from 2020. The song was certified gold plaque by Recording Industry Association of America on June 3, 2022.

== Composition ==
"Demon" is an emotional and melodic song, in which Bennett details with a storytelling his pre-fame life, pays tribute to his crew, and carrying the responsibility of representing his block everywhere he goes.

The instrumental was produced by the artist's frequent collaborator Chopsquad DJ.

== Music video ==
The music video was released on August 9, 2021. It is the fourth video extracted from the Welcome to O'Block studio album. It was directed by DrewFilmedIt and Joan Pabon, and was premiered by BET. The visual was entirely ideated by Bennett himself, in fact the video ends after the conclusion of the song with a recording by Bennett describing in detail his vision for the video.

The video depicts many of the situations Bennett depicts in the lyrics with the scenes revolving around Bennett, who comes out of a liquor store after hearing some gunshots, following which he sees his longtime friend Whitey (also known as White White) on the ground lifeless, the police ask questions to Bennett himself who says nothing, the shots then alternate with a frontal plan of Bennett himself who is represented with demon eyes, and another scene where Bennett is in a room full of felons, all apparently dangerous, with marks on the face and with important physical prowess, but at the proposal of Bennett himself for these people to take his shoes, they refuse, as if to metaphorically admit that they cannot do what Bennett has done in his life in the streets.

== Charts ==
| Chart (2020) | Peak position |
|---|---|
| US Bubbling Under Hot 100 (Billboard) | 24 |

== Certifications ==
| Region | Certification | Certified units/sales |
|---|---|---|
| United States (RIAA) | Gold | 500,000^{‡} |
^{‡} Sales+streaming figures based on certification alone.
