= I Am What I Am (King Von song) =

Single by King Von featuring Fivio Foreign

from the album Welcome to O'Block
- Released: October 9, 2020
- Genre: Chicago drill; Brooklyn drill; gangsta rap
- Length: 3:38
- Label: Only the Family; Empire
- Songwriters: Dayvon Bennett; Maxie Lee Ryles III
- Producer: Chopsquad DJ

King Von singles chronology
"How It Go" (2020)	"I Am What I Am" (2020)	"Gleesh Place" (2020)

Fivio Foreign singles chronology
"Bop It" (2020)	"I Am What I Am" (2020)	"Trust" (2020)

Music video
- "I Am What I Am" on YouTube

"I Am What I Am" is a song by American rapper King Von featuring a guest appearance from New York rapper Fivio Foreign it is the fourth single extracted from his debut studio album Welcome to O'Block released in 2020. The song was released through OTF and Empire labels on October 9, 2020. It extablishes connection between the Chicago and New York drill worlds as never seen before

"I Am What I Am" peaked at number eight on the Bubbling Under Hot 100 chart by Billboard. In December 2020 was included in season 1, episode 8 of the TV series Power Book II: Ghost.

== Background ==
The song dropped on the expected release date of Welcome to O'Block that was instead delayed by Von after having a dream about his late friend T. Roy and wanting to commemorate his friend birthday by also releasing his album on October 30, as stated by himself on his official Twitter page.

In an interview for Grammy Awards King Von said he linked up with Fivio Foreign because he thought the New York artist would have been great for the beat that was already been done.

== Composition ==
The song is defined "propulsive" by HipHopDx with Fivio coming first with a fiery opening verse where he pays homage to the late Pop Smoke. King Von makes the hook, which has the internal logic of a street nursery rhyme: "I am what I am/What I'm not, See i'll never be." He also raps the second verse of the tune, in which he puts his vivid storytelling on display with more frightening street tales. The Source describes their performance as a passing bars back and forth, while showing elite drill chemistry.

The beat was produced by Chopsquad DJ.

== Music video ==
The official video was released the same day of the single drop, and is directed by Jerry Production. It finds Von and Fivio on O'Block, bringing dozens of supporters to Von's native O Block, as they sip Henny, count cash, and whip around in a Rolls Royce Wraith. The two emcees light up the block with their electric chemistry, evoking the chaotic energy of the earliest Chicago and Brooklyn drill music videos.

== Charts ==
Chart (2020)	Peak position
US Bubbling Under Hot 100 (Billboard)	8

== Certifications ==
Region	Certification	Certified units/sales
United States (RIAA)	Gold	500,000^{‡}
^{‡} Sales+streaming figures based on certification alone.
