= They Forgot =

Mixtape by Lil Durk
- Released: November 26, 2016
- Recorded: 2016
- Genre: Hip hop; drill; trap
- Length: 43:04
- Label: Only the Family
- Producer: DJ Bandz (also exec.); Bigga Rankin (also exec.); C-Sick; ChopSquad DJ; Donis Beats; DP Beats; Kid Wonder; London on da Track; TY Made It; Young Chop

Lil Durk chronology
Lil Durk 2X (2016)	They Forgot (2016)	Signed to the Streets 2.5 (2017)

Singles from They Forgot
- 1. "Baller" Released: November 18, 2016

They Forgot is a mixtape by American hip hop rapper Lil Durk. It was released on November 26, 2016, by Only the Family. The mixtape features guest appearances from Lil Reese, Meek Mill, Mozzy, OTF Ikey, 21 Savage, Hypno Carlito, Dej Loaf, YFN Lucci, and BJ the Chicago Kid. While the production was handled by C-Sick, ChopSquad DJ, Donis Beats, DP Beats, LeekeLeek, Kid Wonder, London on da Track, TY Made It, and Young Chop. The mixtape is supported by the single "Baller".

== Track listing ==
No.	Title	Writer(s)	Producer(s)	Length
1.	"Intro"	Durk Banks		1:45
2.	"They Forgot"	Banks; Alkhaaliq Omar Lawrence	Kid Wonder	3:26
3.	"Too Late"	Banks; Charles Dumazer	C-Sick	3:15
4.	"Hard Shit" (featuring Lil Reese)	Banks; Lawrence; Tavares Taylor	Kid Wonder	2:48
5.	"Baller"	Banks	TY Made It	3:32
6.	"Rico"	Banks; Adonis Amos-Staton	Donis Beats	2:29
7.	"Young Niggas" (featuring Meek Mill)	Banks; Robert Williams; London Holmes	London on da Track	2:52
8.	"We Dem Niggas" (featuring Mozzy and OTF Ikey)	Banks; Dumazer; Timothy Patterson	C-Sick	4:09
9.	"Shooters 2x" (featuring 21 Savage)	Banks; Don Paschall, Jr.; Shayaa Joseph	DP Beats	3:20
10.	"Back 2 Back" (featuring Hypno Carlito)	Banks	TY Made It	2:37
11.	"Victim"	Banks; Tyree Pittman	Young Chop	3:52
12.	"Rider Chick" (featuring Dej Loaf)	Banks; Lawrence; Deja Trimble	Kid Wonder	2:33
13.	"Rich Forever" (featuring YFN Lucci)	Banks; Darrell Jackson; Darrius Luckett; Rayshawn Bennett	ChopSquad DJ	3:10
14.	"Street Life" (featuring BJ the Chicago Kid)	Banks; Staton; Bryan Sledge	Donis Beats	3:15
Total length:				43:04
