= How It Go (song) =

Single by King Von

from the album Welcome to O'Block
- Released: August 28, 2020
- Genre: Political hip hop; drill; gangsta rap
- Length: 3:52
- Label: Only the Family; Empire
- Songwriter: Dayvon Bennett
- Producer: Chopsquad DJ

King Von singles chronology
"All These Niggas" (2020)	"How It Go" (2020)	"I Am What I Am" (2020)

Music video
- "How It Go" on YouTube

"How It Go" is a song by American rapper King Von, released on August 28, 2020 as the third single from his debut studio album Welcome to O'Block (2020). On February 14, 2023, it was certified gold by Recording Industry Association of America (RIAA).

== Composition ==
In "How It Go", on the first bar, Bennett addresses the shortcomings of the justice system, plus he details what goes on behind the closed doors of a criminal trial; and still about what it means to live inside the prison, amidst news that leaks about one's woman or about dead friends, which in Bennett's personal experience led to fights with other inmates. For the chorus he resorts to a more melodious delivery than his usual, showing off the extensive arsenal of artistry he was known for; and on the second verse he tells even more stories from the streets, telling about what it is like after getting locked up, through the need to see his children or to find a job in order to be re-included in society, and it seems that all come down to the choices you make and the path you choose to take; all this through using his impressive storytelling abilities, finally ending with another hook.

On an interview for XXL, Bennett revealed to have wrote "How It Go" lyrics while he was locked up in jail. The instrumental was produced by Chopsquad DJ utilizing momentous horns, intense percussion, and speaker busting drums to create a foundation for Von, gunshots ring loud and clear, leading into the beat drop.

== Music video ==
The video was published the same day of the tune release, just few hours later, it was directed by Jerry Production. The first half of the video focuses on the negotiations between prosecutors and public defenders, with other scenes of him struggling in prison, having fights with inmates to the crushing mental pressure of solitary confinement. The other half of the video shows him finally out of prison having to deal with social pressure and the difficulty of finding a job for an ex-convict, resulting in few life choices for the person; and finally ending as Uproxx reports: " "So what you gon’ do?" Von asks in the song’s piercing second verse. "You gon’ rob or gon shoot? / You gon’ trap or gon’ crack? / You gon’ win or gon’ lose?" It appears he’s chosen to win, switching up street life for rap life, and with the assistance of Lil Durk, is well on his way to dodging his former profession forever."

The video was published on YouTube platform and reached 5.2 millions to the date of 17 September 2020.

== Certifications ==
Region	Certification	Certified units/sales
United States (RIAA)	Gold	500,000^{‡}
^{‡} Sales+streaming figures based on certification alone.
