= All These Niggas =

2020 single by King Von featuring Lil Durk

Single by King Von featuring Lil Durk

from the album Welcome to O'Block
- Released: August 5, 2020
- Genre: Hip hop; drill; gangsta rap
- Length: 2:24
- Label: Only the Family; Empire
- Songwriters: Dayvon Bennett; Durk Banks
- Producer: Chopsquad DJ

King Von singles chronology
"Why He Told" (2020)	"All These Niggas" (2020)	"How It Go" (2020)

Lil Durk singles chronology
"Gucci Gucci" (2020)	"All These Niggas" (2020)	"Painless 2" (2020)

Music video
- "All These Niggas" on YouTube

"All These Niggas" is a song by American rapper King Von featuring American rapper Lil Durk. It was released on August 5, 2020 as the second single and ninth track from Von's debut studio album Welcome to O'Block (2020). The song was produced by Chopsquad DJ.

"All These Niggas" reached the number 77 on the Billboard Hot 100 chart and number 31 on Hot R&B/Hip-Hop Songs chart still by Billboard and, on February 14, 2023 was certified platinum plaque by Recording Industry Association of America.

== Background ==
King Von and Lil Durk were labelmates and fellows, they collaborated in various songs, starting from 2019's "Crazy Story 2.0", "Twin Nem", "Like That" and "They Be Talkin'", to 2020's "Baguette's" and "Down Me". Following Von's death other featurings came out such as "Still Trappin'" from The Voice album, "Evil Twins" and "From The Hood" respectively from King Von's What It Means to Be King and Grandson albums. Lil Durk paid tribute to Von on The Voice single, "Backdoor".

== Composition ==
In the song, Von and Durk rap about the "bleak" reality of living in the streets over a drill instrumental with "eerie piano keys".

== Music video ==
A music video was released alongside the single. It was directed by JV Visuals 312, and finds King Von on his block with a white Rolls-Royce and diamond chains as he raps. Because he and Lil Durk could not legally be together, Durk did not appear in the video.

"All These Niggas" video reached 24.5 million views 2 months after its release on YouTube, according to Bennett.

== Charts ==
Chart (2020)	Peak position
US Billboard Hot 100	77
US Hot R&B/Hip-Hop Songs (Billboard)	31

== Certifications ==
Region	Certification	Certified units/sales
United States (RIAA)	Platinum	1,000,000^{‡}
^{‡} Sales+streaming figures based on certification alone.
