= Die Slow =

Die Slow may refer to:

- "Die Slow", a song by Lil Durk featuring 21 Savage from Love Songs 4 the Streets 2 (2019)
- "Die Slow", a song by Young Thug and Strick from Punk (2021)
