= Bloodas =

Mixtape by Lil Durk-Tee Grizzley (2017)

Mixtape by Lil Durk and Tee Grizzley
- Released: December 8, 2017
- Recorded: 2016–2017
- Genre: Hip hop; drill
- Length: 38:16
- Label: 300; Def Jam; Only the Family
- Producer: ATL Jacob; Beezo; Billboard Hitmakers; BLSSD; Chopsquad DJ; DY; Fuse; Inomek; Jamz; Louie Montana; Tre Pounds

Tee Grizzley chronology
My Moment (2017)	Bloodas (2017)	Activated (2018)

Lil Durk chronology
Signed to the Streets 2.5 (2017)	Bloodas (2017)	Just Cause Y'all Waited (2018)

Singles from Bloodas
- 1. "What Yo City Like" Released: December 2, 2017

Bloodas is a collaborative mixtape by American rappers Lil Durk and Tee Grizzley. It was released on December 8, 2017, by 300 Entertainment, Def Jam Recordings and Only the Family. The production on the mixtape was handled by Chopsquad DJ, Jamz, Fuse, and ATL Jacob, among others. The mixtape was supported by one single: "What Yo City Like".

== Singles ==
The album's lead single, "What Yo City Like", was released for digital download on December 2, 2017.

== Critical reception ==
Professional ratings
Review scores
Source	Rating
HipHopDX	3.3/5
Pitchfork	7.4/10

Andrew Sacher of BrooklynVegan praised the artists' styles, stating: "Their styles are noticeably different but they complement each other surprisingly well, and they work perfectly with the album's sharp production", concluding with "If these guys aren't already on your radar, Bloodas is proof that you should change that, stat." Scott Glaysher of HipHopDX wrote about the mixtape's thematic direction: "There isn't an overarching concept they're reaching for within these dozen cuts — it's simply a collection of quick and dirty gangster jams aimed to please their core audiences", concluding with "Simply put, the joint project doesn't have enough shining moments to warrant a follow-up." Evan Rytlewski of Pitchfork wrote that "Bloodas is the work of two elites who admire each other's craft, but mostly who just get a kick out of each other’s company."

== Track listing ==
Credits adapted from BMI and ASCAP.

No.	Title	Writer(s)	Producer(s)	Length
1.	"Bloodas"	Durk Banks; Terry Wallace; Darrell Jackson	Chopsquad DJ	2:40
2.	"What Yo City Like"	Banks; Wallace; Bishop Grinnage; Clifton Ball	Beezo; Louie Montana	2:52
3.	"Category Hoes"	Banks; Wallace; Jackson	Chopsquad DJ	3:25
4.	"3rd Person"	Banks; Wallace; Jackson	Chopsquad DJ	3:00
5.	"Flyers Up"	Banks; Wallace; Darling Hernandez	Jamz	4:05
6.	"Factors"	Banks; Wallace; Dwan Avery; Jacob Canady; Jeffrey LaCroix	DY; ATL Jacob; Tre Pounds	3:12
7.	"Rappers"	Banks; Wallace; Jackson	Chopsquad DJ	3:25
8.	"Ratchet Ass"	Banks; Wallace; Eduardo Burgess; Jonathan De La Rosa; Tariq Sharrieff	Billboard Hitmakers; BLSSD	3:27
9.	"Oohwee"	Banks; Wallace; Eduardo Earle Jr.	Fuse	3:37
10.	"Dirty Stick"	Banks; Wallace; Avery; LaCroix	DY; Tre Pounds	3:24
11.	"Melody"	Banks; Wallace; Canady	ATL Jacob	3:40
12.	"Ungrateful"	Banks; Wallace; Kemoni Watts	Inomek	3:29
Total length:				38:16

== Charts ==
Chart (2017)	Peak position
US Billboard 200	96
US Top R&B/Hip-Hop Albums (Billboard)	34
US Top Rap Albums (Billboard)	25
