= Levon James =

Mixtape by King Von
- Released: March 6, 2020
- Genres: Hip hop; drill
- Length: 43:27
- Labels: Only the Family; Empire
- Producers: Chopsquad DJ (exec.): EY3ZLOWBEATZ; Ant Chamberlain; Budda Beats; Blue Nightmare; Dr. Flow; Mike WiLL Made-It; Bruce "Jaggerwerks" Billingy; MVAbeats; Mike Mvjor; JAYSTONBEATS

King Von chronology
Grandson, Vol. 1 (2019)	Levon James (2020)	Welcome to O'Block (2020)

Singles from Levon James
- 1. "2 A.M." Released: November 16, 2019; 2. "Rollin" Released: November 29, 2019; 3. "Took Her to the O" Released: February 21, 2020

Levon James is the second mixtape by American rapper King Von, and the last mixtape to be released during his lifetime. It was released through Only the Family Entertainment/Empire on March 6, 2020. It is a 16-track project in an assortment of drill heavy beats executive produced by Chopsquad DJ and with various others productions from Mike WiLL Made-It, EY3ZLOWBEATZ, Ant Chamberlain, Budda Beats, Blue Nightmare, Dr. Flow, Bruce "Jaggerwerks" Billingy, MVAbeats, Mike Mvjor, JAYSTONBEATS. It has guest appearances from Lil Durk, Booka600, G Herbo, NLE Choppa, Tee Grizzley, YNW Melly, and Yungeen Ace.

The project peaked at number 40 on the Billboard 200. On December 20, 2024, the album received gold certification by the Recording Industry Association of America (RIAA).

== Release and promotion ==
King Von started his musical career in 2018, with breakout single "Crazy Story". King Von followed that up with "Crazy Story 2.0" and "Crazy Story, Pt. 3" that were included on his first mixtape Grandson, Vol. 1 which brought in large streaming numbers and resulting on him debuting at Number 53 on the Billboard 200 chart. King Von was even a supporting act on G Herbo's 2020 PTSD Tour.

In March 2020 Von was interviewed for Billboard and talked about the fact that he had to record the project in the house, having to face the penalty of house arrest at the time, he also spoke about the fact that he acquired his storytelling skills by reading many novel books in prison. The title of the album pays homage to LeBron James.

On another interview for HipHopDx, Von declared that he was pursuing the motto "Practise makes perfect" and that he was basing his works like Levon James off it. He also said that his favorite songs over the project were "Block", "Trust Issues" with Yungeen Ace, "Baguette's", "3 A.M.", "Took Her to the O", and also "Broke Opps" saying that he liked the whole project overall. He finally said that he was planning to make music for just 10 more years, and speculating that he could achieve his musical goals in 5 years as well and that after that he would have no longer gave interviews and would just have enjoyed his life.

Levon James was announced on February 26, 2020, it was supported by three singles: the first "2 A.M" released on November 16, 2019; the second one "Rollin", was released on November 29, 2019, which featured YNW Melly; the album was finally previewed with the third and last single of the project, "Took Her to the O", released on February 21, 2020, that later will become his most famous tune.

The mixtape was released on March 6, 2020.

== Singles ==
The first single "2 A.M." was released on November 16, 2019, with a music video associated released few hours later that was directed by DrewFilmedIt, that is ambiented in an airport where Von is with his friends.

The second single was "Rollin" featuring Florida artist YNW Melly, friend and etiquette colleague of Von, this also accompanied by a music video still filmed by DrewFilmedIt.

The third and last single was "Took Her to the O", a storytelling narrative based song with a very explicit and raw style where he romances a history that deals with themes of violence, crime, and street culture; the story is based on Von riding in a car with a stripper, dealing with a man named "Duck" to whom Bennett takes his revenge for throwing a brick to his car, at the end he brings the stripper to "the O", which presumably means O'Block. The song will later become his most famous tune.

== Music videos ==
The official video for "On Yo Ass" was released to coincide with the album release on March 6, 2020, and directed by CrownSoHeavy, the song is a featuring with Chicago artist G Herbo, with a hyperactive production from Chopsquad DJ. The video finds an ultra-confident Von playing a student standing up to and later haunting some oppressive jocks that are meant to be his rivals. Later was released an official video for "Trust Issues" song featuring Florida rapper Yungeen Ace, on March 20, 2020; in the song Von switched up his gangsta focus to show his softer side, and in the video his homie Yungeen Ace has sights on the same lady and may be more involved than King Von thinks; it is directed by DrewFilmedIt. A video for 3 A.M. was released a month after the album release, on April 6, 2020; the video, again directed by DrewFilmedIt, paints the scenes of Von doing a robbery at 3 a.m. against a couple including his sister. Another famous music video was that for drill song "Broke Opps", released on May 19, 2020, in it Von hosts a soiree in his native O-Block, donning a bejeweled face mask taking aim at all his "opps". The last video extracted from the project was related to "Down Me" featuring Chicago rapper Lil Durk, in which Durk did not appear, it was directed by CrownSoHeavy.

== Critical reception ==
Professional ratings
Review scores
Source	Rating
AllMusic	3.5/5 stars

Levon James received generally positive reviews. David Crone from AllMusic platform, gave the work a votation of 3.5 stars out of 5, describing it as an album with "wide-ranging appeal" valuing the opening song "Same as Us" as other songs such as "Down Me", "See Me Make It," and "Baguette's"; he also eulogizes the mixed storytelling technique and deep-rooted introspection on song "Don't Want to Be"; finally defining the overall album as: "packed with storytelling finesse, bold vocals" and also saying that Levon James is a testament to Von's potential.

== Track listing ==
Levon James track listing
No.	Title	Writer(s)	Length
1.	"Something Else"	Dayvon Bennett	2:08
2.	"Took Her to the O"	Dayvon Bennett	3:16
3.	"On Yo Ass" (featuring G Herbo)	Dayvon Bennett; Herbert Wright III	2:37
4.	"2 A.M."	Dayvon Bennett	2:00
5.	"Down Me" (featuring Lil Durk)	Dayvon Bennett; Durk Banks	2:02
6.	"Rollin" (featuring YNW Melly)	Dayvon Bennett; Jamell Demons	2:33
7.	"Same As Us"	Dayvon Bennett	1:52
8.	"Message" (featuring NLE Choppa)	Dayvon Bennett; Bryson Potts	2:58
9.	"Broke Opps"	Dayvon Bennett	2:37
10.	"Trust Issues" (featuring Yungeen Ace)	Dayvon Bennett; Keyenta Bullard	3:33
11.	"Don't Want to Be Me"	Dayvon Bennett	4:40
12.	"Block"	Dayvon Bennett	2:45
13.	"Str8" (featuring Tee Grizzley)	Dayvon Bennett; Terry Wallace Jr	3:05
14.	"3 A.M."	Dayvon Bennett	2:06
15.	"Baguette's" (featuring Booka600 and Lil Durk)	Dayvon Bennett; Booka600; Durk Banks	2:49
16.	"See Me Make It"	Dayvon Bennett	2:17
Total length:			43:27

== Charts ==
Chart performance for Levon James
Chart (2020)	Peak position
US Billboard 200	40
US Top R&B/Hip-Hop Albums (Billboard)	21
US Independent Albums (Billboard)	8

== Certifications ==
Region	Certification	Certified units/sales
United States (RIAA)	Gold	500,000^{‡}
^{‡} Sales+streaming figures based on certification alone.
