= 2 A.M. =

2 A.M. is a time on the 12-hour clock.

2 A.M. may also refer to:

== Music ==
- 2AM (band), a South Korean band
- 2AM, a 1993 album by saxophonist Theo Travis
- "2AM" (Adrian Marcel song), a 2014 song by Adrian Marcel
- "2AM" (Bear Hands song), a 2016 song by Bear Hands on the album You'll Pay For This
- "2 A.M." (King Von song), a song from the album Levon James
- "2 A.M." (Iron Maiden song), a song on the album X Factor
- "2 A.M." (Slightly Stoopid song), a song on the album Chronchitis
- "2AM", a 2021 song by Don Toliver from Life of a Don
- "2AM", a 2007 song by Hiem and Philip Oakey
- "2am", a 2021 song by Purple Kiss on the EP Hide & Seek
- 2:00 AM (album), by Raquel Sofía (2018)

== See also ==
- "TwoAM", a 2016 song by SZA on the deluxe version of the album Ctrl
- "Breathe (2 AM)", a 2004 song by Anna Nalick
- 2:00 AM Paradise Cafe, 1984 album by Barry Manilow
- 2AM (company) an American film production company
- "2:00", a Season 2 episode of Servant (TV Series)
