= Grandson, Vol. 1 =

Mixtape by King Von
- Released: September 20, 2019
- Genre: Hip hop; drill
- Length: 37:47
- Label: Only the Family; Empire
- Producer: Chopsquad DJ (exec.): Mac Fly; Murda Beatz; Kid Wond3r; Timmy Da HitMan; Young Chop; BKH Beats

King Von chronology
Grandson, Vol. 1 (2019)	Levon James (2020)

Singles from Grandson Vol. 1
- 1. "War With Us" Released: October 18, 2018; 2. "Crazy Story" Released: December 6, 2018; 3. "Crazy Story (Remix)" Released: May 3, 2019; 4. "What It's Like" Released: September 2, 2019; 5. "Crazy Story, Pt. 3" Released: September 13, 2019

Professional ratings
Review scores
Source	Rating
AllMusic	Positive

Grandson, Vol. 1 is the debut mixtape by American rapper King Von, released through Only the Family Entertainment/Empire on September 20, 2019. The album features guest appearances from Lil Durk and Booka600. Production was primarily handled by Chopsquad DJ, with additional production from Mac Fly, Murda Beatz, Kid Wond3r, Timmy Da Hitman, Young Chop, and BKH Beats. The project peaked at number 53 on the Billboard 200, supported by its 5 singles, "War With Us", "Crazy Story", "Crazy Story Remix (also referred to as Crazy Story, 2.0)", "What It's Like", and "Crazy Story, Pt. 3."

On December 20, 2024, the album received gold certification by the Recording Industry Association of America (RIAA).

== Sound and production ==
The project explores the many different sides to Von, showing that he has a more mellow and soft side compared to his famous singles. The opening track, "Went Silly", is a braggadocios rap song where Von raps about a breakup between him and another girl when Von was released from jail. Von's breakout singles, "Crazy Story" and "Crazy Story, Pt. 3", feature King Von telling a story about a robbery, while the latter features Von telling a story to a group of friends about a girl that was plotting to wipe Von out. “Twin Nem (featuring Lil Durk)" features Lil Durk and Von rapping over a serious beat produced by Murda Beatz. “No Flaws" features Von rapping over a childlike beat. "War With Us" features Von rapping over a heavy drill and bass beat. "What It's Like" features Von rapping about the legal system, and his experience of being in prison and dealing with cops. The music video features Von in prison, footage of Von's court case, and videos of a riot.

== Track listing ==
Grandson, Vol. 1 track listing
No.	Title	Length
1.	"Went Silly"	2:43
2.	"Tuff"	2:28
3.	"Crazy Story"	2:26
4.	"Crazy Story, Pt. 3"	3:11
5.	"Twin Nem" (featuring Lil Durk)	2:55
6.	"Fuck Yo Man"	3:00
7.	"No Flaws"	3:08
8.	"What It's Like"	3:10
9.	"Hoes Ain't Shit"	3:25
10.	"War with Us"	2:59
11.	"Jet" (featuring Booka600)	3:19
12.	"Mama's Boy"	1:49
13.	"Crazy Story (Remix)" (featuring Lil Durk)	3:14
Total length:		37:47

== Charts ==
Chart performance for Grandson, Vol. 1
Chart (2020)	Peak position
US Billboard 200	53
US Top R&B/Hip-Hop Albums (Billboard)	30
US Independent Albums (Billboard)	9

== Certifications ==
Certifications for Grandson, Vol. 1
Region	Certification	Certified units/sales
New Zealand (RMNZ)	Gold	7,500^{‡}
United States (RIAA)	Gold	500,000^{‡}
^{‡} Sales+streaming figures based on certification alone.
