= Henry K. Holsman =

American architect (1866–1963)

- Born: 1866
- Died: 1963 (aged 96–97)
- Occupations: architect car manufacturer
- Spouse: Elizabeth Tuttle

Henry K. Holsman (1866–1963) was an American architect and car manufacturer from Chicago, Illinois, who is mostly known for the building of Parkway Garden Homes in Chicago, Illinois. He was the founder of the Holsman Automobile Company. Holsman was married to the artist Elizabeth Tuttle Holsman (1873 – 1956).

== Buildings ==
- Henry D.L. and Jennie Adkins house (1909), 24 North Church Street, Elkhorn WI, NRHP-listed.
- Disciples Divinity House, Chicago, IL
