= Still Trappin' =

2020 song by Lil Durk and King Von

Song by Lil Durk and King Von

from the album The Voice
- Released: December 24, 2020
- Genre: Hip-hop; drill
- Length: 2:52
- Label: Only the Family; Alamo; Geffen
- Songwriters: Durk Banks; Dayvon Bennett; Kevin Price; Christian Ward; Jaucquez Lowe
- Producers: Go Grizzly; Hitmaka

Music video
- "Still Trappin'" on YouTube

Lyric video
- "Still Trappin'" on YouTube

"Still Trappin'" is a song by American rappers Lil Durk and King Von. It was released on December 24, 2020, from the former's sixth studio album, The Voice. The song marks the sixth collaboration between the artists. Deemed a "menacing", "sinister" song, it finds the rappers detailing life in gangsterism.

== Background ==
Lil Durk and King Von were labelmates and friends and had collaborated various times, ranging from 2019's "Crazy Story 2.0" and "Twin Nem", and 2020's "All These Niggas", "Baguette's" and "Down Me". Following Von's death, Lil Durk paid tribute to him on The Voice single, "Backdoor".

== Composition ==
The song finds Von performing the chorus, with the duo delivering "ruthless" verses "full of threats and boasts". lab.fm and Hypebeast both called the song "menacing", while Contactmusic.com observed it as a "sinister" song: "The stripped back song has a dark under current, scored by a bass heavy piano that soundtracks the vocal sparring".

== Critical reception ==
Hypebast's Ross Dwyer said "Standout bars include Von's witty quips about his cartel connections and Durk's darkly humorous admonition that his female friends carry tasers". Contactmusic.com wrote favorably: "The production is all the better because of what's been left out. The limited use of anything other than the vocals and the keyboards works a treat to deliver up a track that stands out from many of the others on The Voice because of its individuality. The lyrical content manifests itself perfectly through the music as the themes that Lil Durk touches on; drugs, dependency, prison and contract killing are not light or throwaway. 'Still Trappin'' has a near cinematic feel to it when heard in isolation from the rather gratuitous video." Revolt's Regina Cho noted how "Von calls out clout-chasers while Durk slides on the beat with a lyrical verse". Reviewing the song's parent album, Stereogum's Tom Breihan deemed the song a highlight: "For me, the album only really crackles with electricity on 'Still Trappin'' – the song where the late King Von shows up, and where Durk really raps rather than doing his bluesy singsong thing."

== Music video ==
The official video was directed by CrownSoHeavy and was released on January 7, 2021. The "murky, blue-tinted" visual does not feature King Von, as the video was shot after his death. Durk performs both Von's chorus and his own verses, while he and his friends party in the studio. The Fader's Jordan Darville said, "They're having fun, but you never get the sense that they're trying to avoid dealing with the tragedy that surrounds the song. Durk pays homage to Von by sporting a custom jacket with a large portrait of Von airbrushed onto the back. The video closes with the #DoIt4Von hashtag.

== Charts ==
=== Weekly charts ===
Weekly chart performance for "Still Trappin'"
Chart (2020–2021)	Peak position
Global 200 (Billboard)	93
Canada Hot 100 (Billboard)	77
New Zealand Hot Singles (RMNZ)	12
US Billboard Hot 100	53
US Hot R&B/Hip-Hop Songs (Billboard)	15
US Rolling Stone Top 100	24

=== Year-end charts ===
Year-end chart performance for "Still Trappin'"
Chart (2021)	Position
US Hot R&B/Hip-Hop Songs (Billboard)	77

== Certifications ==
Region	Certification	Certified units/sales
United States (RIAA)	2× Platinum	2,000,000^{‡}
^{‡} Sales+streaming figures based on certification alone.
