= Why He Told =

Single by King Von

from the album Welcome to O'Block
- Released: July 24, 2020
- Genre: Hip hop; drill
- Length: 3:08
- Label: Only the Family; Empire
- Songwriter: Dayvon Bennett
- Producer: Chopsquad DJ

King Von singles chronology
"Grandson For President" (2020)	"Why He Told" (2020)	"All These Niggas" (2020)

Music video
- "Why He Told" on YouTube

"Why He Told" is a song written and performed by American rapper King Von. Produced by Chopsquad DJ, it was released on July 24, 2020, as the lead single of Von's debut studio album Welcome to O'Block.

== Composition ==
Over Chopsquad DJ's emotional piano-based instrumental, the theme of the song is based on Von questioning the loyalty of a onetime friend, and reminiscing on the man himself that was a former associate who couldn't handle the pressure when the authorities arrested him and asked him questions. Von also condemn the men, sighing on the chorus, asserting that the man could’ve did the time in prison, instead of making statements to the authorities; all this delivering each line with a blend of anger, sadness, and disbelief. HipHopDX stated that the artist's pain was perceptible through the entire song.

== Music video ==
The video was directed by Joán Pabon. It opens with a female officer turning on a tape recorder, and with Bennett attending as an observer of a criminal's testimony. It features flashbacks of the informant and King Von's old friend, who at the same time imagines Von pursuing which makes him wake up in cold sweats from the guilt of betraying his friend and shows him afraid for his life.

King Von recorded a live piano session of the song in conjunction with "Took Her to the O" for Audiomack, that was released with a video on August 13, 2020, on YouTube.
