= Elizabeth Tuttle Holsman =

American painter (1873-1956)

- Born: Elizabeth Alexander Tuttle; September 25, 1873; Brownville, Nebraska, U.S.
- Died: October 4, 1956 (aged 83); Evanston, Illinois, U.S.
- Known for: Painting
- Spouse: Henry K. Holsman

Elizabeth Tuttle Holsman (1873 – 1956) was an American painter.

Holsman was born on September 25, 1873 in Brownville, Nebraska. She attended the University of Nebraska–Lincoln, and the School of the Art Institute of Chicago. In 1896 she married the architect Henry K. Holsman with whom she had two (or three) children.

Holsman died on October 4, 1956 in Evanston, Illinois.

Her work is in the collection of the Museum of Nebraska Art.
