= Gleesh Place =

Single by King Von

from the album Welcome to O'Block
- Released: October 23, 2020
- Genre: Hip hop; drill; gangsta rap
- Length: 1:34
- Label: Only the Family; Empire
- Songwriter: Dayvon Bennett
- Producer: Wheezy

King Von singles chronology
"I Am What I Am" (2020)	"Gleesh Place" (2020)	"The Code" (2020)

Music video
- "Gleesh Place" on YouTube

"Gleesh Place" is a song by American rapper King Von. It was released on October 23, 2020, as the fifth single from Von's debut studio album Welcome to O'Block released the subsequent October 30, 2020. The song represents the number eight on the album tracklist.

"Gleesh" on the song name is in reference to his friend from O'Block, Gleesh, whose "place" is a scene referenced in the story.

== Composition ==
The first few bars are part of the first hook and are simplistic statements highlighting some of the hardcore and ruthless crimes that occur on O-Block, the neighborhood that he, as well as Chief Keef, are from. As he makes his way through the verse, his enthusiasm and passion continuously elevate and Bennett begins to get into an actual story about one of the heists he pulled off, in fact starting off at the event where he robbed someone, quickly making his way back to his companion Gleesh's apartment, where the duo quickly realize he had stolen approximately fifty thousand dollars, immediately fantasizing about all the things they will purchase with their newfound wealth. Von wishes to purchase a car, to which Gleesh responds “Get it straight” Von then expresses his wish to purchase firearms, to which Gleesh responds, “Get a crate”. All this is indicated by the lines: "I'm posted in Parkway, fuck what the narcs say," "Just hit a quick stain, now I'm runnin' through gang ways / Jump the tall gate, hit a hallway / Ran to the fifth floor, now I'm at Gleesh place." Their celebration is cut short as the police bust down the door, sending him into yet another hook. With the song Bennett revealed the fact that all that he said in his songs are real-life things that occur in his day to day existence and not things that he flaunts to impress the listener.

The Instrumental was produced by Wheezy, and it is characterized by momentous synths which start out soft with a low volume as it builds into an epic basis for Von to go off the rails and unleash his narrative. When he does come in, additional synths, percussions, and clean 808s also enter into the picture with him.

== Music video ==
The official music video, filmed at O-Block itself, was released the same day and it was directed by frequent collaborator Jerry Productions. When the song begins and Von sings the hook, he dons his diamond-studded chain and designer clothing as he is surrounded by his crew who are all smoking and bouncing around to the record. Getting into his verse, he reenacts the robbery or “lick”, he had done, reaching into a man’s car, taking a bag, and running away. As he runs down a sidewalk, he reaches a door which he enters and leaps up the steps of this building, eventually arriving at Gleesh's (Asa Asunción) residence. He then empties the bag onto the couch, revealing the money and reenacting the celebration that he and his friend had. Nearly no time passes before two officers bust in through the front door, sending the two individuals running out the back in different directions. The cops seem to be confused, one taking the stairs up while the other takes them down on the hunt for Von and Gleesh. The video comes to an end before any sort of resolution occurs.

== Critical reception ==
Danny Adams viewed King Von's music, such as "Gleesh Place," as evidence of his potential as a writer, praising his ability to tell captivating and authentic stories, mirroring his often aggressive and intense public persona. He also eulogized King Von as the best storyteller ever out of the Chicago drill scene.
