= Loyal Bros =

Compilation album by Only the Family
- Released: March 5, 2021
- Genre: Drill
- Length: 52:33
- Labels: Only the Family; Empire
- Producers: AK; Ashlxy Felix; ATL Jacob; AyeTM; Chopsquad DJ; Deltah Beats; DJ Kidd; JD On Tha Track; Jenu McLucas; Koncept P; Nick Slowburnz; Nile Waves; Perrytrills; Rwal Reech; TM88; TooDope; Touch of Trent

Only the Family chronology
Family over Everything (2019)	Loyal Bros (2021)	Loyal Bros 2 (2022)

Singles from Loyal Bros
- 1. "Me and Doodie Lo" Released: August 21, 2020; 2. "Streets Raised Me" Released: November 27, 2020; 3. "Pull Up" Released: January 15, 2021; 4. "Rules" Released: February 5, 2021; 5. "Pistol Tottin" Released: February 19, 2021; 6. "Jump" Released: March 3, 2021

Loyal Bros (officially titled Only the Family – Lil Durk Presents: Loyal Bros) is a compilation album by American record label and hip-hop group Only the Family. It was released on March 5, 2021, through the label alongside Empire Distribution. The album contains guest appearances from Lil Durk, late rapper King Von, Booka600, Memo600, Doodie Lo, late rapper THF Zoo, Lil Uzi Vert, Chief Wuk, Tee Grizzley, Big30, EST Gee, OTF Timo, Boss Top, C3, Slimelife Shawty, Jusblow600, Lil Mexico, Foogiano, OTF Ikey, Hypno Carlito, Boonie Moe, and Boona. It serves as the fourth compilation album by the label, following the 2019 compilation album, Family over Everything, a collaborative project with Durk. A sequel was released in collaboration with Durk on December 16, 2022.

== Background ==
The album serves as the first project/compilation album by the record label to be released after one of its artists, American rapper King Von died from a shootout outside a nightclub in Atlanta, Georgia,

I am you . 2020. It is dedicated to him and is not the first time that Lil Durk has dedicated music to the late rapper, as some works include his sixth studio album, The Voice (2020), along with all the songs on the album, specifically the sixth track and their first posthumous collaboration, "Still Trappin'".

== Release and promotion ==
On February 6, 2021, it was claimed that the album would reportedly be released on February 26, 2021. However, this was not the case, as Only the Family revealed its cover art on the rumored release date. On March 2, 2021, the label revealed the blurred track listing along with the announcement of the release of "Jump", performed by Lil Durk, King Von, and Booka600, featuring Memo600. The clear and official track listing was finally revealed the day before the album was released, March 4, 2021.

== Singles ==
The album's lead single, "Me and Doodie Lo", with Doodie Lo and King Von, was released on August 21, 2020. The second single, "Streets Raised Me", with Doodie Lo and Booka600, was released on Black Friday, November 27, 2020. "Pull Up", with Doodie Lo and American rapper Timo, featuring American rapper C3 was released as the third single on January 15, 2021. Following it, the fourth single, "Rules", with Timo, was released on February 5, 2021. "Pistol Tottin", with American rapper Memo600, featuring American rapper Foogiano, was released as the sixth single on February 19, 2021. Finally, "Jump", performed by Lil Durk, King Von, and Booka600, featuring Memo600, was released as the sixth and final single on March 3, 2021.

== Commercial performance ==
Loyal Bros debuted at number 12 on the US Billboard 200 chart, earning 28,000 album-equivalent units (including 2,000 copies in pure album sales) in its first week. The album also accumulated a total of 33.2 million on-demand streams of the album's songs.

== Track listing ==
Credits adapted from Tidal.

Loyal Bros standard track listing
No.	Title	Writer(s)	Producer(s)	Length
1.	"Jump" (performed by Lil Durk, King Von, and Booka600 featuring Memo600)	Durk Banks; Dayvon Bennett; Darontez Mayo; Melvin Griffin; Jenu McLucas	RMG Nu	3:13
2.	"Sip Again" (with Lil Durk and Doodie Lo featuring THF Zoo)	Banks; David Saulsberry; Devonshe Collier; Rwal Reech	Reech	1:59
3.	"Let It Blow" (with Memo600 featuring Lil Uzi Vert)	Griffin; Symere Woods; Vincent Boyles, Jr.	Deltah Beats	2:57
4.	"Hellcats & Trackhawks" (with Lil Durk)	Banks; Nicholas Slowburn	Nick Slowburnz	2:26
5.	"Turkey Season" (with Lil Durk and Chief Wuk)	Banks; Vontrell Voker; Bryan Simmons; Jacob Canady; Lesidney Ragland	TM88; ATL Jacob; Too Dope	1:48
6.	"Chess" (with Tee Grizzley)	Terry Wallace; Marcus Rucker	Motif Alumni	2:40
7.	"Took Down" (with Doodie Lo featuring Big30)	Saulsberry; Rodney Wright, Jr.; Ayojarii	Ayojarii	2:13
8.	"Out the Roof" (performed by Lil Durk, King Von, and Booka600)	Banks; Bennett; Mayo; Trenton Turner; Joel Abraham; Cai Lange	Touch of Trent; Jo L'z; Odyssee	2:15
9.	"Me and Doodie Lo" (performed by Doodie Lo and King Von)	Saulsberry; Bennett; Thomas Moore	AyeTM	2:33
10.	"Game Face" (with Booka600 and Tee Grizzley)	Mayo; Wallace; Christopher Pearson; Jorres Nelson; Javar Rockamore; Theodore Thomas; Robert Reese	YC; Real Red; Javar Rockamore; Stonii; Bobby "Keyz" Reese	1:55
11.	"I Ain't Lying" (with Chief Wuk featuring EST Gee)	Voker; George Stone III; Austin Kassabian	AK	2:48
12.	"Pull Up" (with Doodie Lo and Timo featuring C3)	Saulsberry; Timo; Charles Laster III; ProdbyZeke	ProdbyZeke	2:46
13.	"Do It for Von" (performed by Booka600, Memo600 and THF Zoo)	Mayo; Griffin; Collier; Craig West	Big Savage	2:31
14.	"Dying 2 Hit'em" (with Lil Durk and Slimelife Shawty)	Banks; Wunnie Lee		2:27
15.	"Toxic" (with Jusblow600)	Justin Mitchell; João Duarte; Timothy Gomringer; Kevin Gomringer	JD on tha Track; Cubeatz	2:30
16.	"Glaciers" (with Booka600 and Boss Top)	Mayo; Tyree Davis; Darrell Jackson	Chopsquad DJ	3:12
17.	"Kennedy" (with Lil Mexico)	Lafazio Jones; Nile Bey; Perrytrills	Nile Waves; Perrytrills	1:59
18.	"Streets Raised Me" (with Doodie Lo and Booka600)	Saulsberry; Mayo; Ashley Felix	Ashlxy Felix	3:12
19.	"Rules" (with Timo)	Timo; DJ Kidd; Edis Selmani	DJ Kidd; Yung Dza	1:47
20.	"Pistol Tottin" (with Memo600 featuring Foogiano)	Griffin; Kwame Brown; Paul Penso	Koncept P; YBP	2:29
21.	"Young Rich Niggaz" (performed by Ikey and Hypno Carlito)	Michael Harris; Robert Amparan; OhZone	OhZone	2:35
22.	"Get Backers" (with THF Zoo and Boonie Mo featuring Boona)	Collier; Antonio Jones; Boona; Prod By Master	Prod By Master	2:49
23.	"Apart" (performed by Booka600)	Mayo; Moore	AyeTM	2:50
Total length:				52:33

== Personnel ==
Credits adapted from Tidal.

- Only the Family – primary artist (all tracks)
- Lil Durk – primary artist (tracks 1, 2, 4, 5, 8, 14)
- King Von – primary artist (tracks 1, 8, 9)
- Booka600 – primary artist (tracks 1, 8, 10, 13, 16, 18, 23)
- Memo600 – featured artist (track 1), primary artist (tracks 3, 13, 20)
- Doodie Lo – featured artist (tracks 2, 7, 9, 12, 18)
- Thf Zoo – featured artist (track 2), primary artist (tracks 13, 20)
- Lil Uzi Vert – featured artist (track 3)
- Chief Wuk – primary artist (tracks 5, 11)
- Tee Grizzley – primary artist (tracks 6, 10)
- Big30 – featured artist (track 7)
- EST Gee – featured artist (track 11)
- Timo – primary artist (tracks 12, 19)
- C3 – featured artist (track 12)
- Slimelife Shawty – primary artist (track 14)
- Jusblow600 – primary artist (track 15)
- Boss Top – primary artist (track 16)
- Lil Mexico – primary artist (track 17)
- Foogiano – featured artist (track 20)
- Ikey – primary artist (track 21)
- Hypno Carlito – primary artist (track 21)
- Boonie Mo – primary artist (track 22)
- Boona – featured artist (track 22)

== Charts ==
=== Weekly charts ===
Weekly chart performance for Loyal Bros
Chart (2021)	Peak position
Canadian Albums (Billboard)	54
US Billboard 200	12
US Top R&B/Hip-Hop Albums (Billboard)	6

=== Year-end charts ===
Year-end chart performance for Loyal Bros
Chart (2021)	Position
US Top R&B/Hip-Hop Albums (Billboard)	86

== Release history ==
Release history for Loyal Bros
Region	Date	Format(s)	Label	Ref.
Various	March 5, 2021	Digital download; streaming	Only the Family; Empire	
