= OTF =

OTF may refer to:

== Science and technology ==
- OTF knife, or sliding knife, a type of pocketknife
- OpenType, a standard for digital typography (file extension .otf)
- Optical transfer function, a metric for evaluating optical systems
- Triflate, in organic chemistry, a functional group represented by the symbol -OTf
- Off-the-film metering, in camera metering systems, a type of through-the-lens metering

== Other uses ==
- Order of the Falcon, order of chivalry in Iceland
- Obstructing the field, an infringement in cricket
- Only the Family, an American hip-hop collective and the associated record label, OTF
- Ontario Teachers' Federation, Canada
- Open Technology Fund, an American nonprofit corporation
