= Chris Devins =

American painter

Chris Devins is an artist/urban planner from Chicago, Illinois who engages in placemaking, which blends Art and Urban Planning. He is the creator of several outdoor Art initiatives in the Chicago area, including Hyde Park Heroes, the Pullman Project, Chatham 2.0, and Bronzeville Legends.

In April 2017, Devins admitted to using an image created by Rhode Island art student Gelila Mesfin for a mural of former first lady Michelle Obama. Devins raised $12,000 through a GoFundMe campaign for the creation of the mural, triggering much negative media coverage.

In 2021, Devins painted the King Von mural near 65th and King Drive in Chicago.
