= Love Songs 4 the Streets 2 =

Studio album by Lil Durk (2019)

Studio album by Lil Durk
- Released: August 2, 2019
- Genre: Hip hop; drill
- Length: 47:35
- Label: Only the Family; Alamo; Interscope
- Producer: Chopsquad DJ; DY; Big A; Bobby Raps; Boi-1da; Bum; Charlie Handsome; Einer Bankz; Geraldo Liive; Go Grizzly; Hood Famous; Jahaan Sweet; Jahlil Beats; Julian Cruz; KidWond3r; SKUFL; Skylronthebeat; Sonic; The Beat Bully; TurnMeUpJosh; Will A Fool; Zar

Lil Durk chronology
Signed to the Streets 3 (2018)	Love Songs 4 the Streets 2 (2019)	Family over Everything (2019)

Singles from Love Songs 4 The Streets 2
- 1. "Like That" Released: July 9, 2019; 2. "Bougie" Released: July 19, 2019; 3. "Green Light" Released: July 26, 2019; 4. "Extravagant" Released: August 2, 2019

Love Songs 4 the Streets 2 is the fourth studio album by American rapper Lil Durk. It was released on August 2, 2019, by Only the Family, Alamo Records and Interscope Records. It serves as a sequel to his commercial mixtape, Love Songs for the Streets (2017). The album features guest appearances from King Von, 21 Savage, A Boogie wit da Hoodie, Nicki Minaj, Meek Mill, and Key Glock. It peaked at number four on the Billboard 200 in the United States.

== Critical reception ==
Professional ratings
Aggregate scores
Source	Rating
Metacritic	73/100
Review scores
Source	Rating
AllMusic	3.5/5 stars
HipHopDX	3.5/5
Pitchfork	6.9/10
RapReviews	7.5/10

Love Songs 4 the Streets 2 was met with generally positive reviews. At Metacritic, the album received an average score of 73 out of 100, based on four reviews.

AllMusic's critic Fred Thomas gave the album a positive review, praising Durk's flows change up between the mixtape's best material. Thomas further says that "The 16 songs use a wide variety of stylistic approaches while centering around Durk's lyrical narratives of desperation and survival. While not all of it feels essential, the high points are fantastic examples of the rapper at his best." Pitchfork's critic Dean Van Nguyen had positive opinions regarding the album, saying that "Lil Durk's music offers a sobering depiction of life outside of rap myths. He writes like someone keeping his head above water, hustling paycheck to paycheck, with dwindling hopes that a career in music will provide all promised riches." He implied that Durk's songwriting and lyricism has improved, also stating that "culling these missteps would have helped the tape's batting average, but they can't mask Durk's undeniable strengths".

== Commercial performance ==
Love Songs 4 the Streets 2 debuted at number four on the US Billboard 200, earning 44,000 album-equivalent units (with 4,000 copies in pure album sales) in its first week. This became Lil Durk's first US top-five album. The 16-track project also accumulated a total of 52.7 million on-demand audio streams that week.

== Track listing ==
No.	Title	Writer(s)	Producer(s)	Length
1.	"RN4L"	Durk Banks; Darrell Gregory Jackson	Chopsquad DJ	3:17
2.	"Like That" (featuring King Von)	Banks; Dayvon Bennett; Dwan Avery	DY	2:46
3.	"Green Light"	Banks; Avery; Anthony Beechan	DY; KidWond3r	2:24
4.	"Die Slow" (featuring 21 Savage)	Banks; Shéyaa Bin Abraham-Joseph; Jackson	Chopsquad DJ	3:20
5.	"Locked Up"	Banks; Adrian Appleby; Clarence Lazar Gray; Harrison Lipsitz	Big A; Skylronthebeat; Zar	2:55
6.	"Rebellious"	Banks; Joshua Samuel; Kevin Andre Price; Nicodemo Lalli	Go Grizzly; Hood Famous; TurnMeUpJosh	3:02
7.	"U Said" (featuring A Boogie wit da Hoodie)	Banks; Artist Julius Dubose; Jahaan Sweet; Matthew Samuels; Ryan Vojtesak	Boi-1da; Charlie Handsome; Jahaan Sweet	2:48
8.	"Prada You"	Banks; Avery; Robert Richardson	DY; Bobby Raps	2:38
9.	"Extravagant" (featuring Nicki Minaj)	Banks; Onika Maraj; Jose Julian De La Cruz; Widnick Prevalon	Julian Cruz; SKUFL	4:45
10.	"Bora Bora"	Banks; Jackson	Chopsquad DJ	2:42
11.	"Weirdo Hoes"	Banks; Gerardo Mejia	Geraldo Liive	3:21
12.	"TherlBread"	Banks; Willie Jerome Byrd	Will A Fool	2:48
13.	"Bougie" (featuring Meek Mill)	Banks; Robert Rihmeek Williams; Anthony Tucker; Orlando J. Tucker	Jahlil Beats; The Beat Bully	3:01
14.	"Wooh" (featuring Key Glock)	Banks; Markeyvius Cathey; Mario Martinez; Avery	DY; Bum	2:16
15.	"David Ruffin"	Banks; Spencer Harris; Eric Sandoval	Einer Bankz; Sonic	2:40
16.	"Love Songs 4 the Streets"	Banks; Jackson; Lionel Richie	Chopsquad DJ	3:08
Total length:				47:35

== Charts ==
=== Weekly charts ===
Chart (2019)	Peak position
Canadian Albums (Billboard)	25
Dutch Albums (Album Top 100)	46
UK Albums (OCC)	39
US Billboard 200	4
US Top R&B/Hip-Hop Albums (Billboard)	2
US Top Rap Albums (Billboard)	2

=== Year-end charts ===
Chart (2019)	Position
US Top R&B/Hip-Hop Albums (Billboard)	82

== Certifications ==
Region	Certification	Certified units/sales
United States (RIAA)	Gold	500,000^{‡}
^{‡} Sales+streaming figures based on certification alone.
