= The Code (King Von song) =

2020 song by King Von

Single by King Von featuring Polo G

from the album Welcome to O'Block
- Released: October 30, 2020
- Genre: Gangsta rap; drill
- Length: 3:22
- Label: Only the Family; Empire
- Songwriters: Dayvon Bennett; Taurus Bartlett
- Producers: DJ Ayo; JTK; LC

King Von singles chronology
| "Gleesh Place" (2020) | "The Code" (2020) | "Lurkin" (2020) |

Polo G singles chronology
| "Bop It" (2020) | "The Code" (2020) | "Lurkin" (2020) |

Music video
- "The Code" on YouTube

"The Code" is a song by American rapper King Von, released on October 30, 2020 with an accompanying music video. It is the sixth single from his debut studio album Welcome to O'Block (2020) and features vocals from American rapper Polo G.

== Composition ==
The song features a "sinister piano loop" in its instrumental. Von and Polo rap about sticking to the code of the streets by not being an informant.

== Music video ==
The music video was directed by DrewFilmedIt and Jon Primo. It was released on Von’s YouTube channel on October 30, 2020. In it, the rappers trap their enemies using a computer program and torture them with the help of a "scantily clad assistant."

== Charts ==
| Chart (2020) | Peak position |
|---|---|
| Canada Hot 100 (Billboard) | 90 |
| Global 200 (Billboard) | 121 |
| US Billboard Hot 100 | 66 |
| US Hot R&B/Hip-Hop Songs (Billboard) | 22 |

== Certifications ==
| Region | Certification | Certified units/sales |
|---|---|---|
| United States (RIAA) | Platinum | 1,000,000^{‡} |
^{‡} Sales+streaming figures based on certification alone.
