= Took Her to the O =

2020 single by King Von

Single by King Von

from the album Levon James
- Released: February 21, 2020
- Genre: Hip hop; drill
- Length: 3:14
- Label: Only the Family; Empire
- Songwriters: Dayvon Bennett; Darrel Jackson
- Producer: Chopsquad DJ

King Von singles chronology
"Pressin" (2020)	"Took Her to the O" (2020)	"Grandson For President" (2020)

Music video
- "Took Her to the O" on YouTube

"Took Her to the O" is a song by American rapper King Von released on February 21, 2020, through labels Only the Family and Empire. It served as the third and last single extracted from his second commercial mixtape, Levon James, which was released in March 2020. The track was written by Von and Chopsquad DJ, with the latter handling production. Classified within the drill genre, it is also among Bennett's most popular songs. It received positive reviews from music critics, who praised the vivid storytelling, sharp lyrical detail, and immersive narrative.

The song peaked at number 47 on the Billboard Hot 100. On February 14, 2023, it was certified triple platinum by the Recording Industry Association of America (RIAA) for surpassing three million certified units sold in the United States. Additionally, on August 1, 2025, it received a gold certification from the British Phonographic Industry (BPI) for exceeding 400,000 sales in the United Kingdom.

"Took Her to the O" is one of King Von's favorite among all the songs of the project Levon James. In an interview for XXL MAG, King Von revealed that he wrote most of the song’s lyrics while he was in jail.

== Composition ==
The song finds Bennett rapping with aggressive energy and hard-hitting flows and a catchy hook, over a "sinister, piano-led drill beat".

"Took Her to the O" was described as a dark and intense song that vividly portrays the harsh realities of life on the streets. The song's lyrics were defined as both graphic and disturbing, painting a bleak picture of a world where violence and aggression are a necessary part of survival. It deals with themes of violence, crime, and street culture, portraying King Von as a tough and ruthless character who is willing to take matters into his own hands in order to protect himself.

In the video Von's character rides in a car and seduces "a stripper" from Kankakee that he met "at the store". The seduction goes wrong as Von's character is confronted by a man named "Duck", leading the situation to become violent, with the man throwing a brick at Von's car. Von's character reacts by shooting him twice, killing him. The man is heavily implied to be the rapper FBG Duck. Duck died after being shot months after the song's release. The story ends with Von taking the girl to "the O", that isParkway Garden Homes, also known as "O'Block", an apartment complex in Chicago on the 6400 block of South King Drive, where Bennett grew up.

King Von also employs a line that recalls his catchphrase "We not from 63rd" which he introduced in his breakout single Crazy Story. In "Took Her to the O" he adapted it to the story with the following verse "I know you mad 'cause I smoked your mans, left him on the curb/She started laughin', she said, "Fuck that nigga, he from 63rd."

King Von explained in detail his lyrics on "Took Her to the O" song, appearing on March 21, 2020, in a YouTube video for Genius.

== Music video ==
The music video was released alongside the single on February 21, 2020. It was directed by Joan Pabon in collaboration with Blanksquare Productions for shooting the interior scenes, that were filmed in Los Angeles at "FilmstudioLA". In it, King Von recounts the story to his therapist through rapping the song, between shots of Von and his dancing, intercut with scenes from the narrative.

King Von also recorded a live piano session of the song concurrently with "Why He Told" song for Audiomack, that was released with a video on August 13, 2020, on YouTube.

== Critical reception ==
Mark Braboy that wrote for Complex, defined songs like "Took Her to the O" and the "Crazy Story" series as pieces that brought back catchy narrative sing-alongs, reminiscent of what Slick Rick did with "Children's Story"; plus he defined King Von as thoughtful, skillful lyricist, and different from others Chicago drill artists as able to deliver it in a ferocious and resonating package that was unrivaled. Will Schube of NPR noted that King Von's artistry is marked by his ability to craft vivid narratives, blending a stark, dead-eye nihilism with humor and empathy in his rhymes; and that this distinctive style is exemplified right in "Took Her to the O".

== Charts ==
=== Weekly charts ===
Weekly chart performance for "Took Her to the O"
Chart (2020)	Peak position
Canada Hot 100 (Billboard)	56
Global 200 (Billboard)	94
New Zealand Hot Singles (RMNZ)	18
US Billboard Hot 100	47
US Hot R&B/Hip-Hop Songs (Billboard)	14

=== Year-end charts ===
Year-end chart performance for "Took Her to the O"
Chart (2021)	Position
US Hot R&B/Hip-Hop Songs (Billboard)	64

== Certifications ==
Certifications for "Took Her to the O"
Region	Certification	Certified units/sales
Denmark (IFPI Danmark)	Gold	45,000^{‡}
New Zealand (RMNZ)	Platinum	30,000^{‡}
United Kingdom (BPI)	Gold	400,000^{‡}
United States (RIAA)	3× Platinum	3,000,000^{‡}
^{‡} Sales+streaming figures based on certification alone.
