= Parkway Garden Homes =

Apartment building complex in Chicago, Illinois, US

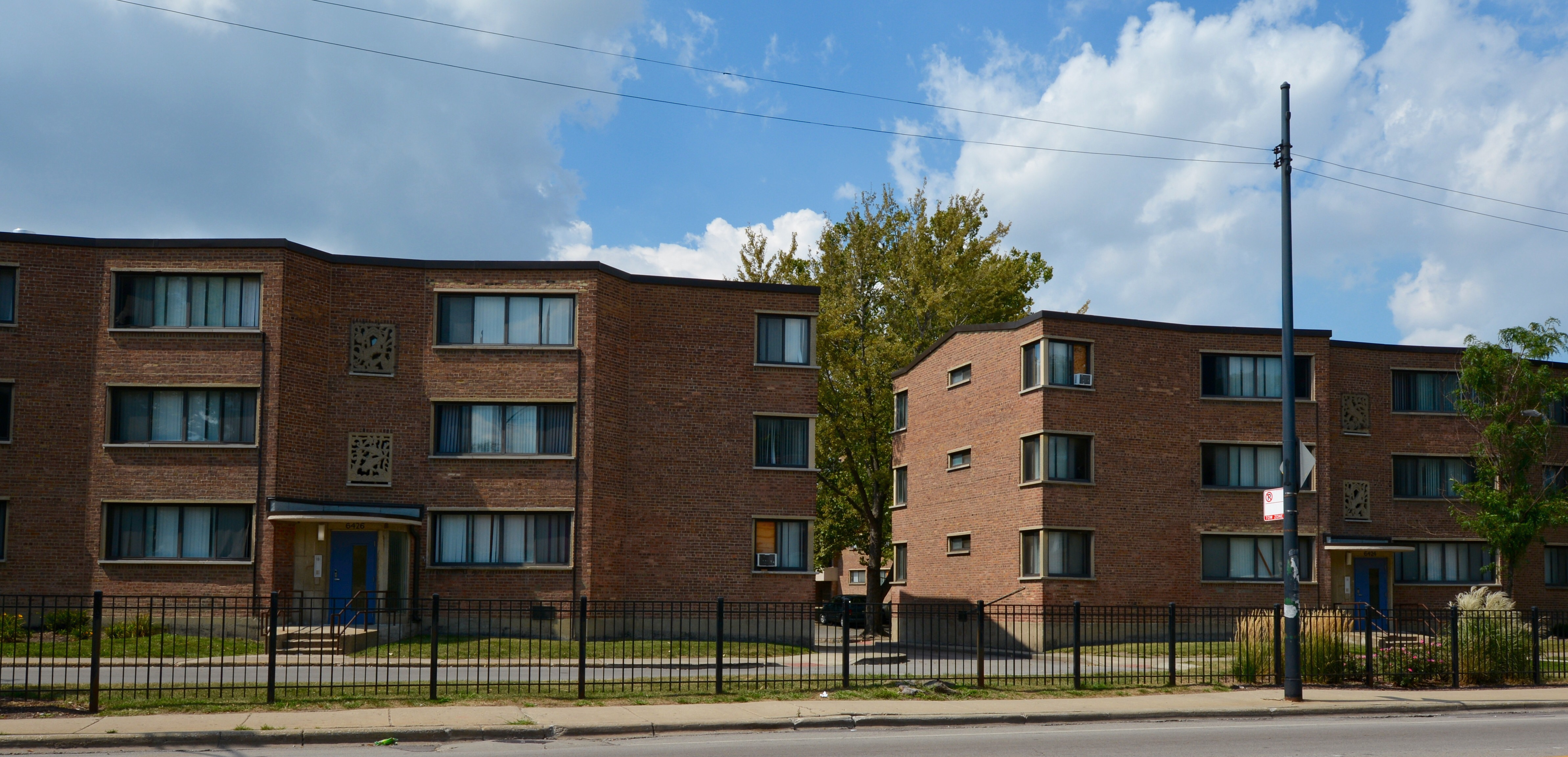
- Parkway Garden Homes in 2015
- Alternative names: O'Block, O Block

General information
- Architectural style: Modern architecture
- Location: 6330-6546 South King Drive, Chicago, Illinois
- Coordinates: 41°46′36″N 87°36′59″W
- Construction started: 1950; 76 years ago
- Completed: 1955; 71 years ago
- Renovated: September 2013
- Owner: Related Companies

Technical details
- Floor area: <1 acre (0.40 ha)

Design and construction
- Architect: Henry K. Holsman

Other information
- Public transit: Green (King Drive)

Website
- parkwaygardenschicago.com
- Parkway Garden Apartment Homes
- U.S. National Register of Historic Places
- U.S. Historic district
- NRHP reference No.: 11000848
- Added to NRHP: November 22, 2011

Parkway Gardens Apartment Homes, commonly also known as O Block, is a gated private apartment complex in the Greater Grand Crossing community area on the border of Woodlawn and Washington Park, on the South Side of Chicago, Illinois. The complex was built from 1950 to 1955. Architect Henry K. Holsman, who planned several of Chicago's affordable housing developments, designed the Modernist buildings. Parkway Gardens has been home to several rappers associated with the Chicago drill scene, including Chief Keef and King Von.

== History ==
=== Background ===
Parkway Gardens Apartment Homes, built from 1950 to 1955, was the last of Henry K. Holsman's housing development projects in Chicago. In the 1910s, when an urban housing shortage developed after World War I, Holsman worked on several of the Chicago Housing Authority's major low-income housing projects. Later in the decade, he received funding from the Federal Housing Authority. From the 1940s onward, Holsman focused on designing residences for Chicago's Black citizens, such as his Princeton Park community.

=== Construction ===
While the city's Black population boomed from 1920 to 1970, due to the Great Migration, discriminatory housing policies forced them to live in the "Black Belt" section of the South Side, which did not have enough housing to meet demand. After completing the Winchester-Hood and Lunt-Lake Apartments on the North Side, Holsman began work on the similarly designed Parkway Gardens as a return to the South Side African-American community. The complex replaced the White City Amusement Park, which had operated at the site since 1905. Holsman's firm went bankrupt before the complex opened, due to unsound financial decisions, one of which resulted in Holsman's conviction for mail fraud.

The complex was the first cooperatively owned Black housing development in the United States. While Holsman had worked on cooperative housing in the past, its adoption by Black Americans was considered a major success for the community. Mary McLeod Bethune gave an address at the development's cornerstone-laying ceremony, which was attended by governor Adlai Stevenson II, Chicago mayor Martin H. Kennelly, and both of the state's U.S. Senators. Advocates for affordable housing and civil rights praised the development when it was completed, citing its modern heating and appliances and its expansive units. Early residents of the complex included former First Lady Michelle Obama as well as rappers Chief Keef, King Von, and Fredo Santana.

=== Ownership change and deterioration ===
Parkway Gardens shifted from cooperative ownership to the United States Department of Housing and Urban Development management in the 1970s and to private ownership in the 1980s. Following this, the property deteriorated due to a lack of investment in modernization and maintenance.

From the late 2000s to the early 2010s, the complex was the center of gang shootings, mostly among teenagers and young adults. Tenants and community leaders contended that the crime wave came after the Chicago Housing Authority demolished the drug-infested Randolph Tower, nicknamed the "Calumet Building", which was once located at 6217 S. Calumet Ave. The 16-story red-brick project building was the base of operations for the Black Disciples gang. A 2004 Chicago Tribune article stated that drug dealers in the Randolph Tower were hauling in drug profits as high as $300,000 per day. After the demolition in 2006, Black Disciples shifted their operations to Parkway Gardens, which had become Gangster Disciples territory. Even though the area was rife with crime, Parkway was described as a "safe environment" until gang members from various highrise housing projects across the South Side moved in during the end of the 2000s.

In the early 2010s, gang activity skyrocketed, and Parkway became the center of one of Chicago's most violent neighborhoods. The 6400 block of South King Drive was known locally as "WIIIC CITY" but began to be referred to as "O'Block" following the 2011 murder of resident and Black Disciples member Odee Perry. Under this new name, it became nationally notorious due to former residents Chief Keef, King Von, Fredo Santana, and Lil Durk, whose music often references Parkway Gardens and its violence. Between June 2011 and June 2014, Parkway Gardens had the most shootings of any neighborhood in Chicago, mostly stemming from gang rivalries between the Gangster Disciples and Black Disciples, who both control territory near the block. Chicago police have reported that violence at the complex has since steadily declined.

=== Renovation ===
Parkway Gardens was added to the National Register of Historic Places on November 22, 2011, for its architectural significance and its role in African-American community development.

The Chicago affiliate of the national real estate firm Related Companies and a major affordable housing and mixed-use developer known for its expertise in preservation projects purchased Parkway Gardens in 2011. The company completed a significant renovation of the property in September 2013 and thus preserved an affordable place for 2,000 people to live. The renovation received the 2014 Chicago Neighborhood Development Award for Outstanding For-Profit Neighborhood Real Estate Project from the Local Initiatives Support Corporation Chicago.

== Architecture ==
Holsman gave the Parkway Gardens Apartment Homes a Modernist design inspired by European housing projects of the 1920s and 1930s. The complex is low-rise and includes several walk-up buildings. Thirty-five buildings are included in the complex; twenty-four of these are walk-ups, while the remaining eleven are eight-story buildings. The development's layout emphasized spaciousness, light, and airflow, and pointed entrances toward the inside of the complex rather than the street. Instead of ornamentation, angled bays gave variety to the exteriors, a feature inspired by German "zig-zag houses". The few decorative elements, which include cantilevered balconies and ribbon windows, are typical of Modernist buildings.

== In popular culture ==
Former resident and rapper King Von's debut studio album was titled Welcome to O'Block, and a single featured on his 2020 mixtape, Levon James, is titled "Took Her to the O", a reference to the homes.

== Notable residents ==
- King Von, rapper and songwriter
- Chief Keef, rapper and record producer
- Fredo Santana, rapper and songwriter
- Lil Durk, rapper and songwriter
- Michelle Obama, attorney, author, and First Lady of the United States from 2009 to 2017
