= Lurkin (Funk Flex and King Von song) =

Single by King Von and Funkmaster Flex
- Released: October 22, 2020
- Genre: Drill; gangsta rap
- Length: 1:40; 2:28 (Remix)
- Label: Loud; RCA; BMG; Def Jam; Island; Universal; E1; Koch; Franchise Records
- Songwriters: Dayvon Bennett; Aston Taylor Jr.
- Producers: BMC Beats, Grant Gardner, Funkmaster Flex

King Von singles chronology
"The Code" (2020)	"Lurkin" (2020)	"Rose Gold" (2021)

Music video
- "Lurkin" on YouTube
- "Lurkin 2.0" on YouTube

Lurkin 2.0
- Cover art of "Lurkin 2.0" featuring Polo G.

"Lurkin" is a song by American rapper King Von and American DJ and rapper Funkmaster Flex. It was released on October 22, 2020, as a collaborative single. On July 16, 2021, a remix for the song was released and it featured Chicago rapper Polo G, the remix was entitled "Lurkin 2.0".

== Composition ==
The song was initially intended to be part of Funkmaster Flex's debut project, which was set to include various collaborations with different hip hop artists. However, the project was never released. This song became the first track to be released from that intended collection.

"Lurkin" represents one of the first posthumous records released from the late King Von, and it was unveiled by Funk Flex. The track, which spans just under two minutes, showcases Von's gritty storytelling over a beat produced by BMC Beats, Grant Gardner, and Funk Flex. In an interview with HotNewHipHop's Aron A., Taylor explained that Bennett initially wasn't a fan of the instrumental, but that despite his initial reluctance, Taylor convinced him to trust his vision. Their first face-to-face meeting occurred in New York after previously communicating via FaceTime. Taylor noted that Bennett had a strong interest in cars, which helped them connect during their meeting. The track delves into King Von's experiences with street life in Chicago.

== Music video ==
The music video for "Lurkin", was directed by Juganot, the video showcases King Von and Funk Flex on a New York City street enveloped in colored smoke, adding as visual elements exotic cars in a dramatic and urban gritty street setting, emphasizing the raw and authentic nature of the song. Filmed just two days before Bennett's passing, the video was part of a project that began with Taylor reaching out to Bennett via direct message. Following their initial communication, he completed the track within a few weeks. The video shoot was organized around King Von's visit to New York, but his passing occurred shortly after the shoot. Flex has chosen not to release an additional interview footage from that day.

== Remix ==
On July 15, 2021, Funk Flex decided to enhance the track with a remix of the original song, by bringing in Polo G, another, at the time, rising rapper from Chicago. In this remix, named also "Lurkin 2.0", Polo G brings an energy characterized by dark, violent lyrics that reflect his own experiences on the streets, his addition to the track maintains the intensity of the original focusing on overcoming hardships and embracing a life marked by violence, while King Von left an indelible mark on the original, Polo G successfully adds a new dimension to the track, proving to be a worthy collaborator in honoring the late rapper's legacy and in making it a powerful tribute to Bennett. The remix was released alongside a new music video, continuing the success of the original, which has garnered a good amount of streamings on YouTube.
