= King Von =

American rapper (1994–2020)

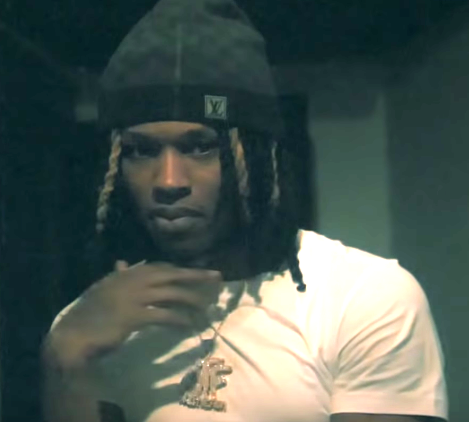
- Bennett in 2019

Background information
- Also known as: Von; Grandson; V.Roy; King Von 600
- Born: Dayvon Daquan Bennett; August 9, 1994; Chicago, Illinois, U.S.
- Died: November 6, 2020 (aged 26) Atlanta, Georgia, U.S.
- Cause of death: Gunshot wounds
- Genres: Midwestern hip-hop; drill; trap; gangsta rap
- Occupations: Rapper; songwriter
- Works: Discography
- Years active: 2018–2020
- Labels: Only the Family; Empire
- Formerly of: Only the Family
- Children: 3
- Partner: Asian Doll (2018–2020)
- Website: kingvonofficial.com

Dayvon Daquan Bennett (August 9, 1994 – November 6, 2020), known professionally as King Von, was an American rapper and street gangster from Chicago, Illinois. He was affiliated with the Black Disciples gang of South Side, Chicago, and was an exemplary figure of drill music, a subcategory of hip-hop originating from the area.

Bennett gained recognition for his storytelling and vivid lyricism, noted by critics on his 2018 single "Crazy Story". Prior to its release, he signed with fellow Chicagoan Lil Durk's label Only the Family, through which he released his debut mixtape Grandson, Vol. 1 (2019), and its follow-up Levon James (2020), both of which moderately entered the Billboard 200 as independent releases. "Crazy Story", along with his 2020 single "Took Her to the O", received triple platinum certification by the Recording Industry Association of America (RIAA). The latter became his first solo Billboard Hot 100 entry and preceded his debut studio album, Welcome to O'Block (2020), which peaked at number five on the Billboard 200.

On November 6, 2020, Bennett was fatally shot in Atlanta, Georgia, at the age of 26, following an altercation outside a hookah lounge. His second album and first posthumous release, What It Means to Be King (2022), debuted at number two on the Billboard 200, as did his third album and final posthumous release, Grandson (2023).

== Early life ==
Dayvon Daquan Bennett was born on August 9, 1994, in Chicago, Illinois. He had six half-siblings from his father, Walter E. Bennett, and three siblings from his mother, Taesha. He was raised mostly by his mother in the Parkway Garden Homes, an area more commonly known as "O'Block", located on Chicago's South Side within the Greater Grand Crossing community area. His relationship with his father was inconsistent due to his father's incarcerations. When Von was 10 years old, his father was killed by an unseen gunman. Von later paid tribute to his father in multiple songs.

Bennett was involved in the emergence of drill music through his association with Chief Keef and Lil Durk. However, he was frequently incarcerated throughout the 2010s for a multitude of serious criminal charges, which made him known in Chicago's drill scene even before he began recording music. At age 16, Bennett went to juvenile detention for armed robbery in January 2011. While incarcerated, Bennett earned his GED. After being released, Bennett attended a few classes at South Suburban College in South Holland, Illinois, before dropping out. In July 2014, Bennett was charged with one count of first-degree murder and two counts of attempted murder in connection with a shooting that killed one and injured two others. After being detained in the Cook County jail for over three years, he was acquitted in December 2017 and began his musical career.

== Career ==
=== 2017–2019: Career beginnings and Grandson, Vol. 1 ===
Upon Von's release from jail in December 2017, fellow rapper Lil Durk signed Von to Durk's Only the Family label. Von then released a series of singles. The first of these singles was "Beat Dat Body", which featured fellow late Chicago rapper THF Zoo, and was released on June 17, 2018. Von subsequently appeared on the Lil Durk Presents: Only The Family Involved album, which was released on July 31. He featured on the song "Problems", which had an accompanying music video released on August 9. Von then released the single "War With Us" on October 18. Von's single "Crazy Story" was released on December 6. It became his breakout single, notable for his narration of an attempted robbery in his hometown in Chicago, and reaching number 81 on the Billboard Hot 100.

On January 9, 2019, Von was featured on the remix of "Exposing Me", a song by fellow Chicago rapper Memo600. Von and Memo600 swapped bars disrespecting and detailing real life feuds or altercations against other nearby neighborhood rivals. A response from the targets arose when rappers FBG Duck and Rooga dropped their own remix of the song on February 4. Both songs were produced off the sampling of original Indian song Sanam Re. Following the success, a series of remixes for the song were made by other artists both in the United States and in Europe. On February 14, Von's then-girlfriend, rapper Asian Doll, released a music video for her track about him, "Grandson", in which he appeared. On May 3, "Crazy Story 2.0" featuring Lil Durk was released, and a music video was later released seventeen days later; the song peaked at number four on the Bubbling Under Hot 100 chart. Its third and final rendition of the single followed on September 13.

On July 9, 2019, Lil Durk and King Von released their collaborative single "Like That". On September 2, Von released his single "What It's Like", as the single forerunner of his first mixtape album announced in September. The mixtape later released on September 19 under the title, Grandson, Vol. 1, consisting of thirteen tracks and being executively produced by Chopsquad DJ. It contains three features represented by "Twin Nem" and by the remix of "Crazy Story", both featuring Durk; the other feature consists on the collaboration with Chicago artist and OTF affiliate Booka600 on "Jet". The mixtape also includes tracks "Crazy Story", "Crazy Story, Pt. 3", and his second ever single "War With Us" dating back to October 18, 2018. Grandson, Vol. 1 debuted at number 75 and later peaking at number 53, on the Billboard 200, also it reached number 27 on the Hip Hop/R&B albums chart, and number 9 on the Independent Albums chart.

=== 2020: Levon James and Welcome to O'Block ===
On November 16, 2019, Von released his single "2 A.M." followed by a corresponding video to be released the same day. On November 29, 2019, Von released his single "Rollin" featuring YNW Melly, accompanied with a music video. He later released, on February 21, 2020, "Took Her to the O", with a music video, which became his most successful single. "Took Her to the O" and "Rollin" were later included on his second mixtape, Levon James, that was released on March 6, 2020, which debuted at number 63 and later peaking at number 40 on the Billboard 200. It was released through Only the Family Entertainment/Empire and consists in a 16-track mixtape executively produced by Chopsquad DJ, featuring verses from NLE Choppa, Tee Grizzley, G Herbo, Lil Durk, YNW Melly, Booka600 and Yungeen Ace.

An official video for "On Yo Ass" was released on March 6, 2020, coinciding with the album release date. The song features Chicago artist G Herbo, with production from Chopsquad DJ. On March 20, 2020, an official video for "Trust Issues" was released, featuring Florida rapper Yungeen Ace; in the song Von switched up his gangsta focus to show his softer side. On April 6, 2020, Bennett releases an official music video for 3 A.M. on YouTube, following on April 29, 2020, the release of his single "Grandson For President" that later was incorporated as a single for What It Means to Be King album. He followed the single up closely with a music video release for "Broke Opps", another song from his Levon James album.

In 2020, King Von began work on Welcome to O'Block, which would ultimately be released as his debut studio album and the only one issued during his lifetime. He first released the album's lead single, "Why He Told" on July 27, 2020, accompanied by a music video published on his YouTube channel. This was followed by the single "All These Niggas" on August 5, 2020, featuring Chicago rapper Lil Durk; due to legal reasons, Durk was unable to appear in the accompanying video, which was released the same day and garnered 24 million views within two months on the platform. He then released another single, titled "How It Go", in conjunction with another music video, on August 26, 2020.

On October 9, 2020, King Von released "I Am What I Am", featuring New York rapper Fivio Foreign, along with a music video. Two weeks later Bennett released "Gleesh Place" in combination with another music video on his official channel. This release was in anticipation of the official release of Welcome to O'Block that came out on October 30, 2020. The 16-track album features production Chopsquad DJ, Tay Keith, Wheezy and Hitmaka, among others; it also features artists Prince Dre, Lil Durk, Dreezy, Moneybagg Yo. The album includes the Polo G collaboration "The Code", which was released with a music video. The project peaked at number 5 on Billboard for US Top 200 albums, number 1 for Top R&B/Hip Hop albums, number 1 for Top Independents album and peaked 12th for Top 100 Canadian albums.

In an interview for Complex, Bennett revealed his vision regarding the new upcoming project and the main differences from his previous work, Levon James, declaring: "If you're doing something and keep doing it, you're gonna get better results. Everything better. It is the one for real, I've been working hard". In another interview for Uproxx, he declared that he wanted to dedicate the project to his neighborhood, and to all the people who lived and struggled there. He died one week after the album was released. After his death, the music videos for "Wayne's Story", "Armed & Dangerous", "Mine Too", and "Demon" were released.

== Posthumous releases ==
=== 2020–2022: Features and What It Means to Be King ===
On December 14, 2020, just a month after Bennett's death, Funkmaster Flex released the official video for "Lurkin" on his official YouTube channel, representing the first posthumous appearance in a music visual for Bennett; however, the song dated back to October 22, 2020. On December 24, 2020, Lil Durk released his album, The Voice, as a tribute to Bennett, who, along with Durk, appears on the album cover as the central figure and is also featured on the song "Still Trappin'". In an interview on February 26, 2021, Bennett's manager stated that Von had over 300 unreleased songs, or around 10 albums worth of content, which they would continue to release with the family's concession in subsequent years with the aim of keeping his legacy alive.

On March 3, 2021, Bennett was featured on the compilation album Loyal Bros by American record label Only the Family. He appeared on Three tracks including "Out the Roof" which also features Chicago rappers Lil Durk and Booka600; "Me and Doodie Lo" featuring Doodie Lo, which was released before Bennett's demise and later used as the lead single of the album. That also included a music video released on August 21, 2020. Finally, he appeared on the last single of the project "Jump" still featuring Lil Durk, Booka600 and Memo600. A music video for the song was filmed before Bennett's death and released simultaneously on the same day as the single's release, on March 3, 2021.

On February 4, 2022, his management team announced a new album by the rapper titled What It Means to Be King. On the following day, February 5, the promotional single "Don't Play That" was released, featuring the American rapper 21 Savage, and finds the pair delivering couplets atop a production by Kid Hazel; an official music video for the song was released on February 9, 2022. This followed the release of his second album extract named "War" on March 2, 2022, the piece is accompanied by an official visualizer video. These two songs achieved commercial success, reaching respectively number 40 and number 63 on the Billboard Hot 100.

On March 4, 2022, the album was released through Empire Distribution and Only the Family and by his management team, representing King Von's second studio album and first posthumous work. The album features guest appearances from G Herbo, 21 Savage, Fivio Foreign, Moneybagg Yo, Lil Durk, Tee Grizzley, A Boogie wit da Hoodie, Dreezy, Boss Top, DqFrmDaO, and OMB Peezy. Production was handled by Chopsquad DJ, Hitmaka, Tee Romano, Kid Hazel, Touch of Trent, DJ Bandz, DJ FMCT, Glaazer, Diego Ave, Bankroll Got It, TM88, ATL Jacob, Geraldo Liive, CGM Beats, John Lam, and Raw Equity. The tracklist includes song "Grandson For President" an acclaimed single which dated back to April 2020, this making it, by fact, the lead single of the album. The record peaked at number 2 on the Billboard 200, earning 59,000 album-equivalent units, of which 55,000 came from 79 million in streams, and 4,000 by pure album sales. This result turns out to be his best ranking and the second top 10 for King Von in the Billboard 200, who first reached the top 10 with his debut studio album Welcome to O’Block which reached the number 5. Shortly thereafter, the music videos for two excerpts from his discs were released: "Too Real" was released on March 7, 2022, and "Get it Done" was released on his birthday, August 9, 2022.

=== 2023–present: Grandson ===
In January 2023, King Von's manager announced with a post on Instagram, the drop of a new posthumous project by the rapper, scheduled for the same year. In June, the album's title was announced to be Grandson which recalls to Von's first mixtape, Grandson, Vol. 1, and it is a reference to his renowned nickname, which an inmate gave him during his incarceration period in Cook County Jail from 2014 to 2017. The record was handled by the rapper's closest collaborators and by his mother herself.

Three singles were released in the lead-up to the album. The first, "Robberies", was released on June 23, 2023, with an official video released the same day; the second, named "Heartless", featured Tee Grizzley and was released on July 7, 2023, with an official visualizer. The project itself was released on July 14, 2023, representing Bennett's third studio album and second posthumous work. It was hand out alongside a music video for the song "Don't Miss", which shooting dates back to the late 2020. Plus was released an official visualizer for each track on the album.

The production on the album was handled by various producers including ATL Jacob, Chopsquad DJ, David Morse, DJ Bandz, Ghostrage, IllaDaProducer, Mac Fly, Raw Equity, Scott Storch, Southside, Tahj Money, Twysted Genius, Wheezy; most of which had already collaborated with Bennett on previous albums. It features guest appearances from G Herbo, Polo G, Lil Durk, Tee Grizzley, BreezyLyn, Tink, 42 Dugg, Moneybagg Yo, and Hotboii. It reached the 14th position on the Billboard 200, and went 2nd on the Billboard Independent Albums, 4th on the Billboard Top R&B/Hip Hop Albums, number 31 for Billboard top 100 Canada and number 20 on the New Zealand top 40.

== Artistry ==
=== Style and rapping technique ===
King Von's musical style has been described as drill music, (Note: Attributed to multiple sources:) a categorization he acknowledged in an interview with DJ Akademiks. Hip-hop publications have labeled Von one of the best pure lyricists in Chicago drill, and as more stylistically diverse than most other rappers in that genre. Von has also received critical praise for his sense of focus, delivery, wordplay, and sharp songwriting. Mark Braboy of Complex described Von as a thoughtful, skillful lyricist who surpassed other Chicago drill artists in the ferocity and resonance of his delivery. Jayson Buford from Tablet observed that Von remained culturally relevant years after his death; Buford attributed the phenomenon both to Von's proximity to violence and to his extraordinary lyrical skills. Will Schube of NPR identified the characteristic feature of Von's style as his ability to craft vivid narratives that balance nihilism, humor, and empathy; Schube identified "Took Her to the O" as one of the style's strongest representations.

==== Storytelling ====
King Von was known for the use of storytelling in his songs and his aggressive style, with songs such as "Crazy Story" and "Took Her to the O" for examples. His narration has also been defined by HotNewHipHop as "impeccable" and equipped "with a vengeance and uncut authenticity"; it has also been described as "vivid". Pitchfork eulogizes his ability to tell a coherent story as its narrator with associated dialogue insertion in his verses. Von maximized his storytelling strengths across a trio of critically acclaimed efforts, Grandson, Vol. 1, Levon James, and Welcome to O'Block, with each project showcasing the full complexities of his personality, as Von fleshed out narratives that are rarely seen in mainstream rap.

Bennett's narrative technique often drew from his lived experiences, (Note: Attributed to multiple sources:) and has also been compared to that of other various artists, such as Ice-T, and the late Speaker Knockerz. Specifically, songs like "Took Her to the O" and "Crazy Story" have been compared to "Children's Story" by Slick Rick. Bennett himself says that he has often been compared with Meek Mill's narrative technique. Von's storytelling style and ability was inspired by his childhood in Englewood, and draws on urban novels he read while incarcerated. He reported having read a large number of books by Sister Souljah. He also liked books by Ashley & JaQuavis, especially the book "The Cartel", and "The Ultimate Sacrifice" by Anthony Fields. He also appreciated the Twilight novels.

=== Influences ===
King Von cited several MCs as influences on his rapping style, including artists he listened to in his teen years such as Lil Wayne, Gucci Mane and Waka Flocka Flame, and other Chicago rappers such as Twista, Kanye West, G Herbo, Lil Bibby, and Lil Durk.

== Personal life ==
Bennett was in an on-and-off relationship with Texas rapper Asian Doll, but the two were reportedly not in a relationship at the time of his death. Bennett had three children. His cousin, Calboy, is also a drill rapper.

=== Legal issues ===
In April 2014, Bennett was questioned by police as a person of interest in the fatal shooting of 17-year-old Gangster Disciples member Gakirah "K.I." Barnes, but the police were unable to charge him due to inconsistencies in witness statements. In 2021, unsealed documents released by the Chicago Police Department named Bennett as Barnes' killer.

On July 24, 2014, Bennett was arrested in connection with a shooting in May 2014, resulting in the death of Malcolm Stuckey and the injury of two other men. Bennett was charged with one count of first-degree murder and two counts of attempted murder. The shooting took place in Englewood, Chicago. Bennett was found not guilty in December 2017.

In May 2019, Bennett and Lil Durk were arrested in connection with a shooting in Atlanta. Bennett and his co-defendant Durk appeared before a judge in a Fulton County courtroom for a probable cause hearing. Prosecutors claimed that the two rappers robbed and shot Alexander Witherspoon outside a popular drive-in on February 5. After weeks in jail, Durk was released on a $250,000 bond, while Von was released on a $300,000 bond. The charges against Durk were dropped in October 2022.

In January 2023, after Bennett's death, the FBI declassified a number of documents showing that a confidential informant alleged that Bennett initially placed a $50K hit on Carlton "FBG Duck" Weekly, before raising the price to $100,000. Weekly was murdered in the Gold Coast area of Chicago in August 2020. Five people were later arrested and found guilty of this murder. On October 9, 2024, it was reported that Bennett's estate, along with both Durk and OTF Records, were named in a wrongful death lawsuit by the estate and family of Weekly. The lawsuit and its attorneys claimed that Durk and his OTF Records imprint, of which Bennett was a signee, were "profiting off of Weekly's death through negligence and misconduct".

== Death ==
On November 6, 2020, at around 3 a.m., Bennett and his crew were involved in an altercation with Quando Rondo's crew outside of the Monaco Hookah Lounge in Atlanta, Georgia. The dispute quickly escalated into gunfire, and Bennett was shot multiple times. He was transported to a hospital in critical condition and died there later that day. He was 26 years old. The Georgia Bureau of Investigation reported that two people were killed and six wounded. One of the wounded men, while being treated for a gunshot wound, was placed in police custody for Bennett's murder. The suspect was identified as 22-year-old Timothy "Lul Timm" Leeks, a rapper affiliated with Quando Rondo. In August 2023, charges were dropped against Leeks under Georgia's "stand-your-ground" law. On November 14, 2020, Bennett was buried at Burr Oak Cemetery in Alsip, Cook County, Illinois.

In October 2024, Chicago rapper and Bennett's close friend Lil Durk, was arrested near Miami International Airport on federal charges, including conspiracy to commit murder-for-hire. The government alleged that Durk orchestrated a plot targeting rapper Quando Rondo, purportedly in retaliation for the 2020 killing of Bennett, resulting in the death of Quando Rondo's cousin, Saviay'a "Lul Pab" Robinson. Five members of Durk's collective, Only the Family (OTF), were also arrested in connection with this case.

=== Remembrance ===
During the 63rd Annual Grammy Awards, Bennett was included in the In Memoriam montage. In August 2021, a mural depicting King Von was painted by artist Chris Devins on a large wall overlooking Martin Luther King Drive in the Parkway Gardens complex, where Von was raised; the work was commissioned by Delilah Martinez, an art gallery owner and founder of the Mural Movement, self-described as "a creative response to the murder of George Floyd." Bennett was depicted with a backward baseball cap and wearing a silver "O'Block" chain. The mural attracted controversy among Chicago residents, with some arguing it glorified gang violence and would attract gang-related crime to the area. The mural was removed from Parkway Gardens on November 29, 2024.

== Discography ==
Studio albums

- Welcome to O'Block (2020)

Posthumous studio albums

- What It Means to Be King (2022)
- Grandson (2023)

== See also ==
- List of murdered hip-hop musicians
