= Crazy Story =

2018 single by King Von

Single by King Von

from the album Grandson, Vol. 1
- Released: December 6, 2018
- Genre: Gangsta rap; drill
- Length: 2:26
- Label: Only the Family; Empire
- Songwriter: Dayvon Bennett
- Producer: Mac Fly

King Von singles chronology
"Problems" (2018)	"Crazy Story" (2018)	"Crazy Story (Remix)" (2019)

Music video
- "Crazy Story (Official Music Video)" on YouTube
- "Crazy Story (OTF)" on YouTube
- "Crazy Story (Remix)" on YouTube

Remix cover
- Cover art of the "Crazy Story 2.0" featuring Lil Durk.

"Crazy Story" is a song by American rapper King Von, released on December 6, 2018, as his debut single through Only the Family and Empire Distribution. The song is one of Von's most popular songs and it is considered his breakout hit. It was followed by two sequels: "Crazy Story 2.0" and "Crazy Story, Pt. 3". All three singles appear on Von's mixtape Grandson, Vol. 1 (2019), while "Crazy Story" was included on Only The Family mixtape Only The Family Involved Vol. 2.

"Crazy Story" currently has more than 148 million views on Von's official YouTube channel, as well as over 86 million on WorldStarHipHop's YouTube channel as of January 2026. The song peaked at number 81 on the Billboard Hot 100 and was certified triple platinum by the Recording Industry Association of America on February 15, 2023, selling more than 3 million certified units since its release.

== Background ==
The song was recorded in 2018 after Bennett signed to Lil Durk’s Only the Family label. He had recently been released from prison after charges in a murder and attempted murder case were dropped. King Von stated that he wrote the lyrics without an instrumental while traveling from Atlanta to Chicago, and later chose a fitting beat during a studio session.

== Composition ==
"Crazy Story" is a drill song produced by Mac Fly. The lyrics "dives into a story detailing the realities of his hometown of Chicago by narrating an attempted robbery." King Von utilizes characterization, dialogue, intricate wordplay, vivid imagery, and pop culture references in the lyrics.

== Music video ==
In the video, King Von enthusiastically relates the story to his friends, intercut with dramatized clips of the story.

King Von recorded a live session of "Crazy Story" for Genius website participating at the format "Open Mic", that was released with an annexed video on March 10, 2020, on YouTube platform.

== Critical reception ==
"Crazy Story" received generally positive reviews from critics. Alphonse Pierre of Pitchfork praised Von's storytelling, especially the elements that make the story vivid and coherent and his ability to insert characters and dialogue in his verses with ease. For Trey Alston by Vulture the song set the tone for Von’s career and raised the potential for surreal lyricism in drill. Revolt Tv instead declared that "Crazy Story" represented an infectious hit that cemented Bennett as one of the best storytellers in hip hop with that record alone, thanks to dynamic flows in it and cadences coinciding with his storytelling, also taking drill music to greater heights. While Mark Braboy that wrote for Complex, defined songs like those from "Crazy Story" series and "Took Her to the O" as pieces that brought back catchy narrative sing-alongs, reminiscent of what Slick Rick did with "Children's Story"; plus he defined King Von as thoughtful, skillful lyricist, and different from others Chicago drill artists as able to deliver it in a ferocious and resonating package that was unrivaled. HotNewHipHop declared that “Crazy Story” created the foundations, that with his subsequent efforts, cemented him as one of drill’s great storytellers. While Will Schube by npr wrote that the track encapsulates everything that made him the next voice of Chicago rap, being both witty and tragic, and stuck between justifying violence and lamenting the fact that it ever had to come to that.

== Aftermath ==
After the viral success, that perpetuated until the spring of 2020, "Crazy Story" had fans all over quoting the most famous catchphrase contained in the song's lyrics, "From 64th and 65th, we not from 63rd."

== Sequels ==
=== Crazy Story 2.0 ===
The official remix of the song is titled "Crazy Story (Remix)" or "Crazy Story 2.0" and features American rapper Lil Durk. It was released on May 3, 2019. It represents the direct continuation of "Crazy Story" and the prelude to "Crazy Story, Pt. 3". "Crazy Story 2.0" employs the same instrumental of the first piece, that was produced by Mac Fly. The song peaked at number 81 on the Billboard Hot 100.

The verse from Von is the same as the original song, however, there is the addition of Durk's verse that uses a flow that takes Von's cadence and metrics, but adapting them to his style. Basically Durk continues the first story telling with the aftermath of the events and depicting a scenario of revenge for the previous ambush by the "opps".

The music video was released on May 20, 2019. It shows Von and Durk in the neighborhood with other OTF members, including Booka600, Memo600, Doodie Lo, with interspersed scenes of shootings describing the lyrics of the song.

=== Crazy Story, Pt. 3 ===
Crazy Story, Pt. 3 is characterized by a rapped style in very vivid and richly detailed storytelling and as for the first two chapters, it is centered around a realistic story based on lived experiences of Bennett, and where he is the protagonist, Talking about an attempted robbery that is revealed as a set up against Von, who favored this girl, that leading to Von being shot and car chased till the police makes Von and his oppositor divide, as some lyrics of the song report: "Plus I got one arm I'm tryna drive, I can't shoot back now This man on my ass, I almost crash But I got the wheel, he tryna keep it real But there go 12, he bust a quick right And I just bust a left". Later in the story Von, in response to the previous occurrence, will have revenge by ambushing and killing the girl and shooting at the same man who shot him before.

The music video was released on January 30, 2020. It frames King Von who retraces the story describing the facts to a friend of his, therefore with interspersed scenes in both first and third person.

== Charts ==
=== "Crazy Story 2.0" charts ===
Chart (2020)	Peak position
Global 200 (Billboard)	178
US Billboard Hot 100	81
US Hot R&B/Hip-Hop Songs (Billboard)	32

== Certifications ==
=== "Crazy Story" certifications ===
Region	Certification	Certified units/sales
United Kingdom (BPI)	Silver	200,000^{‡}
United States (RIAA)	3× Platinum	3,000,000^{‡}
^{‡} Sales+streaming figures based on certification alone.

=== "Crazy Story 2.0" certifications ===
Region	Certification	Certified units/sales
United States (RIAA)	3× Platinum	3,000,000^{‡}
^{‡} Sales+streaming figures based on certification alone.

=== "Crazy Story, Pt. 3" certifications ===
Region	Certification	Certified units/sales
New Zealand (RMNZ)	Platinum	30,000^{‡}
United States (RIAA)	Platinum	1,000,000^{‡}
^{‡} Sales+streaming figures based on certification alone.
