= Chopsquad DJ =

American record producer

- Also known as: ChopSquad DJ; DJ On Da Beat So Issa Banga
- Born: Darrell Gregory Jackson; September 13, 1993 (age 32); St. Louis, Missouri, U.S.
- Genres: Midwestern hip-hop; drill; trap; R&B
- Occupations: Record producer; programmer
- Years active: 2010–present
- Labels: Boominati Worldwide; Chop Squad; Warner Chappell

Darrell Gregory Jackson (born September 13, 1993), known professionally as Chopsquad DJ, is an American record producer, songwriter, and DJ. He is known for his frequent use of dark piano melodies in his beats. His stage name is adapted from his former role as the in-house DJ for record producer Young Chop's record label, ChopSquad.

Chopsquad DJ has produced several hit songs throughout his career, such as "Took Her to the O", "Armed & Dangerous", "Crazy Story, Pt. 3" and "All These Niggas" by King Von, "Wishing Well" by Juice Wrld, "What Happened To Virgil", "Decline", and "No Standards" by Lil Durk, "Topanga" by Trippie Redd, "Young Grizzley World" by Tee Grizzley, and “FDO” by Pooh Shiesty. He was credited as executive producer for Tee Grizzley's album, Activated (2018) and King Von's album Welcome to O'Block (2020)—both of which peaked within the top ten of the Billboard 200. Lil Durk's song "What Happened to Virgil" remains his highest charting production on the US Billboard Hot 100—peaking at number 22. The song also received double platinum certification by the Recording Industry Association of America (RIAA).

== Early life ==
Darrell Gregory Jackson was born on September 13, 1993, in St. Louis, Missouri. He was orphaned when he was younger until Ralph and Clara Jackson took him in as their own. After receiving piano instruction for nine years, he enrolled at Cardinal Ritter College Prep High School.

== Musical career ==
=== 2012-2014: Career beginnings ===
Before being introduced to FL Studio, he started performing for nearby churches as a teenager to hone his skills. He met Johnny May Cash, who introduced him to Young Chop, and switched his attention to hip hop production after dropping out of Robert Morris University after his first year. Chopsquad was introduced to Metro Boomin in 2012.

Chopsquad DJ has collaborated with many artists including: Chief Keef, Lil Durk, Lil Reese, Young Thug, T.I., Tee Grizzley, Famous Dex, G Herbo, Yung Bans, Sada Baby, Lil Tjay, YFN Lucci, YNW Melly, YNW BSlime, A Boogie wit da Hoodie, King Von, Asian Doll, Polo G, 24hrs, PnB Rock, Future, Doe Boy, Tory Lanez, Lil Mosey, Mozzy, Fetty Wap, UnoTheActivist, Trouble, NLE Choppa, Meek Mill, Gucci Mane, Migos, Juice Wrld, Rae Sremmurd, Swae Lee, Trippie Redd, Fabolous, Yo Gotti, Lucki, Chance the Rapper and more.

=== 2015-16: Rise to fame ===
With the help of Young Chop's brand and the connection with Warner Chappell Music, Chopsquad started working as a ghost producer. Through his travels, he began to develop a relationship with Chief Keef, who eventually gave him the moniker "Chopsquad DJ" after the release of his mixtape Sorry 4 the Weight in 2015, the majority of which he produced. This helped to advance his career and introduce him to the hip hop scene at large.

Forever Chopsquad (2015), is the first official joint project from Chopsquad DJ, was released on November 15, 2015. The 11-track mixtape, which included songs by Lil Durk, Chief Keef, Young Thug, Gucci Mane, and Migos; was released as a follow-up to the GLOTF mixtape that was never made.

=== 2016-present ===
On the year of 2016, Chopsquad DJ contributed vocals to the song "Fool With It" from Young Chop's debut studio album King Chop (2016), before producing two tracks from Lil Durk's critically acclaimed album Lil Durk 2X; which reached at #5 on the Top R&B/Hip-Hop Albums and at #29 on the Billboard 200 charts, respectively. Plus, he produced a song called "Rich Forever"; which is from Lil Durk's mixtape They Forgot (2016). And on December 23, 2016, Chopsquad later produced "They Like" by Yo Gotti and YFN Lucci; from his commercial mixtape White Friday (CM9) (2016).

On February 28, 2017, Chopsquad produced "No Choice" on Lil Durk's mixtape Love Songs 4 The Streets (2017). During the following year, he later produced three songs for Lil Durk and Lil Reese's collaboration mixtape Supa Vultures (2017); and he also produced four songs for Lil Durk and Tee Grizzley's collaboration mixtape Bloodas (2017).

On 2018, Chopsquad has produced numerous songs for Tee Grizzley's debut album Activated (2018); which was released May 11, 2018. The album was later debuted at number 10 on the Billboard 200, making Chopsquad DJ's first successful US-top 10 as a producer. Next, he collaborated with 808 Mafia member Southside and he co-produced for G Herbo's song "Some Nights", from his project Swervo; which was released on July 27, 2018. And finally, on November 9, 2018, he later produced 4 songs for Lil Durk's third studio album Signed to the Streets 3; he co-produced the song "India, Pt. 2", while a 808 Mafia member TM88 served as the main producer on the song.

On January 3, 2019, on an interview with Producergrind Podcast, Chopsquad says that he met Metro Boomin since 2012. And he also announced that he signed to Metro's Boominati Worldwide imprint. During the year of 2019, Chopsquad produced four songs for Tee Grizzley's sophomore album Scriptures (2019). Chopsquad later produced two songs for American rapper Yung Bans; "Yeaaa!" and "SOS"; from his project Misunderstood (2019). Next, Chopsquad produced four songs for Lil Durk's fourth studio album Love Songs 4 The Streets 2 (2019); which was released on August 2, 2019. The album debuted at number 4 on the Billboard 200, scoring Chopsquad's second US top-5 as a producer. Meanwhile, Chopsquad started to produce songs for Lil Durk's OTF member King Von. On September 20, 2019, he executive produced Von's debut mixtape Grandson, Vol. 1, where he produced all six songs on the project. Chopsquad later continues to produce numerous songs for Von. In November 2019, Chopsquad produced YNW Melly's song "Two Face" from his debut album Melly vs. Melvin (2019); the album later peaked at #8 on the Billboard 200, scoring Chopsquad's third top-10 as a producer. And, he later produced Fabolous and Lil Durk's song "Cap"; from Fabolous' album Summertime Shootout 3: Coldest Summer Ever (2019); the album also debuted at #7 on the Billboard 200, making Chopsquad's fourth US top-10 project as a producer.

On 2020, Chopsquad once again executive produced King Von's second mixtape Levon James; where he produced seven songs on the project. On October 29, 2020, he mainly produced all songs for King Von's debut album Welcome to O'Block, which debuted on number 14 on the Billboard 200. After the news broke out about King Von shot and killed at a hookah lounge, the album climbed to number 5, dated on November 21, 2020, making Chopsquad's fifth successful top-5 album as a producer. On December 24, 2020, Chopsquad also produced Lil Durk's song "Free Jamell" featuring YNW Melly, from his sixth album The Voice; which the album later debuted at number 46 on the Billboard 200, in its first week. Afterwards, the album climbed to number three. Lil Durk released a deluxe version of The Voice on January 29, 2021; where Chopsquad produced "Finesse Out the Gang Way" featuring Lil Baby. The album later climbed to number two, scoring Chopsquad's sixth top-5 album as a producer on the album.

During the year of 2021, Chopsquad later produced Tee Grizzley and his younger brother Baby Grizzley's song "Gave That Back". Chopsquad later produced Tee Grizzley's "Late Night Calls" and "Robbery, Pt. 2" on the month of February 2021. On March 5, 2021, Chopsquad later produced a song for Lil Durk and OTF compilation album Loyal Bros. On May 7, 2021, Chopsquad produced 7 songs for Tee Grizzley's third album Built For Whatever (2021). He later produced Mozzy's song called "Slimey", which is from his project Untreated Trauma (2021); and he also produced two songs for Fetty Wap on his second long-awaited album The Butterfly Effect (2021).

On March 4, 2022, Chopsquad solely produced numerous songs for King Von's second and the first posthumous studio album What It Means To Be King, as well as Lil Durk, on his seventh album 7220, which both debuted in the top five of the Billboard 200, scoring both Chopsquad's seventh and eighth top-5 projects as a successful producer. On December 16, 2022, Chopsquad produced three songs for Lil Durk and OTF compilation album, Loyal Bros 2.

== Production style ==
Due to his background as a pianist growing up, Chopsquad DJ is most recognized for his use of FL Studio and for his frequent use of dark melodies in his beats.

=== Producer tags ===
On every song that Chopsquad DJ produced, he has an original tag where it says "Chopsquad".

His current tag "Chopsquad DJ on da beat, so issa banger", was performed by Lil Durk. The origin of the tag came from his 2015 debut project Forever Chopsquad. The tag appeared first in "Don't Even Trip" by Tee Grizzley featuring Moneybagg Yo, from the album Activated (2018); and it was later used in Trippie Redd's 2018 hit song, "Topanga" from the mixtape A Love Letter to You 3 (2018). The tag was later shortened to "DJ on the beat, so issa banger". And also, Chopsquad DJ on an interview with DJ Smallz, says that he and his Boominati labelmate Metro Boomin, uses a sound tag of a woman laughing. Chopsquad also uses a very short tag where it only says "banger", which was also performed by Durk.

In 2022, Chopsquad DJ's latest tag "Oh yeah, I'm finna make a banger with this one" (which was performed by King Von), can be heard in the most hit song "What Happened To Virgil" from Lil Durk's album 7220. The tag was originated from the track "Crazy Story, Pt. 3" from King Von's debut mixtape Grandson, Vol. 1 (2019).

== Discography ==
=== Mixtapes ===
List of mixtapes and selected details
Title	Album details
Forever Chopsquad	Released: November 15, 2015; Label: Chop Squad, Warner Chappell; Format: Digital download
