= Only the Family =

American hip hop collective from Chicago

Background information
- Origin: Chicago, Illinois, U.S.
- Genres: Hip hop; drill
- Years active: 2010–present
- Labels: Alamo; Sony Music (Lil Durk); OTF; Empire

Only the Family, often abbreviated as OTF, is an American hip hop group and a record label from Chicago, Illinois, formed in 2010. The group is composed of Chicago-based rappers, which included the late King Von and iconic Chicago rapper Lil Durk, as well at the label's current CEO, Cedrick "SB" Earsery.

== Record label ==
The OTF label was part of French Montana's Coke Boys, and as a result, adopted the nickname 'OTF Coke Boys'. This saw OTF members feature on the subsequent Coke Boys album.

The label has since grown to be independent from the Coke Boys imprint and is now cooperating with Empire Distribution, except for Lil Durk. Durk signed to Alamo Records and Interscope Records in 2018, after being released from his Def Jam Recordings Contract. His releases for Alamo are now distributed by Sony Music, after Sony acquired the label in June 2021.

== Notable artists ==
Act	Year signed	Releases (under the label)
Lil Durk	Founder, 2010	29
Doodie Lo	2013	5
Lil Mexico	2020	1
Hypno Carlito	2015	5
Booka600	2016	6
YFG Fatso	2024	-
Chuckyy	2024	-

=== Former ===
Act	Years on the label	Releases (under the label)
Yung Tory	2017–2018	—
King Von (deceased)	2018–2020	10
THF Bayzoo (deceased)	2018–2025	3

== Discography ==
=== Compilation albums ===
List of albums
Title	Album details	Peak chart positions			
Title	Album details	US	US R&B/HH	US Rap	CAN
Only the Family Involved, Vol.1 (with Lil Durk)	Released: July 31, 2018; Label: OTF, Empire; Format: Digital download, streaming	—	—	—	—
Only the Family Involved, Vol.2 (with Lil Durk)	Released: December 21, 2018; Label: OTF, Empire; Format: Digital download, streaming	—	—	—	—
Family over Everything (with Lil Durk)	Released: December 11, 2019; Label: OTF, Alamo, Interscope; Format: Digital download, streaming	93	42	—	—
Loyal Bros	Released: March 5, 2021; Label: OTF, Empire; Format: Digital download, streaming	12	6	5	54
Loyal Bros 2 (with Lil Durk)	Released: December 16, 2022; Label: OTF, Empire; Format: Digital download, streaming	37	13	6	79
Nightmares in the Trenches (with Lil Durk)	Released: November 17, 2023; Label: OTF, Empire; Format: Digital download, streaming	114	40	—	—

=== Singles ===
Title	Year	Peak chart positions	Certifications	Album
Title	Year	US	Certifications	Album
"Riot" (with Lil Durk and Booka600 featuring G Herbo)	2019	—		Family over Everything
"Smurk Carter" (with Lil Durk)	2023	95		Nightmares in the Trenches

=== Other charted and certified songs ===
Title	Year	Peak chart positions	Certifications	Album
Title	Year	US	Certifications	Album
"No Auto Durk" (featuring Lil Durk)	2018	—	RIAA: Platinum	Only the Family Involved, Vol. 2
"Hellcats & Trackhawks" (with Lil Durk)	2021	69	RIAA: Platinum	Loyal Bros
