= Deep Thoughts (Lil Durk album) =

Studio album by Lil Durk (2025)

Studio album by Lil Durk
- Released: March 28, 2025
- Recorded: 2023–2024
- Genre: Hip-hop
- Length: 45:15
- Label: Only the Family; Alamo; Sony
- Producer: Aidan Crotinger; Ayo Bleu; Ayo Peewee; Bangs; Benny Blanco; BoogzDaBeast; Brutei; Cashmere Cat; Chopsquad DJ; Desro; Devin Workman; DJ Bandz; DJ FMCT; Earl on the Beat; FnZ; Hakz; Haze; Isaiah Valmont; J Thrash; Jonah Little; James Maddocks; JULiA LEWiS; KblessOfficial; KD6; Lam; Lil Yachty; Lily Kaplan; Magic; Matty Michna; Metro Boomin; Neon; Oscar Zulu; RicoRunDat; Saint Mino; Smatt Sertified; STG2x; Southside; Thank You Fizzle; Too Dope; TouchofTrent; Vory; Will a Fool; Xclusivemadethis; Yegr

Lil Durk chronology
Nightmares in the Trenches (2023)	Deep Thoughts (2025)

Singles from Deep Thoughts
- 1. "Turn Up a Notch" Released: September 25, 2024; 2. "Monitoring Me" Released: October 4, 2024; 3. "Late Checkout" Released: October 11, 2024; 4. "Opportunist" Released: October 17, 2024; 5. "Can't Hide It" Released: March 21, 2025

Deep Thoughts is the ninth studio album by American rapper Lil Durk, released through Only the Family (OTF), Alamo Records, and Sony Music on March 28, 2025. The album features guest appearances from Future, Lil Baby, Hunxho, and Jhené Aiko. Production was handled by a variety of producers, including Southside, Chopsquad DJ, Metro Boomin, Lil Yachty, and Benny Blanco, among others. Deep Thoughts serves as the follow-up to Durk's previous album, Almost Healed, and his collaborative studio album with OTF, Nightmares in the Trenches (2023). The album was originally supposed to be released on October 18, 2024, but has since been delayed four times due to his October 2024 arrest on murder-for-hire charges.

Deep Thoughts was supported by five singles: "Turn Up a Notch", "Monitoring Me", "Late Checkout", "Opportunist" and "Can't Hide It". The album debuted at number three on US Billboard 200 chart, earning 64,000 album-equivalent units in its first week.

== Background and promotion ==
On December 11, 2023, Durk announced that he had begun working on his next album. On January 22, 2024, Durk announced that his next album would be Love Songs 4 the Streets 3. On February 23, Durk released the single "Old Days", followed by "Went Hollywood for a Year" on June 28.

On September 25, Durk released the album's lead single, "Turn Up a Notch". However, upon the release of the album's second single, "Monitoring Me" on October 4, a supposed tracklist for Love Songs 4 the Streets 3 was confirmed fake. Furthermore, Durk announced the release of the album alongside the release of the single.

On October 25, Durk was arrested along with five affiliates of his record label and collective Only the Family in connection to a murder-for-hire case targeted towards fellow American rapper and rival Quando Rondo; allegations suggest this was in retaliation for the murder of his close friend and collaborator King Von by one of Rondo's crew members. The arrest delayed the album's release date to 2025. Durk would officially declare on March 17, 2025, that the album's release date was set for March 28.

== Commercial performance ==
Deep Thoughts debuted at number three on US Billboard 200 chart, earning 64,000 album-equivalent units (including 1,000 copies in pure album sales) in its first week. This became Lil Durk's seventh US top ten debut on the chart. The album also accumulated a total of 85.92 million on-demand streams of the album's songs.

== Track listing ==
Deep Thoughts track listing
No.	Title	Writer(s)	Producer(s)	Length
1.	"Shaking When I Pray"	Durk Banks; Isaiah Valmont; Trenton Turner; Vincent Desrosiers	TouchofTrent; Desro; Valmont	3:02
2.	"Keep on Sippin'"	Banks; Joshua Luellen; Valmont; Turner; Nicolas Pohl	TouchofTrent; Neon; Valmont	3:01
3.	"They Want to Be You" (featuring Future)	Banks; Nayvadius Wilburn; Willie Byrd	Will a Fool	2:47
4.	"Soul Bleed"	Banks; John Lam; William Ramos; Alexander Norman	Lam; Brutei; Ayo Peewee	2:07
5.	"1000 Times" (featuring Lil Baby)	Banks; Dominique Jones; Traevon Walker; Jeremiah Thrasher; Braylen Rembert	Ayo Bleu; J Thrash; Xclusivemadethis	3:23
6.	"Turn Up a Notch"	Banks; Joshua Luellen; Matthew-Kyle Brown; Joe Talamo	Southside; Smatt Sertified; Oscar Zulu	2:21
7.	"Vanish Mode"	Banks; Darrell Jackson	Chopsquad DJ	2:03
8.	"Monitoring Me"	Banks; Luellen; Kevin Gomringer; Tim Gomringer; Thomas Crimeni; Lesidney Cheyenne Ragland; Lisimba Hazell	Southside; CuBeatz; T9C; TooDope; KblessOfficial	2:24
9.	"Untouchable"	Banks; Miles McCollum; Isaac Earl Bynum; Bennett Pepple	Earl on the Beat; Bangs; Lil Yachty	1:52
10.	"Notebook (No Hook)"	Banks; Lam; Ethan Hayes; James Maddocks	Lam; James Maddocks; Haze	2:33
11.	"Can't Hide It" (featuring Jhené Aiko)	Banks; Jhené Aiko Chilombo; Steven Shaeffer; Aidan Crotinger; Benjamin Levin; Hakan Akyol; Magnus Høiberg; Matty Michna; Mino Drerup	Crotinger; Benny Blanco; Cashmere Cat; Hakz; Michna; Saint Mino	2:42
12.	"Wonderin' Again"	Banks; Luellen; Rembert; Kadaivon Dixon	Southside; Ayo Bleu; KD6	2:08
13.	"Late Checkout" (featuring Hunxho)	Banks; Devin Workman; Mateen Niknam; Lily Kaplan; Maxwell Yeager; Tavoris Javon Hollis Jr.	AyoPeeb; Vory; Kaplan; Workman; Yegr	3:45
14.	"Think You Glowed"	Banks; Devonte Richmond; Kevin Da Silva; Maliki Decampos	DJ Bandz; DJ FMCT; RicoRunDat	2:55
15.	"Opportunist"	Banks; Devonte Richmond; Demetrises Bell Jr.; Jonah Little; Gabriel Kerr	DJ Bandz; Magic; STG2x; Jonah Little	2:36
16.	"Alhamdulilah"	Banks; Luellen; Brown; Ragland; Benjamin Falik; Joshua Goldenberg	Southside; Smatt Sertified; TooDope; JULiA LEWiS; Thank You Fizzle	2:38
17.	"Deep Depression"	Banks; Jahmal Gwin; Leland Wayne; Michael Mulé; Isaac de Boni	FnZ; BoogzDaBeast; Metro Boomin	2:49
Total length:				45:15

== Charts ==
=== Weekly charts ===
Weekly performance for Deep Thoughts
Chart (2025)	Peak position
Australian Hip Hop/R&B Albums (ARIA)	31
Belgian Albums (Ultratop Flanders)	160
Canadian Albums (Billboard)	24
Dutch Albums (Album Top 100)	42
Nigerian Albums (TurnTable)	12
Portuguese Albums (AFP)	168
Swiss Albums (Schweizer Hitparade)	99
UK Albums (Official Charts)	20
US Billboard 200	3
US Top R&B/Hip-Hop Albums (Billboard)	2

=== Year-end charts ===
Year-end chart performance for Deep Thoughts
Chart (2025)	Position
US Top R&B/Hip-Hop Albums (Billboard)	68
