= Like Me (Lil Durk song) =

Single by Lil Durk (2015)

Single by Lil Durk featuring Jeremih

from the album Remember My Name
- Released: March 31, 2015
- Genre: Hip hop; R&B
- Length: 3:58
- Label: Def Jam
- Songwriters: Durk Banks; Jeremih Felton; Anderson Hernandez; Matthew Samuels; Allen Ritter

Lil Durk singles chronology
"Dis Ain't What U Want" (2013)	"Like Me" (2015)	"What Your Life Like" (2015)

Jeremih singles chronology
"Planez" (2015)	"Like Me" (2015)	"Freak of the Week" (2015)

Music video
- "Like Me" on YouTube

"Like Me" is a song by the American rapper Lil Durk featuring the American singer Jeremih. It was released in the US on March 31, 2015, as the first single from the former's first studio album, Remember My Name (2015). The song was produced by Vinylz, Boi-1da and Allen Ritter and had a positive response from some critics. "Like Me" peaked at number 43 on the Billboard Hot R&B/Hip-Hop Songs chart. A music video directed by Eif Rivera was created for the single and released in April 2015.

== Background ==
The song premiered on March 24, 2015, and was released for digital download on March 31.

== Critical reception ==
"Like Me" received positive reviews from some music critics. Rick Florino of Artistdirect praised the vocal chemistry between Durk's no-frills, ear-grabbing lyrics and Jeremih's identifiable vocal tone throughout the song. Ernest Wilkins of Pitchfork praised Durk's use of Auto-Tune in his delivery of the song, calling it "a smooth entry into the pantheon of Sensitive Thug jams". Jake Jenkins of AbsolutePunk called it "a well executed R&B-leaning track" for its collaboration with Jeremih and exquisite use of Auto-Tune, writing that it "helps bring out some emotion in an otherwise, stoic, hard-shelled persona".

== Music video ==
The music video for the song was directed by Eif Rivera and released on April 20, 2015. The video follows Durk pursuing a romantic relationship with a woman but his actions in a craps game lead him to being set up. Intercut are scenes of Durk and Jeremih on a rooftop in Chicago.

== Remix ==
The official remix was released on September 5, 2015, and features the rappers Lil Wayne and Fetty Wap.

== Track listing ==
- Digital download (Explicit version)
1. "Like Me" (featuring Jeremih) – 3:58
- Digital download (Clean version)
1. "Like Me" (featuring Jeremih) – 3:58

== Charts ==
Chart (2015)	Peak position
US Bubbling Under Hot 100 Singles (Billboard)	9
US Hot R&B/Hip-Hop Songs (Billboard)	43

== Certifications ==
Region	Certification	Certified units/sales
United States (RIAA)	Gold	500,000^{‡}
^{‡} Sales+streaming figures based on certification alone.
