= Can't Hide It =

2025 single by Lil Durk featuring Jhené Aiko

Single by Lil Durk featuring Jhené Aiko

from the album Deep Thoughts
- Released: March 21, 2025
- Genre: R&B
- Length: 2:42
- Label: Only the Family; Alamo; Sony
- Songwriters: Durk Banks; Jhené Aiko Chilombo; Steven Shaeffer; Aidan Crotinger; Benjamin Levin; Magnus Høiberg; Hakan Akyol; Matty Michna; Mino Drerup
- Producers: Crotinger; Benny Blanco; Cashmere Cat; Hakz; Michna; Saint Mino

Lil Durk singles chronology
"Opportunist" (2025)	"Can't Hide It" (2025)

Jhené Aiko singles chronology
"Gorgeous" (2024)	"Can't Hide It" (2025)

"Can't Hide It" is a song by American rapper Lil Durk, released on March 21, 2025 as the fifth single from his ninth studio album, Deep Thoughts (2025). It features American singer Jhené Aiko. The song was produced by Aidan Crotinger, Benny Blanco, Cashmere Cat, Hakz, Matty Michna and Saint Mino.

== Composition ==
The song is an R&B ballad. It opens with dialogue from a short interview confirming that Lil Durk is married to his longtime girlfriend India Royale, before Durk details the ways that his fondness for her has influenced his behavior. Jhené Aiko sings the second verse, in which she delivers sexually suggestive lines and admits she cannot hide her affection for her partner.

== Critical reception ==
The song received generally positive reviews. Elias Andrews of HotNewHipHop stated "Lil Durk croons alongside Jhene Aiko for a song that is at once catchy and in line with the kind of stuff Durk has put out prior. It's not a blatant attempt at commercialism, it's a duet that feels honest to the overall vibe of Deep Thoughts. Jhene Aiko proves to be an inspired choice, bringing her typical vocal delicateness to the table on the chorus." Aaron Williams of Uproxx commented "The whole thing comes together nicely, with a relatively even balance of masculine and feminine, buttoned-up and slightly unhinged. It's a good song to continue the rollout for Durk’s upcoming album, Deep Thoughts." Mackenzie Cummings-Grady of Billboard placed the song at number 16 (second to last) in her ranking of the songs on Deep Thoughts, writing "it's not like 'Can't Hide It' is a bad song. Jhené came through and did her thing, which makes sense considering the beat sounds like something pulled straight out of her Souled Out era. However, it just doesn't quite fit the mood of the album. 'Can't Hide It' serves as one of the only light moments on Deep Thoughts, but listening to Durk croon about kissing toenails is slightly jarring after listeners spent 11 songs traversing the heavier themes on the album."

== Charts ==
=== Weekly charts ===
Weekly chart performance for "Can't Hide It"
Chart (2025)	Peak position
New Zealand Hot Singles (RMNZ)	21
US Billboard Hot 100	84
US Hot R&B/Hip-Hop Songs (Billboard)	24
US Rhythmic Airplay (Billboard)	10

=== Year-end charts ===
Year-end chart performance for "Can't Hide It"
Chart (2025)	Position
US Hot R&B/Hip-Hop Songs (Billboard)	83
US Rhythmic Airplay (Billboard)	49
