= Michael W. Fitzgerald =

American judge (born 1959)

Michael Fitzgerald
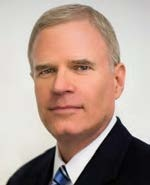

Judge of the United States District Court for the Central District of California
- Incumbent
- Assumed office March 15, 2012
- Appointed by: Barack Obama
- Preceded by: Howard Matz

Personal details
- Born: Michael Walter Fitzgerald; 1959 (age 66–67) Los Angeles, California, U.S.
- Education: Harvard University (BA); University of California, Berkeley (JD)

Michael Walter Fitzgerald (born in 1959) is a United States district judge of the United States District Court for the Central District of California.

== Early life and education ==
Fitzgerald was born in Los Angeles, California in 1959. He earned an Artium Baccalaureus from Harvard College in 1981 and a Juris Doctor from the University of California, Berkeley School of Law in 1985. From 1985 to 1986, Fitzgerald served as a law clerk for Judge Irving Kaufman of the United States Court of Appeals for the Second Circuit.

== Career ==
From 1988 to 1991, Fitzgerald was an assistant United States attorney for the Central District of California. Fitzgerald worked at Heller, Ehrman, White & McAuliffe from 1991 to 1995 and at the law offices of Robert L. Corbin from 1995 to 1998. From 1998, until his appointment to the Federal bench, Fitzgerald was part of a small Los Angeles law firm, Corbin, Fitzgerald & Athey, which handles white collar criminal defense and business litigation.

=== Federal judicial service ===
On July 20, 2011, President Barack Obama nominated Fitzgerald to serve as a United States district judge of the United States District Court for the Central District of California, he was nominated to the seat vacated by Judge Howard Matz. Fitzgerald is the fourth openly gay candidate nominated by Obama to a federal judgeship, after Edward DuMont, J. Paul Oetken, and Alison J. Nathan.

He received a hearing before the Senate Judiciary Committee on October 4, 2011, and the committee reported his nomination to the floor of the Senate on November 3, 2011, his nomination being placed on the Senate Executive Calendar that same day. On March 15, 2012, the Senate confirmed Fitzgerald by a 91–6 vote. He received his commission the same day.

Fitzgerald presides over the murder-for-hire and racketeering case for rapper Lil Durk and his co-defendants. Federal prosecutors first brought the case in October 2024. The murder-for-hire trial began on August 20, 2026. The trial concluded on September 11, 2026. Lil Durk was acquitted of all charges. Co-defendants Wilson and Lindsey were convicted of three lesser charges of stalking, but acquitted of murder-for-hire. The racketeering trial is scheduled to begin on October 5, 2026.

=== Notable ruling ===
In February 2018, Fitzgerald's ruling in Sean Hall and Nathan Butler's copyright lawsuit against Taylor Swift received international attention.

== Personal ==
Fitzgerald is openly gay and was the first openly LGBT person to be appointed to the federal bench in California.

== See also ==
- List of LGBT jurists in the United States

Legal offices
| Preceded by Howard Matz | Judge of the United States District Court for the Central District of California; 2012–present | Incumbent |
