= Stay Down (Lil Durk, 6lack and Young Thug song) =

2020 single by Lil Durk, 6lack and Young Thug

Single by Lil Durk, 6lack and Young Thug

from the album The Voice
- Released: October 30, 2020
- Genre: Melodic hip hop
- Length: 2:49
- Label: Only the Family; Alamo; Geffen
- Songwriters: Durk Banks; Ricardo Valentine, Jr.; Jeffery Williams; Dwan Avery; Leland Wayne
- Producers: DY; Metro Boomin

Lil Durk singles chronology
"U 2 Luv Remix" (2020)	"Stay Down" (2020)	"Back in Blood" (2020)

6lack singles chronology
"The Pink Phantom" (2020)	"Stay Down" (2020)	"You Ain't Worth It" (2020)

Young Thug singles chronology
"Jimmy Choo" (2020)	"Stay Down" (2020)	"Drunk Mess (Remix)" (2020)

Music video
- "Stay Down" on YouTube

"Stay Down" is a song by American musicians Lil Durk, 6lack, and Young Thug. It was released on October 30, 2020, as the second single from the former's sixth studio album, The Voice. The melodic track finds the artists melancholically detailing their quest for love and loyalty. The song was written by the artists alongside producers DY of 808 Mafia and Metro Boomin.

== Composition ==
"Stay Down" is a melancholic and melodic track, with the rappers delivering rhymes about their ladies' questionable motives, while making them understand their time and energy requires loyalty. The song "prioritizes sex and lots of money", with Durk referencing The Proud Family ("I gave you every Penny like Oscar"), and delivering non-English bars about how women of all cultures are welcome in his life. The chorus is performed by 6lack, who, as noted by Consequence of Sound's Wren Graves, "provides a sticky ear-worm chorus that starts with a pause and heats up with double- and triple-rhymes", while Young Thug closes out the song with a "bouncy, tongue-twisting flow that could almost have served as a second hook".

== Critical reception ==
Rap-Up noted how "Durk reflects on love while 6lack delivers the brooding chorus and Thugger adds a hypnotizing verse". Revolt's Jon Powell called it a "hard-hitting cut". Complex's Jordan Rose stated: "All three artists have become masters at being able to dip their hands into either a melodic, melancholy bag or, conversely, their hard hip-hop pockets and that skillset is made evident again here. While 6lack cruises over the beat with a more smooth, crooning sound, Thug and Durk are spitting about how loyalty and love are the perfect pairings". HipHopDX named "Stay Down" among the best hip hop songs of 2020, calling it an enjoyable track and praising 6lack for his "silky hook and verse on the track that stole the show".

== Music video ==
The song was released alongside a video directed by Collin Fletcher and Nick Vernet. It shows Lil Durk riding a hovercraft, with all three rappers later appearing in and around heavy duty trucks, performing their verses.

== Charts ==
Chart (2020–2021)	Peak position
Global 200 (Billboard)	154
Canada Hot 100 (Billboard)	94
New Zealand Hot Singles (RMNZ)	28
US Billboard Hot 100	73
US Hot R&B/Hip-Hop Songs (Billboard)	26
US Rhythmic Airplay (Billboard)	33
US Rolling Stone Top 100	65

== Certifications ==
Region	Certification	Certified units/sales
United States (RIAA)	Gold	500,000^{‡}
^{‡} Sales+streaming figures based on certification alone.
