= Backdoor (song) =

2020 single by Lil Durk

- Lil Durk wearing King Von's signature O'Block chain

Single by Lil Durk

from the album The Voice
- Released: December 21, 2020
- Genre: Hip hop
- Length: 3:20
- Label: Only the Family; Alamo; Geffen
- Songwriters: Durk Banks; Joshua Samuel; Malik Bynoe-Fisher; Braylen Rembert; Lachlan Gentle
- Producers: TurnMeUpJosh; MalikOTB; Ayo Bleu; Aura

Lil Durk singles chronology
"Help You Out" (2020)	"Backdoor" (2020)	"Hot Boy Bling" (2021)

Music video
- "Backdoor" on YouTube

"Backdoor" is a song by American rapper Lil Durk, from his sixth studio album, The Voice. It was released as the third single, on December 21, 2020, three days before the album. The song is a tribute to Durk's labelmate and friend, King Von, who was shot and killed outside an Atlanta nightclub in November 2020. The video sees Durk wearing Von's signature O'Block chain, which Von approved of before his death.

== Background ==
Lil Durk and King Von were frequent collaborators, starting with 2019's "Crazy Story" remix and "Twin Nem", and 2020's "All These Niggas", "Baguette's" and "Down Me". Both artists hail from Chicago's O'Block section. Von garnered notoriety through his affiliation with Durk. "Backdoor" honors Von who died in November 2020 at the age of 26 after being shot outside the Monaco Hookah Lounge in Atlanta following a reported argument. The shootout resulted in the deaths of Von, along with two other men. "Backdoor" was released following Durk's one-month social media hiatus. He promoted the song with the hashtag #DoIt4Von.

== Composition ==
Apart from the song being a tribute to King Von, it also sees Durk touch on his own personal struggles and cautioning on the dangers of running the streets. Over the piano-led instrumental, Durk references his success, fake love, and promises to make Von proud in the years to come.

== Critical reception ==
Billboard's Rania Aniftos deemed it a "stirring" song. The Fader's Jordan Darville noted the video for being "an appropriately melancholy sight for a song with disappointment and betrayal simmering beneath the flexing".

== Music video ==
The song's video accompanied its release. Directed by Jerry Production, it features a "subtle but touching" tribute to King Von. In the visual, Durk wears Von's signature O'Block chain, flaunting it in front of the camera. Prior to the song's release, Durk revealed in an Instagram Stories a text message conversation he and Von had, in which Durk informed Von that he would be filming the music video with the chain on that day, and Von replying that he will get it cleaned for him. Durk also sports the chain on the song's cover art. Furthermore in the video, he is also seen flaunting his riches, and pays tribute to his late cousin, OTF Nunu.

== Charts ==
Chart (2020–2021)	Peak position
Global 200 (Billboard)	148
US Billboard Hot 100	62
US Hot R&B/Hip-Hop Songs (Billboard)	18
US Rolling Stone Top 100	43

== Certifications ==
Region	Certification	Certified units/sales
United States (RIAA)	Platinum	1,000,000^{‡}
^{‡} Sales+streaming figures based on certification alone.
