= Lil Durk murder-for-hire trial =

Criminal trial in the United States

United States v. Grant
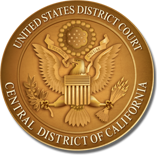
- Court: Central District of California
- Full case name: United States of America v. Durk Banks, Kavon London Grant, Deandre Dontrell Wilson, Keith Jones, David Brian Lindsey, and Asa Houston
- Submitted: October 17, 2024
- Started: August 20, 2026
- Decided: September 11, 2026
- Verdict: Banks: Not guilty on all (5) counts Wilson: Not guilty on Count (1), guilty on Counts (2), (3) and (5) Lindsey: Not guilty on Count (1), guilty on counts (2), (3) and (5)
- Charge: Conspiracy to commit stalking, stalking resulting in death, conspiring and use of interstate facilities to commit murder-for-hire resulting in death, possess, use, carry, and discharge firearms and machinegun in furtherance of, and during and in relation to, a crime of violence

Court membership
- Judge sitting: Michael W. Fitzgerald

The Durk murder-for-hire trial was a federal criminal trial in the United States District Court for the Central District of California. The trial involved American rapper Durk "Lil Durk" Banks and five associates from his record label, Only the Family (OTF). The trial stemmed from an August 2022 shooting death of Saviay'a "Lul Pab" Robinson, cousin of American rapper Tyquian "Quando Rondo" Bowman. Banks was arrested on October 25, 2024, one day after the arrest of five of his associates from OTF. The trial began on August 20, 2026.

Court documents allege that Banks conspired with his OTF associates to murder Bowman, and offered a monetary reward for his murder. They further allege that Banks used funds from himself and OTF-related ventures to finance the conspiracy. They also purport that Banks was involved with several murders and attempted murders, most notably the January 2022 murder of Stephon Mack, a member of the rival gang Gangster Disciples.

In June 2026, Banks and his associates were charged with violations of the Violent Crimes in Aid of Racketeering Activity (VICAR) statute, specifically murder in aid of racketeering. In the indictment, it alleges OTF was operated as a criminal enterprise, offering rewards of money and music opportunities in exchange for murdering rivals of Banks.

Banks' defense successfully filed a motion to sever the charges, moving the VICAR charges to a separate trial.

A jury acquitted Banks of all charges on September 11, 2026.

== Background ==
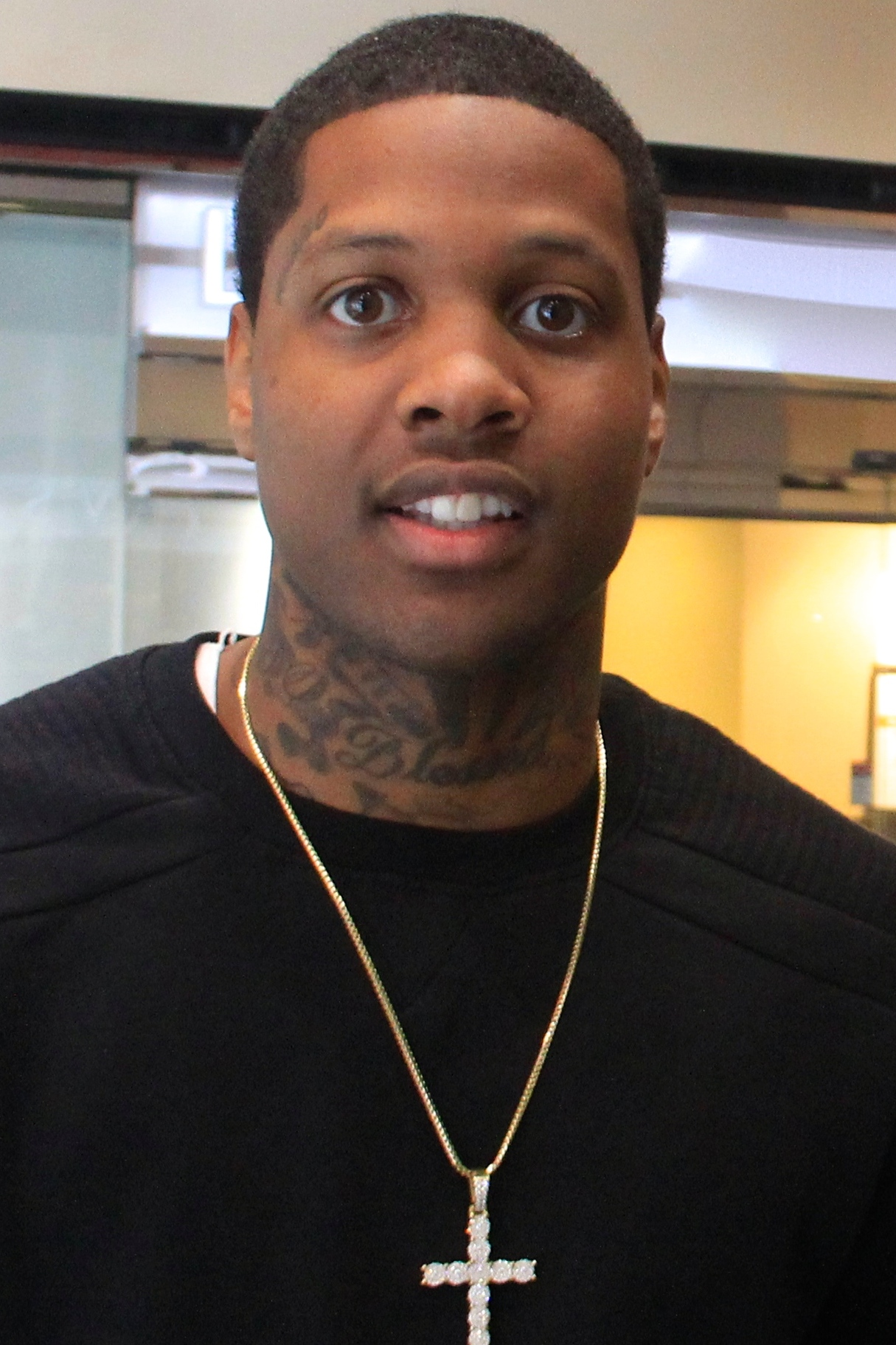
Banks in 2015.

=== Durk Banks ===
Durk Banks, also known by his stage name Lil Durk, is an American rapper based out of Englewood, Chicago. In 2010, he founded the record label Only the Family (OTF). Shortly after, he signed to the record label Def Jam Recordings. Banks was known by the Chicago Police Department as a member of the street gang Black Disciples.

In May 2019, Banks was arrested in connection with a February shooting at The Varsity restaurant in Atlanta. He was charged alongside his friend and fellow rapper Dayvon "King Von" Bennett for criminal intent to commit murder. Banks was seen on video firing at a man, Alexander Witherspoon, during an attempted robbery. Witherspoon was shot, with his vehicle and $30,000 in cash being stolen. He was treated for a gunshot wound to the leg but recovered. In October 2022, all charges were dropped against Banks.

=== Killing of King Von ===
On November 6, 2020, Dayvon "King Von" Bennett was shot and killed along with two others outside an Atlanta nightclub. The shooting began after a fight broke out between Bennett and fellow rapper Tyquian "Quando Rondo" Bowman. Shortly after the shooting, Timothy "Lul Tim" Leeks was charged with Bennett's death. In 2023, all charges against Leeks were dropped.

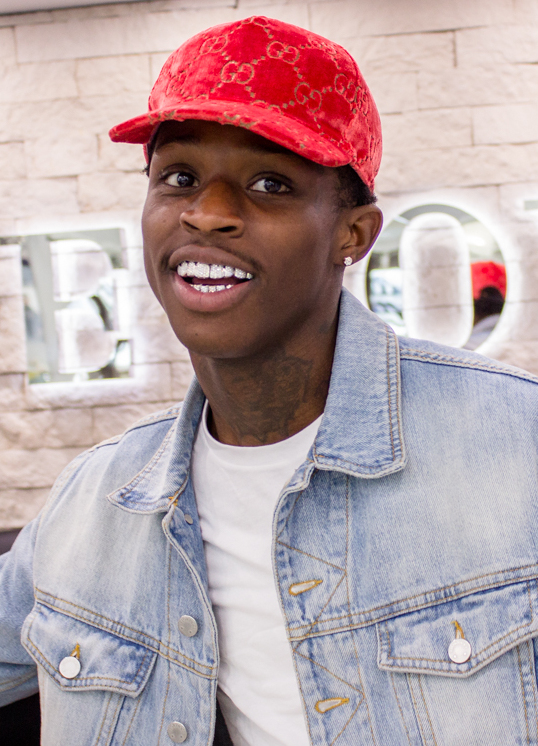
American rapper Quando Rondo was targeted in a shooting that killed his cousin, Saviay'a Robinson.

=== 2022 Los Angeles shooting ===
On August 19, 2022, several gunmen shot and killed Saviay'a "Lul Pab" Robinson, the cousin of Bowman, outside the Beverly Center in Los Angeles in a shooting targeting Bowman himself. Bowman's sister was also present at the time of the shooting. At least 18 rounds were fired at Bowman's vehicle.

Banks is alleged to have arranged the murder of Bowman in retaliation for the killing of Bennett. A close friend of Banks' paid for five of Banks' associates to travel from Chicago to California on August 18. Banks sent a text message to his friend, stating “Don’t book no flights under no names involved wit [sic] me.” Also on August 18, Banks and Kavon Grant traveled to California in a private jet. Grant later purchased ski masks and paid for a hotel room for the co-conspirators; the room was purchased with a credit card in Banks' name.

=== Murder of Stephon Mack ===
On January 27, 2022, Stephon Mack was murdered outside of the Youth Peace Center in Roseland, Chicago. Two suspects, Anthony Montgomery-Wilson and Preston Powell, were charged shortly after. Prosecutors alleged that both suspects killed Mack in a murder-for-hire plot. Mack was allegedly the leader of a faction of the rival gang Gangster Disciples.

During Banks' bond hearing in December 2024, prosecutors revealed an investigation into Banks alleging that Banks offered a reward in exchange for Mack's death. The plot stems from a June 2021 shooting where Banks' brother, Dontay "DThang" Banks, was shot and killed outside of a nightclub in Chicago. Banks allegedly offered money to kill anyone responsible with his brother's murder, with a warrant alleging that the Gangster Disciples were responsible. Prosecutors also linked one of Durk's songs, Ahhh Ha, to the murder of Mack.

== Pre-trial proceedings ==
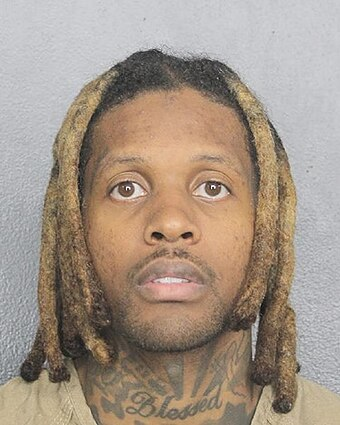
A mugshot of Banks after his arrest in Broward County.

=== Indictment ===
On October 24, 2024, five members of OTF were arrested: Kavon Grant, Deandre Wilson, Keith Jones, David Lindsey, and Asa Houston. Search warrants were also executed at various OTF locations. The five were indicted on four charges related to a murder-for-hire conspiracy. Separately, Banks was charged and arrested later that day near Miami International Airport after law enforcement discovered multiple international flights booked by Banks.

Banks was added to a superseding indictment on November 8, 2024. Banks pled not guilty on November 14, 2024, and a trial date was set for January 7, 2025. The trial was delayed until October 2025 after both parties agreed they needed more time to prepare and sift through discovery, which was upwards of 230 gigabytes of digital data and 20,000 pages of documents.

At a bond hearing in December, defense lawyers for Banks offered up a bond "secured by $2.3 million in equity in two homes in Georgia and $1 million in cash." Included in the offer was a security agency to guarantee the terms of a potential bond agreement would be met. The prosecutors cited Banks' music, the indictment against him, and the Stephon Mack murder. They also alleged that Banks continued to offer cash rewards for murders, including a witness in the trial. U.S. magistrate judge Patricia Donahue denied bond for Banks.

In April 2025, lawyers for Banks filed a motion to dismiss the indictment. The motion alleges that the government lied to the grand jury by supplying them with false evidence. They cited claims by the prosecution that Banks profited from lyrics about the murder during a feature in a Babyface Ray song, and used news clips about the shooting in the music video. Banks' lawyers claim that Banks wrote the lyrics seven months before the shooting, and the news clips were used in the music video produced by somebody unrelated to Banks. After the second superseding indictment, the judge denied the motion.

=== Second superseding indictment ===
On May 1, 2025, the prosecution introduced a second superseding indictment, charging all defendants with one count of stalking resulting in death. The indictment removed the references to Banks' lyrics. Following the subsequent arraignment, Banks' attorneys pushed again for bond with a $4.5 million package. The prosecution pointed to Banks' attempts to flee after he booked multiple international flights prior to his arrest near Miami International Airport. U.S. district judge Michael W. Fitzgerald denied the bond request, stating "no combination of conditions would reasonably assure that the Chicago rapper would show up for future court dates or reasonably assure the safety of any other person and the community."

In June 2025, prosecutors announced that they would not seek the death penalty. In September 2025, the trial was pushed back to January 20, 2026. The prosecution stated they needed more time due to the complexity of the case. All defendants but Banks agreed to the extension. In November 2025, Banks' defense team filed a motion to dismiss the case after the prosecution revealed threats made to U.S. Magistrate Judge Patricia Donahue and their own prosecution team. The prosecution revealed the threats in an effort to empanel an anonymous jury. The defense argued that Donahue had a conflict of interest when ruling on Banks' May 2025 bail hearing. In January 2026, the motion was denied.

=== Third superseding indictment and severance ===
In June 2026, two months before the August 20 trial date, prosecutors produced a third superseding indictment, charging Banks and his associates with violations of the Violent Crimes in Aid of Racketeering Activity (VICAR) statute. In the new indictment, prosecutors allege that Banks ran a criminal enterprise called the "Banks Gang Enterprise". They tie the Quando Rondo murder plot to the criminal enterprise, and charged all six with murder in aid of racketeering. They reference the 2019 Atlanta shooting and re-introduced the Stephon Mack murder.

Banks' lawyers filed a motion to either sever the charges, which would create a new trial on the introduced charges, or to dismiss the charges under the Speedy Trial Act. Shortly after, three defendants, Lindsey, Wilson, and Houston, filed a motion to sever themselves from the case and hold a separate trial; the latter sought to be separated entirely. On July 14, the judge granted the severance motion, separating the charges and ordering a new trial on the VICAR charges.

During a pre-trial hearing on August 13, the prosecution revealed they had 35 witnesses ready for trial, with 20 of those being key witnesses. The prosecution also alleged that the song "Pissed Me Off", released by Banks in 2021, showed intent to enact revenge on those responsible for Bennett's death. The defense argued that the song was an emotional response to the death of Banks' brother Dontay. The judge allowed the prosecution to use the music video as evidence.

== Trial proceedings ==
=== OTF Jam testimony ===
On August 26, Kacey "OTF Jam" Hester took the stand as a cooperating witness. Hester was identified by the authorities as one of the shooters in the Los Angeles shooting. Hester testified that he was a member of the Black Disciples, more specifically the "300 Lamron" faction of the gang. He met Banks in 2007 when Banks was 15. While Hester was in prison in 2012, Banks sent money to Hester's attorney while also depositing money into his prison account. After the death of Bennett in 2020, calls were made for Banks to retaliate, also known as "slide for Von."

During a session at an Atlanta studio, Hester recalled Banks threatening Leeks and Bowman's lives. Hester testified that on August 18, 2022, OTF Boonie Moe called Hester and informed him that he needed to go to San Diego with Co-Defendant Asa "OTF Boogie" Houston. When he got to San Diego, he was informed of the plot on Bowman's life. After collecting items, such as hoodies and ski masks, Kavon "OTF Vonnie" Grant procured the weapons. The group had originally intended on shooting Bowman outside a dispensary, but cancelled after realizing there was too much police presence.

He described the killing as "sloppy". He identified David Lindsey as the person who fired the first shots from a far distance. After a few seconds of shooting, they ran to a getaway car and sped off. He later identified Deandre "OTF DeDe" Wilson as being in the car while on the phone with Banks. Banks allegedly asked questions relating to the shooting. Though being offered a reward for the shooting, Hester recorded a track with Banks, after which he was given $10,000.

On August 27, Hester gave his reasoning for turning government witness. After being arrested for being in a car with a gun, Hester gave police a note stating, “I know about murder. I don’t wanna talk on camera, I know about a lot.” He stated that he felt bad that an innocent person was killed.

== See also ==
- YSL Records racketeering trial
