= Pelle Coat =

2023 single by Lil Durk

Single by Lil Durk

from the album Almost Healed
- Released: May 25, 2023
- Length: 4:13
- Label: Only the Family; Alamo; Sony
- Songwriters: Durk Banks; Darrell Jackson
- Producer: Chopsquad DJ

Lil Durk singles chronology
"All My Life" (2023)	"Pelle Coat" (2023)	"Stand by Me" (2023)

Music video
- "Pelle Coat" on YouTube

"Pelle Coat" is a song by American rapper Lil Durk. It was released through Only the Family, Alamo Records, and Sony Music as the second single from his eighth studio album, Almost Healed, on May 25, 2023. Durk wrote the song with producer Chopsquad DJ.

== Background ==
According to Durk's account, American rapper and fellow Chicagoan Kanye West was involved in production of the song and had a guest appearance, but it was cut, along with most of West's contributions to Almost Healed; the full extent of his involvement on the album is unknown. A snippet of West's original verse on "Pelle Coat" was leaked in 2024.

== Composition and lyrics ==
On "Pelle Coat", Durk raps about and pays tribute to people close to him that have died, including his artist, King Von, and his brother, DThang: "I send money to jails, I send money for funerals / Even though they goin' to hell for all them niggas they killed / You know I'm part of my brother 'nem forever ever, ever, I'm goin' to hell". He also talks about how his fans have been telling him on social media to get revenge on the people who killed the two and praying to God to help better his situation: "Mornin' time I get on my knees, I pray to Allah / Forgive me for the shit that I did / Let me get closer to my kids / Can you protect all my friends?"

== Music video ==
The official music video for "Pelle Coat", directed by Steve Cannon. premiered alongside the song on May 25, 2023, one day before the release of its parent album, Almost Healed. It stars Durk and Alicia Keys and is a combined music video for the song, as well as "Therapy Session", a collaboration with Keys and the song before on the album. Keys serves as Durk's therapist to listen to him talk about the emotional pain he feels from his loved ones dying although they are not physically in the same location. As the video transitions from "Therapy Session" to "Pelle Coat", it sees Durk walking through the streets of his hometown of Chicago, Illinois, and sees him walk past a mural of King Von and pray with his father in a mosque.

== Charts ==
Chart performance for "Pelle Coat"
Chart (2023)	Peak position
Canada Hot 100 (Billboard)	69
Global 200 (Billboard)	79
New Zealand Hot Singles (RMNZ)	16
UK Singles (OCC)	75
UK Hip Hop/R&B (OCC)	35
US Billboard Hot 100	35
US Hot R&B/Hip-Hop Songs (Billboard)	10

== Certifications ==
Certifications for "Pelle Coat"
Region	Certification	Certified units/sales
United States (RIAA)	Gold	500,000^{‡}
^{‡} Sales+streaming figures based on certification alone.
