= Monitoring Me =

2024 single by Lil Durk

Single by Lil Durk

from the album Deep Thoughts
- Released: October 4, 2024
- Genre: Gangsta rap; drill
- Length: 2:24
- Label: Only the Family; Alamo; Sony
- Songwriters: Durk Banks; Joshua Luellen; Kevin Gomringer; Tim Gomringer; Thomas Crimeni; Lesidney Ragland; Lisimba Hazell
- Producers: Southside: CuBeatz; T9C; TooDope; KblessOfficial

Lil Durk singles chronology
"Turn Up a Notch" (2024)	"Monitoring Me" (2024)	"Late Checkout" (2024)

Music video
- "Monitoring Me" on YouTube

"Monitoring Me" is a song by American rapper Lil Durk, released on October 4, 2024, as the second single from his ninth studio album, Deep Thoughts (2025). It was produced by Southside, CuBeatz, TooDope, T9C, and KblessOfficial.

== Composition ==
The production contains "ominous piano stabs" and "tinkling keys", over which Lil Durk criticizes his enemies for their dishonesty and raps about the activities of his crew on the streets of Chicago. He also mentions keeping some details secret, as it is possible someone is listening.

== Critical reception ==
Elias Andrews of HotNewHipHop gave a positive review, lauding the song for its "instrumental that amplifies his vocal timbre" and writing "The beat is simple in the best possible way." He additionally remarked, "The song manages the rare feat of being instantly catchy but decidedly gritty. Durk is so good at making trap anthems that he doesn't even need to worry about putting a commercial spin on it. 'Monitoring Me' is that good."

== Charts ==
Chart performance for "Monitoring Me"
Chart (2024–2025)	Peak position
US Bubbling Under Hot 100 (Billboard)	2
US Hot R&B/Hip-Hop Songs (Billboard)	32
