= Nightmares in the Trenches =

Compilation album by Lil Durk and Only the Family
- Released: November 17, 2023
- Genre: Drill
- Length: 30:25
- Label: Only the Family; Alamo; Sony
- Producer: Alek; BWolf201; BroskiBoi; Chopsquad DJ; Cicero; DJ Bandz; DotMidorii; ForeignGotEm; Judehproductions; JusVibes; Marqo; Noble; PradaShui; Robbo3AM; Wheezy

Lil Durk chronology
Almost Healed (2023)	Nightmares in the Trenches (2023)	Deep Thoughts (2025)

Only the Family chronology
Loyal Bros 2 (2022)	Nightmares in the Trenches (2023)

Singles from Nightmares in the Trenches
- 1. "Smurk Carter" Released: November 10, 2023

Nightmares in the Trenches is a collaborative compilation album by American rapper Lil Durk and his hip-hop group and record label, Only the Family. It was released through the label alongside Alamo Records (a subsidiary of Sony Music) on November 17, 2023. The album contains guest appearances from OTF Boonie Moe, Rob49, late rapper THF Zoo, Cokilla, Chief Wuk, Doodie Lo, YTB Fatt, Icewear Vezzo, Deeski, and Booka600. Production was handled by DotMidorii, Judehproductions, Wheezy, Marqo, BroskiBoi, Chopsquad DJ, PradaShui, Cicero, DJ Bandz, BrianWolf201, JusVibes, ForeignGotEm, Robbo3AM, Noble, and Alek. The album was supported by one single, "Smurk Carter", which was released alongside the official music video exactly a week before the album and debuted and peaked at number 95 on the Billboard Hot 100. Durk announced the project and shared its cover art and release date same day as the single and revealed the tracklist a few days later. The album was Lil Durk's last release before his incarceration by US marshals on October 25, 2024.

== Track listing ==
Nightmares in the Trenches track listing
No.	Title	Writer(s)	Producer(s)	Length
1.	"Nobody's Safe" (performed by OTF Boonie Moe, Rob49, and Only the Family)	Antonio Jones; Robert Thomas; Calvin Gillen; Yousef Judeh	DotMidorii; Judehproductions	3:20
2.	"Eyes Red"	Durk Banks; Wesley Glass	Wheezy	2:25
3.	"Posted At" (performed by THF Zoo, Cokilla, and Only the Family)	Devonsha Collier; Kevin Bass; Mikhail Kaniushkevich; Alexandr Smirnov	Marqo; BroskiBoi	2:00
4.	"Them Ones"	Banks; Darrell Jackson	Chopsquad DJ	1:45
5.	"I'm the Type" (with Chief Wuk)	Banks; Vontrell Voker	PradaShui	2:36
6.	"Last One" (performed by Doodie Lo, YTB Fatt, and Only the Family)	David Saulsberry; Rahshan Kyles; Devonte Richmond	Cicero; DJ Bandz	2:45
7.	"Fuck It" (with Icewear Vezzo)	Banks; Chivez Smith; Brian Wolf	BWolf201	2:59
8.	"Hood Said"	Banks; Justin Gibson; Vid Vucenovic	JusVibes; ForeignGotEm	3:01
9.	"Whatever You Wit" (performed by Cokilla, Deeski, and Only the Family)	Bass; Deandre Wilson; Jackson	Chopsquad DJ	3:15
10.	"It's on Me" (performed by Booka600 and Only the Family)	Darontez Mayo; Robert Holloway, Jr.; Gavin Wallace; Aleksander Helmuth	Robbo3AM; Noble; Alek	2:38
11.	"Smurk Carter"	Banks; Jackson	Chopsquad DJ	3:37
Total length:				30:25

== Charts ==
Chart performance for Nightmares in the Trenches
Chart (2023)	Peak position
US Billboard 200	114
US Top R&B/Hip-Hop Albums (Billboard)	40
