= Life Ain't No Joke =

Mixtape by Lil Durk
- Released: October 19, 2012
- Recorded: 2012
- Genre: Hip hop; drill
- Length: 52:55
- Label: OTF

Lil Durk chronology
I'm Still a Hitta (2012)	Life Ain't No Joke (2012)	Signed to the Streets (2013)

Life Ain't No Joke is the 3rd mixtape by American rapper Lil Durk; hosted by DJ Moondawg and DJ Victoriouz. It was released on October 19, 2012, by his independent record label OTF. The release of this mixtape coincides with his 20th birthday. The mixtape features guest appearances from French Montana, Soulja Boy, and Yo Gotti. As of October 31, 2022, the mixtape has been downloaded over 259,000 times on DatPiff and is certified platinum.

== Reception ==
Pitchfork Media's Jordan Sargent noted that Lil Durk, unlike fellow Chicago rappers Chief Keef and Lil Reese, "leans heavily on one under-discussed aspect of drill music: Autotune, and drowning music in it." Sargent remarked that several songs on the mixtape make use of the effect "to no real positive outcome", with the exceptions of "Right Here" and, in particular, "Molly Girl", which he called "one of the tape's clear highlights." In an interview with The Morning News, Durk said that singing on such tracks as "Molly Girl" makes him more versatile than the average rapper. "I think I can switch up any type of genre song," he says. "If I knew about country, I can make a country song." Corban Goble of Stereogum wrote: "Life Ain’t No Joke is a great title for this set of songs; while there’s this urgency instilled in these teenagers by the dire circumstances of their upbringing, the threat of falling in with the wrong people and finding yourself at the front end of a life sentence always looms above them."

== Track listing ==
No.	Title	Writer(s)	Length
1.	"(Intro) 52 Bars"	Durk D. Banks	3:13
2.	"Dem Niggaz"	Banks	3:08
3.	"Right Here"	Banks	3:56
4.	"Action"	Banks	3:40
5.	"Molly Girl"	Banks	3:27
6.	"I'm On"	Banks	3:28
7.	"Rydah"	Banks	3:18
8.	"Disappearing"	Banks	3:42
9.	"Fuck 'Em" (featuring French Montana)	Banks, Kharim Kharbouch	4:40
10.	"Days Of Our Lives"	Banks	3:13
11.	"Animal"	Banks	3:02
12.	"Homicide"	Banks	3:20
13.	"Eater (Remix)" (featuring Soulja Boy)	Banks, DeAndre Way	3:40
14.	"All White" (featuring Yo Gotti)	Banks, Mario Mims	3:38
15.	"Life Ain't No Joke"	Banks	3:32
Total length:			50:17
