= The Voice (Lil Durk song) =

2020 single by Lil Durk

Single by Lil Durk

from the album The Voice
- Released: September 4, 2020
- Genre: Hip hop
- Length: 2:59
- Label: Only the Family; Alamo; Geffen
- Songwriters: Durk Banks; Joshua Samuel; John Balan; Braylen Rembert; Daiki Ishii
- Producers: Turn Me Up Josh; LowLowTurnMeUp; Ayo Bleu; Trill Dynasty

Lil Durk singles chronology
| "Eat (Remix)" (2020) | "The Voice" (2020) | "Same Hands" (2020) |

Music video
- "The Voice" on YouTube

"The Voice" is a song by American rapper Lil Durk. It was released as the lead single from his sixth studio album of the same name on September 4, 2020. The song was produced by Turn Me Up Josh, LowLowTurnMeUp, Ayo Bleu, and Trill Dynasty.

== Background and composition ==
On August 28, 2020, Lil Durk announced the song's release date.

Instruments in the production of the song include piano, "sleek drum programming", electric guitar riff and organ. Durk melodically recounts his rough times in the past, such as his old life in the streets and living in quarantine. He also states his confidence in the rap game, calling himself "Chicago Jay-Z".

== Award ==
On November 12, 2021, Japanese producer Trill Dynasty was selected as one of the recipients of the 2021 Ibaraki Prefectural Governor's Award for his contributions to "The Voice" and he became the first Japanese artist to reach number one on the Billboard Top R&B/Hip-Hop Albums chart.

== Charts ==
| Chart (2020) | Peak position |
|---|---|
| Global 200 (Billboard) | 99 |
| US Billboard Hot 100 | 62 |
| US Hot R&B/Hip-Hop Songs (Billboard) | 22 |

== Certifications ==
| Region | Certification | Certified units/sales |
|---|---|---|
| United States (RIAA) | Platinum | 1,000,000^{‡} |
^{‡} Sales+streaming figures based on certification alone.
