= Smurk Carter =

2023 single by Lil Durk and Only the Family

Single by Lil Durk and Only the Family

from the album Nightmares in the Trenches
- Released: November 10, 2023
- Genre: Hip Hop
- Length: 3:37
- Label: Only the Family; Empire
- Songwriters: Durk Banks; Darrel Jackson
- Producer: Chopsquad DJ

Lil Durk singles chronology
"Big FU" (2023)	"Smurk Carter" (2023)	"Vultures" (2023)

Only the Family singles chronology
"Pistol Tottin" (2021)	"Smurk Carter" (2023)

Music video
- "Smurk Carter" on YouTube

"Smurk Carter" is a song by American rapper Lil Durk and his record label Only the Family. It was released through the label alongside Empire Distribution as the lead and only single from their collaborative compilation album, Nightmares in the Trenches, on November 10, 2023. Durk wrote the song with producer Chopsquad DJ and the official music video was released on the same day.

== Background ==
A few days before the song was released, Lil Durk previewed it among other tracks at a SiriusXM + Pandora Playback event in Atlanta. According to Durk, the song was inspired by rappers Lil Wayne and Jay-Z. The title of the song references Wayne's surname, Carter, and cover art of the single features Lil Durk adorning Wayne's iconic face tattoos.

== Composition ==
The song opens with a speech about second chances in life from Robert Shipp, a Chicago man who was sentenced to life in prison for his alleged involvement in a drug conspiracy but reformed and was released after decades. It finds Lil Durk adopting a flow which is similar to that of Lil Wayne's classic style and rapping about street life.

== Music video ==
An official music video was released alongside the single. Directed by Jerry Production, it begins with an appearance from Shipp, who delivers his monologue. The clip sees Lil Durk and his crew in different locations and contains numerous references to Lil Wayne's early career, mainly his "Hustler Musik" video, showing Durk wearing the same BAPE outfits and recreating several rooftop scenes. Other references include the video to Wayne's song "Tha Block Is Hot".

== Charts ==
Chart performance for "Smurk Carter"
Chart (2023)	Peak position
US Billboard Hot 100	95
US Hot R&B/Hip-Hop Songs (Billboard)	24
