= Almost Healed =

Studio album by Lil Durk (2023)

Studio album by Lil Durk
- Released: May 26, 2023
- Recorded: 2022 – April 2023
- Genres: Hip-hop; drill
- Length: 56:35
- Labels: Only the Family; Alamo; Sony
- Producers: 7ink; AK; Alicia Keys; ATL Jacob; B3 Productions; Charlie Handsome; Chopsquad DJ; Cloud; Crevm Dian; Cubeatz; Destro; Dr. Luke; Emzy; Ghostrage; Haze; Hendrix Smoke; Indiyah; Inuya; John Lam; Juke Wong; Jusvibes; LilJuMadeDaBeat; LMC; Looisey; LowLowTurnThatUp; Lufye; Major Seven; Metro Boomin; Paul Monstereal; Quis; RunItUpNick; Ryderoncrack; Smatt Sertified; Southside; Square; T99; Touch of Trent; Wheezy; Yeahthismoh; Zaytoven

Lil Durk chronology
Loyal Bros 2 (2022)	Almost Healed (2023)	Nightmares in the Trenches (2023)

Singles from Almost Healed
- 1. "All My Life" Released: May 12, 2023; 2. "Pelle Coat" Released: May 25, 2023; 3. "Stand by Me" Released: July 14, 2023

Almost Healed is the eighth studio album by American rapper Lil Durk. It was released through Only the Family, Alamo Records, and Sony Music on May 26, 2023. The album features guest appearances from Alicia Keys, J. Cole, Chief Wuk, Future, 21 Savage, Kodak Black, Rob49, Morgan Wallen, and Juice WRLD. Production was handled by Alicia Keys herself, Chopsquad DJ, Dr. Luke, ATL Jacob, Hendrix Smoke, Ghostrage, Touch of Trent, Haze, Southside, Smatt Sertified, Looisey, Desro, Metro Boomin, T99, Ryderoncrack, LMC, Cloud, Zaytoven, Wheezy, Juke Wong, LilJuMadeDaBeat, Cubeatz, B3 Productions, 7ink, Square, Quis, Inuya, Major Seven, Emzy, Charlie Handsome, LowLowTurnThatUp, Paul Monstereal, Crevm Dian, Jusvibes, RunItUpNick, Indiyah, Yeahthismoh, John Lam, Lufye, and AK. Almost Healed is a drill album.

== Background and singles ==
Up until May 2023, the album was known under the title The Voice 2.0, a sequel to Durk's sixth studio album, The Voice (2020), which he began teasing in January 2023. In an interview with XXL, Durk shared that recording is part of what helps him cope with stress and the recent loss of his brother, also revealing that he goes to therapy. In return, he wanted to give his fans "therapy" by releasing the album soon, as he revealed in an interview with Billboard. He referred to the record as "the biggest album ever" regarding all the things going on in his life at that point. On April 13, 2023, he announced that he had just finished the album without "half the help" he had been asking for, alluding to the album title "almost healed". That same day, he asked his followers to reach out to SZA as he wanted her to be featured on the album. During that time, the album was still titled The Voice 2.0, the "2.0" implying personal growth since the prequel. On May 12, 2023, the lead single of the album, "All My Life", which features fellow American rapper J. Cole was released, and the two were spotted with a group of children filming the official music video exactly ten days before. The song was released on May 12, the formerly announced release date of the album. Meanwhile, Almost Healed was pushed back to May 26. On May 22, the production credits were revealed, followed by the full tracklist the next day. The second single of the album, "Pelle Coat", was released on May 25, 2023, one day before the release of the album, alongside the official music video that stars Durk and Alicia Keys and is a combined video of that song and the collaboration with Keys, "Therapy Session", which appears as a promotional single and the song before on the album. The third and final single of the album, "Stand by Me", which features American country music singer Morgan Wallen, was sent to US radio crossover on July 14, 2023.

== Artwork ==
On May 2, 2023, Durk promised to reveal the details about his next album if the post reached 100,000 comments. After having received said amount, the rapper posted the release date and cover, the latter of which depicted a black and white photograph showing Durk surrounded by blurry figures. Shortly afterwards, the cover was replaced by a picture of Durk with his head wrapped in a bandage and blood dripping out of his right eye with a white overlay.

== Critical reception ==
Professional ratings
Aggregate scores
Source	Rating
Metacritic	60/100
Review scores
Source	Rating
Pitchfork	6.3/10
Clash	7/10
Slant Magazine	3/5 stars
Rolling Stone	70/100
HipHopDX	60/100
AllMusic	2.5/5 stars

According to the review aggregator Metacritic, Almost Healed received "mixed or average reviews" based on a weighted average score of 60 out of 100 from 6 critic scores. Dylan Green of Pitchfork felt that Almost Healed lacked cohesiveness, explaining that "it never knows what kind of experience it wants to deliver" and "Durk's presence is strong and his endurance is inspiring, but his intentions are as muddied as ever". Writing for Clash, Robin Murray praised the album's themes writing: "Music, as ever, became a point of solace – new album 'Almost Healed' is explicitly dubbed an act of therapy, and it's the sound of someone getting a lot off their chest." Paul Attard, of Slant Magazine, also praised the album's themes but criticized a lack of consistency throughout the album stating: "It's admirable that an artist of Durk's popularity is willing to rap about topics such as generational trauma and structural violence on tracks like the well-meaning, if suffocatingly sappy, "All My Life." And while the authenticity of his verses is bolstered by the vivid details he peppers throughout, like seeing blood from a miscarriage in the toilet on "Sad Songs," it's also a little off-putting to then hear him threatening to "pull up with a stick" on "Big Dawg." Humans are complicated, contradictory beings, but there's an almost jarring disconnect on Almost Healed given how quickly and brazenly Durk flips the script." HipHopDX's Louis Pavlakos criticized the guest features on the album stating, "Durk's insistence on making radio friendly tracks includes another lackluster team up for pop crossover. The Morgan Wallen-assisted 'Stand by Me' reeks of desperation from a man seeking approval from people who don't respect Hip Hop."

== Commercial performance ==
Almost Healed debuted at number three on US Billboard 200 chart, earning 125,000 album-equivalent units (including 2,000 in pure album sales) in its first week. This became Lil Durk's sixth top ten album on the chart. The album also accumulated a total of 167.82 million on-demand streams of the album's songs. In its second week, the album dropped to number six on the chart, earning an additional 67,000 units. In its third week, the album dropped to number seven on the chart, earning 50,000 more units. In its fourth week, the album dropped to number eight on the chart, earning 41,000 units, bringing its four-week total to 283,000 units. On March 27, 2025, the album was certified platinum by the Recording Industry Association of America (RIAA) for combined sales and album-equivalent units of over one million units in the United States.

== Track listing ==
Almost Healed track listing
No.	Title	Writer(s)	Producer(s)	Length
1.	"Therapy Session" (with Alicia Keys)	Alicia Cook	Alicia Keys	1:27
2.	"Pelle Coat"	Durk Banks; Darrell Jackson	Chopsquad DJ	4:13
3.	"All My Life" (featuring J. Cole)	Banks; Jermaine Cole; Łukasz Gottwald; Rocco Valdes; Ryan Ogren; Gamal Lewis; Theron Thomas	Dr. Luke	3:43
4.	"Never Again"	Banks; Jackson	Chopsquad DJ	2:19
5.	"Put Em on Ice"	Banks; Jackson	Chopsquad DJ	2:03
6.	"Big Dawg" (with Chief Wuk)	Banks; Vontrell Voker; Jacob Canady; Derrick Miller	ATL Jacob; Hendrix Smoke	2:40
7.	"Never Imagined" (featuring Future)	Banks; Nayvadius Wilburn; Jackson; Chandler Ingram	Chopsquad DJ; Ghostrage	3:12
8.	"Sad Songs"	Banks; Darontez Mayo; Trenton Turner; Ethan Hayes	Touch of Trent; Haze	2:36
9.	"Before Fajr"	Banks; Joshua Luellen; Matthew-Kyle Brown; Vincent Desrosiers; Luis Díaz	Southside; Smatt Sertified; Desro; Looisey	2:00
10.	"War Bout It" (featuring 21 Savage)	Banks; Shéyaa Abraham-Joseph; Leland Wayne	Metro Boomin	2:40
11.	"You Got Em"	Banks; Ryder Bucaro; Liam McAlister; Aaron Tanarasoo; Indyah McAlister; Marian Pfaff	T99; Ryderoncrack; LMC; Cloud; Indyah	2:22
12.	"Grandson" (featuring Kodak Black)	Banks; Bill Kapri; Xavier Dotson; Wayne	Zaytoven; Metro Boomin	2:20
13.	"300 Urus"	Banks; Wesley Glass; Lucas DePante	Wheezy; Juke Wong	3:24
14.	"Same Side" (featuring Rob49)	Banks; Robert Thomas; Julian Mason; Tim Gomringer; Kevin Gomringer; Alfredo Matteucci; Giuseppe Federico; Stanley Link; Eric Sandavol; Rodrick Moore	LilJuMadeDaBeat; Cubeatz; B3 Productions; 7ink; Square	2:33
15.	"B12"	Banks; Bucaro; Marquise Williams; Joaquin Bergalo	Ryderoncrack; Quis; Inuya	2:43
16.	"At This Point We Stuck"	Banks; Canady; Omar Walker; Kester Wakahenya Githaiga	ATL Jacob; Major Seven; Emzy	1:54
17.	"Cross the Globe" (featuring Juice WRLD)	Banks; Jarad Higgins; Ryan Vojtesak; Glass	Charlie Handsome; Wheezy	2:04
18.	"Dru Hill"	Banks; John Balan; Virga Paul-Emanuel; Yoosno Bin Jafar Siddik; Justin Gibson; William Ramos	LowLowTurnThatUp; Paul Monstereal; Crevm Dian; Aye Peewee; Jusvibes	2:55
19.	"Belt2Ass"	Banks; I. McAlister; L. McAlister; Mohammed Al-Khuzahi; Nicholas Morris	RunItUpNick; Indyah; LMC; Yeahthismoh	2:39
20.	"Stand by Me" (featuring Morgan Wallen)	Banks; Morgan Wallen; Gottwald; Ernest Smith; Jacob Durrett; Valdes; Ogren; Lewis; Vojtesak	Dr. Luke	3:39
21.	"Moment of Truth"	Banks; John Lam; Andreas Krivic; Luca Steinkirchner	Lam; Lufye; AK	2:59
Total length:				56:25

Notes

- "Sad Songs" features additional vocals from Booka600

== Charts ==
=== Weekly charts ===
Weekly chart performance for Almost Healed
Chart (2023)	Peak position
Australian Albums (ARIA)	32
Austrian Albums (Ö3 Austria)	54
Belgian Albums (Ultratop Flanders)	56
Belgian Albums (Ultratop Wallonia)	148
Canadian Albums (Billboard)	3
Dutch Albums (Album Top 100)	12
French Albums (SNEP)	84
German Albums (Offizielle Top 100)	81
Irish Albums (Official Charts)	49
Italian Albums (FIMI)	82
Lithuanian Albums (AGATA)	75
New Zealand Albums (RMNZ)	13
Norwegian Albums (VG-lista)	10
Swedish Albums (Sverigetopplistan)	48
Swiss Albums (Schweizer Hitparade)	24
UK Albums (Official Charts)	12
UK R&B Albums (Official Charts)	38
US Billboard 200	3
US Top R&B/Hip-Hop Albums (Billboard)	1

=== Year-end charts ===
2023 year-end chart performance for Almost Healed
Chart (2023)	Position
US Billboard 200	62
US Top R&B/Hip-Hop Albums (Billboard)	23

2024 year-end chart performance for Almost Healed
Chart (2024)	Position
US Top R&B/Hip-Hop Albums (Billboard)	82

== Certifications ==
Certifications for "Almost Healed"
Region	Certification	Certified units/sales
Canada (Music Canada)	Gold	40,000^{‡}
New Zealand (RMNZ)	Gold	7,500^{‡}
United States (RIAA)	Platinum	1,000,000^{‡}
^{‡} Sales+streaming figures based on certification alone.
