= All My Life (Lil Durk song) =

2023 single by Lil Durk featuring J. Cole

- Remixes cover

Single by Lil Durk featuring J. Cole

from the album Almost Healed
- Released: May 12, 2023
- Genre: Political hip-hop; trap
- Length: 3:45
- Label: Only the Family; Alamo; Sony
- Songwriters: Durk Banks; Jermaine Cole; Łukasz Gottwald; Rocco Valdes; Ryan Ogren; Gamal Lewis; Theron Thomas
- Producer: Dr. Luke

Lil Durk singles chronology
"Shoot Who" (2023)	"All My Life" (2023)	"Pelle Coat" (2023)

J. Cole singles chronology
"On the Street" (2023)	"All My Life" (2023)	"Passport Boys" (2023)

Music video
- "All My Life" on YouTube

"All My Life" is a song by American rapper Lil Durk featuring fellow American rapper J. Cole. It was released through Only the Family, Alamo Records, and Sony Music as the lead single from the former's eighth studio album, Almost Healed, on May 12, 2023. It was written alongside Rocco Did It Again!, Ryan Ogren, LunchMoney Lewis, Theron Thomas of R. City, and producer Dr. Luke. It features uncredited vocals from the young choir.

On October 13, 2023, two remixes of the song were released, respectively with Burna Boy and Stray Kids; the latter omits J. Cole. The song won Best Melodic Rap Performance at the 66th Annual Grammy Awards, making it Durk's first Grammy and J. Cole's second.

== Background ==
On April 20, 2023, in an interview with XXL, Durk talked about the song and his collaboration with Cole on it:

Definitely got J. Cole on "All My Life." It's just a rap that's just showing you what I been going through. What I been doing lately. Trying to change how I am. Dr. Luke produced it. We were just trying to figure out like what's the right person to put on it. 'Cause it's one of those songs where if it's not the right person to do the second verse... I feel like Cole can bring the energy that I'm looking for to it. So, if it wasn't J. Cole, it'd be [Kanye], but Ye, he tucked away somewhere.

On the same day that the song was released, Durk was interviewed live by Complex, in which he talked about working with Cole, in which he felt that "he smoked my ass on that one, for one — barely" and added that "that barely happens". Exactly ten days before its release, Durk posted a video that Cole took of them while shooting its music video, in which they were accompanied by children singing the chorus, which is what it is on the official version.

== Composition and lyrics ==
"All My Life" sees Durk trade his usual energetic drill style for more introspective production, which was considered a departure from his regular style of music, and contains the vocals of a young choir as he raps about the criticism that he has faced: "I decided I had to finish, but the media called me a menace / I done sat with the mayor and politicians, I'm tryna change the image / You can't blame my past no more, I come from the trenches". He raps about social and community changes as he touches on abusing drugs, paying child support, and children wanting to cause self-harm, speaking on what he has lately been trying to do to help the world change for the better. Cole raps about young rappers dying before they reach a big level of fame in his verse.

== Music video ==
The official music video for "All My Life", directed by Steve Cannon, was released alongside the song on May 12, 2023. It sees Durk and Cole with a choir of children singing the chorus of the song. The two artists stand on a porch and dance in a yard, as well as play catch with some of the children.

== Track listing ==
Digital download and streaming

No.	Title	Length
1.	"All My Life" (featuring J. Cole)	3:43

Digital download and streaming – remixes EP

No.	Title	Length
1.	"All My Life" (with J. Cole featuring Burna Boy)	4:24
2.	"All My Life" (featuring Stray Kids)	3:37
3.	"All My Life" (featuring J. Cole)	3:43
Total length:		11:44

== Charts ==
=== Weekly charts ===
Weekly chart performance for "All My Life"
Chart (2023–2024)	Peak position
Australia (ARIA)	9
Australia Hip Hop/R&B (ARIA)	4
Canada Hot 100 (Billboard)	8
Germany (GfK)	97
Global 200 (Billboard)	7
Ireland (IRMA)	22
Japan Hot Overseas (Billboard Japan)	5
Lithuania (AGATA)	88
Netherlands (Single Top 100)	73
New Zealand (Recorded Music NZ)	10
Nigeria Top 100 (TurnTable)	11
Nigeria Hip-Hop/Rap Songs (TurnTable)	1
Portugal (AFP)	184
Russia Airplay (TopHit)	33
South Africa Streaming (TOSAC)	2
Sweden (Sverigetopplistan)	73
Switzerland (Schweizer Hitparade)	69
UK Singles (Official Charts)	14
UK Hip Hop/R&B (Official Charts)	4
US Billboard Hot 100	2
US Adult Pop Airplay (Billboard)	38
US Hot R&B/Hip-Hop Songs (Billboard)	1
US Pop Airplay (Billboard)	9
US Rhythmic Airplay (Billboard)	1

=== Monthly charts ===
Monthly chart performance for "All My Life"
Chart (2023)	Peak position
Russia Airplay (TopHit)	36

=== Year-end charts ===
Year-end chart performance for "All My Life"
Chart (2023)	Position
Canada (Canadian Hot 100)	49
Global 200 (Billboard)	110
Russia Airplay (TopHit)	82
US Billboard Hot 100	25
US Hot R&B/Hip-Hop Songs (Billboard)	8
US Mainstream Top 40 (Billboard)	36
US Rhythmic (Billboard)	8

== Certifications ==
Certifications for "All My Life"
Region	Certification	Certified units/sales
Australia (ARIA)	Platinum	70,000^{‡}
Brazil (Pro-Música Brasil)	Gold	20,000^{‡}
Canada (Music Canada)	3× Platinum	240,000^{‡}
New Zealand (RMNZ)	Platinum	30,000^{‡}
Nigeria (TCSN)	Platinum	100,000^{‡}
United Kingdom (BPI)	Gold	400,000^{‡}
United States (RIAA)	4× Platinum	4,000,000^{‡}
^{‡} Sales+streaming figures based on certification alone.

== Release history ==
"All My Life" release history
Region	Date	Format(s)	Version	Label(s)	Ref.
Various	May 12, 2023	Digital download; streaming	Original	Only the Family; Alamo; Sony	
United States	May 30, 2023	Contemporary hit radio	Original	Alamo	
Various	October 13, 2023	Digital download; streaming	Remixes	Only the Family; Alamo; Sony	
