= Remember My Name (album) =

Studio album by Lil Durk (2015)

Studio album by Lil Durk
- Released: June 2, 2015
- Recorded: 2014–15
- Genre: Hip hop; drill
- Length: 41:11
- Label: Only the Family; Def Jam
- Producer: Allen Ritter; Boi-1da; B Wheezy; C-Sick; DJ L; D Brooks Exclusive; FKi; London on da Track; Metro Boomin; Vinylz; Young Chop

Lil Durk chronology
| Signed to the Streets 2 (2014) | Remember My Name (2015) | Lil Durk 2X (2016) |

Deluxe edition cover

Singles from Remember My Name
- 1. "Like Me" Released: March 31, 2015

Remember My Name is the debut studio album by American rapper Lil Durk. It was released on June 2, 2015, by Only the Family and Def Jam Recordings. The album's production was handled by C-Sick, DJ L, FKi, London on da Track, Metro Boomin, Vinylz, Young Chop and more, with fellow Def Jam label-mates Jeremih and Logic were the featured artists. The album garnered a positive reception but critics were mixed on the gangsta rap content and Auto-Tune delivery of them. Remember My Name debuted at number 14 on the Billboard 200 and only released one single: "Like Me". The deluxe edition adds appearances from Hypno Carlito and King Popo.

== Critical reception ==
Professional ratings
Aggregate scores
| Source | Rating |
|---|---|
| Metacritic | 61/100 |
Review scores
| Source | Rating |
| AbsolutePunk | (50%) |
| AllMusic | 3/5 stars |
| Billboard | 3/5 stars |
| Complex | 2.5/5 stars |
| Consequence | C+ |
| HipHopDX | 3/5 stars |
| Pitchfork | 5.6/10.0 |
| Rolling Stone | 3.5/5 stars |

Remember My Name received generally positive reviews from music critics but were divided on Durk's Auto-Tune flow and lyrical content. At Metacritic, which assigns a normalized rating out of 100 to reviews from critics, the album received an average score of 61, based on 8 reviews.

David Turner from Rolling Stone praised Durk for maintaining a delivery of dark ghetto lyrics over a mainstream budget, concluding that "He's nowhere near forgetting how hard times were for him, and remain for so many in his hometown." Meaghan Garvey of Billboard praised the album for being able to "strike a graceful balance between gritty roots and big-budget sheen, recruiting underrated drill producers (DJ L, C-Sick) whose slick beats are highlights." AllMusic's David Jeffries said that despite retreads of "Like Me" found throughout the album, he highlighted tracks like "Tryna' Tryna'" and "What Your Life Like" as lyrical standouts, saying that "Drenched in Auto-Tune and more frustrated than a ringtone rapper should be, Lil Durk turns in a surprisingly down effort."

Kellan Miller of HipHopDX was mixed about the album, praising Durk's lyricism on self-reflecting tracks like "Resume" and "Don't Judge Me" but felt his personal life forced him to fabricate certain stories with gangsta rap clichés, saying that, "[T]he title's overt demand for permanent residency in the collective consumer's cerebral cortex ultimately amounts to Remember My Name's slightly-above mediocre status." He also said that it will only appeal to loyal Durk fans. Jill Hopkins of Consequence felt the album suffered an identity crisis when it went from hard-hitting hip-hop to soft-willowing R&B due to the use of Auto-Tune, concluding that "A record this anticipated by a man so young, with so much riding on it should sound more important. Instead, Remember My Name sounds a lot like a lot of other things." Jake Jenkins of AbsolutePunk found the album a disappointing let-down, criticizing the middle part for being filler and Durk's limited musicianship revealing a flawed transition from mixtape to full-length project, saying, "That's not the kind of rapper Durk is, at the moment anyway, and all over Remember My Name you get the awkward feeling that Durk is completely out of his element."

== Commercial performance ==
The album debuted at number 14 on the US Billboard 200, with 28,000 equivalent album units; it sold 24,000 copies in its first week, with the remainder of its unit count attributed to streaming activity and track sales. It has sold 48,000 copies in the United States as of June 2016.

== Track listing ==
| No. | Title | Writer(s) | Producer(s) | Length |
|---|---|---|---|---|
| 1. | "500 Homicides" | Durk Banks; Charles Dumazer | C-Sick | 2:43 |
| 2. | "Amber Alert" | Banks; Leland Wayne | Metro Boomin | 3:03 |
| 3. | "Like Me" (featuring Jeremih) | Banks; Allen Ritter; Jeremih Felton; Anderson Hernandez; Matthew Samuels | Vinylz; Boi-1da; Ritter | 3:58 |
| 4. | "Lord Don't Make Me Do It" | Banks; Trocon Roberts Jr.; Steven Bolden | FKi | 3:49 |
| 5. | "Don't Judge Me" | Banks; Sydne George; Brandon Whitfield | B Wheezy | 3:09 |
| 6. | "Tryna' Tryna'" (featuring Logic) | Banks; London Buckner; Sir Robert Hall II | DJ L | 3:20 |
| 7. | "Higher" | Banks; Buckner | DJ L | 3:32 |
| 8. | "Resume" | Banks; Tyree Pittman | Young Chop | 3:13 |
| 9. | "What Your Life Like" | Banks; Pittman | Young Chop | 3:07 |
| 10. | "Why Me" | Banks; London Holmes | London on da Track | 3:52 |
| Total length: | | | | 33:46 |

Deluxe edition (bonus tracks)
| No. | Title | Writer(s) | Producer(s) | Length |
|---|---|---|---|---|
| 11. | "Ghetto (Grew Up)" (featuring Hypno Carlito) | Banks; Pittman | Young Chop | 3:53 |
| 12. | "Remember My Name" (featuring King Popo) | Banks; Buckner; Darius Luckett; Wadell Brooks; Raheem Olowopopo | DJ L; D Brooks Exclusive | 3:28 |
| Total length: | | | | 41:11 |

== Charts ==
=== Weekly charts ===
| Chart (2015) | Peak position |
|---|---|
| US Billboard 200 | 14 |
| US Top R&B/Hip-Hop Albums (Billboard) | 2 |

=== Year-end charts ===
| Chart (2015) | Position |
|---|---|
| US Top R&B/Hip-Hop Albums (Billboard) | 84 |
