= Signed to the Streets 2 =

2014 mixtape by Lil Durk

Mixtape by Lil Durk
- Released: July 7, 2014
- Recorded: 2014
- Genre: Hip hop; drill
- Length: 64:21
- Label: OTF
- Producer: BackPack; C-Sick; Cardo; Dree The Drummer; Flexx Beats; YeX; JPlatinum; LeekeLeek; Murda Beatz; OZ; Squat Beats; Tarentino; The MeKanics; Young Chop

Lil Durk chronology
Signed to the Streets (2013)	Signed to the Streets 2 (2014)	Remember My Name (2015)

Signed to the Streets 2 is the fifth mixtape by American rapper Lil Durk. The mixtape features production from BackPack, C-Sick, Cardo, Dree The Drummer, Flexx Beats, JPlatinum, LeekeLeek, Murda Beatz, OZ, Squat Beats, Tarentino, The Mekanics, Young Chop, and features guest appearances from Ca$h Out, French Montana, Johnny May Cash, Migos, and Young Thug. It is hosted by DJ Drama and Don Cannon. It was released on July 7, 2014. The No DJ version was released on July 22, 2014. As of October 31, 2022, the mixtape has been downloaded over 680,000 times on DatPiff and certified double platinum.

== Track listing ==
No.	Title	Producer(s)	Length
1.	"Ready for 'Em"	Cardo; Yung Exclusive	2:19
2.	"Ten Four"	Murda Beatz	3:12
3.	"War wit Us"	Tarentino	3:19
4.	"Rumors"	C-Sick	3:15
5.	"Don't Take It Personal"	JPlatinum	4:17
6.	"Party" (featuring Young Thug)	Young Chop	3:33
7.	"I Made It"	Young Chop	3:06
8.	"Don't Know Me"	Flexx Beats	2:56
9.	"Feds Listenin'"	Young Chop	3:46
10.	"What You Do to Me"	Squat Beats	2:57
11.	"I Go" (featuring Johnny May Cash)	Young Chop	3:42
12.	"Lil Niggaz" (featuring Migos and Ca$h Out)	Dree The Drummer	6:08
13.	"Gas & Mud"	Murda Beatz	3:38
14.	"Live It Up"	BackPack	4:21
15.	"Perfect Picture"	LeekeLeek	3:12
16.	"Hell In My City"	Dree The Drummer	3:30
17.	"Ain't Did Shit"	Dree The Drummer	3:35
18.	"Fly High" (featuring French Montana)	The Mekanics; OZ	3:35
Total length:			64:21
