= Hypno Carlito =

American rapper from Chicago, Illinois

- Born: Robert Roger Amparan; May 21, 1989 (age 36); Chicago, Illinois, U.S.
- Genres: Hip hop
- Occupations: Rapper; singer; songwriter
- Instrument: Vocals
- Years active: 2015–present
- Label: Forever Legend Records
- Member of: Only the Family

Robert Roger Amparan (born May 21, 1989), known professionally as Hypno Carlito, is an American rapper from Chicago, Illinois. He was the first artist signed to fellow Chicago rapper Lil Durk through his Only the Family label in 2015. That same year, he guest appeared on the deluxe edition of Durk's debut album Remember My Name, on the song "Ghetto (Grew Up)". The following year, he released his debut album, Never Say Never (2016). He also served as a ghostwriter for American actor Nick Cannon, having wrote his single "Pray for My City" for Spike Lee's film Chi-raq.

After a hiatus, he released his second album, Good Karma (2020), which contained guest appearances from Durk, as well as Mozzy, Almighty Jay, and Twista. That same year, he served as executive producer for Cannon's album The Miseducation Of The Negro You Love To Hate and produced the film Primary Position the following year.

== Early life ==
Robert Roger Amparan was born on May 21, 1989, in Chicago.

== Career ==
Hypno Carlito released his first single, "Forever", featuring Lil Varney along with its accompanying music video in 2015. Later in 2015, Carlito was signed to fellow Chicago rapper Lil Durk's record label, Only the Family. In 2017, he was featured on Lil Durk and YFN Lucci's single, "Watch Out". Later in 2017, he received local attention for his critically acclaimed mixtape Sorry 4 The Hate. In early 2019, he again received local attention for his mixtape Never Cared featuring Lil Durk. Following the release of Never Cared, Hypno Carlito released Good Karma in December 2019.

== Discography ==
=== Studio albums ===
List of albums & eps, with selected details
Title	Details
Never Say Never	Released: June 12, 2016; Label: La Familia Records; Formats: Digital download
Never Cared	Released: February 21, 2019; Label: Forever Legends Records; Formats: Digital download
Good Karma	Released: December 6, 2019; Label: Forever Legends Records; Formats: Digital download
Almost Perfect	Released: September 6, 2021; Label: Forever Legends Records; Formats: Digital download
2AM in Humboldt Park	Released: November 10, 2024; Label: Forever Legends Records / Only The Family; Formats: Digital download

== Singles ==
List of singles, showing year released and album name
Title	Year	Album
"Forever" featuring Lil Varney	2015	Non-album single
"Want From Me" featuring Lil Durk	2015	Non-album single
"These Niggas Ain't Shit"	2017	Non-album single
"Down Low"	2017	Non-album single
"Pull Up"	2018	Non-album single
"Where I'm At" featuring Waka Flocka Flame	2018	Non-album single
"Fuckin It Up" featuring Sfera Ebbasta	2018	Non-album single
"My Nigga"	2018	Non-album single
"It Is What It Is" featuring Elvy the God	2018	Non-album single
"Remember Me" featuring Laioung	2019	Non-album single
"Our Year” featuring Lil Durk	2019	Non-album single
"Mobster" featuring Smokepurpp	2019	
"New Chicago"	2019	Good Karma
"Havin No Motion"	2023	Non-album single
"Venom"	2024	2AM in Humboldt Park
