= Turn Up a Notch =

2024 single by Lil Durk

Single by Lil Durk

from the album Deep Thoughts
- Released: September 25, 2024
- Genre: Hip-hop
- Length: 2:21
- Label: Alamo
- Songwriters: Durk Banks; Joshua Luellen; Matthew-Kyle Brown; Joe Talamo
- Producers: Southside; Smatt Sertified; Oscar Zulu

Lil Durk singles chronology
"Went Hollywood for a Year" (2024)	"Turn Up a Notch" (2024)	"Monitoring Me" (2024)

Music video
- "Turn Up a Notch" on YouTube

"Turn Up a Notch" is a single by American rapper Lil Durk, that was released under Alamo Records on September 25, 2024, as the lead single from his ninth studio album, Deep Thoughts.

== Background ==
The song was first previewed through Lil Durk's official YouTube channel, with a snippet of the song that was shared with a short on April 25, 2024. Some months later, on September 18, 2024, another short was released on YouTube showing Lil Durk during the shooting of the music video for the song. Finally, Durk announced the release date for the song with a post on the Instagram platform, initially setting it for September 27, 2024, however he later announced an earlier release date, moving it up to September 25, 2024.

== Composition ==
"Turn Up a Notch" is characterized by its hypnotic, guitar-driven beat produced by Southside and Smatt Sertified. The instrumental features skittering hi-hats alongside a somber, looping guitar melody, creating a propulsive yet melancholic backdrop for Durk's reflective lyrics. In the track, Durk delves into the struggles and triumphs of his life, contrasting grim realities with glimpses of his success. Notably, the chorus is a standout element, as it captures Durk's defiant attitude. The lyrics touch on personal hardships, such as being doubted in 2012 and his rise to fame despite adversity. Lines like "Back in 2012, they counted me out / I had to turn up a notch" encapsulate Durk’s perseverance. The song’s laid-back flow and potent verses provide a smooth, yet emotionally charged listening experience.

== Critical reception ==
Elias Andrews from HotNewHipHop praised the single for its "hypnotic blend" of dark subject matter with a smooth delivery. He noted that while the beat is sleek and propulsive, there’s a sadness to it, particularly due to the looped guitar melody, which pairs well with Durk's reflective lyrics. Andrews also highlighted the deceptive strength of the verses, which tackle both the rapper's struggles and his hard-earned successes. Will Schube of HipHopDX echoed similar sentiments, noting that Durk "turns things up a notch" by delivering powerful bars over Southside's production. Both critics agree that "Turn Up a Notch" serves as an effective precursor to Durk's upcoming album, Deep Thoughts.

== Music video ==
The accompanying music video for "Turn Up a Notch", directed by Jerry Production, was released on September 25, 2024 and it features Lil Durk reveling in his success. The visuals highlight Durk's newfound lifestyle, showcasing him alongside Sexyy Red and Hunxho, who make brief appearances. The video reinforces the song’s themes of rising from hardship to success, as Durk is seen enjoying the spoils of his accomplishments.

== Charts ==
Chart performance for "Turn Up a Notch"
Chart (2024–2025)	Peak position
US Bubbling Under Hot 100 (Billboard)	1
US Hot R&B/Hip-Hop Songs (Billboard)	30
