= Signed to the Streets =

Mixtape by Lil Durk
- Released: October 10, 2013
- Recorded: 2013
- Genres: Hip hop; drill
- Length: 51:19
- Label: Only the Family
- Producers: DJ Drama (exec.); Chase Davis; Dree The Drummer; Fade; Nito Beats; Paris Beuller; Sunny Norway; TGM; Young Chop; Zaytoven

Lil Durk chronology
Life Ain't No Joke (2012)	Signed to the Streets (2013)	Signed to the Streets 2 (2014)

Singles from Signed To The Streets
- 1. "Dis Ain't What U Want" Released: May 5, 2013

Signed to the Streets is the 4th mixtape by American drill rapper Lil Durk, hosted by DJ Drama. It was released on October 10, 2013. The mixtape features production by Chase Davis, Dree The Drummer, Fade, Nito Beats, Paris Beuller, Sunny Norway, TGM, Young Chop and Zaytoven. The mixtape features a sole guest appearance from Lil Reese who appears twice on the mixtape.

== Recording and reception ==
Lil Durk summarized the mixtape in an interview with MTV: "It's a lot more interesting. There's a lot more storytelling. It's different from my last mixtape, but it’s still real rapping. I just stepped it up a notch. I got DJ Drama, and he made it bigger."

Rolling Stone ranked Signed to the Streets eighth on its list of the top 10 mixtapes of 2013. Stereogum's Tom Breihan wrote that the mixtape "has the tough-minded energy that made so much of that drill stuff exciting in the first place, and it also has other things working for it: Hooks, songcraft, emotional force, a sound of its own." Renato Pagnani of Pitchfork called it Lil Durk's "best mixtape yet. He continues to straddle the blurry line between singing and rapping, and his songwriting has grown tighter and more evocative with time. Before, his use of Auto-Tune felt a bit gratuitous, but now it's woven into his style more organically."

== Track listing ==
No.	Title	Producer(s)	Length
1.	"Traumatized"	Chase Davis	3:14
2.	"Competition" (featuring Lil Reese)	Paris Beuller	3:18
3.	"Can't Go Like That"	Dree The Drummer	3:26
4.	"Don't Understand Me"	Paris Beuller	3:24
5.	"Bang Bros"	Young Chop	3:04
6.	"100 Rounds"	TGM	3:09
7.	"Hittaz"	Paris Beuller	3:21
8.	"Who Is This"	Zaytoven	2:47
9.	"Dis Ain't What U Want"	Paris Beuller	3:21
10.	"Street Life" (featuring Lil Reese)	Bbanks	4:27
11.	"Oh My God"	Paris Beuller; Sunny Norway	3:15
12.	"Introduce Me"	Nito Beats	3:11
13.	"One Night"	Young Chop	3:24
14.	"52 Bars, Pt. 2"	Young Chop	3:10
15.	"Times"	Fade	4:32
Total length:			51:19
