= India Royale =

American makeup artist (born 1995)

- Born: India Cox; March 9, 1995 (age 31); Chicago, Illinois, U.S.
- Education: Robert Lindblom Math & Science Academy
- Occupations: Makeup artist; fashion blogger; entrepreneur
- Years active: 2017–present
- Spouse: Lil Durk (m. 2024)
- Children: 2
- Website: indiaroyalebeauty.com

India Cox-Banks (born March 9, 1995), better known by her stage name India Royale, is an American fashion blogger and entrepreneur. Based in Chicago, Illinois, she has been married to Chicago-based rapper Lil Durk since 2024.

== Early life ==
India Royale was born on March 9, 1995, in Chicago, Illinois, where she grew up with two older sisters and one older brother. She attended Robert Lindblom Math & Science Academy for high school.

== Career ==
India Royale rose to fame in 2017 due to her association and relationship with rapper Lil Durk. She gained more recognition on YouTube by uploading makeup videos and hair tutorials, but over the years, her content evolved to include more vlogs, challenges, and promotional content. Royale launched her own cosmetics line, India Royale Beauty, in 2024. She also received a co-sign from Canadian rapper Drake in 2021.

== Personal life ==
India Royale has two children: a daughter named Skylar from a previous relationship, and a daughter named Willow with her husband, Lil Durk, to whom she has been married since 2024.
