= The Voice (Lil Durk album) =

Studio album by Lil Durk (2020)

- Standard cover featuring late rapper King Von

Studio album by Lil Durk
- Released: December 24, 2020
- Genres: Hip hop; drill
- Length: 38:38
- Labels: Only the Family; Alamo; Geffen
- Producers: Akel; Aura; AyeTM; Ayo Bleu; Chopsquad DJ; DeAvonte Kimble; DY; G. Fresh; Go Grizzly; Hagan; Hitmaka; Its2ezzy; Jay LV; John Lam; Joseph Leytrick; LowLowTurnMeUp; MalikOTB; Metro Boomin; Morgan O'Connor; Tahj Money; The Superiors; TM88; Touch of Trent; Tre Gilliam; TurnMeUpJosh; Vani; WassupBans; Willskeating; Young Cutta; jp:Trill Dynasty

Lil Durk chronology
Just Cause Y'all Waited 2 (2020)	The Voice (2020)	The Voice of the Heroes (2021)

Singles from The Voice
- 1. "The Voice" Released: September 4, 2020; 2. "Stay Down" Released: October 30, 2020; 3. "Backdoor" Released: December 21, 2020

The Voice is the sixth studio album by American rapper Lil Durk. It was released on December 24, 2020, by Only the Family, Alamo Records and Geffen Records. The album contains guest appearances from late rapper King Von, whom the album is also dedicated, 6lack, Young Thug, YNW Melly, and Booka600. A deluxe edition was released on January 29, 2021, with twelve additional tracks. It features additional guest appearances from Lil Baby, Pooh Shiesty, and Sydny August.

The Voice is Lil Durk's final album for Geffen Records, as his home label, Alamo Records, was acquired by Sony Music in June 2021. Since July 2021, the album is no longer distributed by Geffen Records.

== Background ==
The title of the album is actually Lil Durk's longtime nickname. He had been teasing it for a while, starting with by posting a picture of him on social media, promoting the title track, on August 28, 2020. He initially stated he would release new music on the same day as rapper 6ix9ine's second studio album, TattleTales, amid their feud.

The album is a tribute to late American rapper King Von, a longtime friend and then-labelmate of the rapper, who died from a shooting in Atlanta, Georgia, on November 6, 2020. He was involved in a controversy in a nightclub in the premises of the area at around 3:20 a.m. between two groups of men, one of them being associated with fellow American rapper Quando Rondo. Both parties were using firearms to fight, and two off-duty police officers took part in making the situation come to a close by threatening to use additional gunfire. He was rushed to the hospital and after surgeries, he was pronounced dead. His passing affected Lil Durk heavily, who proceeded to deactivate all of his social media accounts until he announced the release of "Backdoor" on December 20, 2020. Thus, the cover of the album has a picture of the two together.

== Singles ==
The album's lead single, its title track, was released along with a music video on September 4, 2020. The second single, "Stay Down", with American singer 6lack and American rapper Young Thug, was released along with a music video on October 30, 2020. The third single, "Backdoor", was released along with a music video on December 21, 2020.

== Critical reception ==
Professional ratings
Review scores
Source	Rating
AllMusic	3/5 stars

Writing for Allmusic, Fred Thomas stated that "Many tracks on The Voice are built on melancholy piano loops and ethereal samples, but some of the more interesting moments of the album happen when he strays from the somewhat interchangeable instrumentation".

== Commercial performance ==
The Voice debuted at number 46 on the US Billboard 200 chart, earning 23,000 album-equivalent units in its first week with 1 day of sales. The album was released on Thursday so the album's first-week sales came from just one day of activity due to it being the last day of the tracking week. In its second week, the album climbed to number three on the chart, earning an additional 66,000 units. The album sold 87,000 units the week the deluxe was released. This became Lil Durk's third US top-ten album. In its third week, the album climbed to number two on the chart, earning 48,000 more units. In its fourth week, the album dropped to number five on the chart, earning 42,000 units, bringing its four-week total to 179,000 units. On March 4, 2021, it was reported that the album moved over 500,000 units and is eligible to be certified Gold. Geffen Records marketed the album for very short time, as Alamo Records was acquired by Sony Music in June 2021 and its distribution passed to Sony quickly after.

== Track listing ==
The Voice standard track listing
No.	Title	Writer(s)	Producer(s)	Length
1.	"Redman"	Durk Banks; John Lam; Malik Bynoe-Fisher; Leonardo Mateus	Lam; MalikOTB; WassupBans	1:35
2.	"Refugee"	Banks; Lam; Johnfrancis Mbatta	Lam; Its2ezzy	1:56
3.	"Death Ain't Easy"	Banks; Joshua Samuel; Henry Lotas-Sherratt; Giovanni Rana	TurnMeUpJosh; Young Cutta; Vani	3:12
4.	"The Voice"	Banks; Samuel; John Balan; Braylen Rembert; Daiki Ishii	TurnMeUpJosh; LowLowTurnThatUp; Ayo Bleu; Trill Dynasty	2:59
5.	"Backdoor"	Banks; Samuel; Bynoe-Fisher; Rembert; Lachlan Gentle	TurnMeUpJosh; MalikOTB; Ayo Bleu; Aura	3:20
6.	"Still Trappin'" (with King Von)	Banks; Dayvon Bennett; Christian Ward; Kevin Price; London Jae	Hitmaka; Go Grizzly	2:52
7.	"Stay Down" (with 6lack and Young Thug)	Banks; Ricardo Valentine, Jr.; Jeffery Williams; Dwan Avery; Leland Wayne	DY; Metro Boomin	2:49
8.	"Free Jamell" (with YNW Melly)	Banks; Jamell Demons; Darrell Jackson	Chopsquad DJ	3:20
9.	"Misunderstood"	Banks; Avery; Bryan Simmons; Adrian Hearne, Jr.	DY; TM88; Riko Spazzin	2:15
10.	"Not The Same"	Banks; Greg Tecoz	G. Fresh; Chinaman Hustle	2:29
11.	"India, Pt. 3"	Banks; Hagan Lange; Trenton Turner	Hagan; Touch of Trent	2:09
12.	"Coming Clean"	Banks; DeAvonte Kimble; Morgan O'Connor; William Keating	Topp; O'Connor; Williskeating	2:28
13.	"Going Strong"	Banks; Lam; Tahj Vaughn; Frank Gilliam III	Lam; Tahj Money; Tre Gilliam; AKel	2:21
14.	"Changes"	Banks; Thomas Moore	AyeTM	2:03
15.	"Lamborghini Mirrors" (featuring Booka600)	Banks; Darontez Mayo; Turner; Sidney Reynolds; Javon Reynolds; Joseph Leytrick; Junior Sinchi	Touch of Trent; The Superiors; Leytrick; Jay LV	2:44
16.	"To Be Honest"	Banks; Samuel; Lotas-Sherratt; Rembert	TurnMeUpJosh; Young Cutta; Ayo Bleu	2:26
Total length:				38:38

Deluxe bonus tracks
No.	Title	Writer(s)	Producer(s)	Length
17.	"Intro"	Banks; Moore; Turner; Sinchi	Touch of Trent; Jay LV; StrongzOnTheBeat	2:19
18.	"Finesse Out the Gang Way" (featuring Lil Baby)	Banks; Dominique Jones; Jackson	Chopsquad DJ	3:06
19.	"Switched Up"	Banks; Moore	AyeTM	2:19
20.	"Let Em Know"	Banks; Samuel; Balan; Rembert	TurnMeUpJosh; LowLowTurnThatUp; Ayo Bleu	2:55
21.	"Should've Ducked" (featuring Pooh Shiesty)	Banks; Lontrell Williams, Jr.; Devonte Richmond; Maliki Decampos	DJ Bandz; DJ FMCT; ProdByMo; Nom	3:12
22.	"When I'm Lonely"	Banks; Samuel; Balan; Rembert	Touch of Trent; Hagan; LC	1:59
23.	"Every Freakin' Day"	Banks; Lam; Gilliam; Evenson Clauseille; Garrison Boykin; Donald DeGrate	Lam; Gilliam; ThatBossEvan; Gwiz	2:46
24.	"Love You" (featuring Sydny August)	Banks; Sydny Smith; Andrew Bonsu	Dilla; Park Hill	2:58
25.	"I Don't Know"	Banks; Turner; Jake Martin; Paul Davis Gachie	Touch of Trent; Twoprxducers	2:15
26.	"Movement"	Banks; Turner; Devin Lamb; Elaye Slattery	Touch of Trent; Foreiign808; Elxyee	2:26
27.	"Last Minute"	Banks; Samuel; Rembert; Giovanni Gardner	TurnMeUpJosh; Ayo Bleu; Gorilla	1:50
28.	"Kanye Krazy"	Banks; Lam; Vaughn; Lukas Payne; Sterling Reynolds	Lam; Tahj Money; Karltin Bankz; LondnBlue	2:25

Notes

- "Death Ain't Easy" features additional vocals from King Von

== Personnel ==
Credits adapted from Genius, Muso.Ai & Tidal

Technical

- Nick Rice – Recording, Mixing
- Darth Moon – Recording
- Jaylon "Lux" Charles – Recording
- Bainz – Recording
- Scott Taylor Jr. – Recording
- Nickie Jon Pabon – Recording
- Cristian "Castle" Castillo – Mixing, Mastering
- Ethan Stevens – Mixing
- TurnMeUpJosh – Mixing, Mastering
- Colin Leonard – Master Engineer
- Zack “ZSHXCHZ” Shochet – Assistant Engineer

== Charts ==
=== Weekly charts ===
Weekly chart performance for The Voice
Chart (2020–2021)	Peak position
Belgian Albums (Ultratop Flanders)	139
Canadian Albums (Billboard)	6
Dutch Albums (Album Top 100)	86
UK Albums (Official Charts)	26
US Billboard 200	2
US Top R&B/Hip-Hop Albums (Billboard)	1

=== Year-end charts ===
2021 year-end chart performance for The Voice
Chart (2021)	Position
US Billboard 200	19
US Top R&B/Hip-Hop Albums (Billboard)	9

2022 year-end chart performance for The Voice
Chart (2022)	Position
US Billboard 200	172

== Certifications ==
Certifications for The Voice
Region	Certification	Certified units/sales
United Kingdom (BPI)	Silver	60,000^{‡}
United States (RIAA)	Platinum	1,000,000^{‡}
^{‡} Sales+streaming figures based on certification alone.
