= Lil Durk =

American rapper (born 1992)

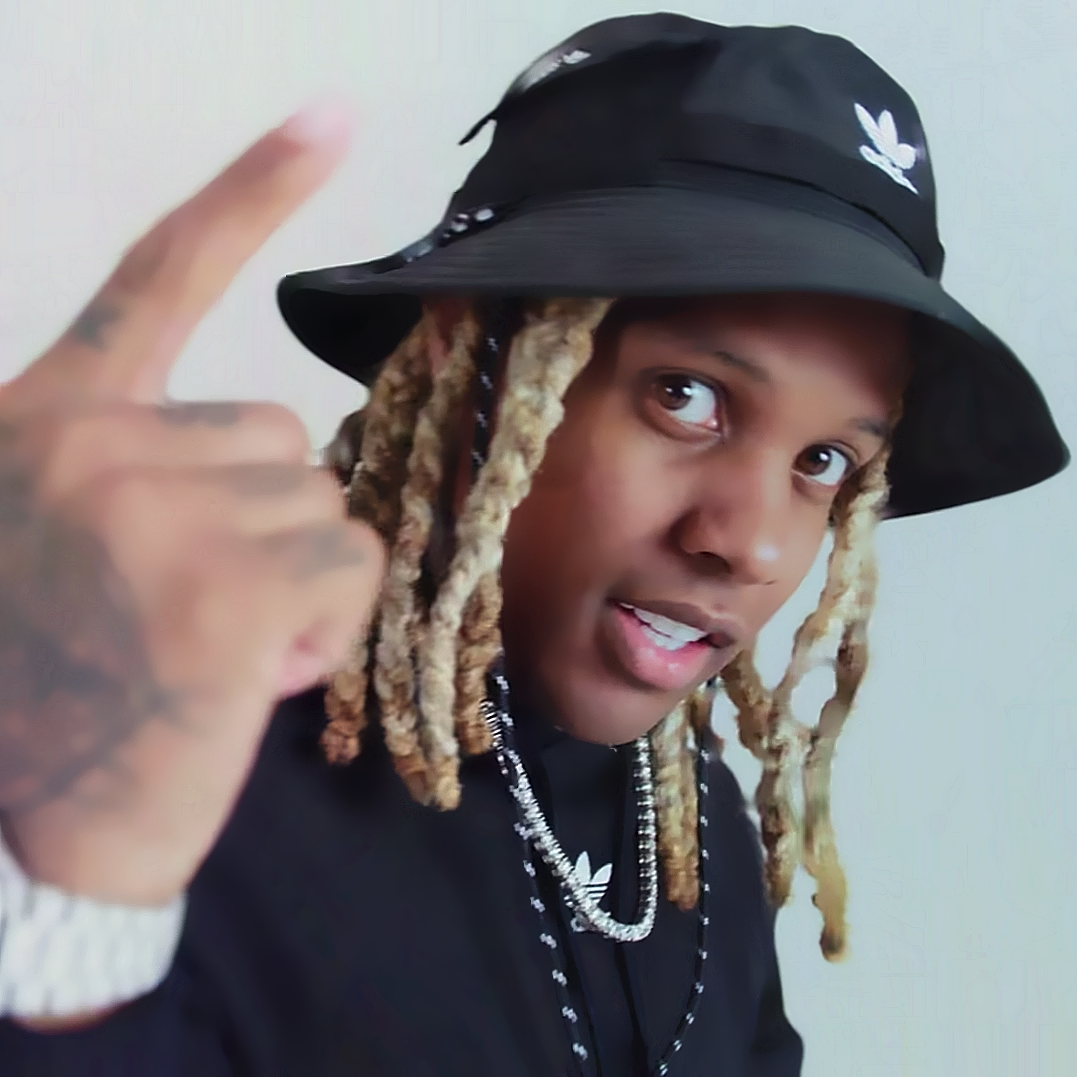
- Lil Durk in 2022

Background information
- Also known as: The Voice; Smurk; Smurkio; Durkio; Mustafa Abdul Malak
- Born: Durk Devontay Banks; October 19, 1992 (age 34); Chicago, Illinois, U.S.
- Genres: Midwestern hip-hop; drill; trap; gangsta rap
- Occupations: Rapper; songwriter
- Works: Lil Durk discography
- Years active: 2010–present
- Labels: Only the Family; Alamo; Geffen; Interscope; Def Jam
- Member of: Only the Family
- Spouse: India Royale (m. 2024)
- Children: 7

- Criminal information
- Status: Incarcerated since October 24, 2024
- Criminal charges: Murder-for-hire, RICO

Details
- Date apprehended: October 24, 2024
- Imprisoned at: MDC Los Angeles, Los Angeles, California, U.S.

Durk Devontay Banks (born October 19, 1992), known professionally as Lil Durk, is an American rapper. Regarded as a pioneer of the Chicago-based hip-hop subgenre drill music, he is often considered the subgenre's most commercially successful artist. He initially garnered local success with the release of his Signed to the Streets mixtape series (2013–2014), which led to him to sign with Def Jam Recordings. The label released his debut studio album, Remember My Name (2015), and its follow-up, Lil Durk 2X (2016), to moderate commercial reception before parting ways with the rapper in 2018.

After self-releasing his Just Cause Y'all Waited mixtape in March 2018, Banks signed with Alamo Records later that July. His 2020 single "Viral Moment" became his first song as a lead artist to enter the Billboard Hot 100, signaling a major breakthrough that year. Along with three further entries on the chart as a lead artist—"3 Headed Goat” (featuring Polo G and Lil Baby), "Backdoor," and "The Voice"—Banks also gained attention with his guest appearances on Drake's "Laugh Now Cry Later" and Pooh Shiesty's "Back in Blood," with the former peaking at number two on the Billboard Hot 100.

He ended 2020 with his sixth album, The Voice (2020), which peaked at number two on the Billboard 200. The next year, his collaborative album with Lil Baby, The Voice of the Heroes (2021), became his first to debut atop on the chart; his seventh album, 7220 (2022), became his second to do so. His eighth and ninth albums, Almost Healed (2023) and Deep Thoughts (2025), both peaked at number three on the chart; the former was led by the single "All My Life" (featuring J. Cole), which peaked at number two on the Billboard Hot 100 and won Best Melodic Rap Performance at the 66th Annual Grammy Awards, marking the biggest commercial success of his career.

Banks has won a Grammy Award from four nominations. He founded the Chicago-based collective and record label Only the Family (OTF) in 2010, which included late rapper King Von. In October 2024, Banks was arrested by federal authorities on a conspiracy to commit murder-for-hire charge against rapper Quando Rondo. He is also suspected in another murder-for-hire plot that occurred in 2022. In September 2026, Banks was acquitted on all charges.

== Early life, family and education ==
Durk Devontay Banks was born on October 19, 1992, in the Englewood neighborhood on the South Side of Chicago, Illinois. His father, Dontay Banks Sr. (later known as Abdul Haqq) was incarcerated when Durk was seven months old. He recalled times during his youth when there was not enough food at home.

He began to establish a presence on social media channels like Myspace and YouTube; he grew fond of the idea of being a rapper as his online fan base started to expand. Banks started taking his career more seriously after becoming a father at age 17. He quit school at Paul Robeson High School when he joined the Black Disciples, a street gang in Chicago. Soon thereafter, he began having trouble with the law. He served time in October 2011 due to gun charges, including possession of a firearm with a defaced serial number. He later pleaded guilty to a reduced charge of aggravated unauthorized use of a weapon, and did not serve any additional time.

== Career ==
=== 2010–2014: Early career, rise to popularity, signing to OTF and Def Jam Recordings, and Signed to the Streets duology ===
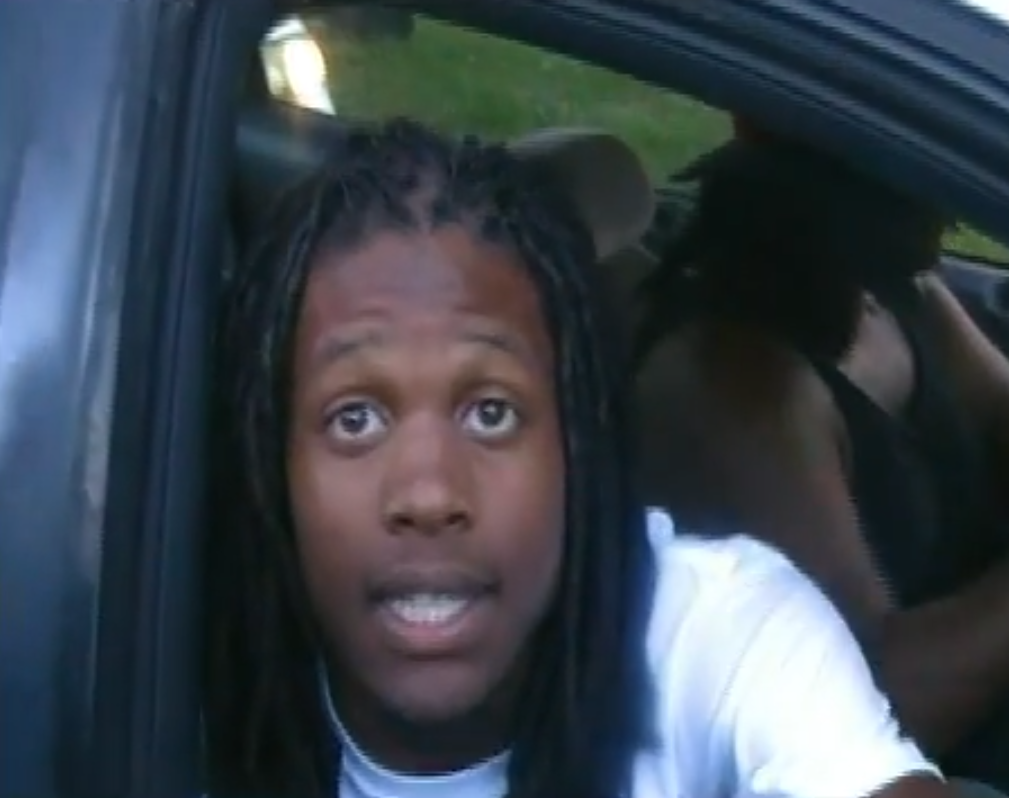
Lil Durk at East 72nd Street, Greater Grand Crossing, Chicago in 2011

In 2010, Durk released a freestyle over an instrumental version of the song “Wasted”, by Gucci Mane and Plies. Durk's version of the song is titled "Lamron Wasted". That same year, he released "L's Bitch" featuring Lil Reese. After plans to sign with Chief Keef and French Montana's labels fell through, he considered rapping as "a full-time career" after the releases of his two singles, "Sneak Dissin'" and "I'ma Hitta", each of which received generally positive feedback locally.

On August 26, 2011, Durk released his debut mixtape: I'm A Hitta, followed by I'm Still A Hitta on April 3, 2012. On October 19, 2012, Durk released his third mixtape, Life Ain't No Joke. As of September 22, 2012, the mixtape has been downloaded over 216,000 times on DatPiff. In December 2012, Durk released the track, called "L's Anthem", which was remixed, featuring French Montana, as a re-release.

In 2013, due to the popularity of "L's Anthem" and its follow-up single, "Dis Ain't What U Want", Durk accepted a joint venture deal with his collective Only the Family and Def Jam Recordings. After a small number of delays, Durk's fourth mixtape, Signed to the Streets, was released on October 14, 2013, exclusively on DatPiff. It features a guest appearance from former Glo Gang affiliate Lil Reese, who appears on two of the mixtape's tracks. The mixtape also features production credits from Paris Bueller and Young Chop, along with others.

Eight music videos were released to promote Signed to the Streets: "Bars Pt. 2", "Oh My God", "100 Rounds", "Dis Ain't What U Want", "Bang Bros", "Traumatized", "Hittaz", and "Times". Signed to the Streets would later be named the eighth best mixtape of 2013 by Rolling Stone. On October 22, 2013, in an interview with XXL, Durk said he was working on his debut album under Def Jam Recordings. In addition to working on his debut album, Durk was named part of the 2014 XXL Freshmen Class and later in the year on July 7, 2014, Durk released his fifth mixtape, Signed to the Streets 2.

=== 2015–2016: Remember My Name and Lil Durk 2X ===
On March 25, 2015, Durk announced the title of his debut studio album, Remember My Name, and revealed the album's expected release date, May 12, 2015. On March 31, 2015, the album's lead single, "Like Me", featuring Jeremih, was released and later went on to chart on the Billboard Bubbling Under Hot 100 chart, peaking at number 9. Later that year, on April 20, 2015, Durk announced that the expected May 12 release date of Remember My Name was delayed; he also revealed the official album cover and announced that its release had been pushed back to June 2, 2015.

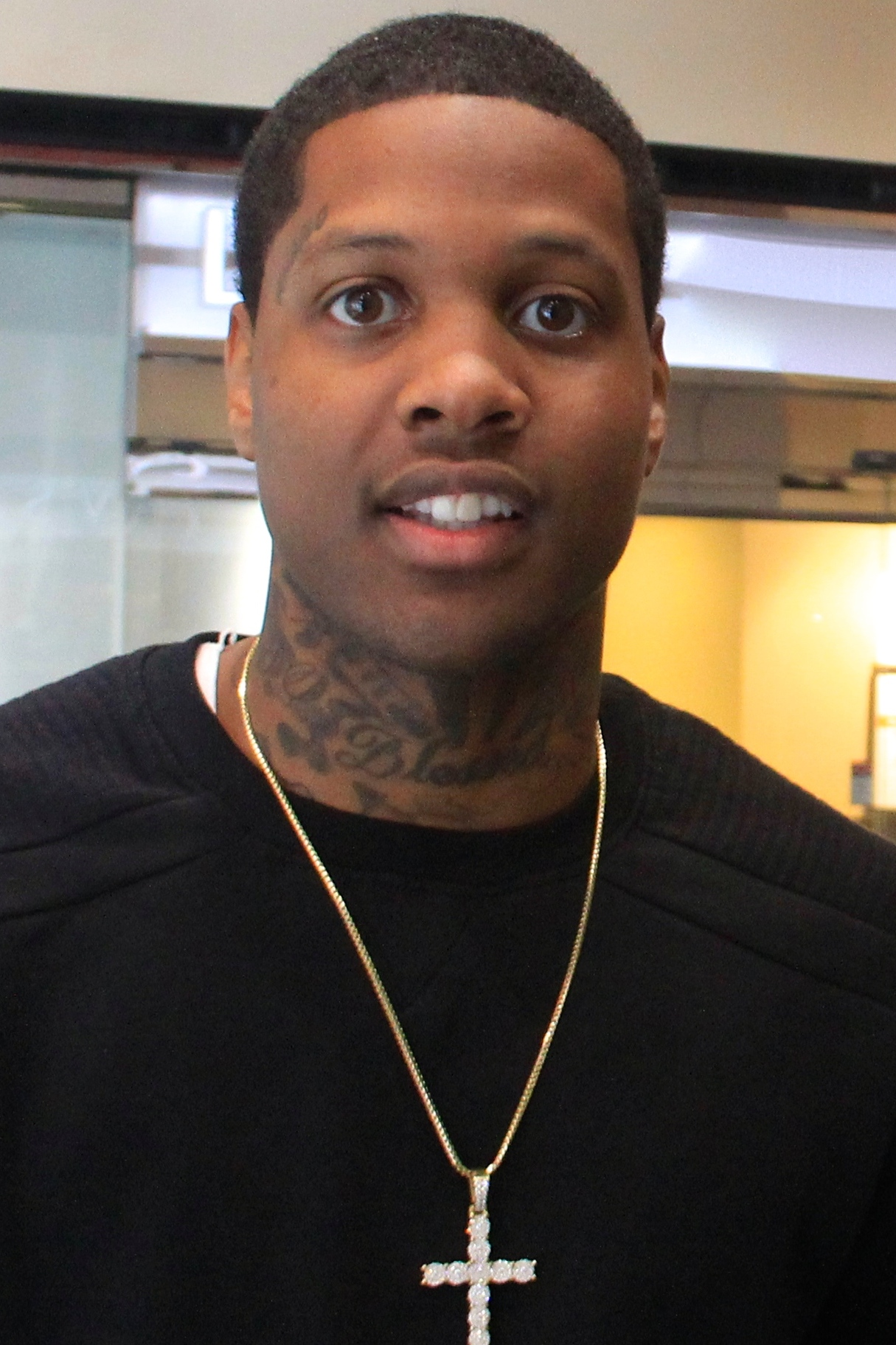
Lil Durk in 2015

On June 2, 2015, Durk's debut album, Remember My Name, was released after a few delays. The album became his first project to chart on the Billboard 200, peaking at number 14 with 28,000 equivalent album units(including 24,000 copies in pure album sales), with the remainder of the album's unit count attributed to streaming activity and track sales. On December 15, 2015, Durk released his sixth mixtape, 300 Days, 300 Nights. The only single released in promotion for the mixtape was "My Beyoncé", which features Detroit rapper Dej Loaf. The single was released on November 20, 2015, and peaked at number two on the Billboard Bubbling Under Hot 100 chart. The official music video for "My Beyoncé" was released on January 13, 2016. On June 5, 2017, the single was certified gold by the Recording Industry Association of America (RIAA) for single-equivalent units of over 500,000 copies.

On July 22, 2016, Lil Durk 2X, Durk's second studio album, was released. Earlier in 2016, on May 23, he released the lead single from the album, "She Just Wanna", featuring Ty Dolla $ign. The other two singles from the album include: "True", which was released on June 10, 2016, and "Money Walk", which features Yo Gotti and was released on July 22, 2016. The album failed to meet the same standards as his previous studio album, with Lil Durk 2X debuting and peaking at number twenty-nine on the Billboard 200.

Later that November, Durk released his seventh mixtape, They Forgot. The mixtape features guest appearances from Lil Reese, Meek Mill, Mozzy, OTF Ikey, 21 Savage, Hypno Carlito, Dej Loaf, YFN Lucci, and BJ the Chicago Kid. While the production was handled by C-Sick, ChopSquad DJ, Donis Beats, DP Beats, LeekeLeek, Kid Wonder, London on da Track, TY Made It, and Young Chop. The mixtape was supported by the single "Baller". On December 7, 2016, Durk's single, "Like Me", from his debut studio album, Remember My Name, was certified gold by the RIAA.

=== 2017–2019: Just Cause Y’all Waited, Signed to the Streets 3, other projects, and Love Songs 4 the Streets 2 ===
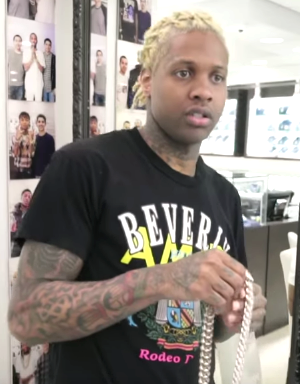
Lil Durk in 2019

Throughout the year 2017, Durk released several mixtapes; starting with Love Songs for the Streets which was released on February 28, 2017; Supa Vultures, a collaborative mixtape with Lil Reese which was released on August 11, 2017; Signed to the Streets 2.5 which was released on October 19, 2017; and Bloodas, a collaborative mixtape with Tee Grizzley which was released on December 8, 2017. Bloodas was the only mixtape of the four released to chart on the Billboard 200, charting at number 96.

On March 29, 2018, Durk announced that his twelfth mixtape would be released the next day at midnight, and his first mixtape was to be released for digital retail, Just Cause Y'all Waited. At the same time, he also confirmed that he fulfilled his contract with Def Jam Records. The following day, Durk was a free agent due to fulfilling his contract with Def Jam Records, causing him to release Just Cause Y'all Waited exclusively on Apple Music and the iTunes Store.

Just Cause Y'all Waited had been available for stream or download on other platforms. The mixtape became Durk's second mixtape, following Bloodas in 2017, and first solo mixtape to chart on any type of Billboard chart. Charting at number 57 on the Billboard 200, 28 on the Top R&B/Hip-Hop Albums chart and 22 on the Rap Albums chart, respectively.

Durk also announced a collaborative project with 808 Mafia producer DY, "Durkio Krazy", which still hasn't been released and could possibly be canceled entirely. On May 3, 2019, Durk was featured on the remix of "Crazy Story" by fellow rapper King Von. With a related music video, the remix is called "Crazy Story 2.0" which would later be part of Von's debut mixtape, Grandson, Vol. 1. The song peaked at number 81 on the Billboard Hot 100.

As of July 27, 2018, Durk announced that he signed to Alamo Records and Interscope Records, and released his third studio album Signed to the Streets 3 on November 9, 2018, under Alamo/Interscope. It features guest appearances from Young Dolph, Gunna, A Boogie wit da Hoodie, Future, Kevin Gates, Lil Baby, Lil Skies, TK Kravitz, and Ty Dolla Sign.

Love Songs 4 the Streets 2, Lil Durk's fourth studio album, was released in July 2019, serving as a sequel to his 2017 mixtape Love Songs 4 the Streets. It featured guest appearances from 21 Savage, A Boogie wit da Hoodie, Key Glock, King Von, Meek Mill, and Nicki Minaj. The album peaked at number four on the Billboard 200 in the United States, marking his first top-ten entry on the chart.

=== 2020–2022: Just Cause Y'all Waited 2, The Voice, The Voice of the Heroes, and 7220 ===
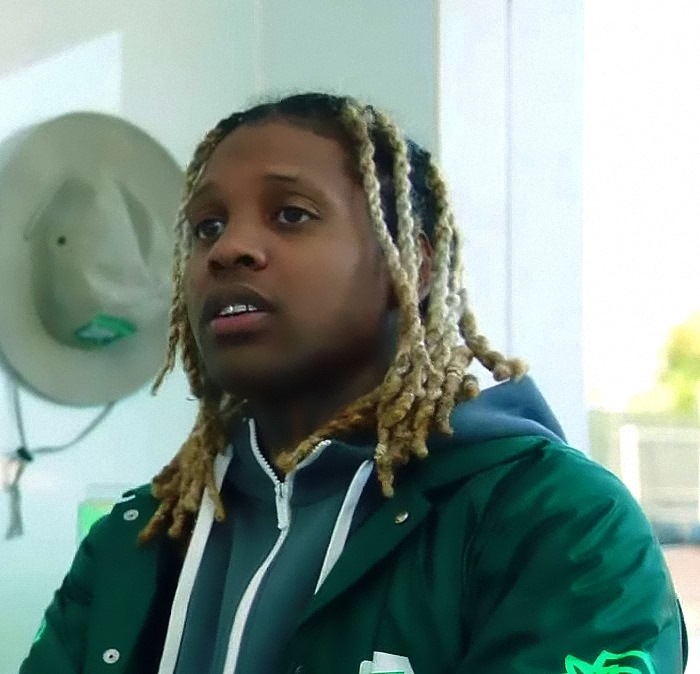
Lil Durk in 2020

To start off 2020, Durk released the stand-alone single “Chiraq Demons”, which features fellow rapper G Herbo and was released on March 21, 2020. Durk then followed thereafter with the stand-alone single “All Love”, which was released on March 29, 2020. Durk then released singles for his at the time upcoming fifth studio album Just Cause Y'all Waited 2, which was released on May 8, 2020. The album most notably contained the singles “Viral Moment”, which was released on April 8, 2020, and peaked at number 91 on the Billboard Hot 100, and "3 Headed Goat", which features Polo G and Lil Baby and was released on May 7, 2020, the song peaked at number 43 on the Billboard Hot 100.

Just Cause Y’all Waited 2 as previously mentioned above was released on May 8, 2020, and debuted at number five on the Billboard 200. A deluxe edition of the album was later released on June 26, 2020, with seven additional tracks, helping the album climb to a new peak of number two on the Billboard 200. On August 5, 2020, Durk appeared as a featured artist on the song "All These Niggas", by Only The Family affiliate and fellow rapper King Von in support of his debut studio album, Welcome to O'Block; the song's official music video garnered 24 million views in two months on YouTube. Banks could not appear or be in the music video for legal reasons. “All These Niggas” debuted and peaked at number 77 on the Billboard Hot 100.

On August 14, 2020, Durk was featured on the single “Laugh Now Cry Later” by Canadian rapper Drake. The song was a commercial success, debuting and peaking at number two on the Billboard Hot 100, becoming Durk's first top 40, top 20, and top 10 entry, and his highest-charting song, until the number-two chart position was matched with Durk's own “All My Life” in 2023. On August 28, 2020, Lil Durk confirmed that an upcoming album would be titled The Voice, which would eventually turn out to be the title track for his sixth studio album, The Voice. Durk first hinted that The Voice would be released sometime in October 2020. He initially stated he would release new music on the same day as rapper 6ix9ine's second studio album, TattleTales, to amid their feud at the time.

The title track was released as the lead single from the album, along with the music video on September 4, 2020. The title track would debut and peak at number 62 on the Billboard Hot 100. He later released the album's second single, "Stay Down" with American singer 6lack and American rapper Young Thug along with the music video on October 30, 2020, and the song peaked at number 73 on the Billboard Hot 100. On November 5, 2020, Durk was featured on fellow rapper Pooh Sheisty's single “Back In Blood”, which debuted at number 93 on the Billboard Hot 100 and after the song going viral online later peaked at number 13. “Back In Blood” also serves as the lead single from Sheisty's debut mixtape Sheisty Season. He then released "Backdoor" as the third and final single, along with the music video on December 21, 2020, “Backdoor” would also peak at number 62 on the Billboard Hot 100.

The Voice was released on December 24, 2020. It is a tribute to his labelmate and late close friend, King Von, who is on the cover, and who was featured on the song, "Still Trappin'”, which “Still Trappin’” would go on to debut and peak at number 53 on the Billboard Hot 100.

On March 3, 2021, Durk, King Von, Booka600, and Memo600 released the collaborative single “Jump”, which peaked at number 9 on the Billboard Bubbling Under Hot 100 chart and was released as the sixth and final single from Only The Family's fourth compilation album: Loyal Bros. On June 4, 2021, Lil Durk released a song with fellow rapper Lil Baby titled “Voice of the Heroes” which debuted and peaked at number 21 on the Billboard Hot 100 and happened to be the lead and only single from his collaborative album with Lil Baby, The Voice of the Heroes which also was released on June 4, 2021. The album also became Durk's first number one album on the Billboard 200 chart as well as Lil Baby's second.

On August 29, 2021, Durk was featured on Kanye West's song “Jonah” from West's tenth studio album Donda, however every song on the album with features did not receive credit, therefore Durk was not credited on the song. On September 3, 2021, Durk was also featured alongside Giveon on Drake's song "In the Bible", which is from Drake's sixth studio album Certified Lover Boy. “In the Bible” peaked at number 7 on the Billboard Hot 100, marking Durk's second top-ten entry following “Laugh Now Cry Later” in 2020.

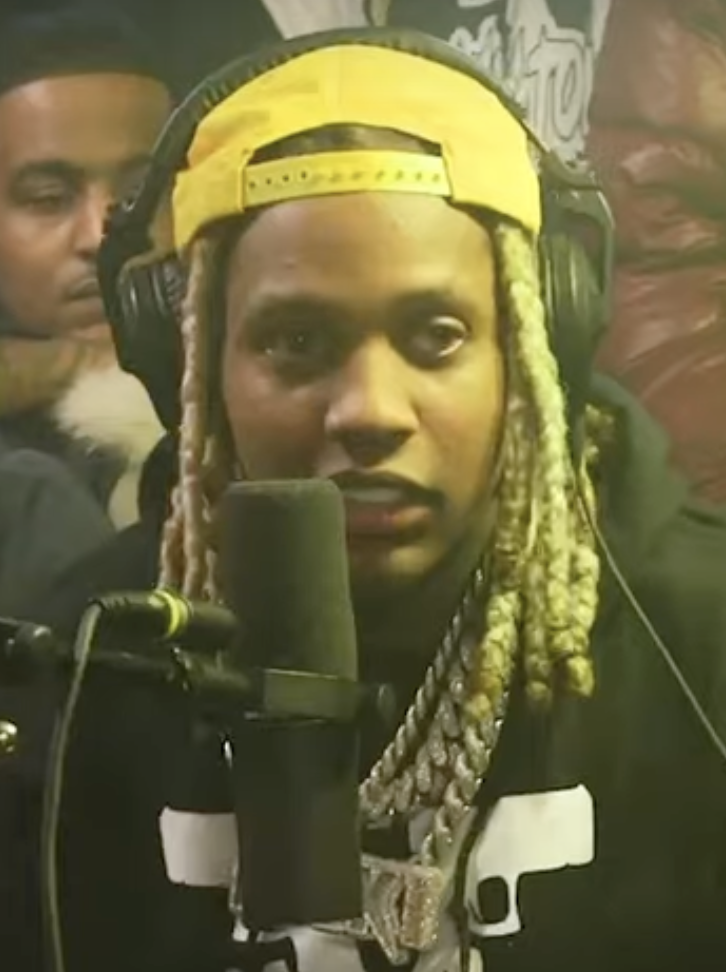
Lil Durk in March 2022

On October 15, 2021, Durk released “Pissed Me Off”, which peaked at number 39 on the Billboard Hot 100 and serves as the lead single from his at the time upcoming seventh studio album 7220. On November 5, 2021, Durk released the stand-alone single “Lion Eyes”, which peaked at number 3 on the Billboard Bubbling Under Hot 100 chart. On December 17, 2021, Durk collaborated with the high-profile country musician Morgan Wallen to release the single “Broadway Girls”, which was a commercial success and happened to be a top-20 hit on the Billboard Hot 100, peaking at number 14 on the chart and happened to be the second single for Durk's album 7220.

On February 22, 2022, Lil Durk released a new single, "Ahhh Ha", produced by Southside. He initially stated that his seventh studio album, 7220, was due to be released on the same day, but it was pushed back to March 11; it was released then, consisting of 17 tracks, including guest appearances from Future, Gunna, Summer Walker, and Morgan Wallen.

On July 31, 2022, Durk announced that following an incident that occurred on July 30, where his head was struck by an explosive pyrotechnic, he will be suspending performing and recording to recover from his injuries. In the accident, which happened during his set at the Lollapalooza music festival in Chicago, Durk suffered injuries to his face and right eye. On November 14, 2022, Durk was featured on American rapper Roddy Ricch's single titled, "Twin", The song was number 1 on the US Bubbling Under Hot 100 Singles, and it was number 35 on the US Hot R&B/Hip-Hop Songs, the song later appeared on Feed Tha Streets III, the third commercial mixtape by Roddy Ricch.

=== 2023: Almost Healed and Nightmares in the Trenches ===
After appearing on the cover of XXL, Lil Durk appeared in an interview in which he teased the release of his eighth studio album, a sequel to his sixth studio album, The Voice (2020). When asked about the album, he stated: "Growth. That's what the "2.0" stand for, just be on another level. Just not only music-wise, like the things around me like I told you, growing from the friends around me, management. Sitting with the mayor. We doin’ big charity things. Neighborhood Heroes, the foundation I got."

On May 5, Durk announced that the title had been changed to Almost Healed. The album was released on May 26 and features guest appearances from Alicia Keys, J. Cole, Chief Wuk, Future, 21 Savage, Kodak Black, Rob49, the late Juice Wrld, and Morgan Wallen. The lead single, "All My Life" featuring J. Cole, was released on May 12. The song debuted and peaked at number two on the Billboard Hot 100, giving Durk his highest-charting song as a lead artist and matching Drake's "Laugh Now Cry Later" as his highest-charting song overall.

The second single, "Pelle Coat", was released on May 25 respectively, alongside the promotional single "Therapy Session", a collaboration with Alicia Keys. Pelle Coat debuted and peaked at number 35 on the Hot 100. The album debuted and peaked at number three on the Billboard 200. Durk later shared that he would be releasing a new album soon, which would have thirteen tracks after his previous couple solo albums had a few more tracks than that and ran for longer.

On August 18, 2023, Durk released a single titled, "F*ck U Thought", which is the lead single to his deluxe edition of Almost Healed. And on November 10, 2023, he released another single titled, "Smurk Carter", which serves as the lead and only single to his fifth compilation album, Nightmares in the Trenches. On November 17, 2023, Durk released his fifth compilation album titled Nightmares in the Trenches, which is also a collaboration with artists from his label Only the Family and the project features guest appearances from OTF Boonie Moe, Rob49, THF Zoo, Cokilla, Chief Wuk, Doodie Lo, YTB Fatt, Icewear Vezzo, Deeski, and Booka600.^{[2]} On October 27, 2023, David Guetta featured Ayra Starr and Lil Durk on a house-influenced Afrobeats song titled "Big FU".

=== 2024–present: First Grammy win, Deep Thoughts and Love Songs 4 the Streets 3 announcement ===
On January 12, 2024, Durk made a guest appearance on 21 Savage's American Dream on the song "Dangerous".

On February 4, at the 66th Annual Grammy Awards, Lil Durk won his first Grammy after three previous nominations. He won Best Melodic Rap Performance with the song "All My Life" featuring J. Cole, the lead single from his eighth studio album Almost Healed.

In late January 2024, Durk announced the future release of his next studio album in response to a Kanye West post, revealing the project's title as Love Songs 4 the Streets 3. The album was intended as a sequel to both his 2017 commercial mixtape Love Songs 4 the Streets and his 2019 studio album Love Songs 4 the Streets 2. On February 23, 2024, Durk released the project's lead single, an introspective track titled "Old Days", accompanied by an official music video on the same day.

On June 28, 2024, he followed up with another single, "Went Hollywood for a Year", and released "Turn Up a Notch" on September 25, 2024. In October 2024 Love Songs 4 the Streets 3 was announced to be deferred and replaced by a new studio album titled Deep Thoughts, which was initially set to be released on October 18, 2024. The album release was postponed following Banks' incarceration in November. The album was preceded by five singles: "Turn Up a Notch", later added to the album’s final tracklist, was followed by "Monitoring Me" on October 4, 2024, "Late Checkout" on October 11, "Opportunist" six days after, and "Can't Hide It" two days before the album’s debut, on March 26, 2025. Deep Thoughts was released on March 28, 2025.

== Only the Family ==
Only the Family is a collective formed by Lil Durk in 2010. Artists such as the late King Von, the late OTF Nuski, Doodie Lo, Booka600, OTF DEDE and OTF Boonie Moe are associated with the label.

== Personal life ==
Durk is a Muslim. He has seven children. Since 2021 he had been engaged to his longtime girlfriend, India Royale. After his 2024 arrest, it was revealed that they were married the same year.

On May 31, 2014, Durk's cousin OTF Nunu, also known as Nuski, was shot and killed. On March 27, 2015, Uchenna "OTF Chino Dolla" Agina, Durk's friend and manager, was shot dead. On November 6, 2020, Lil Durk's affiliate and fellow rapper King Von was fatally shot outside a nightclub in Atlanta. On June 6, 2021, Durk's brother, Dontay "DThang" Banks Jr, was shot and killed outside of a Chicago nightclub.

In the early hours of July 11, 2021, Durk was targeted in a home invasion, where he and his girlfriend India exchanged gunfire with the suspects. Nobody was harmed, and the suspects fled the scene.

In July 2023, TMZ reported that Durk was hospitalized due to severe dehydration and exhaustion.

== Legal issues ==
Banks' 2024 mugshot after his arrest in Broward County, Florida

In late 2011, Durk was arrested on a weapons charge. He was released on bond, but was later sentenced to 3 months. On June 5, 2013, Durk was arrested after allegedly throwing a loaded .40 caliber handgun into his car when police approached him on South Green Street in Chicago. He was charged with unlawful use of a weapon by a felon. He was held on $100,000 bond, and his lawyer claimed to have nine affidavits from witnesses who confirm Durk's innocence. One witness also admitted the gun was his. Durk was released on July 18, 2013.

On August 19, 2016, Durk was cleared of disregarding probation when he was arrested on felony gun charges. The judge dropped the charges.

In May 2019, Lil Durk and King Von were arrested on charges relating to a non-lethal shooting that took place earlier that year on February 5. According to prosecutors, the two men robbed and shot a man outside a popular Atlanta drive-in, for a Jeep Cherokee and $30,000. After weeks in jail, Durk and Von were released on $250,000 and $300,000 bonds, respectively. In October 2022, the charges against Durk were dismissed.

On October 9, 2024, it was reported that Durk, the estate of King Von and OTF Records were named in a wrongful death lawsuit filed by the estate and family of gang rival and Chicago rapper Carlton "FBG Duck" Weekly, who was murdered outside of a Gold Coast strip mall on August 4, 2020. The lawsuit and its attorneys claimed that Durk and his OTF Records imprint were "profiting off of Weekly's death through negligence and misconduct".

=== Murder-for-hire case ===
On October 24, 2024, Kavon Grant, Deandre Wilson, Keith Jones, David Lindsey, and Asa Houston, all alleged associates of Durk's Only the Family (OTF) collective, were arrested and charged in connection with the August 2022 shooting that targeted rapper Quando Rondo and resulted in the death of his cousin, Saviay'a "Lul Pab" Robinson. Federal prosecutors alleged that the attack was carried out in retaliation for the 2020 killing of Durk's close friend and OTF artist King Von, and that travel and other expenses for members of the alleged hit team were paid through resources associated with OTF.

Durk was arrested in South Florida late on October 24, near Miami International Airport, on a federal complaint alleging conspiracy to use interstate facilities to commit murder-for-hire resulting in death. A superseding indictment filed in November charged him alongside the five other defendants and alleged that he had placed a bounty on Rondo and used his influence and financial resources to facilitate the attack. Durk pleaded not guilty. Following his arrest, the village of Broadview, Illinois, revoked an honorary key it had awarded him on October 18 and terminated its partnership with his Neighborhood Heroes Foundation.

At a December 12 detention hearing, prosecutors also cited a separate federal investigation into the January 2022 killing of Stephon Mack in Chicago. Previously sealed court records alleged that Durk had offered money for retaliatory killings following the death of his brother; Durk had not been charged in connection with Mack's death at the time. A magistrate judge denied a proposed bond package backed by more than $3 million in cash and property and ordered that Durk remain detained pending trial. His trial, originally scheduled for January 7, 2025, was repeatedly postponed as the court deemed the case unusually complex and the parties reviewed a large volume of discovery, first moving to October 2025 and later into 2026. In February 2025, Robinson's mother, Andrea Laquila Robinson, filed a wrongful-death lawsuit in Cook County against Durk, OTF and others in connection with her son's death. In June 2025, federal prosecutors notified the court that they would not seek the death penalty, leaving life imprisonment as the most severe possible sentence in the murder-for-hire case.

In June 2026, a third superseding indictment added racketeering-related allegations involving a separate January 2022 killing in Chicago and other alleged violent activity. Durk's attorneys sought to prevent the new allegations from being tried together with the Los Angeles murder-for-hire case, arguing that they had been introduced shortly before trial. On July 14, U.S. District Judge Michael W. Fitzgerald granted Durk's request to sever the newly added racketeering allegations from the forthcoming murder-for-hire trial, leaving them to be litigated separately. Jury selection in the murder-for-hire case began on August 20, with opening statements beginning on August 24. Prosecutors argued that Durk had used his money and influence to organize a retaliatory attack on Rondo, while the defense denied that he had ordered the shooting and challenged the credibility of cooperating witnesses, including former associates who had entered plea agreements and testified for the government. Three former members of Durk's inner circle, including his former personal assistant Kavon Grant, testified for the prosecution after reaching plea agreements, while Durk did not testify in his own defense.

On September 11, 2026, following approximately two weeks of testimony and three days of jury deliberations, a federal jury in Los Angeles acquitted Durk on all five counts against him: conspiracy to commit stalking, stalking using a dangerous weapon, stalking resulting in death, conspiracy to use interstate commerce facilities to commit murder-for-hire resulting in death, and use of interstate commerce facilities to commit murder-for-hire resulting in death.

Co-defendants Deandre Wilson and David Lindsey were likewise acquitted of the murder-for-hire charges, but were convicted of conspiracy to commit stalking, stalking with a dangerous weapon and stalking resulting in death. The verdict followed a trial centered heavily on testimony from cooperating witnesses; Durk's defense argued that Grant had organized the shooting without Durk's knowledge and portrayed the government's cooperators as unreliable witnesses seeking reduced sentences. Durk was not immediately released following the verdict because the racketeering, murder and firearms charges severed from the murder-for-hire case remained pending in a separate federal trial scheduled for October 5, 2026.

== Feuds ==
=== Chief Keef, Lil Reese, The Game, and Tyga ===
Durk was involved in a rivalry between fellow Chicago rappers Chief Keef and Joseph "Lil JoJo" Coleman. After Durk released the song "L's Anthem", in which he dissed JoJo's affiliates, JoJo responded with the song "BDK (300K)", where he attacks Keef, Lil Reese, and Durk. The feud ended after Lil JoJo was shot and killed on September 4, 2012. After signing with Def Jam Recordings and Interscope Records in late 2012, tensions developed between Durk and Chief Keef's record label, Glo Gang.

In the Summer of 2013, Lil Durk was arrested for gun charges. Chief Keef refused to pay $10,000 to bail him out, leading to the feud becoming official. After a social media exchange, Durk disassociated himself from Keef's label. Several diss tracks were released, including Durk's remix to Nicki Minaj's "Chiraq", where he attacked Keef and other rappers including Lil Reese, The Game, Tyga, and King L.

Durk called Keef "disrespectful" for turning his back on their friendship by supporting Tyga and The Game's own remix of "Chiraq". The feud ended on amicable terms in August 2014.

Durk's feud with California rappers The Game and Tyga ignited in 2014, after releasing their remix to Nicki Minaj's "Chiraq", called "Chiraq to L.A.". This resulted in Durk and The Game releasing several diss tracks. Within a year, Durk squashed his feuds with Game and Tyga.

=== YoungBoy Never Broke Again and Quando Rondo ===
Durk has been embroiled in a feud between Only the Family protégé King Von and Baton Rouge rapper YoungBoy Never Broke Again. Von and Durk began to diss YoungBoy and vice versa through social media and their music. On November 6, 2020, King Von was shot and killed following an altercation with the YoungBoy Never Broke Again affiliate Quando Rondo. In 2022, following Von's death, and YoungBoy's release from jail, YoungBoy released "Bring the Hook", where he dissed King Von and rappers from Parkway Garden Homes.

The song's release reignited issues between YoungBoy and Durk, which lead to Durk releasing the diss track of "Ahhh Ha". On the same day, YoungBoy released "I Hate YoungBoy", where he dissed Durk and his affiliates. He also dissed Apple Music for promoting Lil Durk. On May 4, 2023, media personality DJ Akademiks stated that YoungBoy and Durk had reconciled, but on May 8, YoungBoy dissed both Durk and Akademiks on Twitter. On the same day, he announced a new mixtape titled Richest Opp and its release date of May 12, 2023, the intended release date as Durk's album Almost Healed.

== Discography ==
Studio albums

- Remember My Name (2015)
- Lil Durk 2X (2016)
- Signed to the Streets 3 (2018)
- Love Songs 4 the Streets 2 (2019)
- Just Cause Y'all Waited 2 (2020)
- The Voice (2020)
- 7220 (2022)
- Almost Healed (2023)
- Deep Thoughts (2025)

Collaborative albums

- The Voice of the Heroes (with Lil Baby) (2021)

== Awards and nominations ==
Awards and nominations received by Lil Durk
Awards	Year	Category	Nominated Work	Result	Ref.
Grammy Awards	2021	Best Melodic Rap Performance	"Laugh Now Cry Later" (with Drake)	Nominated	
Grammy Awards	2021	Best Rap Song	"Laugh Now Cry Later" (with Drake)	Nominated	
Grammy Awards	2022	Album of the Year	Donda (as a featured artist)	Nominated	
Grammy Awards	2024	Best Melodic Rap Performance	"All My Life" (featuring J. Cole)	Won	

Award	Year	Nominated work		Result	Ref.
iHeartRadio Titanium Award	2022	"Laugh Now Cry Later"	1 Billion Total Audience Spins on iHeartRadio Stations	Won	

Awards	Year	Nominated work	Category	Result	Ref.
NAACP Awards	2021	Outstanding Hip Hop/Rap Song	"Laugh Now Cry Later" (with Drake)	Won	
