= Chopsquad DJ discography =

The discography of American record producer, Chopsquad DJ. It includes a list of songs produced, co-produced and remixed by year, artists, album and title.

== 2014 ==
=== Young Chop – Still ===
- 01. "Still" (featuring Chief Keef) (co-produced with Young Chop)
- 02. "All I Got" (featuring Fat Trel) (co-produced with Young Chop)
- 03. "Valley" (featuring Chief Keef) (co-produced with Young Chop and Chief Keef)
- 04. "Some of Mine" (co-produced with Young Chop and 808 Mafia)
- 06. "Tre 073" (featuring Lil Dave) (co-produced with Young Chop and DP Beats)
- 07. "Never Gonna Change" (featuring YB, J-Rock South, BMore and Johnny May Cash) (co-produced with Young Chop)
- 08. "Ain't Fuckin' With Her" (featuring Ty Dolla Sign and Cap-1) (co-produced with Young Chop)

=== Laudie – Girl Talk ===
- 12. "Tiffany" (featuring Tiffany Foxx)

=== Shy Glizzy – Law 3 ===
- 03. "Anywhere" (featuring 30 Glizzy and 3 Glizzy) (produced with Young Chop)

=== Lucki – X ===
- 10. "Stevie Wonder" (featuring Chance the Rapper) (co-produced with Young Chop, Plu2o Nash and Chance the Rapper)

== 2015 ==
=== Rae Sremmurd – SremmLife ===
- 04. "My X" (co-produced with Young Chop)

=== Lil Durk ===
- 00. "Decline" (featuring Chief Keef) (produced with Young Chop and CBMix)

=== Chief Keef ===
- 00. "Free Throw What?"

=== Chief Keef – Sorry 4 the Weight ===
- 04. "Get Money"
- 06. "F'em"
- 09. "That's What"
- 14. "Send It Up"
- 15. "Hiding"
- 20. "Win"

=== Benji Glo – No Sight No Fear ===
- 04. "Type of Nigga" (featuring Chief Keef)

=== Johnny May Cash – My Last Days ===
- 01. "My Last Days"
- 04. "I'll Solve It" (produced with Asurms)
- 05. "Tacos" (featuring Cash Out) (produced with Young Chop)
- 06. "Where I'm From" (featuring SD) (produced with Young Chop)

=== Lil Bibby ===
- 00. "F.I.L.W.T.P"

=== Chief Keef - The Leek, Vol. 2 ===
- 09. "Doctor"

=== Chief Keef ===
- 00. "Choppers On You"
- 00. "Don't Think I Got One"
- 00. "iCarly"

=== Capo ===
- 00. "Back In the Day" (produced with Jred Beatz and Young Chop)

=== Capo – G.L.O.N.L. 3 ===
- 07. "Let Me Get My Money" (featuring Mass Money Boyz) (produced with Wizz Dakota and Jred Beatz)

=== ManeMane4CGG ===
- 00. "Posted On The Block" (featuring King James and Capo)

=== Johnny May Cash - I'm My Favorite Rapper ===
- 01. "Do This Every Time" (produced with Young Chop)
- 02. "The Lick" (featuring Lil Dave)
- 05. "Steal or Rob" (featuring Rampage)
- 06. "Finesser" (featuring King 100 James)
- 07. "Chasin' These Commas"
- 08. "Pour Up"
- 11. "Must Be My Enemy (featuring J Rock)
- 14. "Steets Love Me" (featuring YB)
- 15. "Pull Up, Hop Out" (featuring J Rock and YB) (produced with Young Chop)

=== Chief Keef – Bang 3 ===
- 01. "Laurel Canyon"
- 03. "Unstoppable"
- 09. "I Just Wanna" (featuring Mac Miller) (produced with Chief Keef)
- 10. "Yes"

=== SD – Just the Beginning ===
- 01. "Just the Beginning" (produced with Young Chop)

=== Chief Keef – Bang 3, Pt. 2 ===
- 02. "Wit It"

=== King B – Write My Wrongs ===
- 06. "Move" (featuring Rich The Kid)

=== Young Chop – Finally Rich Too ===
- 01. "Errrthang"
- 05. "Hittin Foe" (featuring King 100 James) (produced with Metro Boomin)

=== Chopsquad DJ – Forever Chopsquad ===
- 02. "Doctor" (performed by Chief Keef)
- 02. "Say So" (performed by Lil Durk)
- 03. "It's on Me" (performed by Lil Durk featuring Skippa Da Flippa and G Herbo)
- 04. "Mounted Up" (performed by Chief Keef and Lil Durk)
- 05. "Tomorrow (Remix)" (performed by Chief Keef and Lil Durk)
- 06. "Cool" (performed by Chief Keef)
- 07. "1 Foot Forward" (performed by Gucci Mane)
- 08. "Blue Hundreds" (performed by Lil Durk)
- 09. "Turn Up" (performed by Lil Durk)
- 10. "OKC" (performed by Skippa Da Flippa and Migos)
- 11. "On It (Bonus)" (performed by Chief Keef)

=== Lil Durk – 300 Days, 300 Nights ===
- 14. "Nobody"
- 17. "Drug Party"

== 2016 ==
=== Meek Mill – 4/4 Part 2 ===
- 02. "Ricky"

=== Chief Keef – The GloFiles, Pt. 2 ===
- 11. "Face"

=== Trav – Push 3 ===
- 05. "10 of Yours" (featuring Meek Mill)

=== Migo Domingo – War Ready 2 ===
- 02. "With That Shit" (featuring Jose Guapo and Skippa Da Flippa)

=== DJ Bandz – ChiLanta 2 ===
- 02. "Shoot Sum" (performed by Lil Durk)

=== Young Chop – King Chop ===
- 07. "Fool With It" (featuring Lud Foe)

=== Lil Durk – Lil Durk 2X ===
- 04. "She Just Wanna" (featuring Ty Dolla Sign)
- 09. "Set It Off"
- 14. "Good Good" (featuring Kid Ink and Dej Loaf)

=== Lil Durk – They Forgot ===
- 13. "Rich Forever" (featuring YFN Lucci)

=== Yo Gotti – White Friday (CM9) ===
- 06. "They Like"

=== King Louie – Tony 2 ===
- 07. "No Money"

== 2017 ==
=== Lil Lonnie – Vi$ions ===
- 05. "See You On"

=== Lil Durk – Love Songs 4 the Streets ===
- 01. "No Choice"

=== Ethika – RBG ===
- 02. In My (performed by Lil Durk) (co-produced with Young Chop)

=== Tay Capone – 6ixOfEm ===
- 08. "B Rolls" (produced by Metro Boomin)

=== Prince Dre – Only The O In My Eyes ===
- 01. "Only the O"

=== Young Nero – Molly ===
- 04. "We Been on It" (featuring Lil Bibby)

=== Tristan Price ===
- 00. "Hottest"

=== Trouble – 16 ===
- 06. "Royalty" (produced with Dun Deal)

=== Lil Durk & Lil Reese – Supa Vultures ===
- 01. "Distance"
- 03. "Unstoppable"
- 04. "Fuck Dat Shit"
- 06. "Nobody Knows"

=== Lil Lonnie ===
- 00. "IDGAF"

=== Doe Boy – In Freebandz We Trust 2 ===
- 16. "Against Me" (produced with OG Parker)

=== Lil Durk – Signed to the Streets 2.5 ===
- 05. "Too Raw" (produced with DJ Bandz)

=== Q-Sko – We Been Eatin' ===
- 10. "Go Get It" (featuring YoungBoy Never Broke Again)

=== Lil Durk ===
- No Standards

=== Tee Grizzley and Lil Durk – Bloodas ===
- 01. "Bloodas"
- 03. "Category Hoes"
- 04. "3rd Person"
- 07. "Rappers"

== 2018 ==
=== Young Chop – King Chop 2 ===
- 03. "Yea" (featuring Bump J)
- 06. "Set It Off"
- 07. "Slow Down"

=== Zach Smith – February ===
- 01. "Fall Out"

=== Rae Sremmurd – SR3MM ===
- 09. "T'd Up" (co-produced Metro Boomin and Swae Lee)

=== Famous Dex ===
- 00. "Slap a Nigga"

=== Ballout – Glo Glacier ===
- 05. "Different"

=== Swae Lee – Swaecation ===
- 03. "Heat of the Moment"

=== Tee Grizzley – Activated ===
- 06. "Don't Even Trip" (featuring Moneybagg Yo)
- 09. "Bag"
- 10. "Time" (featuring Jeezy)
- 12. "Light" (featuring Lil Yachty)
- 13. "Low"
- 14. "Bloodas 2 Interlude" (featuring Lil Durk)
- 17. "I Remember" (featuring YFN Lucci)
- 18. "On My Own"

=== King Von ===
- 00. "Beat Dat Body" (featuring THF Zoo)

=== Ballout ===
- 00. "Bank" (produced with Metro Boomin)

=== Yung Bans – Yung Bans, Vol. 5 ===
- 01. "Heart So Cold"

=== Trippie Redd – TR666+!$ 1400/800 ===
- 02. "BILAP" (featuring Chief Keef)

=== Arod Somebody – Fed Bound 80 Months ===
- 02. "Trap For Real" (featuring Youngboy Never Broke Again)

=== G Herbo – Swervo ===
- 01. "Some Nights" (produced with Southside)

=== Only the Family – Only the Family Involved, Vol. 1 ===
- 07. "Rockstar" (featuring Yung Tory)
- 13. "Problems" (performed by King Von)

=== Tee Grizzley ===
- No Rap Cap (feat. PnB Rock)

=== Tracy T – Shit Done Changed ===
- 03. "Navigation" (produced with Honorable C.N.O.T.E.)

=== Chief Keef – Back from the Dead 3 ===
- 02. "Just What It Be Like"
- 03. "Vietnam" (produced with Chief Keef)
- 08. "Free Smoke"
- 10. "Jones Indiana" (produced with DY Krazy and Chief Keef)

=== Lil Durk – Signed to the Streets 3 ===
- 02. "Don't Talk To Me" (featuring Gunna) (produced with Wheezy)
- 10. "India, Pt. II" (co-produced with TM88)
- 13. "Benihana" (featuring Kodak Black)
- 14. "I Know"
- 18. "Is What It Is" (produced with Southside)
- 21. "Don't Talk To Me Remix" (featuring Gunna and Juice Wrld) (produced with Wheezy)

=== Trippie Redd – A Love Letter to You 3 ===
- 01. "Topanga"

=== Yung Bans – Yung Bans (2018) ===
01. "Did That Did That"

=== Omelly – Had to Hustle ===
- 07. "Different" (featuring Chief Keef, Ballout and Tadoe)

=== Only the Family – Only the Family Involved, Vol. 2 ===
- 08. "Man Down" (featuring King Von and Lil Durk)

=== 24hrs – B4 XMAS ===
- 05. "Huh" (featuring Chief Keef)

== 2019 ==
=== 24hrs – Valentino Twenty ===
- 04. "Fuck Sum"
- 06. "Carry On" (produced with Dun Deal and MariiBeatz)
- 10. "Backwood"

=== Trippie Redd ===
- 00. "Time To Die" (featuring FreeMoney800)

=== King Von ===
- 00. "Cousins" (featuring JusBlow600)

=== Chopsquad DJ ===
- 00. "I Wish You Would" (featuring Chief Keef)

=== Lil Lonnie – True Colors ===
- 01. "Lord Save Me"
- 03. "On Go"
- 08. "Advantage"

=== Tee Grizzley – Scriptures ===
- 04. "No Talkin" (produced with ATL Jacob and Sim)
- 11. "Overseas"
- 13. "Preach"
- 14. "Young Grizzley World" (featuring YNW Melly and A Boogie wit da Hoodie)

=== YFN Lucci – 650Luc: Gangsta Grillz ===
- 11. Skrrt Skrrt

=== UnoTheActivist – Deadication ===
- 11. "Deadication"

=== Smooky MarGielaa ===
- 00. "Trendsetter"

=== Yung Bans – Misunderstood ===
- 02. "SOS" (produced with Wheezy)
- 15. "Yeaaa!" (featuring Future) (produced with WondaGurl)

=== Booka600 – Word to LA ===
- 08. "Hold You" (produced with Metro Boomin)

=== Lil Durk – Love Songs 4 the Streets 2 ===
- 01. "RN4L"
- 02. "Like That" (produced with DY Krazy)
- 04. "Die Slow" (featuring 21 Savage)
- 10. "Bora Bora"
- 16. "Love Songs 4 the Streets"

=== Trippie Redd – ! ===
- 04. "I Try"
- 05. "They Afraid of You" (featuring Playboi Carti) (produced with G Koop)

=== Swae Lee ===
- 00. "Sextasy" (produced with Mike Will Made It)

=== King Von – Grandson, Vol. 1 ===
- 01. "Went Silly"
- 02. "Tuff"
- 04. "Crazy Story, Pt. 3"
- 07. "No Flaws"
- 08. "What It's Like"
- 09. "Hoes Ain't Shit"
- 10. "War with Us"

=== Slim Santana – Dark Angel ===
- 08. "Darkside"

=== Trippie Redd – A Love Letter to You 4 ===
- 06. "This Ain't That" (featuring Lil Mosey)
- 12. "Sickening" (featuring Tory Lanez) (produced with Mario Peterson and Kzuni)

=== YNW Melly – Melly vs. Melvin ===
01. "Two Face" (co-produced with Dun Deal and MariiBeatz)

=== Fabolous – Summertime Shootout 3: Coldest Summer Ever ===
- 04. "Cap" (featuring Lil Durk) (co-produced with DY Krazy and TM88)

=== Guap Tarantino – Off the Charge ===
- 02. "Hot Box"
- 06. "Go Off"

=== Only The Family and Lil Durk – Family over Everything ===
- 01. "Gang Forever" (With Lil Durk, King Von and JusBlow600)
- 10. "This A Story" (With King Von)

== 2020 ==
=== Sada Baby – Skuba Sada 2 ===
- 09. "Say Whoop"

=== King Von – Levon James ===
- 02. "Took Her to the O"
- 03. "On Yo Ass" (with G Herbo)
- 04. "2 A.M."
- 05. "Down Me" (with Lil Durk) (produced with Ant Chamberlain and Budda Beats)
- 07. "Same as Us"
- 08. "Message" (featuring NLE Choppa)
- 09. "Broke Opps"
- 13. "Str8" (featuring Tee Grizzley)
- 14. "3 A.M."

=== Asian Doll – Doll SZN Reloaded ===
- 06. "Pull Up" (produced with Southside)

=== Sterl Gotti – Jungle Baby Vol. 2 ===
- 02. "Prayers" (produced with DJ Shawdi P, Figurez Made It and Pooh Beatz)

=== Juice Wrld – Legends Never Die ===
- 14. "Wishing Well" (produced with Dr. Luke)

=== B-Win – First Take ===
- 12. "I Tried" (featuring J Rock and Darri)
- 14. "Trap Me" (featuring Darri and Trenchrunner Poodie)

=== King Von – Welcome to O'Block ===
- 01. "Armed & Dangerous"
- 02. "GTA"
- 03. "Demon"
- 06. "Why He Told"
- 09. "All These Niggas" (featuring Lil Durk)
- 10. "Can't Relate"
- 11. "Mad At You" (featuring Dreezy)
- 12. "Ain't See It Coming" (featuring Moneybagg Yo)
- 13. "I Am What I Am" (featuring Fivio Foreign)
- 14. "Ride"
- 15. "How It Go"
- 16. "Wayne's Story"

=== Justin Rarri – Youngest In Kharge ===
- 11. "Left Right" (produced with Nick Mira)

=== Boss Top – Boss Baby ===
- 10. "How We Rock" (featuring JusBlow600)

=== T.I. – The L.I.B.R.A. ===
- 03. "Ring" (featuring Young Thug) (produced with DY Krazy)

=== Trippie Redd – Pegasus ===
- 14. "Good Morning"
- 15. "No Honorable Mention" (with Lil Mosey featuring Quavo) (produced with RMG Nu, FaatKiid, Xeryus)
- 22. "Kid That Didd" (featuring Future and Doe Boy) (produced with CBMix)
- 23. "Don"

=== NLE Choppa – From Dark to Light ===
- 07. "Body Catchers"

=== D. Savage – BPL ===
- 15. "IDC" (featuring Trippie Redd)

=== Blac Youngsta – Fuck Everybody 3 ===
- 05. "Trench Bitch" (featuring Lil Durk)

=== YNW BSlime ===
- 00. "Nightmares" (featuring Trippie Redd)

=== Lil Durk – The Voice ===
- 08. "Free Jamell" (featuring YNW Melly)
- 18. "Finesse Out the Gang Way" (featuring Lil Baby)

== 2021 ==
=== Spence Lee ===
- 00. "Young & Humble" (produced with Mike Will Made It and Myles Harris)

=== Tee Grizzley ===
- 00. "Gave That Back" (with Baby Grizzley)
- 00. "Robbery Part Two"

=== Only the Family – Loyal Bros ===
- 16. "Glaciers" (with Booka600 and Boss Top)

=== Tee Grizzley – Built For Whatever ===
- 02. "Not Gone Play" (featuring King Von)
- 07. "Mad at Us"
- 08. "Life Insurance" (featuring Lil Tjay)
- 11. "High Speed"
- 12. "Never Bend Never Fold" (with G Herbo)
- 17. "Change"
- 18. "Late Night Calls"

=== Mozzy – Untreated Trauma ===
- 07. "Slimey" (produced by Pooh Beatz)

=== YNW BSlime ===
- 00. "Citi Trends" (featuring NLE Choppa)

=== Fetty Wap – The Butterfly Effect ===
- 02. "Out the Hood"
- 10. "Got A Bag"

=== Polo G – Hall of Fame 2.0 ===
- 13. "Piano G"

== 2022 ==
=== Chris King – MUCUS (Deluxe) ===
- 24. DO WITH YOU (featuring Trippie Redd)

=== King Von – What It Means to Be King ===
- 01. "Where I'm From"
- 02. "War"
- 05. "Straight To It"
- 06. "Trust Nothing" (featuring Moneybagg Yo)
- 10. "Mad"
- 11. "My Fault" (with A Boogie wit da Hoodie)
- 12. "Change My Life"
- 14. "Get Back" (with Boss Top, DqFrmDaO)
- 15. "Get It Done" (with OMB Peezy)
- 18. "Grandson For President"

=== Lil Durk – 7220 ===
- 09. What Happened To Virgil (featuring Gunna)

=== Tee Grizzley – Half Tee Half Beast ===
01. "Half Tee Half Beast" (produced with J.R. Rotem)

=== Lil Tjay ===
- 00. "Goin Up"

=== Tee Grizzley – Chapters of the Trenches ===
- 13. "Free Baby Grizz Part 3"

=== Blue Bucks Clan – Clan Way 3 ===
- 02. "Can't Believe It" (produced with Zaytoven)
- 03. "Let Me Know (featuring Jeremih) (produced with JetsonMade, Ten11 and Baby Bleeder)
- 04. "Add It Up" (produced with Go Grizzly)
- 13. "Party" (produced with Honorable C.N.O.T.E. and JetsonMade)

=== Only the Family – Loyal Bros 2 ===
- 03. "Hanging With Wolves" (performed by Lil Durk) (produced with Jkari, Nile Waves and DecayOnTheBeat)
- 07. "Feed Em Addy's" (performed by Booka600 and Lil Durk)
- 12. "Mad Cuz I'm Rich" (performed by THF Zoo and Big30)

== 2023 ==
=== Trippie Redd – Mansion Musik ===
- 13. "High Hopes (with Big30) (produced with Igor Mamet)
- 20. "Pure" (with G Herbo) (produced with Igor Mamet)

=== Booka600 – Somebody Save Me ===
- 05. "No More"

=== Flo Milli ===
- 00. "Einstein"

=== Rae Sremmurd – Sremm 4 Life ===
- 02. "Royal Flush" (featuring Young Thug) (produced with Mike Will Made It and Cubeatz)

=== NLE Choppa – Cottonwood 2 ===
- 24. "Clyde & Dodo" (featuring Gino 2x) (produced with Real Red)

=== Tee Grizzley & Skilla Baby – Controversy ===
- 11. "Grizzley Camp"
- 12. "B&E, Pt. 1"

=== Drakeo the Ruler & Blue Bucks Clan – Legendary ===
- 06. "Used To"
- 07. "Digits" (produced with Axl Folie)
- 08. "Pick It Up"

=== DD Osama – Here 2 Stay ===
- 01. "What We Doin" (featuring Lil Zay Osama and HoodStarDotty)

=== Lil Durk – Almost Healed ===
- 02. "Pelle Coat"
- 04. "Never Again"
- 05. "Put Em On Ice"
- 07. "Never Imagined" (featuring Future)

=== King Von – Grandson ===
- 03. "HitMan"
- 06. "From The Hood" (with Lil Durk)
- 07. "Pressure" (produced with Twysted Genius)
- 09. "Heartless" (with Tee Grizzley) (produced with DJ Bandz)
- 11. "Act Up"
- 12. "Think I'm A Hoe"
- 13. "All We Do Is Drill"
- 15. "Out Of The Streets" (featuring Moneybagg Yo and HotBoii)
- 16. "When I Die"

=== Goldie14 ===
- 00. "Cuttin Up" (featuring Trippie Redd)
