= Tee's Coney Island =

Studio album by Tee Grizzley
- Released: November 3, 2023
- Genre: Hip-hop
- Length: 45:21; 55:13 (Deluxe edition)
- Label: Grizzley Gang; 300
- Producer: 43.elijah; Antt Beatz; BanBwoi; BlueStrip; Chopsquad DJ; Dro; Helluva; Hitmaka; J. R. Rotem; Mia JC; Nick Papz; Olli P; ProdbyKaio; Tay Keith; Twizz; Unicus; Wayne616

Tee Grizzley chronology
Controversy (2023)	Tee's Coney Island (2023)	Post Traumatic (2024)

Deluxe edition cover

Singles from Tee's Coney Island
- 1. "IDGAF" Released: September 8, 2023; 2. "Grizzley 2Tymes" Released: October 7, 2023; 3. "Robbery 6" Released: October 24, 2023

Tee's Coney Island is the fourth studio album by American rapper Tee Grizzley. It was released on November 3, 2023, by Grizzley Gang and 300 Entertainment. Production was handled by various producers including Chopsquad DJ, Helluva, Hitmaka, J. R. Rotem and Tay Keith. The album features guest appearances by 21 Savage, Chris Brown, City Girls, Cordae, Finesse2tymes, Machine Gun Kelly, Mariah the Scientist and Skilla Baby. The deluxe edition of the album was released four days later and includes four new songs with features by Kash Doll, Lil Yachty, Mozzy and late PnB Rock.

Tee's Coney Island was preceded by three singles; "IDGAF", "Grizzley 2Tymes" and "Robbery 6".

== Background ==
The cover art and the title of the album were inspired by Tee Grizzley's childhood neighborhood in Detroit.

== Composition ==
According to Shawn Grant of The Source, the lyrical content of Tee's Coney Island focuses “on classic street narratives and the kind of gritty poetry that first put him in the spotlight with his quadruple-platinum hit, "First Day Out"”. Musically, most of the album displays Grizzley's "Detroit style", along with some tracks featuring "additional versatility and sounds", including Afrobeats influences on "City of God", and R&B on "IDGAF".

== Critical reception ==
Professional ratings
Review scores
Source	Rating
AllMusic	3.5/5 stars

TiVo Staff of AllMusic defined the album “another full-force steamroll of his larger-than-life presence, bolstered by features from many of the industry's finest”.

== Track listing ==
Tee's Coney Island track listing
No.	Title	Writer(s)	Producer(s)	Length
1.	"Ain't Nothing New"	Terry Wallace, Jr.; Martin McCurtis; Arkesha Antoinette Knight	Helluva	2:21
2.	"Floaters"	Wallace; Dwayne William Moore II	Wayne616	1:50
3.	"Loop Hole" (featuring 21 Savage)	Wallace; Shéyaa Bin Abraham-Joseph; Christian Ward; Brytavious Lakeith Chambers; Nikolas Papamitrou; Marquell Ushon Jones	Hitmaka; Tay Keith; Nick Papz; BanBwoi	2:31
4.	"City of God" (featuring Chris Brown)	Wallace; Christopher Maurice Brown; Leandro Hidalgo	Dro	2:15
5.	"One of One"	Wallace; Ward; Joshua White	Hitmaka; Mia JC	2:12
6.	"The Sopranos" (featuring Machine Gun Kelly)	Wallace; Colson Baker; McCurtis; Leonardo Boston	Hitmaka; Unicus	3:12
7.	"Off the Top"	Wallace; McCurtis; Moore	Helluva; Wayne616; 43.elijah	1:58
8.	"3 Sports"	Wallace; Moore	Wayne616	2:03
9.	"Grizzley 2Tymes" (featuring Finesse2tymes)	Wallace; Ricky Hampton; Ward; McCurtis	Hitmaka; Helluva	2:46
10.	"Fight This Case"	Wallace; Jonathan Reuven Rotem	J. R. Rotem	2:42
11.	"IDGAF" (featuring Chris Brown and Mariah the Scientist)	Wallace; Brown; Mariah Amani Buckles; Darrell Gregory Jackson	Chopsquad DJ	3:15
12.	"Tried and Tried Again" (featuring Cordae)	Wallace; Cordae Amari Dunston; McCurtis; Anthony Matis	Helluva; Antt Beats	2:18
13.	"I Love Tee"	Wallace; Moore	Wayne616	2:45
14.	"Robbery 6"	Wallace; Rotem	Rotem	5:02
15.	"Gorgeous" (Remix; with Skilla Baby featuring City Girls)	Wallace; Trevon Gardner; Caresha Romeka Brownlee; Jatavia Shakara Johnson; McCurtis	Helluva; ProdbyKaio	3:34
16.	"Charles Brown"	Wallace; McCurtis; Oliver Berg Pletten	Helluva; Olli P; Twizz	4:29
Total length:				45:21

Deluxe edition bonus tracks
No.	Title	Writer(s)	Producer(s)	Length
17.	"What's That?" (featuring PnB Rock)	Wallace; Rakim Hasheem Allen; McCurtis	Helluva	2:33
18.	"Walked Down" (featuring Lil Yachty)	Wallace; Miles Parks McCollum; Mathis	Antt Beats	2:14
19.	"Green Text" (featuring Kash Doll)	Wallace; Knight; McCurtis; White	Helluva; Mia JC	2:23
20.	"Tried and Tried Again" (Remix, featuring Mozzy and Cordae)	Wallace; Dunston; McCurtis; Mathis	Helluva; Antt Beats	2:39
Total length:				55:13

== Personnel ==
- Tee Grizzley – vocals
- Mike Tucci – mastering
- Patrizio "Teezio" Pigliapoco – mixing
- Shaan Singh – recording
- Ignacio Portales – mixing assistance
- Krishna Jhaveri – recording (tracks 12, 20)

== Charts ==
Chart performance for Tee's Coney Island
Chart (2023)	Peak position
US Billboard 200	65
US Top R&B/Hip-Hop Albums (Billboard)	24
US Top Rap Albums (Billboard)	20
