= Post Traumatic (Tee Grizzley album) =

Studio album by Tee Grizzley
- Released: October 4, 2024
- Genre: Hip-hop
- Length: 69:46
- Label: Grizzley Gang; 300
- Producer: Aaron Bow; Bnyx; Chopsquad DJ; FnZ; Helluva; Oz; Pi'erre Bourne; Teddy Walton; Wheezy; Aidan Brody; BB; Bizness Boi; DJ SIDEREAL; Gedo; Geovocals; Hawky; Jorge Luis Ocampo; Juke Wong; K6; Keanen Self; Kvrim; Levi Bandito; MOJVKI; Musik MajorX; Musik Spirit; Oh Gosh Leotus; Oz on the Track; PresPlay; Primo Beats; Reuel StopPlaying; Rizzo; SephGotTheWaves; Tymaz; Unicus; vs; Whitlock; Xeryus Gittens

Tee Grizzley chronology
Tee's Coney Island (2023)	Post Traumatic (2024)	Forever My Moment (2025)

Singles from Post Traumatic
- 1. "Suffer In Silence" Released: April 19, 2024; 2. "Swear to God" Released: May 10, 2024; 3. "Robbery 7" Released: June 21, 2024; 4. "Detroit" Released: August 23, 2024; 5. "Blow for Blow" Released: September 27, 2024; 6. "Robbery 8" Released: October 4, 2024

Post Traumatic is the fifth studio album by American rapper Tee Grizzley. It was released on October 4, 2024, by Grizzley Gang and 300 Entertainment. The album features notable guest appearances by 42 Dugg, Fridayy, Future, G Herbo, Hunxho, J. Cole and Mariah the Scientist. Production was handled by various producers including Bnyx, Chopsquad DJ, FnZ, Helluva, Pi'erre Bourne, Teddy Walton and Wheezy.

== Background ==
On April 19, 2024, Tee Grizzley released the first single of the album titled "Suffer in Silence".

On May 10, 2024, he released the second single of the album, "Swear to God", which features American rapper Future.

On June 21, 2024, Tee Grizzley released the third single of the album, "Robbery 7".

On August 23, 2024, he released the fourth single of the album titled "Detroit", which features 42 Dugg.

On September 27, 2024, he released the fifth single of the album titled "Blow for Blow", which features J. Cole.

On October 4, 2024, he released the sixth single of the album titled "Robbery 8".

== Track listing ==
Post Traumatic track listing
No.	Title	Writer(s)	Producer(s)	Length
1.	"Post Traumatic"	Terry Sanchez Wallace Jr.; Reuel Walker; Dante Primo	Primo Beats; Reuel StopPlaying	2:07
2.	"We Dem"	T. Wallace; Wesley Glass	Wheezy	2:01
3.	"Blow for Blow" (featuring J. Cole)	T. Wallace; Jermaine Cole; Jordan Jenks; Bernard Edwards; Nile Rodgers; Sean Combs; Christopher Wallace; Mason Betha; Steven Jordan	Pi'erre Bourne	3:30
4.	"All I Wanna Do"	T. Wallace; Michael Mulé; Isaac De Boni; Aaron Booe; Travis Walton; Richard Davis; Stevie Robinson; Terry Marshall	FnZ; Aaron Bow; Teddy Walton	2:06
5.	"More Than Half"	T. Wallace; Martin McCurtis	Helluva	1:44
6.	"Ride or Die" (featuring Tink)	T. Wallace; Trinity Home; Quinton Cook; Walker; James Scheffer; Stephen Garrett Jr.; Derrick Baker; Spectacular Smith; Marcus Cooper; Joseph Smith; Corey Mathis; Diamond Smith	Musik MajorX; Reuel StopPlaying	2:59
7.	"Diana"	T. Wallace; Ariel Lopez; Benjamin Saint Fort; Brittany Hazzard	Presplay; Bnyx	1:10
8.	"I Ain't Sorry" (featuring Hunxho)	T. Wallace; Ibrahim Dodo; Darrell Jackson	Chopsquad DJ	3:05
9.	"10pm in Detroit"	T. Wallace; Walker	Reuel StopPlaying	1:43
10.	"Swerv" (featuring G Herbo)	T. Wallace; Herbert Wright III	Oz on the Track	3:13
11.	"WTF I Want"	T. Wallace; McCurtis; Leonardo Bostan	vs; Helluva; Unicus	2:20
12.	"I Know" (featuring Fridayy)	T. Wallace; Francis Leblanc; Hazzard; Aidan Brody; Mariah Martinez; Saintiler Saint; Leonardo Pierre; Dana Portalatin	Brody; Musik Spirit; Kvrim	3:51
13.	"Dream Youngin"	T. Wallace; Leoren Davis; Andre Robertson; Walker; Xeryus Gittens	Oh Gosh Leotus; Bizness Boi; Reuel StopPlaying; Gittens	2:16
14.	"Situationship" (with Mariah the Scientist)	T. Wallace; Mariah Buckles; Walker; Cook	Reuel StopPlaying; SephGotTheWaves; Geovocals; Musik MajorX	3:12
15.	"Trench Baby"	T. Wallace; Walker	Reuel StopPlaying	2:28
16.	"You Hear Me" (featuring YTB Fatt)	T. Wallace; Cavon Paige; Samuel Matthew; Lychkin Vladimirovich; Levi Owen	DJ Sidereal; Gedo; Levi Bandito; Rizzo	3:07
17.	"Swear to God" (featuring Future)	T. Wallace; Nayvadius Cash; Glass	Juke Wong; Wheezy	3:00
18.	"Pop Shit" (featuring Baby Grizzley)	T. Wallace; Marcellus Wallace	BB; Helluva	3:49
19.	"Deposits Crazy"	T. Wallace; Matthew; Owen; Oscar Garcia	DJ Sidereal; Hawky; Levi Bandito; Tymaz	2:09
20.	"Detroit" (featuring 42 Dugg)	T. Wallace; Dion Hayes; McCurtis	Helluva	2:30
21.	"Blueprint"	T. Wallace; Ozan Yildirim; Mulé; De Boni; Molemo Mojaki	Oz; FnZ; Mojvki	2:24
22.	"Suffer in Silence"	T. Wallace; Jackson	Chopsquad DJ	2:37
23.	"Robbery 7"	T. Wallace; McCurtis; Jorge Luis Ocampo; Keanen Self	Helluva; Luis Ocampo; Self	3:44
24.	"Robbery 8"	T. Wallace; McCurtis; Bostan	Helluva; Whitlock; Unicus; K6	8:37
Total length:				69:46

=== Notes ===
- "Blow for Blow" contains an interpolation of "Mo Money Mo Problems", written by Sean Combs, Christopher Wallace, Bernard Edwards, Nile Rodgers, Mason Betha and Steven Jordan, as performed by the Notorious B.I.G. featuring Puff Daddy and Mase.
- "Ride or Die" contains an interpolation of "Your Body", written by Diamond Smith, Spectacular Smith, Joseph Smith, Marcus Cooper, Corey Mathis, James Scheffer, Derrick Baker and Stephen Garrett, and performed by Pretty Ricky.

== Personnel ==
- Tee Grizzley – vocals
- Mike Tucci – mastering (all tracks), immersive mastering (track 22)
- Patrizio "Teezio" Pigliapoco – mixing (tracks 1–13, 15–22), immersive mastering (1–21, 24)
- Shaan Singh – mixing (tracks 14, 23)
- Zadra – mixing, engineering (track 23)
- Federico Portales – immersive mastering (tracks 1–16, 18–21, 24), mixing assistance (1–8, 10–12, 14–16, 18–21, 24)
- Ignacio Portales – immersive mastering (tracks 1–16, 18–21, 24), mixing assistance (1–16, 18–21, 24)
- J. Cole – vocals (track 3)
- Dre Butterz – engineering (track 3)
- Tink – vocals (track 6)
- Hunxho – vocals (track 8)
- G Herbo – vocals (track 10)
- Fridayy – vocals (track 12)
- Mariah the Scientist – vocals (track 14)
- YTB Fatt – vocals (track 16)
- Future – vocals (track 17)
- Baby Grizzley – vocals (track 18)
- 42 Dugg – vocals (track 20)

== Charts ==
Chart performance for Post Traumatic
Chart (2024)	Peak position
US Billboard 200	60
US Top R&B/Hip-Hop Albums (Billboard)	20
