= Satish (song) =

Single by Tee Grizzley

from the album The Smartest
- Released: September 20, 2019
- Length: 3:16
- Label: 300
- Songwriters: Terry Sanchez Wallace Jr.; Helluva Beats
- Producers: Tee Grizzley; Helluva Beats

Tee Grizzley singles chronology
"Sweet Thangs" (2019)	"Satish" (2019)	"Teetroit the Smartest" (2020)

Music video
- "Satish" on YouTube

"Satish" is a song by American rapper Tee Grizzley, released on September 20, 2019, as the lead single from his album The Smartest, through the label Grizzley Gang Music Group.

== Background ==
On August 20, 2019, Tee Grizzley's aunt and manager, Jobina Satish Brown was murdered in Detroit, Michigan when a gunman approached Grizzley's car and opened fire. Brown was sitting in the back seat. The name of the song, "Satish", comes from Brown's middle name. Throughout the song, Grizzley raps about his grief for the loss of his aunt and expresses his anger towards her killer.

== Charts ==
Chart (2019)	Peak position
US Bubbling Under Hot 100 (Billboard)	2
US Hot R&B/Hip-Hop Songs (Billboard)	48
US Rolling Stone Top 100	52

== Certifications ==
Region	Certification	Certified units/sales
United States (RIAA)	Gold	500,000^{‡}
^{‡} Sales+streaming figures based on certification alone.
