= 2017 BET Hip Hop Awards =

Annual edition of the awards show

- Date: October 6, 2017
- Location: Jackie Gleason Theater, The Fillmore Miami Beach
- Hosted by: DJ Khaled

The 2017 BET Hip Hop Awards are a recognition ceremony held October 6 at the Fillmore Miami Beach at Jackie Gleason Theater in Miami Beach, Florida, and aired October 10 on the BET cable channel. The nominations were announced on September 15, 2017.

Kendrick Lamar, DJ Khaled, and Cardi B led the BET Hip-Hop Awards 2017 with nine nominations apiece. Kendrick and Cardi B tied for MVP of the Year, Single of the Year, Hustler of the Year, and Best Hip-Hop Video. Meanwhile, Khaled was out for the crown in the DJ of the Year, Best Hip-Hop Video, and Producer of the Year categories.

JAY-Z and Chance the Rapper were tied for the second-most nominations with five nods each. Both were nominated in categories like Lyricist of the Year, MVP of the Year, and Impact Track. Elsewhere, Future and Migos received four nominations apiece.

The show was notable for Eminem's slamming of Donald Trump in a freestyle rap, calling out the President for focusing on National Football League players' protests during "The Star Spangled Banner" instead of Puerto Rico's recovery efforts in the wake of Hurricane Maria, and delivering an ultimatum to Trump supporters who are also fans of the rapper to choose between the two of them.

== Cyphers ==
- Cypher 1 - Ball Greezy, Denzel Curry, Ski Mask the Slump God, & Zoey Dollaz
- Cypher 2 - Fat Joe, Cyhi the Prynce, Belly
- Cypher 3 - JID, Ali Tomineek, Cozz, Kodie Shane
- Cypher 4 - Tee Grizzley, Little Simz, 6LACK, Mysonne, Axel Leon
- Cypher 5 - Eminem
- Digital Cypher - Griselda, Boogie, Westside Gunn, Conway, Benny

== Nominations ==
Winners highlighted in Bold

=== Best Hip Hop Video ===
Kendrick Lamar – "HUMBLE."

- Cardi B – "Bodak Yellow"
- DJ Khaled featuring Rihanna and Bryson Tiller – "Wild Thoughts"
- French Montana featuring Swae Lee – "Unforgettable"
- Future – "Mask Off"

=== Best Collabo, Duo or Group ===
DJ Khaled featuring Rihanna and Bryson Tiller – "Wild Thoughts"

- French Montana featuring Swae Lee – "Unforgettable"
- Migos featuring Lil Uzi Vert – "Bad and Boujee"
- Rae Sremmurd featuring Gucci Mane – "Black Beatles"
- Yo Gotti featuring Nicki Minaj – "Rake It Up"

=== Hot Ticket Performer ===
Kendrick Lamar

- Cardi B
- Chance the Rapper
- Drake
- J. Cole

=== Lyricist of the Year ===
Kendrick Lamar

- Chance the Rapper
- Drake
- J. Cole
- JAY-Z

=== Video Director of the Year ===
Benny Boom

- Colin Tilley
- Dave Meyers & Missy Elliott
- Director X
- Hype Williams

=== DJ of the Year ===
DJ Khaled

- DJ Drama
- DJ Envy
- DJ Esco
- DJ Mustard

=== Producer of the Year ===
Metro Boomin

- DJ Khaled & Nasty Beatmakers
- DJ Mustard
- London On Da Track
- Mike WiLL Made It
- Pharrell Williams

=== MVP of the Year ===
DJ Khaled

- Cardi B
- Chance the Rapper
- JAY-Z
- Kendrick Lamar

=== Single of the Year ===
Only the producer of the track nominated in this category.

"Bodak Yellow" – Produced by J. White Did It (Cardi B)

- "Bad and Boujee" – Produced by Metro Boomin (Migos featuring Lil Uzi Vert)
- "HUMBLE." – Produced by Mike Will Made-It (Kendrick Lamar)
- "Mask Off" – Produced by Metro Boomin (Future)
- "Wild Thoughts" – Produced by DJ Khaled & Nasty Beatmakers (DJ Khaled featuring Rihanna and Bryson Tiller)

=== Album of the Year ===
Kendrick Lamar – Damn

- DJ Khaled – Grateful
- Future – Future
- J. Cole – 4 Your Eyez Only
- JAY-Z – 4:44
- Migos – Culture

=== Best New Hip Hop Artist ===
Cardi B

- Aminé
- Kodak Black
- Playboi Carti
- Tee Grizzley

=== Hustler of the Year ===
Cardi B

- Chance the Rapper
- Diddy
- DJ Khaled
- JAY-Z
- Kendrick Lamar

=== Made-You-Look Award (Best Hip Hop Style) ===
Cardi B

- A$AP Rocky
- Future
- Migos
- Nicki Minaj

=== Best Mixtape ===
Cardi B – Gangsta Bitch Music, Vol. 2

- Gucci Mane – Droptopwop
- Juicy J – Gas Face
- Playboi Carti – Playboi Carti
- Tee Grizzley – My Moment
- Yo Gotti & Mike Will Made-It – Gotti Made-It

=== Sweet 16: Best Featured Verse ===
Nicki Minaj – "Rake It Up" (Yo Gotti featuring Nicki Minaj)

- Chance the Rapper – "I'm the One" (DJ Khaled featuring Justin Bieber, Quavo, Chance the Rapper and Lil Wayne)
- Gucci Mane – "Black Beatles" (Rae Sremmurd featuring Gucci Mane)
- Lil Uzi Vert – "Bad and Boujee" (Migos featuring Lil Uzi Vert)
- Ty Dolla $ign – "Ain't Nothing" (Juicy J featuring Wiz Khalifa & Ty Dolla $ign)
- Wiz Khalifa – "Ain't Nothing" (Juicy J featuring Wiz Khalifa & Ty Dolla $ign)

=== Impact Track ===
Jay-Z – "The Story of O.J."

- Cardi B – "Bodak Yellow"
- Kendrick Lamar – "HUMBLE."
- Kendrick Lamar – "DNA."
- Lecrae featuring Ty Dolla $ign – "Blessings"
- Tyler, The Creator featuring A$AP Rocky – "Who Dat Boy"
- Nicki Minaj ft. Lil Wayne & Drake - No Frauds

=== I Am Hip Hop Icon ===
Luther Campbell

== Instabooth Freestyles ==
Most freestyles via BET and their YouTube channel.

=== Participants ===
- DJ Khaled and Asahd Khaled
- Big Tigger
- Millyz
- Dave East
- Bre-Z
- ASAP Ferg
- T-Pain
- Tammy Rivera
- Waka Flocka Flame
- Michael Dapaah (Big Shaq)
- Jasmin Brown (WatchJazzy)
- Vince Swann
- Tristen Winger
- Mysonne
- Cozz
- Tee Grizzley
- XXXTentacion
- Zoey Dollaz
- YFN Lucci
- King Combs
- Michael Blackson
- Axel Leon
- Mike Smiff
- Dee-1
- Lil Flip
