= Little Rock shooting =

Little Rock shooting may refer to:

- Little Rock recruiting office shooting (2009)
- Little Rock nightclub shooting (2017)
