= The Smartest =

Mixtape by Tee Grizzley
- Released: June 19, 2020
- Length: 45:22
- Label: 300
- Producers: Avedon; Cypress; Diego Ave; DJ Mustard; GYLTTRYP; Helluva; Hit-Boy; ModMaxx; Omega; P-Lo; Scott Storch; VYNK

Tee Grizzley chronology
Scriptures (2019)	The Smartest (2020)	Built for Whatever (2021)

Singles from The Smartest
- 1. "Satish" Released: September 20, 2019; 2. "Mr. Officer" Released: June 4, 2020

Professional ratings
Review scores
Source	Rating
AllMusic	3.5/5 stars
HipHopDX	3.6/5

The Smartest is the third commercial mixtape by American rapper Tee Grizzley. It was released on June 19, 2020, via 300 Entertainment. The mixtape features guest appearances from Big Sean, Lil Baby, Lil Keed, Meek Mill, Queen Naija and members of Detroit Youth Choir. Production was handled by several record producers, including Hit-Boy, Avedon, Helluva, Mustard, P-Lo and Scott Storch.

The mixtape peaked at number 22 on the Billboard 200. It was promoted by two singles: "Satish" and "Mr. Officer".

== Track listing ==
No.	Title	Writer(s)	Producer(s)	Length
1.	"The Smartest"	Terry Wallace, Jr.; Dijon McFarlane; Shah Rukh Zaman Khan	Mustard; Gylttryp	3:04
2.	"I Apologize"	Wallace; Chauncey Hollis, Jr.	Hit-Boy	3:17
3.	"Trenches" (featuring Big Sean)	Wallace; Sean Anderson; Hollis	Hit-Boy	2:36
4.	"Rap a Lot"	Wallace; Vincent van den Ende; Vynk	Avedon; VYNK^{[a]}	3:01
5.	"The Funeral"	Wallace; Martin McCurtis	Helluva	2:12
6.	"Lions & Eagles" (featuring Meek Mill)	Wallace; Robert Williams; Cypress Moreno; Omega	Cypress; Omega	2:30
7.	"No Witness"	Wallace; van den Ende; Vynk	Avedon; Vynk^{[a]}	2:25
8.	"Picture of My City"	Wallace; Scott Storch; Diego Avendano	Storch; Diego Ave	2:35
9.	"Covid" (featuring Lil Baby)	Wallace; Dominique Jones; van den Ende; Vynk	Avedon	2:27
10.	"Timeless"	Wallace; Hollis	Hit-Boy	2:21
11.	"Slime" (featuring Lil Keed)	Wallace; Raqhid Render; Maxwell Zarnoch	ModMaxx	2:57
12.	"Everything"	Wallace; Paulo Rodriguez	P-Lo	1:53
13.	"Double Standards"	Wallace; Hollis	Hit-Boy	2:20
14.	"Daylight"	Wallace; Hollis	Hit-Boy	2:45
15.	"Winning"	Wallace; van den Ende; Vynk	Avedon; VYNK^{[a]}	2:35
16.	"Satish"	Wallace; McCurtis	Helluva	3:15
17.	"Mr. Officer" (featuring Queen Naija and members of Detroit Youth Choir)	Wallace; Naija Bulls; Sean Matthews; McCurtis	Helluva	2:58
Total length:				45:22

Notes

- ^{^[a]} signifies a co-producer

== Charts ==
Chart (2020)	Peak position
Canadian Albums (Billboard)	88
US Billboard 200	22
US Top R&B/Hip-Hop Albums (Billboard)	14
US Top Rap Albums (Billboard)	11
