= Blow for Blow =

2024 single by Tee Grizzley featuring J. Cole

Single by Tee Grizzley featuring J. Cole

from the album Post Traumatic
- Released: September 27, 2024
- Genre: Hip hop
- Length: 3:30
- Label: Grizzley Gang; 300
- Songwriters: Terry Wallace Jr.; Jermaine Cole; Jordan Jenks; Bernard Edwards; Nile Rodgers; Christopher Wallace; Sean Combs; Mason Betha; Steven Jordan
- Producer: Pi'erre Bourne

Tee Grizzley singles chronology
"Detroit" (2024)	"Blow for Blow" (2024)	"Situationship" (2024)

J. Cole singles chronology
"A Plate of Collard Greens" (2024)	"Blow for Blow" (2024)	"Port Antonio" (2024)

Music video
- "Blow for Blow" on YouTube

"Blow for Blow" is a song by American rapper Tee Grizzley featuring fellow American rapper J. Cole, released on September 27, 2024, as the fifth single from the former's fifth studio album, Post Traumatic (2024). It was produced by Pi'erre Bourne.

== Background ==
With respect to connecting with J. Cole, Tee Grizzley told Complex:

It's crazy. When you talk about somebody processing how they work, J. Cole is somebody who the process means everything [to him]. Process mean everything, the energy mean everything. The vibe, if it ain't right, it's like "We can't do it." So it kind of took us a while because we had to find the right thing that was perfect for us to do. And once we found it, bro, I just knew it was the one, and I know that Cole is super talented, so I couldn't half-step when it came to how I performed on the song. So I gave it my all.

Pi'erre Bourne produced the beat under Cole's choice. Cole recorded his verse on his own and sent it to Grizzley, who did not change his own verse after hearing it.

== Composition and lyrics ==
Over production consisting of a synth loop and 808s, the song begins with a verse from J. Cole, who first asserts that he is one of the best rappers of the generation and catches attention by his performances on features instead of ostentatious outfits ("Blow for blow, Cole flow just prestigious / Sweats and tees, no unnecessary accessories, the GOAT just from features / Proceed with throat-cut procedures"). Later on, he likens himself to K-pop group BTS as regards his success, references media personality and former decathlete Caitlyn Jenner's gender transition (deadnaming her as well) and uses a pun referencing rapper LL Cool J. In the chorus, Cole interpolates Mase's verse on the song "Mo' Money, Mo' Problems" by The Notorious B.I.G. ("Now, who hot? Who not? / Tell me, who flopped? Who sell out the tours?"). Tee Grizzley performs the second verse, in which he affirms superiority in the industry as well and asks his critics to consider his difficult life before judging him, narrating his background of growing up in an environment surrounded by drugs and violence, attending college, being incarcerated for armed robbery and subsequently releasing his hit song "First Day Out".

== Critical reception ==
Elias Andrews of HotNewHipHop remarked that J. Cole's "wordplay is superb" and "He's got clever bars about LL Cool J", additionally writing "Tee Grizzley doesn't have the bars that Cole does, but he makes up for it with charisma. He sounds great over the chilled out beat. He also manages to drop some funny lines about the nastiness of his chain and his cars." Shawn Grant of The Source described Cole as "bodying the beat with raz0r-sharp rhymes" and commented Grizzley "delivers a showstopping series of bars".

== Music video ==
The music video premiered alongside the single. Directed by Jerry Production, it sees Tee Grizzley and J. Cole rapping on a rooftop against the skyline of New York City. Grizzley also gives out hundred dollar bills to people in a neighborhood.

== Charts ==
Chart performance for "Blow for Blow"
Chart (2024)	Peak position
New Zealand Hot Singles (RMNZ)	3
US Billboard Hot 100	88
US Hot R&B/Hip-Hop Songs (Billboard)	23
