= Activated (album) =

Studio album by Tee Grizzley
- Released: May 11, 2018
- Genres: Hip-hop; trap
- Length: 60:54
- Label: 300
- Producers: Chopsquad DJ (also exec.); Helluva; Infamous Rell; London on da Track; The Breed; The Olympicks

Tee Grizzley chronology
Bloodas (2017)	Activated (2018)	Still My Moment (2018)

Singles from Activated
- 1. "Colors" Released: February 2, 2018; 2. "Don't Even Trip" Released: March 14, 2018

Activated is the debut studio album by American rapper Tee Grizzley. It was released on May 11, 2018, by 300 Entertainment. The album features guest appearances from Lil Yachty, Lil Pump, Chris Brown, Moneybagg Yo, Lil Durk, and YFN Lucci, among others. The production on the album was handled by Helluva, London on da Track, The Breed, Chopsquad DJ, The Olympicks, and Infamous Rell. The album was supported by two singles: "Colors" and "Don't Even Trip".

== Background ==
In a statement by Tee Grizzley, he explained the significance of the album title, by stating:

My whole life I saw everybody else get shine. I saw everybody else get money, everybody else wanted to rap. I saw them getting record deals and stuff like that. Every time I saw that it was, 'Damn, I can't wait until my time. My time is coming'. I was so patient and I finally got my time. I finally got my money, I finally got my fans and plaques, and my moment. When I got my moment, that’s when I Activated.

In another statement the rapper explained the potential impact of the album, by stating:

I feel like Activated is going to be bad for a lot of rappers because they're not going to be able to get by with all the BS they've been getting away with. I really hope that they enjoy themselves and have fun and get their shine on because when Activated drops, it's over with.

On April 17, 2018, Tee Grizzley was featured on Zane Lowe's Beats 1 Radio show, in which he revealed some of the guests slated to appear on the album, along with the album's release date.

== Singles ==
The album's lead single, "Colors", was released for digital download on February 2, 2018, along with the Nick Margetic and Everett Stewart-directed music video. The song was produced by Helluva.

The album's second single, "Don't Even Trip" featuring Moneybagg Yo, was released on March 14, 2018. The song was produced by Chopsquad DJ. The Everett Stewart-directed music video was released on April 18, 2018.

=== Promotional singles ===
The album's first promotional single, "2 Vaults" featuring Lil Yachty was released on March 15, 2018. The song was produced by London on da Track. The album's second promotional single, "Fuck It Off" featuring Chris Brown was released on May 4, 2018. The song was produced by Helluva.

== Commercial performance ==
Activated debuted at number 10 on the US Billboard 200 chart, earning 27,000 album-equivalent units (including 4,000 copies of pure album sales) in its first week. This became Tee Grizzley's first US top 10 album.

== Track listing ==
No.	Title	Writer(s)	Producer(s)	Length
1.	"Activated"	Terry Wallace; Martin McCurtis	Helluva	3:06
2.	"2 Vaults" (featuring Lil Yachty)	Wallace; London Holmes; Miles McCollum	London on da Track	3:30
3.	"Jetski Grizzley" (featuring Lil Pump)	Wallace; McCurtis; Gazzy Garcia	Helluva	2:43
4.	"Set the Record Straight" (featuring Chris Brown)	Wallace; Aaron Rodgers; Rashad Johnson; Christopher Brown	The Breed	2:57
5.	"Connect"	Wallace; Holmes	London on da Track	2:38
6.	"Don't Even Trip" (featuring Moneybagg Yo)	Wallace; Darrell Jackson; Demario White, Jr.	Chopsquad DJ	4:16
7.	"Fuck It Off" (featuring Chris Brown)	Wallace; McCurtis; Brown	Helluva	2:27
8.	"Colors"	Wallace; McCurtis	Helluva	2:56
9.	"Bag"	Wallace; Jackson	Chopsquad DJ	3:09
10.	"Time" (featuring Jeezy)	Wallace; Jackson; Jay Jenkins	Chopsquad DJ	3:40
11.	"Too Lit"	Wallace; McCurtis	Helluva	3:15
12.	"Light" (featuring Lil Yachty)	Wallace; Jackson; McCollum	Chopsquad DJ	4:36
13.	"Low"	Wallace; Jackson	Chopsquad DJ	2:52
14.	"Robbin"	Wallace; Brian Wicker; Jesse James; David Stokes	The Olympicks	3:37
15.	"Bloodas 2 Interlude" (featuring Lil Durk)	Wallace; Jackson; Durk Banks	Chopsquad DJ	3:25
16.	"Keys to the Street"	Wallace; Terrell Johnson	Infamous Rell	3:19
17.	"I Remember" (featuring YFN Lucci)	Wallace; Jackson; Rayshawn Bennett	Chopsquad DJ	4:37
18.	"On My Own"	Wallace; Jackson	Chopsquad DJ	3:52
Total length:				60:54

== Charts ==
Chart (2018)	Peak position
Canadian Albums (Billboard)	25
US Billboard 200	10
