= My Moment (album) =

Mixtape by Tee Grizzley
- Released: April 7, 2017
- Recorded: 2016–17
- Genre: Hip-hop
- Length: 42:52
- Label: 300
- Producer: DJ Mustard; Helluva; Sonny Digital; Westside Webb

Tee Grizzley chronology
My Moment (2017)	Bloodas (2017)

Singles from My Moment
- 1. "First Day Out" Released: January 6, 2017; 2. "No Effort" Released: March 31, 2017

My Moment is the debut commercial mixtape by American rapper Tee Grizzley. It was released on April 7, 2017, by 300 Entertainment. The production on the mixtape was handled by DJ Mustard, Helluva, Sonny Digital and Westside Webb.

== Track listing ==
Credits adapted from BMI.

No.	Title	Writer(s)	Producer(s)	Length
1.	"My Moment (Intro)"	Terry Wallace; Martin McCurtis	Helluva	3:18
2.	"First Day Out"	Wallace; McCurtis	Helluva	4:14
3.	"Real Niggas"	Sanchez; McCurtis	Helluva	3:42
4.	"Country"	Sanchez; Dijon McFarlane	DJ Mustard	2:53
5.	"No Effort"	Sanchez; McCurtis	Helluva	3:13
6.	"How Many"	Sanchez; McCurtis	Helluva	2:50
7.	"Overlapped"	Sanchez; Sonny Uwaezuoke	Sonny Digital	3:27
8.	"Side Nigga"	Wallace; McCurtis	Helluva	2:48
9.	"Secrets"	Wallace; McCurtis	Helluva	3:20
10.	"10K"	Wallace; McCurtis	Helluva	3:16
11.	"Catch It"	Wallace; Uwaezuoke; Branden Webb	Sonny Digital; Westside Webb	2:51
12.	"Day Ones"	Wallace; McCurtis	Helluva	4:11
13.	"Testimony (Outro)"	Wallace; McCurtis	Helluva	2:57
Total length:				42:52

== Charts ==
=== Weekly charts ===
Chart (2017)	Peak position
US Billboard 200	44
US Top R&B/Hip-Hop Albums (Billboard)	21

=== Year-end charts ===
Chart (2017)	Position
US Billboard 200	163
US Top R&B/Hip-Hop Albums (Billboard)	68

== Certifications ==
Region	Certification	Certified units/sales
United States (RIAA)	Gold	500,000^{‡}
^{‡} Sales+streaming figures based on certification alone.
