= Built for Whatever =

Studio album by Tee Grizzley
- Released: May 7, 2021
- Length: 53:48
- Label: Atlantic; 300
- Producer: Selim Bouab (also exec.); Antt Beatz; B. Lewis; Brian313; Chopsquad DJ; Da Realest; Helluva; Hit-Boy; Jose the Plug; Wavy Kid on the Beat

Tee Grizzley chronology
The Smartest (2020)	Built for Whatever (2021)	Half Tee Half Beast (2022)

Singles from Built for Whatever
- 1. "Late Night Calls" Released: February 5, 2021; 2. "White Lows Off Designer" Released: March 19, 2021; 3. "Never Bend Never Fold" Released: April 16, 2021

Built for Whatever is the third studio album by American rapper Tee Grizzley. It was released through Atlantic Records and 300 Entertainment on May 7, 2021. The album features guest appearances from the late King Von, Quavo, Young Dolph, YNW Melly, Lil Durk, Lil Tjay, Grizzley's younger brother Baby Grizzley, G Herbo, Allstar Lee, Mu, and Big Sean. Production was handled by Chopsquad DJ, Hit-Boy, and Helluva.

Professional ratings
Review scores
Source	Rating
Allmusic	3.5/5 stars

== Background ==
Tee Grizzley stated that "the title of this album is my whole life in one sentence", further explaining that "the songs on the album and the things I refer to lyrically on each track reflect pieces of my real life. The name of this album is exactly what I am – built for whatever". The font of the songs written in the track listing of the album is also the same font that is used in the series of action-adventure game Grand Theft Auto, which Grizzley is an avid fan of, as he created a Grand Theft Auto "Grizzley World" server that he played fans snippets of songs from the album a few days before it was released and also made a gaming team called Grizzley Gang Gaming.

== Singles ==
Tee Grizzley released the album's lead single, "Late Night Calls", on February 5, 2021. He followed it up with "White Lows Off Designer", featuring fellow American rapper Lil Durk, which was released as the second single on March 19, 2021. The third and final single, "Never Bend Never Fold", a collaboration with fellow American rapper G Herbo, was released on April 16, 2021.

== Release and promotion ==
On April 29, 2021, Tee Grizzley announced the album alongside its release date and artwork through social media. The track listing was revealed on May 3, 2021.

== Critical reception ==
DJ First Class from Revolt described the album as "a solid body of work that will indeed silence all haters and doubters" and "the title holds weight as Tee Grizzley lets it be known that he will beat any odds formed against him and continue to cement his legacy and provide for his family.

== Track listing ==
Built for Whatever track listing
No.	Title	Writer(s)	Producer(s)	Length
1.	"Grizzley Talk"	Terry Wallace, Jr.; Von Jose	Jose the Plug	3:29
2.	"Not Gone Play" (featuring King Von)	T. Wallace; Dayvon Bennett; Darrell Jackson	Chopsquad DJ	2:35
3.	"Built to Last"	T. Wallace; Jose	Jose the Plug	3:06
4.	"In My Feelings" (featuring Quavo and Young Dolph)	T. Wallace; Quavious Marshall; Adolph Thornton; Chauncey Hollis, Jr.	Hit-Boy	2:52
5.	"Careless" (featuring YNW Melly)	T. Wallace; Jamell Demons; Wavy Kid on the Beat	Wavy Kid on the Beat	2:58
6.	"White Lows Off Designer" (featuring Lil Durk)	T. Wallace; Durk Banks; Bradford Lewis	B. Lewis	2:55
7.	"Mad at Us"	T. Wallace; Jackson	Chopsquad DJ	2:37
8.	"Life Insurance" (featuring Lil Tjay)	T. Wallace; Tione Merritt; Jackson	Chopsquad DJ	3:53
9.	"Evictions"	T. Wallace; Hollis	Hit-Boy	2:35
10.	"Left Wrist Icey" (featuring Baby Grizzley)	T. Wallace; Marcellus Wallace; Martin McCurtis	Helluva	3:26
11.	"High Speed"	T. Wallace; Jackson	Chopsquad DJ	2:50
12.	"Never Bend Never Fold" (with G Herbo)	T. Wallace; Herbert Wright III; Jackson	Chopsquad DJ	2:30
13.	"Less Talking More Action"	T. Wallace; Antt Beatz	Antt Beatz	1:49
14.	"White Dior Tee" (featuring Allstar Lee and Mu)	T. Wallace; Leon Miles; Mu; Brian313	Brian313	2:51
15.	"What We On" (featuring Big Sean)	T. Wallace; Sean Anderson; Hollis	Hit-Boy	3:29
16.	"Quit Trappin"	T. Wallace; McCurtis	Helluva	2:00
17.	"Change"	T. Wallace; Jackson	Chopsquad DJ	2:52
18.	"Late Night Calls"	T. Wallace; Jackson	Chopsquad DJ	2:54
19.	"Free Baby Grizzley (Outro)" (featuring Baby Grizzley)	M. Wallace; Ronald Brown	Da Realest	2:07
Total length:				53:48

== Personnel ==
=== Musicians ===
- Tee Grizzley – primary artist (all tracks)
- King Von – featured artist (track 2)
- Quavo – featured artist (track 4)
- Young Dolph – featured artist (track 4)
- YNW Melly – featured artist (track 5)
- Lil Durk – featured artist (track 6)
- Lil Tjay – featured artist (track 8)
- Baby Grizzley – featured artist (tracks 10, 19)
- G Herbo – primary artist (track 12)
- Allstar Lee – featured artist (track 14)
- Mu – featured artist (track 14)
- Big Sean – featured artist (track 15)

=== Technical ===
- J Lacy – mixing (tracks 1–3, 5–8, 10–14, 16–19)
- David Kim – mixing (tracks 4, 9, 15)

== Charts ==
Chart performance for Built for Whatever
Chart (2021)	Peak position
Canadian Albums (Billboard)	46
US Billboard 200	15
US Top R&B/Hip-Hop Albums (Billboard)	10
