= Hip Hopper (song) =

Single by Blac Youngsta featuring Lil Yachty

from the album Illuminati and 223
- Released: February 7, 2017
- Genre: Hip hop; trap
- Length: 3:13
- Label: Heavy Camp; Collective; Epic
- Songwriters: Sammie Benson; Miles McCollum; Michael Williams II
- Producer: Mike Will Made It

Blac Youngsta singles chronology
"Beat It" (2016)	"Hip Hopper" (2017)	"Birthday" (2017)

Lil Yachty singles chronology
"From the D to the A" (2017)	"Hip Hopper" (2017)	"Marmalade" (2017)

Music video
- "Hip Hopper" on YouTube

"Hip Hopper" is a song by American rapper Blac Youngsta featuring fellow American rapper Lil Yachty. It was released on February 7, 2017, as the lead single from Blac's mixtape Illuminati. It was later included on his debut studio album 223.

== Music video ==
The music video for the track was released on June 7, 2017. It features Blac Youngsta and Lil Yachty at a retirement home.

== Critical reception ==
A writer for HotNewHipHop said the track had "a ridiculously infectious vibe", and that it was "partially due to the light and fun production provided by Mike Will Made It".

== Charts ==
Chart (2017)	Peak position
US Bubbling Under Hot 100 Singles (Billboard)	23

== Certifications ==
Region	Certification	Certified units/sales
United States (RIAA)	Gold	500,000^{‡}
^{‡} Sales+streaming figures based on certification alone.
