= Back End (song) =

2022 single by Finesse2tymes

Single by Finesse2tymes

from the album 90 Days
- Released: July 22, 2022
- Length: 2:45
- Label: Mob Ties; Bread Gang; Atlantic
- Songwriters: Ricky Hampton; Xabian Woods; Avery Halliburton
- Producers: DJ X.O.; Avo

Finesse2tymes singles chronology
"2 Gunz Vito" (2022)	"Back End" (2022)	"Black Visa" (2022)

Music video
- "Back End" on YouTube

"Back End" is a song by American rapper Finesse2tymes, released on July 22, 2022, as the lead single from his mixtape 90 Days (2022). Produced by DJ X.O. and Avo, it is one of the songs that propelled Finesse2tymes to fame and his first song to chart on the Billboard Hot 100, debuting at number 98 and peaking at number 86.

== Background ==
"Back End" was among the first songs that Finesse2tymes released following his release from prison. It became a viral hit on the video-sharing platform TikTok in the late summer of 2022, with creators using the song in videos which address double standards and inequality and directing attention to the lyrics "It's cool when they do it (It's cool, huh?) / it's a problem when I do it, fuck 'em". In January 2023, Finesse2tymes told Uproxx, "I knew this song was gonna be what it was gonna be when a number-one sensation on TikTok reposted it. It felt like success. I knew I was going to the top and it felt like I accomplished what I set out to accomplish in 90 days."

== Live performances ==
On December 15, 2022, Finesse2tymes performed the song on Uproxx Sessions.

== Charts ==
=== Weekly charts ===
Weekly chart performance for "Back End"
Chart (2022–2023)	Peak position
US Billboard Hot 100	86
US Hot R&B/Hip-Hop Songs	29

=== Year-end charts ===
Year-end chart performance for "Back End"
Chart (2023)	Position
US Hot R&B/Hip-Hop Songs (Billboard)	80
US Rhythmic (Billboard)	45

== Certifications ==
Certifications for "Back End"
Region	Certification	Certified units/sales
United States (RIAA)	Gold	500,000^{‡}
^{‡} Sales+streaming figures based on certification alone.
