= Still My Moment =

Mixtape by Tee Grizzley
- Released: November 9, 2018
- Genre: Hip-hop; trap
- Length: 40:31
- Label: 300
- Producer: Ant Beatz; Cubeatz; Helluva; J Gramm; Richie Souf; Tay Keith; Taz Taylor; The Two Fifteens; William Van Zandt

Tee Grizzley chronology
Activated (2018)	Still My Moment (2018)	Scriptures (2019)

Still My Moment is the second commercial mixtape by American rapper Tee Grizzley. It was released on November 9, 2018, by 300 Entertainment. The mixtape features guest appearances from Quavo, Offset, Chance the Rapper, and Lil Pump. It debuted at number 29 on the Billboard 200.

Professional ratings
Review scores
Source	Rating
Allmusic	4/5 stars

== Critical reception ==
The album received positive reviews from HotNewHipHop and HipHopDX.

== Track listing ==
No.	Title	Writer(s)	Producer(s)	Length
1.	"Still My Moment"	Terry Wallace; Martin McCurtis; Jobina Satish Brown	Helluva	1:44
2.	"Hooters"	Wallace; Brytavious Chambers	Tay Keith	2:50
3.	"1 Night" (featuring Quavo)	Wallace; Quavious Marshall; Tony Son	Richie Souf	3:11
4.	"Wake Up" (featuring Chance the Rapper)	Wallace; Chancelor Bennett; Juilan Gramma; Danny Snodgrass Jr.; Carter Lang; Jeff Gitelman; Nikki Jean; Peter Wilkins	J Gramm; Taz Taylor	3:06
5.	"We Dreamin"	Wallace; Anthony Britten II; Brown	Ant Beatz	2:34
6.	"Mr. Grizzley"	Wallace; Abraham Adams Jr.; Andrew Mandela Adams; Brown	The Two Fifteens	1:56
7.	"Pray for the Drip" (featuring Offset)	Wallace; Kiari Cephus; McCurtis; Brown	Helluva	2:50
8.	"Straight Up"	Wallace; McCurtis; Brown	Helluva	2:11
9.	"Bitches on Bitches" (featuring Lil Pump)	Wallace; Gazzy Garcia; Gramma; Kevin Gomringer; Tim Gomringer	J Gramm; Cubeatz	3:12
10.	"Hustlin" (featuring Bryan Hamilton)	Wallace; Bryan Hamilton; McCurtis; Brown	Helluva	3:14
11.	"Lost and Found" (featuring YNW Melly)	Wallace; Jamell Demons; William Van Zandt	William Van Zandt	2:40
12.	"I Want Em All"	Wallace; McCurtis; Brown	Helluva	2:18
13.	"Get Right"	Wallace; McCurtis; Britten II; Brown	Helluva; Ant Beatz	2:48
14.	"Keep the Rest"	Wallace; McCurtis; Brown	Helluva	2:55
15.	"Babies to Men"	Wallace; McCurtis; Britten II; Brown	Helluva; Ant Beatz	3:02
Total length:				40:31

== Charts ==
Chart (2018)	Peak position
US Billboard 200	29
US Top R&B/Hip-Hop Albums (Billboard)	16
