= Booty (Blac Youngsta song) =

2017 single by Blac Youngsta

Single by Blac Youngsta

from the album I'm Innocent and 223
- Released: September 6, 2017
- Genre: Hip hop; trap
- Length: 2:43
- Label: Heavy Camp; Collective; Epic
- Songwriters: Sammie Benson; Milan Modi; Marcus Marsh
- Producers: Yung Lan; Beatmonster Marc

Blac Youngsta singles chronology
| "Birthday" (2017) | "Booty" (2017) | "Cut Up" (2019) |

Music video
- "Booty" on YouTube

"Booty" is a song by American rapper Blac Youngsta. It was released on June 9, 2017, as the lead single from his mixtape I'm Innocent and his debut studio album 223. The track peaked at number 73 on the Billboard Hot 100.

== Background ==
The single was originally featured on Blac Youngsta's June 2017 mixtape I'm Innocent. It was later featured on his debut studio album 223 in February 2018.

== Music video ==
The music video for the track was released on February 6, 2018, and features a miniature version of himself in a strip club.

== Remix ==
The remix was released on February 27, 2018 featuring Chris Brown, Trey Songz, and Jeezy.

== Commercial performance ==
The track debuted at number 81 on the Billboard Hot 100, marking Blac Youngsta's Hot 100 debut. It later rose to number 73.

== Charts ==
| Chart (2018) | Peak position |
|---|---|
| US Billboard Hot 100 | 73 |

== Certifications ==
| Region | Certification | Certified units/sales |
|---|---|---|
| United States (RIAA) | Gold | 500,000^{‡} |
^{‡} Sales+streaming figures based on certification alone.
