= IDGAF (Tee Grizzley song) =

Single by Tee Grizzley featuring Chris Brown and Mariah the Scientist

from the album Tee's Coney Island
- Released: September 8, 2023
- Genre: R&B; hip hop
- Length: 3:15
- Label: Grizzley Gang; 300
- Songwriters: Terry Wallace Jr.; Chris Brown; Mariah Amani Buckles
- Producer: Chopsquad DJ

Tee Grizzley singles chronology
"Gorgeous" (2023)	"IDGAF" (2023)	"Grizzley 2Tymes" (2023)

Chris Brown singles chronology
"How We Roll" (2023)	"IDGAF" (2023)	"Sensational" (2023)

Mariah the Scientist singles chronology
"Rear View" (2023)	"IDGAF" (2023)	"From a Woman" (2023)

Music video
- "IDGAF" on YouTube

"IDGAF" (also known as "You Gon Give it Up" in the edited version) is a song by American rapper Tee Grizzley featuring American singers Chris Brown and Mariah the Scientist. It was released on September 8, 2023, through Grizzley Gang and 300, as the lead single from Grizzley's fourth album Tee's Coney Island.

== Music video ==
The official music video was released on August 4, 2023. It was directed by Blu and MikeyRare.

== Commercial performance ==
On January 16, 2024, "IDGAF" debuted at number 100 on the US Billboard Hot 100, serving as Mariah the Scientist's first entry on the chart, Grizzley's second, and Brown's 116th.It soon peaked at number 98.

== Track listings ==
Single

1. "IDGAF" (featuring Chris Brown and Mariah the Scientist) – 3:15

Sped Up & Slowed Down versions

1. "IDGAF" (featuring Chris Brown and Mariah the Scientist; sped up) – 2:28
2. "IDGAF" (featuring Chris Brown and Mariah the Scientist; slowed down) – 3:31

Clean version

1. "IDGAF" (featuring Chris Brown and Mariah the Scientist) – 3:15

== Charts ==
=== Weekly charts ===
Chart performance for "IDGAF"
Chart (2023–2024)	Peak position
New Zealand Hot Singles (RMNZ)	9
US Billboard Hot 100	98
US Radio Songs (Billboard)	41
US Hot R&B/Hip-Hop Songs (Billboard)	30
US R&B/Hip-Hop Airplay (Billboard)	7
US Rhythmic Airplay (Billboard)	19

=== Year-end charts ===
2024 year-end chart performance for "IDGAF"
Chart (2024)	Position
US Hot R&B/Hip-Hop Songs (Billboard)	80
US R&B/Hip-Hop Airplay (Billboard)	14

== Certifications ==
Certifications from "IDGAF"
Region	Certification	Certified units/sales
New Zealand (RMNZ)	Gold	15,000^{‡}
United States (RIAA)	Gold	500,000^{‡}
^{‡} Sales+streaming figures based on certification alone.
