= Tee Grizzley =

American rapper (born 1994)

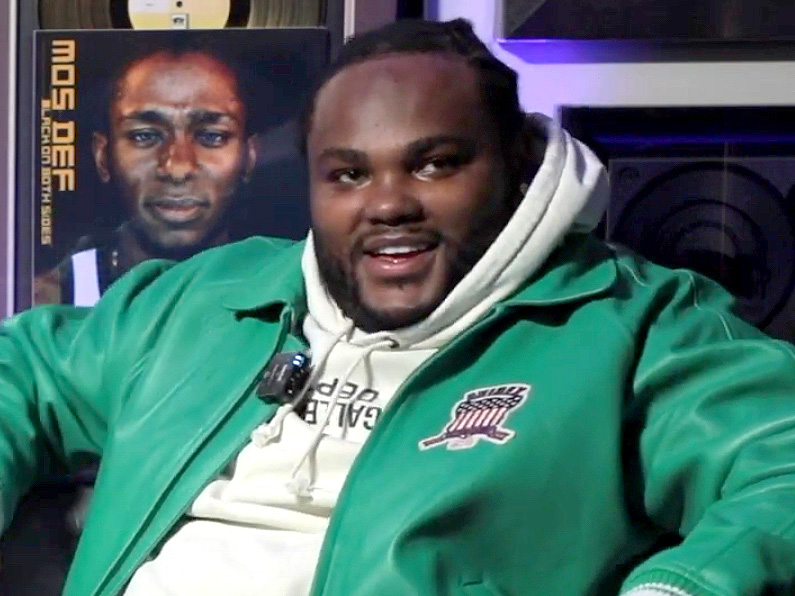
- Tee Grizzley in 2024

Background information
- Born: Terry Sanchez Wallace Jr. March 23, 1994 (age 32); Detroit, Michigan, U.S.
- Genres: Michigan rap; trap
- Occupations: Rapper; songwriter
- Years active: 2011–present
- Labels: Grizzley Gang; 300
- Producer(s): Helluva
- Children: 2

Terry Sanchez Wallace Jr. (born March 23, 1994), known professionally as Tee Grizzley, is an American rapper. He first began posting music online following a two year prison sentence, self-releasing his 2017 song "First Day Out". It quickly gained viral status—earning two million views on YouTube in under three weeks—due to a social media challenge enacted by American basketball player LeBron James, after which the song peaked within the top 50 of the Billboard Hot 100 and led him to sign with 300 Entertainment. Its release preceded his debut mixtape My Moment (2017), and was followed by the single "From the D to the A" (featuring Lil Yachty), which received double platinum certification by the Recording Industry Association of America (RIAA). His collaborative mixtape with Lil Durk, Bloodas (2018), was followed by his debut studio album, Activated (2018).

The album peaked at number ten on the Billboard 200, while his second and third albums, the Timbaland-produced Scriptures (2019) and Built for Whatever (2021), peaked at numbers 20 and 15, respectively. His fourth album, Tee's Coney Island (2023) marked a period of commercial resurgence as its lead single, "IDGAF" (featuring Chris Brown and Mariah the Scientist) entered the Billboard Hot 100 once more.

== Early life ==
Wallace was born on March 23, 1994, in Detroit, Michigan, and was raised by his grandmother near the intersection of Joy Rd. & Southfield Freeway in the Warrendale neighborhood due to his mother and father constantly being in and out of prison. In middle school he began developing an interest in rap music and eventually formed the musical group All Stars Ball Hard (ASBH) along with three of his friends, JR, Po, and Lee. Wallace took the moniker of ASBH Tee, and they began uploading their songs to YouTube. In 2011, his mother was sentenced to 20 years in prison for drug trafficking and released in late 2020. His father was murdered in 2012.

Wallace was the first member of his family to attend college in generations. He attended Michigan State University to study finance and accounting. He and a friend began to burglarize other students' dormitories. They stole $20,000 worth of electronics and money from other students in February 2014. On February 27, Wallace and Jeremy Ford were caught but released pending investigation.

Wallace went on the run, and fled to Kentucky. On July 1, 2014, Wallace was one of three people arrested following an attempted robbery at a jewelry store in Lexington, Kentucky. Wallace was sentenced to nine months for the robbery, and, while already serving that sentence, he was sentenced to 18 months to 15 years for the Michigan State robberies in September 2015. On October 16, 2016, he was released from prison in Michigan.

== Career ==
=== 2016–2019: Debut singles, My Moment, Activated, and collaborations ===
While in prison, Wallace began to take rapping more seriously and wrote the entirety of his debut mixtape. After being released from prison, where he took the name Tee Grizzley, he released his debut single "First Day Out" in November 2016. The music video, posted to YouTube, gained over 2 million views in less than three weeks. He later signed to 300 Entertainment and Atlantic Records in 2017. He released his second single, "Second Day Out", in February 2017. His third single "From the D to the A" featuring Lil Yachty was released in March 2017.

He released "No Effort" and its accompanying music video on March 31, 2017. His debut mixtape My Moment was released on April 7, 2017. Grizzley said that his record sales tripled after his song was featured in a LeBron James Instagram post. Grizzley's song "Teetroit" was released on July 28, 2017. The single "Beef", featuring Meek Mill, was released on September 1, 2017. He received two 2017 BET Hip Hop Award nominations for Best New Hip-Hop Artist and Best Mixtape for My Moment.

He released the song "Win" on October 6, 2017. He released the song "What Yo City Like" with rapper Lil Durk on November 30, 2017, as the lead single for their joint mixtape, Bloodas, released on December 8 of that year. He released the single "Colors" on February 2, 2018. The single "Don't Even Trip" featuring Moneybagg Yo was released on March 14, 2018.

On March 9, 2018, Grizzley appeared on Lil Yachty's album Lil Boat 2 on the track "Get Money Bros.". His debut studio album, Activated, was released on May 11, 2018. In August, he received a 2018 MTV Video Music Award nomination for Push Artist of the Year. He released the mixtape Still My Moment on November 9, 2018. In May 2019, he released the single "Locked Up".

On August 20, 2019, his vehicle was shot at in Detroit, Michigan. His aunt and then-manager Jobina Brown was killed in the shooting; she was 41. He and the driver survived the incident unharmed. On September 20, 2019, Grizzley released his single "Satish" accompanied with a music video to commemorate Brown's death.

=== 2020–present: The Smartest, Built for Whatever and Half Tee Half Beast ===
In January 2020, Tee Grizzley released the single "Red Light". In March, he released the single "Payroll" featuring Payroll Giovanni. His song "No Talkin" was featured in the Netflix film Coffee & Kareem. He released the song "I Spy" on May 1, and "Mr. Officer" on June 5 in response to the murder of George Floyd and police brutality. The song features Queen Naija and members of the Detroit Youth Choir. He released the mixtape The Smartest on June 19.

On May 7, 2021, Tee Grizzley released his third studio album, Built for Whatever, a 19-track record that includes guest appearances from artists such as the late King Von and Young Dolph, as well as Lil Durk, YNW Melly, Quavo, G Herbo, and Big Sean.

On April 15, 2022, Tee Grizzley released the mixtape Half Tee Half Beast, along with a video for the track "Robbery Part 3". He explained the mixtape's title: "Yeah, I"m human like everyone else, but also the things I've been through and had to survive made me a beast".

On October 4, 2024, Tee Grizzley released his fifth studio album Post Traumatic. It was preceded by the singles "Suffer in Silence", "Swear to God", "Robbery 7", "Detroit", "Blow for Blow" and "Situationship", which were all released in 2024.

On May 16, 2025, Tee Grizzley released his sixth studio album Forever My Moment. It was preceded by the singles "Rick Jameski", "Jalen Hurtski", "Forever My Moment", "My God" and "They Shot at Trump" which details how Grizzley gained a new sense of existential dread at seeing the attempted assassination of President Donald Trump.

On May 1, 2026, Tee Grizzley released the single "Still Going".

== Personal life ==
In February 2021, My'Eisha Agnew gave birth to Wallace's first child, a son named Terry Wallace III. Grizzley married My’Eisha Agnew June 4, 2023.

Grizzley is an avid gamer and began streaming in 2020 to fans on the video streaming platform Twitch. The vast majority of his streams are centered around Grand Theft Auto V.

== Discography ==
=== Studio albums ===
List of studio albums, with selected chart positions
Title	Details	Peak chart positions				Certifications
Title	Details	US	US R&B/ HH	US Rap	CAN	Certifications
Activated	Released: May 11, 2018; Label: Grizzley Gang, 300; Format: CD, digital download, streaming	10	6	6	25	RIAA: Gold
Scriptures	Released: June 7, 2019; Label: Grizzley Gang, 300; Format: Digital download, streaming	20	10	9	43	
Built for Whatever	Released: May 7, 2021; Label: Grizzley Gang, 300; Format: Digital download, streaming	15	10	9	46	
Tee's Coney Island	Released: November 3, 2023; Label: Grizzley Gang, 300; Format: Digital download, streaming	65	24	20	—	
Post Traumatic	Released: October 4, 2024; Label: Grizzley Gang, 300; Format: Digital download, streaming	60	20	15	—	
"—" denotes a recording that did not chart or was not released in that territory.

=== Mixtapes ===
List of mixtapes, with selected chart positions
Title	Details	Peak chart positions				Certifications
Title	Details	US	US R&B/ HH	US Rap	CAN	Certifications
My Moment	Released: April 7, 2017; Labels: Grizzley Gang, 300; Format: Digital download, streaming	44	21	16	—	RIAA: Gold
Still My Moment	Released: November 9, 2018; Label: Grizzley Gang, 300; Format: Digital download, streaming	29	16	15	57	
The Smartest	Released: June 19, 2020; Label: Grizzley Gang, 300; Format: Digital download, streaming, CD, LP	22	14	11	88	
Half Tee Half Beast	Released: April 15, 2022; Label: Grizzley Gang, 300; Format: Digital download, streaming, CD	116	—	—	—	
Chapters of the Trenches	Released: October 14, 2022; Label: Grizzley Gang, 300; Format: Digital download, streaming	124	—	—	—	
Forever My Moment	Released: May 16, 2025; Label: 300; Format: Digital download, streaming	—	—	—	—	
Street Psalms	Released: November 14, 2025; Label: 300; Format: Digital download, streaming	—	—	—	—	
"—" denotes a recording that did not chart or was not released in that territory.

=== Collaborative mixtapes ===
List of collaborative mixtapes, with selected chart positions
Title	Details	Peak chart positions		
Title	Details	US	US R&B/ HH	US Rap
Bloodas (with Lil Durk)	Released: December 8, 2017; Label: Tee Grizzley, 300, Def Jam, OTF; Format: Digital download, streaming	96	34	25
Controversy (with Skilla Baby)	Released: April 28, 2023; Label: Grizzley Gang, 300; Format: Digital download, streaming	—	—	—
"—" denotes a recording that did not chart or was not released in that territory.

=== Singles ===
==== As lead artist ====
List of singles as lead artist, with showing year released and album name
Title	Year	Peak chart positions			Certifications	Album
Title	Year	US	US R&B/HH	US Rap	Certifications	Album
"First Day Out" (solo or with Meek Mill)	2016	48	18	13	RIAA: 6× Platinum	My Moment
"Straight to It" (featuring Band Gang)	2017	—	—	—		Non-album singles
"Second Day Out"	2017	—	—	—		Non-album singles
"From the D to the A" (featuring Lil Yachty)	2017	— (Note: "From the D to the A" did not enter the Billboard Hot 100, but peaked at number three on the Bubbling Under Hot 100 Singles chart.)	48	—	RIAA: 5× Platinum	Non-album singles
"No Effort"	2017	—	— (Note: "No Effort" did not enter the Billboard Hot R&B/Hip-Hop Songs chart, but peaked at number four on the Bubbling Under R&B/Hip-Hop Singles chart.)	—	RIAA: Platinum	My Moment
"Beef" (featuring Meek Mill)	2017	—	— (Note: "Beef" did not enter the Billboard Hot R&B/Hip-Hop Songs chart, but peaked at number seven on the Bubbling Under R&B/Hip-Hop Singles chart.)	—		Non-album single
"Colors"	2018	— (Note: "Colors" did not enter the Billboard Hot 100, but peaked at number 22 on the Bubbling Under Hot 100 Singles chart.)	— (Note: "Colors" did not enter the Billboard Hot R&B/Hip-Hop Songs chart, but peaked at number six on the Bubbling Under R&B/Hip-Hop Singles chart.)	—		Activated
"Don't Even Trip" (featuring Moneybagg Yo)	2018	—	—	—		Activated
"Sweet Thangs"	2019	—	—	—		Scriptures
"Satish"	2019	— (Note: "Satish" did not enter the Billboard Hot 100, but peaked at number two on the Bubbling Under Hot 100 Singles chart.)	48	—	RIAA: Gold	The Smartest
"Red Light"	2020	—	—	—		Non-album singles
"Payroll"	2020	—	—	—		Non-album singles
"I Spy"	2020	—	—	—		Non-album singles
"Mr. Officer" (featuring Queen Naija and Members of the Detroit Youth Choir)	2020	—	—	—		The Smartest
"Married to My Enemies" (with Jackboy)	2020	—	—	—		Living in History
"Wit a Sticc" (with Stupid Young)	2020	—	—	—		From Here on Out
"For the Team" (with Blaze)	2020	—	—	—		Non-album singles
"Bossa Nova" (with Kash Doll)	2020	—	—	—		Non-album singles
"Gave That Back" (featuring Baby Grizzley)	2021	—	—	—		Non-album singles
"Late Night Calls"	2021	—	—	—		Built for Whatever
"Robbery Part Two"	2021	—	—	—		Non-album single
"White Lows Off Designer" (featuring Lil Durk)	2021	—	—	—		Built for Whatever
"Never Bend Never Fold" (with G Herbo)	2021	—	—	—		Built for Whatever
"313-414" (with Lakeyah featuring DJ Drama)	2021	—	—	—		My Time (Gangsta Grillz: Special Edition)
"Afterlife"	2022	—	—	—		Half Tee Half Beast
"Beat the Streets"	2022	—	—	—		Half Tee Half Beast
"Buss It All Down"	2022	—	—	—		Half Tee Half Beast
"Robbery"	2022	—	—	—		Non-album single
"Robbery Part 4"	2022	—	—	—		Chapters of the Trenches
"Jay & Twan 1"	2022	—	—	—		Chapters of the Trenches
"Ms. Evans 1"	2022	—	—	—		Chapters of the Trenches
"Tez & Tone 1"	2022	—	—	—		Chapters of the Trenches
"Jay & Twan 2"	2022	—	—	—		Chapters of the Trenches
"Dropped the Lo" (with Skilla Baby)	2023	—	—	—		Controversy
"B&E Pt. 1" (with Skilla Baby)	2023	—	—	—		Controversy
"Gorgeous" (with Skilla Baby or remix featuring City Girls)	2023	—	—	—		Controversy and Tee's Coney Island
"IDGAF" (featuring Chris Brown and Mariah the Scientist)	2023	98	30	22	RIAA: Gold	Tee's Coney Island
"Grizzley 2Tymes" (featuring Finesse2tymes)	2023	—	—	—		Tee's Coney Island
"Robbery 6"	2023	—	—	—		Tee's Coney Island
"Pressin'" (with Kash Doll)	2024	—	—	—		Non-album single
"Suffer in Silence"	2024	—	—	—		Post Traumatic
"Swear to God" (featuring Future)	2024	— (Note: "Swear to God" did not enter the Billboard Hot 100, but peaked at number 10 on the Bubbling Under Hot 100 Singles chart.)	40	—		Post Traumatic
"Robbery 7"	2024	—	—	—		Post Traumatic
"Detroit" (featuring 42 Dugg)	2024	—	—	—		Post Traumatic
"Blow for Blow" (featuring J. Cole)	2024	88	23	20		Post Traumatic
"Situationship" (with Mariah the Scientist)	2024	—	—	—		Post Traumatic
"Voicemail" (featuring Rod Wave)	2025	— (Note: "Voicemail" did not enter the Billboard Hot 100, but peaked at number 21 on the Bubbling Under Hot 100 chart.)	36	24		Street Psalms
"Seen Enough" (featuring Polo G)	2025	—	—	—		Street Psalms
"Hard Times" (featuring Hurricane Wisdom)	2026	—	—	—		Street Psalms
"Still Going"	2026	—	—	—		Non-album single
"—" denotes a recording that did not chart or was not released in that territory.

==== As featured artist ====
List of singles as featured artist, with showing year released
Title	Year	Certifications	Album
"Money" (Allstar Ballhard featuring Tee Grizzley)	2017		Non-album singles
"Road to Riches" (Ty featuring Tee Grizzley)	2017		Non-album singles
"Supposed To" (Duo Tycoon featuring Tee Grizzley)	2017		Non-album singles
"#Moneybag" (Gway featuring Tee Grizzley and YV)	2017		Non-album singles
"We Got It Lit" (Navé Monjo featuring Tee Grizzley)	2017		Non-album singles
"Rollie On" (Aoc Obama featuring Tee Grizzley)	2017		Obamacare 2
"Still Running" (Cap 4z and K'hunnit featuring Tee Grizzley)	2017		Non-album singles
"Get the Money" (Lougotcash featuring Tee Grizzley)	2017		Non-album singles
"Any Means Necessary" (Cash Kounty Pilot featuring Tee Grizzley)	2017		Non-album singles
"I'm On 3.0" (Trae tha Truth featuring T.I., Dave East, Tee Grizzley, Royce da 5'9", Curren$y, DRAM, Snoop Dogg, Fabolous, Rick Ross, Chamillionaire, G-Eazy, Styles P, E-40, Mark Morrison, and Gary Clark, Jr.)	2017		Tha Truth, Pt. 3
"Cold Summer" (Jeezy featuring Tee Grizzley)	2017		Pressure
"Dreadz n Bread (Remix)" (Nook and Tee Grizzley and Sada Baby)	2018		Non-album singles
"Freddy Krueger" (YNW Melly featuring Tee Grizzley)	2018	RIAA: Platinum	Non-album singles
"Freak" (Chris Brown featuring Lil Wayne, Joyner Lucas and Tee Grizzley)	2024		11:11 (Deluxe)
"—" denotes a recording that did not chart or was not released in that territory.

=== Other charted songs ===
Title	Year	Peak chart positions	Certifications	Album
Title	Year	US Bub.	Certifications	Album
"Jettski Grizzley" (featuring Lil Pump)	2018	4	RIAA: Gold	Activated
"2 Vaults" (featuring Lil Yachty)	2018	12	RIAA: Platinum	Activated
"Young Grizzley World" (featuring YNW Melly and A Boogie wit da Hoodie)	2019	—	RIAA: Platinum	Scriptures
"Friday Night Cypher" (Big Sean featuring Tee Grizzley, Kash Doll, Cash Kidd, Payroll, 42 Dugg, Boldy James, Drego, Sada Baby, Royce da 5'9", and Eminem)	2020	10		Detroit 2
"Rich Gangsta" (King Von featuring Tee Grizzley)	2022	18		What It Means to Be King
"Robbery Part 3"	2022	20		Half Tee Half Beast
"—" denotes a recording that did not chart or was not released in that territory.

=== Guest appearances ===
Title	Year	Artist(s)	Album
"Dope Money"	2016	Gtm Gwolla Gettaz	Been Trippin Lately (Vol. 1, Catch the Wave)
"Want Millions"	2016	Louie Ray, Bankroll Bubba	The Gift
"Mouth Closed"	2017	Bang Gang Paid Will, Bandgang Maseo	Br6nx Baby
"Bankroll Bigger"	2017	Gtm Gwolla Gettaz	Until My Time Came
"Kick Her out (Remix)"	2017	Gtm Gwolla Gettaz, Crispy Gotti, BandGang, Bossman Rich, AllStar Lee	Welcome 2 the Darkside, Vol. 1
"Rollie On"	2017	Aoc Obama	Obamacare 2
"#Moneybag"	2017	Gway, Yv	The G Way
"Catch Up"	2017	Reeves Junya	Remake World Underground Mainstream
"We the Ones"	2017	Quality Control Music, Takeoff	Control the Streets, Volume 1
"Cold Summer"	2017	Jeezy	Pressure
"Get The Money"	2017	LouGotCash	Lounited States of America Pt2
"GET MONEY BROS."	2018	Lil Yachty	Lil Boat 2
"Head Tap"	2018	Don Q	Don Talk
"D to the A Freestyle"	2018	MBNel	Deeper Than Rap
scope="row""Ready 4 Real"	2018	Lil Reese	GetBackGang
"My Shit"	2018	Philthy Rich	N.E.R.N.L. 4
"Where Im From"	2018	DatBoiSkeet	Broke Is The Root Of All Evil
"Shit Real"	2018	Jay Rock	Redemption
"Keys to the Streets"	2018	Cash Click Boog	Indictment Music
"Game"	2018	Only the Family, Lil Durk, Sada Baby, YNW Melly	Only the Family Involved, Vol. 2
"MWBL"	2019	42 Dugg	Young and Turnt
"All the Money - Remix"	2019	Tie Cinco	20Cinco
"Surf"	2019	King Combs, City Girls, AZ Chike	Cyncerely, C3
"Nobody Watching"	2019	Fredo Bang	Big Ape
"Bullshit"	2019	Ralo, Bankroll Ziggy, VI Deck	Free Ralo
"Go to Mars"	2019	PnB Rock	TrapStar Turnt PopStar
"Faith"	2019	Booka600	Word to LA
"Made This Way"	2019	E-40, Rod Wave	Practice Makes Paper
"Once Again"	2019	Quality Control Music, Lil Yachty	Control the Streets, Volume 2
"The Silk Road"	2019	Highly Suspect	MCID
"Still Running"	2019	DemGuyz, Cap 4z, K-Hunnit	For da Streetz 2
"Blessings"	2019	Jae Mansa	Relationships & Money
"Stainless Steel"	2020	DigDat	Ei8ht Mile
"Str8"	2020	King Von	Levon James
"Like A Gee"	2020	Fredo Bang	Most Hated
"Big Boy Money"	2020	Westside Tut	Don't Let Go 2
"Married to My Enemies"	2020	Jackboy	Living In History
"Notice Me"	2020	Jackboy	Living In History
"Friday Night Cypher"	2020	Big Sean, Kash Doll, Cash Kidd, Payroll Giovanni, 42 Dugg, Boldy James, Drego, Sada Baby, Royce da 5'9", Eminem	Detroit 2
"R.I.P"	2020	Berner	Russ Bufalino: The Quiet Don
"Energy"	2020	Drakeo the Ruler	We Know the Truth
"Wit A Sticc"	2020	$tupid Young	From Here On Out
"Forever"	2021	Peewee Longway, Cassius Jay, Lil Yachty	Longway Sinatra 2
"Check Wit It"	2021	Young Buck, Sada Baby	Back on My Buck Shit, Vol. 3
"Chess"	2021	Only the Family	Only The Family - Lil Durk Presents: Loyal Bros
"Game Face"	2021	Only the Family, Booka600	Only The Family - Lil Durk Presents: Loyal Bros
"NO HAND OUTS - REMIX"	2021	Donnie B	Detroit State of Mind
"Dynamic Duo"	2021	Lil Yachty	Michigan Boy Boat
"Pistolette"	2021	28AV, Blanco Warren	Czarleo
"Freddy Krueger"	2021	YNW Melly, Future	Just a Matter of Slime
"313-414"	2021	Lakeyah, DJ Drama	My Time (Gangsta Grillz: Special Edition)
"Turn Into 20"	2021	Payroll Giovanni, Peezy	Giovanni's Way
"Trendsetter - Radio Edit"	2022	Boujee Leak	Convergence
"Certified Street Platinum"	2022	AllStar Lee	STREET PLATINUM
"Rich Gangsta"	2022	King Von	What It Means to Be King
"Wit It"	2022	Drego & Beno, Sada Baby, Lil Yachty	Sorry We Was Trapping
"Pay For It"	2022	Fredo Bang, Soulja Slim	UNLV
"Uh Huh"	2023	Hunxho	22
"Spoof"	2023	Trapland Pat	Professor Trap
"Stepped On"	2023	HorseTheOne	The Hood Hope
"Hell Yeah"	2023	HorseTheOne, Booka600	The Hood Hope
"Heartless"	2023	King Von	Grandson
"DBZ"	2023	Flight	Walking W Pt. 2
"NO GPS 2"	2023	264 Quez	Always On Go
"Hell Yeah"	2023	OMB Peezy	Le'Paris
"Drac N' The Cape"	2024	THF LIL LAW	The Artof A HANNLER
"Freak"	2024	Chris Brown, Lil Wayne, Joyner Lucas	11:11 (Deluxe)
"Rose Gold"	2024	Baby Money	H.I.M (Hustle In Me)
"G-Code"	2024	Mike Smiff	Thinking Out Loud
"MALIBU"	2024	YG, G Herbo	JUST RE'D UP 3
"HOODBACHI"	2024	Doodie Lo	WHAT MADE ME
"Kill A Rapper"	2024	Tay B	YOU'RE WELCOME
"Pressin'"	2024	Kash Doll	The Last Doll
"Benefits"	2024	BlakeIANA	Back In The Field
"Cecil Fielder"	2024	Boldy James, Harry Fraud	The Bricktionary
"Controversy 2"	2024	Skilla Baby	Crack Music 3
"F 12"	2025	Luhh Dyl	Intrude
"Joy Road to Camp Wisdom"	2025	Montana 700	700 Reasons
"B.E.D"	2026	Tink	Fuck, Marry, Kill

== Awards and nominations ==
Year	Award	Category	Work	Result
2017	2017 BET Hip Hop Awards	Best New Hip Hop Artist	Himself	Nominated
2017	2017 BET Hip Hop Awards	Best Mixtape	My Moment	Nominated
2018	MTV Video Music Awards	Push Artist of the Year	Himself	Nominated
