= Half Tee Half Beast =

Mixtape by Tee Grizzley
- Released: April 15, 2022
- Genre: Hip hop
- Length: 44:47
- Label: Grizzley Gang; 300
- Producer: J. R. Rotem (exec.); Antt Beatz; Black Man Chant; Chopsquad DJ; D.A. Got That Dope; Helluva; Marlin Brandoe; Stefanccino

Tee Grizzley chronology
Built For Whatever (2021)	Half Tee Half Beast (2022)	Chapters Of The Trenches (2022)

Singles from Half Tee Half Beast
- 1. "Afterlife" Released: January 28, 2022; 2. "Beat The Streets" Released: March 3, 2022; 3. "Buss It All Down" Released: March 31, 2022

Half Tee Half Beast is the fourth commercial mixtape by American rapper Tee Grizzley. It was released on April 15, 2022, by Grizzley Gang and 300 Entertainment. The mixtape features guest appearances from Lakeyah and Baby Grizzley. The mixtape was mainly produced by J. R. Rotem, alongside other producers including Chopsquad DJ, D.A. Got That Dope, and Helluva, among others. The mixtape was supported by three singles: "Afterlife", "Beat The Streets" and "Buss It All Down". The mixtape received mixed critical reviews and charted at number 116 on the US Billboard 200 chart, dated April 30, 2022.

== Background and promotion ==
Tee Grizzley described the meaning of the mixtape title by stating:

The name of the mixtape draws a line between the different sides of me. Yeah, I'm human like everyone else but also the things I've been through and had to survive made me a beast.

— Tee Grizzley

=== Singles ===
The mixtape's first single, "Afterlife", was released on January 28, 2022, along with an accompanying music video.

The mixtape's second single, "Beat The Streets", was released on March 3, 2022. The music for the song was premiered on March 4, after the single was released.

The mixtape's third and final single, "Buss It All Down", was released on March 31, 2022. The music video for the song was premiered on April 1, after the single was released.

== Critical reception ==
Professional ratings
Review scores
Source	Rating
AllMusic	3/5 stars
BensBeat	6/10

Half Tee Half Beast was met with generally mixed reviews from music critics. Paul Simpson of AllMusic, gave the mixtape 3 out of 5 stars, stating that the project "reflects his humanity as well as the struggles he's endured throughout his life, which have only made him stronger." Next, he says the "hard-as-nails bangers like the piercing "Loyalty" and "Hustlin" leave the biggest impression, but lighter, more introspective cuts like the eerie "Oh Yeah" and the empowering "Your Grave" demonstrate his sensitive side".

On BensBeat, the critic says "While his style can get a little stagnant after a while and there are a couple moments where it's clear Grizzley doesn't understand where his greatest strengths lie, it's hard not to nod your head to most of his flow. Not to mention – there's a blast from the past in J. R. Rotem doing most of the beats on this project". The critic gave the mixtape a 6 out of 10.

== Track listing ==
Credits adapted from Tidal.

No.	Title	Writer(s)	Producer(s)	Length
1.	"Half Tee Half Beast"	Terry Wallace; Darrell Jackson; Jonathan Rotem	Chopsquad DJ; J. R. Rotem	2:38
2.	"By Myself"	T. Wallace; Rotem	J. R. Rotem	2:29
3.	"Loyalty"	T. Wallace; Rotem	J. R. Rotem	2:36
4.	"Robbery Part 3"	T. Wallace; Rotem	J. R. Rotem	4:33
5.	"MilTroit" (featuring Lakeyah)	T. Wallace; Lakeyah Robinson; Rotem	J. R. Rotem	2:24
6.	"Afterlife"	T. Wallace; Rotem	J. R. Rotem	2:29
7.	"Buss It All Down"	T. Wallace; Rotem; Harold Faltermeyer; Andre Clarke	J. R. Rotem; Black Man Chant	2:21
8.	"Oh Yeah"	T. Wallace; David Doman; F. Thomas; Daniel Kostov; Christopher Torpey	D.A. Got That Dope	2:46
9.	"Built 4 It"	T. Wallace; Rotem; Tupac Shakur; Deon Evans; Bruce Hornsby	J. R. Rotem	2:24
10.	"Your Grave"	T. Wallace; Doman; Ruaidhri Mannion	D.A. Got That Dope	3:06
11.	"Drop A Bag"	T. Wallace; Martin McCurtis; Filip Dariusz	Helluva; Stefanccino	1:52
12.	"No Hook"	T. Wallace; Rotem	J. R. Rotem	2:37
13.	"I'm on Go"	T. Wallace; Doman; Pat Byrne; Torpey	D.A. Got That Dope	2:39
14.	"Hustlin"	T. Wallace; Anthony Britten II	Antt Beatz	2:17
15.	"Beat the Streets"	T. Wallace; Rotem	J. R. Rotem	2:35
16.	"G7"	T. Wallace; Rotem	J. R. Rotem	2:37
17.	"Whoop" (featuring Baby Grizzley)	T. Wallace; Marcellus Wallace; Marlin Brandoe	Brandoe	2:24
Total length:				44:47

=== Sample credits ===
- "Built 4 It" contains samples from "Changes" written by Tupac Shakur, Deon Evans and Bruce Hornsby, performed by 2Pac featuring Talent.

== Personnel ==
Credits were adapted from Tidal.

=== Vocalists ===
- Tee Grizzley – primary artist
- Lakeyah – featured artist (track 2)
- Baby Grizzley – featured artist (track 17)

=== Production ===
- J. R. Rotem – executive producer (tracks 1–7, 9, 12, 15–16)
- Chopsquad DJ – producer (track 1)
- Black Man Chant – producer (track 7)
- D.A. Got That Dope – producer (tracks 8, 10, 13)
- Helluva – producer (track 11)
- Stefanccino – producer (track 11)
- Antt Beatz – producer (track 14)
- Marlin Brandoe – producer (track 17)

=== Technical ===
- Selim Bouab – A&R direction (all tracks)
- Colin Leonard – masterer (all tracks)
- J. R. Rotem – mixer (track 1–5, 7, 9)
- Jaycen Joshua – mixer (track 6)
- Patrizio "Teezio" Pigliapoco – mixer (tracks 8, 10, 11, 13, 15–17)
- Antt Beats – mixer (track 14)
- Ignacio Portales – assistant mixing engineer (track 15)

== Charts ==
Chart performance for Half Tee Half Beast
Chart (2022)	Peak position
US Billboard 200	116
