= From the D to the A =

Single by Tee Grizzley featuring Lil Yachty
- Released: March 17, 2017
- Genre: Hip hop; trap
- Length: 2:38
- Label: 300
- Songwriter(s): Terry Wallace; Miles McCollum; Martin McCurtis
- Producer(s): Helluva Beats

Tee Grizzley singles chronology
"Second Day Out" (2017)	"From the D to the A" (2017)	"No Effort" (2017)

Lil Yachty singles chronology
"iSpy" (2016)	"From The D To The A" (2017)	"Hip Hopper" (2017)

Music video
- "From The D To The A" on YouTube

"From the D to the A" is a song by American rapper Tee Grizzley featuring fellow American rapper Lil Yachty, released as a single on March 17, 2017. It was produced by Helluva and called "much hyped" by XXL. The song's title refers to the hometowns of the rappers, with "D" being Detroit (Tee Grizzley's hometown) and "A" being Atlanta (where Lil Yachty is from).

== Composition ==
XXL stated that Tee Grizzley and Lil Yachty "trade rhyme schemes" on the track.

== Music video ==
Noisey called its music video "classic" due to the presence of helicopters.

== Charts ==
Chart (2017)	Peak position
US Bubbling Under Hot 100 (Billboard)	3
US Hot R&B/Hip-Hop Songs (Billboard)	48

== Certifications ==
Region	Certification	Certified units/sales
United States (RIAA)	5× Platinum	5,000,000^{‡}
^{‡} Sales+streaming figures based on certification alone.
