= Swear to God =

2024 single by Tee Grizzley featuring Future

Single by Tee Grizzley featuring Future

from the album Post Traumatic
- Released: May 10, 2024
- Genre: Hip hop
- Length: 3:00
- Label: Grizzley Gang; 300
- Songwriters: Terry Wallace Jr.; Nayvadius Cash; Wesley Glass; Lucas DePante
- Producers: Wheezy; Juke Wong

Tee Grizzley singles chronology
"Suffer in Silence" (2024)	"Swear to God" (2024)	"Robbery 7" (2024)

Future singles chronology
"Back to Back" (2024)	"Swear to God" (2024)	"Recipe for Love" (2024)

Music video
- "Swear to God" on YouTube

"Swear to God" is a song by American rapper Tee Grizzley featuring American rapper Future, released on May 10, 2024, as the second single from the former's fifth studio album, Post Traumatic (2024). It was produced by Wheezy and Juke Wong.

== Background ==
On May 9, 2024, Future teased the song by posting its opening line on X: "Fuck your album, shit ain't slapping like my mixtape". Many speculated it to be targeting rapper Gunna, who posted a series of tweets that were assumed as responses, but this was disproved upon the song's release.

== Composition ==
The song finds Tee Grizzley and Future boasting their wealthy lifestyles, to both their peers and enemies. Future hints at being one of the most successful rappers in the industry on the chorus, which begins the song.

== Critical reception ==
Zachary Horvath of HotNewHipHop gave a positive review of the song, writing "both artists do complement each other well and it makes sense." Shawn Grant of The Source described Tee Grizzley's verse as "confessional yet captivating".

== Music video ==
The music video was directed by Jerry Productions and released alongside the single. It sees the rappers in Miami, where they cruise in luxury cars including a Maybach, visit a jewelry store (rapping behind the counter), gas station and the restaurant Kiki On The River, and hang out on a massive yacht.

== Charts ==
Chart performance for "Swear to God"
Chart (2024)	Peak position
New Zealand Hot Singles (RMNZ)	38
US Bubbling Under Hot 100 (Billboard)	10
US Hot R&B/Hip-Hop Songs (Billboard)	40
