= Little Rock nightclub shooting =

2017 shootout in Arkansas, U.S.

- Location: 34.74357°N 92.27322°W; Little Rock, Arkansas, U.S.
- Date: July 1, 2017 c. 2:30 a.m. (CST)
- Attack type: Mass shooting, shootout
- Weapon: Firearm
- Deaths: None
- Injuries: 28+ (25 by gunfire; 2 seriously)
- Perpetrators: Tyler Jackson; Ricky Hampton; Kentrell Gwynn
- Accused: Cordero Ragland

Around 2:30 am on July 1, 2017, a shootout occurred at the Power Ultra Lounge nightclub in downtown Little Rock, Arkansas, United States. Twenty-eight people were injured and one hospitalized.

== Incident ==
On July 1, 2017, a mass shooting occurred at the Power Ultra Lounge in downtown Little Rock, Arkansas, around 2:30 AM CST. The shootout lasted eleven seconds and started about thirty seconds into a break from a concert by rapper Finesse2tymes. An eyewitness stated that the attack happened during the performance and was unexpected, with a large number of individuals lying on the floor in an attempt to avoid the bullets. He also stated, "People didn't know whether to run or stay down cause you couldn't see where he was. You could hear the gun shots. As soon as you saw people trying to run you see them run right back in."

A video from inside the club during the attack, which included audio of at least 24 rounds being fired in about 11 seconds, was posted by a friend of a victim to Facebook.

According to the Little Rock Police Department, 25 people were shot and three were hurt in other ways after a dispute that started in the club. Those shot were between the ages 16 and 35, with three others injured potentially from fleeing the scene. There were no fatalities related to the attack.

== Investigation ==
Police reported that they believed gang members were present at the shooting, and that there was a potentially gang aspect to the shooting. The Police Chief told reporters that "We do not believe this was an act of terror. Some sort of dispute ensued." Investigators also believe that multiple people fired during the event, instead of one single perpetrator. Eventually Tyler Jackson of Wrightsville, Arkansas, Ricky "Finesse2Tymes" Hampton and Kentrell Dominique "Dirt" Gwynn both of West Memphis, Arkansas were all arrested in connection with the shooting and Jackson, who was the first to fire a weapon in the shooting pled guilty to three counts of aggravated assault in exchange for a 20-year prison sentence, and Hampton pled guilty to being a felon in possession of a firearm and Gwynn pled guilty to aggravated assault for firing a gun during the melee. Both Hampton and Gwynn also pleaded guilty to federal charges that arose from the shooting investigation. Jackson’s sentence will run concurrently with a 20-year sentence murder and robbery of 14-year-old Cyncere Alexander about two weeks after the club shootout. However, as of July 2022, police are still looking for one more suspected shooter, Cordero Ragland. They captured Ragland after he killed someone while doing a drag race. While awaiting trial in 2021, he was attacked in jail by a convicted murderer and a block of concrete, which gave him brain damage. The judge dropped the charges against him and he was released. His family attempted to sue the county for gibs, but the jury ruled against them.

== Aftermath ==
The Mayor of Little Rock, Mark Stodola, said he plans to shut down Power Ultra Lounge as a result of the shooting. The venue, which is only zoned as a restaurant and not permitted to host events, also had its alcohol permit suspended by Alcoholic Beverage Control, which said it had been cited for 14 violations since 2012.

On July 11, members of the Pulaski County Quorum Court rejected a proposal by Justice Judy Green to encourage the county's cities to place a 180-day moratorium on performers and concerts which incite or promote violence. Instead, it was amended to encourage "civil discourse among residents" and "positive actions of empowerment and improvement", before passing unanimously. Opponents, including County Attorney Adam Fogleman and City Attorney Tom Carpenter, decried the original's loose definitions and potential to unconstitutionally limit free speech. Green admitted she knew it would not pass, but had wanted to draw media attention to her cause.

== See also ==
- Orlando nightclub shooting (2016)
- Columbus nightclub shooting
