= Finesse2tymes =

American rapper

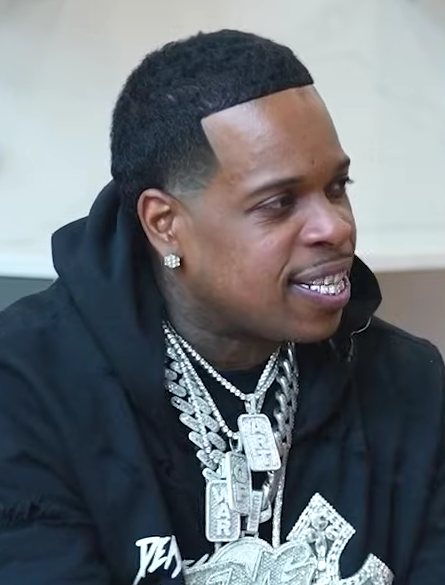
- Finesse2tymes in 2026

Background information
- Born: Ricky Hampton; June 10, 1992 (age 34); Memphis, Tennessee, U.S.
- Genres: Memphis rap; trap
- Occupations: Rapper; songwriter
- Years active: 2016–2017, 2022–present
- Labels: Atlantic; Bread Gang; Mob Ties; Rap-A-Lot; INgrooves

Ricky Hampton (born June 10, 1992), known professionally as Finesse2tymes, is an American rapper from Memphis, Tennessee. He is best known for his 2022 single "Back End," which entered the Billboard Hot 100. He is noted for his "thunderous voice" and motivational statements in his songs. He signed with Atlantic Records a joint venture with Moneybagg Yo's label Bread Gang and J. Prince's Mob Ties Records to release his debut commercial mixtape, 90 Days in December of that year. His debut studio album, Art of War (2024), failed to chart.

== Career ==
In 2012, when he was 20, Hampton, along with Moneybagg Yo, Blac Youngsta, and other Memphis rappers, formed the rap collective Memphis Greatest Underrated. The group released a self-titled EP in 2016.

In 2019, he gained traction with the release of his mixtape Hustle & Flow. Finesse2tymes also had a fallout with Moneybagg Yo. In September 2022, both artists ended their feud and Finesse2tymes was signed to Moneybagg Yo's label Bread Gang. He also released his single "Black Visa" with the latter. In October 2022, he signed to J Prince Jr.'s record label Mob Ties in a distribution deal with Atlantic Records. Also in October 2022, he released his single "Gucci Flow" with American rapper Gucci Mane. His single "Back End" gained traction on social media platform TikTok. In December 2022, he released his mixtape 90 Days with appearances from rappers Gucci Mane, Moneybagg Yo, Lil Baby and producer Tay Keith.

== Legal issues ==
In 2010, Hampton was convicted in Tennessee of two felony counts of aggravated robbery, and was given an 8-year sentence. After serving six years, he was released in August 2016.

On July 1, 2017, Hampton was performing at the Power Ultra Lounge nightclub in Little Rock, Arkansas when multiple shots were fired. The following day in Birmingham, Alabama, he was taken into custody by the U.S. Marshals on charges unrelated to the shooting. Federal prosecutors announced that Hampton was charged in connection with a June 25, 2017, incident, in which prosecutors alleged Hampton fired an "AK-style pistol" at a person in a vehicle after a verbal altercation outside a nightclub in Forrest City, Arkansas. Hampton pled guilty to one count of being a felon in possession of a firearm, and was sentenced to five years in prison in December 2018. He was released from federal custody on July 1, 2022.

In July 2023, the Houston Police Department issued an arrest warrant for Hampton, charging him with theft between $30,000 and $150,000, after an Enterprise rental car he was said to be driving was not returned. The charges were dropped later that month.

== Discography ==
=== Studio albums ===
Title	Album details
Art of War	Released: November 22, 2024; Label: Atlantic, Mob Ties; Format: Digital download, streaming

=== Compilation albums ===
Title	Album details
Singlez	Released: July 7, 2013; Label: FNG, Mob Ties; Format: Digital download, streaming

=== Mixtapes ===
List of mixtapes, with selected details
Title	Mixtape details	Peak chart positions		
Title	Mixtape details	US	US R&B/HH	US Rap
Goin Straight In	Released: December 16, 2016; Label: FNG, Mob Ties; Format: Digital download, streaming	—	—	—
Hustle & Flow	Released: May 29, 2017; Label: FNG, Mob Ties; Format: Digital download, streaming	—	—	—
Federal 4 Real: Free Finesse	Released: March 15, 2019; Label: FNG, Mob Ties; Format: Digital download, streaming	—	—	—
90 Days	Released: December 2, 2022; Label: Atlantic; Format: CD, download	57	21	13
"—" denotes a recording that did not chart or was not released in that territory.

=== Singles ===
List of charting singles, showing year released and album name
Title	Year	Peak chart positions	Certifications	Album
Title	Year	US	Certifications	Album
"First 48"	2019	—		Hustle & Flow
"Get Even"	2022	—	RIAA: Gold	90 Days
"Back End"	2022	86	RIAA: Platinum	90 Days
"Gucci Flow" (with Gucci Mane)	2022	—		So Icy Boyz 22

=== Other certified songs ===
Title	Year	Certifications	Album
"Overdose"	2022	RIAA: Gold	90 Days
