= Scriptures (Tee Grizzley album) =

Studio album by Tee Grizzley
- Released: June 7, 2019
- Genre: Hip hop; trap
- Length: 40:04
- Label: 300
- Producer: Timbaland (also exec.); ATL Jacob; Ambezza; Angel Lopez; Bastian Völkel; Chopsquad DJ; Cosa Nostra Beats; Federico Vindver; Helluva; Hunnid; Keanu Beats; Lazlow 808; Malcolm Anthony; Rxney; Scxtt; Shucati; Sim

Tee Grizzley chronology
Still My Moment (2018)	Scriptures (2019)	The Smartest (2020)

Singles from Scriptures
- 1. "God's Warrior" Released: December 22, 2018; 2. "Locked Up" Released: May 10, 2019; 3. "Sweet Thangs" Released: May 29, 2019

Scriptures is the second studio album by American rapper Tee Grizzley. It was released on June 7, 2019, by 300 Entertainment. Executive-produced by Timbaland, it features guest appearances from YNW Melly and A Boogie wit da Hoodie, and was supported by three singles: "God's Warrior", "Locked Up" and "Sweet Thangs".

== Commercial performance ==
Scriptures debuted at number 20 on the US Billboard 200 dated June 17, 2019, with 20,524 album-equivalent units (including 1248 pure album sales).

== Track listing ==
Adapted from Spotify.

No.	Title	Writer(s)	Producer(s)	Length
1.	"Scriptures / Intro"	Terry Wallace; Timothy Mosley; Angel Lopez; Federico Vindver	Timbaland; Shucati; Lazlow 808; Lopez; Vindver	2:48
2.	"Sweet Thangs"	Wallace; Mosley; Jose Velazquez; Tim Friedrich; Christoph Bauss; Bastian Völkel; Luca Starz	Timbaland; Shucati; Lopez; Vindver; Völkel	2:51
3.	"Heroes"	Wallace	Timbaland; Keanu Beats; Hunnid; Lopez; Vindver	2:55
4.	"No Talkin"	Wallace	Chopsquad DJ; ATL Jacob; Sim	2:19
5.	"Had To"	Wallace	Timbaland; Keanu Beats; Cosa Nostra Beats; Lopez; Vindver	1:57
6.	"Locksmith"	Wallace	Timbaland; Lopez; Vindver	1:58
7.	"Gods Warriors"	Wallace	Timbaland; Keanu Beats; Ambezza; Lopez; Vindver	1:56
8.	"Locked Up"	Wallace; Malcolm Anthony	Rxney	3:24
9.	"Add Me Up"	Wallace	Helluva	2:13
10.	"More Than Friends"	Wallace	Timbaland; Shucati; Lopez; Vindver	2:34
11.	"Overseas"	Wallace	Chopsquad DJ	3:34
12.	"Million Dollar Foreign"	Wallace	Timbaland; Keanu Beats; SCXTT; Lopez; Vindver	3:13
13.	"Preach"	Wallace	Chopsquad DJ	2:52
14.	"Young Grizzley World" (featuring YNW Melly and A Boogie wit da Hoodie)	Wallace; Jamell Demons; Artist Dubose	Chopsquad DJ	5:32
Total length:				40:04

== Charts ==
Chart (2019)	Peak position
Canadian Albums (Billboard)	43
US Billboard 200	20
