= Blac Youngsta =

American rapper (born 1990)

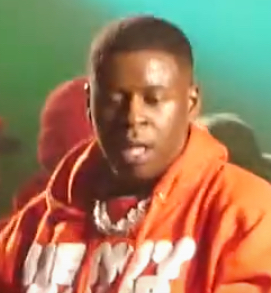
- Blac Youngsta performing in 2021

Background information
- Born: Sammie Marquez Benson; April 8, 1990 (age 36); Memphis, Tennessee, U.S.
- Genres: Southern hip-hop; trap
- Occupations: Rapper; songwriter
- Years active: 2012–present
- Labels: Create; Heavy Camp; Collective; Epic
- Website: heavycamphc.com

Sammie Marquez Benson (born April 8, 1990), known professionally as Blac Youngsta, is an American rapper from Memphis, Tennessee. He signed a recording contract with fellow Memphis-based rapper Yo Gotti's record label, Collective Music Group (CMG), in 2015, which entered a joint venture with Epic Records shortly after. He is best known for his 2017 singles "Hip Hopper" (featuring Lil Yachty) and "Booty"; the latter of which peaked at number 73 on the Billboard Hot 100. Both songs received gold certifications by the Recording Industry Association of America (RIAA) and preceded the release of his debut studio album, 223 (2018), which peaked at number 42 on the Billboard 200. His second album, Church on Sunday (2019), peaked at number 91 and served as his final release with Epic.

== Early life ==
Benson was born on April 8, 1990, and raised on McMillan Street, a poor area in South Memphis, Tennessee. Benson and his younger brothers were raised by their grandparents. Despite both of his grandparents having jobs, they earned very little and struggled to put food on the table. Benson's grandfather managed to get him a job at a local grocery store when he was just 7 years old. However, he was fired when the manager caught him placing fake orders to the store to take the food home for him and his brothers. After losing his job at the store, Benson began selling drugs and served numerous sentences in prison for drug and gun charges. In 2012, after serving a year in prison, Benson began hosting local block parties, making him locally popular in South Memphis. Shortly after, he began pursuing a music career, releasing his debut mixtape Fast Bricks in 2012.

== Career ==
=== 2012–2016: Early career and signing to CMG ===
Taking the stage name Blac Youngsta, Benson began taking his recording career more seriously in 2012. From 2012 to 2014, he released three mixtapes as part of his Fast Bricks series.

His breakout song "Heavy" was released in 2015 and gained the attention of Yo Gotti, who appeared on the song's remix and signed Blac Youngsta to his Collective Music Group label. Blac Youngsta's first mixtape as a member of CMG, I Swear To God, was released on September 24, 2015, and featured guest appearances from Yo Gotti and Boosie Badazz. In March 2016, Blac Youngsta released a mixtape titled Young & Reckless, followed by Fuck Everybody, released in September 2016, with features from Young Thug, Quavo, Jacquees, and YFN Lucci. He was featured on American rapper Travis Scott's 2016 song "Coordinate," which was included as the third track from Scott's album Birds in the Trap Sing McKnight (2016).

=== 2017–2019: Epic Records and major label debut ===
In February 2017, Blac Youngsta released Illuminati, his fourth mixtape as a member of CMG, with guest appearances from Kodak Black, Lil Yachty, and Slim Jxmmi. After Blac Youngsta turned himself in for his involvement in a shooting targeted towards Yo Gotti's longtime rival, Young Dolph, a "Free Blac Youngsta" grassroots movement was started, with fellow rapper Young Thug releasing a song of the same name on May 17, 2017. After his release, Blac Youngsta established his label imprint under CMG, Heavy Camp, and released a mixtape titled, I'm Innocent, in June 2017, with guest appearances from Slim Jxmmi and Ty Dolla Sign. In December 2017, Blac Youngsta signed his first major label deal with Epic Records.

In February 2018, Youngsta released his debut studio album, 223, through Epic, with guest appearances from Lil Yachty, Travis Scott, and French Montana. The album charted on the Billboard 200, peaking at number 42. The album also spawned the successful single "Booty", which charted on the Billboard Hot 100, peaking at number 73 and was certified Gold by the Recording Industry Association of America (RIAA). In August 2018, Blac Youngsta released a sequel to his 2016 mixtape, Fuck Everybody, with Fuck Everybody 2, featuring a sole guest appearance from Lil Pump, which also charted on the Billboard 200, peaking at number 63.

In May 2019, Blac Youngsta released his EP, Cut Up. In August 2019, Blac Youngsta announced via Twitter that his second studio album would be called Church on Sunday. In October 2019, Blac Youngsta also announced an international tour of the same name, starting in November 2019. Church on Sunday was released at the end of the same month, and the project features guest appearances from major artists including T.I., Yo Gotti, Moneybagg Yo, DaBaby, Jacquees, City Girls, Tory Lanez, G-Eazy, PnB Rock, Wiz Khalifa, Ty Dolla $ign, and Chris Brown.

=== 2020–present: More charting singles ===
In January 2020, he was featured on Moneybagg Yo's song "1 2 3," later released as a single in April 2020 and chart on the Hot R&B/Hip-Hop Songs chart, earning him his second charting single on that chart.

== Heavy Camp ==
Heavy Camp
- Founded: 2017
- Founder: Sammie Benson (Blac Youngsta)
- Status: Active
- Distributor: Collective Music Group
- Genre: Hip hop; trap; Southern hip hop
- Country of origin: U.S
- Location: Memphis, Tennessee
- Official website: https://heavycampshop.com

Heavy Camp is a record label imprint under Yo Gotti's Collective Music Group (CMG), founded by Blac Youngsta in 2017. Memphis native Julien Anderson was named the label's president in 2019.

== Personal life ==
On August 18, 2023, Blac Youngsta's brother was shot and killed at a convenience store in Memphis, Tennessee.

=== Legal issues ===
On January 8, 2016, police were called to a Wells Fargo branch in downtown Atlanta, Georgia, after Blac Youngsta withdrew $200,000 from his bank account to purchase a car. Workers allegedly believed Blac Youngsta was robbing the bank after he was seen leaving the bank with the money. Youngsta and his associates were released at the scene. Youngsta later accused the police and staff at the bank of racial profiling, claiming he was arrested for being "young and black".

On May 16, 2017, Blac Youngsta surrendered himself to police on charges related to a shooting involving fellow Memphis rapper Young Dolph, in which Youngsta and his associates are alleged to have fired over 100 rounds into Young Dolph's SUV. Blac Youngsta had maintained that he was innocent before turning himself in. He was released on bond the same day, charged with six counts of discharging a weapon into an occupied dwelling or moving vehicle and felony conspiracy. In May 2019, the charges were dropped.

== Discography ==
=== Studio albums ===
List of albums, with selected chart positions
Title	Album details	Peak chart positions		
Title	Album details	US	US R&B/HH	US Rap
223	Released: February 23, 2018; Label: Heavy Camp, CMG, Epic; Format: Digital download	42	22	17
Church on Sunday	Released: November 29, 2019; Label: Heavy Camp, CMG, Epic; Format: Digital download, streaming	91	42	—
4LIFE	Released: May 12, 2022; Label: Heavy Camp, Create Music Group; Format: Digital download, streaming	—	—	—
"—" denotes a recording that did not chart or was not released in that territory.

=== Compilation albums ===
Title	Details	Peak chart positions
Title	Details	US
Gangsta Art (with CMG the Label)	Released: July 15, 2022; Label: CMG, Interscope; Format: Digital download, streaming	11
Gangsta Art 2 (with CMG the Label)	Released: September 29, 2023; Label: CMG, Interscope; Format: Digital download, streaming	—

=== Mixtapes ===
List of mixtapes, with selected chart positions
Title	Details	Peak chart positions		
Title	Details	US	US R&B/HH	US Rap
Fast Bricks	Released: 2012; Label: Self-released; Format: Digital download	—	—	—
Fast Bricks 2	Released: April 17, 2012; Label: Self-released; Format: Digital download	—	—	—
Fast Bricks 3	Released: July 1, 2014; Label: Self-released; Format: Digital download	—	—	—
I Swear to God	Released: September 24, 2015; Label: CMG; Format: Digital download	—	—	—
Young & Reckless	Released: March 16, 2016; Label: CMG; Format: Digital download	—	—	—
Fuck Everybody	Released: September 8, 2016; Label: CMG; Format: Digital download	—	—	—
Illuminati	Released: February 24, 2017; Label: CMG; Format: Digital download	—	—	—
Can't Fake The Real (with DaBoyDame & Mozzy)	Released: May 19, 2017; Label: CMG; Format: Digital download	—	—	—
I'm Innocent	Released: June 9, 2017; Label: Heavy Camp, CMG; Format: Digital download, streaming	—	—	—
Fuck Everybody 2	Released: August 31, 2018; Label: Heavy Camp, CMG, Epic; Format: Digital download, streaming	63	32	—
Code Red (with Moneybagg Yo)	Released: September 18, 2020; Label: N-Less, Interscope, CMG, Epic; Format: Digital download, streaming	6	5	4
Fuck Everybody 3	Released: November 13, 2020; Label: Epic; Format: Digital download, streaming	143	—	—
Bank Appointment	Released: February 23, 2023; Label: Heavy Camp, Create Music Group; Format: Digital download, streaming	—	—	—
Blac Sheep	Released: April 6, 2023; Label: Heavy Camp, Create Music Group; Format: Digital download, streaming	—	—	—
Blac Sheep 2	Released: August 29, 2023; Label: Heavy Camp, Create Music Group; Format: Digital download, streaming	—	—	—
"—" denotes a recording that did not chart or was not released in that territory.

=== Extended plays ===
Title	Details
Cut Up	Released: May 3, 2019; Label: Heavy Camp, CMG, Epic; Format: Digital download

=== Singles ===
==== As lead artist ====
List of singles as lead artist, with selected chart positions, showing year released and album name
Title	Year	Peak chart positions						Certifications	Album
Title	Year	US	US R&B/HH	US Main. R&B/HH	US Rhy.	US R&B/HH Air.	US Rap Air.	Certifications	Album
"Heavy" (featuring Yo Gotti)	2015	—	—	—	—	—	—		Non-album singles
"Beat It" (featuring Rich Homie Quan)	2016	—	—	—	—	—	—		Non-album singles
"Hip Hopper" (featuring Lil Yachty)	2017	— (Note: "Hip Hopper" did not enter the Billboard Hot 100, but peaked at number 21 on the Bubbling Under Hot 100 Singles chart.)	— (Note: "Hip Hopper" did not enter the Hot R&B/Hip-Hop Songs chart, but peaked at number three on the Bubbling Under R&B/Hip-Hop Singles chart.)	—	—	—	—	RIAA: Gold	Illuminati & 223
"Birthday"	2017	—	—	—	—	—	—		I'm Innocent
"Booty"	2017	73	35	4	22	5	6	RIAA: Gold	I'm Innocent & 223
"Cut Up" (solo or remix featuring Tory Lanez and G-Eazy)	2019	—	—	17	—	24	18		Church on Sunday
"Lay Down"	2019	—	—	—	—	—	—		Non-album single
"Court Tomorrow"	2019	—	—	—	—	—	—		Church On Sunday
"Like a Pro" (featuring DaBaby)	2019	—	—	—	—	—	—		Church On Sunday
"I Met Tay Keith First" (featuring Lil Baby and Moneybagg Yo)	2020	—	—	—	—	—	—		Fuck Everybody 3
"Where They Do That"	2020	—	—	—	—	—	—		Fuck Everybody 3
"Saving Money" (featuring DaBaby)	2020	—	—	—	—	—	—		Fuck Everybody 3
"Anythang"	2022	—	—	—	—	—	—		4LIFE
"I'm Assuming"	2022	—	—	—	—	—	—		4LIFE
"Threat" (with 42 Dugg)	2022	—	—	—	—	—	—		4LIFE
"Can't Spell"	2022	—	—	—	—	—	—		4LIFE
"—" denotes a recording that did not chart or was not released in that territory.

==== As featured artist ====
Title	Year	Peak chart positions						Certifications	Album
Title	Year	US Bub.	US R&B/HH	US Main. R&B/HH	US Rhy.	US R&B/HH Air.	US Rap Air.	Certifications	Album
"Wait for It" (Yo Gotti featuring Blac Youngsta)	2016	—	—	—	—	—	—		Non-album singles
"YNS" (YG featuring Blac Youngsta & YFN Lucci)	2017	—	—	—	—	—	—		Non-album singles
"Goal Line" (T-Pain featuring Blac Youngsta)	2017	—	—	—	—	—	—		Oblivion
"Sumn" (Lil Bibby featuring Blac Youngsta)	2017	—	—	—	—	—	—		Non-album singles
"Drop" (G-Eazy featuring Blac Youngsta & BlocBoy JB)	2018	—	—	—	—	—	—		Non-album singles
"Cheat on Me" (Tommie Lee featuring Blac Youngsta)	2018	—	—	—	—	—	—		Non-album singles
"Run It Up" (DDG featuring YBN Nahmir, G Herbo & Blac Youngsta)	2018	—	—	—	—	—	—		Non-album singles
"Blac Money" (Moneybagg Yo featuring Blac Youngsta)	2019	—	—	—	—	—	—		43va Heartless
"1 2 3" (Moneybagg Yo featuring Blac Youngsta)	2020	1	43	5	36	6	12	RIAA: Gold	Time Served
"Steppers" (Yo Gotti, Moneybagg Yo and 42 Dugg featuring CMG the Label, EST Gee, Mozzy and Blac Youngsta)	2022	4	26	—	—	—	—		Gangsta Art
"Gangsta Art" (Yo Gotti and Moneybagg Yo featuring EST Gee, Mozzy, Lehla Samia, 42 Dugg and Blac Youngsta)	2022	17	41	—	—	—	—		Gangsta Art

== Awards and nominations ==
=== ASCAP Rhythm & Soul Music Awards ===
Year	Nominee / work	Award	Result
2019	"Booty"	Award Winning R&B/Hip Hop Songs	Won

== Tours ==
=== Headlining ===
- I Swear to God Tour (2015)
- Young & Reckless Tour (2016)
- I'm Innocent Tour (2017)
- Pull Up Tour (2018)
- Church on Sunday International Tour (2019)
