= First Day Out (Tee Grizzley song) =

Single by Tee Grizzley

from the album My Moment
- Released: November 7, 2016
- Recorded: October 2016
- Studio: United Sound Systems, Detroit, Michigan
- Genre: Hip hop
- Length: 4:14
- Label: 300
- Songwriters: Terry Wallace; Martin McCurtis
- Producer: Helluva

Tee Grizzley singles chronology
"First Day Out" (2016)	"Second Day Out" (2017)

"First Day Out" is the debut single by American rapper Tee Grizzley. It was released on November 7, 2016, by 300 Entertainment as the lead single from his debut mixtape, My Moment (2017). It was written by Tee Grizzley and Helluva, and produced by the latter.

The single peaked at number 48 on the US Billboard Hot 100.

== Background ==
Tee Grizzley was released from Michigan prison in October 2016 and recorded the song on the same day.

This song is about how he went to jail, what it was like, and how it felt when he was released. The song went viral in a video of then Cleveland Cavaliers player LeBron James taking a video to this song, creating the "LeBron James Challenge", where people post videos of themselves reenacting James's movements in the video. The song gained more traction in 2024 following the song being used in edits of James.

== Music video ==
The music video of "First Day Out" was uploaded to YouTube on Joseph McFashion's "4sho Magazine" channel on November 7, 2016. It was directed by Nick Margetic and Everett Stewart.

== Remix ==
On February 5, 2018, the official remix was released featuring American rapper Meek Mill.

== Charts ==
=== Weekly charts ===
Chart (2017)	Peak position
US Billboard Hot 100	48
US Hot R&B/Hip-Hop Songs (Billboard)	18

=== Year-end charts ===
Chart (2017)	Position
US Hot R&B/Hip-Hop Songs (Billboard)	55

== Certifications ==
Region	Certification	Certified units/sales
United States (RIAA)	6× Platinum	6,000,000^{‡}
^{‡} Sales+streaming figures based on certification alone.
