= Helluva (producer) =

American record producer (born 1977)

- Also known as: Helli Hanson
- Born: Martin McCurtis; May 7, 1977 (age 49); Detroit, Michigan, U.S.
- Genres: Hip hop; R&B; trap
- Occupation: Record producer
- Years active: 2000–present

Martin McCurtis (born May 7, 1977), known professionally as Helluva, is an American record producer from Detroit, Michigan. He is known for producing songs for fellow Michigan native Tee Grizzley, including the 2016 single "First Day Out".

== Early life ==
Martin McCurtis was born in Detroit and raised on the Southwest side of the city.

== Career ==
Helluva began his career as a rap artist and producer for the independent record labels Made West Entertainment and Watchout Entertainment. Early on, he assisted local rappers, and later worked with Akon and Yo Gotti. His son "came up with his famous 'Helluva Made This Beat Baby' drop". He also produced Tee Grizzley and Lil Yachty's single, From the D to the A. In 2018, he produced tracks on Still My Moment and The Pimp Tape . In 2019, Helluva was the musical director for the independent film Out of Bounds, and in 2020, he produced tracks for Megan Thee Stallion's Suga EP.

== Influence ==
Okayplayer wrote, "Helluva is bringing Detroit street rap to the mainstream," and Detroit Metro Times called Helluva "the musical architect" of "Detroit trap".
