= Swae Lee discography =

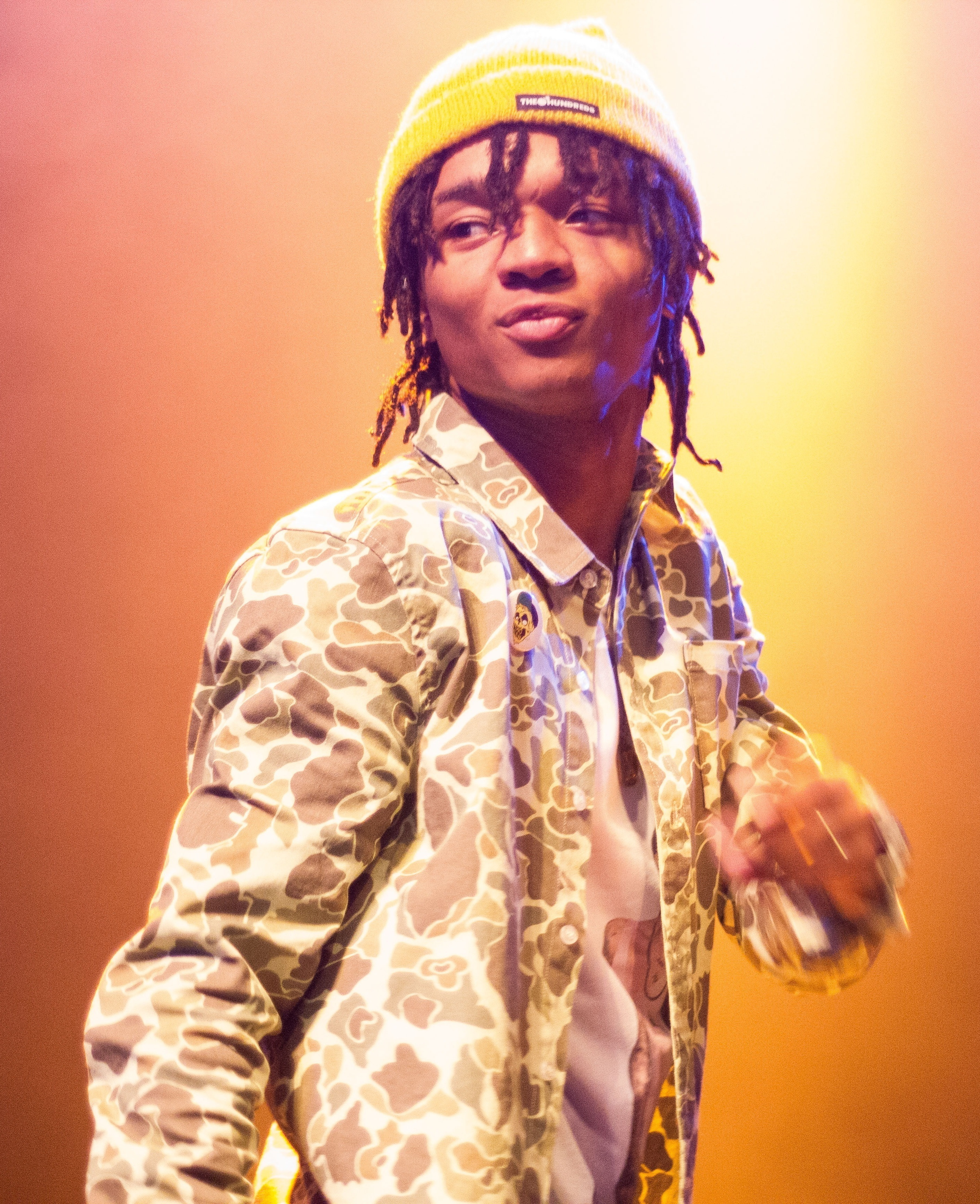
- Swae Lee performing in 2015
- Studio albums: 1
- Singles: 24
- Music videos: 4

American rapper and singer Swae Lee has released one studio album, 24 singles (including 12 as a featured artist) and four music videos.

== Studio albums ==
List of albums, with release date and label shown
Title	Album details	Peak chart positions			
Title	Album details	US	US R&B/HH	US Rap	CAN
Same Difference	Released: April 3, 2026; Label: EarDrummers, Interscope; Formats: Digital download, streaming	—	—	—	—

== Singles ==
=== As lead artist ===
List of singles as a lead artist, with year released and album name
Title	Year	Peak chart positions									Certifications	Album
Title	Year	US	US R&B/HH	US Rap	AUS	CAN	NZ	SWE	SWI	UK	Certifications	Album
"Hurt to Look"	2018	—	—	—	—	—	—	—	—	—		Swaecation
"Guatemala" (credited as part of Rae Sremmurd)	2018	84	39	—	—	39	— (Note: "Guatemala" did not enter the NZ Top 40 Singles Chart, but peaked at number 36 on the NZ Hot Singles Chart.)	— (Note: "Guatemala" did not enter the Sverigetopplistan, but peaked at number 17 on the Swedish Heatseeker chart.)	71	68	RIAA: Platinum; BPI: Gold; MC: Platinum; RMNZ: Gold	Swaecation
"Sunflower" (with Post Malone)	2018	1	1	1	1	1	1	4	22	3	RIAA: 20× Platinum; ARIA: 20× Platinum; BPI: 6× Platinum; MC: Diamond; RMNZ: 12× Platinum	Spider-Man: Into the Spider-Verse and Hollywood's Bleeding
"Close to Me" (with Ellie Goulding and Diplo)	2018	24	—	—	25	24	17	38	53	17	RIAA: Platinum; ARIA: 2× Platinum; BPI: Platinum; MC: Platinum; RMNZ: 2× Platinum	Brightest Blue
"Better to Lie" (with Benny Blanco and Jesse)	2018	—	—	—	—	—	—	—	—	—		Friends Keep Secrets
"Christmas at Swae's"	2018	—	—	—	—	—	—	—	—	—		Non-album single
"Crave" (with Madonna)	2019	— (Note: "Crave" did not enter the Billboard Hot 100, but peaked at number 11 on the Adult Contemporary chart.)	—	—	—	—	—	—	—	— (Note: "Crave" did not enter the UK Singles Chart but peaked at 49 on the component digital chart.)		Madame X
"Sextasy"	2019	—	—	—	—	—	— (Note: "Sextasy" did not enter the NZ Top 40 Singles Chart, but peaked at number 28 on the NZ Hot Singles Chart.)	—	—	—		Non-album singles
"Won't Be Late" (featuring Drake)	2019	75	30	3	—	34	— (Note: "Won't Be Late" did not enter the NZ Top 40 Singles Chart, but peaked at number 10 on the NZ Hot Singles Chart.)	— (Note: "Won't Be Late" did not enter the Swedish Singellista Chart, but peaked at number one on the Swedish Heatseeker Chart.)	60	50	RIAA: Gold	Non-album singles
"Out of Your Mind" (with French Montana featuring Chris Brown)	2020	—	—	—	—	—	—	80	—	—		Montana
"Roxanne" (Remix) (with Arizona Zervas)	2020	—	—	—	—	—	—	—	—	—		Non-album singles
"Someone Said"	2020	—	—	—	—	—	— (Note: "Someone Said" did not enter the NZ Top 40 Singles Chart, but peaked at number 32 on the NZ Hot Singles Chart.)	—	—	—		Non-album singles
"Reality Check"	2020	—	—	—	—	—	— (Note: "Reality Check" did not enter the NZ Top 40 Singles Chart, but peaked at number 28 on the NZ Hot Singles Chart.)	—	—	—		Non-album singles
"Be Like That" (with Kane Brown and Khalid)	2020	19	—	—	53	6	—	—	—	—	RIAA: 4× Platinum; ARIA: Gold; BPI: Silver; RMNZ: Platinum	Mixtape, Vol. 1
"Dance Like No One's Watching"	2020	—	—	—	—	—	—	—	—	—		Non-album single
"Krabby Step" (with Tyga and Lil Mosey)	2020	—	—	—	—	—	—	—	—	—		Sponge on the Run
"Too Bizarre" (with Skrillex and Siiickbrain)	2021	—	—	—	—	—	—	—	—	—		Non-album single
"In the Dark" (with Jhené Aiko)	2021	—	—	—	—	—	—	—	—	—		Shang-Chi and the Legend of the Ten Rings
"Play Stupid" (with Strick)	2021	—	—	—	—	—	—	—	—	—		Strick Land
"Too Bizarre (Juked)" (with Skrillex, Siickbrain and Posij)	2023	—	—	—	—	—	—	—	—	—		Quest for Fire
"Calling" (with Metro Boomin and Nav featuring A Boogie wit da Hoodie)	2023	41	13	8	27	18	25	—	—	56	ARIA: Gold	Spider-Man: Across the Spider-Verse
"Wish U Well" (with French Montana featuring Lojay and Jess Glynne)	2023	—	—	—	—	—	—	—	—	—		Non-album singles
"Street Sweeper" (with Chase B)	2023	—	—	—	—	—	—	—	—	—		Non-album singles
"Airplane Tickets" (with Pharrell Williams and Rauw Alejandro)	2023	—	—	—	—	—	— (Note: "Airplane Tickets" did not enter the NZ Top 40 Singles Chart, but peaked at number 40 on the NZ Hot Singles Chart.)	—	—	—		Non-album singles
"My Life" (with Steve Aoki, David Guetta and PnB Rock)	2025	—	—	—	—	—	—	—	—	—		Non-album singles
"Flammable"	2026	—	—	—	—	—	—	—	—	—		Same Difference
"Don't Even Call" (with Rich the Kid)	2026	—	—	—	—	—	—	—	—	—		Same Difference
"—" denotes that the song did not chart or was not released in that territory.

=== As featured artist ===
List of singles as featured artist, with year released, selected chart positions, and album name
Title	Year	Peak chart positions								Certifications	Album
Title	Year	US	US R&B/ HH	US Rap	AUS	CAN	IRE	NZ	UK	Certifications	Album
"Drinks on Us" (Mike Will Made It featuring The Weeknd, Swae Lee and Future)	2015	—	— (Note: "Drinks On Us" did not enter the Billboard Hot R&B/Hip-Hop Songs, but peaked at number five on the Bubbling Under R&B/Hip-Hop chart.)	—	—	—	—	—	—	RIAA: Gold	Ransom
"Unforgettable" (French Montana featuring Swae Lee)	2017	3	2	1	7	3	2	6	2	RIAA: 11× Platinum; ARIA: 13× Platinum; BPI: 7× Platinum; MC: 9× Platinum; RMNZ: 7× Platinum	Jungle Rules
"Sativa" (Jhené Aiko featuring Swae Lee or Rae Sremmurd)	2018	74	32	—	—	—	—	—	—	RIAA: 5× Platinum; BPI: Silver; RMNZ: 2× Platinum	Trip
"Hopeless Romantic" (Wiz Khalifa featuring Swae Lee)	2018	72	30	25	—	83	—	—	—	RIAA: Platinum; RMNZ: Gold	Rolling Papers II
"Real Friends" (Remix) (Camila Cabello featuring Swae Lee)	2018	—	—	—	—	—	99	— (Note: "Real Friends" did not enter the NZ Top 40 Singles Chart, but peaked at number 12 on the NZ Hot Singles Chart.)	—	BPI: Silver	Non-album single
"Arms Around You" (XXXTentacion and Lil Pump featuring Maluma and Swae Lee)	2018	28	16	—	14	13	8	15	14	RIAA: Platinum; ARIA: Platinum; BPI: Gold; RMNZ: Platinum	Non-album singles
"Diva" (Aazar featuring Swae Lee and Tove Lo)	2019	—	—	—	—	—	—	—	—		Non-album singles
"Walking" (Joji and Jackson Wang featuring Swae Lee and Major Lazer)	2019	—	—	—	—	—	—	—	—		Head in the Clouds II
"Thrusting" (Internet Money featuring Swae Lee and Future)	2020	—	—	—	—	—	—	—	—		B4 the Storm
"LALA (Unlocked)" (Alicia Keys featuring Swae Lee)	2021	—	—	—	—	—	—	—	—		Keys
"Different Breed" (Mike Will Made It featuring Swae Lee and Latto)	2023	—	—	—	—	—	—	—	—		Non-album singles
"Work It Out" (Purple Tears featuring Swae Lee)	2023	—	—	—	—	—	—	—	—		Non-album singles
"20 More Minutes" (Yung Q featuring Swae Lee)	2023	—	—	—	—	—	—	—	—		Non-album singles
"Run Through" (The Plug and Stefflon Don featuring Swae Lee)	2023	—	—	—	—	—	—	—	—		Non-album singles
"Different Breed" (Mike Will Made It featuring Swae Lee and Latto)	2023	—	—	—	—	—	—	—	—		Non-album singles
"—" denotes that the song did not chart or was not released in that territory.

=== Promotional singles ===
List of promotional singles, showing year released and album name
Title	Year	Album
"BirdWatching" (GenoDaBoss featuring Veli Sosa and Swae Lee)	2016	Non-album singles
"Ball Out the Lot" (BoBo Swae featuring Swae Lee)	2016	Non-album singles
"Ball Is Life" (featuring Jack Harlow)	2021	Madden NFL 22

== Other charted songs ==
List of other charted songs, with selected chart positions, showing year released and album name
Title	Year	Peak chart positions									Certifications	Album
Title	Year	US	US R&B/ HH	US R&B	AUS	CAN	NZ	SWE	UK	UK R&B	Certifications	Album
"Nightcrawler" (Travis Scott featuring Swae Lee and Chief Keef)	2015	— (Note: "Nightcrawler" did not enter the Billboard Hot 100, but peaked at number 12 on the Bubbling Under Hot 100 Singles chart.)	45	—	—	68	—	—	—	—	RIAA: Platinum; BPI: Silver; RMNZ: Gold	Rodeo
"Poor Fool" (2 Chainz featuring Swae Lee)	2017	—	— (Note: "Poor Fool" did not enter the Billboard Hot R&B/Hip-Hop Songs, but peaked at number six on the Bubbling Under R&B/Hip-Hop chart.)	—	—	—	—	—	—	—		Pretty Girls Like Trap Music
"The Ways" (with Khalid)	2018	63	31	—	—	53	—	96	54	29	RMNZ: Gold	Black Panther: The Album
"Spoil My Night" (Post Malone featuring Swae Lee)	2018	15	10	—	19	12	— (Note: "Spoil My Night" did not enter the NZ Top 40 Singles Chart, but peaked at number one on the NZ Heatseeker Singles Chart.)	32	—	—	RIAA: Platinum; ARIA: Platinum; BPI: Silver; MC: Platinum; RMNZ: Gold	Beerbongs & Bentleys
"R.I.P. Screw" (Travis Scott featuring Swae Lee)	2018	26	17	—	—	28	—	— (Note: "R.I.P. Screw" did not enter the Swedish Singellista Chart, but peaked at number three on the Swedish Heatseeker Chart.)	—	—	RIAA: Platinum; ARIA: Gold; MC: Platinum	Astroworld
"Chun Swae" (Nicki Minaj featuring Swae Lee)	2018	— (Note: "Chun Swae" did not enter the Billboard Hot 100, but peaked at number seven on the Bubbling Under Hot 100 Singles chart.)	— (Note: "Chun Swae" did not enter the Billboard Hot R&B/Hip-Hop Songs, but peaked at number four on the Bubbling Under R&B/Hip-Hop chart.)	—	—	—	—	—	—	—		Queen
"Dreamcatcher" (Metro Boomin featuring Swae Lee and Travis Scott)	2018	72	36	—	—	68	—	—	—	—	ARIA: Gold	Not All Heroes Wear Capes
"Borrowed Love" (Metro Boomin featuring Swae Lee and Wizkid)	2018	— (Note: "Borrowed Love" did not enter the Billboard Hot 100, but peaked at number 11 on the Bubbling Under Hot 100 Singles chart.)	— (Note: "Borrowed Love" did not enter the Billboard Hot R&B/Hip-Hop Songs, but peaked at number five on the Bubbling Under R&B/Hip-Hop chart.)	—	—	93	—	—	—	—		Not All Heroes Wear Capes
"Creature" (Pop Smoke featuring Swae Lee)	2020	57	33	—	—	44	—	—	—	—		Shoot for the Stars, Aim for the Moon
"Genius" (with Pop Smoke and Lil Tjay)	2021	— (Note: "Genius" did not enter the Billboard Hot 100, but peaked at number five on the Bubbling Under Hot 100 Singles chart.)	46	—	72	54	—	—	—	—		Faith
"Annihilate" (with Metro Boomin, Lil Wayne, and Offset)	2023	44	14	9	33	23	34	—	59	29	ARIA: Gold	Spider-Man: Across the Spider-Verse (Soundtrack from and Inspired by the Motion Picture)
"Circus Maximus" (Travis Scott featuring the Weeknd and Swae Lee)	2023	36	19	17	49	32	—	— (Note: "Circus Maximus" did not enter the Swedish Singellista Chart, but peaked at number 10 on the Swedish Heatseeker Chart.)	—	—	MC: Gold	Utopia
"Mural" (with Jhené Aiko)	2026	—	—	—	—	—	— (Note: "Mural" did not enter the NZ Top 40 Singles Chart, but peaked at number 34 on the NZ Hot Singles Chart.)	—	—	—		Same Difference
"Take My Heart" (with Post Malone)	2026	—	—	—	—	—	— (Note: "Take My Heart" did not enter the NZ Top 40 Singles Chart, but peaked at number 18 on the NZ Hot Singles Chart.)	—	—	—		Same Difference
"—" denotes a recording that did not chart or was not released in that territory.

== Guest appearances ==
List of non-single guest appearances, with other performing artists, showing year released and album name
Title	Year	Other performer(s)	Album
"That Got Damn (Freestyle)"	2014	Mike Will Made-It, Jace, Andrea	Ransom
"Never See Me Again?"	2015	Two-9	B4FRVR
"Nightcrawler"	2015	Travis Scott, Chief Keef	Rodeo
"Party Bus"	2015	Murda Beatz, MadeinTYO, Royce Rizzy	none
"That's It"	2016	Sonny Digital	G.O.A.T.
"Ball Out the Lot"	2016	BoBo Swae	none
"Yacht Master"	2016	Murda Beatz, 2 Chainz	Keep God First
"BirdWatching"	2016	GenoDaBoss, Veli Sosa	none
"Bars of Soap"	2017	Mike Will Made-It	Ransom 2
"Poor Fool"	2017	2 Chainz	Pretty Girls Like Trap Music
"Don't Judge Me"	2017	Ty Dolla Sign, Future	Beach House 3
"Reason"	2017	Big Sean, Metro Boomin	Double or Nothing
"The Ways"	2018	Khalid	Black Panther: The Album
"Spoil My Night"	2018	Post Malone	Beerbongs & Bentleys
"Body High"	2018	Trey Songz	28
"Chanel"	2018	Rae Sremmurd, Pharrell Williams	SR3MM
"Gargoyle"	2018	Rich the Kid, Offset	The World Is Yours
"Try Me" (Remix)	2018	The Weeknd, Quavo, Trouble	none
"R.I.P. Screw"	2018	Travis Scott	Astroworld
"Dreamcatcher"	2018	Metro Boomin, Travis Scott	Not All Heroes Wear Capes
"Borrowed Love"	2018	Metro Boomin, Wizkid	Not All Heroes Wear Capes
"Chun Swae"	2018	Nicki Minaj	Queen
"Fate"	2018	Mike Will Made-It, Young Thug	Creed II: The Album
"Good Company"	2018	Tone Stith, Quavo	Good Company
"Poquito"	2019	Anitta	Kisses
"Party Up the Street"	2019	Miley Cyrus, Mike Will Made-It	She Is Coming
"Creature"	2020	Pop Smoke	Shoot for the Stars, Aim for the Moon
"TR666"	2020	Trippie Redd	Pegasus
"No Service"	2020	Tory Lanez	Loner
"Genius"	2021	Pop Smoke, Lil Tjay	Faith
"Caymans"	2022	2 Chainz	Dope Don't Sell Itself
"Log Out"	2022	T-Shyne, YSL Records, 6lack	Confetti Nights
"Annihilate"	2023	Metro Boomin, Lil Wayne, Offset	Spider-Man: Across the Spider-Verse (Soundtrack from and Inspired by the Motion Picture)
"Circus Maximus"	2023	Travis Scott, the Weeknd	Utopia
"Tough Love"	2023	Diddy	The Love Album: Off the Grid
"Special"	2024	Lyrical Lemonade, Aminé, Latto	All Is Yellow
"Could It Be"	2024	Fivio Foreign	Pain & Love 2
"Turn Yo Cap Back (Cap Backwards)"	2024	Nicki Minaj	The Pinkprint (Tenth Anniversary Edition)

== Production discography ==
List of songwriting and production credits (excluding guest appearances, interpolations, and samples)
Track(s)	Year	Credit	Artist(s)	Album
5. "No Type"	2014	Co-producer (with Mike Will Made It)	Rae Sremmurd	SremmLife
5. "Pussy Print"; (featuring Kanye West)	2016	Co-producer (with Marz and Mike Will Made It)	Gucci Mane	Everybody Looking
12. "Formation"	2016	Songwriter	Beyoncé	Lemonade

== Music videos ==
List of music videos, showing year released and directors
Year	Title	Director(s)	Artist(s)	Ref.
As featured performer
2015	"That Got Damn" (Freestyle)"	Max "Directed by Max" Hliva	Mike Will Made-It featuring Swae Lee, Jace and Andrea	
2015	"Drinks On Us"	Matt Swinsky	Mike Will Made-It featuring Swae Lee and Future	
2017	"Unforgettable"	Spiff TV & French Montana	French Montana featuring Swae Lee	
2017	"Ball Out the Lot"	Max "Directed by Max" Hliva	BoBo Swae featuring Swae Lee	
