= Guatemala (disambiguation) =

Guatemala is a country in Central America.

== Places ==
Guatemala may also refer to:

- Guatemala City, the capital of Guatemala
- Guatemala Department, a department of Guatemala
- Guatemala, Cuba, a village in the Holguín Province
- Captaincy General of Guatemala, was an administrative division of the Spanish Empire in Central America
- Guatemala, San Sebastián, Puerto Rico, a barrio

== Other ==
- Guatemala (song), single by hip hop artist Swae Lee
