= Nasty (Bandit Gang Marco song) =

Single by Bandit Gang Marco featuring Young Dro

from the album Nasty the Album
- Released: February 10, 2014
- Recorded: 2014
- Genre: Hip hop
- Length: 3:10
- Label: JSRC; Diamond Style Records
- Songwriters: Bandit Gang Marco; D'Juan Montrel Hart; Samuel Gloade
- Producer: 30 Roc

"Nasty" is a song by American rapper Bandit Gang Marco featuring fellow American rapper Young Dro. The song was released as the lead single from Marco's debut studio album, Nasty the Album.

== Release ==
The single was released on February 10, 2014. It was also sold on iTunes as part of Marco's debut studio album, Nasty The Album. The single was also uploaded to SoundCloud by a user named Future Trap.

== Music video ==
The music video for the song was released on YouTube on November 28, 2014, and has received over 3 million views.

== Remixes ==
The official remix features fellow American rappers Kevin Gates and Young Thug.

The best known remix of this song is "Nasty Freestyle" by fellow American rapper T-Wayne, which had a much better commercial performance than the original, selling over a million copies and peaking at number 9 on the Billboard Hot 100.

== Commercial performance ==
The song peaked at number 41 on the Billboard Hot 100. It also charted at #68 in Canada, making it Dro's first international single.

== Charts ==
Chart (2015)	Peak position
Canada (Canadian Hot 100)	68
US Billboard Hot 100	41
US Hot R&B/Hip-Hop Songs (Billboard)	12
