= Swang =

Swang may refer to:

- Saang, popular folk theatre form, from India
- Bhavai, variant of Swang theatre
- Swang (song), single by rap duo Rae Sremmurd
- "Swang", a song by the Human League from Crash (The Human League album)
