= Look Alive (Rae Sremmurd song) =

- Cover artwork for the official remix featuring Migos

Single by Rae Sremmurd

from the album SremmLife 2
- Released: April 14, 2016
- Recorded: 2016
- Genre: Hip hop; trap
- Length: 3:48
- Label: EarDrummers; Interscope
- Songwriters: Khalif Brown; Aaquil Brown; Michael Williams; Jiovanni Romano; Rashod Brown
- Producers: Louie Ji; Mike Will Made It; Shoddy

Rae Sremmurd singles chronology
"By Chance" (2016)	"Look Alive" (2016)	"Black Beatles" (2016)

Music video
- "Look Alive" on YouTube

"Look Alive" is a song by American hip hop duo Rae Sremmurd. It was released on April 14, 2016 by EarDrummers and Interscope Records, as the second single from their second studio album SremmLife 2. The song was produced by Mike Will Made It.

== Music video ==
The song's accompanying music video premiered on June 13, 2016 on Rae Sremmurd's YouTube account on Vevo.

== Remix ==
The official remix features additional verses by Migos.

== Charts ==
=== Weekly charts ===
Chart (2016)	Peak position
US Billboard Hot 100	72
US Hot R&B/Hip-Hop Songs (Billboard)	26

=== Year-end charts ===
Chart (2016)	Position
US Hot R&B/Hip-Hop Songs (Billboard)	88

== Certifications ==
Region	Certification	Certified units/sales
United States (RIAA)	2× Platinum	2,000,000^{‡}
^{‡} Sales+streaming figures based on certification alone.

== Release history ==
Region	Date	Format	Label	Ref.
United States	April 14, 2016	Digital download	EarDrummers; Interscope	

== Personnel ==
Credits adapted from SremmLife 2 booklet.

Song credits

- Writing – Aaquil Brown, Khalif Brown, Rashod Odom, Jiovanni Romano, Michael Williams II
- Production – Louie Ji, Mike Will Made It & Shod Beatz
- Recording – Randy Lanphear & Swae Lee at Tree Sound Studios in Atlanta, Georgia
- Audio mixing – Jaycen Joshua & Stephen Hybicki at Larrabee Sound Studios in North Hollywood, California
- Assistant mix engineering – Maddox Chhim & Dave Nakaji
- Mastering – Dave Kutch, The Mastering Palace, New York City
