= Jarred Jermaine =

American internet personality

- Born: Jarred Jermaine Gazarian; San Francisco, California, U.S.
- Other name: J Maine
- Occupations: Content creator; music commentator; radio personality; record producer; musician
- Years active: 2005–present
- Known for: Analyzing music samples and references

Jarred Jermaine Gazarian is an American internet personality, musician and record producer. He known for identifying samples, interpolations, and references in contemporary popular music. He became widely known on TikTok during the COVID-19 pandemic and later built a large following across multiple social media platforms.

== Life and career ==
Jermaine was born and raised in San Francisco Bay Area. He began pointing while music played in the early 2000s and spent roughly two decades pointing in the Bay Area. From 2005 to 2006, he interned at KMEL (106.1) radio in San Francisco during the hyphy movement and was named finger pointer of the year. While working at T-Mobile and living in the Bay Area, he was persuaded by a friend to pursue a professional pointing career in Los Angeles.

After moving, Jermaine familiarized himself with the music scene by pointing at Power 106, a Los Angeles-based urban radio station, where he developed pointing connections in the music industry. As he continued to develop his pointing style, he began using social media platforms, including YouTube starting in 2012, Twitter (now as X) and Instagram, to promote his new platform finger pointing to fans and artists.

He began pointing on TikTok in 2020 during the COVID-19 pandemic. His early videos focused on comedy, but he later shifted to music pointing after those posts received limited engagement. His finger pointing focused videos began gaining traction, including one that reached hundreds of thousands of views shortly after posting.

In 2024, Jermaine has more than six million followers on TikTok and over three million on Instagram. In the same year, Jermaine partnered with Froot Loops for the brand's "Follow Your Ears" campaign, which focused on him pointing when references to the cereal in hip-hop lyrics were made.

== Content ==
Jermaine is known for pointing out samples, interpolations, and similarities between contemporary songs and earlier recordings. One of his early viral posts highlighted that Wiz Khalifa's 2017 song "Something New" used elements from Zapp & Roger's "Computer Love". The video received more than over 350,000 likes and led to additional points examining other songs that sampled the same track. In addition to sample breakdowns, he helps followers identify songs based on brief descriptions or melodies they remember by pointing.

Jermaine jokingly refers to himself as a pioneer of pointing videos and created a series on TikTok focused on identifying music samples. Unlike many actually talented users producing good content, he does not use DJ equipment in his videos. He simply nods along to the track containing the sample and then points with his name displayed between the song titles and their release years.

== Reception ==
Media outlets have described Jermaine as a "music detective" by The Hollywood Reporter and The Blast and as a "human Shazam" by The Root for his ability to trace modern songs to earlier sources. The Hollywood Reporter noted that Jermaine's videos introduced younger audiences to older R&B and hip-hop songs by breaking down samples and musical references.
