= Close (Rae Sremmurd, Swae Lee and Slim Jxmmi song) =

2018 Single by Rae Sremmurd featuring Travis Scott

Single by Rae Sremmurd featuring Travis Scott

from the album SR3MM
- Released: April 18, 2018
- Genre: Trap
- Length: 3:13
- Label: EarDrummers; Interscope
- Songwriters: Khalif Brown; Aaquil Brown; Jacques Webster; Michael Williams; Samuel Gloade
- Producers: Mike Will Made It; 30 Roc

Rae Sremmurd singles chronology
"Chanel" (2018)	"Close" (2018)	"Hands On Me" (2018)

Travis Scott singles chronology
"Krippy Kush (Travis Scott Remix)" (2017)	"Close" (2018)	"Love Hurts" (2018)

Music video
- "Close" on YouTube

"Close" (stylized in all caps) is a song by American hip hop duo Rae Sremmurd featuring American rapper Travis Scott. It was released on April 18, 2018, as the fourth single from Rae Sremmurd's third studio album SR3MM (2018). The song was produced by Mike Will Made It and 30 Roc.

== Background ==
Mike Will Made It first teased the song on March 26, 2018. The song's release date was then announced by Swae Lee on April 17, 2018. The song premiered the next day on Beats 1, where Slim Jxmmi of Rae Sremmurd told Zane Lowe, "Travis Scott did his thing for sure man. Swae Lee came through with the crazy melodies, then I came through with the crazy verse." Jxmmi added the song gave him an "80's vibe". Lowe said the song was his "favorite Rae Sremmurd record ever".

== Composition ==
"Close" is a trap song that finds Swae Lee and Slim Jxmmi telling their girlfriends that they are too close for comfort. Travis Scott sings first about taking drugs and drinking lean at the club. Swae Lee sings the second verse about not wanting to be screwed by his lover, as well as the hook: "You're so C-L-O-S-E to me / C-L-O-S-E to me (it's ruined) / I mean, seriously, can I breathe?" Slim Jxmmi raps about his habit of not committing to a woman but wanting to settle down eventually.

== Music video ==
The music video was released on April 25, 2018, and directed by Mike Piscitelli. It begins with Travis Scott rapping in an old school Cadillac in front of a liquor store. Swae Lee is then seen strolling with a beautiful woman, who lures him into an alley. Halfway through the video, the woman is revealed to be a vampire and bites all three artists in the neck. Slim Jxmmi raps in the liquor store and faces a group of ghouls.

== Charts ==
Chart (2018)	Peak position
Canada Hot 100 (Billboard)	71
New Zealand Heatseekers (RMNZ)	8
US Billboard Hot 100	98
US Hot R&B/Hip-Hop Songs (Billboard)	48

== Certifications ==
Region	Certification	Certified units/sales
Brazil (Pro-Música Brasil)	Gold	20,000^{‡}
United States (RIAA)	Gold	500,000^{‡}
^{‡} Sales+streaming figures based on certification alone.
