= Powerglide (disambiguation) =

Powerglide is an automatic transmission tradename.

Powerglide may also refer to:

- Powerglide (Transformers), a fictional character
- Powerglide (album), a 1972 album by the New Riders of the Purple Sage
- "Powerglide" (song), a 2018 song by Rae Sremmurd featuring Juicy J from the album SR3MM
