= T'd Up =

Single by Rae Sremmurd

from the album SR3MM
- Released: February 5, 2018
- Recorded: 2017
- Genre: Hip hop; trap
- Length: 3:52
- Label: EarDrummers; Interscope
- Songwriters: Khalif Brown; Aaquil Brown; Leland Wayne; Darrel Jackson
- Producers: Metro Boomin; Chopsquad DJ; Swae Lee

Rae Sremmurd singles chronology
| "Sativa (Remix)" (2018) | "T'd Up" (2018) | "Powerglide" (2018) |

"T'd Up" (shortened for "Timed Up") is a single by American hip hop duo Rae Sremmurd. It was released on February 5, 2018, by EarDrummers and Interscope Records as the second single from their third studio album SR3MM (2018). It was written by duo members Slim Jxmmi and Swae Lee alongside Metro Boomin and ChopSquad DJ, being produced by the latter three.

== Background ==
The song was announced by Mike Will Made It via Twitter the day before release, while revealing the song's producers. "T'd Up" followed the announcement of Rae Sremmurd's third album SR3MM, originally titled SremmLife 3. The album is a triple-disc album featuring SR3MM and solo albums from Rae Sremmurd members Swae Lee, titled Swaecation, and Slim Jxmmi, titled Jxmtro.

== Live performances ==
The day before release, "T'd Up" was performed by Rae Sremmurd at Super Bowl LIVE in Minneapolis, in preparation for Super Bowl LII.

== Personnel ==
Credits adapted from Tidal.

- Khalif "Swae Lee" Brown – production, songwriting
- Aaquil "Slim Jxmmi" Brown – songwriting
- Leland "Metro Boomin" Wayne – production, songwriting
- Darrel Jackson – production
- Jaycen Joshua – mixing

== Charts ==
| Chart (2018) | Peak position |
|---|---|
| US Bubbling Under Hot 100 (Billboard) | 23 |
| US Bubbling Under R&B/Hip-Hop Singles (Billboard) | 8 |

== Release history ==
| Region | Date | Format | Label | Ref. |
|---|---|---|---|---|
| United States | February 5, 2018 | Digital download | EarDrummers; Interscope | |
