= Rolling Papers 2 =

2018 album by Wiz Khalifa

Studio album by Wiz Khalifa
- Released: July 13, 2018
- Recorded: 2016–2018
- Genre: Trap
- Length: 89:52
- Labels: Taylor Gang; Atlantic
- Producers: 1Mind; 30 Roc; A1; Anthony Horvath; Ayo; Bobby Raps; Cardo; CBMix; Chris Dreamer; Cubeatz; Dave Sava6e; DJ Khalil; Easy Mo Bee; EZ Elpee; Frank Dukes; Hitmaka; ID Labs; Javar Rockamore; Keyz; Mike Will Made It; Nostxlgic; NSFR; Outtatown; Pvlace; Rockamore; Sledgren; Tay Keith; Terrace Martin; TM88; Twon Beatz; Young Chop; Yung Exclusive

Wiz Khalifa chronology
Laugh Now, Fly Later (2017)	Rolling Papers 2 (2018)	2009 (2019)

Singles from Rolling Papers 2
- 1. "Something New" Released: August 11, 2017; 2. "Real Rich" Released: May 4, 2018; 3. "Hopeless Romantic" Released: June 22, 2018; 4. "Gin & Drugs" Released: June 29, 2018; 5. "Fr Fr" Released: September 18, 2018

Rolling Papers 2 (sometimes stylized as Rolling Papers II) is the sixth studio album by American rapper Wiz Khalifa. It was released on July 13, 2018, by Taylor Gang Entertainment and Atlantic Records, and is the sequel to his major-label debut Rolling Papers (2011). The album features guest appearances by Gucci Mane, Swae Lee, Ty Dolla Sign, PartyNextDoor, Bone Thugs-n-Harmony and Snoop Dogg, among others. It also features appearances from R&B duo THEMXXNLIGHT, as well as Jimmy Wopo, who is credited posthumously following his death on June 18, 2018, less than a month before the album's release. The production is handled by Cardo, Mike Will Made It, Tay Keith, and Young Chop, among others.

It was supported by the singles "Something New", "Real Rich", "Hopeless Romantic" and "Gin & Drugs". "Something New" and "Hopeless Romantic" were both modest hits, eventually being certified platinum by the RIAA. The album debuted at number 2 on the Billboard 200.

== Background ==
In an episode of Genius' For the Record, Wiz Khalifa sat down with hip-hop journalist Rob Markman to speak on the album, stating,

"With Rolling Papers 2, it's like I'm at a whole new point in my career where people may or may not know what to expect. I feel like this is such an opportunity to just come out to the world. It feels so important, it feels as important as the first time. So that's why I said Rolling Papers 2."

== Reception ==
Professional ratings
Aggregate scores
Source	Rating
Metacritic	56/100
Review scores
Source	Rating
The 405	5.5/10
AllMusic	2.5/5 stars
HotNewHipHop	71%
MusicOMH	2/5 stars
Pitchfork	4.2/10
XXL	4/5

Rolling Papers 2 was met with generally mixed reviews from critics. At Metacritic, which assigns a normalized rating out of 100 from mainstream publications, the album received an average score of 56, based on 6 reviews.

== Commercial performance ==
In the United States, Rolling Papers 2 debuted at number two on the Billboard 200 based on 84.2 million streams of its songs and 14,000 pure album sales, which Billboard equated to 80,000 album-equivalent units. It is Khalifa's fifth top-ten album in the United States. The album earned 33,000 album-equivalent units in the second week. In Canada, the album debuted at number four on the Canadian Albums Chart. It serves as Khalifa's third non-consecutive top-ten album in the country.

In 2018, Rolling Papers 2 was ranked as the 128th most popular album of the year on the Billboard 200. The album was certified Gold by the RIAA 11 months after its release.

== Track listing ==
No.	Title	Writer(s)	Producer(s)	Length
1.	"Hot Now"	Cameron Thomaz; Bryan Simmons; Robert Richardson	TM88; Bobby Raps	3:46
2.	"Ocean"	Thomaz; Ronald LaTour; Edward Murray	Cardo; Sledgren	3:31
3.	"Blue Hunnids" (featuring Jimmy Wopo and Hardo)	Thomaz; Travon Smart; Joseph Barnett; Murray	Sledgren	4:06
4.	"Very Special"	Thomaz; Simmons; Javar Rockamore	TM88; Rockamore	2:46
5.	"Goin Hard"	Thomaz; Simmons	TM88	2:08
6.	"Holyfield"	Thomaz; Simmons; Tobias Dekker	TM88; Outtatown	2:33
7.	"Rolling Papers 2"	Thomaz; Eric Dan; Jeremy Kulousek; Adam Feeney	ID Labs; Frank Dukes	4:22
8.	"Mr. Williams / Where Is the Love" (featuring THEMXXNLIGHT and Currensy)	Thomaz; Akash Chandani; Krish Chandani; Shante Franklin; Simmons; Murray	Sledgren ("Mr. Williams"); TM88 ("Where Is the Love")	6:39
9.	"Penthouse" (featuring Snoop Dogg)	Thomaz; Calvin Broadus, Jr.; Kenneth Wright	NSFR	3:20
10.	"Real Rich" (featuring Gucci Mane)	Thomaz; Radric Davis; Brytavious Chambers	Tay Keith	2:04
11.	"Bootsy Bellows"	Thomaz; Murray	Sledgren	3:24
12.	"Hopeless Romantic" (featuring Swae Lee)	Thomaz; Khalif Brown; Tyree Pittman; Christopher Barnett	Young Chop; CBMix	3:46
13.	"Late Night Messages"	Thomaz; Dan; Kulousek	ID Labs	4:42
14.	"Rain" (featuring PARTYNEXTDOOR)	Thomaz; Jahron Brathwaite; LaTour; Daveon Jackson; Murray	Cardo; Sledgren; Yung Exclusive	2:33
15.	"Karate / Never Hesitate" (featuring Chevy Woods and Darrius Willrich)	Thomaz; Kevin Woods; Simmons; Kevin Gomringer; Tim Gomringer; Terrace Martin; Jacob Dutton; Darrius Willrich	TM88; Cubeatz ("Karate"); Terrace Martin; Jake One; Willrich ("Never Hesitate")	5:30
16.	"Fr Fr" (featuring Lil Skies)	Thomaz; Kimetrius Foose; Dan; Kulousek; Zachary Vaughan; Tyler Mason	ID Labs; Nostxlgic	3:15
17.	"King"	Thomaz; Dan; Kulousek; Vaughan; Mason	ID Labs; Nostxlgic	3:27
18.	"Gin and Drugs" (featuring Problem)	Thomaz; Jason Martin, Jr.; Osten Harvey, Jr.	Easy Mo Bee	2:34
19.	"420 Freestyle"	Thomaz; Samuel Gloade; Michael Williams II; Antwon Hicks; Lamont Porter	30 Roc; Mike Will Made It; Twon Beatz; EZ Elpee	3:37
20.	"B Ok"	Thomaz; Khalil Abdul-Rahman; Dan; Kulousek; Sam Barsh; Daniel Seeff	DJ Khalil; ID Labs	4:42
21.	"It's on You"	Thomaz; Dave Savage	Dave Sava6e	2:32
22.	"Reach for the Stars" (featuring Bone Thugs-n-Harmony)	Thomaz; Anthony Henderson; Steven Howse; Stanley Howse; Bryon McCane II; Charles Scruggs, Jr.; Michael Lohmeier; McCulloch Sutphin; Dan; Kulousek	1Mind; ID Labs	4:19
23.	"All of a Sudden" (featuring THEMXXNLIGHT)	Thomaz; A. Chandani; K. Chandani; Chris Monroe; Murray	Chris Dreamer; Sledgren	3:38
24.	"Homework" (featuring THEMXXNLIGHT)	Thomaz; A. Chandani; K. Chandani; Denis Berger; Murray	Pvlace; Sledgren	3:04
25.	"Something New" (featuring Ty Dolla Sign)	Thomaz; Tyrone Griffin, Jr.; Christian Ward; Austin Owens; James Foye III; Floyd "A1" Bentley	Hitmaka; Ayo; Keyz; A1	3:20
Total length:				89:52

Rolling Papers II Japan Version
No.	Title	Writer(s)	Producer(s)	Length
1.	"Rolling Papers 2"	Thomaz; Eric Dan; Jeremy Kulousek; Adam Feeney	ID Labs; Frank Dukes	4:22
2.	"Penthouse" (featuring Snoop Dogg)	Thomaz; Calvin Broadus, Jr.; Kenneth Wright	NSFR	3:20
3.	"Real Rich" (featuring Gucci Mane)	Thomaz; Radric Davis; Brytavious Chambers	Tay Keith	2:04
4.	"Hopeless Romantic" (featuring Swae Lee)	Thomaz; Khalif Brown; Tyree Pittman; Christopher Barnett	Young Chop; CBMix	3:46
5.	"Rain" (featuring PARTYNEXTDOOR)	Thomaz; Jahron Brathwaite; LaTour; Daveon Jackson; Murray	Cardo; Sledgren; Yung Exclusive	2:33
6.	"Karate / Never Hesitate" (featuring Chevy Woods and Darrius Willrich)	Thomaz; Kevin Woods; Simmons; Kevin Gomringer; Tim Gomringer; Terrace Martin; Jacob Dutton; Darrius Willrich	TM88; Cubeatz ("Karate"); Terrace Martin; Jake One; Willrich ("Never Hesitate")	5:30
7.	"Fr Fr" (featuring Lil Skies)	Thomaz; Kimetrius Foose; Dan; Kulousek; Zachary Vaughan; Tyler Mason	ID Labs; Nostxlgic	3:15
8.	"Gin and Drugs" (featuring Problem)	Thomaz; Jason Martin, Jr.; Osten Harvey, Jr.	Easy Mo Bee	2:34
9.	"Reach for the Stars" (featuring Bone Thugs-n-Harmony)	Thomaz; Anthony Henderson; Steven Howse; Stanley Howse; Bryon McCane II; Charles Scruggs, Jr.; Michael Lohmeier; McCulloch Sutphin; Dan; Kulousek	1Mind; ID Labs	4:19
10.	"All of a Sudden" (featuring THEMXXNLIGHT)	Thomaz; A. Chandani; K. Chandani; Chris Monroe; Murray	Chris Dreamer; Sledgren	3:38
11.	"Homework" (featuring THEMXXNLIGHT)	Thomaz; A. Chandani; K. Chandani; Denis Berger; Murray	Pvlace; Sledgren	3:04
12.	"Something New" (featuring Ty Dolla Sign)	Thomaz; Tyrone Griffin, Jr.; Christian Ward; Austin Owens; James Foye III; Floyd "A1" Bentley	Hitmaka; Ayo; Keyz; A1	3:20
13.	"Young, Wild & Free" (with Snoop Dogg featuring Bruno Mars)	Broadus, Thomaz, Peter Hernandez, Philip Lawrence, Ari Levine, Christopher Brown, Ted Bluechel, Marlon Borrow, Tyrone Griffin, Keenon Jackson, Nye Lee, Marquise Newman	The Smeezingtons	3:27

== Charts ==
=== Weekly charts ===
Chart (2018)	Peak position
Australian Albums (ARIA)	55
Austrian Albums (Ö3 Austria)	58
Belgian Albums (Ultratop Flanders)	57
Belgian Albums (Ultratop Wallonia)	80
Canadian Albums (Billboard)	4
Czech Albums (ČNS IFPI)	92
Danish Albums (Hitlisten)	23
Dutch Albums (Album Top 100)	23
Finnish Albums (Suomen virallinen lista)	32
German Albums (Offizielle Top 100)	46
Italian Albums (FIMI)	75
Norwegian Albums (VG-lista)	12
Slovak Albums (ČNS IFPI)	56
Swiss Albums (Schweizer Hitparade)	20
UK Albums (Official Charts)	62
UK R&B Albums (Official Charts)	21
US Billboard 200	2
US Top R&B/Hip-Hop Albums (Billboard)	2

=== Year-end charts ===
Chart (2018)	Position
US Billboard 200	128
US Top R&B/Hip-Hop Albums (Billboard)	52

== Certifications ==
Region	Certification	Certified units/sales
United States (RIAA)	Platinum	1,000,000^{‡}
^{‡} Sales+streaming figures based on certification alone.
