= SremmLife 2 =

Studio album by Rae Sremmurd
- Released: August 12, 2016
- Studio: Chalice (Los Angeles); D-Brady (Memphis); Ear Drumma; Gucci's Home Studio; Hit Factory Criteria (Miami); PatchWerk; Sauce; Tree Sound (Atlanta)
- Genre: Hip-hop
- Length: 43:15
- Label: Ear Drummer; Interscope
- Producer: 30 Roc; Crowd+CTRL; DJ Mustard; HighDefRazjah; Louie Ji; Marz; The Martianz; Mike Will Made It; P-Nazty; Pluss; Resource; Scooly; Sparxxx Pro; Whatlilshoddysay

Rae Sremmurd chronology
SremmLife (2015)	SremmLife 2 (2016)	SR3MM (2018)

Singles from SremmLife 2
- 1. "By Chance" Released: February 13, 2016; 2. "Look Alive" Released: April 14, 2016; 3. "Black Beatles" Released: September 13, 2016; 4. "Swang" Released: January 24, 2017

SremmLife 2 (sometimes stylized as SremmLife II) is the second studio album by American hip-hop duo Rae Sremmurd. It was released on August 12, 2016, by Ear Drummer Records and Interscope Records. The album serves as a sequel to their previous studio effort, SremmLife (2015). It features guest appearances from Kodak Black, Gucci Mane, Juicy J, Lil Jon and Bobo Swae.

SremmLife 2 was supported by four singles: "By Chance", "Look Alive", "Black Beatles" and "Swang". The album debuted at number seven on the US Billboard 200 and later reached number four. It received generally positive reviews from critics.

== Promotion ==
The album's lead single, "By Chance", was released on February 13, 2016, the song peaked at number 39 on the US Hot R&B/Hip-Hop Songs. The album's second single, "Look Alive", was released on April 14, 2016, the song peaked at number 72 on the US Billboard Hot 100.

"Black Beatles" featuring Gucci Mane, was sent to urban contemporary radio on September 13, 2016, as the album's third single. On September 22, 2016, the music video for "Black Beatles" was released on Rae Sremmurd's Vevo account on YouTube. The song peaked at number one on the Billboard Hot 100.

"Swang" was sent to urban contemporary radio on January 24, 2017, as the album's fourth single, the song peaked at number 26 on the Billboard Hot 100.

=== Other songs ===
The album's first promotional single, "Over Here", was released on March 23, 2016, the song was released as an interactive music video powered by Doritos. "Set the Roof" featuring Lil Jon, was released on August 7, 2016, as the album's second promotional single.

== Critical reception ==
Professional ratings
Aggregate scores
Source	Rating
AnyDecentMusic?	7.1/10
Metacritic	75/100
Review scores
Source	Rating
AllMusic	3.5/5 stars
Consequence	B
Exclaim!	8/10
HipHopDX	3.9/5
HotNewHipHop	80%
The Line of Best Fit	7.5/10
Pitchfork	7.6/10
Rolling Stone	3/5 stars
Spin	7/10
XXL	3/5

SremmLife 2 was met with generally positive reviews. At Metacritic, which assigns a normalized rating out of 100 to reviews from professional publications, the album received an average score of 75, based on 13 reviews. Aggregator AnyDecentMusic? gave it 7.1 out of 10, based on their assessment of the critical consensus.

Exclaim!'s Calum Slingerland gave the album a positive review, calling it "a rarely relenting party with more substance than the last". Narsimha Chintaluri of HipHopDX gave the album a positive review stating, "SremmLife 2 is worthwhile (and much needed) bid for album of the summer. It's top heavy, "By Chance", "Look Alive", and "Black Beatles" feeling a lot like one of the best three song stretches of the year, but Swae brings a promising sense of experimentation to the entire project". Sheldon Pearce of Pitchfork wrote: "SremmLife 2 collects all of the quirks in the margins of its predecessor and develops them; more than anything else, SremmLife 2 is the ultimate middle finger to grouches who think this brand of rap can't be complex." Grant Rindner of The Line of Best Fit commented: "There are real signs of musical development on Sremmurd 2 that point to longevity for the duo." David Sackllah of Consequence said, "SremmLife 2 may not pack the punch of its predecessor, but it shows that the brothers are growing musically. Far from one-note, Rae Sremmurd have the chops to sustain a long and varied run going forward". David Jeffries of AllMusic stated that "Hotter singles make their debut a better buy, but for a group pegged as a one-hit wonder early on, SremmLife 2 dispels that myth with style".

In more mixed reviews, XXL's Scott Gleysher stated: "SremmLife 2 is by no means a sophomore slump but just doesn't quite fill the same space as the first installment did last year." Lukas Maeder of Rolling Stone commented: "Stretching beyond SremmLife, their party-starting choruses are squeaked, squawked and shouted; mellower stuff can get a Makonnen-esque broken falsetto ("Swang"); "By Chance" succeeds with a haughty Dana Dane accent."

=== Year-end lists ===
Select year-end rankings of SremmLife 2
Publication	List	Rank	Ref.
Billboard	Best Albums of 2016	50	
Complex	The 50 Best Albums of 2016	30	
Thrillist	The 30 Best Albums of 2016	21	

== Commercial performance ==
SremmLife 2 debuted at number seven on the US Billboard 200, with 30,000 album-equivalent units with 15,000 pure album sales in its first week. The album later reached a new peak at number four on the chart on the issue dated November 26, 2016, due to the success of "Black Beatles". On April 24, 2024, SremmLife 2 was certified double platinum by the Recording Industry Association of America (RIAA) with two million album-equivalent units in the United States.

== Track listing ==
SremmLife 2 track listing
No.	Title	Writer(s)	Producer(s)	Length
1.	"Start a Party"	Aaquil Brown; Khalif Brown; Asheton Hogan; Pierre Slaughter	Pluss; P-Nazty^{[a]}	3:35
2.	"Real Chill" (featuring Kodak Black)	A. Brown; K. Brown; Dieuson Octave; Samuel Gloade; Michael Williams	30 Roc; Mike Will Made It	4:27
3.	"By Chance"	Braylin Bowman; A. Brown; K. Brown; Williams	Mike Will Made It; Resource^{[a]}	3:43
4.	"Look Alive"	A. Brown; K. Brown; Rashod Brown; Jiovanni Romano; Williams	Louie Ji; Mike Will Made It; Whatlilshoddysay	3:48
5.	"Black Beatles" (featuring Gucci Mane)	A. Brown; K. Brown; Radric Davis; Williams	Mike Will Made It	4:51
6.	"Shake It Fast" (featuring Juicy J)	A. Brown; K. Brown; Jordan Houston; Stephen Hybicki; Tariq Sharrieff; Bryce Smith; Williams	Crowd+CTRL; Mike Will Made It	4:03
7.	"Set the Roof" (featuring Lil Jon)	A. Brown; K. Brown; Jonathan Smith; Dijon McFarlane; Lonnie Simmons; Rudolph Taylor; Williams; Charlie Wilson; Robert Wilson; Ronnie Wilson	DJ Mustard; Mike Will Made It	3:25
8.	"Came a Long Way"	A. Brown; K. Brown; Jordan Hutchins; Adrian McKinnon	The Martianz	4:00
9.	"Now That I Know"	A. Brown; K. Brown; Marcus Bell; Kenny Sparks; Williams	Mike Will Made It; Scooly; Sparxxx Pro^{[a]}	4:04
10.	"Take It or Leave It"	A. Brown; K. Brown; Vaquan Wilkins; Williams	HighDefRazjah; Mike Will Made It	3:31
11.	"Do Yoga"	Bowman; A. Brown; K. Brown; Fowler; Williams	Mike Will Made It; Resource; Scooly	3:58
Total length:				43:24

Deluxe edition
No.	Title	Writer(s)	Producer(s)	Length
12.	"Over Here" (featuring Bobo Swae)	A. Brown; K. Brown; Marquel Middlebrooks; Slaughter; Williams	Marz; Mike Will Made It; P-Nazty	4:42
13.	"Swang"	A. Brown; K. Brown; Slaughter	P-Nazty	3:28
14.	"Just Like Us"	A. Brown; K. Brown; Hogan; Williams	Mike Will Made It; Pluss	4:06
Total length:				55:40

Target edition
No.	Title	Writer(s)	Producer(s)	Length
15.	"Patti Cake"	A. Brown; K. Brown; Middlebrooks; Slaughter	Marz; P-Nazty	3:51
16.	"Pole Code"	A. Brown; K. Brown; Middlebrooks	Marz	3:31
Total length:				1:04:00

Notes

- ^{^[a]} signifies a co-producer

Sample credits

- "Shake It Fast" contains interpolations from "Slob on My Knob", performed by Three 6 Mafia.
- "Set the Roof" contains interpolations from the composition "I Don't Believe You Want To Get Up And Dance (Oops)", written by Lonnie Simmons, Charlie Wilson, Robert Wilson, Ronnie Wilson and Rudolph Taylor, and performed by The Gap Band.

== Personnel ==
Credits adapted from the album's liner notes.

Performance

- Rae Sremmurd – primary artists
- Radric "Gucci Mane" Davis – featured artist (track 5)
- Jordan "Juicy J" Houston – featured artist (track 6)
- Dieuson "Kodak Black" Octave – featured artist (track 2)
- Jonathan "Lil Jon" Smith – featured artist (track 7)

Production

- Michael "Mike Will Made It" Williams II – executive producer, producer (tracks 2, 3, 4, 5, 6, 7, 9, 10, 11, 12, 13, 14)
- Rae Sremmurd – executive producers
- Marc "Scooly" Bell – producer (tracks 9, 11)
- Braylin "Resource" Bowman – producer (track 11), co-producer (track 3)
- Samuel "30 Roc" Gloade – producer (track 2)
- Stephen "The Sauce" Hybicki – producer as part of Crowd+CTRL (track 6)
- Asheton "Pluss" Hogan – producer (track 1, 14)
- Jordan "The Martianz" Hutchins – producer (track 8)
- Dijon "DJ Mustard" McFarlane – producer (track 7)
- Adrian Jamal McKinnon – co-producer (track 8)
- Marquel "Marz" Middlebrooks – producer (tracks 12, 15, 16)
- Rashod "Shoddy" Brown – producer (track 4)
- Jiovanni "Louie Ji" Romano – producer (track 4)
- Pierre "P-Nazty" Slaughter – producer (tracks 12, 13, 15), co-producer (track 1)
- Tariq "BLSSD" Sharrieff – co-producer as part of Crowd+CTRL (track 6)
- Bryce "Radio Luv" Smith – co-producer as part of Crowd+CTRL (track 6)
- Kenny "Sparxxx Pro" Sparks – co-producer (track 9)
- Vaquan "HighDefRazjah" Wilkins – producer (track 10)

Technical

- Jasiah "SpydasMix" Antney – mixing (track 8), mixing assistant (tracks 1, 15, 16)
- Khalif "Swae Lee" Brown – engineer (tracks 3, 4, 5, 6, 8, 9, 10, 11, 13, 14)
- Maddox Chhim – mixing assistant (tracks 4, 6, 7, 9, 10, 14)
- Thomas Cullison – engineer (track 7)
- Farreed – engineer (track 2)
- Michael "Crazy Mike" Foster – engineer (track 6)
- Stephen "The Sauce" Hybicki – engineer (track 7), mixing (tracks 3, 4, 5, 9, 10, 11, 12, 14, 15, 16), mixing assistant (track 1)
- Jermarcus "Jay Sremm" Jackson – engineer (track 2)
- Jaycen Joshua – mixing (tracks 4, 6, 7, 9, 10, 14)
- Dave Kutch – mastering (all tracks)
- Randy Lanphear – engineer (tracks 2, 3, 4, 5, 6, 8, 9, 10, 11, 13, 14), mixing (track 1), mixing assistant (tracks 3, 12, 15, 16)
- Dave Nakaji – mixing assistant (tracks 4, 6, 7, 9, 10, 14)
- Sean Payne – engineer (track 5)
- Pierre "P-Nazty" Slaughter – engineer (tracks 1, 12, 15, 16)
- Scott Taylor Jr. – engineer (track 10)
- Finis "KY" White – mixing (tracks 2, 8, 13)

Miscellaneous

- Irwan Awalludin – art and design
- Juliot Badit – cover and photography
- Max "Directed by Max" Hliva – videography
- Gunner Stahl – photography
- Bryan "Bwrightous" Wright – creative director

== Charts ==
=== Weekly charts ===
Chart performance for SremmLife 2
Chart (2016–2017)	Peak position
Australian Albums (ARIA)	83
Belgian Albums (Ultratop Flanders)	82
Belgian Albums (Ultratop Wallonia)	136
Canadian Albums (Billboard)	13
Danish Albums (Hitlisten)	7
Dutch Albums (Album Top 100)	78
Finnish Albums (Suomen virallinen lista)	31
French Albums (SNEP)	92
New Zealand Heatseekers Albums (RMNZ)	3
Norwegian Albums (VG-lista)	31
Swedish Albums (Sverigetopplistan)	55
Swiss Albums (Schweizer Hitparade)	32
US Billboard 200	4
US Top R&B/Hip-Hop Albums (Billboard)	3

=== Year-end charts ===
2016 year-end chart performance for SremmLife 2
Chart (2016)	Position
US Billboard 200	151
US Top R&B/Hip-Hop Albums (Billboard)	68

2017 year-end chart performance for SremmLife 2
Chart (2017)	Position
Danish Albums (Hitlisten)	68
Icelandic Albums (Plötutíóindi)	44
US Billboard 200	29
US Top R&B/Hip-Hop Albums (Billboard)	32

== Certifications ==
Certifications for SremmLife 2
Region	Certification	Certified units/sales
Denmark (IFPI Danmark)	Gold	10,000^{‡}
France (SNEP)	Gold	50,000^{‡}
New Zealand (RMNZ)	Platinum	15,000^{‡}
Poland (ZPAV)	Gold	10,000^{‡}
United States (RIAA)	2× Platinum	2,000,000^{‡}
^{‡} Sales+streaming figures based on certification alone.
