= Powerglide (song) =

Single by Rae Sremmurd featuring Juicy J

from the album SR3MM
- Released: February 16, 2018 (solo version); March 1, 2018
- Recorded: 2017
- Genre: Hip-hop; trap
- Length: 5:35; 3:34 (solo version)
- Label: EarDrummers; Interscope
- Songwriters: Khalif Brown; Aaquil Brown; Jordan Houston; Jamal Rashid; Jean-Marie Horvat; Michael Williams
- Producers: Horvat; Mike Will Made It

Rae Sremmurd singles chronology
"T'd Up" (2018)	"Powerglide" (2018)	"Chanel" (2018)

Juicy J singles chronology
"Kama Sutra" (2017)	"Powerglide" (2018)	"You Can Cry" (2018)

Music video
- "Powerglide" on YouTube

"Powerglide" is a single by American hip hop duo Rae Sremmurd. It was released on March 1, 2018 by EarDrummers and Interscope Records as the third single from their third studio album SR3MM (2018). The song is written by the artists alongside producers Mally Mall, Jean-Marie Horvat, and Mike Will Made It. The song features guest vocals from American rapper Juicy J (although he is notably cut from the radio edit).

== Background ==
The song was released alongside two other singles from SR3MM, Swae Lee's "Hurt to Look" and Slim Jxmmi's "Brxnks Truck", on March 1, 2018. The album is a triple-disc album featuring SR3MM and solo albums from Rae Sremmurd members Swae Lee, titled Swaecation, and Slim Jxmmi, titled Jxmtro. The song samples Three 6 Mafia's "Side 2 Side", featuring Mafia member Juicy J. They were able to get Juicy J involved after a run-in at a party. Juicy expressed an interest in collaboration and went to the studio. He sent his part back, and as Swae says, "wrecked it."

== Music video ==
A music video for "Powerglide" was released on March 12, 2018. In the visual, the rappers perform the track up on a parking structure rooftop as cars burn rubber, do donuts and get "lit up" by overhead helicopters. Producer Mike Will Made It makes a cameo appearance in the video.

== Personnel ==
Credits adapted from Tidal.

- Khalif Brown – composition
- Aaquil Brown – composition
- Jordan Houston – composition
- Jamal Rashid – composition, production
- Jean-Marie Horvat – composition, production
- Michael Williams – composition, production, mixing
- Jaycen Joshua – mixing

== Charts ==
=== Weekly charts ===
Chart (2018)	Peak position
Australia (ARIA)	74
Canada Hot 100 (Billboard)	33
New Zealand Heatseeker (RMNZ)	8
US Billboard Hot 100	28
US Hot R&B/Hip-Hop Songs (Billboard)	17
US Rhythmic Airplay (Billboard)	12

=== Year-end charts ===
Chart (2018)	Position
Canada (Canadian Hot 100)	83
US Billboard Hot 100	97
US Hot R&B/Hip-Hop Songs (Billboard)	51
US Rhythmic (Billboard)	49

== Certifications ==
Region	Certification	Certified units/sales
Australia (ARIA)	Gold	35,000^{‡}
Brazil (Pro-Música Brasil)	Platinum	40,000^{‡}
Canada (Music Canada)	Platinum	80,000^{‡}
New Zealand (RMNZ)	Platinum	30,000^{‡}
United States (RIAA)	3× Platinum	3,000,000^{‡}
^{‡} Sales+streaming figures based on certification alone.
