= Stargazing (Travis Scott song) =

Promotional single by Travis Scott

from the album Astroworld
- Released: August 3, 2018
- Genre: Hip-hop; trap; psychedelic
- Length: 4:30
- Label: Cactus Jack; Epic; Grand Hustle
- Songwriters: Jacques Webster II; Sonny Uwaezuoke; Brandon Korn; Brandon Whitfield; Samuel Gloade; Cydel Young; Jamie Lepe; Mike Dean; LaMont Porter
- Producers: Sonny Digital; B Wheezy; B Korn; 30 Roc

Audio sample
- file; help

Music video
- "Astroworld Trailer (Stargazing)" on YouTube

"Stargazing" (stylized in all caps) is a song by American rapper and singer Travis Scott. It was released on August 3, 2018, as the only promotional single and first track off of his third studio album, Astroworld (released on the same day). The song debuted at number eight on the Billboard Hot 100, and was later certified platinum by the Recording Industry Association of America (RIAA).

== Composition ==
In the song, Travis Scott sings about how overcoming his past ways and abstinence from lean has helped him become a better influence. Midway through, his voice "shifts to a falsetto", and the beat switches.

== Critical reception ==
The song received critical acclaim from critics and is considered a highlight on Astroworld. Writing for Pitchfork, Michelle Kim gave the song a positive review, calling it a "potent earworm" and named it a "best new track". Reviewing Astroworld for The Fader, Ben Dandridge-Lemco praised Scott as sounding "dexterous" over the song's "dizzying" production, adding that the song's beat switch served as the album's "first loop-de-loop". In Consequence of Sound's review for the album, Wren Graves listed the song as an "essential track" and praised the two halves of the track, saying, "Scott balances the two ideas like a chef balancing sweet and sour, enhancing each with the inclusion of the other."

== Music video ==
The official music video for the song came in the form of the official trailer for Astroworld, which was released to Scott's YouTube channel on July 30, 2018. It features the first half of the song and was directed by Nabil.

== Live performances ==
Travis Scott performed the song at the 2018 MTV Video Music Awards.

== Charts ==
=== Weekly charts ===
Chart (2018)	Peak position
Australia (ARIA)	10
Austria (Ö3 Austria Top 40)	19
Belgium (Ultratip Bubbling Under Flanders)	3
Belgium (Ultratip Bubbling Under Wallonia)	15
Canada Hot 100 (Billboard)	7
Czech Republic Singles Digital (ČNS IFPI)	13
Denmark (Tracklisten)	9
Finland (Suomen virallinen lista)	16
France (SNEP)	20
Germany (GfK)	26
Ireland (IRMA)	12
Italy (FIMI)	30
Netherlands (Single Top 100)	33
New Zealand (Recorded Music NZ)	9
Norway (VG-lista)	10
Portugal (AFP)	6
Slovakia Singles Digital (ČNS IFPI)	5
Sweden (Sverigetopplistan)	19
Switzerland (Schweizer Hitparade)	10
UK Singles (Official Charts)	15
US Billboard Hot 100	8
US Hot R&B/Hip-Hop Songs (Billboard)	7

=== Year-end charts ===
Chart (2018)	Position
US Hot R&B/Hip-Hop Songs (Billboard)	98

== Certifications ==
Region	Certification	Certified units/sales
Australia (ARIA)	Platinum	70,000^{‡}
Brazil (Pro-Música Brasil)	Diamond	160,000^{‡}
Canada (Music Canada)	4× Platinum	320,000^{‡}
Denmark (IFPI Danmark)	Platinum	90,000^{‡}
France (SNEP)	Gold	100,000^{‡}
Italy (FIMI)	Gold	25,000^{‡}
Mexico (AMPROFON)	Platinum	60,000^{‡}
New Zealand (RMNZ)	2× Platinum	60,000^{‡}
Poland (ZPAV)	Platinum	50,000^{‡}
Portugal (AFP)	Platinum	10,000^{‡}
United Kingdom (BPI)	Platinum	600,000^{‡}
United States (RIAA)	4× Platinum	4,000,000^{‡}
^{‡} Sales+streaming figures based on certification alone.
