= Mannequin Challenge =

Viral Internet video trend

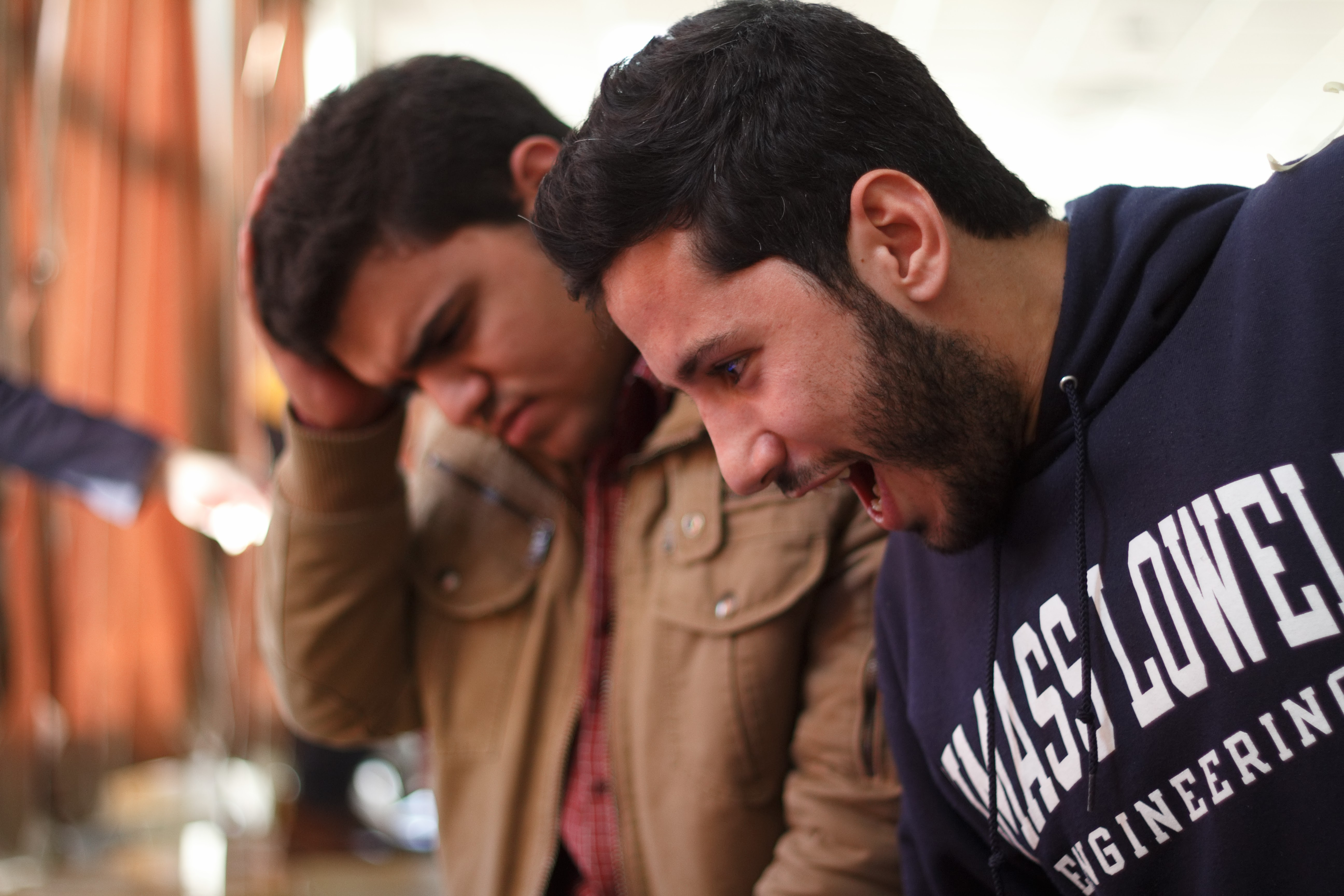
Two students acting motionless for a mannequin challenge video

Video of a mannequin challenge staged by students at the University of Jordan

The Mannequin Challenge is a viral Internet video trend which became popular in November 2016. In this challenge, participants have to stay still in action like a mannequin while a moving camera films them, often with the song "Black Beatles" by Rae Sremmurd playing in the background. The hashtag #MannequinChallenge was used for popular social media platforms such as Twitter and Instagram. It is believed that the phenomenon was started by students at Edward H. White High School in Jacksonville, Florida. The initial posting has inspired works by other groups, especially professional athletes and sports teams, who have posted increasingly complex and elaborate videos.

News outlets have compared the videos to bullet time scenes from science fiction films such as The Matrix, X-Men: Days of Future Past, X-Men: Apocalypse, Lost in Space or Buffalo '66. Meanwhile, the participatory nature of the challenge on social media makes it similar to memes such as Makankosappo or the Harlem Shake. Others have noted similarities with the HBO TV series Westworld, which debuted around the same time, where robotic hosts can be stopped in their tracks.

== Notable instances ==
=== Sports figures ===
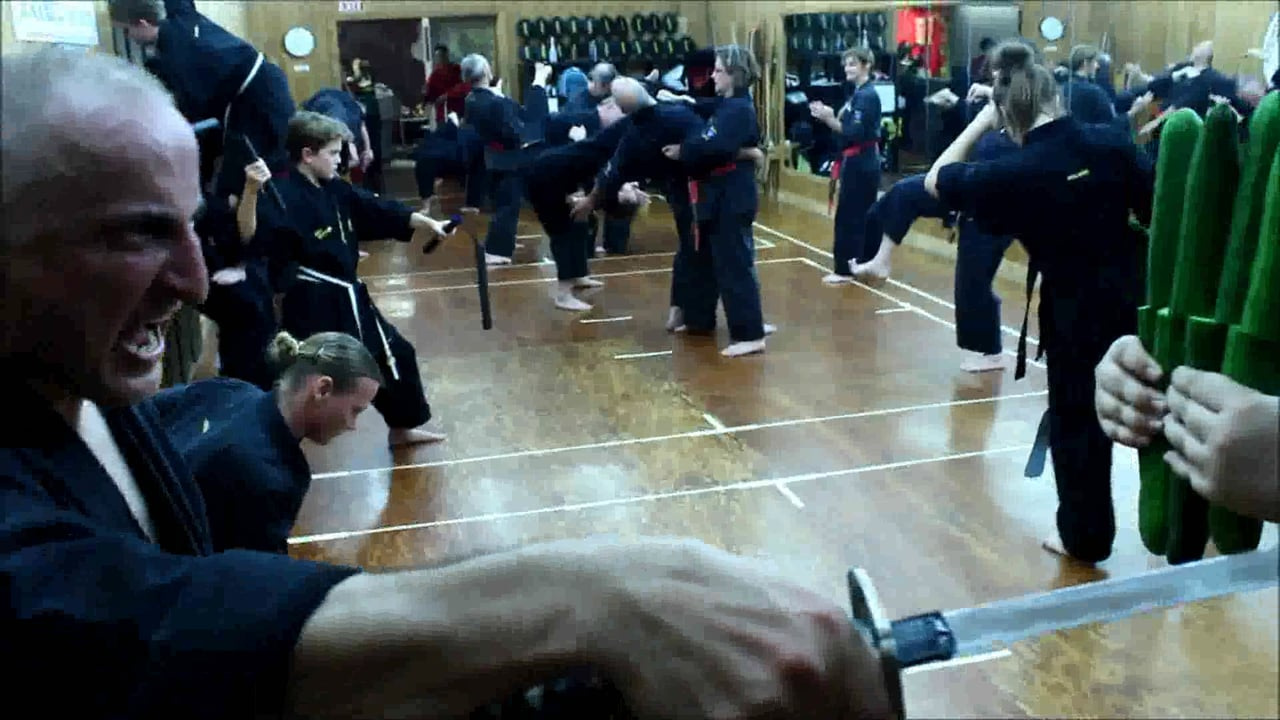
The mannequin challenge being performed by the Mississauga Academy of Martial Arts

A number of notable sports teams, including both collegiate and professional, as well as sports personalities, have engaged in the challenge. Notable instances of sport-figure participation include:

- Pittsburgh Steelers, in their locker room on November 4.
- Penn State Football, in their locker room on November 5.
- Anaheim Ducks, at their 80s center ice party on November 13.
- Dallas Cowboys, on their team plane on November 6.
- Buffalo Bills, on their team plane on November 6.
- New York Giants, in their home locker room on November 6.
- Milwaukee Bucks, on their team plane on November 6.
- University of Kentucky Wildcats basketball team, in a home exhibition game against Asbury University. Thousands of attendees in the basketball arena participated.
- Golden State Warriors player Steph Curry, with his wife Ayesha, posted a version done at a restaurant full of patrons.
- The crew of NXT made a two-minute video that was posted on November 8.
- Brigham Young University women's gymnastics team, in their gym.
- US Military Academy at Westpoint men's gymnastics team.
- Borussia Dortmund, of the German Bundesliga, in a weight room.
- Portugal national football team with Cristiano Ronaldo in their locker room.
- Manchester United players Marcus Rashford and Jesse Lingard.
- Aston Villa squad
- England international footballers Jamie Vardy, Raheem Sterling and Theo Walcott froze in place after scoring a second goal vs Spain in a friendly match on November 15.
- Spain national football team inside the Wembley changing room after their friendly match against England.
- Belgium national football team.
- European Tour golfers at Jumeirah Golf Estates in Dubai
- United States women's national soccer team posted a video doing the challenge on November 13.
- United States gymnasts Simone Biles, Nastia Liukin and Danell Leyva took part in a video while practicing for the Kellogg's Tour of Champions on November 13.
- World champion figure skaters joined the challenge on November 13 at the ISU Grand Prix of Figure Skating Trophée de France 2016/2017.
- Indonesian footballer Lerby Eliandry and Thai footballer Teerasil Dangda with their respective teammates after scoring a goal in their Group Stage match of 2016 AFF Championship.

Television broadcasters who have participated include:

- SEC Network sportscasters, crew and student crowd, on set November 5.
- ESPN College Gameday sportscasters and student crowd, November 5.
- Fox NFL Sunday sportscasters and crew, on set November 6.
- CBS Evening News crew, on set November 16.

College football teams that posted videos include Old Dominion University, Temple University, University of Pittsburgh, Louisiana State University.

=== Artists and celebrities ===
Once many versions of the challenge began surfacing with Rae Sremmurd's "Black Beatles" as the background music, Rae Sremmurd paused a concert to do a Mannequin Challenge video live on stage.

Dancing With the Stars in the U.S. created a video with cast and crew on the dance floor that was posted to dancer Val Chmerkovskiy's Instagram account.

Musical artists who participated included:

- The former members of Destiny's Child, Beyoncé, Michelle Williams and Kelly Rowland, created a video on November 7.
- Singer Adele adopted a Western theme in a November 7 video.
- Country singer Garth Brooks created a video while live on stage in a concert on November 12.
- Singer Britney Spears celebrated winning, for the second year in a row, Best Resident Performer in the Best of Las Vegas Awards by posting a video on her Instagram page on November 13 of her and her dancers doing the challenge to the sound of her single "Slumber Party", taken from her album Glory.
- Electronic dance music producer and DJ Marshmello recorded a video on stage in concert, with the crowd participating, at The Shrine Auditorium in Los Angeles.
- Former Beatles member Paul McCartney did this challenge by standing by a piano frozen while the song is playing. He showed his support for the song and the artists in a Twitter message.
- Simon Cowell, Nicole Scherzinger, Louis Walsh, Sharon Osbourne and Dermot O'Leary, along with The X Factor UK live audience and dancers participated live on 26 November 2016, during Honey G's performance of "Black Beatles".
- Reaks Records, UK released the "Mannequin Challenge" EP produced by DJ AKS.
- Taylor Swift participated in the challenge on Thanksgiving at a beach.

Ellen DeGeneres and Warren Beatty created a video of a table tennis game and posted it to Instagram.

The Late Late Show with James Corden created an elaborate video of more than 2 minutes and 30 seconds, that involved the entire crew, backstage area and studio audience.

Blac Chyna and Rob Kardashian created a video in the hospital delivery room.

The cast of Saturday Night Live created a video along with Kristen Wiig as a promotion for the season's November 19, 2016 episode.

First Lady Michelle Obama froze for the Mannequin Challenge together with LeBron James and the rest of the Cleveland Cavaliers during their visit to the White House to be honored for their NBA Championship victory.

On November 18, 2016, the erotic dance troupe Chippendales uploaded their Challenge on their social medias. On November 22, actress Tracee Ellis Ross coordinated a video before the awarding of the Presidential Medal of Freedom at the White House, which included celebrities such as Ellen DeGeneres, Robert De Niro, Tom Hanks, Bill Gates, Diana Ross, Rita Wilson, Michael Jordan, Kareem Abdul-Jabbar and Frank Gehry.

On December 6, celebrity attendees at the 2016 British Fashion Awards participated in the challenge as Gigi Hadid won the award for International Model of the Year. Anna Wintour, Donatella Versace, Christopher Bailey, Franca Sozzani, Kate Moss, Yolanda Foster and Naomi Campbell were also part of it.

On December 14, the Boston Pops Orchestra and Conductor Keith Lockhart participated in the challenge during a rehearsal for the orchestra's 43rd Annual Holiday Pops Season and posted a video on YouTube.

On December 21, the crew of Food Network's Beat Bobby Flay participated in the challenge and posted a video on Facebook.

=== Politicians ===
On November 7, the night before election day, Democratic candidate Hillary Clinton participated in a video with Jon Bon Jovi, Bill Clinton, Huma Abedin and various staffers on her campaign plane.

First Lady Michelle Obama posed for a video with the NBA champions Cleveland Cavaliers at the White House.

Former managing director of World Bank Group and current Indonesian Minister of Finance, Sri Mulyani Indrawati, did the challenge after delivering a lecture at Padjadjaran University, along with the Rector and thousands of students whom attended the lecture.

On December 13, Westmount, Quebec's city council became the first municipality to release a mannequin challenge filmed in the council chambers. The video features eight council members and the mayor frozen during a seemingly chaotic council meeting.

=== Activism ===
On November 10, film makers Simone Shepherd, Kevalena Everett and Todd Anthony made a series of videos that re-created scenes related to the Black Lives Matter movement, as a promotional teaser for their feature film Black in Blue.

In November 2016, the Revolutionaries of Syria Media Office, a Syrian media organisation, published a video showing two White Helmet volunteers performing a staged rescue operation for the meme. The organisation apologised for their volunteers' error of judgement and said it had not shared the recording on their official channels.

=== Legacy ===
Videos of the challenge uploaded to YouTube have been used to advance machine learning research in depth prediction.

=== Other examples ===
- NASCAR
  - Alex Bowman racing team
  - Hendrick Motorsports
  - Team Lowe's Racing
- Alabama Department of Corrections
- German Army
- Metropolitan Atlanta Rapid Transit Authority
- International Conference of Chabad-Lubavitch Emissaries
- Big data startup, ZoomData
- Astronauts on the International Space Station

== See also ==
- Living statue
- Tableau vivant
- Pageant of the Masters
- Bullet time
- Planking (fad)
- Statues (game)
- Harlem Shake (meme)
