= Nasty Freestyle =

2015 single by T-Wayne

Single by T-Wayne
- Released: May 4, 2015
- Recorded: 2015
- Genre: Hip hop
- Length: 2:22
- Label: 300
- Songwriters: Tyshon Nobles; Samuel Gloade
- Producer: 30 Roc

T-Wayne singles chronology
"Nasty Freestyle" (2015)	"I Be Killin It" (2015)

"Nasty Freestyle" is the debut single by American rapper T-Wayne. The song, a freestyle over the beat to Bandit Gang Marco's "Nasty" (2014), became a viral sensation in the spring of 2015; in particular, popular user-generated videos posted to Instagram and Vine featuring the song's opening couplet fueled the song's rise to prominence. Released as a digital download in the United States by 300 Entertainment on May 4, 2015, it soon became a commercial success, peaking at number nine on the US Billboard Hot 100. As of July 2015, it has sold 785,562 copies domestically. At the week ending April 26, the song had been streamed 6.4 million times in the US.

== Music video ==
Nasty Freestyle's music video was uploaded on T-Wayne's YouTube channel on February 28, 2015. The video consists of T-Wayne dancing around while lip syncing. The video was deemed to be low quality due to the shaky camera work, and a new one was filmed and was released a month later.

== Remix ==
The official remix features Ty Dolla Sign and Chedda Da Connect. A music video of the remix was released on WorldStarHipHop YouTube channel on October 2, 2015.

== Track listing ==
Digital download
No.	Title	Length
1.	"Nasty Freestyle"	2:22
2.	"Nasty Freestyle (featuring Ty Dolla Sign and Chedda Da Connect) – remix"	5:01
3.	"Nasty Freestyle [The Replay]"	2:20

== Chart performance ==
=== Weekly charts ===
Chart (2015)	Peak position
Australia (ARIA)	37
Australia Urban (ARIA)	106
Belgium (Ultratip Bubbling Under Flanders)	41
Belgium Urban (Ultratop Flanders)	21
Canada Hot 100 (Billboard)	25
Denmark (Tracklisten)	10
Germany (GfK)	85
Ireland (IRMA)	65
Netherlands (Single Top 100)	74
New Zealand (Recorded Music NZ)	37
Sweden (Sverigetopplistan)	41
UK Singles (Official Charts)	41
UK Hip Hop/R&B (Official Charts)	8
US Billboard Hot 100	9
US Hot R&B/Hip-Hop Songs (Billboard)	4
US Rhythmic Airplay (Billboard)	24

=== Year-end charts ===
Chart (2015)	Position
US Billboard Hot 100	50
US Hot R&B/Hip-Hop Songs	15

== Certifications ==
Region	Certification	Certified units/sales
Denmark (IFPI Danmark)	Gold	30,000^{^}
New Zealand (RMNZ)	Gold	7,500^{*}
United Kingdom (BPI)	Silver	200,000^{‡}
United States (RIAA)	Platinum	1,000,000^{‡}
^{*} Sales figures based on certification alone.^{^} Shipments figures based on certification alone.^{‡} Sales+streaming figures based on certification alone.

== Release history ==
Region	Date	Format	Label
United States	May 4, 2015	Digital download	300
