= Swang (song) =

- Cover art for the remix with Travis Scott

Single by Rae Sremmurd

from the album SremmLife 2 (deluxe edition)
- Released: August 12, 2016
- Recorded: 2016
- Genre: Hip-hop; trap; cloud rap
- Length: 3:28
- Label: EarDrummers; Interscope
- Songwriters: Khalif Brown; Aaquil Brown; Pierre Slaughter
- Producer: P-Nazty

Rae Sremmurd singles chronology
"Black Beatles" (2016)	"Swang" (2016)	"Perfect Pint" (2017)

Music video
- "Swang" on YouTube

"Swang" is a song by American hip-hop duo Rae Sremmurd. It was released on January 24, 2017, by EarDrummers and Interscope Records as the fourth single from their second studio album, SremmLife 2. The song was written alongside producer P-Nazty.

== Music video ==
The song's accompanying music video premiered on February 16, 2017, on Rae Sremmurd's YouTube account on Vevo. The video was directed by Max Hliva (DirectedByMAX). The music video has over 504 million views as of November 2025.

== Remix ==
The official remix of "Swang" features American rapper Travis Scott and was released on October 16, 2016.

== Personnel ==
Credits adapted from SremmLife 2 booklet.

Song credits

- Writing – Aaquil Brown, Khalif Brown, Pierre Slaughter
- Production – P-Nazty
- Recording – Randy Lanphear & Swae Lee at Sauce Studios and PatchWerk Recording Studios in Atlanta, Georgia
- Audio mixing – Finis "KY" White at Bass Recording Studios in Atlanta, Georgia
- Mastering – Dave Kutch, The Mastering Palace, New York City

== Charts ==
=== Weekly charts ===
Chart (2017)	Peak position
Canada Hot 100 (Billboard)	41
US Billboard Hot 100	26
US Hot R&B/Hip-Hop Songs (Billboard)	13
US R&B/Hip-Hop Airplay (Billboard)	17
US Rhythmic Airplay (Billboard)	30

=== Year-end charts ===
Chart (2017)	Position
Canada (Canadian Hot 100)	97
US Billboard Hot 100	64
US Hot R&B/Hip-Hop Songs (Billboard)	32

== Certifications ==
Region	Certification	Certified units/sales
Brazil (Pro-Música Brasil)	2× Platinum	120,000^{‡}
Canada (Music Canada)	Platinum	80,000^{‡}
New Zealand (RMNZ)	Platinum	30,000^{‡}
Poland (ZPAV)	Gold	25,000^{‡}
United Kingdom (BPI)	Silver	200,000^{‡}
United States (RIAA)	6× Platinum	6,000,000^{‡}
^{‡} Sales+streaming figures based on certification alone.
