= Fr Fr =

Song by Wiz Khalifa featuring Lil Skies

Single by Wiz Khalifa featuring Lil Skies

from the album Rolling Papers 2
- Released: September 18, 2018
- Length: 3:15
- Label: Taylor Gang; Atlantic
- Songwriters: Cameron Thomaz; Kimetrius Foose; Eric Dan; Jeremy Kulousek; Zachary Vaughan; Tyler Mason
- Producers: I.D. Labs; Nostxlgic

Wiz Khalifa singles chronology
"I'll Beat Yo Ass" (2018)	"Fr Fr" (2018)	"What I Know Now" (2018)

Lil Skies singles chronology
"No Rest" (2018)	"Fr Fr" (2018)	"Opps Want Me Dead" (2018)

Music video
- "Fr Fr" on YouTube

"Fr Fr" ("For Real For Real") is a song by American rapper Wiz Khalifa featuring fellow American rapper Lil Skies. It is the fifth single from the former's sixth studio album Rolling Papers 2 (2018). The song was produced by I.D. Labs and Nostxlgic.

== Critical reception ==
Kevin Goddard of HotNewHipHop gave the song a "Very Hottt" rating. Preezy of XXL regarded the song as among the "forgettable" tracks of Rolling Papers 2 that "leave much to be desired".

== Music video ==
The music video was released on September 18, 2018. Directed by Cole Bennett, it finds the rappers as employees at a grocery store and also being seen as action figures and household products in scattered scenes. The clip opens with Wiz Khalifa working as a cashier before abandoning his duties to smoke a joint. Lil Skies, who is working in the meat department, joins him, and they begin a party in the market. While Skies leads a "mosh pit" in an aisle, a woman removes her tops and another one is seen twerking. The store manager shows up and berates the employees, but a worker throws a can of tomato sauce on him, blinding him. They physically remove him from the store and continue partying outside in the parking lot, with more customers and employees joining.

== Charts ==
Chart (2018)	Peak position
Canada Hot 100 (Billboard)	89
US Billboard Hot 100	73
US Hot R&B/Hip-Hop Songs (Billboard)	31

== Certifications ==
Region	Certification	Certified units/sales
United States (RIAA)	Gold	500,000^{‡}
^{‡} Sales+streaming figures based on certification alone.
