= Black Beatles =

2016 song by Rae Sremmurd

Single by Rae Sremmurd featuring Gucci Mane

from the album SremmLife 2
- Released: September 13, 2016
- Recorded: 2016
- Genre: Hip hop; trap
- Length: 4:51
- Label: EarDrummers; Interscope
- Songwriters: Khalif Brown; Aaquil Brown; Radric Davis; Michael Williams
- Producer: Mike WiLL Made It

Rae Sremmurd singles chronology
"Look Alive" (2016)	"Black Beatles" (2016)	"Swang" (2017)

Gucci Mane singles chronology
"Prolly" (2016)	"Black Beatles" (2016)	"Bling Blaww Burr" (2016)

Music video
- "Black Beatles" on YouTube

"Black Beatles" is a song by American hip hop duo Rae Sremmurd featuring American rapper Gucci Mane. Produced by Mike Will Made It, it was released in 2016, by EarDrummers and Interscope Records as the third single from their second studio album SremmLife 2.

Following viral exposure, due in large part to its role in the Mannequin Challenge trend, it became both Rae Sremmurd's and Gucci Mane's first number-one single on both the US Billboard Hot 100 and the New Zealand Official New Zealand Music Chart as well as their first top ten appearances in countries such as Australia, Canada, and the UK.

== Background and composition ==
The song was one of the last tracks recorded for SremmLife 2 and was a major reason for the album's delay from its planned June release date. Musically, "Black Beatles" is a hip hop and trap song with lo-fi production.

== Critical reception ==
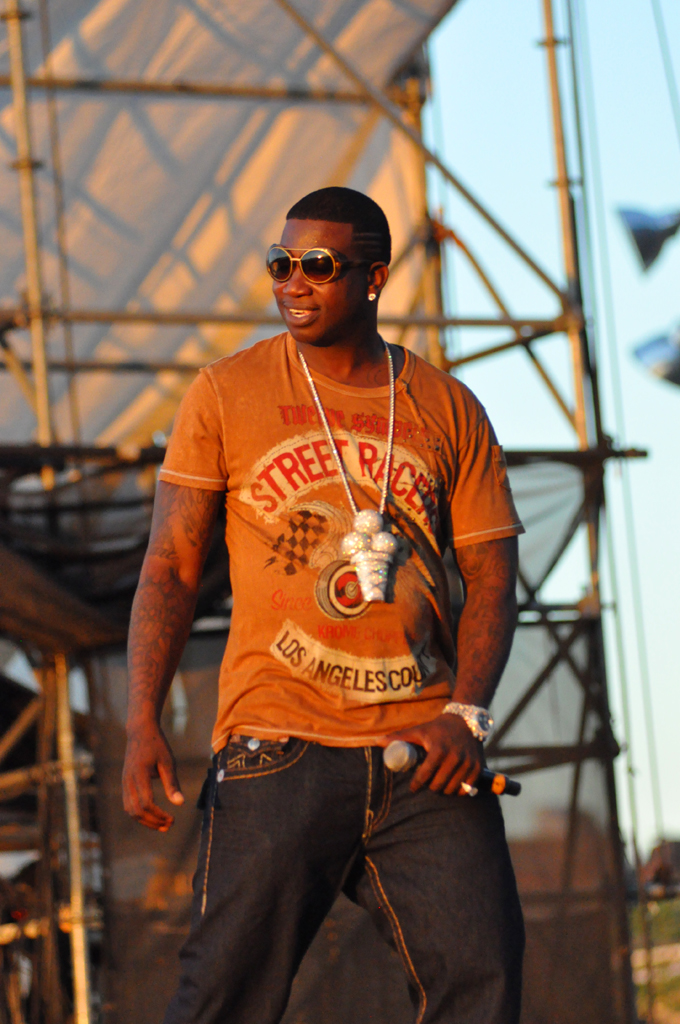
"Black Beatles" features guest vocals from Atlanta-based rapper Gucci Mane

"Black Beatles" received positive reviews from music critics. Andrew Unterberger of Billboard stated that "Black Beatles" is "a vital, quintessentially youthful song, which is extremely welcome in this oncoming era of social conservatism." Though both brothers Khalif 'Swae Lee' Brown and Aaquil 'Slim Jxmmi' Brown are now of legal voting age, as an entity Rae Sremmurd remains decidedly new-wave, part of Atlanta's bumper crop of young MCs who are less concerned with paying fealty to hip-hop history than they are with blowing out the genre's formalistic constraints to their own thrilling, individualistic ends. Which isn't to say that the Chainsmokers and Halsey were stodgy and back-to-basics, either—'Closer' was, in some ways, a blockbusting song in its own right—but after 12 weeks, any song becomes Establishment. Change was needed, and change was delivered." He also stated that while "'Black Beatles' is certainly not an explicitly political song, and the duo might understandably roll their eyes at any reading of their now-signature hit that suggests that it is," he praised the duo for the group's tribute to the Beatles and their ability to subvert expectations of the status quo.

Rolling Stone's editor Rob Sheffield ranked "Black Beatles" at number ten in his year-end list:

"No wonder Macca himself is a fan. The rap duo come together and rock their John Lennon lenses with a party-and-bullshit anthem so undeniable it hit Number One. Everybody's welcome at their club: young bloods, old geezers, weirdo girls with green hair, dealers, haters, Gucci Mane. A blunted time is guaranteed for all."

Pitchfork would later list "Black Beatles" on their ranking of the 100 best songs of 2016 at number 10. Meanwhile, Billboard named "Black Beatles" the best pop song of 2016. In the annual Village Voice's Pazz & Jop mass critics poll of the year's best in music in 2016, "Black Beatles" was ranked at number 4.

== Commercial performance ==
"Black Beatles" peaked at number one on the US Billboard Hot 100, becoming both Rae Sremmurd's and Gucci Mane's first number one single and the most successful yet of their careers, and dislodged the Chainsmokers and Halsey's "Closer" for the top spot, which had held that for 12 consecutive weeks. The song topped the chart for seven non-consecutive weeks. On the issue dated January 7, 2017, it lost the top spot to "Starboy" by the Weeknd featuring Daft Punk, though returned to number one the following week. It also peaked at number one in Indonesia and New Zealand. The song had already entered the top 20 of the US Billboard charts before its surge in performance following the Mannequin Challenge. It dropped out of the top ten on February 25, 2017, after spending fourteen consecutive weeks there. It also peaked at number two in the UK and number three in Ireland, Canada and Australia, becoming both artists' highest-charting single in those countries.

As of February 11, 2017, "Black Beatles" has sold 1,188,000 copies in the United States. The track has also been certified Diamond by the RIAA.

In the UK Singles Chart, the song debuted at number 36 on the week ending on November 17, 2016. The following week, it rose to number four, before spending three consecutive weeks at number two.

== Music video ==
On September 22, 2016, the music video for "Black Beatles" featuring Gucci Mane was released on Rae Sremmurd's Vevo account on YouTube. The video contains a number of visual references to Beatles iconography and lore. It was directed by Motion Family. The video has over 1.5 billion views on YouTube.

== Usage in media ==
On October 26, 2016, the Mannequin Challenge went viral. The trend involves shooting footage of a crowd standing frozen in place, often using "Black Beatles" as background music.

On November 30, 2016, Nicki Minaj and Mike Will Made It released a remix of the song together titled "Black Barbies". It uses the instrumental from the song, and similar lyrics. This version peaked at 65 in the United States and 78 in Canada.

Soulja Boy released a freestyle to the song, also using the song's instrumentation as well as similar lyrics. It was included on his 2016 mixtape King Soulja 7.

Rae Sremmurd makes a cameo appearance in the 2017 film Boo 2! A Madea Halloween, in which they perform "Black Beatles".

The song also makes an appearance in the boat scene in season one of Netflix's Ozark.

== Credits and personnel ==
Credits adapted from SremmLife 2 booklet.

Song credits

- Writing – Aaquil Brown, Khalif Brown, Radric Davis, Michael Williams II
- Production – Mike Will Made It
- Recording – Randy Lanphear & Swae Lee at Sauce Studios in Atlanta, Georgia
- Gucci Mane verse recording – Sean Payne at Gucci's Home Studio in Atlanta, Georgia
- Audio mixing – Stephen Hybicki - Maddox Chhim - Jaycen Joshua
- Mastering – Dave Kutch, The Mastering Palace, New York City

== Charts ==
=== Weekly charts ===
Chart (2016–2017)	Peak position
Australia (ARIA)	3
Australia Urban (ARIA)	1
Austria (Ö3 Austria Top 40)	13
Belgium (Ultratop 50 Flanders)	9
Belgium (Ultratop 50 Wallonia)	22
Canada Hot 100 (Billboard)	3
Canada CHR/Top 40 (Billboard)	34
Canada Hot AC (Billboard)	45
Colombia (National-Report)	94
Czech Republic Singles Digital (ČNS IFPI)	7
Denmark (Tracklisten)	2
Finland (Suomen virallinen lista)	2
France (SNEP)	2
Germany (GfK)	8
Germany (Airplay Chart)	26
Hungary (Single Top 40)	15
Ireland (IRMA)	3
Israel International Airplay (Media Forest)	8
Italy (FIMI)	16
Lebanon (Lebanese Top 20)	8
Netherlands (Dutch Top 40)	13
Netherlands (Single Top 100)	6
New Zealand (Recorded Music NZ)	1
Norway (VG-lista)	2
Portugal (AFP)	3
Romania (Airplay 100)	40
Scotland Singles (Official Charts)	4
Slovakia Singles Digital (ČNS IFPI)	7
Spain (Promusicae)	30
Sweden (Sverigetopplistan)	3
Switzerland (Schweizer Hitparade)	4
UK Singles (Official Charts)	2
UK Hip Hop/R&B (Official Charts)	1
US Billboard Hot 100	1
US Hot R&B/Hip-Hop Songs (Billboard)	1
US Dance Club Songs (Billboard)	39
US Pop Airplay (Billboard)	13
US Rhythmic Airplay (Billboard)	1

=== Year-end charts ===
Chart (2016)	Position
Australia (ARIA)	92
Australia Urban (ARIA)	9
France (SNEP)	184
Hungary (Single Top 40)	97
UK Singles (Official Charts Company)	95
US Hot R&B/Hip-Hop Songs (Billboard)	37

Chart (2017)	Position
Canada (Canadian Hot 100)	45
US Billboard Hot 100	19
US Hot R&B/Hip-Hop Songs (Billboard)	11
US Rhythmic (Billboard)	10

== Certifications ==
Region	Certification	Certified units/sales
Australia (ARIA)	3× Platinum	210,000^{‡}
Belgium (BRMA)	Gold	10,000^{‡}
Brazil (Pro-Música Brasil)	Diamond	250,000^{‡}
Denmark (IFPI Danmark)	Platinum	90,000^{‡}
France (SNEP)	Platinum	133,333^{‡}
Germany (BVMI)	Platinum	400,000^{‡}
Italy (FIMI)	Platinum	50,000^{‡}
New Zealand (RMNZ)	2× Platinum	60,000^{‡}
Norway (IFPI Norway)	Platinum	40,000^{‡}
Poland (ZPAV)	2× Platinum	100,000^{‡}
Portugal (AFP)	Gold	5,000^{‡}
Spain (Promusicae)	Gold	20,000^{‡}
United Kingdom (BPI)	2× Platinum	1,200,000^{‡}
United States (RIAA)	Diamond	10,000,000^{‡}
^{‡} Sales+streaming figures based on certification alone.

== See also ==
- List of Billboard Hot 100 number-one singles of 2016
- List of Billboard Hot 100 number-one singles of 2017
- List of number-one singles from the 2010s (New Zealand)
- List of number-one urban singles of 2016 (Australia)
