= Same Difference (Swae Lee album) =

Studio album by Swae Lee
- Released: April 3, 2026
- Recorded: 2025–2026
- Genre: Hip-hop
- Length: 60:41
- Labels: Ear Drummer; Interscope
- Producers: 30 Roc; Allen Ritter; Chopsquad DJ; Frank Dukes; London on da Track; Louis Bell; Mike Will Made It; Pluss; Swae Lee; Turbo; 2latefor; 8 Major; Albin; Ambezza; Big Cuz; Chad Keyz; CHASETHEMONEY; David Morse; Eric Choice; GOPRESSPLAY; Guavo; J-Bo; Livso; Mally Mall; Melz; Nik D; Papatinho; QuisGOtHitz; Resource; Rex Kudo; Ricky Polo; Rosen Beatz; Saint Luca; Scorp Dezel; simon!; SLOAN; Synco; The Elements; TheSkyBeats; Twon Beatz; VITALS

Swae Lee chronology
Swaecation (2018)	Same Difference (2026)

Singles from Same Difference
- 1. "Flammable" Released: February 27, 2026; 2. "Don't Even Call" Released: March 20, 2026; 3. "Mural" Released: April 6, 2026

Same Difference is the second studio album by American rapper and Rae Sremmurd member Swae Lee. It was released on April 3, 2026, by Ear Drummer Records and Interscope Records. It features guest appearances by French Montana, Jhené Aiko, Nav, Post Malone, Rich the Kid and Slim Jxmmi. It features notable productions by Swae Lee himself, 30 Roc, Allen Ritter, Chopsquad DJ, Frank Dukes, London on da Track, Louis Bell, Mike Will Made It, Pluss and Turbo.

== Background ==
On February 23, 2026, Swae Lee released the official artwork and release date of the album on his Instagram account.

On February 27, 2026, he released the debut single of the album entitled Flammable.

On March 20, 2026, he released the second single of the album entitled Don't Even Call, which features Rich the Kid.

== Track listing ==
Same Difference track listing
No.	Title	Writer(s)	Producer(s)	Length
1.	"Tomato/Tomáto (Same Difference)"	Khalif Brown; Samuel Gloade; Chevez Clarke; Eric Sloan, Jr.	30 Roc; 8 Major; Big Cuz; Sloan	4:24
2.	"No Call No Show" (with Nav)	K. Brown; Navraj Goraya	Guavo; Livso; 2latefor	5:16
3.	"Everyone Wants"	K. Brown; Eric Choice; Masamune Kudo; Adam Feeney; Braylin Bowman	Swae Lee; Ging; Resource; Rex Kudo; Choice	3:06
4.	"The Gospel"	K. Brown; Chandler Great; Keven Wolfsohn; Paul Goller	Turbo; the Elements	3:12
5.	"MURAL" (with Jhené Aiko)	K. Brown; Jhené Chilombo; Mathias Liyew; Nik Frascona	Ambezza; Nik D	3:26
6.	"Side Eye"	K. Brown; Alexander Wu	Synco; Vitals	3:21
7.	"E Off Emotion"	K. Brown; Michael Williams II; Asheton Hogan; Christian Arceo; Jeffrey Johnson; Kevin Erondu; DeAndre Way	Swae Lee; Mike Will Made It; Pluss; Melz; Gopressplay	3:30
8.	"Suitcase" (with French Montana)	K. Brown; Karim Kharbouch; Antwon Hicks; Marquis Smith; James Forman	Twon Beatz; QuisGotHitz; Chad Keyz	3:52
9.	"Don't Even Call" (with Rich the Kid)	K. Brown; Dimitri Roger; Justin Garner; Anders Lunøe; Frederik Thrane	Swae Lee; J-Bo; Saint Luca; TheSkyBeats	3:30
10.	"Flammable"	K. Brown; David Morse; Jason Rosenberg	Morse; Rosen Beatz	3:17
11.	"Fav / Anna"	K. Brown; Riccardo Polo	Ricky Polo	3:38
12.	"Sneakier"	K. Brown; Darrell Jackson; Chase Rose	Swae Lee; Chopsquad DJ; ChaseTheMoney	3:34
13.	"Raising Awareness"	K. Brown; London Holmes; Allen Ritter	London on da Track; Ritter	3:43
14.	"Working Remote" (with Slim Jxmmi)	K. Brown; Aaquil Brown; Oluwaseyi Agbeti; Jamal Rashid; Tiago Alves	Mike Will Made It; Scorp Dezel; Papatinho; Mally Mall; Simon!; Albin	5:11
15.	"Violet"	K. Brown; Williams; Rashid	Mike Will Made It; Scorp Dezel; Mally Mall; Simon!; Albin	3:59
16.	"Take My Heart" (with Post Malone)	K. Brown; Austin Post; Louis Bell	Bell	3:41
Total length:				60:41
