= Hopeless Romantic (Wiz Khalifa song) =

Single by Wiz Khalifa featuring Swae Lee

from the album Rolling Papers 2
- Released: June 22, 2018
- Recorded: 2017
- Genre: Trap
- Length: 3:20
- Label: Atlantic
- Songwriters: Cameron Thomaz; Tyree Pittman; Chris Barnett; Khalif Brown
- Producers: Young Chop; CBMix

Wiz Khalifa singles chronology
"Real Rich" (2018)	"Hopeless Romantic" (2018)	"Gin & Drugs" (2018)

Swae Lee singles chronology
"Guatemala" (2018)	"Hopeless Romantic" (2018)	"Real Friends" (2018)

Music video
- "Hopeless Romantic feat. Swae Lee on YouTube

"Hopeless Romantic" is a song by American rapper Wiz Khalifa featuring fellow American rapper Swae Lee of Rae Sremmurd, from the former's sixth studio album Rolling Papers 2 (2018). It was released to urban contemporary radio on August 7, 2018, by Atlantic Records as the album's second radio single (third single overall). It was produced by Young Chop & CBMix.

== Music video ==
The official music video debuted on August 13, 2018, and received 3 million views its first week of availability. As of April 2023, the video has over 86 million views.

== Live performances ==
The rappers performed "Hopeless Romantic" on The Tonight Show on July 19, 2018.

== Charts ==
Chart (2018)	Peak position
Canada Hot 100 (Billboard)	83
US Billboard Hot 100	72
US Hot R&B/Hip-Hop Songs (Billboard)	30
US Rhythmic Airplay (Billboard)	33

== Certifications ==
Region	Certification	Certified units/sales
New Zealand (RMNZ)	Gold	15,000^{‡}
United States (RIAA)	2x Platinum	0^{‡}
^{‡} Sales+streaming figures based on certification alone.

== Release history ==
Country	Date	Format	Label	Ref.
United States	June 21, 2018	Digital download	Taylor Gang; Atlantic	
United States	August 7, 2018	Urban contemporary radio	Taylor Gang; Atlantic	
