= Won't Be Late =

Single by Swae Lee featuring Drake
- Released: August 16, 2019
- Genre: Afrobeats; dancehall
- Length: 3:38
- Label: EarDrummer; Interscope
- Songwriters: Khalif Brown; Aubrey Graham; Kelechukwu Augustine; Michael Williams
- Producers: Tekno; Mike Will Made It (add.)

Swae Lee singles chronology
"Sextasy" (2019)	"Won't Be Late" (2019)	"Diva" (2019)

Drake singles chronology
"Gold Roses" (2019)	"Won't Be Late" (2019)	"Ela É do Tipo" (2019)

"Won't Be Late" is a song by American rapper Swae Lee featuring Canadian rapper Drake, released as a single by EarDrummers Records on August 16, 2019. It was produced by Tekno with additional production by Mike Will Made It, and released alongside Swae Lee's solo track "Sextasy".

== Critical reception ==
Rolling Stone wrote that the song's "island and house-flavored grooves servpe as an undercurrent to [Swae Lee and Drake's] rhymes, which discuss the merits of taking it slow in a relationship". XXL described the song as a "banger" and a "dance track" with an "island bop" featuring Swae Lee's "croons" and Drake rhyming about a "complicated relationship".

== Personnel ==
Credits adapted from Tidal.

- Swae Lee – main vocalist, writing
- Drake – vocalist, writing
- Tekno – production, writing
- Mike Will Made It – additional production, writing
- Noel Cadastre – recording
- 40 OVO – mixing
- Chris Athens – mastering

== Charts ==
Chart (2019)	Peak position
Belgium (Ultratip Bubbling Under Flanders)	12
Belgium (Ultratip Bubbling Under Wallonia)	42
Canada Hot 100 (Billboard)	34
Ireland (IRMA)	57
Lithuania (AGATA)	39
Netherlands (Single Top 100)	74
New Zealand Hot Singles (RMNZ)	10
Portugal (AFP)	93
Sweden Heatseeker (Sverigetopplistan)	1
Switzerland (Schweizer Hitparade)	60
UK Singles (Official Charts)	50
US Billboard Hot 100	75
US Hot R&B/Hip-Hop Songs (Billboard)	30
US Rhythmic Airplay (Billboard)	23
US Rolling Stone Top 100	37

== Certifications ==
Region	Certification	Certified units/sales
United Kingdom (BPI)	Silver	200,000^{‡}
United States (RIAA)	Gold	500,000^{‡}
^{‡} Sales+streaming figures based on certification alone.

== Release history ==
Region	Date	Format	Label	Ref.
Various	August 16, 2019	Digital download; streaming	EarDrummer; Interscope	
United States	August 27, 2019	Rhythmic contemporary	EarDrummer; Interscope	
