= Guatemala (song) =

2018 single by Swae Lee, Slim Jxmmi and Rae Sremmurd

Single by Swae Lee featuring Slim Jxmmi

from the album Swaecation (part of SR3MM)
- Released: April 11, 2018
- Genre: Afrobeats; dancehall; R&B
- Length: 4:16
- Label: EarDrummers; Interscope
- Songwriters: Khalif Brown; Aaquil Brown; Jamal Rashid; Akintude Akinwande; Karl Rubin
- Producers: Mally Mall; TuneDaRula; Rubin

Swae Lee singles chronology
"Hurt to Look" (2018)	"Guatemala" (2018)	"Hopeless Romantic" (2018)

Music video
- "Guatemala" on YouTube

"Guatemala" is a song by American rapper Swae Lee in collaboration with his brother and fellow American rapper Slim Jxmmi, the other half of Rae Sremmurd. It was released on April 11, 2018 as the second single from Lee's debut studio album Swaecation (2018), part of a triple album set of Rae Sremmurd's third studio album SR3MM. and was produced by Mally Mall, TuneDaRula and Rubin.

== Composition ==
"Guatemala" is a afrobeats and dancehall-inspired song. It features a "minimal Caribbean-styled backbeat" and "airy synths" in the production. In Auto-Tune vocals, Swae Lee suggests to his girlfriend that they go on vacation to Guatemala, on private jets, and sings about "quiet moments of seduction". Slim Jxmmi's verse has been described as a blend of rapping and singing.

== Music video ==
The official music video was released on June 22, 2018, and was filmed in Guatemala a month before the 2018 Volcán de Fuego eruption. The video opens with a message noting this and with the words, "Our hearts and prayers are with the people of Guatemala." It shows Rae Sremmurd enjoying a vacation in Guatemala, where they dance with the locals and "finesse the ladies". The song also features cameos from Mike Will Made It and Mally Mall.

== Live performances ==
Rae Sremmurd performed the song on Good Morning America and The Tonight Show Starring Jimmy Fallon on July 17 and August 9, 2018 respectively.

== Charts ==
Chart (2018)	Peak position
Canada Hot 100 (Billboard)	39
New Zealand Hot Singles (RMNZ)	36
Sweden Heatseeker (Sverigetopplistan)	17
Switzerland (Schweizer Hitparade)	71
UK Singles (OCC)	92
US Billboard Hot 100	84
US Hot R&B/Hip-Hop Songs (Billboard)	39

== Certifications ==
Region	Certification	Certified units/sales
Brazil (Pro-Música Brasil)	Gold	20,000^{‡}
Canada (Music Canada)	Platinum	80,000^{‡}
New Zealand (RMNZ)	Gold	15,000^{‡}
United Kingdom (BPI)	Gold	400,000^{‡}
United States (RIAA)	Platinum	1,000,000^{‡}
^{‡} Sales+streaming figures based on certification alone.
