= SR3MM =

2018 studio album by Rae Sremmurd

Studio album by Rae Sremmurd
- Released: May 4, 2018
- Genres: Hip-hop; pop-trap
- Length: 38:04; 101:30 (inc. Swaecation and Jxmtro)
- Labels: Ear Drummer; Interscope
- Producers: 30 Roc; Chopsquad DJ; D-Jay Sremm; Diego Ave; J-Bo; Jean-Marie Hovart; Kent Lucciano; Mally Mall; Marz; Metro Boomin; Mike Will Made It; Pluss; Swae Lee; TM88

Rae Sremmurd chronology
SremmLife 2 (2016)	SR3MM (2018)	Sremm 4 Life (2023)

Singles from SR3MM
- 1. "Perplexing Pegasus" Released: August 4, 2017; 2. "T'd Up" Released: February 5, 2018; 3. "Powerglide" Released: March 1, 2018; 4. "Close" Released: April 18, 2018

Swaecation

Studio album by Swae Lee
- Released: May 4, 2018
- Genres: R&B; pop
- Length: 35:13
- Labels: Ear Drummer; Interscope
- Producers: Bizness Boi; Chopsquad DJ; Daniel + Harry; EY; Fwdslxsh; G. Ry; Karl Rubin; Mally Mall; Marz; Mike Will Made It; Neenyo; Scorp Dezel; Singawd; TuneDaRula

Swae Lee chronology
Swaecation (2018)	Same Difference (2026)

Singles from Swaecation
- 1. "Hurt to Look" Released: March 1, 2018; 2. "Guatemala" Released: April 11, 2018

Jxmtro

Studio album by Slim Jxmmi
- Released: May 4, 2018
- Genre: Trap
- Length: 28:13
- Labels: Ear Drummer; Interscope
- Producers: 30 Roc; Ducko McFli; Frank Dukes; G. Lo; J-Bo; Kilo Keyz; Marz; Mike Will Made It; Pluss; TL on the Beat; Yung Lan; Zaytoven

Singles from Jxmtro
- 1. "Brxnks Truck" Released: March 1, 2018; 2. "Chanel" Released: April 5, 2018

SR3MM is the third studio album by American hip-hop duo Rae Sremmurd. Released on May 4, 2018, by Ear Drummer Records and Interscope Records, it serves as a triple album, including the debut solo studio albums by both members, Swaecation by Swae Lee and Jxmtro by Slim Jxmmi. The album features various guest appearances: SR3MM features Juicy J, Travis Scott, Future, and the Weeknd, Swaecation features Young Thug, and Jxmtro features Pharrell Williams, Trouble, Zoë Kravitz, and Riff 3x.

SR3MM was supported by eight singles: "Perplexing Pegasus", "T'd Up", "Powerglide" and "Close" for SR3MM; "Hurt to Look" and "Guatemala" for Swaecation; and "Brxnks Truck" and "Chanel" for Jxmtro. The album received generally positive reviews from critics and debuted at number six on the US Billboard 200, with 57,000 album-equivalent units in its first week.

== Background ==
In early 2018, Rae Sremmurd and Mike Will Made It announced that Swae Lee and Slim Jxmmi would release their solo albums—Swaecation and Jxmtro—in the same package with an album by the duo, as a triple album package called SR3MM.

== Promotion ==
The lead singles from the albums SR3MM, Swaecation and Jxmtro, "Perplexing Pegasus", "Hurt to Look" and "Brxnks Truck" was released on August 4, 2017, while the latter two were released on March 1, 2018, simultaneously. The production for "Perplexing Pegasus" was handled by the duo's frequent collaborators Mike Will Made It, J-Bo, as well as Kent Lucciano, while "Hurt to Look", was handled by Bizness Boi, FWDSLXSH and EY, and "Brxnks Truck" was handled by Mike Will Made It and J-Bo. The Tomás Whitmore-directed music video was released on November 17, 2017. "Perplexing Pegasus" performed moderately on charts, peaking at number 84 on the US Billboard Hot 100. The song was used in 15 second television commercials advertising each of the 12 National Football League (NFL) teams then competing in the 2017–18 playoffs.

The second singles from the albums SR3MM, Swaecation and Jxmtro, "T'd Up", "Guatemala" and "Chanel" featuring Swae Lee and Pharrell, was released on February 5, 2018, April 11, 2018 and April 5, 2018, respectively. The production for "T'd Up" was handled by Metro Boomin, Chopsquad DJ and Swae Lee, while the production for "Guatemala", was handled by Mally Mall, TuneDaRula and Karl Rubin, and "Chanel" by Mike Will Made It and 30 Roc. "Guatemala" also performed moderately as "Perplexing Pegasus", peaking at number 84 on the Billboard Hot 100.

The third single from the album SR3MM, "Powerglide" featuring Juicy J, was released on March 1, 2018. The production was handled by Mally Mall, Jean Hovart and Mike Will Made It. The Andy Hines-directed music video was released on March 13, 2018. The song peaked at number 28 on the Billboard Hot 100.

The fourth single from the album SR3MM, "Close" featuring Travis Scott, was released on April 18, 2018. The production was handled by 30 Roc and Mike Will Made It. The song peaked at number 98 on the Billboard Hot 100.

== Critical reception ==
Professional ratings
Aggregate scores
Source	Rating
AnyDecentMusic?	6.9/10
Metacritic	76/100
Review scores
Source	Rating
AllMusic	4/5 stars
The A.V. Club	B+
Consequence	C+
Exclaim!	7/10
The Guardian	3/5 stars
Highsnobiety	4.0/5
HotNewHipHop	79%
Pitchfork	8.1/10 (SR3MM); 7.4/10 (Swaecation); 7.6/10 (Jxmtro)
Rolling Stone	4/5 stars

Publications varied in reviewing the albums as a collective album or individually. The triple-disc album was met with generally positive reviews. At Metacritic, which assigns a normalized rating out of 100 to reviews from mainstream publications, the album received an average score of 76, based on 10 reviews. Aggregator AnyDecentMusic? gave it 6.9 out of 10, based on their assessment of the critical consensus.

Neil Yeung of AllMusic concluded that "Taken as a whole – SR3MM is nearly two hours long – the album is a serious time investment. However, broken up into three parts as intended, it provides a trio of easily digestible bites that gives Swae Lee and Slim Jxmmi freedom to indulge their own artistry while maintaining their bond as a duo". Alexis Petridis of The Guardian concluded that SR3MM is "a decent triple album, but it would have been better yet boiled down to an eclectic single album" as "the grandness of the presentation slightly oversells the contents. Neither of the albums are as epic a statement as the concept suggests, and the best tracks from each could happily live side by side on a single album". Sheldon Pearce of Pitchfork summarized: "The triple album from Slim Jxmmi and Swae Lee is their clearest personal statement yet." Meaghan Garvey of Rolling Stone wrote that "The hip hop duo's 27-track opus takes the electric chemistry that made them stars into rich new territory", adding that "their music has grown lusher, their cadences more complex, making the leap to SR3MM less of a stretch that it might seem". Clayton Purdom of The A.V. Club believed that SR3MM "delivers quantity and quality by zeroing in on its creators' charisma, clarifying the appeal that's been there the whole time. In the strange pantheon of triple LPs, there's nothing else like it". Online publication Highsnobiety stated: "The collective album, overall, is more innovative, more daring, and flat-out riskier than its predecessors", adding that "the three albums contain fresh, carefully curated music."

In a mixed review, Wren Graves of Consequence wrote that "There's the idea — the idea — that combined solo albums can add up to more than the sum of their parts. But musically, Speakerboxxx comes from another planet than The Love Below. On SR3MM, Discs One, Two, and Three are all hanging out on the same street corner. There are plenty of interesting moments. But it would have been nice to go on a journey". Similarly, Tom Breihan of Stereogum concluded that SR3MM "stands as a misguided experiment, a too-long indulgence from a group that thrives on concision and immediacy". Jordan Sargent of Spin believed that SR3MM "sports some of the duo's best ever songs", adding the thought that "it feels hypnotic and bewitching, the conjuring of a spell". Sheldon Pearce of Pitchfork stated that SR3MM "is the strongest of the three albums, further proving that the pair work best as a unit".

=== Swaecation ===
Online publication Highsnobiety complimented Swae Lee's vocals and production, stating "the album's more melodic beats are where Swae's latest manifestation is heard clearest" and adding that Swaecation is "a tender passion project that allows one of hip-hop's most melodically gifted stars to explore outside the familiar template that has brought him success thus far. Simply put, Swae Lee has delivered his most earnest and wholesomely candid work to date".

=== Jxmtro ===
Comparing Jxmtro to Swaecation, Sheldon Pearce of Pitchfork wrote that "While Swae's blend of pop, R&B, and dancehall is more daring, Jxmmi's Jxmtro is more consistent and reveals more of himself as an artist and person. As the more introverted (and less celebrated) of the two brothers, Jxmmi uses his opportunity to rap with fluidity, putting his ideas first for a change, rapping about growing up, outgrowing friends, and prioritizing". Calum Slingerland of Exclaim! considered Jxmtro as "a less adventurous outing, but Jxmmi shows marked improvement in his own technique".

=== Year-end lists ===
Select year-end rankings of SR3MM
Publication	List	Rank	Ref.
Billboard	50 Best Albums of 2018	50	
Complex	50 Best Albums of 2018	30	
Rolling Stone	50 Best Albums of 2018	25	

== Commercial performance ==
SR3MM debuted at number six on the US Billboard 200, with 57,000 album-equivalent units in its first week. On October 26, 2018, the album was certified gold by the Recording Industry Association of America (RIAA) for combined sales and streams in excess of 500,000 units in the United States.

== Track listing ==
Rae Sremmurd – SR3MM track listing
No.	Title	Writer(s)	Producer(s)	Length
1.	"Up in My Cocina"	Aaquil Brown; Khalif Brown; Asheton Hogan; Michael Williams	Pluss; Mike Will Made It	4:06
2.	"Close" (featuring Travis Scott)	A. Brown; K. Brown; Jacques Webster; Samuel Gloade; M. Williams	30 Roc; Mike Will Made It	3:13
3.	"Bedtime Stories" (featuring the Weeknd)	A. Brown; K. Brown; Abel Tesfaye; Marquel Middlebrooks; M. Williams	Marz; Mike Will Made It	4:52
4.	"Perplexing Pegasus"	A. Brown; K. Brown; M. Williams; Justin Garner; Reginald Smith	Mike Will Made It; J-Bo; Kent Lucciano	3:24
5.	"Buckets" (featuring Future)	A. Brown; K. Brown; Nayvadius Wilburn; Middlebrooks; M. Williams	Marz; Mike Will Made It	4:41
6.	"'42'"	A. Brown; K. Brown; Jermarcus Jackson; Diego Avendaño	D-Jay Sremm; Diego Ave	3:58
7.	"Powerglide" (featuring Juicy J)	A. Brown; K. Brown; Jordan Houston; Jamal Rashid; Jean-Marie Hovart; M. Williams	Mally Mall; Hovart; Mike Will Made It	5:32
8.	"Rock n Roll Hall of Fame"	A. Brown; K. Brown; Bryan Simmons	TM88; MP808^{[a]}	4:26
9.	"T'd Up"	A. Brown; K. Brown; Darrell Jackson; Leland Wayne	Metro Boomin; Chopsquad DJ; Swae Lee	3:52
Total length:				38:04

Swae Lee – Swaecation track listing
No.	Title	Writer(s)	Producer(s)	Length
1.	"Touchscreen Navigation"	K. Brown; Andre Robertson; Trevor Slade; Daniel Cartisano; Harry Edwards	Bizness Boi; Singawd; Daniel + Harry	3:17
2.	"Heartbreak in Encino Hills"	K. Brown; Rashid; Oluwaseyi Agbeti	Scorp Dezel; Mally Mall	4:13
3.	"Heat of the Moment"	K. Brown; D. Jackson	Chopsquad DJ	3:37
4.	"Offshore" (featuring Young Thug)	K. Brown; Jeffery Williams; Middlebrooks; M. Williams	Marz; Mike Will Made It; Cardiak^{[a]}	5:28
5.	"Guatemala" (with Slim Jxmmi)	A. Brown; K. Brown; Rashid; Akintude Akinwande; Karl Rubin	Mally Mall; TuneDaRula; Rubin	4:16
6.	"Lost Angels"	K. Brown; Robertson; Christopher Lamb; Christian Patey	Bizness Boi	3:24
7.	"Hurt to Look"	K. Brown; Robertson; Adeyinka Bankole-Ojo; Eyobed Getachew	Bizness Boi; Fwdslxsh; EY	4:16
8.	"Red Wine"	K. Brown; Ryan Martinez; Sean Seaton	G. Ry; Neenyo	2:28
9.	"What's in Your Heart?"	K. Brown; Robertson; R. Montreal	Bizness Boi; Fortune; Cardiak^{[a]}	4:14
Total length:				35:13

Slim Jxmmi – Jxmtro track listing
No.	Title	Writer(s)	Producer(s)	Length
1.	"Brxnks Truck"	A. Brown; M. Williams; Garner	Mike Will Made It; J-Bo	2:29
2.	"Players Club"	A. Brown; Garrett Lloyd; Tyler Langley	G. Lo; TL on the Beat	2:08
3.	"Anti-Social Smokers Club" (featuring Zoë Kravitz)	A. Brown; Zoë Kravitz; Hogan; M. Williams	Pluss; Mike Will Made It	2:43
4.	"Chanel" (with Swae Lee featuring Pharrell)	A. Brown; K. Brown; Pharrell Williams; Gloade; M. Williams	30 Roc; Mike Will Made It	4:24
5.	"Cap" (featuring Trouble)	A. Brown; Mariel Orr; Gloade; M. Williams	30 Roc; Mike Will Made It	3:12
6.	"Changed Up"	A. Brown; M. Williams; Charles Singleton	Mike Will Made It; Ducko McFli	3:28
7.	"Keep God First"	A. Brown; Adam Feeney; Brian Anamayatana; Milan Modi	Frank Dukes; Kilo Keyz; Yung Lan	3:41
8.	"Juggling Biddies" (featuring Riff 3x)	A. Brown; Willis Jenkins; Xavier Dotson	Zaytoven	2:48
9.	"Growed Up"	A. Brown; Middlebrooks; M. Williams	Marz; Mike Will Made It; DJ Pain 1^{[a]}	3:20
Total length:				28:13

Notes

- ^{^[a]} signifies an uncredited co-producer
- "Buckets" was originally titled "Buckets (Balling)"

Sample credits

- "Powerglide" contains samples from "Side 2 Side", performed by Three 6 Mafia.

== Personnel ==
Credits adapted from Tidal.

=== SR3MM ===
Technical

- Steve Hybicki – mixing (tracks 1, 8)
- Jaycen Joshua – mixing (tracks 2, 3, 5–7, 9)
- Randy Lanphear – mixing (tracks 4)
- Mike Will Made It – mixing (track 7)

=== Swaecation ===
Technical

- Jaycen Joshua – mixing (tracks 1, 2, 4, 6–9)
- Steve Hybicki – mixing (track 3)
- Mike Will Made It – mixing (track 7)
- Randy Lanphear – mixing (track 5)

=== Jxmtro ===
Technical

- Mike Will Made It – mixing (track 1)
- Steve Hybicki – mixing (tracks 1–3, 5, 6, 8, 9)
- Randy Lanphear – mixing (track 7)

== Charts ==
=== Weekly charts ===
Chart performance for SR3MM
Chart (2018)	Peak position
Australian Albums (ARIA)	37
Belgian Albums (Ultratop Flanders)	87
Belgian Albums (Ultratop Wallonia)	107
Canadian Albums (Billboard)	4
Danish Albums (Hitlisten)	37
Dutch Albums (Album Top 100)	17
Finnish Albums (Suomen virallinen lista)	26
German Albums (Offizielle Top 100)	61
Irish Albums (IRMA)	23
New Zealand Albums (RMNZ)	40
Norwegian Albums (VG-lista)	23
Swiss Albums (Schweizer Hitparade)	35
UK Albums (Official Charts)	33
US Billboard 200	6
US Top R&B/Hip-Hop Albums (Billboard)	5

=== Year-end charts ===
2018 year-end chart performance for SR3MM
Chart (2018)	Position
US Billboard 200	116
US Top R&B/Hip-Hop Albums (Billboard)	53

== Certifications ==
Certifications for SR3MM
Region	Certification	Certified units/sales
Canada (Music Canada)	Gold	40,000^{‡}
United States (RIAA)	Platinum	1,000,000^{‡}
^{‡} Sales+streaming figures based on certification alone.
