= Something New (Wiz Khalifa song) =

Single by Wiz Khalifa featuring Ty Dolla Sign

from the album Rolling Papers 2
- Released: August 11, 2017
- Recorded: 2017
- Genre: Hip hop; R&B
- Length: 3:20
- Label: Atlantic
- Songwriters: Cameron Thomaz; Tyrone Griffin, Jr.; Christian Ward; Austin Owens; James Foye III; Floyd "A1" Bentley
- Producers: Ayo N Keyz; Hitmaka; A1

Wiz Khalifa singles chronology
| "Gang Up" (2017) | "Something New" (2017) | "Type of Shit" (2017) |

Ty Dolla Sign singles chronology
| "Love U Better" (2017) | "Something New" (2017) | "Ego" (2017) |

"Something New" is a song by American rapper Wiz Khalifa, featuring American singer and Taylor Gang label mate Ty Dolla Sign for his sixth studio album Rolling Papers 2 (2018). It was released for digital download on August 11, 2017, by Atlantic Records as the album's lead single. It was produced by Ayo N Keyz along with Hitmaka and Floyd "A1" Bentley. It heavily samples Zapp's 1986 single "Computer Love". The song experienced a resurgence in popularity in 2020 due to its usage on TikTok.

== Background ==
Wiz and Ty previewed the song and clips of the music video several times on Instagram throughout July 2017.

== Composition ==
"Something New" is a "feel-good love song" featuring smooth, sultry vocals and a rhythmic chorus from Ty Dolla $ign.

== Commercial performance ==
"Something New" was the most added song to mainstream urban contemporary radio upon its release.

== TikTok dance challenge ==
In early 2020, the song began going viral on video-sharing app TikTok, due to a dance challenge. The challenge sees participants line up behind each other, with one person in front to kick off the dance, and everyone else then proceeding to push each elbow out to the side before shimmying along to the song's chorus and then clapping along to the beat.

== Music video ==
On August 14, 2017, Wiz uploaded the official music video for "Something New". At the start of the music video, singer Demi Lovato appears in greeting Ty Dolla $ign. Some other celebrities in the video are Jamie Foxx, Jason Derulo, O.T. Genasis, Juicy J, Lil Dicky, G-Eazy, Chuck Liddell, and Todd Gurley.

== Charts ==
| Chart (2017–2018) | Peak position |
|---|---|
| Canada Hot 100 (Billboard) | 94 |
| Hungary (Single Top 40) | 34 |
| US Billboard Hot 100 | 92 |
| US Hot R&B/Hip-Hop Songs (Billboard) | 37 |
| US R&B/Hip-Hop Airplay (Billboard) | 18 |
| US Rhythmic Airplay (Billboard) | 24 |

== Certifications ==
| Region | Certification | Certified units/sales |
|---|---|---|
| United States (RIAA) | Platinum | 1,000,000^{‡} |
^{‡} Sales+streaming figures based on certification alone.

== Release history ==
| Country | Date | Format | Label |
|---|---|---|---|
| United States | August 11, 2017 | Digital download | Taylor Gang; Atlantic |
| United States | August 22, 2017 | Urban radio | Taylor Gang; Atlantic |
