= T-Wayne =

American rapper

- Also known as: Rickey Wayne
- Born: Tyshon Dwayne Nobles; October 27, 1990 (age 35); Abilene, Texas
- Origin: Houston, Texas
- Genres: Southern hip-hop
- Occupations: Rapper; comedian; Internet personality
- Instrument: Vocals
- Years active: 2006–present
- Labels: 300; We Run It; 1017

Tyshon Dwayne Nobles (born October 27, 1990), better known by his stage name T-Wayne, is an American rapper from Houston, Texas. His rap name is a combination of his first name and his middle name. He has also occasionally taken the pseudonym Rickey Wayne, amid concerns that his name resembles those of rappers T-Pain and Lil Wayne. He is best known for his 2015 single "Nasty Freestyle" which peaked at number nine on the US Billboard Hot 100. He also performed at the 2015 BET Awards.

== Early life ==
Born in Abilene, he moved to Dallas at age 15, then to Houston at 19, where he lives.

== Breakthrough ==
On May 4, 2015, T-Wayne released his first single, "Nasty Freestyle". It peaked at number nine on the US Billboard Hot 100 in May 2015. The song also entered the UK Singles Chart at number 99, peaking at number 41.

== Discography ==
=== Mixtapes ===
- Who Is Rickey Wayne? (2015)
- Who Is Rickey Wayne 2 (2015)
- Forever Rickey (2017)

=== Singles ===
==== As lead artist ====
Title	Year	Peak chart positions									Certifications	Album
Title	Year	US	AUS	CAN	DEN	GER	NL	NZ	SWE	UK	Certifications	Album
"Nasty Freestyle"	2015	9	37	25	10	85	74	37	41	41	RIAA: Platinum; BPI: Silver; IFPI DEN: Gold	Non-album single
"I Be Killin It"	2015	—	—	—	—	—	—	—	—	—		Who Is Rickey Wayne 2
"Swing My Arms"	2016	—	—	—	—	—	—	—	—	—		Non-album singles
"Be Ok"	2016	—	—	—	—	—	—	—	—	—		Non-album singles
"Fell In Love"	2017	—	—	—	—	—	—	—	—	—		Non-album singles
"Rockstar Sh*t" (with Borgore)	2021	—	—	—	—	—	—	—	—	—		Non-album singles
"—" denotes a recording that did not chart or was not released.

==== As featuring artist ====
Title	Year	Album
"Ultimate" (Riot Ten and Shaquille O'Neal featuring T-Wayne)	2020	Non-album single
