= 30 Roc =

American musical artist

- Also known as: 30; You a Fool for This One
- Born: Samuel Jordon Gloade; 1993 (age 32–33); Bronx, New York, U.S.
- Genres: Hip hop; trap; R&B
- Occupations: Record producer; songwriter
- Years active: 2014–present
- Label: EarDrummers
- Website: iam30roc.com

Samuel Jordon Gloade, known professionally as 30 Roc, is an American record producer and songwriter. He began his career in 2014 as an in-house producer for Mike Will Made It's EarDrummers Records, but has since expanded into solo production work for several prominent music industry artists. He has been credited on the Billboard Hot 100-number one single "The Box" by Roddy Ricch; the top ten singles "Nasty Freestyle" by T-Wayne, "Rake It Up" by Yo Gotti, and "Stargazing" by Travis Scott; and the top 40 singles "Bartier Cardi" by Cardi B, "King's Dead" by Jay Rock, and "Off the Grid" by Kanye West.

== Early life ==
Samuel Gloade was born in the borough of The Bronx in New York City. He met American record producer Mike Will Made It through his rap duo Rae Sremmurd on Twitter. He later signed to the former's record label EarDrummers Records.

== Career ==
His most notable productions include T-Wayne's "Nasty Freestyle", "Rake It Up" by Yo Gotti featuring Nicki Minaj, Cardi B's hit single, "Bartier Cardi", which features 21 Savage, "Rock" by Plies, and "King's Dead" which was performed by Jay Rock, Kendrick Lamar, Future and James Blake. 30 Roc also produced Roddy Ricch's number 1 hit, "The Box", which reached the pole position of the Billboard Hot 100 in January 2020. He also helped produce the intro track of Travis Scott's Astroworld, "Stargazing", peaking at number eight on the Hot 100 in 2018. Gloade was also an executive producer for Lil Yachty's second studio album, Lil Boat 2. He served as a producer for Baby Keem and Kendrick Lamar's “Range Brothers”, a single from the former's debut studio album, The Melodic Blue.

== Production discography ==
=== Charted songs ===
Title	Year	Peak chart positions						Album
Title	Year	US	US R&B/HH	AUS	CAN	IRE	UK	Album
"Nasty Freestyle" (T-Wayne)	2015	9	4	37	25	65	41	Non-album single
"Peek a Boo" (Lil Yachty featuring Migos)	2017	78	33	—	73	—	—	Teenage Emotions
"Rake It Up" (Yo Gotti featuring Nicki Minaj)	2017	8	5	124	49	—	—	I Still Am
"Rock" (Plies)	2017	95	40	—	—	—	—	Ain't No Mixtape Bih 3
"Bartier Cardi" (Cardi B featuring 21 Savage)	2017	14	7	77	18	51	40	Invasion of Privacy
"King's Dead" (Jay Rock, Kendrick Lamar, James Blake and Future)	2018	21	13	58	23	51	50	Black Panther: The Album and Redemption
"Boom!" (Lil Yachty featuring Ugly God)	2018	88	43	—	—	—	—	Lil Boat 2
"Gucci Flip Flops" (Bhad Bhabie featuring Lil Yachty)	2018	79	39	—	62	—	—	15
"Close" (Rae Sremmurd featuring Travis Scott)	2018	98	48	—	71	—	—	SR3MM
"Stargazing" (Travis Scott)	2018	8	7	10	7	12	15	Astroworld
"Who? What!" (Travis Scott featuring Quavo and Takeoff)	2018	43	26	—	41	—	—	Astroworld
"Biggest Alley Oop" (Quavo)	2018	86	40	—	69	—	—	Quavo Huncho
"The Box" (Roddy Ricch)	2020	1	1	4	1	2	2	Please Excuse Me for Being Antisocial
"T.D" (Lil Yachty and Tierra Whack featuring Tyler, the Creator and ASAP Rocky)	2020	83	34	—	—	—	—	Lil Boat 3
"What That Speed Bout!?" (Mike Will Made It, Nicki Minaj and YoungBoy Never Broke Again)	2020	35	11	—	76	—	—	Michael

== See also ==
- EarDrummers Records
