= Swae Lee =

American rapper and singer (born 1993)

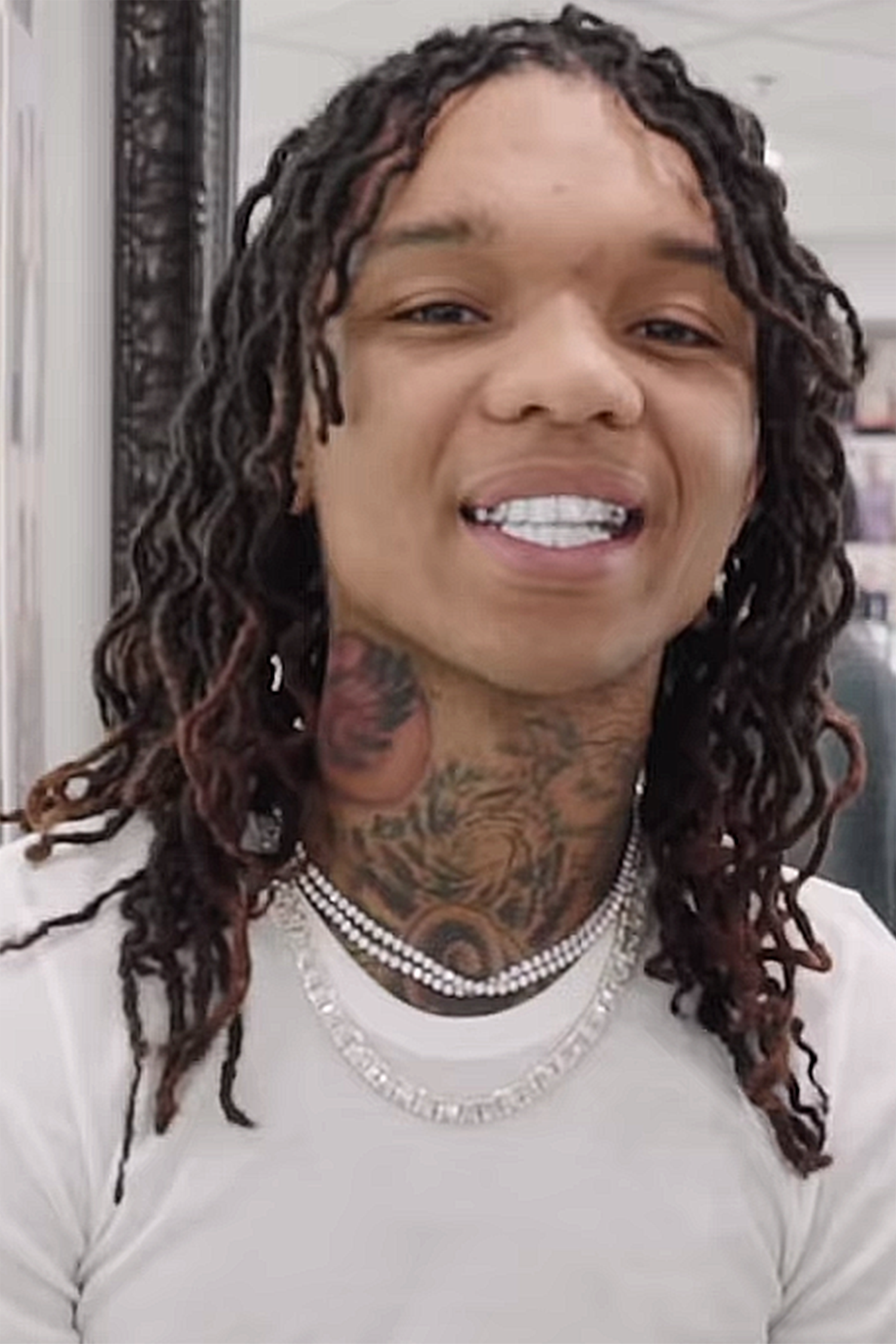
- Lee in 2019

Background information
- Also known as: Kid Krunk; Kid the Great; iHipster Lee
- Born: Khalif Malik Ibn Shaman Brown; June 7, 1993 (age 33); Inglewood, California, U.S.
- Origin: Tupelo, Mississippi, U.S.
- Genres: Pop rap; trap; pop
- Occupations: Rapper; singer
- Works: Swae Lee discography
- Years active: 2010–present
- Labels: EarDrummers; Interscope; SremmLife Crew
- Member of: Rae Sremmurd
- Children: 2
- Website: swaeleeofficial.com

Khalif Malik Ibn Shaman Brown (born June 7, 1993), known professionally as Swae Lee, is an American rapper and singer from Inglewood, California. Known for his wide-ranged, reverb-heavy vocals and genre-blending, Lee is one half of the Mississippi-based hip-hop duo Rae Sremmurd, which he formed in 2010 with his older brother Slim Jxmmi.

Rae Sremmurd signed with Mike Will Made It's EarDrummer Records, an imprint of Interscope Records in 2013. The duo's first three studio albums — SremmLife (2015), SremmLife 2 (2016) and SR3MM (2018) — debuted within the top ten of the Billboard 200, and spawned hit songs including "No Flex Zone," "No Type," and "Black Beatles" (featuring Gucci Mane)—the latter of which topped the Billboard Hot 100. As a solo act, he guest appeared on French Montana's 2017 single "Unforgettable," which peaked within the latter chart's top ten—becoming his first song to do so as a solo artist—and received diamond certification by the Recording Industry Association of America (RIAA). Later that year, he received a Grammy Award nomination for co-writing Beyoncé's single "Formation."

In 2018, Lee released his debut solo studio album, Swaecation, as part of Rae Sremmurd's third album, SR3MM (2018)—a triple album. That same year, his single "Sunflower" (with Post Malone) was released for the accompanying soundtrack to the film Spider-Man: Into the Spider-Verse (2018). The song peaked atop the Billboard Hot 100, received two Grammy Award nominations, and became the highest-certified song in RIAA history; the first to receive double diamond (20× platinum) certification. Also in 2018, he released the single "Close to Me" (with Ellie Goulding and Diplo)—a top 40 US hit with double platinum certification—and made an uncredited guest appearance on Travis Scott's single "Sicko Mode", which became his second song to top the Billboard Hot 100 and likewise earned two Grammy nominations. His 2020 single, "Be Like That" (with Kane Brown and Khalid) reached the top 20 of the chart and received quadruple platinum certification by the RIAA.

Lee released his second solo album Same Difference on April 4, 2026.

== Early life ==
Khalif Malik Ibn Shaman Brown was born on June 7, 1993, in Inglewood, California, to a single mother who worked on tanks in the United States Army. Lee was raised in Tupelo, Mississippi, and began to make music in high school with his brother Slim Jxmmi and local rapper Lil Pantz as "Dem Outta St8 Boyz". After graduating high school, Lee, alongside his brother, had a period of homelessness in which they squatted in an abandoned house.

== Career ==
In 2013, he and Slim Jxmmi signed to Mike Will Made It's label EarDrummers Entertainment as Rae Sremmurd. They have since released three studio albums under EarDrummers, SremmLife, SremmLife 2, and SR3MM.

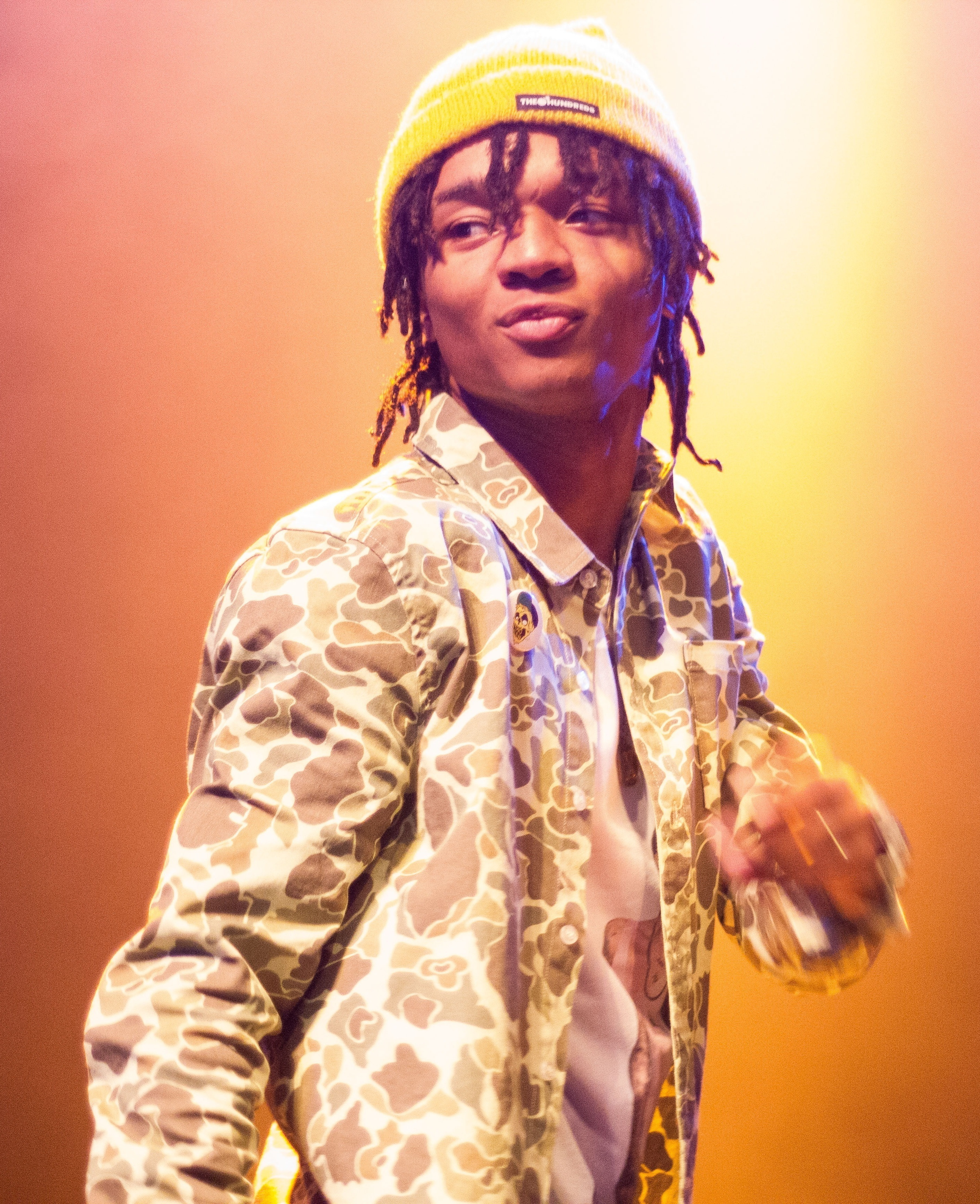
Lee in 2015

In March 2015, Lee was featured on Mike Will Made It's "Drinks on Us", which also featured artists Future and The Weeknd, and became his first single as solo artist. In September 2015, he was featured on Wiz Khalifa's "Burn Slow", which peaked at number 83 on the Billboard Hot 100, making it Lee's first solo entry on the chart.

In April 2017, Lee was featured on French Montana's "Unforgettable". The song peaked at number three on the Billboard Hot 100, making it Lee's first top ten single on the chart as a solo artist. In September 2018, Jhené Aiko featured Lee on her track "Sativa". Two months later, Lee released a song titled "TR666" alongside Trippie Redd. On May 4, 2018, almost two years after its initial announcement in August 2016, Lee released his debut solo album, Swaecation as a part of a triple album set, which also contained Rae Sremmurd's third studio album, SR3MM and Slim Jxmmi's debut studio album as a solo artist, Jxmtro. In October 2018, he featured on the song "Close to Me" by Ellie Goulding and Diplo. Lee also collaborated on XXXTentacion's song "Arms Around You" after his death, along with Lil Pump and Maluma. On October 18, 2018, Lee featured on Post Malone's song "Sunflower" for Spider-Man: Into the Spider-Verse, which became Malone's third and Lee's first song as a soloist to top the Billboard Hot 100. He appeared on Nicki Minaj's 2018 album Queen.

In May 2019, he collaborated on the song "Crave" with Madonna on her album Madame X. In August 2019, Lee released "Won't Be Late" featuring Canadian rapper Drake, produced by Tekno and Mike Will Made It. In October 2019, he was featured on 88rising's "Walking", alongside Joji, Jackson Wang, and Major Lazer. In 2020, he released the single "Someone Said", based on his feature on Travis Scott's "Sicko Mode". He also collaborated with Chloe x Halle on the Mike Will Made It-produced "Catch Up", from the former's album Ungodly Hour. He was featured on the remix to Arizona Zervas' hit song "Roxanne". On June 18, 2020, Lee released the single, "Reality Check".

Lee invested in esports organization XSET in October 2020. Lee has been working on his upcoming album, originally titled Human Nature, since 2020. In the same year, he appeared on Pop Smoke’s posthumous album Shoot for the Stars, Aim for the Moon. In 2021, he collaborated with Alicia Keys on the single "Lala" at the 2021 MTV Video Music Awards. In February 2026, Lee announced his second solo album, Same Difference, would be released on April 4, 2026, and released its lead single, "Flammable".

== Artistry ==
Lee has become known for his hooks and melodies, as demonstrated in collaborations with the likes of Madonna, Ellie Goulding, Anitta, French Montana, and Post Malone, among other artists. He has been described as 'the songbird of our generation', with several of his peers and critics praising his vocal ability. According to a 2017 interview with A Polaroid Story, Lee describes himself more as a singer than a rapper.

== Personal life ==
In April 2019, Lee's home was raided by the California Department of Fish and Wildlife for possession of exotic animals, during which his pet spider monkey was seized.

In January 2020, Lee's stepfather Floyd Sullivan was shot and killed. Michael Sullivan, Lee's half-brother, was taken into police custody as the suspected perpetrator. Michael Sullivan pleaded guilty to second degree murder in October 2023.

Lee's first child, a daughter with Brazilian model Aline Martins, was born in 2020. In 2022, he filed for joint custody. That same year, he had a son with girlfriend Victoria Kristine.

Lee has attention deficit hyperactivity disorder (ADHD), and released a song as part of Rae Sremmurd in tribute to the neurotype in 2023—"ADHD Anthem (Too Many Emotions)".

In July 2024, Lee expressed disapproval of Vice President Kamala Harris, and urged his fans on X to not vote for her in the 2024 United States presidential election.

== Discography ==
- Swaecation (2018)
- Same Difference (2026)

== Awards and nominations ==
=== Grammy Awards ===
Year	Nominee / work	Award	Result	Ref.
2017	"Formation" (as songwriter)	Song of the Year	Nominated	
2019	"Sicko Mode" (with Travis Scott, Drake, and Big Hawk)	Best Rap Performance	Nominated	
2019	"Sicko Mode" (with Travis Scott, Drake, and Big Hawk)	Best Rap Song	Nominated	
2020	"Sunflower" (with Post Malone)	Record of the Year	Nominated	
2020	"Sunflower" (with Post Malone)	Best Pop Duo/Group Performance	Nominated	

=== MTVU Woodie Awards ===
Year	Nominee / work	Award	Result	Ref.
2017	Swae Lee	Songwriter of the Year	Nominated	

=== Soul Train Music Awards ===
Year	Nominee / work	Award	Result	Ref.
2016	"Formation" (as songwriter)	The Ashford & Simpson Songwriter's Award	Nominated	

=== Teen Choice Awards ===
Year	Nominee / work	Award	Result	Ref.
2019	"Sunflower" (with Post Malone)	Choice R&B/Hip-Hop Song	Nominated	
2019	"Sunflower" (with Post Malone)	Choice Song From a Movie	Nominated	
