= Formation (song) =

Single by Beyoncé

from the album Lemonade
- Released: February 6, 2016
- Studio: Quad Recording, New York City
- Genre: Trap; bounce
- Length: 3:26
- Label: Parkwood; Columbia
- Songwriters: Beyoncé Knowles; Khalif Brown; Asheton Hogan; Michael Len Williams II
- Producers: Beyoncé; Mike Will Made It

Beyoncé singles chronology
"Runnin' (Lose It All)" (2015)	"Formation" (2016)	"Sorry" (2016)

Music video
- "Formation" on YouTube

"Formation" is a song by American singer and songwriter Beyoncé from her sixth studio album, Lemonade (2016). Beyoncé wrote and produced the song with Mike Will Made It, with Swae Lee and Pluss as co-writers. Pluss formulated the song's original beat while Swae Lee freestyled the hook, after which Beyoncé's wrote its verses. The song was surprise-released on February 6, 2016, through Parkwood Entertainment. It is a trap and bounce song in which Beyoncé celebrates her culture, identity, and success as a black woman from the Southern United States.

The song received widespread acclaim upon release, with music critics praising it as a personal and political ode to black Southern identity. It was voted critics' top song of 2016 in The Village Voice's Pazz & Jop poll and named one of the best songs of the 2010s decade by numerous publications. In 2021, Rolling Stone placed the song at number 73 on its 500 Greatest Songs of All Time list. "Formation" won all six of its nominations at the 2016 MTV Video Music Awards and received three nominations at the 59th Annual Grammy Awards: Record of the Year, Song of the Year, and Best Music Video, winning the lattermost award. In the United States, the song debuted at number 10 on the Billboard Hot 100 and was certified three-times platinum by the Recording Industry Association of America. It also charted within the top 40 in Australia, Canada, France, Hungary, Scotland, Spain, and the United Kingdom, and the song was certified diamond in Brazil, double platinum in Australia, and platinum in Canada and New Zealand.

The song's music video premiered on the same day as the song itself as an unlisted video on YouTube. Directed by Melina Matsoukas, the New Orleans-set video portrays black pride and resilience through diverse depictions of black Southern culture. The video received critical acclaim, with Rolling Stone placing it at number one on its 100 Greatest Music Videos of All Time list in 2021. Beyoncé performed the song during her guest appearance at the Super Bowl 50 halftime show the day after its release, and it has featured on the setlists of her subsequent tours.

Upon release, "Formation" ignited discussions on the topics of culture, racism, and politics. The song also triggered controversy, with conservative figures claiming that Beyoncé was spreading anti-police and anti-American messages, and law enforcement officers protested at her concerts. It became known as a protest song and was adopted as an anthem by the Black Lives Matter movement and the 2017 Women's March. The song has also been the subject of study at schools, colleges, and universities.

== Writing and production ==
"Formation" was written by Beyoncé, Mike Will Made It, Swae Lee and Pluss, and produced by Beyoncé and Mike Will. Pluss formulated the original beat for the song in Atlanta, Georgia, implementing a synthesizer effect found in the Virtual Studio Technology plug-in on FL Studio. In April 2014, Mike Will and the members of Rae Sremmund were driving to Coachella and freestyling to beats in the car. For the beat that Pluss made, Swae Lee said: "Okay ladies, now let's get in formation." Will loved the concept and thought it would be suited to Beyoncé, who had recently asked him to send new music ideas. Will believed it could be a huge female empowerment anthem in the same vein as Beyoncé's 2008 song "Single Ladies (Put a Ring on It)", with the track being about women getting in line with the men they are in relationships with. They recorded the line on a voice note and later played it back when in a recording studio in Los Angeles. Lee recorded a simple reference track, freestyling over the beat. Mike Will sent it to Beyoncé, together with five or six other reference tracks. A few months later, Mike Will was at a party after a basketball game. Beyoncé appeared at the party and told him she really liked the "Formation" idea, and left it at that.

Beyoncé then wrote all of the verses of the song in New York, while keeping the central hook about ladies getting in formation. Beyoncé's verses took the song in a different direction from what Will intended and broadened its scope to turn it into an anthem about her identity, heritage, and culture. Jon Platt of Warner Chappell Music told Mike Will: "Yo, this shit's crazy, you got to hear this." Will went to New York and spent a week with Beyoncé in Quad Recording Studios to complete the recording and production. They added heavy, distorted 808 beats with saturated upper harmonics to the track to make it "palatable to the culture", according to mixing engineer Jaycen Joshua. Beyoncé thought it could be a song that marching bands would play and asked for horns to be added to the track to evoke the sounds of New Orleans. Will explained that Beyoncé "took this one little idea we came up with on the way to Coachella, put it in a pot, stirred it up, and came with this smash. She takes ideas and puts them with her own ideas, and makes this masterpiece."

== Composition and lyrics ==
"Formation" is a Houston trap and New Orleans bounce song. The song is written in the key of F minor in common time with a tempo of 123 beats per minute. It has a minimalistic beat containing rubbery synths and a heavy bass line, which transforms into a horn-infused stomp reminiscent of marching bands and military tattoos. In The Oxford Handbook of Social Media and Music Learning, Joseph Michael Abramo wrote that Beyoncé's implementation of electronic production, brass elements, and vocal fry in "Formation" acts as a tribute to the signifiers of black music, while also forming a critique of institutional racism together with the lyrics. The song has an unconventional structure that deviates from the norm of pop music. American singer-songwriter Mike Errico called the songwriting "practically Dylanesque", with no single clear chorus on the track, but instead a chorus followed by a "super-chorus" that "blows what we thought was the chorus out of the water".

Beyoncé's vocals span from D_{3} to A♭_{4} in the song. Beyoncé employs multiple delivery styles on the track, with the introduction being delivered in a hoarse, whispered tone that switches into a half-rapped, half-sung cadence as the song progresses. Lauren Chanel Allen of Teen Vogue commented that Beyoncé used "a lazy trap flow" instead of "her superhuman vocal range", which acts as a refusal to code-switch and an embracing of blackness. The Guardian's Alex Macpherson characterized Beyoncé's delivery as playful and carefree, noting the "amused drawl" of the opening line and the "sudden giddy exclamation as she lands on the word 'chaser' in the chorus". Sheldon Pearce of Pitchfork described how Beyoncé raps on the track, implementing enunciated syllables, "hard-cracking consonant sounds and precisely-measured alliteration" that make the lyrics satisfying to recite.

Lyrically, "Formation" is a celebration of Beyoncé's culture, identity, and success as a black woman from the Southern United States. Focusing on the theme of black pride, Beyoncé extols her Texan, Alabamian, and Louisianan roots and notes how she has remained closely connected to her heritage throughout her mainstream success. She reclaims offensive terms for black people ("negro" and "Bama") and applauds her and her family's physical features ("I like my baby heir with baby hair and afros" and "I like my Negro nose with Jackson 5 nostrils"). Beyoncé also references her global recognition on the track, dismissing a conspiracy theory that attributes her success to the Illuminati and celebrating self-made black businesswomen.

== Release and commercial performance ==
"Formation" was released on February 6, 2016, accompanied by its official music video. It was a surprise release, having no prior announcement in a similar manner to Beyoncé's 2013 self-titled studio album. Writers such as Dream Hampton suggested that the release date was intentionally selected, as it was the start of Black History Month, during Mardi Gras in New Orleans, the day after Trayvon Martin's birthday, and the day before Sandra Bland's birthday. The release was accompanied by new merchandise on Beyoncé's website, with items and clothing citing lyrics from the song. The release "broke the internet", according to Rolling Stone, receivingx widespread praise and discourse on social media. It was Google's most searched song of 2016.

"Formation" was not an official single, according to music industry trade publication Hits Daily Double. The song was exclusively available as a free download via the subscription-based music streaming service Tidal. It was not available for purchase or for streaming on other platforms, and Tidal did not report the song's streams to Nielsen, the source of Billboard's sales figures. The song was also not promoted to radio stations; however several stations still added it to their rotations. Reggie Rouse, program director at Atlanta station V-103, said: "If you were a mainstream urban station that didn't play 'Formation,' you were left out in the cold. When Beyoncé releases a record or a song, it's an event — everyone listens. If someone else did that, it wouldn't have the same effect." The song debuted at number 11 on the U.S. Hot R&B/Hip-Hop Airplay with 16.3 million audience impressions, marking Beyoncé's highest career debut on the chart. Based on the airplay alone, the song debuted at number nine on the U.S. Billboard Bubbling Under Hot 100.

"Formation" featured as the final track on Beyoncé's sixth studio album, Lemonade, which was surprise-released on April 23, 2016. The song also plays over the credits of the accompanying film of the same name. The track set new peak positions on the charts following the release of the album, as it became available for streaming exclusively on Tidal, as well as for purchase on iTunes two days later. The song debuted at number 10 on the Billboard Hot 100 and number three on the Digital Songs chart (with 174,000 downloads) on the chart dating May 14, 2016. In 2022, the song was certified three-times platinum by the Recording Industry Association of America in the U.S. Following the album's release, the song also debuted in the top 40 of several international singles charts, including the UK, Canada, Australia, France, Spain, Hungary, and Sweden. It reached number one on the ARIA Urban Singles chart, while the singer's own "Hold Up" was at number two.

== Critical response ==
=== Reviews ===
"Formation" was met with widespread critical acclaim upon release. Pitchfork named the song "Best New Track", with Britt Julious describing it as one of Beyoncé's "most instrumentally-dense and trend-forward productions" which is made specifically for black women, "an audience that might not receive the sort of mainstream, visually and sonically-enticing wisdom that Bey has perfected". In a review for the New Statesman, Anna Leszkiewicz praised the experimental nature of the track and wrote that Beyoncé presented "radical" sociopolitical concepts in a familial context, adding: "The more mainstream Beyoncé becomes, the more she functions as a marginal artist." Similarly, Q's Shad characterized the song's lyrics as "deeply personal and political", and praised Beyoncé for celebrating her black Southern roots on a global stage. Writing for The Guardian, Daphne A Brooks described the "brilliance of the single's sonic arc", with the tension from Beyoncé's "restrained, raspy" vocals exploding in a "euphoric release" as she expresses her pride in black identity and culture.

Omise'eke Natasha Tinsley, professor of African Studies at University of Texas at Austin, wrote for Time that "Formation" differs from contemporary political songs by celebrating the breadth and beauty of black women's lives, rather than focusing on black men's deaths. The New York Times' Jenna Wortham praised the song for its expression of black identity and wrote that it is "about the entirety of the black experience in America in 2016", encompassing topics such as beauty standards, police brutality, empowerment, and shared culture and history. In an article for The Washington Post, Regina N. Bradley wrote that the song sees Beyoncé forgoing a "more universally appealing trope of feminine blackness in favor of an experimental and boisterous black womanhood" that can voice critiques of social, political, and economic issues. A Rolling Stone journalist commented that the song "felt downright necessary" in the Black Lives Matter era, deeming it "a powerful statement of black Southern resilience".

In retrospective reviews, critics have considered "Formation" to be one of Beyoncé's best songs, noting its broader cultural importance. Rolling Stone's Robyn Mowatt described the song as "one of the 21st century's most thrilling and bracing pop music statements", as a rallying cry and call to arms with global impact. Naming it Beyoncé's greatest song, The Guardian's head rock and pop critic Alexis Petridis characterized "Formation" as "a masterpiece", citing the "adventurous" music, Beyoncé's perfect vocal performance which switches "between playfulness and determination", and the lyrics that act as "a powerful statement of black resilience". USA Today's Melissa Ruggieri described the song as one of Beyoncé's "most consequential musical creations", while Entertainment Weekly's Lester Brathwaite wrote that it "marked a seismic shift in the culture" as the "new Black national anthem". Time's Raisa Bruner wrote that the song was "flawless", as a "seminal work" that reflected sociopolitical sentiments in the U.S.

=== Recognition ===
In The Village Voice's annual Pazz & Jop mass critics poll of the year's best in music in 2016, "Formation" was ranked at number one. It was named the best song of 2016 by Rolling Stone, Time, NPR, Rolling Stone Australia, Rolling Stone Argentina, Complex, Entertainment Weekly, Fuse, Paste, The Music, Musikexpress, Aftonbladet, Idolator, Mashable, Red Bull, and PopMatters. The song was also named the best international song of 2016 by Rolling Stone Brazil, while Billboard ranked it at number one on their "10 Best R&B Songs of 2016" list.

In 2019, Essence and Parade named "Formation" the greatest song of the decade (2010s). Consequence of Sound, Paste, Insider, and Tampa Bay Times listed "Formation" as the third greatest song of the 2010s. For Pitchfork and Rolling Stone it was the fourth best of the same period. The BBC, Billboard, and GQ included "Formation" in their lists of the songs that defined and shaped the decade. Vulture included the release date of "Formation" in their list of the 103 days that shaped music in the 2010s.

The Independent included "Formation" on their list of the 40 best song lyrics of all time. i-D ranked the song at number one on their list of the greatest pop comebacks of the 21st century. In 2021, Rolling Stone placed the song at number 73 on its list of the 500 Greatest Songs of All Time.

== Accolades ==
"Formation" received three nominations at the 59th Annual Grammy Awards: Record of the Year, Song of the Year, and Best Music Video. While the song did not receive Record of the Year or Song of the Year, it received the title of Best Music Video. The song's losses in the former two categories sparked controversy, with some critics considering it a snub that demonstrates Beyoncé's lack of recognition in the General Field. The winner of the Record of the Year category Adele expressed recognition for Beyoncé in her acceptance speech, saying: "My dream and my idol is Queen Bey, and I adore you. You move my soul every single day. And you have done for nearly 17 years. I adore you, and I want you to be my mommy".

At the 2016 MTV Video Music Awards, "Formation" won all of its nominations, making Beyoncé the most awarded artist in MTV Video Music Awards history. The video's win for Video of the Year marked Beyoncé's second win in this category, tying the record for the artist with the most wins in the category in history. With the song's win for Best Pop Video, Beyoncé became the only black artist to win the award in history.

List of awards and nominations received by "Formation"
Year	Ceremony	Award	Result	Ref.
2016	AICE Awards	Best Music Video	Won	
2016	BET Awards	Video of the Year	Won	
2016	BET Awards	Viewers Choice Award	Won	
2016	BET Awards	Centric Award	Won	
2016	Camerimage Awards	Best Music Video	Nominated	
2016	Camerimage Awards	Best Cinematography in a Music Video	Nominated	
2016	Cannes Lions Awards	Excellence in Music Video – Grand Prix	Won	
2016	Clio Awards	Best Video of the Year	Won	
2016	MTV Europe Music Awards	Best Video	Nominated	
2016	MTV Video Music Awards	Video of the Year	Won	
2016	MTV Video Music Awards	Best Direction	Won	
2016	MTV Video Music Awards	Best Pop Video	Won	
2016	MTV Video Music Awards	Best Cinematography	Won	
2016	MTV Video Music Awards	Best Editing	Won	
2016	MTV Video Music Awards	Best Choreography	Won	
2016	MTV Video Music Awards Japan	Best Female Video	Nominated	
2016	Q Awards	Best Video	Nominated	
2016	Soul Train Music Awards	Video of the Year	Won	
2016	Soul Train Music Awards	Song of the Year	Won	
2016	Soul Train Music Awards	Best Dance Performance	Nominated	
2016	Soul Train Music Awards	The Ashford & Simpson Songwriter's Award	Nominated	
2016	UK Music Video Awards	Best Urban Video	Nominated	
2016	UK Music Video Awards	Best Styling in a Music Video	Won	
2016	WatsUp TV Africa Music Video Awards	Best International Video	Won	
2017	ASCAP Rhythm & Soul Award	Award Winning R&B/Hip Hop Songs	Won	
2017	Grammy Awards	Record of the Year	Nominated	
2017	Grammy Awards	Song of the Year	Nominated	
2017	Grammy Awards	Best Music Video	Won	
2017	iHeartRadio Music Awards	Best Music Video	Nominated	
2017	NAACP Image Awards	Outstanding Song	Nominated	
2017	NAACP Image Awards	Outstanding Music Video	Won	
2017	Nickelodeon Kids' Choice Awards	Favorite Music Video	Nominated	
2017	Nickelodeon Kids' Choice Awards Brazil	Best Music Clip	Nominated	
2017	NME Awards	Best Music Video	Nominated	
2017	One Show Awards	Cultural Driver Award	Won	
2017	One Show Awards	Best Music Video	Won	
2017	Webby Awards	Best Music Video	Won	

== Music video ==
=== Development ===
Beyoncé approached Melina Matsoukas to direct the music video for "Formation" a few weeks before its release. After Matsoukas agreed, Beyoncé invited Matsoukas to her house, where they discussed Beyoncé's family history, the South, and New Orleans. Matsoukas found ideas for the video following hours of research on the works of Toni Morrison, Maya Angelou, and Octavia E. Butler. Matsoukas conceived scenes featuring events from throughout black history, including slavery, the Rodney King protests, and Mardi Gras parades. Matsoukas told The New Yorker: "I wanted to show — this is black people. We triumph, we suffer, we're drowning, we're being beaten, we're dancing, we're eating, and we're still here." She wrote out a treatment at 2 am and sent it to Beyoncé at 5 or 6 am, thinking that Beyoncé would reply later in the day. However, Beyoncé responded immediately and asked to discuss it further.

Beyoncé filmed for the music video over two days. Arthur Jafa was hired as camera operator; Jafa had been the cinematographer of Daughters of the Dust, a 1991 film about Gullah women in South Carolina, whose focus on black sisterhood was an inspiration for the "Formation" video. Matsoukas wanted to create a sense of verisimilitude in the video, shooting some scenes with a camcorder and others with a Bolex camera, the latter giving the scenes a grainy look resembling documentary footage. Sets for the video included the Fenyes Estate, which was decorated to evoke a "blackified" Southern Gothic mansion, and a soundstage with an artificial lake.

=== Synopsis ===
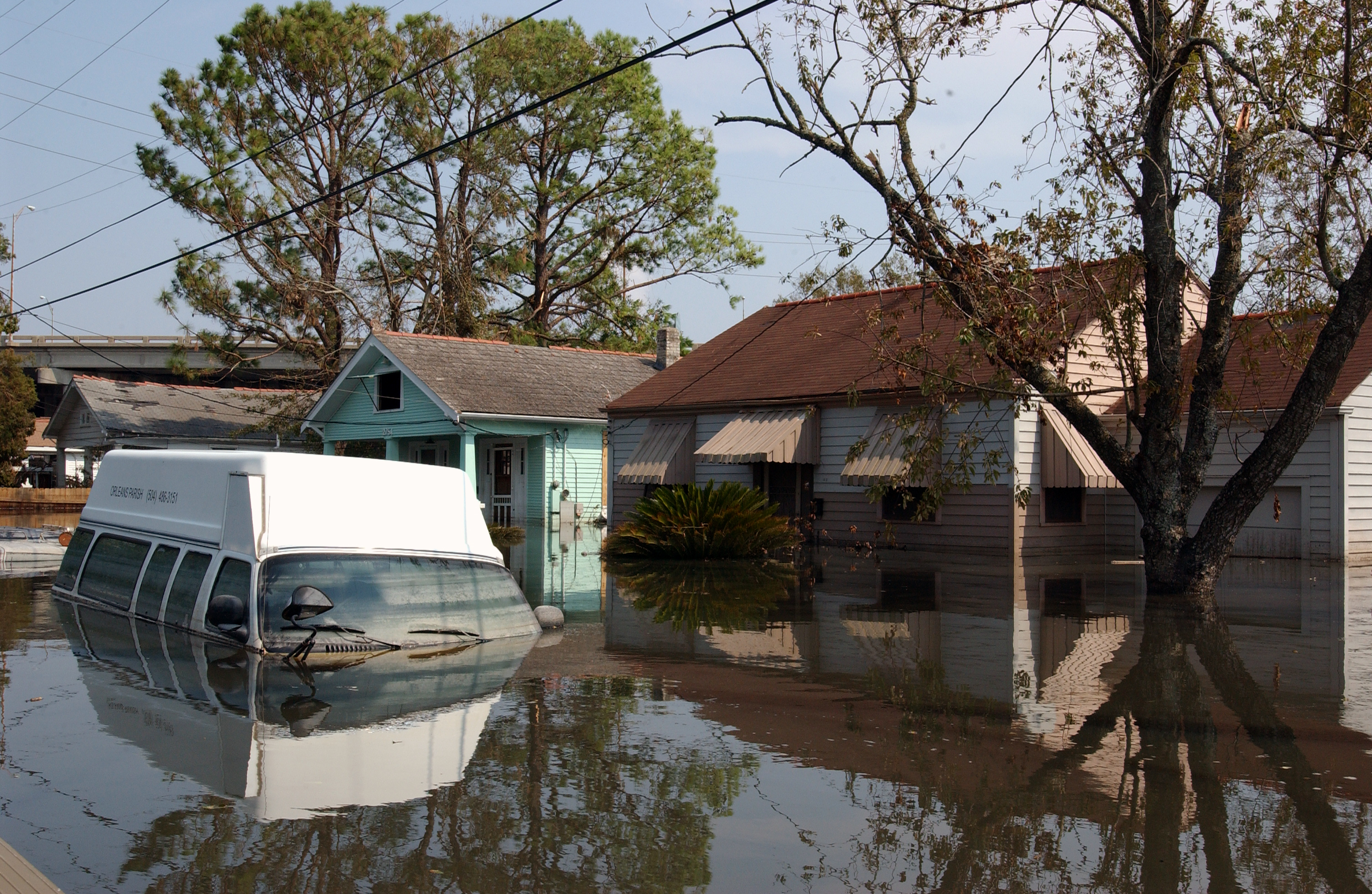
Some scenes in the video depict flooding in New Orleans following Hurricane Katrina

The music video is set in New Orleans, exploring interpretations of the city's past, present, and future in the wake of Hurricane Katrina, in turn forming a celebration of black pride and resilience. It features rapidly edited scenes that depict the variety and heterogeneity of black Southern culture. This includes Mardi Gras, black cowboys, stepping, wig shops, crawfish, cotillions, grills, black preachers, second lines, marching bands, bounce dancers, and traditional courtship and burial rituals. Beyoncé is seen embodying several archetypal Southern black women that span time, class, and space, which artist and author Ryann Donnelly viewed as being nine distinct personas that recur throughout the video. The video modifies the song to include spoken interpolations from the New Orleans bounce artist Big Freedia and YouTube personality Messy Mya, who was murdered in New Orleans in 2010.

The video begins with Beyoncé crouching on top of a New Orleans police interceptor, which gradually sinks into floodwaters as the video progresses, acting as a criticism of the government response to Hurricane Katrina. Another set of scenes portray Beyoncé as the mistress of an all-black household in a Southern plantation-style house, as a subversion and reclamation of the legacy of slavery in the South. Beyoncé and her dancers perform in an empty swimming pool in another scene, referencing the story of a recently desegregated public swimming pool in the 1950s being drained after Dorothy Dandridge dipped her toe in it. In a later scene, a man holds a newspaper featuring an image of Martin Luther King Jr. with the caption: "What is the real legacy of Dr. Martin Luther King, Jr. and why was a revolutionary recast as an acceptable Negro leader?" The last sequence depicts a young boy in a hoodie dancing in front of a line of police officers in riot gear. When the boy holds up his hands, the officers reciprocate the gesture. The video cuts to a wall graffitied with the phrase: "Stop shooting us", echoing the demand of the Black Lives Matter movement for reform in policing and criminal justice.

=== Release and reception ===
The video premiered alongside the song on Tidal on February 6, 2016. It was also uploaded as an unlisted video on Beyoncé's official YouTube channel, which prevented it from being accessed by search functionalities. The video was met with widespread acclaim from fans and critics, with The Guardian's Syreeta McFadden writing that it presents black culture in a way that has not often been seen in popular culture. Billboard named "Formation" the greatest music video of the decade in 2019, while Rolling Stone placed it at number one on their 100 Greatest Music Videos of All Time list in 2021.

== Live performances ==
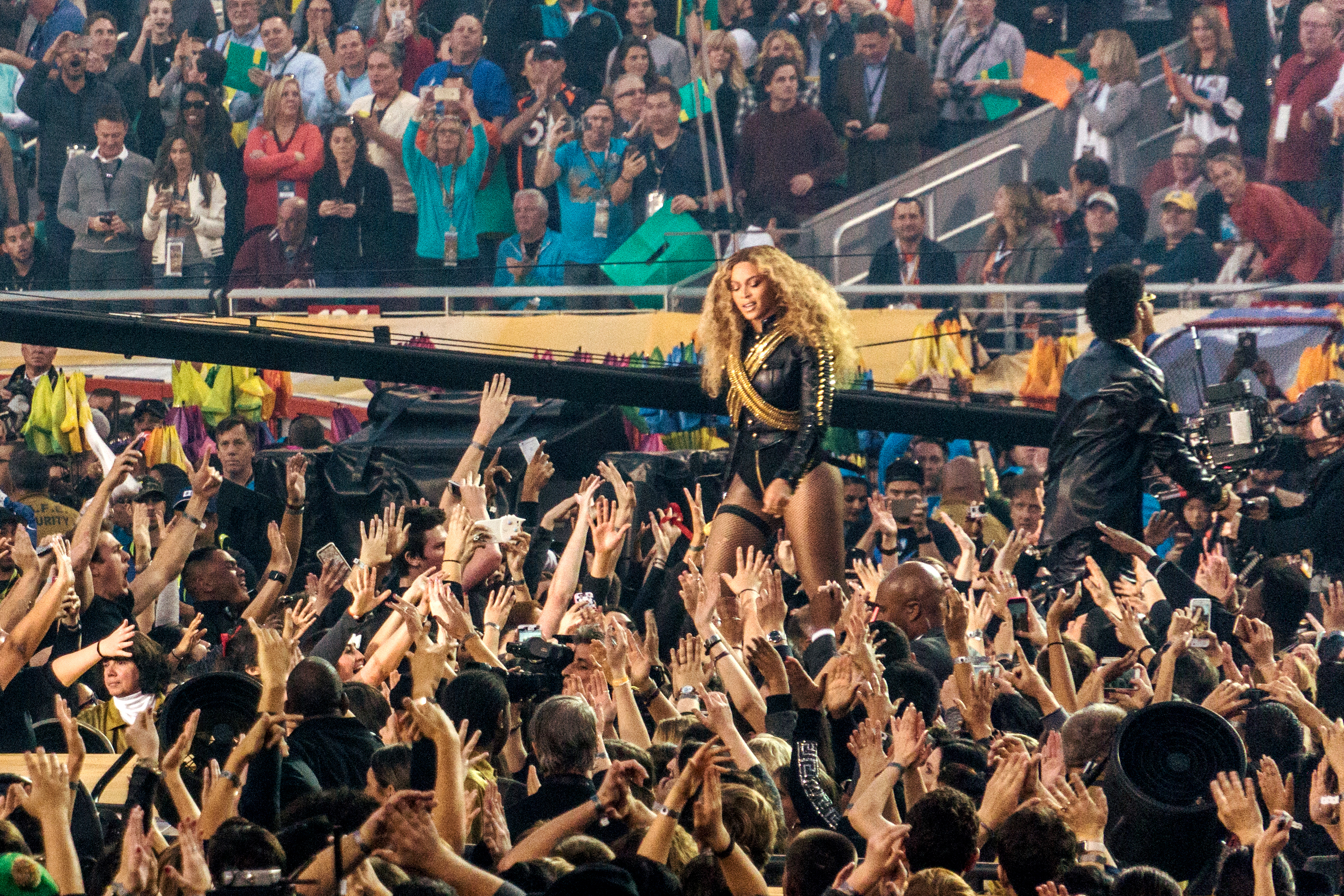
Beyoncé performing during the Super Bowl 50 halftime show

Beyoncé performed the song as part of a guest appearance during the Super Bowl 50 halftime show, which was headlined by Coldplay at the Levi's Stadium in Santa Clara, California on February 7, 2016. Her performance started after Bruno Mars finished with "Uptown Funk". She wore a black leather outfit with golden sashes, inspired by Michael Jackson's Super Bowl XXVII halftime show, while her dancers' outfits were reminiscent of the Black Panther Party. At one point, her dancers formed an 'X' formation in an apparent reference to civil rights activist Malcolm X. The performance was met with international headlines and widespread acclaim, with many critics saying she stole the show from Coldplay. The staff of Rolling Stone described the performance as "awe-inspiring", while Jon Caramanica of The New York Times wrote that Beyoncé is the only artist capable of "walking the cultural tightrope of delivering a song with such potent declarations of black pride on a stage that prefers studied neutrality".

"Formation" was the opening number on Beyoncé's Formation World Tour, which began on April 27, 2016. It was performed with the singer backed by dancers dressed in black sequined leotards and hats with wide brims. The song was also performed as part of a five-song Lemonade medley at the 2016 MTV Video Music Awards on August 28, 2016. She finished the performance with "Formation", with her dancers forming the female symbol at the end. Rolling Stone's Rob Sheffield considered the performance to be "one of the most blood-chillingly great live performances in award-show history", while Billboard named it the greatest award show performance of all time. Beyoncé performed "Formation" during a surprise set at a "Get Out the Vote" concert in support of the Hillary Clinton 2016 presidential campaign on November 4, 2016. Beyoncé and her dancers wore pantsuits, which is a piece of clothing that Clinton is known for.

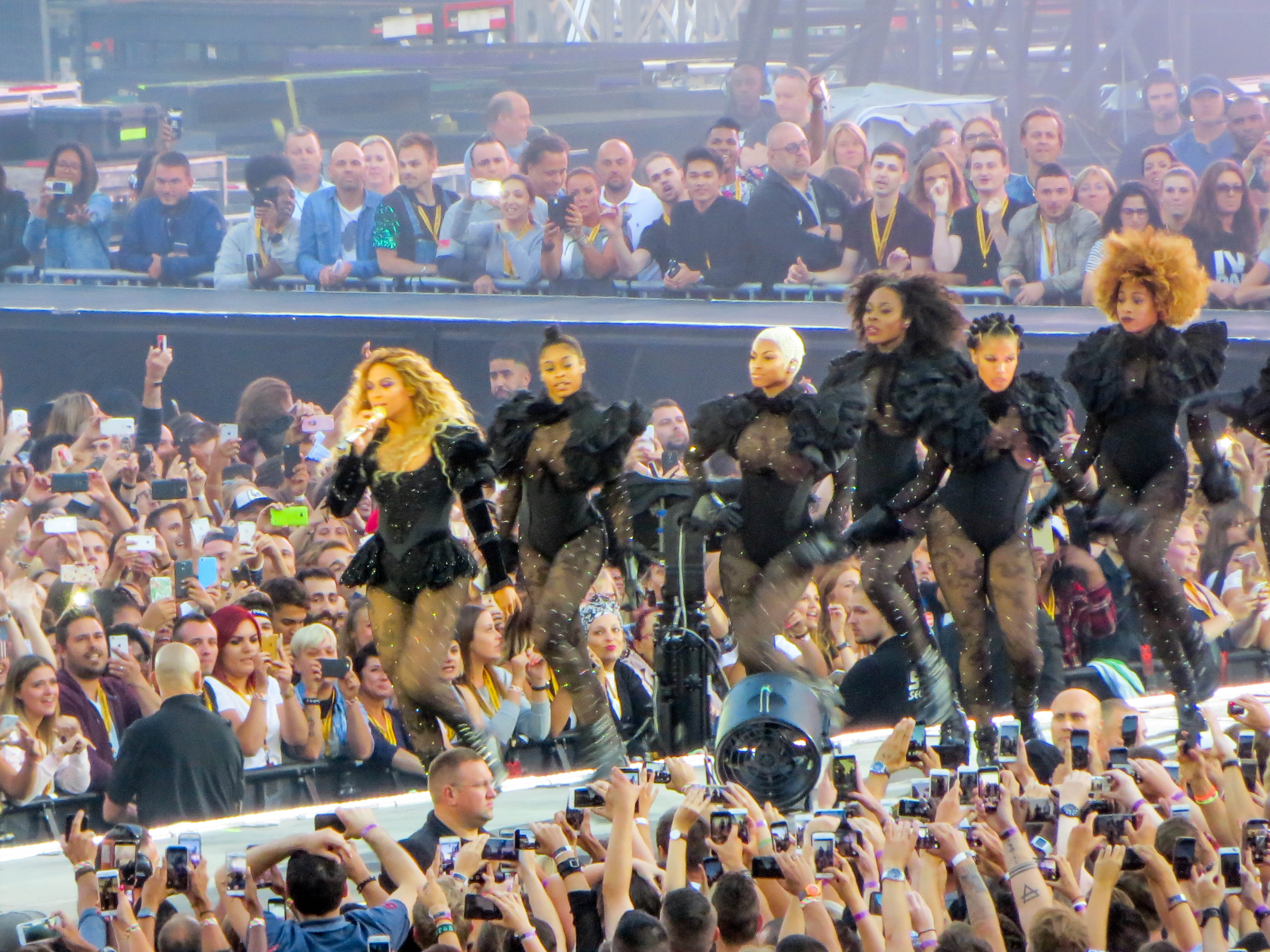
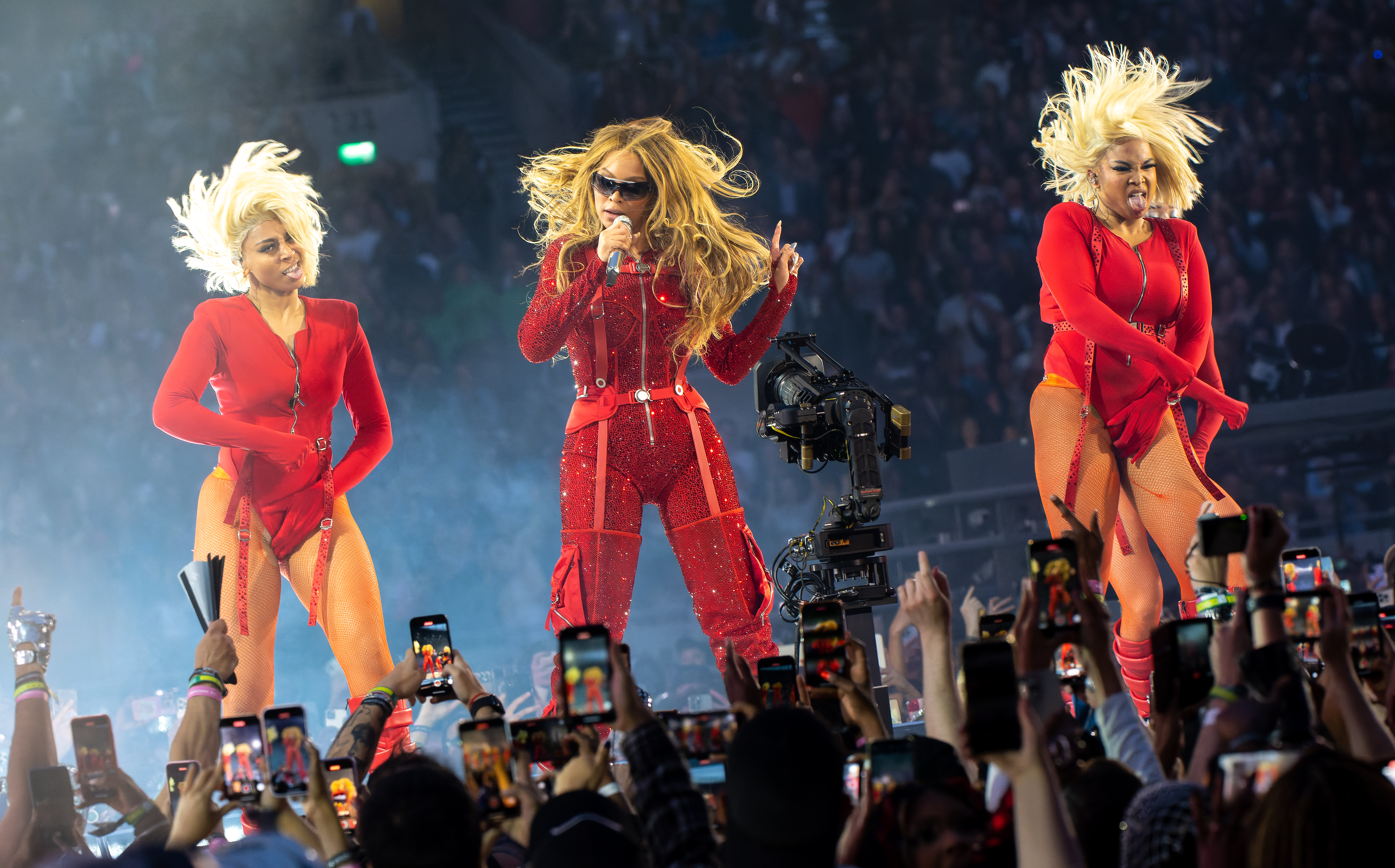
Beyoncé performed "Formation" on The Formation World Tour in 2016 (left) and the Renaissance World Tour in 2023 (right)

During her 2018 Coachella performance, Beyoncé sang "Lift Every Voice and Sing", which is commonly known as the "Black National Anthem", and then transitioned into "Formation". Naima Cochrane of Billboard described the placement of the songs as "thoughtful", tying "Formation" – "an anthemic call to action celebrating her power as a black woman" – to the civil rights movement anthem. The performance was subsequently included in the 2019 Homecoming film and live album. Beyoncé performed "Formation" during the On the Run II Tour, her 2018 co-headlining stadium world tour with Jay-Z. The song was also performed at the 2018 Global Citizen Festival: Mandela 100 charity concert in Johannesburg, South Africa, which commemorated Nelson Mandela's 100th birthday. Beyoncé and her dancers each wore a different color and lined up in a row, forming a human pride flag to show support for the LGBTQ community. "Formation" was also part of the setlist of Beyoncé's 2023 Renaissance World Tour. The song opened up the army-themed "Opulence" act of the show. "Formation" was included on the 2025 Cowboy Carter Tour setlist.

== Controversy ==
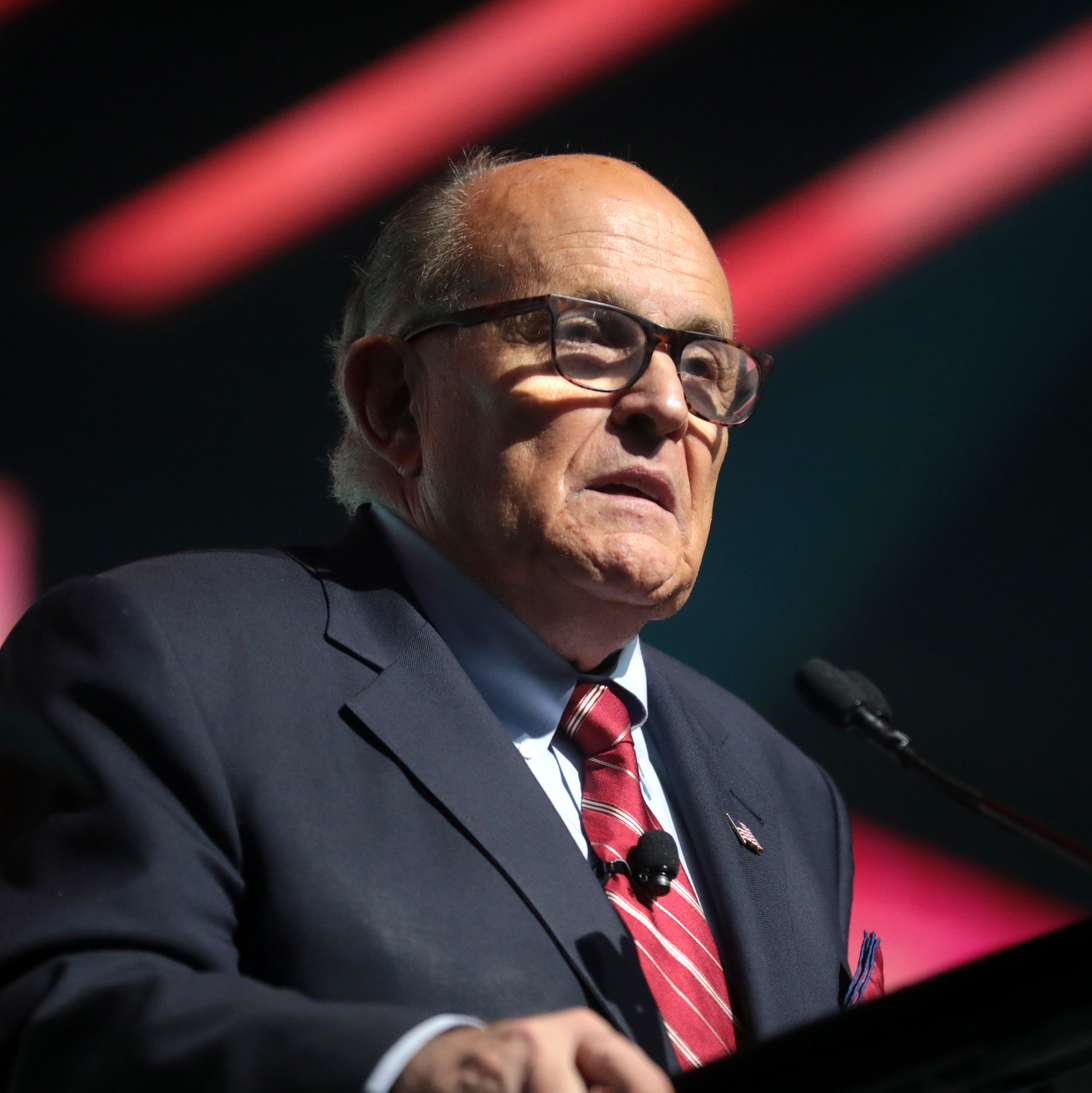
Rudy Giuliani

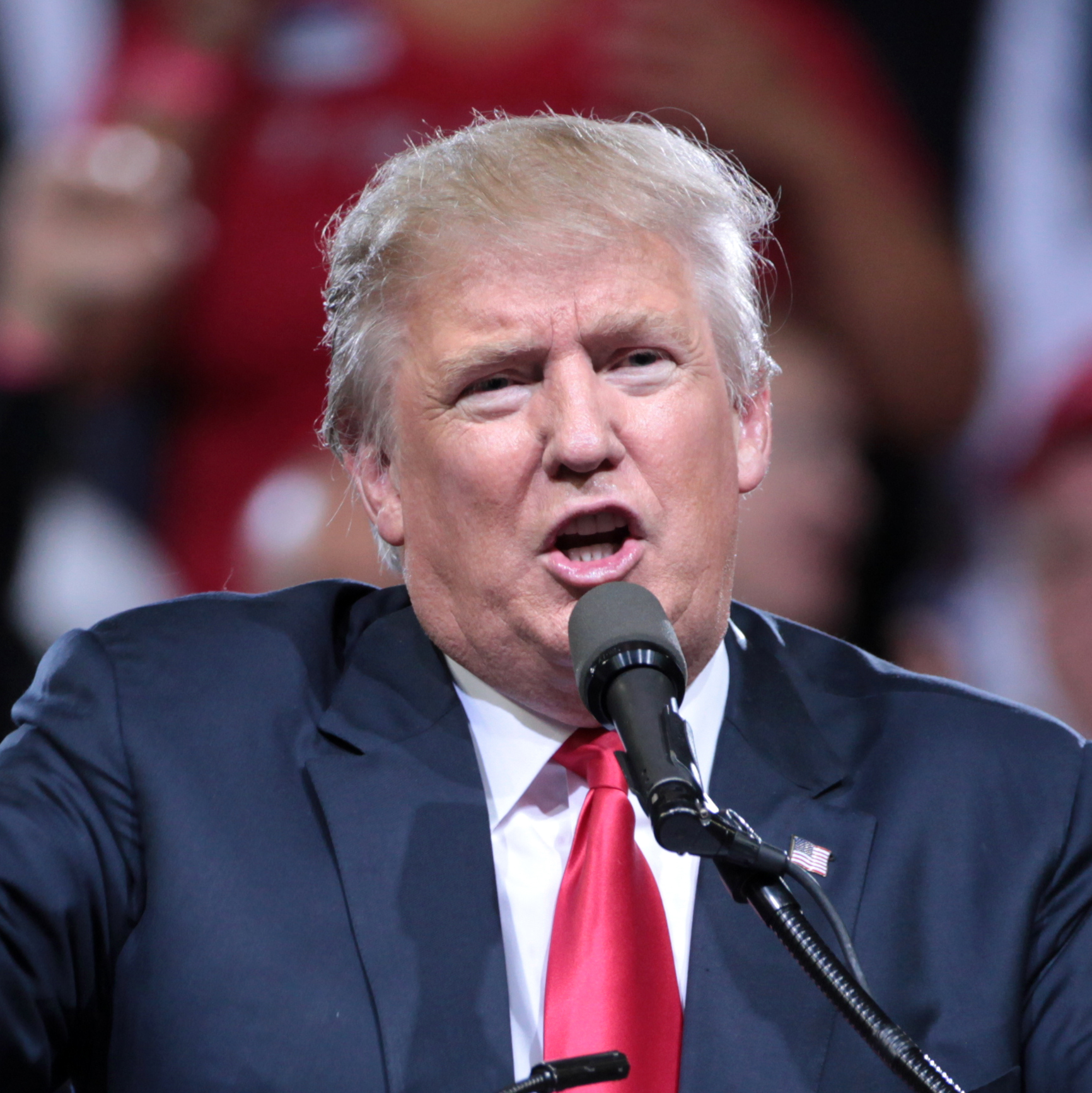
Donald Trump

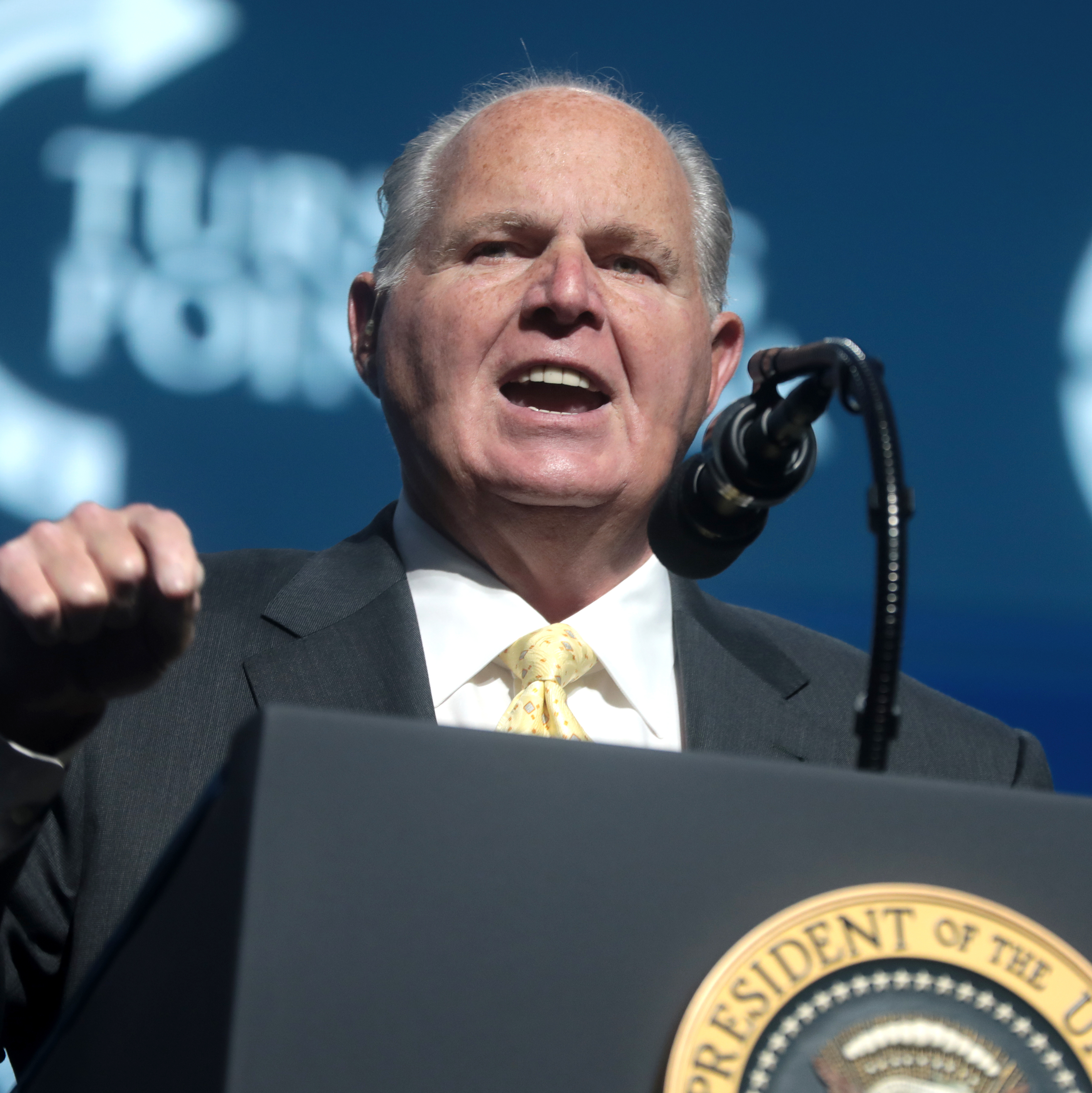
Rush Limbaugh

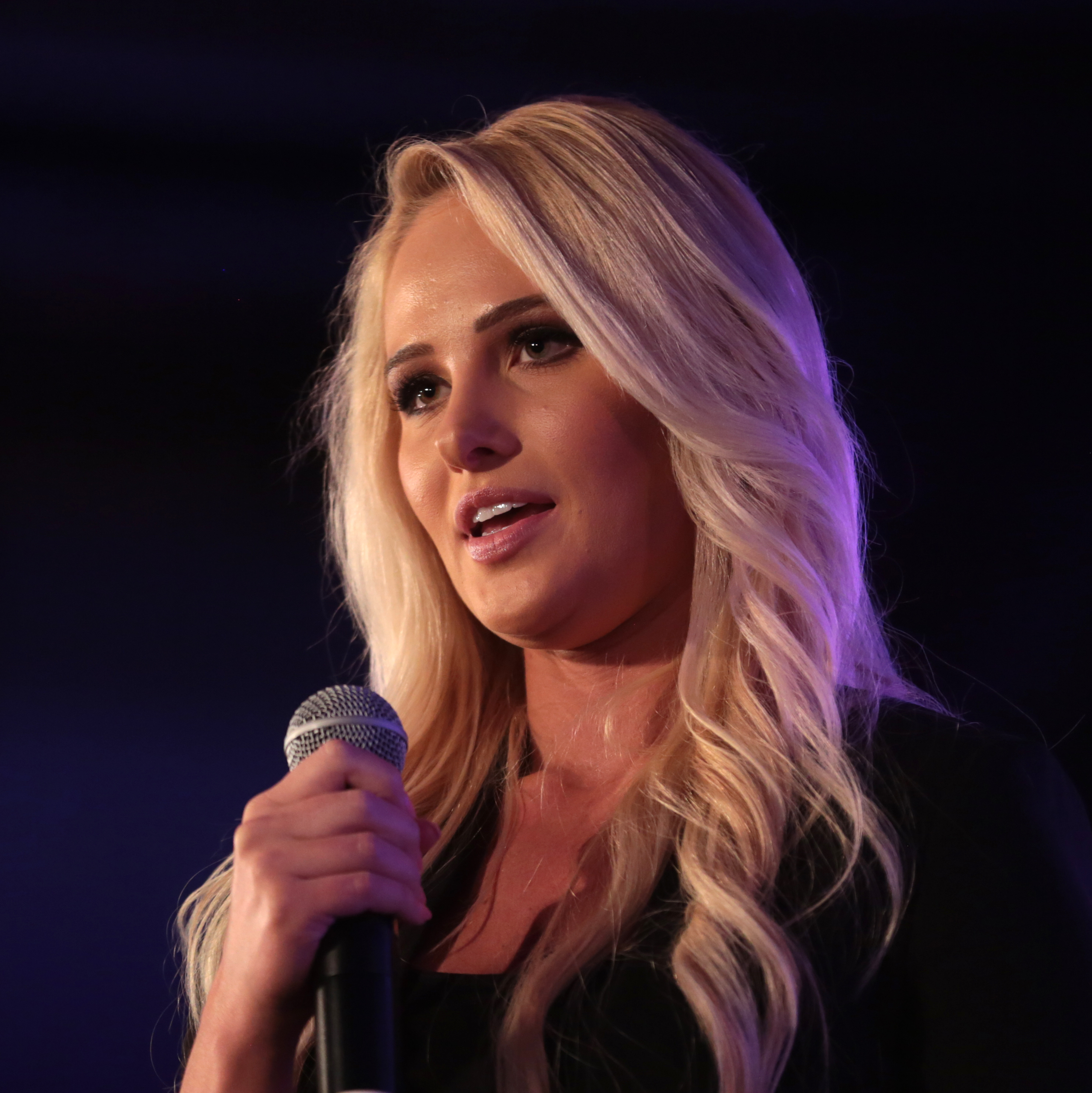
Tomi Lahren

"Formation" was met with criticism from various conservative figures, including those pictured above

"Formation", its music video, and the performance at the Super Bowl received criticism from some conservative figures, law enforcement organizations, and social media users over perceived anti-police, anti-American, and anti-white racist messages. U.S. president Donald Trump thought the performance was "ridiculous" and "not appropriate", saying it warranted a national scandal. Former Mayor of New York City Rudy Giuliani called the performance "outrageous", adding: "I don't know what the heck it was. A bunch of people bouncing around and all strange things. It was terrible." Congressman Peter King condemned the "Formation" video, saying that "no one should really care what [Beyoncé] thinks about any serious issue confronting our nation". Canadian politician Jim Karygiannis said that the Canadian government should investigate Beyoncé and consider banning her from the country following her Super Bowl performance. Conservative commentator Rush Limbaugh said that the song was "representative of the cultural decay and social rot that is befalling our country". British media personality Piers Morgan wrote that the song has a "police-hating theme" and characterized Beyoncé as an "agitating" figure who is playing the race card. Conservative TV host Tomi Lahren directed a rant towards Beyoncé, accusing her of "ramrodding an aggressive agenda down our throats" and concluding: "Your husband was a drug dealer. For fourteen years, he sold crack cocaine. Talk about protecting black neighborhoods? Start at home". Beyoncé requested to use thirty seconds of Lahren's rant for the Formation World Tour, but Lahren denied the request.

An anti-Beyoncé campaign was started on social media titled #BoycottBeyoncé, which was met with a competing #IStandWithBeyoncé hashtag. As part of the campaign, an anti-Beyoncé protest was held outside the National Football League headquarters on February 16, 2016, citing the "hate speech & racism" in Beyoncé's performance, which encouraged a counter-protest to be organized. In order to stoke unrest as part of the Russian interference in the 2016 U.S. elections, the Kremlin-backed Internet Research Agency placed adverts on Instagram urging people to attend the protests. Only three anti-Beyoncé protesters attended, while a larger counter-protest gathered, holding signs expressing statements such as "Pro-black doesn't mean anti-white".

Rutherford County Sheriff Robert Arnold blamed shots being fired outside his home on the "Formation" video. The National Sheriffs' Association made a link between Beyoncé's performance and the killings of seven law enforcement officers in the U.S. Police unions across the U.S. encouraged a boycott of The Formation World Tour. The Coalition of Police and Sheriffs protested outside Beyoncé's concert at NRG Stadium on May 7, 2016. The protesters wore "Police Lives Matter" T-shirts, held a printout of Jay Z's mugshot, and shone a blue light toward the stadium. President of the Tampa Police Benevolent Association Vinny Gericitano urged a boycott of Beyoncé's music and tour, however ensured that her concert in Tampa would be properly policed. Other law enforcement organizations did not join the boycott, such as those in Houston and Raleigh, the latter of which voted unanimously not to boycott the tour.

Other public figures defended Beyoncé. Writer Chimamanda Ngozi Adichie told Le Monde that she "very much admires" what Beyoncé did with "Formation". Adichie said that there is something in mainstream American culture "that says you cannot be too black", and questioned why people would feel uncomfortable with the song's message and not be outraged over police brutality. The controversy was discussed on Real Time with Bill Maher, where Maher mocked the right-wing response to "Formation". Rapper and activist Killer Mike explained how the song is not about white people, while comedian Margaret Cho added: "Black pride doesn't have to take anything away from white culture. I think this is what Black America needed. It's what all of us needed." Minister Louis Farrakhan backed the singer during a sermon and offered her the protection of the Nation of Islam. Singer-songwriter Ne-Yo questioned why Beyoncé was being criticized for singing about her identity, stating: "Everybody else has the right to talk about their culture and their race and be proud of it, so why can't we? Why can't she?" On The Daily Show, Jessica Williams defended Beyoncé and responded to commentators who said her performance was not "wholesome" enough, saying she did not realize singing about race was equivalent to Janet Jackson's Super Bowl controversy.

Beyoncé responded to the backlash, telling Elle: "I'm an artist and I think the most powerful art is usually misunderstood." She expressed respect and admiration for police officers and explained that the message of "Formation" was not anti-police but against police brutality and injustice. Beyoncé added: "If celebrating my roots and culture during Black History Month made anyone uncomfortable, those feelings were there long before a video and long before me. I'm proud of what we created and I'm proud to be part of a conversation that is pushing things forward in a positive way." Beyoncé later sold "Boycott Beyoncé" merchandise at the Formation World Tour, acting as a tongue-in-cheek reference to the controversy. The Atlantic's Spencer Kornhaber wrote that this was also a statement that Beyoncé was unwavering in her beliefs, which directly acknowledges "the people she's alienated and telling them she doesn't want them to come back".

== Legacy ==
=== Race and politics ===
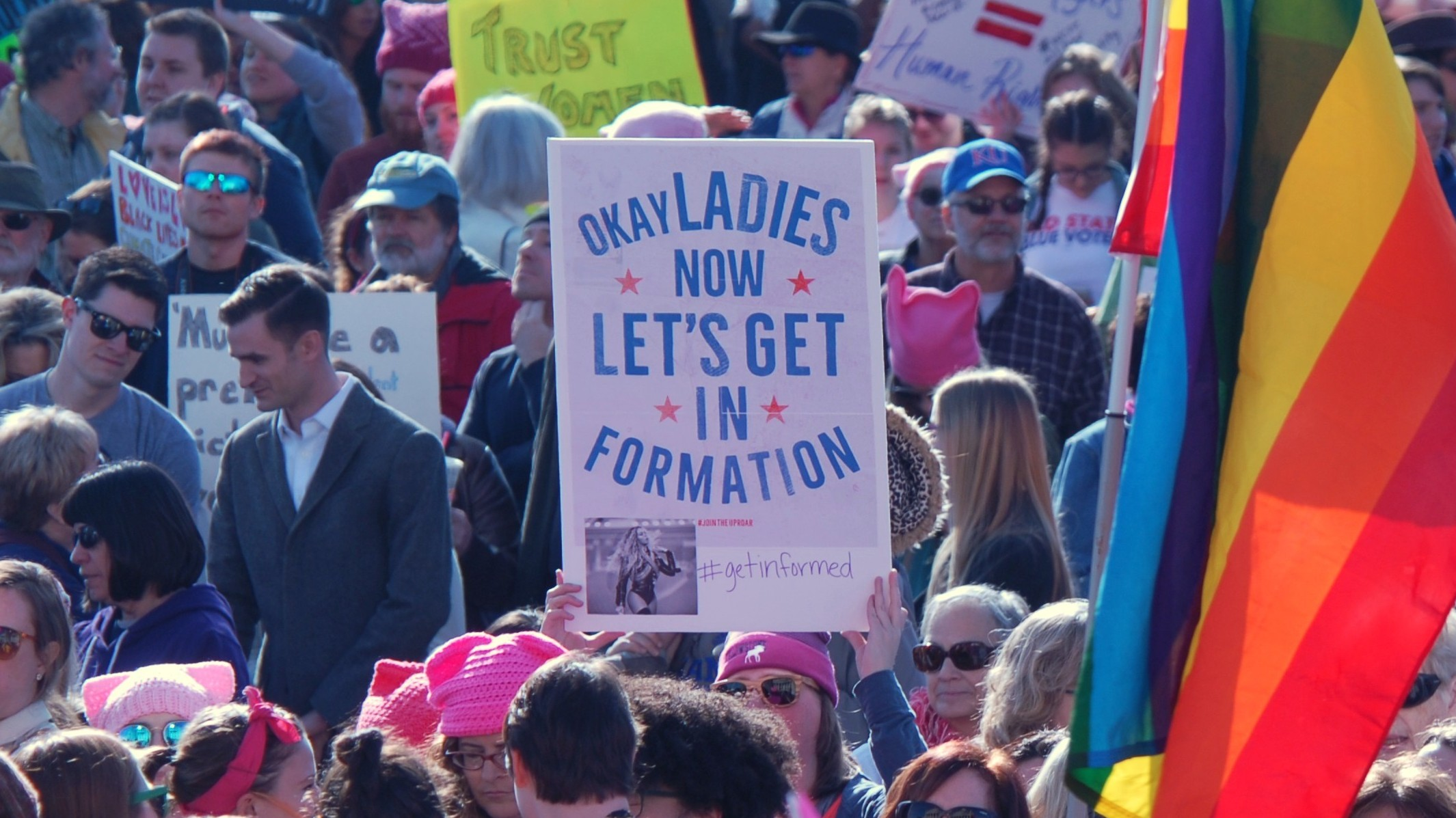
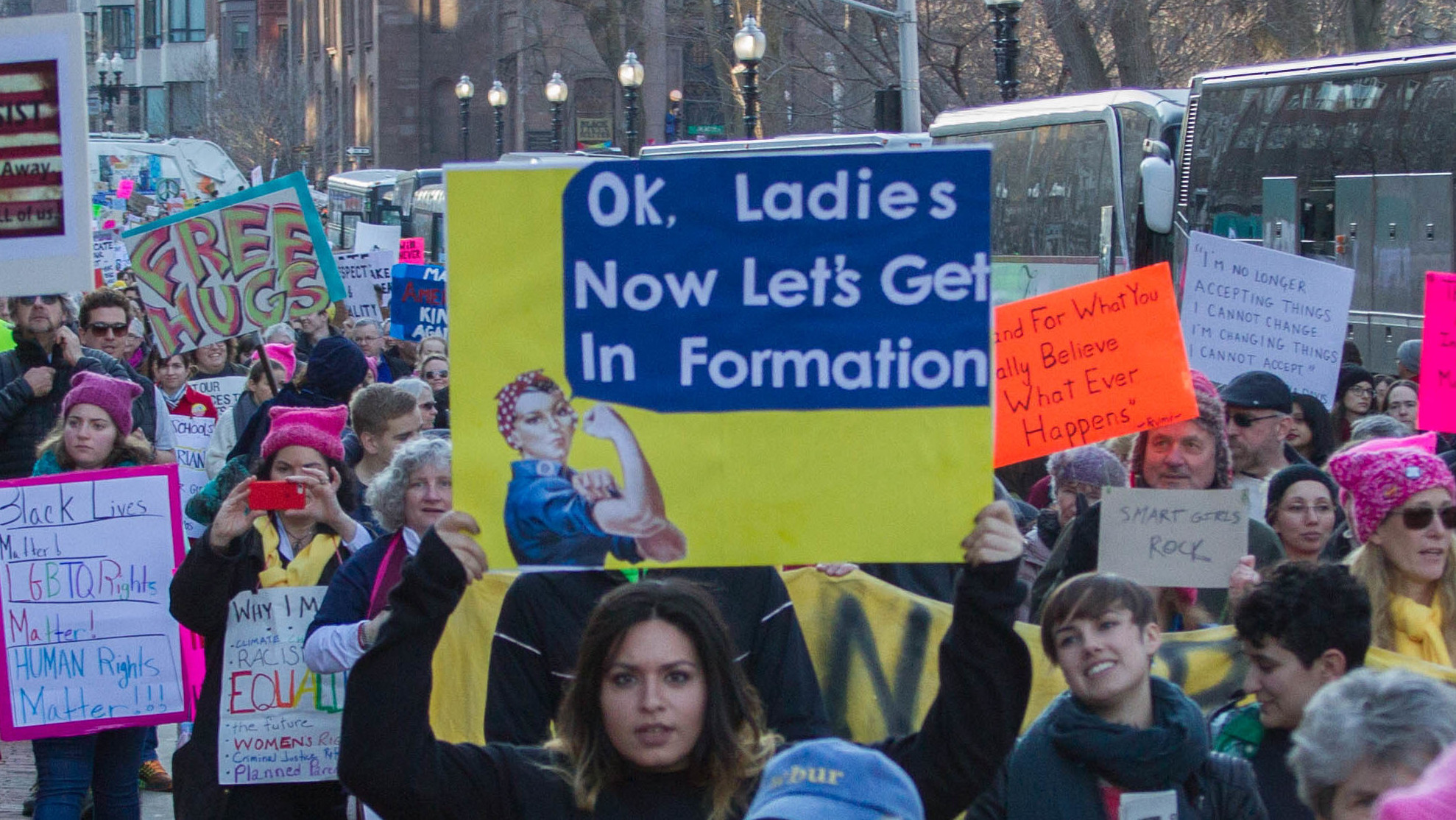
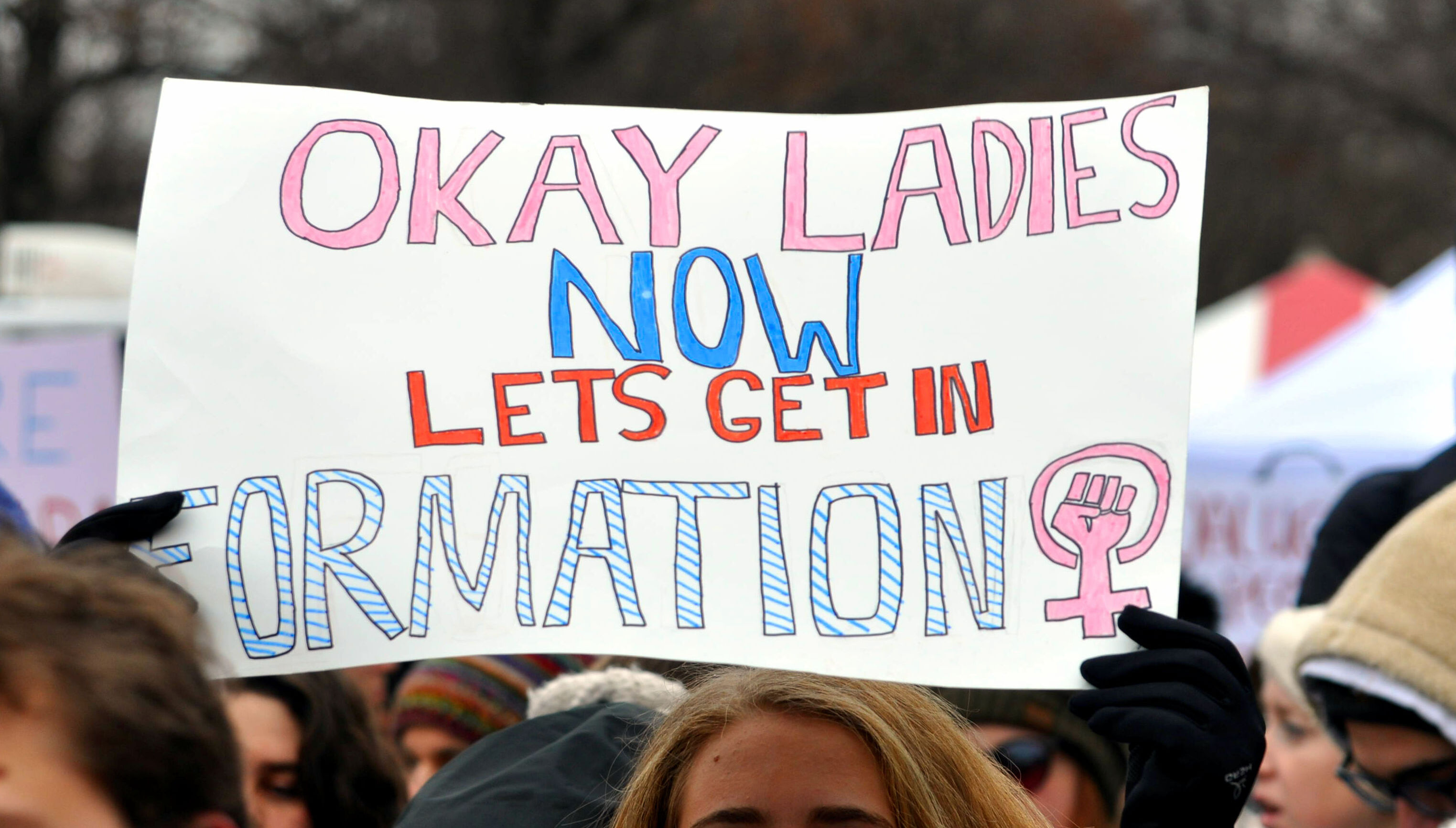
"Formation" has been used as an anthem for various sociopolitical movements, with its lyrics featuring on signs at protests

Upon its release, "Formation" dominated public conversation and ignited discussions on the topics of culture, racism, and politics. Many academic syllabuses, think pieces, ideological debates, and analyses were published in response to the song. Puja Patel, editor-in-chief of Pitchfork, wrote that the song was "an awakening for a country in crisis" at first, and it has since evolved to "live on as a reminder of the slow, persistent, daily work of organizing and the power of resilience and protest". Marquita Gammage wrote that the song forced Americans to address topics in American history that had largely been excluded from history books and public school syllabuses, such as the Black Power movement, the Black Panther Party, and Malcolm X. According to Kinitra D. Brooks, the song reclaimed the images of both the Black Lives Matter movement and Black Panther Party, which some Americans had associated with terrorism rather than liberation. Describing the song as "revolutionary", Riché Richardson wrote that it "unsettled the prevailing national fantasies of a post-racial America" and challenged listeners to envisage a future nation that is more inclusive of race, sexuality, and gender.

"Formation" garnered attention for the Black Lives Matter movement and raised awareness for issues facing black people before the 2016 U.S. presidential election. Charles Hughes, professor and director of the Memphis Center at Rhodes College, said that music was one of the strongest influences on the 2016 presidential election and that "Formation" had the greatest influence of all songs. Hughes described the song as "invoking movement" and reminding listeners of the role of women in the Black Lives Matter movement. In Michael Moore in TrumpLand, American filmmaker Michael Moore said that Beyoncé's performance of "Formation" at the Super Bowl was the breaking point of the shifting gender balance in American society, at which straight white men realized they were losing their power to women.

"Formation" became known as a protest song upon its release and has since been used as an anthem for various sociopolitical movements. The song became a Black Lives Matter anthem, being adopted by activists and played at protests worldwide. Tamara Winfrey Harris explained how "music has a powerful ability to shape social values and beliefs", with "Formation" following in the footsteps of songs that provide "the support and soundtrack for civil rights", such as Billie Holiday's "Strange Fruit", Nina Simone's "Mississippi Goddam", Sam Cooke's "A Change Is Gonna Come", and Aretha Franklin's "Respect". Nora Guthrie, daughter of American singer-songwriter Woody Guthrie, told Billboard that she looks to Beyoncé to continue the work of her father and other folk pioneers who wrote protest songs in the 1960s. Guthrie compared "Formation" to the work of Lead Belly, adding: "Just because the music isn't based in acoustic guitar doesn't mean it isn't drawing from the same ideals." Gerrick D Kennedy of the Los Angeles Times wrote that the song became part of the "soundtrack for a new generation of young black men and women during a renewed time of racial unrest" and helped Beyoncé become "the face of protest music" in 2016. "Formation" continued to be one of the protest songs of the Black Lives Matter movement in 2020, with the track being played at the George Floyd protests. The song also became a women's empowerment anthem, with it being used to show support for the #MeToo movement and its lyrics being featured on signs at the Women's March.

=== Music industry ===
Critics and scholars considered "Formation" to have innovated popular music in the 21st century. The release of "Formation" was a defining moment of 2010s music, according to Billboard's Bianca Gracie, with Beyoncé setting the standard for what popular music can be. Glamour's Danielle Young wrote that the song revolutionized how music is consumed, with Beyoncé making listeners stop and experience the song together. Writing for Vice, University of Waterloo professor Naila Keleta-Mae commented that Beyoncé went from "manipulating the pop culture music industry machine to usurping it" with "Formation", setting the blueprint for how artists can explore political issues while holding mainstream attention. In his 2025 book Blank Space: A Cultural History of the Twenty-First Century, W. David Marx named "Formation" as "almost a perfect piece of pop culture", given that its creative innovation challenges the artistic and cultural decline that has defined the 21st century to date. Marx cited the song's "adventurous" and "unique" sound and politically charged lyrics, describing it as "a perfect case of somebody using their stardom to innovate and create work that defines the time".

"Formation" was said to have reintroduced protest music to the mainstream. Jordan Bassett of NME wrote that the song brought protest music back. Yale University professor Daphne A Brooks agreed, writing for The Guardian that the song has ushered in a new "golden age" of protest music, as an "inspired, insurgent assault" that "challenges us to ask how we can all make cultural forms work for us and not the other way around".

The music video for "Formation" was also associated with a cultural impact on the music industry. According to Time's Raisa Bruner, the music video for "Formation" helped to move the art form forward, according . Sonia Rao of The Washington Post wrote that it ushered in a "music video renaissance", igniting a trend of boundary-pushing music videos that explore political issues.

=== Academic studies ===
"Formation" inspired the 2018 book Beyoncé in Formation: Remixing Black Feminism by Omise'eke Natasha Tinsley. The book is based on Tinsley's college course "Beyoncé Feminism, Rihanna Womanism", which she teaches as professor at Harvard University and the University of Texas at Austin, and analyses the cultural, political, and black feminist themes in Lemonade. In 2017, the University of Pennsylvania offered a course titled "Beyoncé, Protest, and Popular Music", which explored the risks that Beyoncé took when releasing "Formation", its place in the history of protest songs, and the role of gender and race in popular music. At the University of Hertfordshire, "Formation" was studied as part of the UK's first degree course focusing on the Black Lives Matter movement. In 2016, the University of Texas at San Antonio offered a class focusing on the "Formation" video and Lemonade album. These projects were used as a basis to examine the sociocultural issues affecting black women through the study of black feminist theory, film, music, and literature.

Texas Christian University offered a course titled "Beyoncé and Intersectionality", which used "Formation" and other Beyoncé projects "to explore deeper issues of patriarchy, racism, classism and sexism in society". In 2021, Boston University offered a course that studied the "Formation" video as part of a curriculum that explored how the South has been depicted in American fiction. The University of Wisconsin–Madison School of Nursing analyzed the concepts and issues in "Formation" to explore topics such as intersections of black history, black femininity, and body politics, and how the Black Lives Matter movement has impacted health and health outcomes. The 2017-18 Rabinor Lecture in American Studies at Cornell University by Riché Richardson was inspired by "Formation", being titled "Writing Home: The Birth of Beyoncé and a Formation Nation". Richardson also taught a course titled "Beyoncé Nation", which studied "Formation" and other projects to examine Beyoncé's use of iconic symbolism, allusions to police brutality, and feminist themes. The "Formation" music video was also included in the syllabus for the British A-level in Media Studies.

=== Popular culture ===
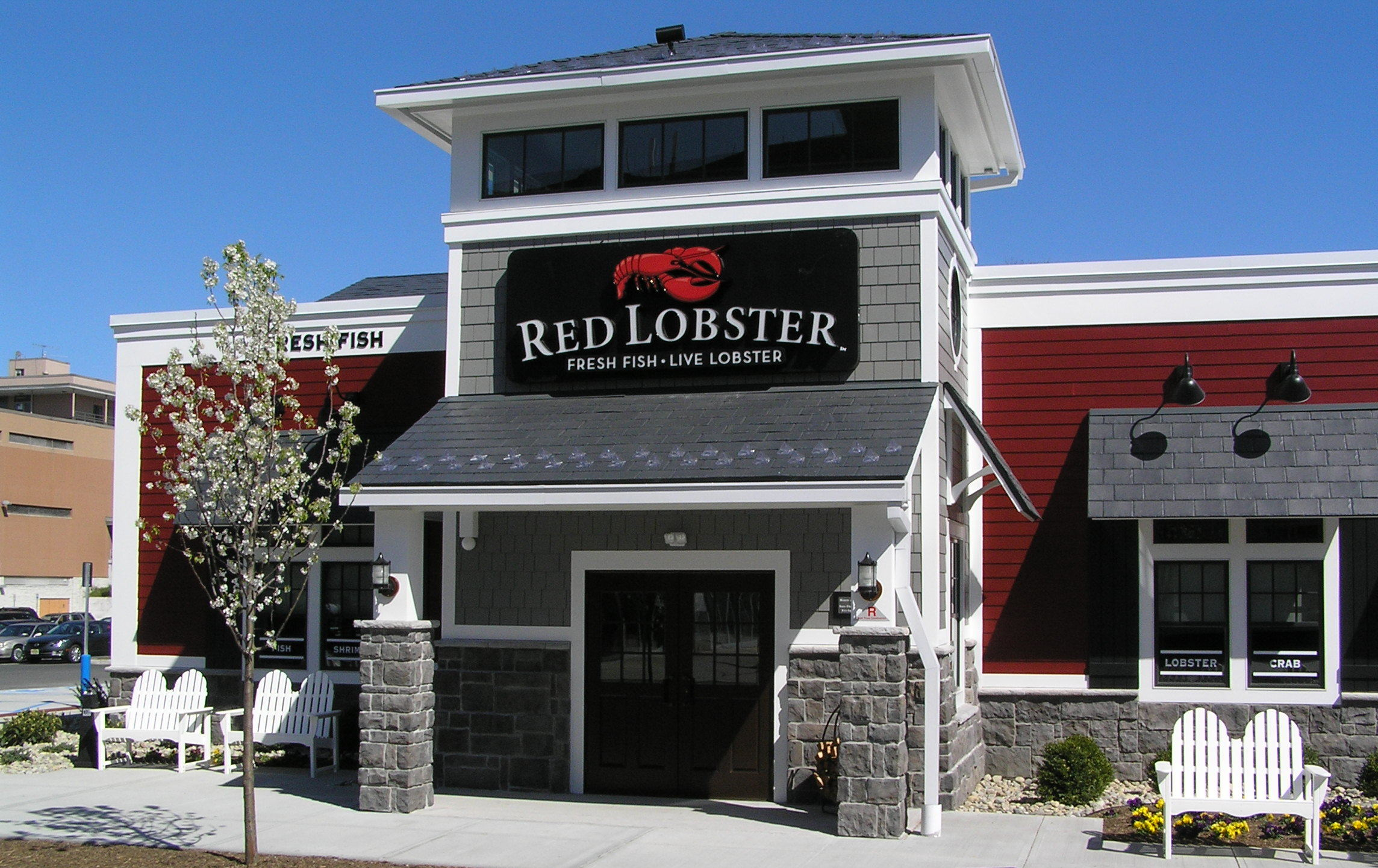
Sales at Red Lobster increased by 33% after it was referenced in "Formation"

References within the lyrics of "Formation" have popularized certain brands and phrases. The mention of the American restaurant chain Red Lobster increased sales at the restaurants by 33%. The chain was tweeted about over 42,000 times during the first hour of the song's release and trended for the first time in its history, according to Red Lobster spokesperson Erica Ettori. Employees also renamed popular menu items after Beyoncé and called the effect the "Beyoncé Bounce". Beyoncé's reference to the Chevrolet El Camino in the song and its feature in the music video helped boost the car's public profile, with Bloomberg's Hannah Elliott writing that Beyoncé "did more in 5 seconds for the El Camino than General Motors marketing did for years".

The term "Bama" received a major boost in prominence after it was used in "Formation", with the word subsequently being added to the Oxford English Dictionary. The word "slay" (meaning "greatly excel") was also popularized after it was used in the song. A novel method of screening drugs to combat antibiotic resistance was named SLAY (Surface Localized Antimicrobial Display) in reference to the song. Presbyterian pastor Floretta Barbee-Watkins evoked the song in the opening devotion of the 2021 Presbyterian Mission Agency Board meeting, where she called for the Presbyterian Church to "get in formation" by transforming the church in a time of volatility and complexity, and ended the devotion with the call to action "'cause we slay".

The lyric "I got hot sauce in my bag, swag" became a common refrain after the song's release and inspired people to produce related merchandise. In an interview with The Breakfast Club during her 2016 presidential campaign, Hillary Clinton referenced the lyric, saying she carries hot sauce in her bag. This sparked controversy, with some saying that she was pandering to young black voters.

One of the hairstyles that Beyoncé wore in the music video, with long cornrows with a deep side part, has since been termed "lemonade braids" after the album and remains a popular hairstyle for black women. The black power beret was given "a new lease of life" after the performance of "Formation" at the Super Bowl, according to The Guardian's deputy fashion editor Priya Elan, triggering the hat's comeback as a symbol of black power. Piping became the defining trend of the spring/summer 2016 fashion season after Beyoncé wore a piped shirt in the "Formation" video.

=== Tributes ===
The cover of Marvel's 2017 America comic book paid homage to the "Formation" music video, with its illustrator saying "America is a comic that is all about representation, feminism and fighting for what's right... I could think of no better parallel than Beyoncé." Saturday Night Live performed a sketch titled "The Day Beyoncé Turned Black" as a result of the release, airing February 13, 2016. Presented as a trailer for a horror movie, the sketch satirizes some white people's reactions to the "unapologetically black" song. It was named "the best SNL skit ever" by Tre'vell Anderson of the Los Angeles Times. Actress Goldie Hawn and comedian Amy Schumer produced a parody of "Formation", which also featured Wanda Sykes and Joan Cusack. The West End and Broadway musical Six references the song, with the character of Anne of Cleves singing "Okay ladies, let's get in Reformation".

== Cover versions and usage in media ==
Several white musicians released acoustic covers of "Formation". Jonny Hetherington, frontman of Canadian rock band Art of Dying, posted a cover of the song on February 18, 2016. In contrast to the original track, Hetherington sings with a clear vocal accompanied by piano chords. This video, among the other covers, sparked controversy as they were perceived to be trivializing the specific blackness of the song. In The Oxford Handbook of Social Media and Music Learning, Joseph Michael Abramo wrote that it is "striking and uncomfortable" to see a white man sing lyrics such as "I like my negro nose with Jackson Five nostrils", which celebrate black features that have been "denigrated by white conceptions of beauty". Abramo added that Hetherington's delivery eliminates the "grittiness" of the track, in turn eliminating "the criticism of institutional racism it represents". In response to these covers, Black Twitter posted trap covers of songs by white artists, such as Taylor Swift's "You Belong With Me", the Beatles' "Hey Jude", and Queen's "We Will Rock You". This also ignited a wider debate on the appropriation of black culture in music.

American electronic musician Lotic released a remix of "Formation" titled "Formation (Election Anxiety/America Is Over Edit)" on November 9, 2016, in response to the results of the U.S. presidential election. The song evokes Lotic's trademark industrial sound as well as that of marching bands, acting as a reference to Beyoncé's Super Bowl performance of the song and as a tribute to the South. The song was named "Best New Track" by Pitchfork, with Philip Sherburne writing that it "turns Beyoncé's strutting call to arms into a cry of pain and defiance".

Australian fashion brand Misha Collection concluded its Australian Fashion Week show on May 16, 2016, with models led by Bella Hadid walking to "Formation". This received criticism, as there were no models of color cast in the show, which acts in contrast to the song's message of celebrating blackness. This incident was used to initiate conversations on the lack of diversity in the fashion industry. The opening notes of "Formation" played on a loop during the 2016 off-Broadway production of Suzan-Lori Parks's The Death of the Last Black Man in the Whole Entire World, directed by Lileana Blain-Cruz. Blair-Cruz told The Interval that "Formation" was a major inspiration, due to its cultural impact and the way it "captures where we are at the moment". Daphne A Brooks wrote for The Guardian that the use of the song was "chilling", showing how it "remains the soundtrack for a black revolution still under way but shifting gears". "Formation" was also used in Google's 2021 Women's History Month commercial, which celebrated women who became "firsts" in their respective fields.

== Personnel ==
Credits adapted from Beyoncé's website.

Recording

- Recorded at The Beehive (Los Angeles)
- Mixed at Larrabee Sound Studios (North Hollywood) and Pacifique Studios (Los Angeles)
- Mastered at The Mastering Palace (New York)

Personnel

- Beyoncé – vocals, songwriting, production, vocal production
- Mike WiLL Made-It – songwriting, production
- Swae Lee – songwriting, ad-libs
- Pluss – songwriting, additional production
- Big Freedia – additional background ad-libs
- Matt Doe – trumpet
- Derek Dixie – horn arrangement
- Stuart White – recording, audio mixing
- Jaycen Joshua – audio mixing
- Maddox Chhim – assistant mix engineering
- David Nakaji – assistant mix engineering
- Arthur Chambazyan – assistant mix engineering
- Dave Kutch – mastering

== Charts ==
=== Weekly charts ===
Weekly chart performance
Chart (2016)	Peak position
Australia (ARIA)	17
Belgium Urban (Ultratop Flanders)	14
Belgium (Ultratip Bubbling Under Wallonia)	38
Canada Hot 100 (Billboard)	32
Denmark Digital Songs (Billboard)	6
Euro Digital Songs (Billboard)	6
Finland Airplay (Radiosoittolista)	96
Finnish Downloads (Latauslista)	9
France (SNEP)	24
Germany (GfK)	74
Hungary (Single Top 40)	13
Ireland (IRMA)	59
Italy (Musica e dischi)	50
Malaysia Digital Songs (Music Weekly Asia)	20
Netherlands Digital Songs (Billboard)	4
Norway Digital Songs (Billboard)	5
Portugal Digital Songs (Billboard)	10
Scottish Singles Sales (Official Charts)	11
Spain (Promusicae)	27
Sweden Digital Songs (Billboard)	2
Sweden Heatseeker (Sverigetopplistan)	7
UK Singles (Official Charts)	31
UK Hip Hop/R&B (Official Charts)	8
US Billboard Hot 100	10
US Hot R&B/Hip-Hop Songs (Billboard)	6
US Dance Club Songs (Billboard)	24
US Rhythmic Airplay (Billboard)	14

=== Year-end charts ===
Year-end chart performance
Chart (2016)	Position
Australia Urban (ARIA)	24
Belgium (Ultratop Flanders Urban)	81
US Hot R&B/Hip-Hop Songs (Billboard)	58

== Certifications ==
Certifications and sales
Region	Certification	Certified units/sales
Australia (ARIA)	2× Platinum	140,000^{‡}
Brazil (Pro-Música Brasil)	Diamond	250,000^{‡}
Canada (Music Canada)	Platinum	80,000^{‡}
New Zealand (RMNZ)	Platinum	30,000^{‡}
Poland (ZPAV)	Gold	25,000^{‡}
United Kingdom (BPI)	Gold	400,000^{‡}
United States (RIAA)	3× Platinum	3,000,000^{‡}
^{‡} Sales+streaming figures based on certification alone.

== Release history ==
Release dates for "Formation'
Region	Date	Format	Label(s)	Ref.
Various	February 6, 2016	Free download (Tidal exclusive)	Parkwood; Columbia	

== See also ==
- List of number-one urban singles of 2016 (Australia)
