= Formation (music video) =

- Official Vevo thumbnail for "Formation"
- Directed by: Melina Matsoukas
- Starring: Beyoncé; Big Freedia (voice only); Messy Mya (voice only)
- Music by: Beyoncé
- Release date: February 6, 2016; (premiere)
- Running time: 4:47
- Country: United States
- Language: English

The music video for American singer and songwriter Beyoncé's 2016 single "Formation" was directed by Melina Matsoukas. It was filmed over the span of two days in Los Angeles, California. The video premiered on February 6, 2016, alongside the song's debut exclusively on Tidal. The video was also uploaded to Beyoncé's official YouTube channel unlisted, meaning this prevented the music video from being accessed by search functionalities, with viewers needing to access the video via Beyoncé's official website.

The video begins with Beyoncé crouching on top of a New Orleans police interceptor, which is partially submerged in floodwaters. As the video progresses, the car gradually sinks into the water. Another set of scenes portray Beyoncé as the mistress of an all-black household in a Southern plantation-style house, reclaiming the legacy of slavery in the South. Beyoncé and her dancers perform in an empty swimming pool in another scene. Beyoncé is later depicted standing in front of a plantation house with a black wide-brimmed hat covering her eyes. In another scene, a man can be seen holding a newspaper titled The Truth with an image of Martin Luther King Jr. on the front page. The last sequence depicts a young boy in a hoodie dancing in front of a line of police officers in riot gear. When the boy holds up his hands, the officers reciprocate the gesture. The video cuts to a wall graffitied with the phrase: "Stop shooting us", echoing the demand of the Black Lives Matter movement for reform in policing and criminal justice.

The music video caused controversy from conservative figures, law enforcement organizations and social media users over perceived anti-police, anti-American and racist messages, including the National Sheriffs' Association and the Internet Research Agency. It won the Grammy Award for Best Short Form Music Video and MTV Video Music Award for Video of the Year, among various other accolades.

External videos
- Formation (Explicit) (4:52)

== Development ==
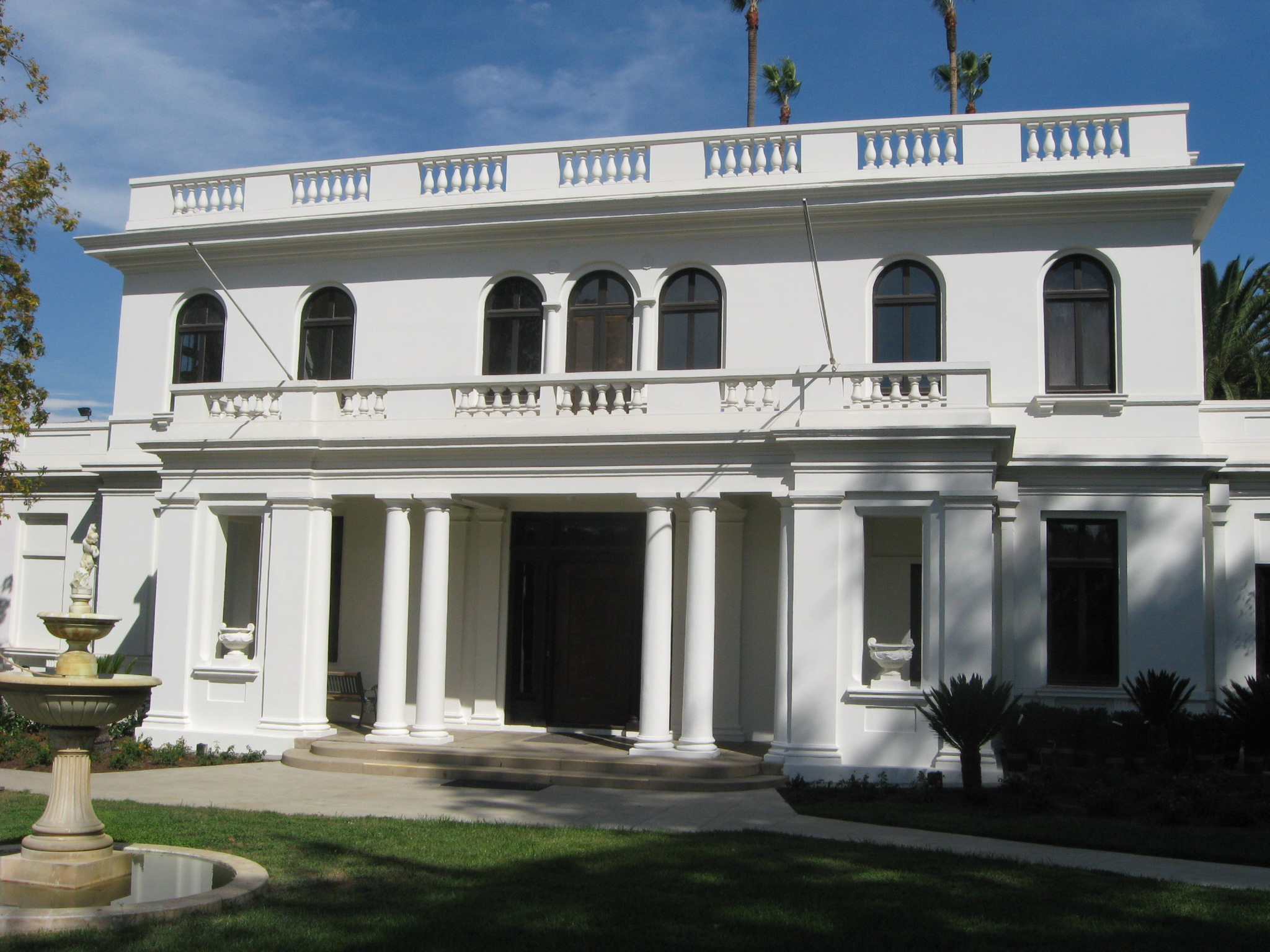
The Fenyes Estate was used as a filming location due to its resemblance to a New Orleans plantation house

Beyoncé approached Melina Matsoukas to direct the accompanying music video for "Formation" a few weeks before its release. After Matsoukas agreed to direct the video, Beyoncé invited Matsoukas to her house in Los Angeles and explained the concept behind Lemonade. They also discussed Beyoncé's family history, the South, and New Orleans. Matsoukas explained how she treats the videos she directs "like a thesis project", spending hours browsing art books, magazines, and websites. For the "Formation" video, she found ideas in the work of Toni Morrison, Maya Angelou, and Octavia Butler. Matsoukas conceived scenes featuring events from throughout black history, including slavery, Mardi Gras parades and the Rodney King protests. Matsoukas told The New Yorker: "I wanted to show — this is black people. We triumph, we suffer, we're drowning, we're being beaten, we're dancing, we're eating, and we're still here". She wrote out a treatment at 2 am and sent it to Beyoncé at 5 or 6 am, thinking that Beyoncé would reply later in the day. However, Beyoncé responded immediately and asked to discuss it further.

One set for the video was the Fenyes Estate, which was used due to its resemblance to New Orleans plantation houses. To evoke a Southern Gothic aesthetic, production designer Ethan Tobman and his crew decorated rooms with vintage plantation-era rugs and furniture, while adding storm shutters, Spanish moss, ivy, and wisteria to the building's exterior. Matsoukas wanted to include French Renaissance-style portraits of black subjects in the house, with the aim of subverting traditional power dynamics by portraying a plantation house where the black people are the masters and not the slaves. The crew looked for such portraits but found that none existed, so they painted black people over other portraits and hung them on the walls.

The music video for "Formation" was shot in Los Angeles, California over two days. Arthur Jafa was hired as camera operator; Jafa had been the cinematographer of Daughters of the Dust, a 1991 film about Gullah women in South Carolina whose focus on black sisterhood is echoed throughout the "Formation" video. Matsoukas wanted to create a sense of verisimilitude in the video, shooting some scenes with a camcorder and others with a Bolex camera, the latter giving the scenes a grainy look resembling documentary footage. Matsoukas also used footage from That B.E.A.T., a 2014 documentary about bounce culture in New Orleans. The filmmakers of the documentary were alternately pleased with its inclusion and frustrated by their work being used as "just b-roll by someone else". A representative for Beyoncé told Entertainment Weekly that the documentary footage was used with permission and licensed from the owner of the footage, and that they were correctly compensated and credited.

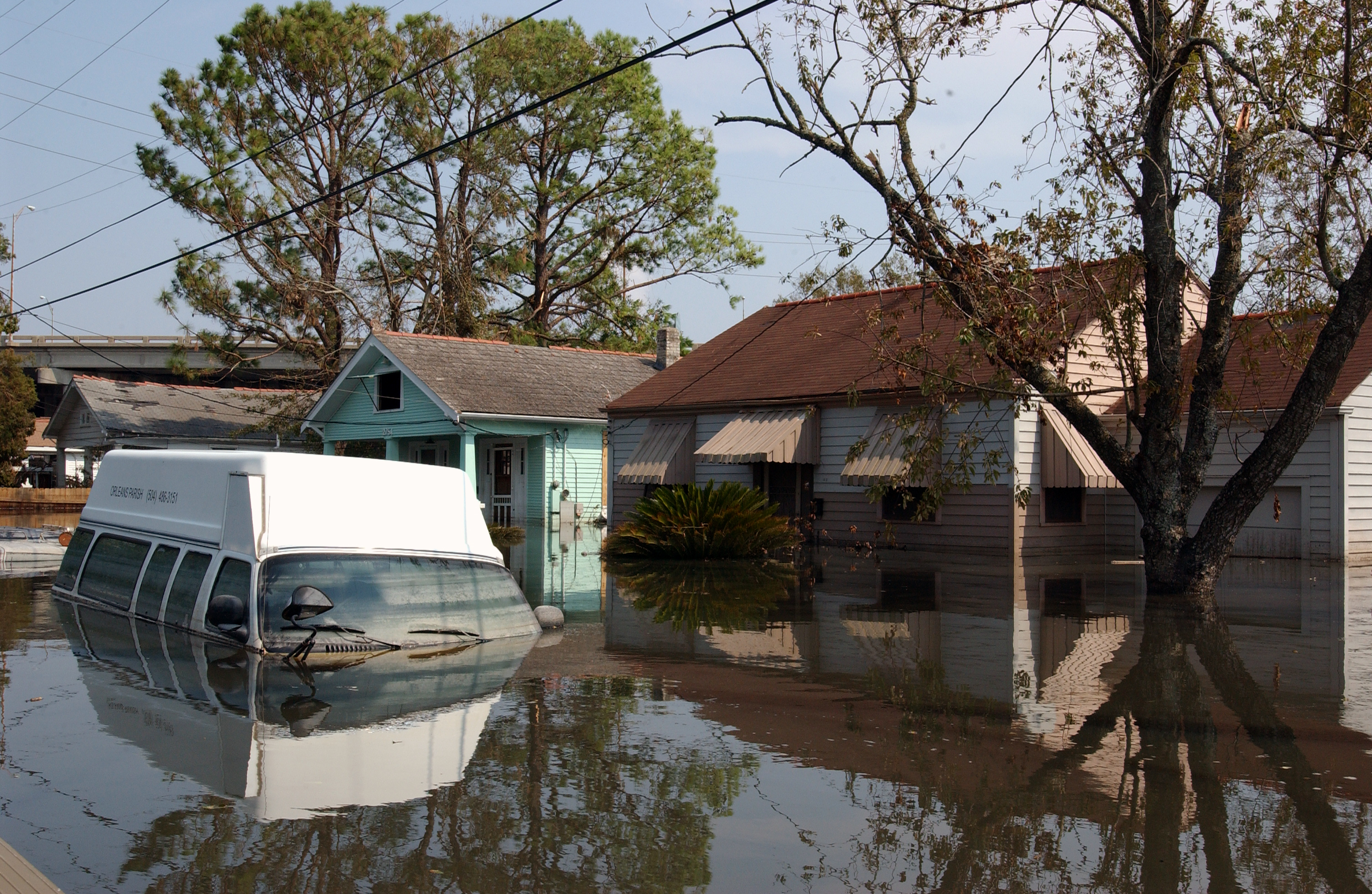
Some scenes in the video depict flooding in New Orleans following Hurricane Katrina

Matsoukas devised a scene of Beyoncé performing on top of a police car that slowly sinks into the floodwaters of Hurricane Katrina. This scene represented how the police "hadn't really shown up for us, and that we were still here on top, and that she was one with the people who had suffered". The scene was filmed on a soundstage with an artificial lake backed by a blue screen, with oak trees, rooftops and cast iron gates added to the lake to provide realism. A series of pulleys and cables connected to a winch and a crane allowed Beyoncé and the police car to be repeatedly sunk into the water with controlled speed. The scene was filmed using one camera suspended by a crane on a barge and another camera that Matsoukas operated from a speedboat. Beyoncé's mother Tina Knowles-Lawson was scared because the water was cold and called Matsoukas saying "You're going to give her pneumonia, and she has to perform at the Super Bowl", however Beyoncé did not complain. Instead of ending the video with Beyoncé sinking into the water, Matsoukas wanted to use a more uplifting image. Looking through the footage, she found a shot of Beyoncé sitting in the plantation house making the "black-girl air grab". She placed this clip at the end of the video as an emphatic last gesture.

== Synopsis and analysis ==
The music video is set in New Orleans, exploring interpretations of the city's past, present and future in the wake of Hurricane Katrina, in turn forming a celebration of black pride and resilience. It features rapidly edited scenes that depict the variety and heterogeneity of black Southern culture. This includes Mardi Gras, black cowboys, stepping, wig shops, crawfish, cotillions, grills, black preachers, second lines, marching bands, bounce dancers, and traditional courtship and burial rituals. Beyoncé is seen embodying several archetypal Southern black women that span time, class, and space, which Ryann Donnelly viewed as being nine distinct personas that recur throughout the video. The video modifies the song to include spoken interpolations from the New Orleans artist Big Freedia and the YouTube personality Messy Mya, who was murdered in New Orleans in 2010. Dance routines are performed throughout the video by Beyoncé accompanied by back-up dancers. Her daughter Blue Ivy Carter makes a cameo appearance, sporting a natural afro.

The video begins with Beyoncé crouching on top of a New Orleans police interceptor, which is partially submerged in floodwaters. As the video progresses, the car gradually sinks into the water. The scene forms a criticism of the police response to Hurricane Katrina, which disproportionately affected people of color, while also acting as a symbol of rebirth. An additional interpretation of this scene is that Beyoncé is invoking Mami Wata, harnessing water as a force of life and destruction. Jennifer Sweeney-Risko believes Beyoncé's outfit in this scene to be a reference to the Student Non-Violent Coordinating Committee, who traveled through the South to plan freedom rides, sit-ins and voter registration drives while wearing jeans and simple dresses to replicate the clothes of the black working class. Another set of scenes portray Beyoncé as the mistress of an all-black household in a Southern plantation-style house, reclaiming the legacy of slavery in the South. Beyoncé and her dancers perform in an empty swimming pool in another scene, referencing the story of a recently desegregated public swimming pool in the 1950s being drained after Dorothy Dandridge dipped her toe in it. Beyoncé is later depicted standing in front of a plantation house with a black wide-brimmed hat covering her eyes, which Janell Hobson interprets as an invocation of the Vodou death loa Maman Brigitte. In another scene, a man can be seen holding a newspaper titled The Truth with an image of Martin Luther King Jr. on the front page. Headlined "More Than A Dreamer", the image contains the caption: "What is the real legacy of Dr. Martin Luther King, Jr. and why was a revolutionary recast as an acceptable Negro leader?" Laura Visser-Maessen wrote that with this scene, Beyoncé is bringing awareness to the whitewashing of King's legacy as a non-radical figure, which is being used to undermine the current movement for racial equality. The last sequence depicts a young boy in a hoodie dancing in front of a line of police officers in riot gear. When the boy holds up his hands, the officers reciprocate the gesture. The video cuts to a wall graffitied with the phrase: "Stop shooting us", echoing the demand of the Black Lives Matter movement for reform in policing and criminal justice.

== Reception ==
Syreeta McFadden for The Guardian noted that the video depicts archetypal southern black women "in ways that we haven't seen frequently represented in popular art or culture". Jon Caramanica of The New York Times described the video as "high-level, visuallystriking, Black Lives Matter-era allegory". In an interview for NPR, Dream Hampton described the video as a "visual anthem" that feels like "an Oscar-worthy feature". Hampton also praised how Beyoncé centers both black women and queer people in the video.

In 2021, Rolling Stone named "Formation" the greatest music video of all time. In 2019, Billboard named "Formation" the best music video of the 2010s, stating that it "served as an active reminder that black people could not be silenced". The video was included in E! News' "The Most Memorable Music Videos Ever" list, describing it as "a gorgeous paean to the Black experience in America, both a love letter and a rally cry."

=== Accolades ===
Year	Ceremony	Award	Result	Ref.
2016	AICE Awards	Best Music Video	Won	
2016	BET Awards	Video of the Year	Won	
2016	Camerimage Awards	Best Music Video	Nominated	
2016	Camerimage Awards	Best Cinematography in a Music Video	Nominated	
2016	Cannes Lions Awards	Excellence in Music Video – Grand Prix	Won	
2016	Clio Awards	Best Video of the Year	Won	
2016	London International Awards	Best Music Video	Won	
2016	London International Awards	Best Direction	Won	
2016	MTV Europe Music Awards	Best Video	Nominated	
2016	MTV Video Music Awards	Video of the Year	Won	
2016	MTV Video Music Awards	Best Direction	Won	
2016	MTV Video Music Awards	Best Pop Video	Won	
2016	MTV Video Music Awards	Best Cinematography	Won	
2016	MTV Video Music Awards	Best Editing	Won	
2016	MTV Video Music Awards	Best Choreography	Won	
2016	MTV Video Music Awards Japan	Best Female Video	Nominated	
2016	Q Awards	Best Video	Nominated	
2016	Soul Train Music Awards	Video of the Year	Won	
2016	Soul Train Music Awards	Best Dance Performance	Nominated	
2016	UK Music Video Awards	Best Urban Video	Nominated	
2016	UK Music Video Awards	Best Styling in a Music Video	Won	
2016	WatsUp TV Africa Music Video Awards	Best International Video	Won	
2017	Grammy Awards	Best Music Video	Won	
2017	iHeartRadio Music Awards	Best Music Video	Nominated	
2017	NAACP Image Awards	Outstanding Music Video	Won	
2017	Nickelodeon Kids' Choice Awards	Favorite Music Video	Nominated	
2017	Nickelodeon Kids' Choice Awards Brazil	Best Music Clip	Nominated	
2017	NME Awards	Best Music Video	Nominated	
2017	One Show Awards	Cultural Diver Award	Won	
2017	One Show Awards	Best Music Video	Won	
2017	Webby Awards	Best Music Video	Won	

== Controversy ==
The music video, as well as the song in general and its performance at the Super Bowl halftime show received criticism from conservative figures, law enforcement organizations and social media users over perceived anti-police, anti-American and racist messages. Former Mayor of New York City Rudy Giuliani called the performance "outrageous", adding: "I don't know what the heck it was. A bunch of people bouncing around and all strange things. It was terrible." Congressman Peter King condemned the "Formation" video, saying that "no one should really care what she thinks about any serious issue confronting our nation". Canadian politician Jim Karygiannis said that the Canadian government should investigate Beyoncé and consider banning her from the country. Conservative TV host Tomi Lahren directed a rant towards Beyoncé, accusing her of "ramrodding an aggressive agenda down our throats" and concluding: "Your husband was a drug dealer. For fourteen years, he sold crack cocaine. Talk about protecting black neighborhoods? Start at home". Beyoncé requested to use thirty seconds of Lahren's rant for the Formation World Tour, but Lahren denied the request. An anti-Beyoncé campaign was started on social media titled #BoycottBeyoncé, which was met with a competing #IStandWithBeyoncé hashtag.

Rutherford County Sheriff Robert Arnold blamed shots being fired outside his home on the "Formation" video. Police unions across the US encouraged a boycott of the Formation World Tour. Outside Beyoncé's concert at NRG Stadium on May 7, 2016, the Coalition of Police and Sheriffs held a demonstration over the Black Lives Matter themes in "Formation". The protesters wore "Police Lives Matter" T-shirts, held a printout of Jay Z's mugshot, and shone a blue light toward the stadium. President of the Tampa Police Benevolent Association Vinny Gericitano urged a boycott of Beyoncé's music and tour, however ensured that her concert in Tampa would be properly policed. Other law enforcement organizations did not join the boycott, such as those in Houston and Raleigh, the latter of which voted unanimously not to boycott the tour.

== Legacy ==
=== Academic study ===
In 2016, the University of Texas at San Antonio offered a class focusing on the "Formation" video. The video was used as a basis to examine the sociocultural issues affecting black women through the study of black feminist theory, film, music, and literature. In 2021, Boston University offered a course that studied the "Formation" video as part of their exploration of how the South has been depicted in American fiction. The University of Wisconsin–Madison School of Nursing analyzed the concepts and issues in "Formation" to explore topics such as intersections of black history, black femininity and body politics, and how the Black Lives Matter movement has impacted health and health outcomes. Beyoncé's shoutout to the Chevrolet El Camino car in the song and its feature in the music video "did more in 5 seconds for the El Camino than General Motors marketing did for years", according to Hannah Elliott of Bloomberg. One of the hairstyles that Beyoncé wore in the music video, with long cornrows with a deep side part, has since been termed "Lemonade braids" after the album and remains a popular hairstyle for black women.

=== Brands ===
Beyoncé's use and references to various brands have resulted in sales spikes for their respective products. The mention of the American restaurant chain Red Lobster in "Formation" increased sales at its restaurants by 33%, and upon the song's release, the chain was tweeted about over 42,000 times during the first hour and trended for the first time in its history according to Red Lobster spokesperson Erica Ettori. Employees also renamed popular menu items after Beyoncé and call the effect the "Beyoncé Bounce".

=== Fashion ===
The black power beret was given "a new lease of life" after the performance of "Formation" at the Super Bowl, according to The Guardian's deputy fashion editor Priya Elan, triggering the hat's comeback as a symbol of black power. Piping became the defining trend of the spring/summer 2016 fashion season after Beyoncé wore a piped shirt in the "Formation" video.

=== Parodies and homages ===
The cover of Marvel's 2017 America comic book paid homage to the "Formation" music video, with its illustrator saying "America is a comic that is all about representation, feminism and fighting for what's right ... I could think of no better parallel than Beyoncé."

Saturday Night Live performed a sketch titled "The Day Beyoncé Turned Black" as a result of the release, airing Saturday, February 13. The sketch, which depicted some white people's reactions to the "unapologetically black" song, was named "the best SNL skit ever" by Tre'vell Anderson of the Los Angeles Times. Actress Goldie Hawn and comedian Amy Schumer produced a parody of "Formation", which also featured Wanda Sykes and Joan Cusack.
