= AICE =

AICE may refer to:

- Advanced International Certificate of Education
- Association of Independent Creative Editors
- American Institute of Consulting Engineers, predecessor of the American Council of Engineering Companies
- American–Israeli Cooperative Enterprise, publisher of the Jewish Virtual Library
- Associate of the Institution of Civil Engineers

== See also ==
- American Institute of Chemical Engineers (AIChE)
- Aice5, a Japanese musical group
