= Re-cut trailer =

Parody video made from movie clips and trailers

A re-cut trailer, or retrailer, is a mashup video that uses footage from a movie or its original trailers to create a completely new context, or one different from the original source material. The mashups are parody trailers that derive humor from misrepresenting original films: for instance, a film with a murderous plot is made to look like a comedy, or vice versa. They started to become popular on the Internet in 2005.

== Creation ==
The making of retrailers became possible with the availability of consumer-level digital video editing suites. The more sophisticated of these allow the editor to separate the audio and video tracks of a clip, allowing the original score or soundtrack—these contribute most to a scene's tone—to be removed and replaced with another. By placing clips of different characters (typically closeups) together in sequence, a relation between them may be implied, regardless of where each character is actually situated within their respective movie. All that remains is to include certain conventions used by actual trailers, such as voice-over narration, titles and credits, and the familiar MPAA rating system copy (the white-on-green introductory screen).

== History ==
The earliest identified re-cut trailer debuted in December 2003, named Kill Christ, created by NYU film student Spencer Somers. It mocks the films Kill Bill: Volume 1 and The Passion of the Christ. In 2005, the format started to gain popularity with Robert Ryang's re-cut of The Shining, which made the horror film appear to be a light-hearted family comedy drama about father and son bonding, adding voice-over narration and Peter Gabriel's song "Solsbury Hill" to augment the re-edited footage. Ryang had made the re-cut trailer as part of a contest for the Association of Independent Creative Editors from post-production house P.S. 260 in New York City, with his entry winning. After it was published on the Internet, it jump-started the popularity of re-cut trailers for the internet community.

Soon after the Shining retrailer took the Internet by storm, Emerson College comedy troupe Chocolate Cake City created a re-cut trailer for the Back to the Future films, portraying the films' characters in a romantic homosexual relationship akin to the one by the main characters in the film Brokeback Mountain. The retrailer primarily used clips from Back to the Future Part III, which was set in the Wild West of the 19th century. As Brokeback to the Future gained popularity in early 2006, many more re-cuts were created using the framework of Brokeback Mountain to highlight or suggest queer subtext between characters from dozens of films, tv shows, and videogames.

In 2006, comedy troupe The Lonely Island made a Saturday Night Live Digital Short in which a trailer of Mel Gibson's then-upcoming film Apocalypto, a film entirely in the Yucatec Maya language, was recut and had English-language subtitles added to it based on statements made by Gibson during a well-publicized drunk driving incident of several months prior, to make it appear that the characters were saying antisemitic things.

With continued growth of the Internet, including the ease of mixing videos and publishing to sites like YouTube, re-cut trailers continued to gain popularity. While most were made with the intent of present a film in a different genre than intended, other trailers were made to rectify what some might see as bad marketing or approaches to movie promotion. A notable example was the fan-made re-cut of John Carter based on the Edgar Rice Burroughs character. Michael Sellers, a fan of Burroughs' work, had been disappointed by the trailers Disney had released, including the one used during Super Bowl XLVI. He and his friend Mark Linthicum spent the evening after the Super Bowl downloading available material for the film and other works to piece together a more representative trailer of the source material; this caught not only the attention of the film's director Andrew Stanton, but of major media productions that praised the trailer's quality over Disney's own efforts. In a similar vein, the web series Honest Trailers by Screen Junkies remixes films to create trailers that sarcastically portray what happens in the film.

== See also ==
- Video mashup
- YouTube Poop
