= Association of Independent Commercial Producers =

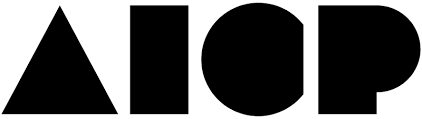
- Founded: 1972
- Purpose: Advertising and commercial production
- Location(s): 3 West 18th Street, 5th Floor; New York, NY 10011 650 North Bronson Ave. Los Angeles, CA 90004
- Region served: United States
- Website: aicp.com

The Association of Independent Commercial Producers, or AICP, is an American not for profit organization that represents the interests of United States companies that specialize in commercial production. Its members work in various media—film, video, digital—for advertisers and agencies. Founded in 1972, the association has national offices in New York City and Los Angeles as well as regional chapters.

In 2018, the AICP merged with the Association of Independent Creative Editors (AICE)—the former trade association for post production—under the AICP banner. The association promotes and advocates for independent production and post companies.

The AICP's purpose is to disseminate industry information; represent the production and post companies within the advertising industry, in labor negotiations and before governmental officials; create industry standards; and provide professional development. Every year they produce The AICP Show, The Art & Technique of the American Commercial, as well as The Next Awards, which honor marketing innovations in emerging media. Both events take place at The Museum of Modern Art in New York City. An AICP Show Honor is considered one of the top advertising accolades in the U.S., and each year the work honored is made a part of the archives of the Department of Film at MoMA.

In 2016, in conjunction with the Directors Guild of America, the AICP announced a new initiative to promote diversity and inclusion called the CDDP – Commercial Directors Diversity Program. The mission of the CDDP is to foster awareness and increase directing opportunities for women and other groups historically underrepresented in commercial directing. The first showcase of CDDP participants' work was presented in 2017. The program expanded in 2018 to include mentoring opportunities and workshops in addition to the showcase.
