= Messy Mya =

American rapper

- Born: Anthony M. Barre; December 15, 1987
- Died: November 14, 2010 (aged 22) New Orleans, Louisiana, U.S.
- Genres: Southern hip hop, bounce music
- Occupation: Rapper
- Years active: 2008–2010

Messy Mya (born Anthony Michael Barre; December 15, 1987 – November 14, 2010) was an American rapper and comedian from New Orleans, Louisiana.

== Biography ==
Anthony M. Barre was born on December 15, 1987, in New Orleans. On September 26, 2001, when he was 13, his mother was shot and killed by her abusive boyfriend. His grandfather, businessman Stan "Pampy" Barre, was later imprisoned for a kickback scheme involving City Hall.

Barre was a bounce music rapper, Internet personality, and comedian. By the time he was 22, his videos were receiving tens of thousands of views. Barre "favored fluorescent hair shades and caustic barbs". As Messy Mya, he adopted the persona of a diss artist and street comic who would interact with people in public places such as the Lakeside Shopping Center. His catchphrase was "Now who gonna pop me?"

Barre was shot several times and killed as he was leaving his girlfriend's baby shower on November 14, 2010, in New Orleans' 7th ward. His funeral was held at St. Peter Claver Catholic Church in New Orleans.

A week after Barre's death, Jason Hamilton was arrested for the murder and confessed. He spent three years in prison before being released when evidence surfaced proving he was not at the scene of the crime.

== Posthumous lawsuit ==
Barre was most known for the controversy regarding his voice being sampled in Beyoncé's 2016 song "Formation". Barre's estate sued Beyoncé for $20 million in royalties and to credit Barre for the use of his voice from his YouTube videos "A 27-Piece Huh?" and "Booking The Hoes From New Wildin". "Formation" sampled 10 seconds of Barre's voice from the videos, where he says "Bitch, I'm back by popular demand" and "What happened at the New Orleans?’".
