= Daphne Brooks =

American writer and black studies scholar

Daphne A. Brooks
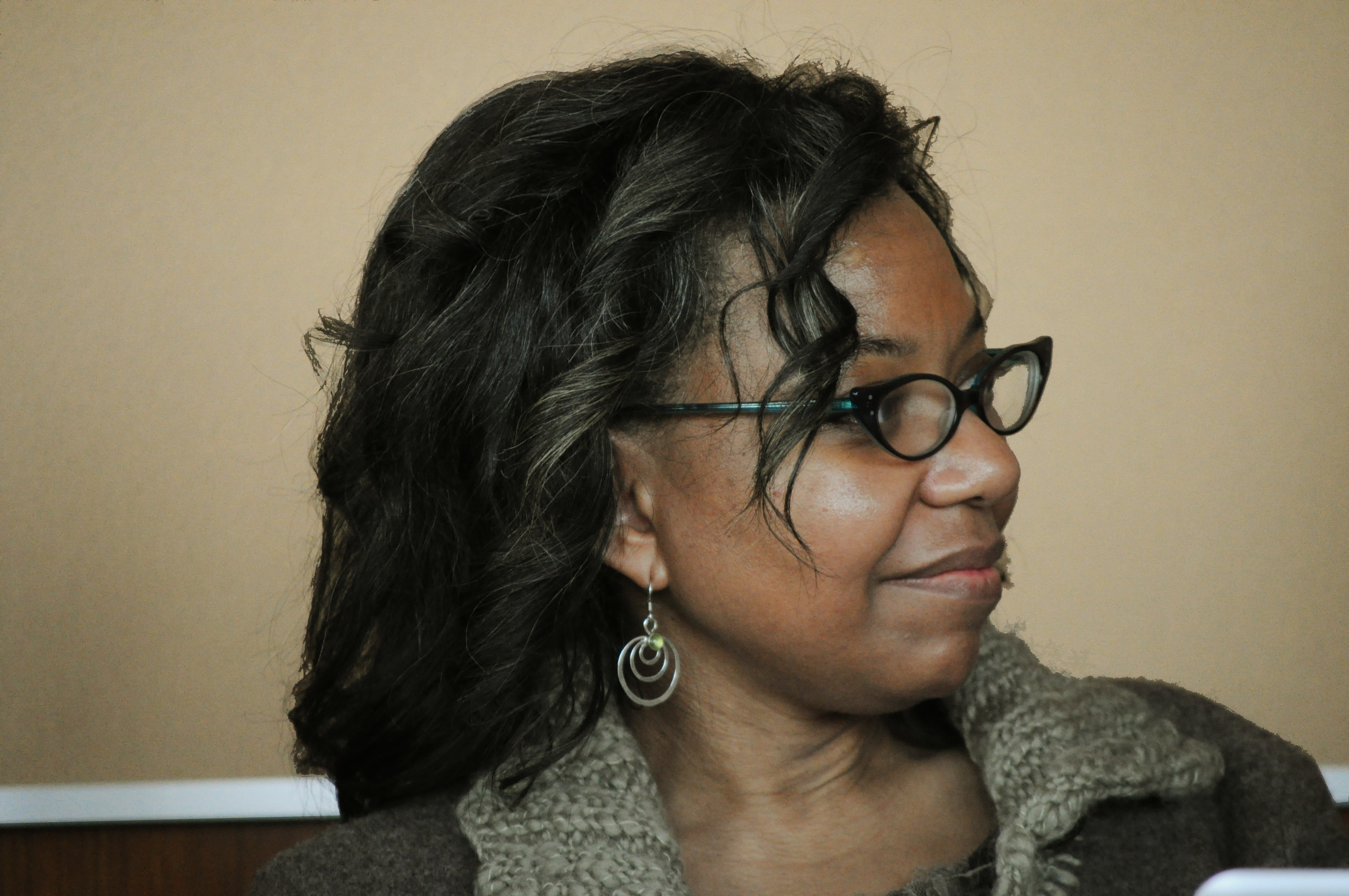
- Photo by Joe Mabel
- Born: November 16, 1968 (age 57); USA
- Education: University of California, Berkeley, University of California, Los Angeles
- Notable work: Jeff Buckley's Grace (2005); Bodies in Dissent: Spectacular Performances of Race and Freedom, 1850–1910) (2006) Liner Notes for the Revolution: The Intellectual Life of Black Feminist Sound (2021)

Daphne Brooks (born 1968) is an American writer and black studies scholar who is William R. Kenan, Jr. professor of African American studies, American Studies, Women's, Gender and Sexuality Studies and Music at Yale University; she is also director of graduate studies. She specializes in African American literary cultural performance studies, especially 19th century and trans-Atlantic culture. She is a rock music lover and has attributed her research interests in black performance to being a fan of rock music since a very young age.

She has written three books, Liner Notes for the Revolution: The Intellectual Life of Black Feminist Sound (Belknap Press, 2021), Bodies in Dissent: Spectacular Performances of Race and Freedom, 1850–1910 (Duke University Press, 2006) and Jeff Buckley’s Grace (Continuum, 2005).

== Early life ==
Brooks was born in Redwood City, California in 1968. Her parents moved to the San Francisco Bay Area in 1950. Brooks' father earned a B.A. in History and an M.A. in Education at the University of California. Brooks is the youngest of three children: her brother is seventeen years older and her sister is ten years older.

Brooks received a BA in English from University of California, Berkeley and an MA and a PhD (June 1997) in English from the University of California, Los Angeles.

== Interest in black performance ==
Brooks's interest in black performance was developed from her passion for rock music since she was a child. She frequently turns to music criticism to find out how a rocker's music was different from others, and how a piece of music was influenced by culture to embody greater issues like cultural heterogeneity, race and gender because of her passion in black rock music and substantial exposure to African American literature by her family.

== Performance studies ==
One of Brooks's research interests is exploring the significance of performance in the expression of black subjectivity. Brooks’ definition of performance studies:

To me, performance studies is a discipline that enables you to radically contextualize how we think about the production of culture and, as a black feminist scholar it enables me to think about the body and the corporeal as being central to our understanding of cultural production. So, what is performance studies? It’s thinking about embodiment as somehow enriching our understanding of text.

White audiences of the 19th and 20th centuries often perceived aspects of African American experience to be shaped by the perspective of white subjectivity, as their education was given and thus influenced by institutions led mostly by white people.

Brooks believes that black experience is shaped less by whites but by black radicalism. She ascribes black performance to a comprehensive understanding of black cultural production. In her book, Bodies in Dissent: Spectacular Performances of Race and Freedom, 1850–1910, Brooks describes how, in the performance of The escape, A leap for freedom, the black protagonist William Wells Brown performs acts that both figuratively and explicitly resists the repressive institution. As the performing body embodies black radicalism itself, performance studies to Brooks is a significant way of understanding black cultural production.

== Major works ==
=== Bodies in Dissent: Spectacular Performances of Race and Freedom, 1850–1910 ===
Bodies in Dissent: Spectacular Performances of Race and Freedom, 1850–1910 (Duke University Press, 2006) is Brooks’ major work on performance studies. The book seeks to explore the way black protagonists embody African American experiences as they assert subjectivity by resisting the racial institution and creating black identities through performance.

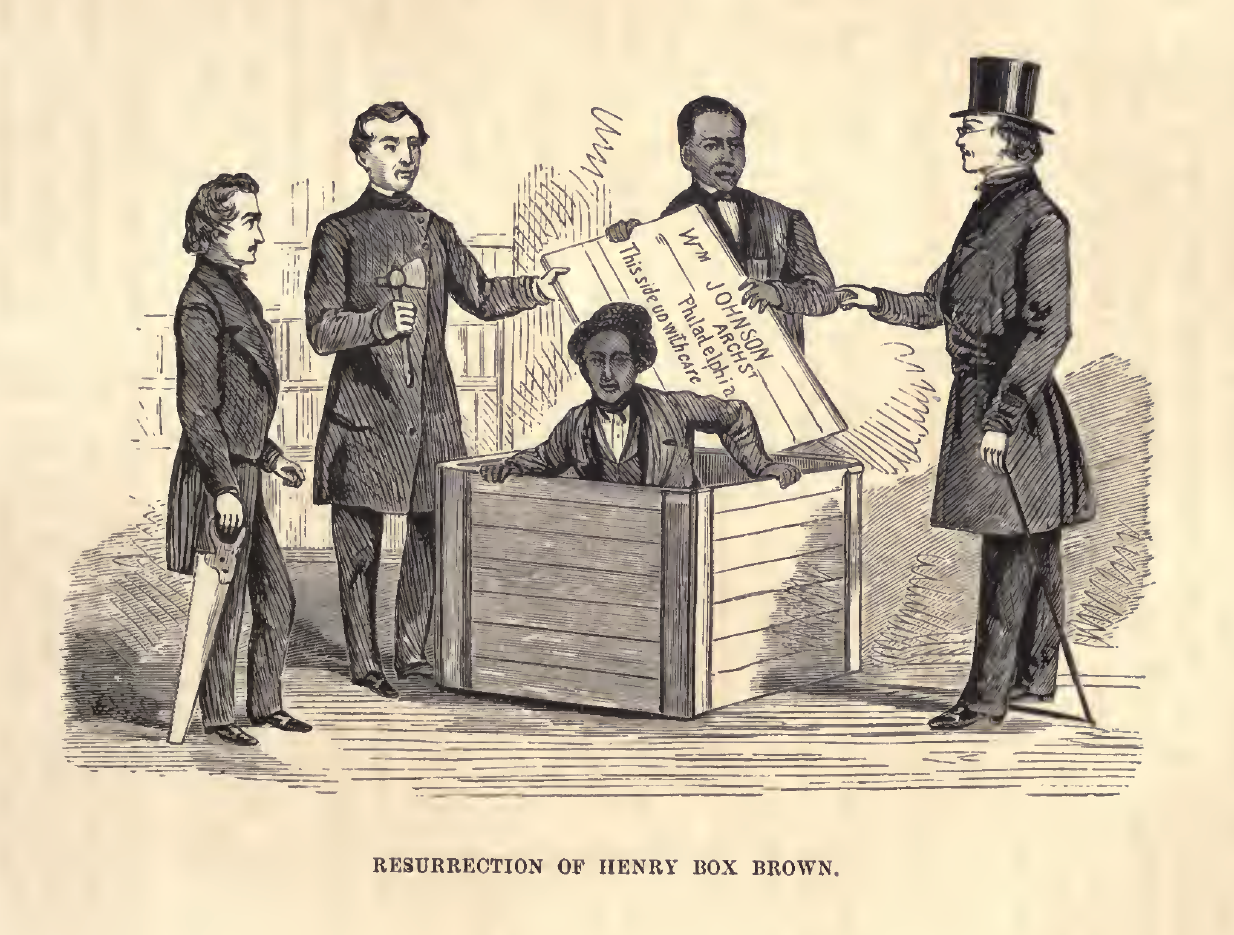
Henry Box Brown emerges from a box.

One chapter of the book- "The Escape Artist"- examines Henry Box Brown's performance of his escape from slavery. Brown was a slave in Virginia before he escaped to the free state of Philadelphia, Pennsylvania in 1850 by shipping himself in a box in which he hid for 27 hours. He wrote a narrative, Narrative of the life of Henry Box Brown, on his early life and his extraordinary escape from slavery. He was later invited to give stage performances of his escape story in England.

Brooks describes Brown's performance of his "traveling entrapment" in the box as "a metaphor of physical resistance to the antebellum period’s rigorous literal and figurative colonization of black bodies". "Literal colonization" is the institution's enslavement of Brown's body and "figurative colonization" is its simultaneous deprivation of his subjectivity. Brown begins to undergo his "self-making" process when the inevitable enslavement of his family evoked his desire for liberation and self-determination.

Singing is a significant tool of resistance in Brown's performance. Improvising on biblical verse to create his celebratory hymns, Brown's songs essentially express his hope and ecstasy for deliverance by God. In this sense, Brown subverts the institutional colonization of his blackness by utilizing sacred songs to create a transcendent free world.

Taking advantage of the institutional belief that African Americans are incapable of subjectivity-guided actions, Brown and his friends plotted his escape. They came up with a creative means of shipping Brown in a box. At the climax of the performance, Brown emerges from the box after its arrival in Philadelphia and became a free man. The emergence is symbolic of Brown's self-actualization as he is now a free man with subjectivity and the ability to determine his identity.

==== Reception ====
Bodies in Dissent is generally praised for having given a rich account of how African Americans use performance to express resistance against oppression by white-dominant institutions during the 19th and 20th centuries. Nevertheless, critic Sinéad Moynihan argues that Brooks fails to "demarcate the exact limits of the term "performance"", which threatens to "render (the study) both everything and nothing". The book won The Errol Hill Award for Outstanding Scholarship on African American Performance from ASTR.

=== Jeff Buckley’s Grace ===
Jeff Buckley’s Grace is a short work of non-fiction that examines Jeff Buckley's musical development from his early career to the release of his only full-length studio album. Brooks discovered Buckley's music while in graduate school. The inspiration of Jeff Buckley’s Grace comes from Brooks’ amusement at the white artist's ability to sing like different artists at different times: "I was amazed that this young, stunningly handsome white guy from Southern California could sing like Nina Simone one minute and sound like Robert Plant the next".

Brooks notes Buckley's music as being shaped by a ""wild elixir of discordant musical and cultural influences", from Nina Simone and Billie Holiday to Led Zeppelin and Queen to Emily Dickinson and Toni Morrison". In Brooks's words, Buckley embodied "cultural heterogeneity" and transformed the music of the 70s, 80s, and 90s into a distinct kind of music.
