= Lakeside Shopping Center =

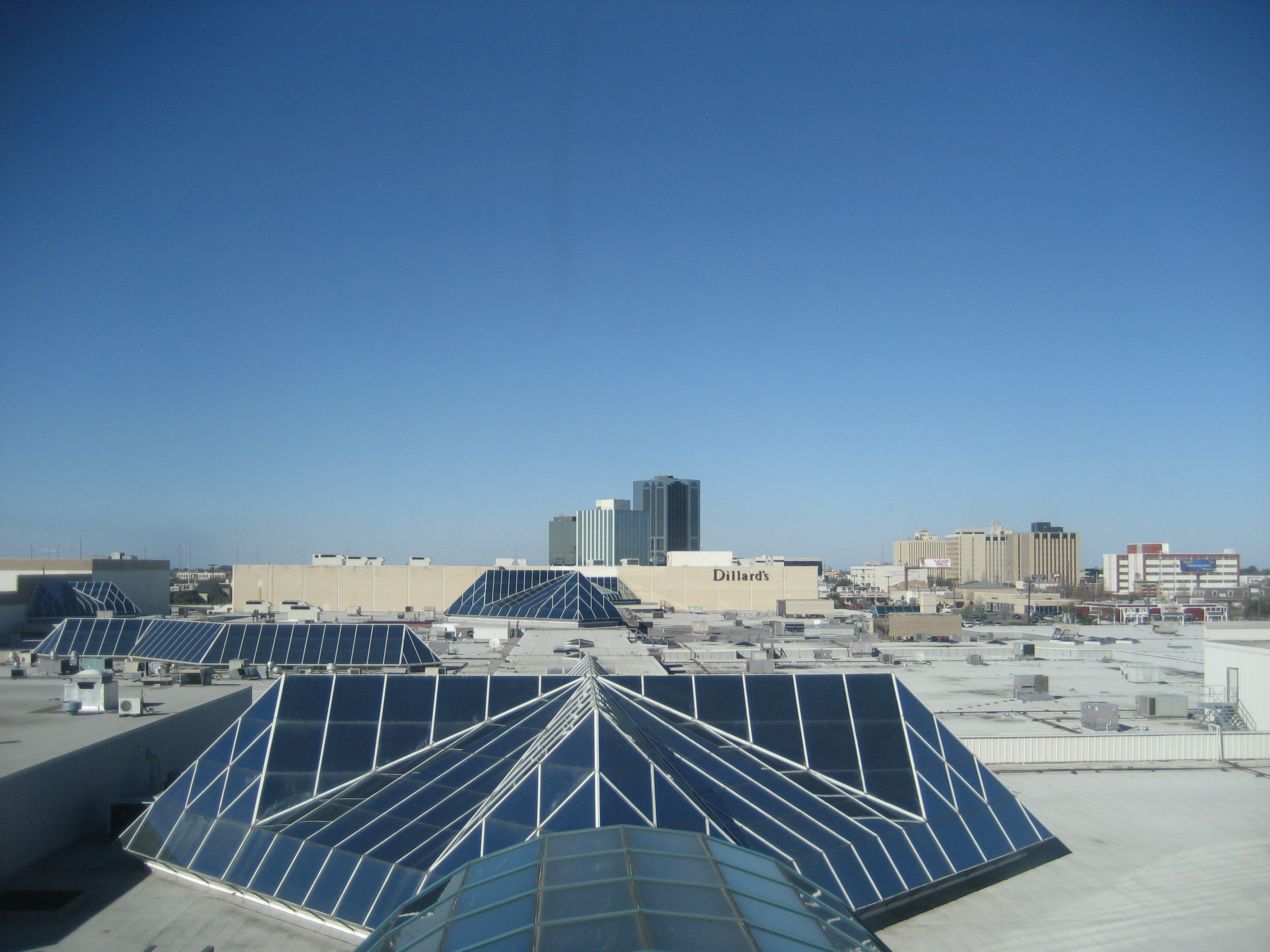
- Rooftop view from parking garage
- Location: Metairie, Louisiana, U.S.
- Coordinates: 30°0′23″N 90°9′26″W
- Opened: March 24, 1960
- Manager: The Feil Organization
- Owner: The Feil Organization
- Num. of stores: 108
- Num. of anchor tenants: 6
- Floor area: 967,000 sq ft (89,800 m^{2})
- Floors: 1 with partial upper level (3 in Dillard's and Macy's, 2 in JCPenney)
- Website: lakesideshopping.com

Lakeside Shopping Center, or simply Lakeside, is a shopping mall located at 3301 Veterans Memorial Boulevard in the New Orleans suburb of Metairie, Louisiana, United States. It opened on March 24, 1960 as the first regional shopping mall in New Orleans and is the largest and busiest mall in Greater New Orleans. Lakeside is a 967,000 sq ft (89,800 m^{2}) mall with five major retail anchors (Apple Store, Dillard's, Macy's, JCPenney, and Zara). There are also more than 120 stores and restaurants.

== History ==
The Mall opened in 1960 as an open air center with anchors, D. H. Holmes, JCPenney, and Godchaux's. The mall expanded to an enclosed mall in 1969. On November 5, 1975 JCPenney reopened as a new 2 level location which is still operating today. The old JCPenney was gutted for more stores, and the Mall turned into one of the biggest in the state. D. H. Holmes became Dillard's in 1989, and a new Food Court was added soon after. Another expansion soon happened with a New Macy's and a New Parking Garage was added. Macy's opened in 2008. And the latest expansion happened with the renovation of the Food Court and the opening of Zara.

== Anchors ==
- Dillard's (270,000 SF) (original anchor) - opened 1960 as D.H. Holmes, became Dillard's in 1989
- Macy's (228,000 SF) - opened 2008
- JCPenney (154,700 SF) (original anchor) - opened 1960
- Zara (34,700 SF) - opened 2014

== Former anchors ==
- Linens N Things

== Satellite ==
- Dick's Sporting Goods
- LOFT, a division of Ann Taylor (clothing retailer)

== Hurricane Katrina ==
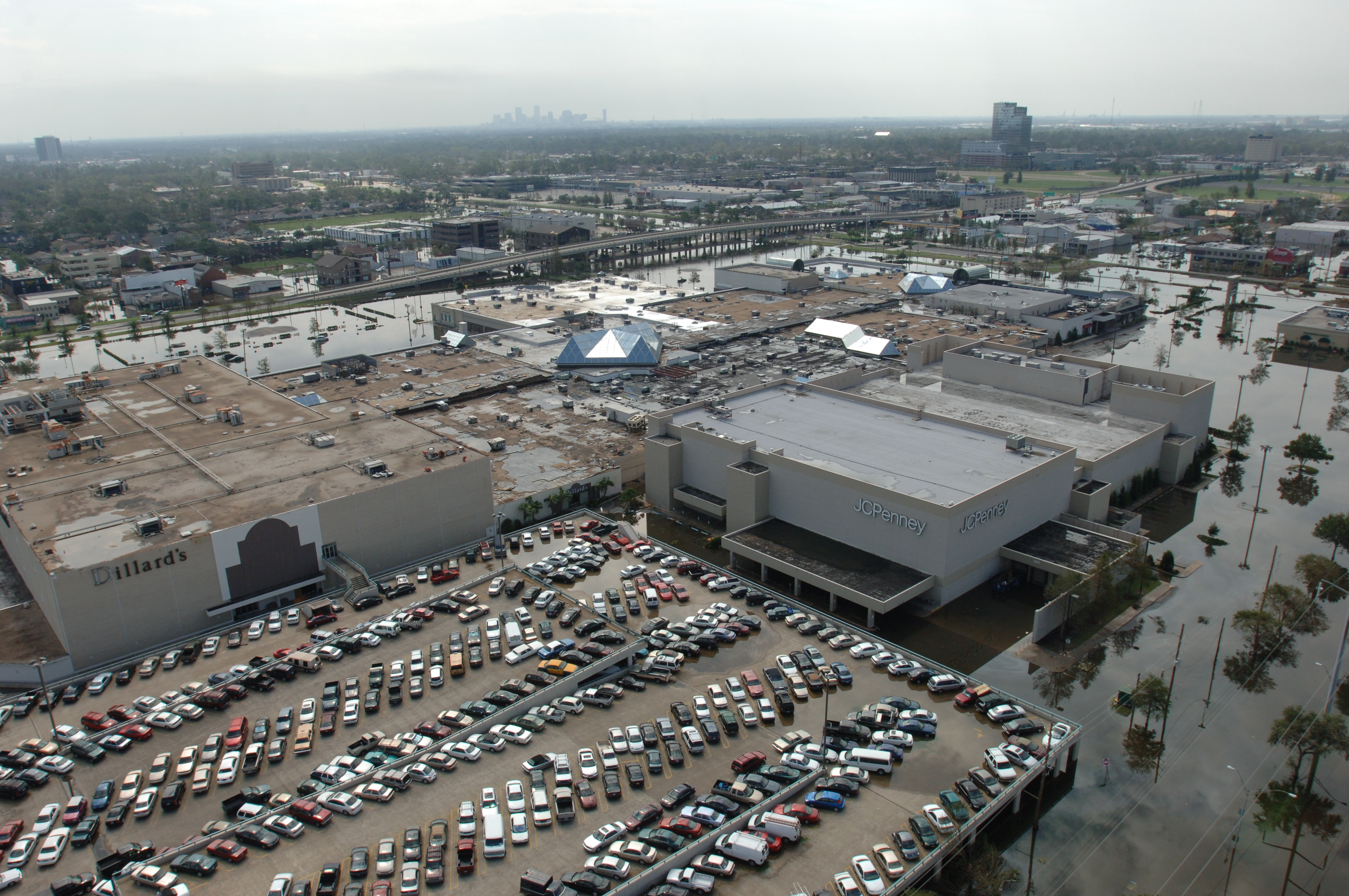
Lakeside in the immediate aftermath Hurricane Katrina

The mall suffered only minor damage from Hurricane Katrina.
