= Rutherford County Sheriff's Office =

Law enforcement agency in Tennessee, U.S.

- Abbreviation: RCSO

Agency overview
- Formed: 1804
- Employees: 385
- Annual budget: $711,566 (2021)

Jurisdictional structure
- Operations jurisdiction: Rutherford, Tennessee, United States
- Rutherford County Sheriff's Office jurisdiction
- Area: 624 square miles (1,620 km^{2})
- Population: 332,285 (2019)
- Legal jurisdiction: Rutherford County, Tennessee
- General nature: Local civilian police

Operational structure
- Headquarters: 940 New Salem Highway; Murfreesboro, Tennessee 37129, U.S.
- Agency executive: Mike Fitzhugh, Sheriff

Facilities
- Jails: 1

Website
- www.rcsotn.com

The Rutherford County Sheriff's Office (RCSO) is the primary law enforcement agency in Rutherford County, Tennessee. The RCSO is responsible for patrolling the 626-square miles of the County and its 250,000+ residents. The RCSO currently employs 178 sworn law enforcement officers and 135 Detention Officers as Deputy Sheriffs. The Rutherford County Sheriff's Office was founded in 1804 and Samuel McBride was elected the first sheriff. In the wake of former sheriff Robert Arnold's suspension from office, and subsequent federal corruption plea, the Rutherford County Commission appointed Mike Fitzhugh as interim sheriff on January 12, 2017.

== Sheriff Robert Arnold Controversy ==
On May 21, 2015, Sheriff Arnold and two others were the target of an FBI and Tennessee Bureau of Investigation raid related to a probe into financial and purchasing irregularities. His ownership and business interests in JailCigs was also being looked at for potential conflicts of interest by examiners from the Tennessee Comptroller's office. On May 27, 2016, Arnold, his Chief Administrator, Deputy Joe Russell, and Arnold's uncle were indicted on 14 charges by the FBI, including fraud and destruction of evidence. Rutherford County residents Steve Lane, Joe Liggett and Jacob Bogle have been seeking an ouster lawsuit since April 2015. Sheriff Arnold and Deputy Russell have pleaded not guilty and Arnold stated he intends to stay in office. Arnold was suspended without pay on November 14, 2016. The federal criminal trial of Arnold, Russell and Arnold's uncle, John Vanderveer, was set for February 7, 2017; while Arnold's civil ouster trial has been set for April 10, 2017. Deputy Russell reached a plea agreement where he would testify against his co-defendant Sheriff Arnold. Both pled guilty to 3 Felony counts with maximum prison terms of 20 years. November 14, 2012, wrongful arrest conducted by Rutherford County Sheriff's Office as a favor for the patent thief, Ward W. Brien at Sniper Tools Design Company, Estes Park, Colorado. Timmy Lee Green invented the Angle Degree Indicator. FBI currently investigating campaign unaccounted contributions to Republican Party in Tennessee.
