= Association of Independent Creative Editors =

Television editing organization

- Abbreviation: AICE
- Successor: Association of Independent Commercial Producers (AIOP)
- Formation: 1998
- Defunct: January 1, 2018
- Merger of: Association of Independent Commercial Producers
- Type: Nonprofit professional association
- Purpose: Represent editors of network television commercials in the US
- Location: New York City, United States
- Region served: United States and Canada
- Leader: Matt Miller
- Funding: Members fees
- Website: www.aice.org

The Association of Independent Creative Editors (AICE), was an American organization of 120 editorial companies representing over 600 editors throughout the United States and Toronto.

AICE had chapters in Chicago, Texas, Detroit, Los Angeles, Minneapolis, New York, San Francisco, and Toronto. It was merged in 2018 to form a single organization under the Association of Independent Commercial Producers name.

== History ==
The association was founded in 1998, when three independent groups representing editing companies in Chicago, Los Angeles, and New York joined to form a national organization.

In 2018, AICE merged with the Association of Independent Commercial Producers (AICE) to form one organization under the AICE name.

At the time of its merger with the AICP, editors who belonged to AICE were responsible, according to its website, for editing over 85% of all network television commercials shown in the U.S. and Canada.

== See also ==
- Re-cut trailers
