= Rae Sremmurd discography =

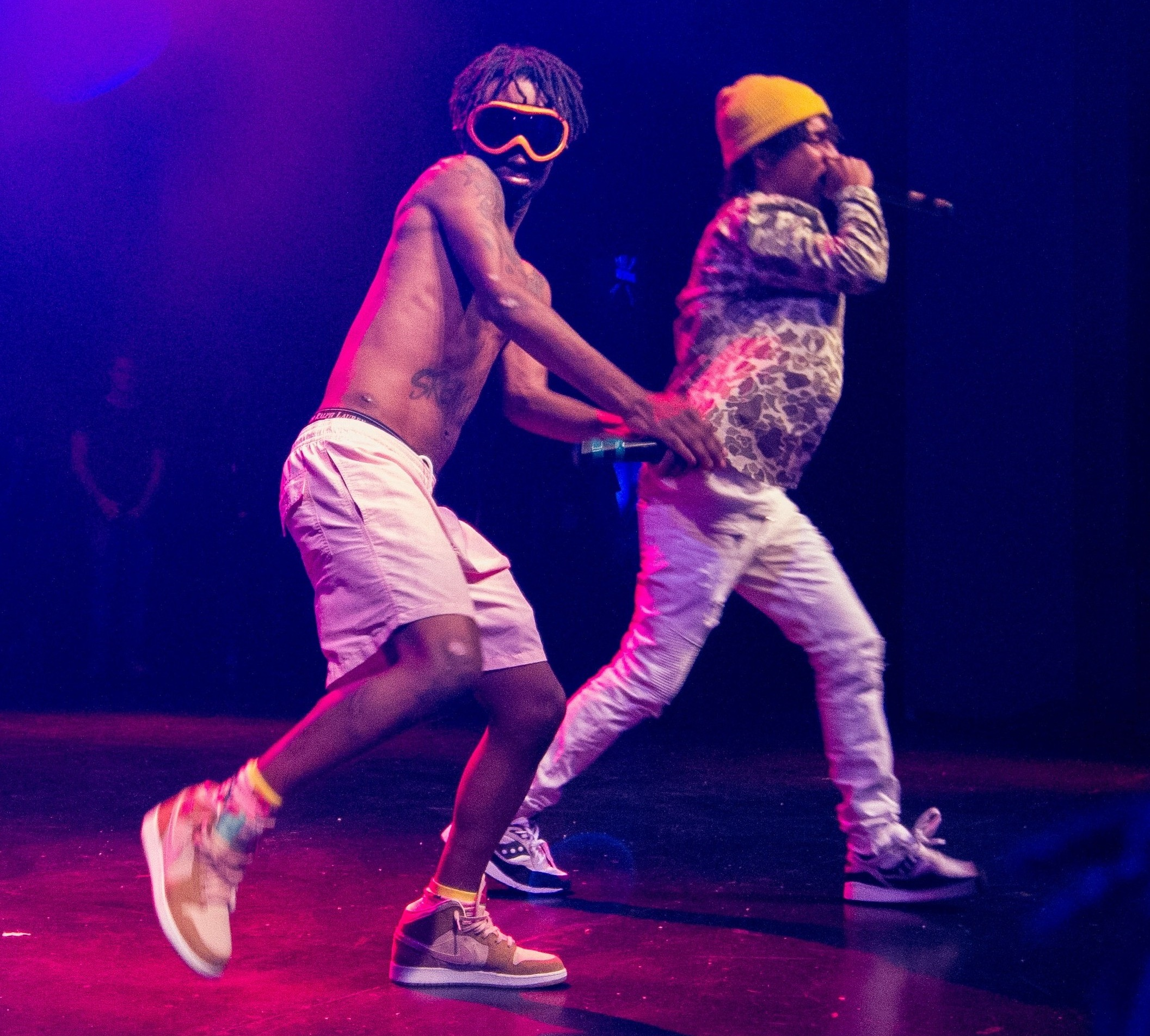
- Studio albums: 4
- Singles: 21
- Music videos: 29
- Mixtapes: 3

American hip hop duo Rae Sremmurd has released four studio albums, three mixtapes, twenty-two singles, ten as a featured artist, and 31 music videos. Rae Sremmurd signed to EarDrummers Entertainment in 2013 and released their debut studio album, SremmLife, on January 6, 2015. The album charted at number five on the US Billboard 200. It features the triple platinum single "No Type" and also includes the platinum singles "No Flex Zone", "Throw Sum Mo", "This Could Be Us" and "Come Get Her". Rae Sremmurd collaborated with Ty Dolla Sign and Future on platinum single "Blasé", which peaked at number 66 in the US. In 2016, they released their second studio album, SremmLife 2. The album peaked at number four in the US. It features the number-one single "Black Beatles", which peaked in the top ten of many charts worldwide. SremmLife 2 also includes the platinum hits "Look Alive" and "Swang". In 2018, they released their third studio album, SR3MM, which features the platinum singles "Powerglide" and "Guatemala." In 2023, SR3MM was followed up with their fourth studio album Sremm 4 Life.

== Albums ==
=== Studio albums ===
List of studio albums, with selected chart positions, certifications, and sales
Title	Album details	Peak chart positions										Certifications
Title	Album details	US	US R&B/HH	US Rap	AUS	CAN	DEN	FRA	NOR	SWE	UK	Certifications
SremmLife	Released: January 6, 2015; Label: EarDrummers, Interscope; Formats: CD, LP, digital download	5	1	1	—	13	22	—	37	60	—	RIAA: 2× Platinum; BPI: Silver; IFPI DEN: Platinum
SremmLife 2	Released: August 12, 2016; Label: EarDrummers, Interscope; Formats: CD, LP, digital download	4	3	2	83	14	7	92	31	55	—	RIAA: 2× Platinum; IFPI DEN: Gold; SNEP: Gold
SR3MM (as Rae Sremmurd and as Slim Jxmmi and Swae Lee)	Released: May 4, 2018; Label: EarDrummers, Interscope; Formats: Digital download	6	5	4	37	4	37	—	23	—	33	RIAA: Platinum; MC: Gold
Sremm 4 Life	Released: April 7, 2023; Label: EarDrummers, Interscope; Formats: CD, LP, digital download	28	11	7	—	—	—	—	—	—	—	

== Mixtapes ==
Title	Mixtape details
Party Animal (as Dem Outta St8 Boyz: CailBoy, Kid Krunk and Lil Pantz)	Released: 2011; Label: Self released; Format: CD
Three Stooges Mixtape (as Dem Outta St8 Boyz: Weirdo, Kid the Great and King Dre)	Released: January 8, 2012; Label: Self released; Format: Digital download
Trail Mix (as part of SremmLife Crew: D-JaySremm, Rae Sremmurd, Swae Lee, Slim Jxmmi, Riff 3X, Impxct)	Released: March 15, 2016; Label: SremmLife Crew; Format: Digital download

== Singles ==
=== As lead artist ===
List of singles as lead artist, with selected chart positions and certifications, showing year released and album name
Title	Year	Peak chart positions									Certifications	Album
Title	Year	US	US R&B/HH	US Rap	AUS	CAN	DEN	FRA	NZ	UK	Certifications	Album
"No Flex Zone"	2014	36	11	8	—	97	—	—	—	—	RIAA: 3× Platinum	SremmLife
"No Type"	2014	16	3	2	—	51	29	165	—	93	RIAA: 7× Platinum; ARIA: Platinum; BPI: Gold; IFPI DEN: Gold; RMNZ: Platinum	SremmLife
"Throw Sum Mo" (featuring Nicki Minaj and Young Thug)	2014	30	12	6	—	—	—	—	—	—	RIAA: 3× Platinum; RMNZ: Gold	SremmLife
"This Could Be Us"	2015	49	15	11	—	—	—	—	—	137	RIAA: 5× Platinum; BPI: Silver; IFPI DEN: Gold; RMNZ: Platinum	SremmLife
"Come Get Her"	2015	56	22	18	—	—	—	—	—	—	RIAA: 5× Platinum; BPI: Gold; IFPI DEN: Gold; RMNZ: Platinum	SremmLife
"By Chance"	2016	— (Note: "By Chance" did not enter the Billboard Hot 100, but peaked at number eight on the Bubbling Under Hot 100 Singles chart.)	39	25	—	—	—	—	—	—	RIAA: Platinum; IFPI DEN: Gold; SNEP: Gold	SremmLife 2
"Look Alive"	2016	72	26	19	—	—	—	—	—	—	RIAA: 2× Platinum	SremmLife 2
"Black Beatles" (featuring Gucci Mane)	2016	1	1	1	3	3	2	2	1	2	RIAA: Diamond; ARIA: 3× Platinum; BPI: 2× Platinum; IFPI DEN: Platinum; RMNZ: 2× Platinum; SNEP: Platinum	SremmLife 2
"Swang"	2017	26	13	9	—	41	—	—	—	—	RIAA: 6× Platinum; BPI: Silver; MC: Platinum; RMNZ: Platinum	SremmLife 2
"Perplexing Pegasus"	2017	84	36	—	—	64	—	—	— (Note: "Perplexing Pegasus" did not enter the NZ Top 40 Singles Chart, but peaked at number four on the NZ Heatseekers Singles Chart.)	—	RIAA: Platinum	SR3MM
"T'd Up"	2018	— (Note: "T'd Up" did not enter the Billboard Hot 100, but peaked at number 23 on the Bubbling Under Hot 100 Singles chart.)	— (Note: "T'd Up" did not enter the Hot R&B/Hip-Hop Songs chart, but peaked at number eight on the Bubbling Under R&B/Hip-Hop Singles chart.)	—	—	—	—	—	—	—		SR3MM
"Powerglide" (with Swae Lee and Slim Jxmmi featuring Juicy J)	2018	28	17	12	74	33	—	—	— (Note: "Powerglide" did not enter the NZ Top 40 Singles Chart, but peaked at number eight on the NZ Heatseeker Singles Chart.)	—	RIAA: 3× Platinum; ARIA: Gold; MC: Platinum; RMNZ: Gold	SR3MM
"Chanel" (with Swae Lee and Slim Jxmmi featuring Pharrell)	2018	—	—	—	—	—	—	—	—	—		SR3MM
"Guatemala" (with Swae Lee and Slim Jxmmi)	2018	84	39	—	—	39	—	—	— (Note: "Guatemala" did not enter the NZ Top 40 Singles Chart, but peaked at number nine on the NZ Heatseeker Singles Chart.)	68	RIAA: Platinum; BPI: Gold; MC: Platinum; RMNZ: Gold	SR3MM
"Close" (with Swae Lee and Slim Jxmmi featuring Travis Scott)	2018	98	48	—	—	71	—	—	— (Note: "Close" did not enter the NZ Top 40 Singles Chart, but peaked at number eight on the NZ Heatseeker Singles Chart.)	—	RIAA: Gold	SR3MM
"Christmas at Swae's"	2018	—	—	—	—	—	—	—	—	—		Non-album singles
"Nothing for Christmas"	2018	—	—	—	—	—	—	—	—	—		Non-album singles
"Denial"	2022	—	—	—	—	—	—	—	—	—		Non-album singles
"Community D**k" (featuring Flo Milli)	2022	—	—	—	—	—	—	—	—	—		Non-album singles
"Torpedo"	2022	—	—	—	—	—	—	—	— (Note: "Torpedo" did not enter the NZ Top 40 Singles Chart, but peaked at number 25 on the NZ Hot Singles Chart.)	—		Sremm 4 Life
"Sucka or Sum"	2023	—	—	—	—	—	—	—	—	—		Non-album single
"Tanisha (Pump That)"	2023	—	—	—	—	—	—	—	— (Note: "Tanisha (Pump That)" did not enter the NZ Top 40 Singles Chart, but peaked at number 40 on the NZ Hot Singles Chart.)	—		Sremm 4 Life
"—" denotes a recording that did not chart.

=== As featured artist ===
List of singles as featured artist, with year released, selected chart positions, certifications, and album name
Title	Year	Peak chart positions			Certifications	Album
Title	Year	US	US R&B/HH	US Rap	Certifications	Album
"One Touch" (Baauer featuring AlunaGeorge and Rae Sremmurd)	2014	—	—	—		ß
"Blasé" (Ty Dolla $ign featuring Future and Rae Sremmurd)	2015	63	20	15	RIAA: 2× Platinum; RMNZ: Gold	Free TC
"Perfect Pint" (Mike Will Made It featuring Kendrick Lamar, Gucci Mane and Rae Sremmurd)	2017	—	— (Note: "Perfect Pint" did not enter the Hot R&B/Hip-Hop Songs chart, but peaked at number six on the Bubbling Under R&B/Hip-Hop chart.)	—		Ransom 2
"Pere" (Davido featuring Rae Sremmurd and Young Thug)	2017	—	—	—		Non-album singles
"Love" (ILoveMakonnen featuring Rae Sremmurd)	2017	—	—	—		Non-album singles
"Sativa" (Jhené Aiko featuring Rae Sremmurd or Swae Lee)	2018	74	32	—	RIAA: 5× Platinum	Trip
"Hands on Me" (Burns featuring Maluma and Rae Sremmurd)	2018	—	—	—		Non-album singles
"Aries (Yugo)" (Mike Will Made It featuring Big Sean, Pharrell, Quavo and Rae Sremmurd)	2018	—	—	—		Non-album singles
"Sober" (Afrojack featuring Rae Sremmurd and Stanaj)	2019	—	—	—		Non-album singles
"Finger Food" (Rolling Loud featuring Rae Sremmurd and Duke Deuce)	2022	—	—	—		Non-album singles
"—" denotes a recording that did not chart.

=== Promotional singles ===
List of promotional singles, with selected chart positions, showing year released and album name
Title	Year	Peak chart positions			Certifications	Album
Title	Year	US Bub.	US R&B/HH	US Rap	Certifications	Album
"We"	2014	—	—	—		#MikeWillBeenTrill
"No Flex Zone" (Remix) (featuring Nicki Minaj and Pusha T)	2014	—	—	—		Non-album single
"Up Like Trump"	2014	16	42	15	RIAA: Gold	SremmLife
"Blasé" (Louis The Child Remix) (Ty Dolla $ign and Louis the Child featuring Future and Rae Sremmurd)	2015	—	—	—		Non-album singles
"Blasé" (Whethan Remix) (Ty Dolla $ign and Whethan featuring Future and Rae Sremmurd)	2015	—	—	—		Non-album singles
"Over Here"	2016	—	—	—		SremmLife 2
"Doggin'" (with Jay Sremm and Riff 3x)	2016	—	—	—		Trail Mix
"Set the Roof" (featuring Lil Jon)	2016	—	—	—		SremmLife 2
"Rowdy"	2016	—	—	—		Non-album singles
"Look Alive" (Remix) (featuring Migos)	2016	—	—	—		Non-album singles
"Look Alive" (Sam Spiegel & Tropkillaz Remix) (Sam Spiegel & Tropkillaz featuring Rae Sremmurd)	2016	—	—	—		Non-album singles
"Black Beatles" (Madsonik Remix) (with Madsonik)	2017	—	—	—		Non-album singles
"Come Down" (Mike Will Made It featuring Chief Keef and Rae Sremmurd)	2017	—	—	—		Ransom 2
"Young Dumb & Broke" (Remix) (Khalid featuring Rae Sremmurd and Lil Yachty)	2017	—	—	—		Non-album single
"—" denotes a recording that did not chart.

== Other charted songs ==
List of other charted songs, with selected chart positions, showing year released and album name
Title	Year	Peak chart positions		Album
Title	Year	US R&B/HH	NZ Hot	Album
"Real Chill" (featuring Kodak Black)	2017	— (Note: "Real Chill" did not enter the Hot R&B/Hip-Hop Songs chart, but peaked at number nine on the Bubbling Under R&B/Hip-Hop chart.)	—	SremmLife 2
"Not So Bad (Leans Gone Cold)"	2023	—	26	Sremm 4 Life
"—" denotes a recording that did not chart.

== Guest appearances ==
List of non-single guest appearances, with other performing artists, showing year released and album name
Title	Year	Other performer(s)	Album
"Already"	2015	Juicy J	Blue Dream & Lean 2
"Get Low" (Remix)	2015	Dillon Francis, DJ Snake	Money Sucks, Friends Rule
"White Iverson" (Remix)	2015	Post Malone, French Montana	—N/a
"Jam On Em"	2016	PeeWee Longway, Bloody Jay	Money, Pounds, Ammunition 3
"Party Pack"	2016	DJ Esco, Future	Project E.T.
"Hard Way"	2017	DJ Mustard, RJ	The Ghetto
"Shine Hard"	2018	Lil Xan	Total Xanarchy
"Watching Me"	2018	Kodak Black	Creed II: The Album

== Music videos ==
On March 16, 2017, Rae Sremmurd received the YouTube Silver and Gold Play Buttons for surpassing 100,000 and one million subscribers respectively on their Vevo account on YouTube.

List of music videos, showing year released and directors
Year	Title	Director(s)	Artist(s)	Ref.
As main performers
2013	"Just Like You" (as Dem Outta St8 Boyz)	Marcus Shorter	—N/a	
2014	"No Flex Zone"	Mike Waxx, Yung Jake and Mike Will Made It	—N/a	
2014	"No Type"	Max "Directed by Max" Hliva	—N/a	
2014	"Illest Walking"	Max "Directed by Max" Hliva	—N/a	
2014	"Up Like Trump"	Max "Directed by Max" Hliva	—N/a	
2015	"Lit Like Bic"	Max "Directed by Max" Hliva	—N/a	
2015	"Throw Sum Mo"	Motion Family and Mike Will Made It	featuring Nicki Minaj and Young Thug	
2015	"This Could Be Us"	Max "Directed by Max" Hliva and Mike Will Made It	—N/a	
2015	"Come Get Her"	Motion Family	—N/a	
2016	"Doggin'"	Max "Directed by Max" Hliva	with Jay Sremm and Riff 3x	
2016	"By Chance"	Max "Directed by Max" Hliva and Mike Will Made It	—N/a	
2016	"Over Here"	James Larese	—N/a	
2016	"Look Alive"	Max "Directed by Max" Hliva	—N/a	
2016	"Set the Roof"	Grant Singer	featuring Lil Jon	
2016	"Start a Party"	Max "Directed by Max" Hliva	—N/a	
2016	"Black Beatles"	Motion Family	featuring Gucci Mane	
2016	"Shake It Fast"	Max "Directed by Max" Hliva	featuring Juicy J	
2016	"Now That I Know"	Max "Directed by Max" Hliva	—N/a	
2016	"Real Chill"	Max "Directed by Max" Hliva	featuring Kodak Black	
2017	"Swang"	Max "Directed by Max" Hliva	—N/a	
2017	"Perplexing Pegasus"	Tomás Whitmore	—N/a	
2018	"CLOSE"	Mike Piscitelli	featuring Travis Scott	
2018	"Powerglide"	Andy Hines	featuring Juicy J	
2018	"Guatemala"	—N/a	—N/a	
2018	"Christmas at Swae's"	Niall O'Brien; Mike Will Made It	—N/a	
2018	"Nothing For Christmas"	Max for ORG; Mike Will Made It	—N/a	
2022	"Denial"	Bryan Barber	—N/a	
2022	"Community D**k"	Bryan Barber	featuring Flo Milli	
2022	"Torpedo"	Mike Will Made It	—N/a	
2023	"Sucka or Sum"	Matt Swinsky	—N/a	
2023	"Not So Bad (Leans Gone Cold)"	Michael Gilbert	—N/a	
2023	"Sexy"	Ethan Iverson	—N/a	
As featured performers
2015	"Already"	Gabriel Hart	Juicy J featuring Rae Sremmurd	
2015	"Blasé"	Alex Bittan and Ty Dolla $ign	Ty Dolla $ign featuring Future and Rae Sremmurd	
2017	"Perfect Pint"	Nabil Elderkin	Mike Will Made It featuring Kendrick Lamar, Rae Sremmurd and Gucci Mane	
2017	"Pere"	Sesan	Davido featuring Rae Sremmurd and Young Thug	
