= Mike Will Made It production discography =

Hip hop record producer production discography

The following list is a discography of production by Mike WiLL Made It, an American hip hop record producer from Atlanta, Georgia. It includes a list of songs produced, co-produced and remixed by year, artist, album and title. He has produced multiple singles certified gold or higher by the Recording Industry Association of America (RIAA), including two US Billboard number one hit singles.

== Singles produced ==
List of singles produced, with selected chart positions and certifications, showing year released and album name
Title	Year	Peak chart positions								Certifications	Album
Title	Year	US	US R&B	US Rap	AUS	CAN	FRA	NLD	UK	Certifications	Album
"Tupac Back" (Meek Mill featuring Rick Ross)	2011	—	31	22	—	—	—	—	—		Self Made Vol. 1
"Ain't No Way Around It" (DJ Drama featuring Future)	2011	—	48	—	—	—	—	—	—		Third Power
"Way Too Gone" (Young Jeezy featuring Future)	2012	—	87	—	—	—	—	—	—		Thug Motivation 103: Hustlerz Ambition
"Turn on the Lights" (Future)	2012	50	2	4	—	—	—	—	—	RIAA: Platinum	Pluto
"Mercy" (Kanye West, Big Sean, Pusha T and 2 Chainz)	2012	13	1	1	60	46	101	—	55	RIAA: 7× Platinum	Cruel Summer
"No Lie" (2 Chainz featuring Drake)	2012	24	1	1	—	—	—	—	—	RIAA: 3× Platinum	Based on a T.R.U. Story
"Itchin' (DJ Infamous featuring Future)	2012	—	85	—	—	—	—	—	—		
"Bandz A Make Her Dance" (Juicy J featuring Lil Wayne and 2 Chainz)	2012	29	6	5	—	—	—	—	—	RIAA: Platinum	Stay Trippy
"Neva End (Remix)" (Future featuring Kelly Rowland)	2012	52	14	11	—	—	—	—	—		Pluto 3D
"Pour It Up" (Rihanna)	2013	19	6	—	55	49	81	—	43	RIAA: 3× Platinum	Unapologetic
"We Still in This Bitch" (B.o.B featuring T.I. and Juicy J)	2013	66	19	15	—	67	—	—	—	RIAA: Platinum	Fuck 'Em We Ball and Underground Luxury
"Love Me" (Lil Wayne featuring Future and Drake)	2013	9	4	3	92	49	27	79	44	RIAA: 7× Platinum	I Am Not a Human Being II
"Show Out" (Juicy J featuring Big Sean and Young Jeezy)	2013	74	24	17	—	—	—	—	—		Stay Trippy
"Bugatti" (Ace Hood featuring Future and Rick Ross)	2013	33	9	8	—	—	—	—	—	RIAA: Platinum	Trials & Tribulations
"Kisses Down Low" (Kelly Rowland)	2013	72	25	—	—	—	—	—	—	RIAA: Gold	Talk a Good Game
"Body Party" (Ciara)	2013	22	6	—	—	—	—	—	174	RIAA: 2× Platinum	Ciara
"We Can't Stop" (Miley Cyrus)	2013	2	—	—	4	3	26	54	1	RIAA: 3× Platinum; ARIA: 3× Platinum; BPI: Platinum; MC: 4× Platinum; RMNZ: Platinum	Bangerz
"23" (Mike WiLL Made It featuring Miley Cyrus, Wiz Khalifa and Juicy J)	2013	11	3	2	39	26	31	—	85	RIAA: 4× Platinum	Bangerz (10th anniversary edition)
"Sh!t" (Future)	2013	107	34	—	—	—	—	—	—		Honest
"Win Win" (B. Smyth featuring Future)	2013	—	—	—	—	—	—	—	—		The Florida Files
"Real and True" (Future featuring Miley Cyrus and Mr. Hudson)	2013	103	32	—	—	—	—	—	92		non-album single
"War Ready" (Rick Ross featuring Jeezy)	2014	—	49	—	—	—	—	—	—		Mastermind
"Move That Dope" (Future featuring Pusha T, Pharrell and Casino)	2014	46	13	7	—	—	—	—	—	RIAA: Platinum	Honest
"No Flex Zone!" (Rae Sremmurd)	2014	36	11	8	—	—	—	—	—	RIAA: 3× Platinum	SremmLife
"Buy the World" (Mike WiLL Made It featuring Future, Lil Wayne and Kendrick Lamar)	2014	—	42	—	—	—	—	—	—		Ransom
"No Type" (Rae Sremmurd)	2014	16	4	3	—	51	—	—	93	RIAA: 6× Platinum	SremmLife
"Throw Sum Mo" (Rae Sremmurd featuring Nicki Minaj and Young Thug)	2014	30	12	6	—	—	—	—	—	RIAA: 3× Platinum	SremmLife
"Paradise" (Big Sean)	2015	99	34	23	—	—	—	—	—	RIAA: Platinum	Dark Sky Paradise
"This Could Be Us" (Rae Sremmurd)	2015	49	14	11	—	—	—	—	—	RIAA: 4× Platinum	SremmLife
"Formation" (Beyoncé)	2016	10	33	—	17	32	24	—	31	RIAA: 3× Platinum	Lemonade
"H.G.T.V." (Pusha T)	2016	—	—	—	—	—	—	—	—		King Push
"Black Beatles" (Rae Sremmurd featuring Gucci Mane)	2016	1	1	1	3	3	2	8	2	RIAA: 8× Platinum; ARIA: 2× Platinum; BPI: Gold; IFPI NOR: Platinum; RMNZ: Gold; SNEP: Gold	SremmLife 2
"Black Barbies" (Nicki Minaj with Mike WiLL Made-It)	2016	65	30	20	47	78	—	–	–		Non-album single
"Gucci on My" (Mike WiLL Made It featuring 21 Savage, YG and Migos)	2017	— (Note: "Gucci on My" did not enter the Billboard Hot 100, but peaked at number 10 on the Bubbling Under Hot 100 Singles chart.)	41	—	—	—	—	—	—		Ransom 2
"Humble" (Kendrick Lamar)	2017	1	1	1	2	2	21	16	6	RIAA: 7× Platinum; ARIA: 3× Platinum; BEA: Platinum; BPI: Silver; FIMI: Gold; GLF: Platinum; MC: 5× Platinum; RMNZ: 2× Platinum; SNEP: Gold	Damn
"DNA" (Kendrick Lamar)	2017	4	3	2	16	3	39	31	18	RIAA: 3× Platinum	Damn
"Bang bang" (Mike WiLL Made It with Chief Keef)	2020	—	—	—	—	—	—	—	—		TBA
"What That Speed Bout!?" (Mike WiLL Made It with Nicki Minaj and YoungBoy Never Broke Again)	2020	35	11	10	—	76	—	—	—		Michael
"Tanisha (Pump That)" (Rae Sremmurd)	2023	—	—	—	—	—	—	—	—		Sremm 4 Life
"Dirty Nachos" (Chief Keef and Mike WiLL Made-It)	2024	—	—	—	—	—	—	—	—		Non-album single
"Mogul Mode (Ready to Shoot)" (Future)	2024	—	—	—	—	—	—	—	—		Non-album single
"Wanna Come Thru" (Coi Leray)	2024	—	—	—	—	—	—	—	—		Non-album single
"—" denotes a recording that did not chart or was not released in that territory.

== Other production ==
Artist(s)	Year	Album	Songs
Gucci Mane & Shawty Lo	2007	Guapaholics	04. "I Smoke Kush (I Pop Beans)"; 07. "Star Status"
Gucci Mane	2007	No Pad, No Pencil	02. "East Atlanta 6"
Gucci Mane	2008	The Movie	10. "Kill the Parking Lot"
Gucci Mane	2008	So Icey Boy (Disc 2)	08. "If Ya Girl Choose" (featuring Yung Joc); 10. "Papered Up" (featuring DJ Speedy)
Gucci Mane	2008	Wilt Chamberlain	21. "I Smoke Kush"
OJ Da Juiceman	2008	Culinary Art School	03. "9 in the Morning" (featuring Bolo & El Dorado Red); 14. "Hood Proud of Me"
Shawty Lo	2009	Carlito's Way (Unofficial Mixtape)	15. "Roll he Dice"
Ms.Go Ham	2009	DJ Zazu & Jonay Presents Dat Duffy Vol. 1	14. "No Money" (featuring Waka Flocka Flame)
Eldorado Red	2009	Black Gangster	06. "Boomin on U Hoes"
Waka Flocka Flame & Slim Dunkin	2009	Twin Towers	03. "Let's Do It Let's Go"
Waka Flocka Flame	2009	Salute Me or Shoot Me 2	12. "Wheew!" (featuring Slim Dunkin, BC, & Cap)
Soulja Boy	2009	My Way Of Life	24. "Bandz"
Soulja Boy	2009	DatPiff (The Mixtape)	02. "I'm So Fucking Gully"
Tity Boi	2009	All Ice on Me	Disc 1: 07. "24/7"; Disc 2: 03. "Trickin Off" (featuring M Beezy)
Tity Boi	2010	Me Against the World 2 (Codeine Withdrawal)	14. "Go & Get It"
Tity Boi	2010	Trap-A-Velli 2 (The Residue)	12. "Goin' Thru It"
Eldorado Red	2010	Black Gangster 2	05. "Mount Up" (featuring Bambino Gold); 06. "The Recipe" (featuring Fat Boy Grizzy); 07. "Hit Me on My Burna" (featuring Tity Boi & Nephew); 08. "Drugs & Money" (featuring Scragg Lee & Jah Fisher); 09. "Trap House" (featuring Bambino Gold); 14. "Half a Birdy" (featuring Yung Ralph)
Eldorado Red & Bambino Gold	2010	Warning Shots	08. "Trap House"
OJ Da Juiceman	2010	O.R.A.N.G.E.	05. "Penis" (featuring Lil Dre)
OJ Da Juiceman	2010	The Realest Nigga I Know	04. "20,40"
Tity Boi	2011	Codeine Cowboy (A 2 Chainz Collective)	10. "Lala" (featuring Busta Rhymes)
YG Hootie	2011	Fonk Love (Flight to Da Motherland)	16. "142"
E-Pistol	2011	Ride with Me (The Right 2 Travel)	10. "Bubblin'"
Waka Flocka & Slim Dunkin	2011	Twin Towers 2 (No Fly Zone)	16. "Baddest in the Room"
Starlito & Don Trip	2011	Step Brothers	01. "Boats N Hoes"
Maybach Music Group	2011	Self Made Vol. 1	02. "Tupac Back" (Meek Mill featuring Rick Ross) (co-produced by Marz)
Gucci Mane & Future	2011	Free Bricks	01. "Gucci Terintino"; 05. "Nasty"; 08. "Lost It" (featuring 2 Chainz); 10. "Can't Turn Me Down"; 11. "Radical"
32 Ent	2011	The Compilation	10. "6,15 Tony Bandz" (featuring Lil DRE & OJ Da Juiceman)
DJ Drama	2011	Third Power	04. "Ain't No Way Around It" (featuring Future)
Ludacris	2011	1.21 Gigawatts: Back to the First Time	11. "I'm on Fire" (featuring Big K.R.I.T.)
2 Chainz	2011	T.R.U. REALigion	02. "Got One"
Yung Joey	2011	The 6th Man	02. "2K12"; 07. "She Thick" (featuring Slim Dunkin, Wooh Da Kid & Frenchie); 08. "Bivolotti"; 09. "Man Down"; 12. "European" (featuring Gucci Mane); 15. "I'm Going to Jail"
Young Jeezy	2011	Thug Motivation 103: Hustlerz Ambition	05. "Way Too Gone" (featuring Future) (co-produced by Marz)
Young Jeezy	2011	The Real Is Back 2	8. "Nicks 2 Bricks" (featuring Freddie Gibbs); 10."Sittin low" (featuring Scrilla & Freddie Gibbs)
Freddie Gibbs	2011	Cold Day in Hell	17. "Sittin' Low" (featuring Young Jeezy & Scrilla)
Future	2011	Dirty Sprite	02. "Dirty Sprite"
Future	2012	Astronaut Status	20. "Itchin'"
Future	2012	Pluto	07. "Truth Gonna Hurt You" (co-produced by A+); 08. "Neva End" (co-produced by P-Nazty); 14. "Turn on the Lights" (co-produced by Marz)
Yo Gotti	2012	Live from the Kitchen	07. "Cases" (featuring 2 Chainz)
Eldorado Red	2012	McRado's 2	06. "Ocean Front View" (featuring Gorilla Zoe & Bambino Gold)
Rick Ross	2012	Rich Forever	15. "King of Diamonds"
Obie Trice	2012	Watch the Chrome	09. "Big Proof Back"
Gucci Mane	2012	Trap Back	04. "Walking Lick" (featuring Waka Flocka Flame); 05. "Plane Jane" (featuring Rocko); 06. "Get It Back" (featuring 2 Chainz); 16. "Okay with Me" (featuring 2 Chainz); 19. "North Pole"
Gucci Mane	2012	I'm Up	03. "Trap Boomin" (featuring Rick Ross); 14. "Scarface" (featuring Scarface); 15. "Gucci Freestyle"; 20. "Too Sexy" (featuring Jeremih); 21. "Plane Jane (Remix)" (featuring Rocko & T.I.)
Gucci Mane	2012	Trap God	06. "Rolly Up" (featuring Young Scooter and Waka Flocka Flame); 07. "Fuck the World" (featuring Future); 15. "Don't Trust" (featuring Young Scooter); 19. "I Fuck with That" (co-produced by Southside with additional production by Da Honorable C.N.O.T.E.)
Schoolboy Q	2012	Habits & Contradictions	06. "My Hatin' Joint"
B.o.B.	2012	Strange Clouds	13. "Just a Sign" (featuring Playboy Tre) (co-produced by P-Nazty)
50 Cent	2012	The Lost Tape	07. "OJ" (featuring Kidd Kidd)
Sylver Karatz	2012	Bad Bitches Only	11. "His & Hers" (featuring Young Butta)
Jeremih	2012	Late Nights	08. "773 Love"; 13. "Girls Go Wild"
Shawty Lo	2012	Million Dollar Man	16. "No Secrets" (featuring Rav Money)
Yung Ralph	2012	Juugman Reloaded	02. "Money Maker"
2 Chainz	2012	Based on a T.R.U. Story	04. "No Lie" (featuring Drake) (produced with Noah "40" Shebib and co-produced by Marz); 13. "Wut We Doin" (featuring Cap1) (co-produced by Marz)
NAKIM	2012	YNWA+$	04. "Young & Wild" (featuring Marty)
Ace Hood	2012	Body Bag, Vol. 2	03. "Leggo"
DJ Khaled	2012	Kiss the Ring	02. "Bitches & Bottles" (featuring Lil Wayne, Future & T.I.) (co-produced by Marz)
Bambino Gold	2012	Fuck Being Indicted	13. "Star Like Me"
Brandy	2012	Two Eleven	10. "Do You Know What You Have?" (co-produced by P-Nazty)
Pharoah	2012	Pay 2 Play	05. "Ain't Got Sense"
Rihanna	2012	Unapologetic	04. "Pour It Up" (co-produced by JBo)
Chief Keef	2012	Finally Rich	04. "No Tomorrow"(co-produced by A+)
Plies	2012	On Trial 2	13. "My Bitch"
Gutta TV	2012	Strap & Camera	09. "Talking Bout" (featuring J Money & Jody Breeze)
Daz Dillinger	2012	Witit Witit	02. "Street Money"
Young Jeezy	2012	It's tha World	14. "Tonight" (featuring Trey Songz)
Juvenile	2012	Juvie Tuesdays	02. "Picture Perfect" (featuring Birdman & Lil Wayne)
Mike WiLL Made It	2012	Est. in 1989 (Part 2.5)	All tracks
DJ Infamous	2012	Non-album single	01. "Itchin'" (featuring Future); 02. "Itchin' Remix" (featuring Future, Young Jeezy, Yo Gotti & Fabolous)
2 Chainz	2012	Non-album single	00. "Own Drugz" (featuring Juicy J & Cap1)
Chief Keef, Future, Fredo Santana & SD	2012	Non-album single	00. "Dead Broke"
Travis Porter	2012	"Mr. Porter (Mixtape)"	18. "Pocket Watchers"
Future	2013	F.B.G.: The Movie	02. "Fo Real" (featuring Drake)
Gucci Mane	2013	Trap God 2	11. "Rich Muthafucka"; 13. "Greasy"
Gucci Mane	2013	Trap Back 2	03. "Playin' with the Money"; 10. "That Pack" (featuring Travis Porter)
Gucci Mane & Young Scooter	2013	Free Bricks 2	10. "Faces"
Gucci Mane (with Zaytoven, Honorable C.N.O.T.E., Mike Will Made-It)	2013	World War 3: Lean	1. Intro (World War 3, Vol. 1: Lean) (featuring Peewee Longway & Young Thug); 4. More of That; 5. Blue Face Rollie; 10. No More (featuring 2 Chainz); 11. Don't Have a Chance (featuring Bobby V); 13. That Pack (featuring Travis Porter); 16. Don't Trust (featuring Waka Flocka Flame & Young Scooter); 17. Don't Save No Bitches (featuring Bankroll Fresh); 18. Faces (featuring Young Scooter)
B.o.B	2013	Underground Luxury	15. "We Still in This Bitch"
Fredo Santana	2013	Fredo Kruger	16. "Dead Broke" (featuring SD, Chief Keef & Future)
Brianna Perry	2013	Symphony No. 9: The B Collection	15. "Oh You Mad" (featuring Alja)
Lil Wayne	2013	I Am Not a Human Being II	11. "Bitches Love Me" (featuring Future & Drake) (co-produced by A+)
Slice 9	2013	Non-album single	00. "Another One" (featuring Future, Levi Leer)
Cassie	2013	RockaByeBaby	03. "Take Care of Me Baby" (featuring Pusha T)(produced with Rob Holladay)
Ciara	2013	Ciara	03. "Body Party" (co-produced by P-Nazty); 08. "Where You Go" (featuring Future) (co-produced by P-Nazty)
French Montana	2013	Excuse My French	16. "Marble Floors" (featuring Rick Ross, Lil Wayne & 2 Chainz)
Dorrough Music	2013	Shut the City Down	17. "What the Hell" (featuring Prime Time Click)
Ludacris	2013	#IDGAF	06. "Speak Into the Mic"
Trae tha Truth	2013	Banned	00. "Screwed Up" (featuring Future)
Kelly Rowland	2013	Talk a Good Game	02. "Kisses Down Low"(co-produced by Marz); 15. "#1"(co-produced by Marz)
Jay-Z	2013	Magna Carta Holy Grail	12. "Beach Is Better" (Interlude) (co-produced by Marz)
Juicy J	2013	Stay Trippy	01. "Stop It" (co-produced by Marz); 08. "Smoke a Nigga" (featuring Wiz Khalifa); 09. "Show Out" (featuring Young Jeezy & Big Sean) (co-produced by JBo); 14. "Bandz a Make Her Dance" (featuring Lil Wayne & 2 Chainz) (co-produced by JBo)
Ace Hood	2013	Trials & Tribulations	11. "Bugatti" (featuring Rick Ross & Future)
Juvenile	2013	Non-album single	00. "Mo Money" (featuring Curren$y)
2 Chainz	2013	B.O.A.T.S. II: Me Time	01. "Fork" (co-produced by P-Nazty); 04. "Where U Been?" (featuring Cap.1) (co-produced by Marz)
Miley Cyrus	2013	Bangerz	02. "We Can't Stop" (co-produced by P-Nazty); 03. "SMS (Bangerz)" (featuring Britney Spears) (co-produced by Marz); 05. "My Darlin" (featuring Future) (co-produced by P-Nazty); 07. "Love Money Party" (featuring Big Sean) (co-produced by Marz); 09. "Drive" (co-produced by P-Nazty); 12. "Maybe You're Right" (co-produced by P-Nazty); 13. "Someone Else" (co-produced by P-Nazty); 16. "Hands in the Air" (featuring Ludacris) (co-produced by P-Nazty)
Future, Miley Cyrus	2013	Non-album single	00. "Real and True" (featuring Mr. Hudson)
Future	2014	Honest	03. "Move That Dope" (featuring Pusha T, Pharrell & Casino) (co-produced by P-Nazty); 04. "My Momma" (featuring Wiz Khalifa) (co-produced by JBo); 07. "Never Satisfied" (featuring Drake) (co-produced by JBo); 17. "Shit" (co-produced by JBo)
Rick Ross	2014	Mastermind	08. "War Ready" (featuring Jeezy) (co-produced by A+)
Schoolboy Q	2014	Oxymoron	04. "What They Want" (featuring 2 Chainz) (co-produced by Marz)
Mariah Carey	2014	Me. I Am Mariah... The Elusive Chanteuse	02. "Faded" (produced with Mariah Carey)
2 Chainz	2014	Freebase EP	05. "WudaCudaShuda" (featuring Lil Boosie)
Trey Songz	2014	Trigga	09. "Late Night" (featuring Juicy J) (co-produced by A+)
Gucci Mane	2014	Trap House 4	03. "Top in the Trash" (featuring Chief Keef); 15. "Bum Bum"
Gucci Mane	2014	Gucci VS. Guwop	03. "Horror Flick"; 06. "Used to It" (featuring Wale); 09. "White Diamonds" (featuring Wooh Da Kid)
Gucci Mane & Migos	2014	World War 3D: The Green Album	8. Take My Soul
Rich Gang	2014	Rich Gang: Tha Tour Pt. 1	10. "I Got" (Young Thug featuring Peewee Longway)
Tinashe	2014	Aquarius	14. "Thug Cry" (co-produced by A+)
A$AP Ferg	2014	Ferg Forever	06. "Thug Cry (Tinashe Remix)"
Keyshia Cole	2014	Point of No Return	6. "New Nu"; 9. "Love Letter" (featuring Future)
Nicki Minaj	2014	The Pinkprint	02. "I Lied" (co-produced by Skooly)
Rae Sremmurd	2015	SremmLife	02. "Unlock the Swag" (featuring Jace of Two-9) (co-produced by A+); 03. "No Flex Zone" (co-produced by A+); 05. "This Could Be Us" (co-produced by Marz); 06. "Come Get Her" (co-produced by A+); 08. "Throw Sum Mo" (featuring Nicki Minaj & Young Thug) (produced with Soundz); 09. "Y.N.O." (featuring Big Sean) (co-produced by A+); 10. "No Type" (co-produced by Swae Lee)
Juicy J	2015	Blue Dream & Lean 2 (mixtape)	04. "I'm Sicka"; 05. "Already" (featuring Rae Sremmurd); 06. "Don't Trust"; 16. "Whole Thang" (featuring Wiz Khalifa)
Big Sean	2015	Dark Sky Paradise	06. "Paradise (Extended)"
Ludacris	2015	Ludaversal	09. "Come and See Me" (featuring Big K.R.I.T.)
Miley Cyrus	2015	Miley Cyrus & Her Dead Petz	08. "Fweaky" (co-produced by A+); 09. "Bang Me Box" (co-produced by Resource); 11. "Slab of Butter (Scorpion)" (featuring Sarah Barthel of Phantogram) (produced with Miley Cyrus and The Flaming Lips and co-produced by Ryder Ripps, Jon Baken and Josh Knapp); 13. "I Forgive Yiew" (co-produced by Ryder Ripps, Jon Baken and Josh Knapp); 15. "Lighter" (co-produced by A+)
The Game	2015	The Documentary 2	13. "Summertime" (featuring Jelly Roll)
Puff Daddy	2015	MMM (Money Making Mitch)	06. "MMM" (featuring Future & King Los) (co-produced with DJ Fu & Marz)
Young Thug	2016	I'm Up	1. "F Cancer (Boosie); 10. "Special"
2 Chainz	2016	ColleGrove	5. "MFN Right"
Rae Sremmurd	2016	SremmLife 2	2. "Real Chill" (featuring Kodak Black); 3. "By Chance"; 4. "Look Alive"; 5. "Black Beatles" (featuring Gucci Mane); 6. "Shake It Fast" (featuring Juicy J); 7. "Set the Roof" (featuring Lil Jon); 9. "Now That I Know"; 10."Take It or Leave It"; 11."Do Yoga"; 12."Over Here" (featuring Bobo Swae); 14."Just Like Us"
Beyoncé	2016	Lemonade	12. "Formation"
Young Thug	2016	Slime Season 3	1. "With Them"
Young Dolph	2016	King of Memphis	1. "Facts"; 7. "Let Me See"
Isaiah Rashad	2016	The Sun's Tirade	11. "A Lot" (co-produced with Pluss)
Gucci Mane	2016	Everybody Looking	1. "No Sleep (Intro)"; 4. "Waybach"; 5. "Pussy Print" (featuring Kanye West); 6. "Pop Music"; 7. "Guwop Home" (featuring Young Thug); 8. "Gucci Please"; 10."Richest Nigga in the Room"; 11."1st Day Out tha Feds"; 12."At Least a M"
Gucci Mane	2016	The Return of East Atlanta Santa	09. "Nonchalant"
2 Chainz	2016	Hibachi for Lunch	7. "Here We Go Again"
Kid Cudi	2016	Passion, Pain & Demon Slayin'	5. "All In"
Ab-Soul	2016	Do What Thou Wilt.	5. "Womanogamy"
Blac Youngsta	2017	Illuminati	2. "Hip Hopper" (featuring Lil Yachty)
Kodak Black	2017	Painting Pictures	11. "Corrlinks and JPay"
Kendrick Lamar	2017	Damn	2. "DNA"; 8. "Humble"; 11. "XXX" (featuring U2) (produced with DJ Dahi, Sounwave & Anthony Tiffith)
Casino	2017	Boss Man 3	8. "Pocket Full of Stones"
Katy Perry	2017	Witness	10. "Tsunami"
2 Chainz	2017	Pretty Girls Like Trap Music	1. "Saturday Night"
French Montana	2017	Jungle Rules	2. "Unforgettable" (featuring Swae Lee)
Ty Dolla Sign	2017	Beach House 3	7. "Don't Judge Me"; 8. "Dawsin's Break"
Young Dolph	2017	Thinking Out Loud	4. "Drippy"
Future & Young Thug	2017	Super Slimey	12. "Mink Flow"
Gucci Mane	2017	Mr. Davis	4. "Stunting Ain't Nuthin" (featuring Slim Jxmmi and Young Dolph) (produced with Harris)
Trouble	2018	Edgewood	Whole Album {except 2, 15, 16}
The Weeknd	2018	My Dear Melancholy,	02. "Try Me" (produced with Frank Dukes, DaHeala and Marz)
Rae Sremmurd	2018	SR3MM	1. "Up in My Cocina"; 2. "Close" (featuring Travis Scott); 3. "Bedtime Stories" (featuring The Weeknd); 4. "Perplexing Pegasus"; 5. "Buckets" (featuring Future); 7. "Powerglide" (featuring Juicy J)
Swae Lee	2018	Swaecation	4. "Offshore" ( featuring Young Thug)
Slim Jxmmi	2018	Jxmtro	1. "Brxnks Truck"; 3. "Anti-Social Smokers Club" (featuring Zoë Kravitz); 4. "Chanel" (featuring Pharrell); 5. "Cap" (featuring Trouble); 6. "Changed Up"; 9. "Growed Up"
Various Artists	2018	Black Panther (soundtrack)	08. "King's Dead" - Kendrick Lamar, Future & Jay Rock
YG	2018	Stay Dangerous	10. "666" {produced with Zitti}
Eminem	2018	Kamikaze	02. "Greatest"; 10. "Fall"
Nicki Minaj	2018	Queen	12. "Good Form"
Miley Cyrus	2019	She Is Coming	6. "Party up the Street" (featuring Mike Will & Swae Lee); 9. "Slide Away"
YoungBoy Never Broke Again	2019	AI YoungBoy 2	4. "Seeming Like It" (produced with J-Bo)
Blac Youngsta	2019	Church on Sunday	2. "So What"
Lil Wayne	2020	Funeral	15. "Sights & Silencers" {produced with Blue Cheeze}
Gorillaz	2020	Song Machine, Season One: Strange Timez	9. "Dead Butterflies" (featuring Kano and Roxani Arias) (produced with Gorillaz and Remi Kabaka Jr)
Chloe x Halle	2020	Ungodly Hour	8. "Catch Up" (featuring Mike Will Made-It & Swae Lee)
Big Sean	2020	Detroit 2	7. "Harder Than My Demons" (produced with DJ Khalil)
Gunna	2020	Wunna	5. "Dollaz on My Head" (produced with M. Harris)
YoungBoy Never Broke Again	2021	Sincerely, Kentrell	15. "Baddest Thing" (produced with Myles Harris and Menace)
Gucci Mane	2021	Ice Daddy	2."Posse on Bouldercrest" (featuring Pooh Shiesty and Sir Mix-a-Lot); 4."Like 34 & 8" (featuring Pooh Shiesty); 7."I Got It" (featuring Lil Uzi Vert); 11."Fold Dat Money" (featuring Project Pat); 12."Gucci Coming 4 U"; 15."Bust Down"; 17."How I See It"
Alicia Keys	2021	Keys	UNLOCKED side {except "Dead End Roads" & "Billions"
Chief Keef	2021	4Nem	6."Ice Cream Man"(produced with Resource and WhatLilShoddySay)
Gunna	2022	DS4Ever	5."Thought I Was Playing" (with 21 Savage)
Miley Cyrus	2023	Endless Summer Vacation	5. "Thousand Miles (Feat. Brandi Carlile)"; 8. "Violet Chemistry"; 9. "Muddy Feet (Feat. Sia)"
Rae Sremmurd	2023	Sremm 4 Life	1. "Origami (Hotties)"; 5. "Tanisha (Pump That)"; 9. "Sexy"
Sexyy Red	2023	Hood Hottest Princess	14. "Ghetto Princess" (with Chief Keef))"; 18. "Perfect Match" (with 42 Dugg and G Herbo)"
Gucci Mane	2023	Breath of Fresh Air	5. "Pretty Girls" (featuring Young Dolph); 8. "Talking to the Streets" (featuring Mac Critter); 9. "There I Go" (featuring J. Cole and Mike Will Made It)
Kodak Black	2023	Pistolz & Pearlz	1. "Pistolz & Pearlz"
Chief Keef	2024	Almighty So 2	5. "Jesus" (featuring Lil Gnar) (produced with Chief Keef and Shawn Ferrari)
Chief Keef	2024	Dirty Nachos	produced all tracks
Jennie	2025	Ruby	10. "Damn Right" (featuring Childish Gambino and Kali Uchis); 13. "Seoul City"; 14. "Starlight"; 15. "Twin"
BTS	2026	Arirang	3. "Aliens"; 5. "2.0"
