= Pluss =

American producer, songwriter

- Also known as: Pluss; A Pluss; A+; A13
- Born: Asheton Terrance O'Neil Hogan; Canton, Ohio, U.S.
- Genres: Hip hop; R&B; pop; trap
- Occupations: Record producer; songwriter
- Years active: 2012–present
- Label: EarDrummers

Asheton Terrance O'Neil Hogan, also known as PLUSS and A+, is an American songwriter and record producer, best known for his work with Lil Wayne ("Love Me"), Beyoncé ("Formation"), and Kendrick Lamar ("Humble"). He has won a Grammy Award from five nominations.

Growing up in Atlanta, Georgia, Hogan showed an early interest in music production, and formally entered the music industry at the behest of childhood friend Mike Will Made It, who had himself began production work for local artists. While subsequent contributions to Future and Chief Keef projects were released first, his first major credit was Lil Wayne's 2013 single "Love Me". Hogan has continued to work with other acts, including Nicki Minaj, Chloe x Halle, Rae Sremmurd, Lecrae, and Ty Dolla Sign among others, and has served an in-house producer with Mike Will Made It's EarDrummers Records.

== Songwriting and production credits ==
Credits are courtesy of Discogs, Tidal, Apple Music, and AllMusic.

Title	Year	Artist	Album
"Truth Gonna Hurt You"	2012	Future	Pluto
"No Tomorrow"	2012	Chief Keef	Finally Rich
"Love Me" (Featuring Drake and Future)	2013	Lil Wayne	I Am Not a Human Being II
"Wake Up, No Makeup"	2013	Ciara	One Woman Army (Shelved)
"Thug Cry"	2014	Tinashe	Aquarius
"War Ready" (Featuring Jeezy)	2014	Rick Ross	Mastermind
"Late Night" (Featuring Juicy J)	2014	Trey Songz	Trigga
"Stop-Start" (Featuring Gucci Mane, Chief Keef & PeeWee Longway)	2014	Mike Will Made It	Ransom Mixtape
"Money Long" (Featuring Key! & LightSkinMac11)	2014	Mike Will Made It	Ransom Mixtape
"Screen Door" (Featuring Bankroll Fresh)	2014	Mike Will Made It	Ransom Mixtape
"Change" (Featuring Eearz)	2014	Mike Will Made It	Ransom Mixtape
"Unlock the Swag" (Featuring Jace)	2015	Rae Sremmurd	SremmLife
"No Flex Zone"	2015	Rae Sremmurd	SremmLife
"Come Get Her"	2015	Rae Sremmurd	SremmLife
"YNO" (Featuring Big Sean)	2015	Rae Sremmurd	SremmLife
"Fweaky"	2015	Miley Cyrus	Miley Cyrus & Her Dead Petz
"Lighter"	2015	Miley Cyrus	Miley Cyrus & Her Dead Petz
"Formation"	2016	Beyoncé	Lemonade
"Start a Party"	2016	Rae Sremmurd	SremmLife 2
"Just Like Us"	2016	Rae Sremmurd	SremmLife 2
"1st Day Out tha Feds"	2016	Gucci Mane	Everybody Looking
"All In"	2016	Kid Cudi	Passion, Pain & Demon Slayin'
"A lot"	2016	Isaiah Rashad	The Sun's Tirade
"Humble"	2017	Kendrick Lamar	Damn
"Legacy"	2017	Yo Gotti & Mike Will Made It	Gotti Made-It
"Trap Go Hard"	2017	Yo Gotti & Mike Will Made It	Gotti Made-It
"Come Down" (Featuring Chief Keef and Rae Sremmurd)	2017	Mike Will Made It	Ransom 2
"Nothing Is Promised" (With Rihanna)	2017	Mike Will Made It	Ransom 2
"Mink Flow"	2017	Future & Young Thug	Super Slimey
"Blessings"	2017	Lecrae	All Things Work Together
"Dawsin's Breek" (Featuring Jeremih)	2017	Ty Dolla Sign	Beach House 3
"Hi Lo" (Featuring GoldLink)	2018	Chloe x Halle	The Kids Are Alright
"Everywhere"	2018	Chloe x Halle	The Kids Are Alright
"Good Form"	2018	Nicki Minaj	Queen
"Fate" (With Young Thug & Swae Lee)	2018	Mike Will Made It	Creed II: The Album
"Runnin" (With ASAP Rocky, ASAP Ferg & Nicki Minaj)	2018	Mike Will Made It	Creed II: The Album
"Ice Cold (Final Round)" (With Vince Staples and Ludwig Göransson)	2018	Mike Will Made It	Creed II: The Album
"Real Is Rare (Edgewood) / The Woods"	2018	Trouble	Edgewood
"Might Not"	2018	Trouble	Edgewood
"Rider" (Featuring Quavo & Fetty Wap)	2018	Trouble	Edgewood
"Krew / Time Afta Time"	2018	Trouble	Edgewood
"Up in My Cocina"	2018	Rae Sremmurd	SR3MM
"Anti-Social Smokers Club" (Slim Jxmmi Featuring Zoë Kravitz)	2018	Rae Sremmurd	SR3MM
"Greatest"	2018	Eminem	Kamikaze
"Just Like Me" (Featuring Young Thug)	2018	A Boogie wit da Hoodie	Hoodie SZN
"Under the Sun" (With J. Cole & Lute Featuring DaBaby)	2019	Dreamville	Revenge of the Dreamers III
"Down Bad" (Featuring JID, Bas, J. Cole, EarthGang & Young Nudy)	2019	Dreamville	Revenge of the Dreamers III
"Party Up the Street" (With Swae Lee & Mike Will Made It)	2019	Miley Cyrus	She Is Coming
"Hurting on Purpose" (Featuring K.Flay)	2020	Whethan	Fantasy
"Gold"	2020	JoJo	Good to Know
"Small Things"	2020	JoJo	Good to Know
"Catch Up" (With Swae Lee Featuring Mike Will Made-It)	2020	Chloe x Halle	Ungodly Hour
"That's Hard"	2020	Nasty C	Zulu Man with Some Power
"Only You" (Unlocked)	2021	Alicia Keys	Keys
"Skydive" (Unlocked)	2021	Alicia Keys	Keys
"Is It Insane" (Unlocked)	2021	Alicia Keys	Keys
"Raydar"	2022	JID	The Forever Story
"Mani"	2022	Baby Tate	Mani/Pedi
"Ma Boy" (Featuring JID & Lute)	2023	Dreamville	Creed III (Soundtrack)
"Culture" (With Mez, Reason, Symba and 8AE)	2023	Dreamville	Creed III (Soundtrack)
"Jack" (With EarthGang Featuring Buddy)	2023	Dreamville	Creed III (Soundtrack)
"In The Room" (With JID, Tierra Whack & BJ the Chicago Kid)	2023	Dreamville	Creed III (Soundtrack)
"Bend Ya Knees"	2023	Rae Sremmurd	Sremm 4 Life
"3001"	2024	J. Cole	Might Delete Later
"Zen"	2025	Jennie	Ruby
"F.T.S."	2025	Jennie	Ruby
"Starlight"	2025	Jennie	Ruby
"Tell No Lie" (Featuring Jackie Hill Perry)	2025	Lecrae	Reconstruction
"Aliens"	2026	BTS	Arirang
"2.0"	2026	BTS	Arirang

== Awards and nominations ==
Year	Ceremony	Award	Result	Ref
2016	2016 Soul Train Music Awards	Soul Train Music Award for The Ashford & Simpson Songwriter's Award (Formation)	Nominated	
2017	59th Annual Grammy Awards	Grammy Award for Album of the Year (Lemonade)	Nominated	
2017	59th Annual Grammy Awards	Grammy Award for Record of the Year (Formation)	Nominated	
2017	59th Annual Grammy Awards	Grammy Award for Song of the Year (Formation)	Nominated	
2018	60th Annual Grammy Awards	Grammy Award for Best Rap Song (Humble)	Won	
2018	60th Annual Grammy Awards	Grammy Award for Record of the Year (Humble)	Nominated	
2018	49th GMA Dove Awards	Song of the Year (Blessings)	Nominated	
