= Creed II: The Album =

Soundtrack album to the 2018 film

Soundtrack album by Mike Will Made It
- Released: November 16, 2018
- Genres: Hip hop; R&B; film score
- Length: 53:52
- Labels: Ear Drummer; Interscope
- Producers: Mike Will Made It (exec.); Anthony Burrell; B Rackz; Blue Cheeze; C Millz; Lil Jay on the Track; Ludwig Göransson; Myles Harris; Nez & Rio; Pluss; Qwyatt Mystique; Vince Staples

Mike Will Made It chronology
Edgewood (2018)	Creed II: The Album (2018)	Dirty Nachos (2024)

Singles from Creed II: The Album
- 1. "Kill 'Em with Success" Released: November 5, 2018; 2. "The Mantra" Released: November 14, 2018; 3. "Shea Butter Baby" Released: February 23, 2019; 4. "Runnin" Released: March 18, 2019

The 2018 American sports drama film Creed II, a sequel to Creed (2015) and the eighth installment in the Rocky franchise, was accompanied by two soundtrack albums. Creed II: The Album, featuring original songs produced by Mike Will Made-It, and Creed II: Original Motion Picture Soundtrack, featuring an original score composed by Ludwig Göransson, were both released on November 16, 2018.

== Background ==
In March 2018, it was announced that Swedish composer Ludwig Göransson would score Creed II; the movie marks the first feature-length film collaboration between Göransson and director Steven Caple Jr. In October it was reported that Mike Will Made-It will serve as the executive producer for the soundtrack to the film.

The soundtrack features songs that are heard in the film as well as others that are inspired by it. It also contains guest appearances by Lil Wayne, Bon Iver, Crime Mob, Slim Jxmmi, Eearz, Schoolboy Q, 2 Chainz, Nas, Rick Ross, Young Thug, Swae Lee, Ari Lennox, J. Cole, Pharrell Williams, Kendrick Lamar, Kodak Black, Gucci Mane, YG, Trouble, Quavo, Juicy J, ASAP Rocky, ASAP Ferg, Nicki Minaj, Tessa Thompson, Gunna, Ama Lou, Vince Staples, and Ella Mai.

== Release ==
Mike Will Made It released the first single from the album, "Kill 'Em with Success", on November 5, 2018, in which he collaborated with fellow artists ScHoolboy, 2 Chainz and Eearz, shortly after a new trailer for the film was released. A second single, "The Mantra", is a collaboration with Pharrell and Kendrick Lamar and was released on November 14, 2018. On November 6, 2018, via Instagram, Mike Will announced the album listening party hosted by him. In a statement about the soundtrack, Mike Will said:

There was a time where movie soundtracks had people just as excited as an artist’s album, and that’s the feeling I was going for when creating this project alongside Ludwig Göransson and Fam Rothstein. After people hear the music, I want them to say movie soundtracks are back......

== Track listing ==
No.	Title	Writer(s)	Producer(s)	Length
1.	"Amen (Pre Fight Prayer)" (with Lil Wayne)	Michael Williams II; Dwayne Carter; Andrew Blakemore	Mike Will Made It; Andrew Wyatt	2:03
2.	"Do You Need Power? (Walk Out Music)" (Bon Iver)	Justin Vernon; Phil Cook; BJ Burton; Williams II	Mike Will Made It; Qwyatt Mystique	1:57
3.	"We Can Hit (Round 1)" (with Crime Mob and Slim Jxmmi)	Williams II; Jonathan Lewis; Jarques Usher; Venetia Lewis; Alphonce Smith; Aaquil Brown	Mike Will Made It; Lil Jay on the Track	4:12
4.	"Kill 'Em with Success" (with Eearz, Schoolboy Q and 2 Chainz)	Branden Brown; Christopher Lee; Mark Buchanan; Williams II; Quincy Hanley; Tauheed Epps	Mike Will Made It; B Rackz; C Millz	4:23
5.	"Check" (with Nas and Rick Ross)	Williams II; Aaron Jackson; Nasir Jones; William Roberts II	Mike Will Made It; Blue Cheeze	3:38
6.	"Fate" (with Young Thug and Swae Lee)	Williams II; Asheton Hogan; Swae Lee; Khalif Brown; Jeffery Williams	Mike Will Made It; Pluss	4:24
7.	"Shea Butter Baby" (performed by Ari Lennox and J. Cole)	Courtney Salter; Jermaine Cole; Anthony Parrino; Tim Schoegje	Elite; Shroom^{[a]}	3:31
8.	"The Mantra" (with Pharrell Williams and Kendrick Lamar)	Williams II; Myles Harris; Pharrell Williams; Kendrick Duckworth	Mike Will Made It; Harris	4:15
9.	"Watching Me" (with Rae Sremmurd and Kodak Black)	Williams II; Ludwig Göransson; Brown; Brown; Dieuson Octave	Mike Will Made It; Göransson	4:19
10.	"F.I.G.H.T." (with Eearz, Gucci Mane, YG, Trouble, Quavo and Juicy J)	Williams II; J. Lewis; Lee; Radric Davis; Keenon Jackson; Mariel Orr; Quavious Marshall; Jordan Houston	Mike Will Made It; Lil Jay on the Track	6:32
11.	"Runnin" (with ASAP Rocky, ASAP Ferg and Nicki Minaj)	Williams II; Hogan; Göransson; Rakim Mayers; Onika Maraj; Darold Ferguson	Mike Will Made It; Pluss; Göransson	2:13
12.	"Midnight" (with Tessa Thompson and Gunna)	Williams II; Göransson; Tessa Thompson; Sergio Kitchens	Mike Will Made It; Göransson	3:38
13.	"Bless Me (Demo)" (Ama Lou)	Ama John; Mario Loving; Nesbitt Wesonga	Nez & Rio	3:12
14.	"Ice Cold (Final Round)" (with Vince Staples and Ludwig Göransson)	Vince Staples; Göransson; Williams II; Hogan	Mike Will Made It; Göransson; Pluss; Staples	2:06
15.	"Love Me Like That (Champion Love)" (Ella Mai)	Diane Warren	Anthony Burrell	3:31
Total length:				53:52

Notes

- ^{^[a]} signifies an additional producer

== Charts ==
Chart (2018)	Peak position
Canadian Albums (Billboard)	63
Dutch Albums (Album Top 100)	115
French Albums (SNEP)	171
US Billboard 200	49
US Top R&B/Hip-Hop Albums (Billboard)	23
US Soundtrack Albums (Billboard)	4

== Score album ==
Creed II: Original Motion Picture Soundtrack

Soundtrack album by Ludwig Göransson
- Released: November 16, 2018
- Genres: Film score, hip hop
- Length: 50:49
- Label: Sony Classical
- Producer: Ludwig Göransson

Ludwig Göransson chronology
Venom (Original Motion Picture Soundtrack) (2018)	Creed II: Original Motion Picture Soundtrack (2018)	The Mandalorian: Chapter 1 (Original Score) (2019)

Creed II: Original Motion Picture Soundtrack is the soundtrack album for the 2018 film Creed II, composed by Ludwig Göransson. It was released on November 16, 2018, through Sony Classical Records.

No.	Title	Length
1.	"Drago"	3:34
2.	"Wheeler Fight"	2:32
3.	"Yo? Is That a Yes?"	1:27
4.	"The Public Challenge"	4:04
5.	"Time Tick" (performed by Tessa Thompson)	2:58
6.	"You Think I'm Going to Lose"	2:58
7.	"Balanced Breakfast"	1:31
8.	"Ice Cold" (with Vince Staples)	2:10
9.	"Under Water"	2:01
10.	"Adonis and Amara"	2:27
11.	"You Might Find Me" (with Jacob Banks)	1:19
12.	"Runnin" (featuring ASAP Rocky and Jacob Banks)	5:04
13.	"Drago's Walk Out"	1:59
14.	"I Will Go to War" (performed by Tessa Thompson)	1:37
15.	"Fight in Moscow"	6:14
16.	"It's Your Time"	5:28
17.	"Family Visit"	3:26
