= Slim Jxmmi =

American rapper and singer (born 1991)

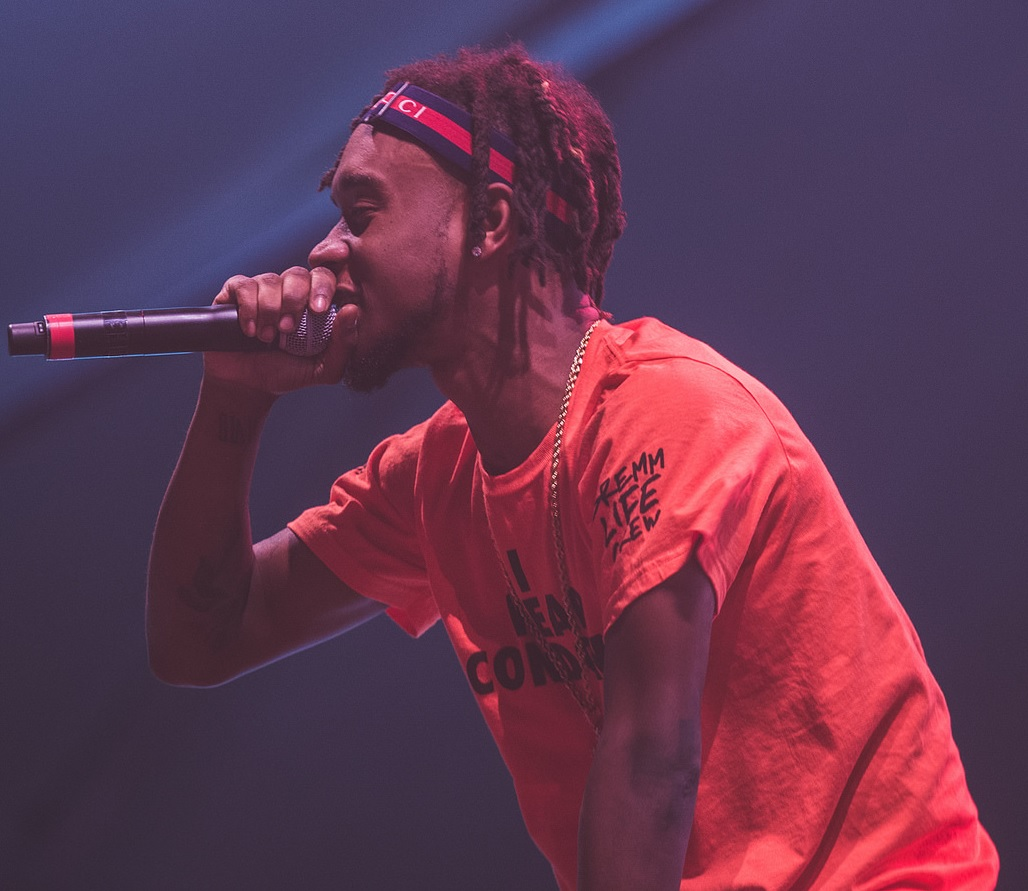
- Slim Jxmmi performing in 2016

Background information
- Also known as: CaliBoy; Slim Jimmy
- Born: Aaquil Iben Shaman Brown; December 29, 1991 (age 34); Inglewood, California, U.S.
- Origin: Tupelo, Mississippi, U.S.
- Genres: Southern hip-hop; trap
- Occupations: Rapper; singer
- Years active: 2010–present
- Labels: EarDrummers; Interscope; SremmLife Crew
- Member of: Rae Sremmurd
- Children: 1
- Website: slimjxmepk.com

Aaquil Iben Shaman Brown (born December 29, 1991), known professionally as Slim Jxmmi (pronounced Slim Jimmy), is an American rapper and singer. He is one half of the Mississippi-based hip-hop duo Rae Sremmurd, which he formed in 2010 with his brother Swae Lee. They signed with Mike Will Made It's EarDrummers Records, an imprint of Interscope Records, in 2013. The duo's first three albums — SremmLife (2015), SremmLife 2 (2016) and SR3MM (2018) — debuted within the top ten of the Billboard 200, while spawning hit songs including No Flex Zone, No Type, and Black Beatles (featuring Gucci Mane) —the latter of which topped the Billboard Hot 100.

His guest appearance alongside Young Dolph on Gucci Mane's 2017 single Stuntin' Ain't Nuthin', marked his first solo entry on the Billboard Hot 100.

== Early life ==
Aaquil Iben Shaman Brown was born on December 29, 1991, in Inglewood, California, to a single mother who worked on tanks in the United States Army. Raised in the Ida Street housing projects, in Tupelo, Mississippi, Slim began making music in high school with his younger brother, Swae Lee, and local rapper Lil Pantz as part of the group Dem Outta St8 Boyz. After graduating, Slim and his brother experienced a period of homelessness, squatting in an abandoned house. As an emerging rapper, Slim drew inspiration from Eminem and initially emulated his style.

== Career ==
Slim and his younger brother Swae Lee began their music career in 2010, meeting Jemiah "J-Bo" Middlebrooks in Tupelo while he was playing basketball at a local park. The brothers first formed Dem Outta St8 Boyz with Jemiah "J-Bo" Middlebrooks. Slim then took on the moniker "CaliBoy". In 2010, the brothers used their part-time job earnings to purchase music equipment and produce music at home. Their single Party Animal, released later that year, achieved local fame. After their local success with Party Animal, Slim and Swae Lee auditioned for BET's 106 & Park segment Wild 'n Out in Memphis, Tennessee, and successfully qualified. Slim and Swae Lee participated on the show on December 8 in New York City and performed Party Animal.

In 2013, Mike Will Made It finalized the creation of his major label, EarDrummers Entertainment, in partnership with Interscope Records, with Slim and Lee becoming the label's first signed artists. In December 2013, they made a guest appearance on Mike Will Made It's mixtape #MikeWiLLBeenTriLL on the track We. On May 18, 2014, they released their debut single, No Flex Zone, which debuted at number 36 on the Billboard Hot 100. In December 2014, Slim and Lee released Throw Sum Mo, featuring rapper Nicki Minaj and Young Thug, which debuted at number 30 on the Billboard Hot 100. As a solo artist, Jxmmi made his debut on Mike Will Made It's Choppin Blades on December 15, 2024. On January 6, 2015, they released their debut studio album, SremmLife, which debuted at number 5 on the Billboard 200.

On June 16, 2016, they announced that their next album, SremmLife 2, would be released on August 12, 2016. The album included their first Billboard Hot 100 number-one song, Black Beatles, which topped the chart in the issue dated November 26, 2016, also giving Gucci Mane his first number-one hit. On May 23, 2017, Slim Jxmmi was featured on Riff Raff's song Tip Toe 2. On August 4, 2017, the duo released a new single titled Perplexing Pegasus. On October 13, 2017, Slim Jxmmi was featured alongside Young Dolph on Gucci Mane's single Stuntin' Ain't Nuthin', which debuted at number 95 on the Billboard Hot 100.

In March 2018, Slim released his debut solo single Brxnks Truck. On April 5, 2018, he released the single Chanel, featuring Swae Lee and Pharrell Williams. On May 4, 2018, Slim released his debut solo studio album, Jxmtro, which debuted at number six on the Billboard 200. Sheldon Pearce of Pitchfork noted that "while Swae's blend of pop, R&B, and dancehall is more daring, Jxmmi's Jxmtro is more consistent and reveals more of himself as an artist and person." Calum Slingerland of Exclaim! considered Jxmtro "a less adventurous outing, but Jxmmi shows marked improvement in his technique." In May 2018, he appeared on rapper Childish Gambino's Grammy-winning single "This Is America".

In December 2018, Slim released the single Nothin' For Christmas, featuring hip-hop duo Rae Sremmurd and label Ear Drummers. Although it didn't chart, it received a positive response. In August 2019, he guest appeared on Snoop Dogg's Do It When I'm in It, alongside Puerto Rican singer Ozuna and rapper-producer Jermaine Dupri. On October 3, 2019, he was featured on Afro B's Fine Wine & Hennessy. The song's accompanying music video was released on October 22. In November 2020, he collaborated on B OK with Baby Goth. On December 2, 2022, he was featured on Desiigner's Kilo. On March 29, 2024, he appeared alongside Sukihana on Reazy Renegade's Peep Show. On November 8, 2024, Slim appeared as a guest on Will Power 912 song Love That For You.

== Controversy ==
On January 25, 2022, Slim was arrested in Miami, Florida, after allegedly attacking the mother of his young child during an argument. According to a Miami police arrest report, the altercation began when his girlfriend confronted him about a woman he followed on social media. The police report alleges that Brown returned home, chased his girlfriend around their residence, and broke down a door when she attempted to escape. He also allegedly threw her phone over a balcony. On February 22, 2022, the battery charge against Slim was dropped.

== Discography ==
=== Studio albums ===
List of albums, with release date and label shown
Title	Album details	Peak chart positions			
Title	Album details	US	US R&B/HH	US Rap	CAN
Jxmtro (as part of SR3MM by Rae Sremmurd)	Released: May 4, 2018; Label: EarDrummers, Interscope, SremmLife Crew; Formats: CD, digital download, streaming	6	5	4	4

=== Singles ===
==== As lead artist ====
Title	Year	Peak chart positions					Certifications	Album
Title	Year	US	US R&B/HH	CAN	SWI	UK	Certifications	Album
"Brxnks Truck"	2018	—	—	—	—	—		Jxmtro
"Chanel" (with Swae Lee featuring Pharrell Williams)	2018	—	—	—	—	—		Jxmtro
"Guatemala" (with Swae Lee)	2018	84	39	39	71	92	RIAA: Platinum; BPI: Gold; MC: Platinum; RMNZ: Gold	Swaecation
"Nothing for Christmas"	2018	—	—	—	—	—		Non-album singles
"Kilo" (with Desiigner)	2022	—	—	—	—	—		Non-album singles
"Peep Show" (with Reazy Renegade and Sukihana featuring Real Boston Richey and BRS Kash)	2024	—	—	—	—	—		Non-album singles

==== As featured artist ====
Title	Year	Peak chart positions	Album
Title	Year	US Rhy.	Album
"Do It When I'm in It" (Snoop Dogg featuring Jermaine Dupri, Ozuna and Slim Jxmmi)	2019	26	I Wanna Thank Me
"Fine Wine & Hennessey" (Afro B featuring Slim Jxmmi)	2019	37	Afrowave 3

=== Other charted songs ===
Title	Year	Peak chart positions		Album
Title	Year	US	US R&B/HH	Album
"Stunting Ain't Nuthin" (Gucci Mane featuring Slim Jxmmi and Young Dolph)	2017	95	39	Mr. Davis
