= Greatest (song) =

Eminem song

Song by Eminem

from the album Kamikaze
- Released: August 31, 2018
- Recorded: 2018
- Genre: Hip hop
- Length: 3:47
- Label: Shady; Aftermath; Interscope
- Songwriters: Marshall Mathers; Jordan Carter; Kendrick Duckworth; Asheton Hogan; Jordan Jenks; Jeremy Miller; Anthony Tiffith; Michael Williams II; Symere Woods
- Producers: Jeremy Miller; Mike Will Made It

"Greatest" is a song by American rapper Eminem from his album Kamikaze (2018). The second track of the album, it was produced by Jeremy "Backpack" Miller and Mike Will Made It. It contains interpolations of "Humble" by Kendrick Lamar and "Wokeuplikethis" by Playboi Carti featuring Lil Uzi Vert; as such, the producers and artists of both songs are credited as songwriters.

== Composition ==
The song, produced by Mike Will Made It and Jeremy "Backpack" Miller, contains interpolations of Kendrick Lamar's "Humble" (co-produced by Mike Will Made It) and Playboi Carti's "Wokeuplikethis". This is one of multiple songs where Mathers addresses the criticism of his previous project, Revival (2017).

== Personnel ==
- Eminem – lead vocals
- Jeremy "Backpack" Miller – production
- Mike Will Made It – production
- Tony Campagna – recording
- Joe Strange – recording
- Mike Strange – recording

== Charts ==
Chart (2018)	Peak position
Australia (ARIA)	15
Austria (Ö3 Austria Top 40)	26
Canada Hot 100 (Billboard)	16
Czech Republic Singles Digital (ČNS IFPI)	8
Finland (Suomen virallinen lista)	17
France (SNEP)	59
Germany (GfK)	40
Greece Digital International Singles (IFPI)	11
Hungary (Stream Top 40)	9
Ireland (IRMA)	11
Italy (FIMI)	33
Netherlands (Single Top 100)	37
New Zealand (Recorded Music NZ)	12
Norway (VG-lista)	14
Portugal (AFP)	14
Slovakia Singles Digital (ČNS IFPI)	4
Sweden (Sverigetopplistan)	28
US Billboard Hot 100	23
US Hot R&B/Hip-Hop Songs (Billboard)	16

== Certifications ==
Region	Certification	Certified units/sales
Australia (ARIA)	Platinum	70,000^{‡}
Brazil (Pro-Música Brasil)	Gold	20,000^{‡}
United Kingdom (BPI)	Silver	200,000^{‡}
United States (RIAA)	Gold	500,000^{‡}
^{‡} Sales+streaming figures based on certification alone.
