= Blasé (song) =

Single by Ty Dolla Sign featuring Future and Rae Sremmurd

from the album Free TC
- Released: June 26, 2015
- Recorded: 2015
- Genre: Hip hop; trap
- Length: 4:46
- Label: Atlantic
- Songwriters: Tyrone Griffin; Nayvadius Wilburn; Khalif Brown; Aaquil Brown; Gary Hill
- Producer: DJ Spinz

Ty Dolla Sign singles chronology
| "Only Right" (2015) | "Blasé" (2015) | "100" (2015) |

Future singles chronology
| "3500" (2015) | "Blasé" (2015) | "Where Ya At" (2015) |

Rae Sremmurd singles chronology
| "This Could Be Us" (2015) | "Blasé" (2015) | "Come Get Her" (2015) |

Music video
- "Blasé " on YouTube

"Blasé" is a song by American singer Ty Dolla Sign featuring American rapper Future and American hip hop duo Rae Sremmurd. Written alongside producer DJ Spinz, it was released as the lead single from the former's debut studio album Free TC on June 26, 2015.

== Music video ==
On August 17, 2015, the singer confirmed that the music video for "Blasé" had been shot and will premiere "soon". On September 13, 2015, the music video for "Blasé" was released. The music video features cameo appearances from Tinashe and Dej Loaf and was filmed in Los Angeles and Philadelphia. The video includes footage of Rae Sremmurd in Philadelphia's Chinatown as well as a live performance by Ty Dolla Sign. Ty's energetic live performance featured in the video, as well as the video's intentionally amateur film quality, is inspired by and reminiscent of 1980s hardcore punk shows and specifically the live performances of the band Bad Brains and the filmed performance of the Bad Brains at CBGB in 1982.

== Remixes ==
On September 20, 2015, Canadian rapper Drake premiered a remix by OVO Sound signee PartyNextDoor on his Beats 1 Radio show, OVOSound Radio. On December 11, 2015, the two official remixes of "Blasé" were released. The first remix version features Young Jeezy, Juicy J. and Diddy, while the second remix features T.I., French Montana and ASAP Ferg.

== Track listing ==
- Digital download
- "Blasé" (featuring Future and Rae Sremmurd) (Explicit) – 4:46
- "Blasé" (featuring Future and Rae Sremmurd) (Clean) – 4:46

== Charts ==
=== Weekly charts ===
| Chart (2015) | Peak position |
|---|---|
| US Billboard Hot 100 | 63 |
| US Hot R&B/Hip-Hop Songs (Billboard) | 20 |
| US R&B/Hip-Hop Airplay (Billboard) | 9 |
| US Rhythmic Airplay (Billboard) | 24 |

== Certifications ==
| Region | Certification | Certified units/sales |
|---|---|---|
| Canada (Music Canada) | Gold | 40,000^{‡} |
| New Zealand (RMNZ) | Gold | 15,000^{‡} |
| United States (RIAA) | 2× Platinum | 2,000,000^{‡} |
^{‡} Sales+streaming figures based on certification alone.

== Release history ==
| Country | Date | Format | Label |
|---|---|---|---|
| United States | June 26, 2015 | Digital download | Taylor Gang; Pu$haz Ink; Atlantic |
| United States | August 11, 2015 | Mainstream urban radio | Taylor Gang; Pu$haz Ink; Atlantic |
