= Edgewood (album) =

2018 album by Trouble

Studio album by Trouble
- Released: March 23, 2018
- Genre: Hip hop
- Length: 54:41
- Label: Duct Tape; Ear Drummer; Interscope
- Producer: Mike WiLL Made-It (also exec.); 30 Roc; Scooly; Derek Schklar; Pluss; ATL Jacob; Cassius Jay; Drummsection; Zaytoven; Marz

Trouble chronology
16 (2017)	Edgewood (2018)	Thug Luv (2020)

Mike Will Made It chronology
Gotti Made-It (2017)	Edgewood (2018)	Creed II: The Album (2018)

Professional ratings
Review scores
Source	Rating
Pitchfork	7.8/10

Edgewood is the debut studio album by American rapper Trouble from Atlanta, Georgia. It was released on March 23, 2018, via Duct Tape Entertainment, Ear Drummer Records, and Interscope Records. It was produced entirely by Mike Will Made It, who also served as executive producer on the project, with some assistance from 30 Roc and Zaytoven. The album features guest appearances from Boosie Badazz, Drake, Fetty Wap, Lil 1, Low Down Dirty Black, Quavo and The Weeknd. It became Trouble's first and only project to chart on the Billboard 200, reaching number 130.

== Track listing ==
No.	Title	Writer(s)	Producer(s)	Length
1.	"Real Is Rare (Edgewood) / The Woods"	Mariel Orr; Michael Williams II; Asheton Hogan; Derek Schklar	Mike WiLL Made-It; Pluss	4:18
2.	"It's in Your Hands" (featuring Low Down Dirty Black)	Orr; Rashad Holsey; Schklar	Derek Schklar	1:17
3.	"Might Not"	Orr; Williams II	Mike WiLL Made-It	4:39
4.	"Pull Dat Cash Out / December" (featuring Lil 1 DTE)	Orr; Hosley; Williams II; Samuel Gloade; Schklar	Mike WiLL Made-It; 30 Roc	3:32
5.	"Bring It Back" (featuring Drake)	Orr; Aubrey Graham; Williams II	Mike WiLL Made-It	4:15
6.	"Wuzzam, Wuzzup"	Orr; Joshua Luellen	Mike WiLL Made-It	3:45
7.	"My Boy"	Orr; Williams II; Anthony Brown; Marcus Bell	Mike WiLL Made-It; WhatLilShoddySay; Scooly	3:20
8.	"The Day Before"	Orr; Schklar	Mike WiLL Made-It	2:11
9.	"Kesha Dem"	Orr; Williams II; Brown	Mike WiLL Made-It; WhatLilShoddySay	3:01
10.	"Come Thru" (featuring the Weeknd)	Orr; Abel Tesfaye; Williams II; Gloade; Aubrey Pottor	Mike WiLL Made-It; 30 Roc; Aubz Made It^{[a]}	3:21
11.	"Rider" (featuring Quavo and Fetty Wap)	Orr; Quavious Marshall; Willie Maxwell II	Mike WiLL Made-It; Pluss	3:51
12.	"Knock It Down"	Orr; Williams II; Marquel Middlebrooks	Mike WiLL Made-It; Marz	3:00
13.	"Selfish"	Orr; Williams II	Mike WiLL Made-It	2:04
14.	"Krew / Time Afta Time"	Orr; Williams II; Middlebrooks; Hogan	Mike WiLL Made-It; Marz; Pluss	4:51
15.	"Ms. Cathy & Ms. Connie" (featuring Boosie Badazz)	Orr; Torrence Hatch Jr; Xavier Dotson	Zaytoven	3:12
16.	"Hurt Real Bad"	Orr; Marcus Brown	DrummSection	3:55
Total length:				54:41

Edgewood – 41E Edition (bonus tracks)
No.	Title	Writer(s)	Producer(s)	Length
17.	"Taking Chances" (featuring Lil 1 DTE, Tyree & Veli Sosa)	Orr; Williams II; Stephen Hybicki	Mike WiLL Made-It; The Sauce	3:22
18.	"Apologetic"	Orr; Brown; Williams II	WhatLilShoddySay; Mike WiLL Made-It	3:28
19.	"Kesha Dem" (featuring Offset)	Orr; Kiari Cephus; Williams II; Brown	Mike WiLL Made-It; WhatLilShoddySay	3:18
20.	"Raise No Fool"	Orr; Williams II	Mike WiLL Made-It	2:52
21.	"Edgewood" (featuring Alley Boy)	Orr	ATL Jacob; Mike WiLL Made-It; Cassius Jay	2:50
Total length:				57:24

Notes

- ^{^[a]} signifies an additional producer

== Charts ==
Chart (2018)	Peak position
US Billboard 200	130
