= Come Get Her =

Single by Rae Sremmurd

from the album SremmLife
- Released: September 29, 2015
- Recorded: 2015
- Genre: Hip hop · Dirty rap
- Length: 3:32
- Label: EarDrummers; Interscope
- Songwriters: Khalif Brown; Aaquil Brown; Michael Williams; Asheton "A+" Hogan
- Producer: Mike Will Made It

Rae Sremmurd singles chronology
"Blasé" (2015)	"Come Get Her" (2015)	"By Chance" (2016)

"Come Get Her" is a song by American hip hop duo Rae Sremmurd. It was released on September 29, 2015, by EarDrummers and Interscope Records, as the fifth single from their debut album SremmLife. The song was written alongside producer Mike Will Made It and co-producer A+. The music video for the song was released prior on September 21, 2015.

== Music video ==
The music video was released on September 21, 2015. The video revolves around Rae Sremmurd being accidentally booked to perform at a country-music line-dancing club. It was filmed at the Cowboy Palace saloon in LA.

== Personnel ==
Credits adapted from SremmLife booklet.

Song credits

- Writing – Aaquil Brown, Khalif Brown, Michael Williams II, Marquel Middlebrooks
- Production – Mike Will Made It
- Co-production – A+
- Recording – Stephen Hybicki at Windmark Recording in Santa Monica, California and Cody Seal at Larrabee Sound Studios in North Hollywood, California
- Audio mixing – Jaycen Joshua and Mike Will Made It at Larrabee Sound Studios in North Hollywood, California
- Assistant mix engineering – Maddox Chhim and Ryand Kaul
- Mastering – Dave Kutch, The Mastering Palace, New York City

== Charts ==
Chart (2015)	Peak position
US Billboard Hot 100	56
US Hot R&B/Hip-Hop Songs (Billboard)	19
US R&B/Hip-Hop Airplay (Billboard)	18
US Rhythmic Airplay (Billboard)	29

== Certifications ==
Region	Certification	Certified units/sales
Brazil (Pro-Música Brasil)	Gold	30,000^{‡}
Denmark (IFPI Danmark)	Gold	45,000^{‡}
New Zealand (RMNZ)	2× Platinum	60,000^{‡}
United Kingdom (BPI)	Gold	400,000^{‡}
United States (RIAA)	5× Platinum	5,000,000^{‡}
^{‡} Sales+streaming figures based on certification alone.
