= SremmLife =

Studio album by Rae Sremmurd
- Released: January 6, 2015
- Recorded: 2013–14
- Studios: Various: Ear Druma Studios; Tree Sound Studios; Mean Street Studios; (Atlanta, Georgia); No Excuses; Windmark Studios; (Santa Monica, California); Larrabee Sound Studios; (North Hollywood, California); Glenwood Place Studios; (Burbank, California)
- Genres: Hip hop; trap
- Length: 45:32
- Labels: Ear Drummer; Made; Interscope
- Producers: BackPack; Mike Will Made It; Pluss; Young Chop; Marz; Sonny Digital; Soundz; Swae Lee; Honorable C.N.O.T.E.

Rae Sremmurd chronology
SremmLife (2015)	SremmLife 2 (2016)

Singles from SremmLife
- 1. "No Flex Zone" Released: May 18, 2014; 2. "No Type" Released: September 15, 2014; 3. "Throw Sum Mo" Released: December 9, 2014; 4. "This Could Be Us" Released: April 21, 2015; 5. "Come Get Her" Released: September 29, 2015

SremmLife is the debut studio album by American hip hop duo Rae Sremmurd. It was released on January 6, 2015, by Ear Drummer Records and Interscope Records. The album was supported by five singles: "No Flex Zone", "No Type", "Throw Sum Mo" featuring Nicki Minaj and Young Thug, "This Could Be Us" and "Come Get Her".

== Background ==
Rae Sremmurd is a Mississippi-bred hip hop duo composed of Swae Lee and Slim Jxmmi. In 2014, the duo signed a recording contract with American music producer Mike Will Made It's newly found label, the Interscope Records imprint, Ear Drummer Records.

== Singles ==
The duo's debut single from the album, called "No Flex Zone" was released via digital download on May 18, 2014. The song was produced by Mike Will Made It, and co-produced by A+. The song gained media attention after the release of the remix, which features guest vocals from rappers Nicki Minaj and Pusha T. The song peaked at number 36 on the US Billboard Hot 100.

The album's second single, called "No Type" was released on September 15, 2014. Producer Mike WiLL Made-It also serves the production on this track, along with Swae Lee. The song peaked at number 16 on the US Billboard Hot 100. It was the number 70 song of the 2015 year-end chart.

The album's third single, called "Throw Sum Mo" was released on December 9, 2014. The song features guest vocals from these fellow American hip hop recording artists Nicki Minaj and Young Thug, with the production that was handled by Soundz and Mike WiLL Made-It. The song peaked at number 30 on the US Billboard Hot 100.

The album's fourth single, "This Could Be Us" was sent to US urban adult contemporary radio on April 21, 2015. The song's production was handled by Mike WiLL Made-It. The song peaked at number 49 on the US Billboard Hot 100.

The album's fifth single, "Come Get Her" was sent to US rhythmic radio on September 29, 2015. The song was produced by Mike WiLL Made-It, and co-produced by A+. The song peaked at number 56 on the US Billboard Hot 100.

== Critical reception ==
Professional ratings
Aggregate scores
Source	Rating
AnyDecentMusic?	7.2/10
Metacritic	78/100
Review scores
Source	Rating
AllMusic	4/5 stars
Complex	4/5 stars
Cuepoint (Expert Witness)	A−
Exclaim!	7/10
HipHopDX	3.5/5
Now	4/5
Paste	8.1/10
Pitchfork	7.8/10
Rolling Stone	4/5 stars
Spin	6/10

SremmLife received generally positive reviews from music critics. At Metacritic, which assigns a normalized rating out of 100 to reviews from critics, the album received an average score of 78, which indicates "generally favorable reviews", based on 15 reviews. Writing for Exclaim!, Eric Zaworski concluded that "SremmLife sounds like how cheap vodka works — it burns a little, yeah, but it gets you there," explaining that the record "only further reinforces the vice grip hip-hop from south of the Mason-Dixon has on the mainstream." Justin Charity of Complex said "the chants and ecstatic poetry of SremmLife are fully charged from start to finish."

=== Year-end lists ===
Publication	Accolade	Year	Rank
Complex	The 50 Best Albums of 2015	2015	3
Entertainment Weekly	The 40 Best Albums of 2015	2015	23
LA Times	10 Great Pop Albums in 2015	2015	n/a
Pitchfork	The 50 Best Albums of 2015	2015	29
Rolling Stone	The 50 Best Albums of 2015	2015	44
Stereogum	The 50 Best Albums of 2015	2015	36

=== All time lists ===
Publication	Accolade	Year	Rank
Rolling Stone	The 200 Greatest Hip-Hop Albums of All Time	2022	152

== Commercial performance ==
SremmLife debuted at number 5 on the US Billboard 200, with 49,000 equivalent album units; it sold 34,000 copies in its first week, with the remainder of its unit count reflecting streaming activity and track sales. In its second week, the album declined to number 17 with 23,000 units, including an additional 11,000 copies sold. It has remained on the album chart for 19 weeks thus far. As of June 2016, SremmLife has sold 198,000 copies domestically. With streaming and physical sales, the album has since gone Platinum and all of its singles have gone 2× Platinum or higher, with the promotional single "Up Like Trump" being certified Gold.

== Track listing ==
No.	Title	Writer(s)	Producer(s)	Length
1.	"Lit Like Bic"	Aaquil Brown; Khalif Brown; Stephen Hybicki; Jeremy Miller	BackPack	4:34
2.	"Unlock the Swag" (featuring Jace)	A. Brown; K. Brown; Jason Harris; Michael Williams; Asheton Hogan	Mike Will Made It; A+ ^{[a]}	5:22
3.	"No Flex Zone"	A. Brown; K. Brown; M. Williams; Hogan	Mike Will Made It; A+ ^{[a]}	3:51
4.	"My X"	A. Brown; K. Brown; Tyree Pittman	Young Chop	3:34
5.	"This Could Be Us"	A. Brown; K. Brown; M. Williams; Marquel Middlebrooks	Mike Will Made It; Marz ^{[a]}	3:26
6.	"Come Get Her"	A. Brown; K. Brown; M. Williams; Hogan	Mike Will Made It; A+ ^{[a]}	3:32
7.	"Up Like Trump"	A. Brown; K. Brown; Sonny Uwaeauoke	Sonny Digital	3:13
8.	"Throw Sum Mo" (featuring Nicki Minaj and Young Thug)	A. Brown; K. Brown; Onika Maraj; Jeffery Williams; M. Williams; Kenneth Coby; Jeremy Felton	Soundz; Mike Will Made It	4:20
9.	"YNO" (featuring Big Sean)	A. Brown; K. Brown; Sean Anderson; M. Williams; Hogan	Mike Will Made It; A+ ^{[a]}	5:24
10.	"No Type"	A. Brown; K. Brown; M. Williams	Mike Will Made It; Swae Lee^{[a]}	3:20
11.	"Safe Sex Pay Checks"	A. Brown; K. Brown; Carlton Mays Jr.; Pierre Slaughter	Honorable C.N.O.T.E.	4:56
Total length:				45:32

Notes

- ^{^a} signifies a co-producer.
- "This Could Be Us" features additional vocals by Jace of Two-9.

Sample credits

- "This Could Be Us" contains a sample from "Burnin' Love" performed by Black Grass.

== Personnel ==
Credits adapted from the album booklet and Allmusic.

Performance

- Rae Sremmurd – primary artists
- Sean "Big Sean" Anderson – featured artist ("YNO")
- Jason "Jace" Harris – featured artist ("Unlock the Swag"), additional vocals ("This Could Be Us")
- Onika "Nicki Minaj" Maraj – featured artist ("Throw Sum Mo")
- Jeffery "Young Thug" Williams – featured artist ("Throw Sum Mo")

Producers

- Michael "Mike Will Made-It" Williams – executive producer, producer (tracks 2, 3, 5, 6, 8, 9 ,10)
- Pierre "P-Nazty" Slaughter – executive producer
- Rae Sremmurd – executive producers
- Jeremy "BackPack" Miller – producer ("Lit Like Bic")
- Carlton "Honorable C.N.O.T.E." Mays – producer ("Safe Sex Pay Checks")
- Sonny "Sonny Digital" Uwaeauoke – producer ("Up Like Trump")
- Kenneth "Soundz" Coby – producer ("Throw Sum Mo")
- Tyree "Young Chop" Pitman – producer ("My X")
- Asheton "A+" Hogan – co-producer (tracks 2, 3, 6, 9)
- Marquel "Marz" Middlebrooks – co-producer ("This Could Be Us")
- Khalif "Swae Lee" Brown – co-producer ("No Type")

Technical

- Todd Bergman – recording assistant ("Throw Sum Mo")
- Maddox Chhim – mixing assistant (tracks 1, 2, 4, 5, 6, 8, 9, 11)
- Aubry "Big Juice" Delaine – engineer ("Throw Sum Mo")
- Stephen Hybicki – engineer (tracks 1, 2, 4, 5, 6, 8, 9, 11), mixing (tracks 3, 9, 10)
- Maximilian Jaeger – engineer ("YNO")
- Jaycen Joshua – mixing (tracks 1, 2, 4, 5, 6, 7, 8, 9, 11)
- Dave Kutch – mastering (whole album)
- Ryan Kaul – mixing assistant (tracks 1, 2, 4, 5, 6, 8, 9, 11)
- Randy Lanphear – engineer ("Unlock the Swag", "This Could Be Us")
- Marquel "Marz" Middlebrooks – engineer ("Up Like Trump", "No Type")
- Cody Seal – engineer ("Come Get Her")
- Pierre "P-Nazty" Slaughter – engineer (tracks 3, 7, 8, 9, 10, 11)
- Gregg Rominiecki – engineer ("YNO")
- Hakeem Wallace – engineer ("Lit Like Bic")
- Michael "Mike Will Made-It" Williams – mixing (whole album)

Miscellaneous

- Ray Alba – publicity
- Chelsea Blythe – A&R coordinator
- Archie Davis – marketing
- Khalfani "Fani" Dennis – stylist
- DJ Mormile – management
- Todd Douglas – business affairs
- Jeremey "Migo The Plug" Ellis – management
- Dan Friedman – management
- Auro Harewood – digital
- Max "Directed By Max" Hliva – videography
- Stephanie Hsu – creative
- Tracy Kies – business affairs
- Justine Massa – creative
- Chris Mortimer – digital
- Aubrey "Aubz" Potter – style, merchandise
- Gunner Safron – marketing
- Pierre "P-Nazty" Slaughter – A&R
- Manny Smith – A&R
- Justin "JusDesignz" Thomas – graphic designer, cover art
- Diwang Valdez – photography
- Brian "Bwrightous" Wright – marketing, creative director

== Charts ==
=== Weekly charts ===
Chart (2015)	Peak position
Belgian Albums (Ultratop Wallonia)	193
Canadian Albums (Billboard)	13
Danish Albums (Hitlisten)	22
Dutch Albums (Album Top 100)	180
Norwegian Albums (VG-lista)	40
Swedish Albums (Sverigetopplistan)	60
UK R&B Albums (Official Charts)	24
US Billboard 200	5
US Top R&B/Hip-Hop Albums (Billboard)	1
US Top Rap Albums (Billboard)	1

=== Year-end charts ===
Chart (2015)	Position
US Billboard 200	39
US Top R&B/Hip-Hop Albums (Billboard)	22
Chart (2016)	Position
US Billboard 200	106

== Certifications ==
Region	Certification	Certified units/sales
Denmark (IFPI Danmark)	Platinum	20,000^{‡}
New Zealand (RMNZ)	Platinum	15,000^{‡}
United Kingdom (BPI)	Silver	60,000^{‡}
United States (RIAA)	2× Platinum	2,000,000^{‡}
^{‡} Sales+streaming figures based on certification alone.
