= Perplexing Pegasus =

2017 single by Rae Sremmurd

Single by Rae Sremmurd

from the album SR3MM
- Released: August 4, 2017
- Genre: Trap
- Length: 3:24
- Label: EarDrummers; Interscope
- Songwriters: Khalif Brown; Aaquil Brown; Michael Williams; Justin Garner; Reginald Smith
- Producers: Mike Will Made It; J-Bo; Kent Luciiano

Rae Sremmurd singles chronology
"Pere" (2017)	"Perplexing Pegasus" (2017)	"Love" (2017)

Music video
- "Perplexing Pegasus" on YouTube

"Perplexing Pegasus" is a song by American hip hop duo Rae Sremmurd, released on August 4, 2017. It is the lead single from their third studio album SR3MM (2018). Mike Will Made It, J-Bo and Kent Luciiano produced the song.

== Background ==
The song was previewed on Twitter by Mike Will Made It in June 2017. In July 2017, Rae Sremmurd announced the song in an interview with Tim Westwood and later its release date. The cover art of the single was drawn by Swae Lee.

Rapper 2 Chainz originally had a verse on the song, but it was removed by Mike Will Made It.

== Composition ==
The song has a trap production featuring "bass-heavy drum pattern, augmented with glitchy cymbals and hi-hats". In it, Rae Sremmurd sing about their lifestyles of luxurious spending and "money, clothes and women". "Pegasus" refers to an expensive foreign car.

== Music video ==
The music video was released on November 17, 2017. It finds Slim Jxmmi and Swae Lee partying in different rooms, surrounded by "weed smoke" and women, blending "'70s style afros with the gaudier looks of the late '90s".

== Charts ==
Chart (2017)	Peak position
Canada Hot 100 (Billboard)	64
New Zealand Heatseekers (RMNZ)	4
US Billboard Hot 100	84
US Hot R&B/Hip-Hop Songs (Billboard)	36

== Certifications ==
Region	Certification	Certified units/sales
Brazil (Pro-Música Brasil)	Gold	30,000^{‡}
United States (RIAA)	Platinum	1,000,000^{‡}
^{‡} Sales+streaming figures based on certification alone.
