= Sremm 4 Life =

Studio album by Rae Sremmurd
- Released: April 7, 2023
- Length: 47:46
- Labels: Ear Drummer; Interscope
- Producers: 30 Roc; Ari PenSmith; Austin Powerz; Banshee the Great; Bizness Boi; Chopsquad DJ; Cubeatz; D-Jay Sremm; Dynox; J-Bo; Jaxx; Keanu Beatz; Melz; Mike Will Made It; Murda Beatz; Oxthello; Oz; Paddy Beats; Pluss; Ronny J; Sav; Sonny Digital; Zaytoven

Rae Sremmurd chronology
SR3MM (2018)	Sremm 4 Life (2023)

Singles from Sremm 4 Life
- 1. "Torpedo" Released: December 30, 2022; 2. "Tanisha (Pump That)" Released: March 10, 2023

Sremm 4 Life is the fourth studio album by American hip-hop duo Rae Sremmurd. It was released through Ear Drummer and Interscope Records on April 7, 2023. The album features guest appearances from Young Thug and Future. Production was handled by Mike Will Made It, Chopsquad DJ, Zaytoven, Paddy Beats, Murda Beatz, Pluss, Oxthello, Jaxx, Keanu Beats, J-Bo, Bizness Boi, Banshee the Great, 30 Roc, Melz, Oz, Cubeatz, Ari PenSmith, Sonny Digital, Austin Powerz, Sav, D-Jay Sremm, Ronny J, and Dynox. The album was supported by two singles, "Torpedo" and "Tanisha (Pump That)". It serves as the follow-up to the duo's previous album, SR3MM (2018), and is their first project after coming out of a five-year-long hiatus.

== Background ==
In March 2020, after social media rumors that Rae Sremmurd had disbanded, Swae Lee from took to social media to assure fans that the duo was staying together and would be releasing a new album, as well as solo releases from both him and his brother, Slim Jxmmi. In an interview with GQ in July 2022, both brothers both spoke on how the album would be different from their previous projects, in which Swae Lee cited English singer-songwriter James Blake as an influence for his melodic vocals and Slim Jxmmi said that they touched on their stepfather's murder that saw their youngest brother serving time in jail in one of the songs.

== Release and promotion ==
The lead single of the album, "Torpedo", was released on December 30, 2022. The second and final single, "Tanisha (Pump That)", was released on March 10, 2023. On the same day, the duo shared the cover art and release date for the album. On March 30, 2023, the duo revealed its tracklist and production credits.

== Critical reception ==
Professional ratings
Aggregate scores
Source	Rating
AnyDecentMusic?	6.9/10
Metacritic	78/100
Review scores
Source	Rating
AllMusic	4/5 stars
Clash	7/10
HipHopDX	4.1/5
MusicOMH	3.5/5 stars
Pitchfork	7.1/10
Rolling Stone	4/5 stars
Slant	3.5/5 stars
Spectrum Culture	3/5 stars

Sremm 4 Life received generally positive reviews from critics. At Metacritic, which assigns a normalized rating out of 100 from mainstream publications, the album received an average score of 78, based on six reviews. Aggregator AnyDecentMusic? gave it 6.9 out of 10, based on their assessment of the critical consensus.

In her review for HipHopDX, Nina Hernandez writes that "the brothers tap into a level of introspection that only comes with age that they’ve never quite harnessed before." Writing for Pitchfork, Stephen Kearse praised the album for "exploring new sounds and real-world themes." AllMusic's Fred Thomas wrote that the album has "incessantly catchy material" that is delivered "with a casual confidence." Writing for Clash, Robin Murray concludes that the album is "sometimes fascinating yet always gripping." Slant's Paul Attard writes that the album is a "clear-eyed showcase for the pair’s innate talents when it comes to crafting pop-rap hits intended for pure revelry." Brittany Spanos of Rolling Stone described the album as a "tight statement from the two that sees them continue to grow and expand the unique sonic world they’ve invented."

=== Year-end lists ===
Critics' rankings for Sremm 4 Life
Publication	Accolade	Rank	Ref.
Rolling Stone	The 100 Best Albums of 2023	95	

== Track listing ==
Sremm 4 Life track listing
No.	Title	Writer(s)	Producer(s)	Length
1.	"Origami (Hotties)"	Aaquil Brown; Khalif Brown; Michael Williams II	Mike Will Made It	3:55
2.	"Royal Flush" (featuring Young Thug)	A. Brown; K. Brown; Jeffery Williams; Darrel Jackson	Chopsquad DJ	3:00
3.	"Mississippi Slide"	A. Brown; K. Brown; Xavier Dotson	Zaytoven	3:00
4.	"Not So Bad (Leans Gone Cold) (Note: The song contains a sample of "Thank you", performed by Dido, and famously sampled in Eminem’s song "Stan".)"	A. Brown; K. Brown; Dido Armstrong; Paul Herman; Patrick Held	Paddy Beats	3:18
5.	"Tanisha (Pump That)"	A. Brown; K. Brown; M. Williams; Pharrell Williams; Charlie Coffeen	Mike Will Made It	2:46
6.	"Bend Ya Knees"	A. Brown; K. Brown; Shane Lindstrom; Asheton Hogan	Murda Beatz; Pluss	2:57
7.	"Activate" (featuring Future)	A. Brown; K. Brown; Nayvadius Wilburn; Othello Houston; Jackson Carroll; Armel Potter	Oxthello; Jaxx	4:42
8.	"Flaunt It/Cheap"	A. Brown; K. Brown; Keanu Torres; Justin Garner; Andre Robertson; Solal Tong Cuong	Keanu Beats; J-Bo; Bizness Boi; Banshee the Great	4:00
9.	"Sexy (Note: The song samples "Nasty Dancer", performed by Kilo Ali.)"	A. Brown; K. Brown; M.; Samuel Gloade; Austin Rogers; Dennis Williams; Thomas McIntosh	Mike Will Made It; 30 Roc	2:58
10.	"YMCA"	A. Brown; K. Brown; Potter	Melz	3:37
11.	"Something I'm Not"	A. Brown; K. Brown; Ozan Yildirim; Tim Gomringer; Kevin Gomringer; Ariowa Irosogie	Oz; Cubeatz; Ari PenSmith	3:17
12.	"Torpedo"	A. Brown; K. Brown; Sonny Uwaezuoke; Austin Schindler; Sav Oguz	Sonny Digital; Austin Powerz; Sav	4:00
13.	"Diamonds Dancing"	A. Brown; K. Brown; Jermarcus Jackson	D-Jay Sremm	2:12
14.	"ADHD Anthem (Too Many Emotions)"	A. Brown; K. Brown; Ronald Spence, Jr.; Brody Fallon	Ronny J; Dynox	3:58
Total length:				47:46

== Charts ==
Chart performance for Sremm 4 Life
Chart (2023)	Peak position
US Billboard 200	28
US Top R&B/Hip-Hop Albums (Billboard)	11
