= This Could Be Us =

Single by Rae Sremmurd

from the album SremmLife
- Released: April 21, 2015
- Recorded: 2014
- Genre: Hip hop
- Length: 3:26
- Label: EarDrummers; Interscope
- Songwriters: A. Brown; K. Brown; Williams; Marquel Middlebrooks
- Producer: Mike Will Made It

Rae Sremmurd singles chronology
"Throw Sum Mo" (2014)	"This Could Be Us" (2015)	"Blasé" (2015)

Music video
- "This Could Be Us" on YouTube

"This Could Be Us" is a song by American hip-hop duo Rae Sremmurd. It was released on April 21, 2015, by EarDrummers and Interscope Records, as the fourth single from their debut album SremmLife. The song was produced by EarDrummers-founder, Mike Will Made It. The song peaked at number 49 on the US Billboard Hot 100. The music video for the song was released on May 12, 2015.

== Music video ==
The music video was released on May 12, 2015. It depicts Swae Lee and Slim Jimmy video-chatting with their girlfriends while in Johannesburg, South Africa. The girls, both left in America, are irritated for not being informed and end up dumping them. In response, both tell their respective girlfriends "Why You Playin". Jasmine V and Dej Loaf make cameos as the boys' girlfriends. The video features landmarks such as the bronze Statue of Nelson Mandela, Nelson Mandela Bridge, Lion Park and the road out of Sandton.

== Credits and personnel ==
Credits adapted from SremmLife booklet.

- Writing – Aaquil Brown, Khalif Brown, Michael Williams II, Marquel Middlebrooks
- Production – Mike Will Made It
- Co-production – Marz
- Additional vocals – Jace
- Recording – Stephen Hybicki and Randy Lanphear at Tree Sound Studios in Atlanta, Georgia
- Audio mixing – Jaycen Joshua and Mike Will Made It at Larrabee Sound Studios in North Hollywood, California
- Assistant mix engineering – Maddox Chhim and Ryand Kaul
- Mastering – Dave Kutch, The Mastering Palace, New York City

== Charts ==
Chart (2015–2016)	Peak position
UK Singles (Official Charts Company)	137
US Billboard Hot 100	49
US Hot R&B/Hip-Hop Songs (Billboard)	15
US Rhythmic Airplay (Billboard)	34

== Certifications ==
Region	Certification	Certified units/sales
Brazil (Pro-Música Brasil)	Platinum	60,000^{‡}
Denmark (IFPI Danmark)	Platinum	90,000^{‡}
New Zealand (RMNZ)	Platinum	30,000^{‡}
United Kingdom (BPI)	Gold	400,000^{‡}
United States (RIAA)	5× Platinum	5,000,000^{‡}
^{‡} Sales+streaming figures based on certification alone.
