= No Flex Zone =

2014 song by Rae Sremmurd

Single by Rae Sremmurd

from the album SremmLife
- Released: May 18, 2014
- Recorded: 2014
- Genre: Hip hop; trap
- Length: 3:51
- Label: EarDrummers; Interscope
- Songwriters: Aaquil Brown; Khalif Brown; Michael Williams II; Asheton Hogan
- Producers: Mike Will Made It; A+

Rae Sremmurd singles chronology
"No Flex Zone" (2014)	"No Type" (2014)

"No Flex Zone" is the debut single by American hip hop duo Rae Sremmurd, consisting of Swae Lee and Slim Jxmmi. It was released on May 18, 2014, by EarDrummers Entertainment and Interscope Records, as the lead single from their debut studio album SremmLife (2015). The song was produced by Mike Will Made It and A+. The hip hop song has since peaked at number 36 on the US Billboard Hot 100 chart. The music video for the song was released on September 18, 2014. The song has been certified 2× Platinum by the RIAA for sales of over one million copies.

== Music video ==
On August 11, 2014, the music video was released. The video depicts Rae Sremmurd holding a party. Comedian Mike Epps makes an appearance in the video.

== Remixes ==
The official remix features guest verses from fellow American rappers, Nicki Minaj and Pusha T, the verses from Pusha T and Nicki Minaj were from their freestyles of the song. West Coast rapper Kid Ink, also remixed the song, featuring Travis Porter and Hardhead.

Another remix was done by rapper Watsky and pop band Karmin with no involvement of the original artist. It interpolates the original chorus.

== In other media ==
The song is heard in an episode of the television series Black-ish. It was also used in a commercial for Wingstop.

== Personnel ==
Credits adapted from SremmLife booklet.

Song credits

- Writing – Aaquil Brown, Khalif Brown, Michael Williams II, Asheton Hogan
- Production – Mike Will Made It
- Co-production – A+
- Recording – P-Nazty at Ear Druma Studios in Atlanta, Georgia
- Audio mixing – Stephen Hybicki and Mike Will Made It at Ear Druma Studios in Atlanta, Georgia
- Mastering – Dave Kutch, The Mastering Palace, New York City

== Charts ==
=== Weekly charts ===
Chart (2014–15)	Peak position
Belgium Urban (Ultratop Flanders)	44
Canada Hot 100 (Billboard)	97
US Billboard Hot 100	36
US Hot R&B/Hip-Hop Songs (Billboard)	11
US Hot Rap Songs (Billboard)	8
US R&B/Hip-Hop Airplay (Billboard)	8
US Rhythmic Airplay (Billboard)	35

=== Year-end charts ===
Chart (2014)	Position
US Hot R&B/Hip-Hop Songs (Billboard)	35

== Certifications ==
Region	Certification	Certified units/sales
Brazil (Pro-Música Brasil)	Gold	30,000^{‡}
United States (RIAA)	3× Platinum	3,000,000^{‡}
^{‡} Sales+streaming figures based on certification alone.
