= Rae Sremmurd =

American hip-hop duo

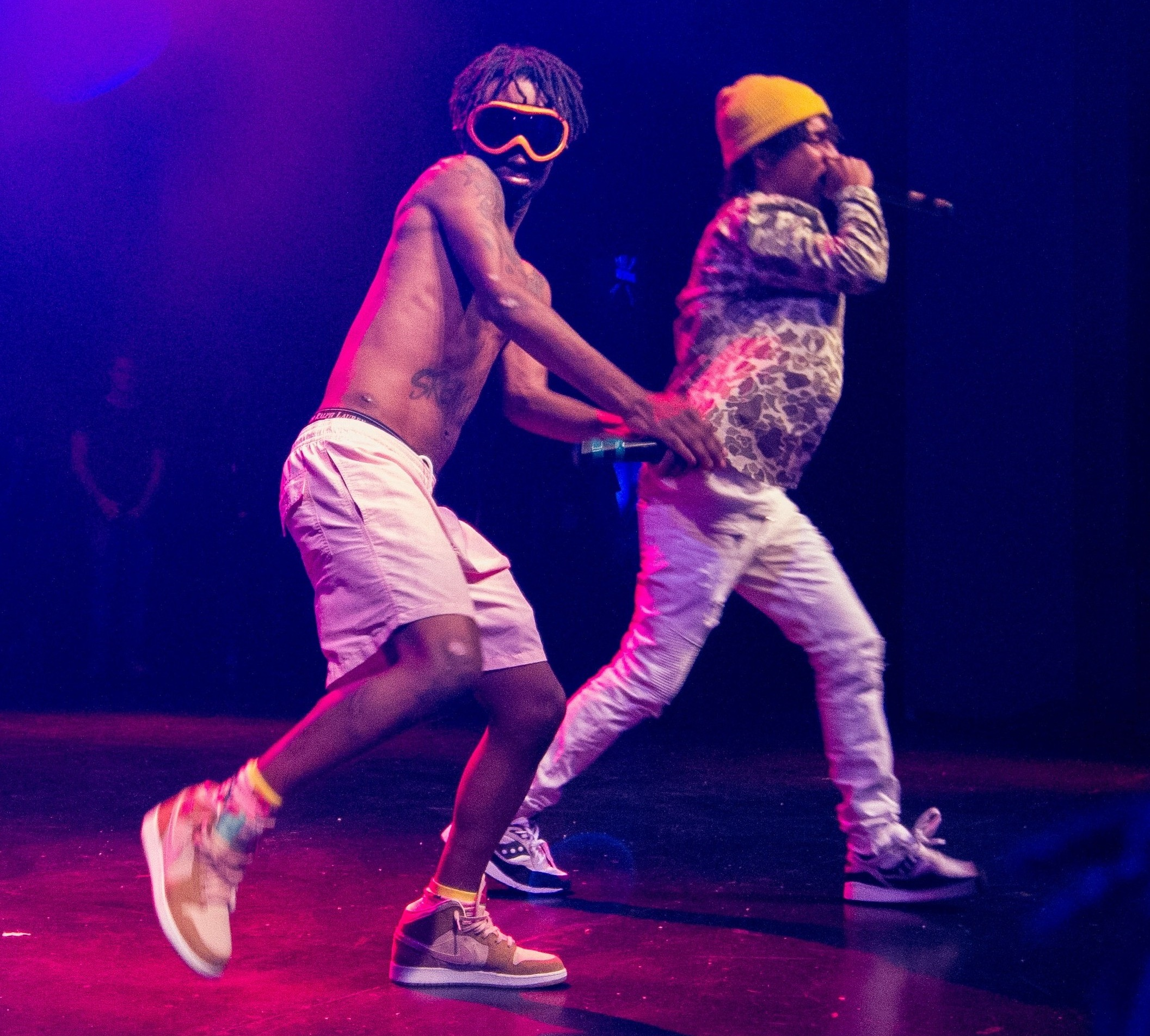
- Slim Jxmmi (left) and Swae Lee (right) performing in 2015

Background information
- Origin: Tupelo, Mississippi, U.S.
- Genres: Hip-hop; trap
- Works: Rae Sremmurd discography
- Years active: 2013–present
- Labels: EarDrummers; Interscope
- Spinoff of: Dem Outta St8 Boyz
- Members: Slim Jxmmi; Swae Lee
- Website: raesremmurd.com
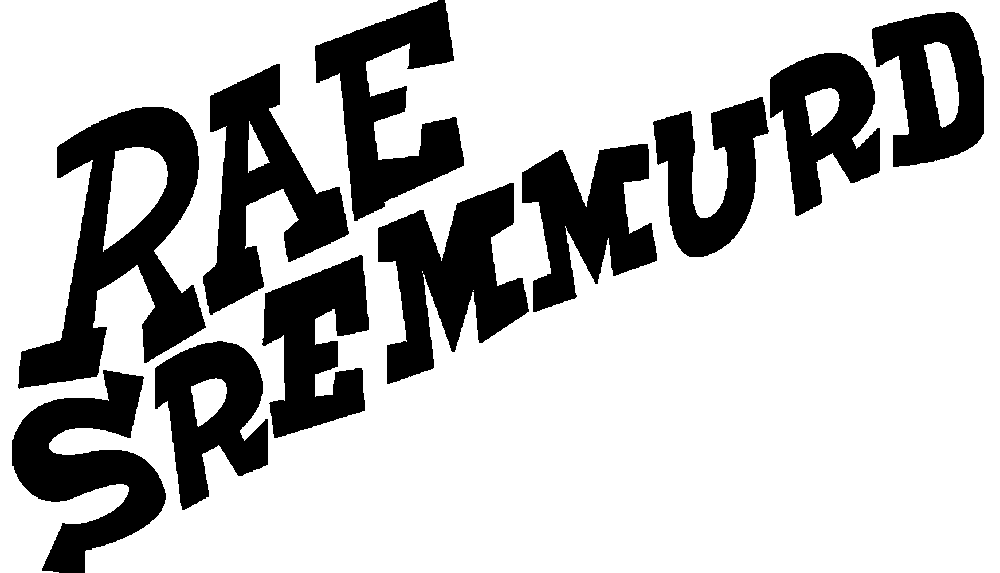

Rae Sremmurd (/ˈreɪ ˈʃrɛmərd/ RAY SHREM-ərd; "Ear Drummers" spelled backwards) is an American hip-hop duo composed of brothers Swae Lee and Slim Jxmmi, both of whom are from Tupelo, Mississippi. They signed with record producer Mike Will Made It's label EarDrummers Records, an imprint of Interscope Records as the first act to sign with the label in 2013.

The duo rose to mainstream prominence following the release of their 2014 singles "No Flex Zone," "No Type" and "Throw Sum Mo" (featuring Nicki Minaj and Young Thug). Each received triple platinum certification by the Recording Industry Association of America (RIAA), peaked within the top 40 of the Billboard Hot 100, and promoted the release of their debut studio album, SremmLife (2015), which itself received double platinum certification. Their 2016 single, "Black Beatles" (featuring Gucci Mane) peaked atop the Billboard Hot 100 and preceded the release of their second album, SremmLife 2 (2016), which was met with continued commercial success. In that same year, the duo also formed the record label SremmLife Crew Records.

Their third album, SR3MM (2018), served as a triple album and peaked at number six on the Billboard 200. Their fourth, Sremm 4 Life (2023), peaked at number 28.

Lee has since shifted focus onto his solo career following the release of his 2018 single, "Sunflower" (with Post Malone).

== Biography ==
=== Early life ===
Aaquil Iben Shaman "Slim Jxmmi" Brown and Khalif Malik Ibn Shaman "Swae Lee" Brown, were born in Whittier, California.

Their mother Bernadette Walker worked for the United States Army and her family was frequently relocated, living in Mississippi, Maryland, and Texas. Slim Jxmmi and Swae Lee started practicing, dancing, and writing music together at an early age.

While they were in middle school, the family moved to the Ida Street nearby Joe Street housing projects in Tupelo, Mississippi, to join Walker's new companion, a man named Floyd Sullivan.

=== 2010–2012: Career beginnings and Dem Outta St8 Boyz ===
The Brown brothers met Jemiah Middlebrooks in Tupelo while he was playing basketball at a local park. They decided to found a hip hop band called "Dem Outta St8 Boyz" with him. Aaquil took the stage name "CaliBoy," Khalif "Kid Krunk," and Jemiah "Lil Pantz." They used money from their part-time jobs to buy equipment and to produce music at home. The two brothers were composing their own beats and the trio were rapping. Visibly inspired by Soulja Boy Tell'Em, the boys released songs and dance videos on social media. It was at the same time that the group first met, and then later became friends with Jermarcus Jackson, aka JJ (today known as Jay Sremm), a young disc jockey, who was studying at Tupelo High School with the two brothers. He since became the DJ of the group.

Shortly after, Bernadette Walker and her companion split up. Following the breakup, the two brothers started skipping school and working more seriously on music. They would return home at late hours, even when they had school the next morning. Their mother, fed up with their schedules, eventually kicked them out of her house, leaving them homeless. They began squatting in an abandoned house in the city with a friend of their stepfather's. They took advantage of the opportunity and organized parties in their new home in order to spread their music.

At the beginning of 2010, the group released the single "Party Animal", which gave them a local fame, allowing them to perform at local festivals and to broadcast their tracks on local radios. Thanks to their savings, the group took part in the auditions of the "Wild Out Wednesday" segment on BET's show 106 & Park in Memphis, Tennessee and succeeded to qualify. They participated on the show of December 8 in New York City and performed "Party Animal". Later, the group met up with an old friend from school named Andre "King Dre" Harris (today known as BoBo Swae), while he was freestyling in the high school courtyard. Andre, originally from West Point, Mississippi, then started collaborating with the trio. Months later, the group finally released their first project, distributed locally.

In the middle of 2011, Lil Pantz left the group due to differences between the trio, and was replaced by Andre. Aaquil and Khalif took the opportunity to change their stage names from "CaliBoy" and "Kid Krunk" to "Weirdo" and "Kid The Great," respectively. Aaquil states he was "Wiz the Kid" for a short time between this name change. In August 2011, the trio once again participated in 106 & Park and performed an original song "My Diddy". They finished second place overall in the competition, and arranged meetings with representatives from record labels Def Jam Recordings and Sony Music. However, they did not sign any record deals at that time.

Around this time, Jemarcus put the group in touch with producer Pierre "P-Nazty" Slaughter, a cousin of his, who had grown up in Tupelo but had moved to Atlanta to work with Mike Will Made It's record label EarDrummers. P-Nazty appreciated the teenagers' music and decided to work with them. Thereby, the three rappers left Tupelo and spent a few months with P-Nazty and Marquel "Marz" Middlebrooks (another EarDrummers producer) in Georgia. They took the opportunity to perform in talent shows and recorded the track "I Dip", produced by Marz, and which increased their popularity a little more. They released their second project "Three Stooges Mixtape" at the beginning of 2012.

Unfortunately, due to financial problems, the boys had to return to their hometown, causing the group to temporarily dissolve. The brothers began working to save money; Aaquil worked at a mattress factory, and Khalif worked at a fast food restaurant where he served burgers. They were working about 12 hours per day. When Aaquil turned 21, he rented an apartment into which Khalif and Andre moved. They began recording music and organizing parties on weekends again. Despite this, the rappers had problems with the police due to noise complaints and with their landlord when they stopped mowing their lawn. Meanwhile, P-Nazty and Marz, aware of the potential and motivation of the trio, tried to convince the rappers to leave their work and to return to Atlanta to try again to succeed in music. After that Aaquil resigned, anticipating that he wouldn't pass a drug test, the trio decided to return to Atlanta thanks to Andre, who had a car.

=== 2013–2015: Early success and SremmLife ===
Back in Georgia, the group performed in local shows, and saw popularity in the Atlanta hip hop scene. P-Nazty introduced them to Mike Will Made It, who decided to sign them on his indie label, Made-It Mafia. In the meantime, King Dre decided to leave the group due to familial reasons and moved to Florida to focus on his studies. The now-duo decided to change their stage names again. The group took as their new name "Rae Sremmurd", derived from Mike Will Made It's production team "EarDrummers" by spelling both words backwards. Aaquil chose the name of "Slim Jimmy" (later stylized as "Slim Jxmmi"), and Khalif opted for first "iHipster Lee" then a few months later "Swae Lee." When Mike Will Made It finalized the creation of his major label "EarDrummers Entertainment" in partnership with Interscope Records, the two brothers became the first artists to sign.

Rae Sremmurd was discovered by the hip hop audience in December 2013, due to their appearance on Mike Will Made It's mixtape "#MikeWiLLBeenTriLL" on the track "We". The track was released as the duo's first promotional single two months later. They also released their second single, "Throw Sum Mo" in the same period. These two songs gave them the opportunity to perform at local clubs and to appear on radio.

In March, they participated in the South by Southwest music festival with Mike Will Made It and performed their first official single, "No Flex Zone", for the first time. At the end of the month, the track was releasing to digital retailers and progressively became popular. The music video of the song was released on August 11, with a guest appearance by American comedian Mike Epps. Finally, the single entered the Billboard Hot 100 on the chart issue dated August 16 and peaked at number 36 on September 20. They also released a remix of the track featuring American rappers Pusha T and Nicki Minaj which helped to increase its popularity. The group was invited to perform the hit single during 2014 BET Hip Hop Awards ceremony, their first performance at a major event.

In the middle of September, they released their second single "No Type" along with its music video shot in Venice Beach. The Mike Will Made It and Swae Lee-produced track quickly became more popular than "No Flex Zone" and entered the U.S. Hot 100 on the chart issue dated October 11 and climbed to number 16 at the beginning of December. It is also the duo's first single to chart outside the US, charting in numerous European countries. Both singles were certified platinum by the Recording Industry Association of America (RIAA) on January 28, 2015. In October, Brooklyn music producer Baauer released the track "One Touch" featuring AlunaGeorge and Rae Sremmurd as lead single from his EP ß. The song failed to chart but was the first collaboration of major artists with the Tupeloan brothers.

In early December, the duo announced the release of their debut album, SremmLife (originally announced as an EP) on January 6, 2015 and re-released "Throw Sum Mo" as their third single, adding guest vocals of Young Thug and Nicki Minaj to promote the project. The new single debuted at number 92 on the Billboard Hot 100 on January 17 and peaked at number 30 in its fifteenth week of gradually climbing up the chart.

2015 was the breakthrough year for Rae Sremmurd. SremmLife was welcomed with surprise and enthusiasm from public and music critics. Pushed by the success of the two first singles, the album debuted at number five on the Billboard 200 chart, with first-week sales of 49,000 copies, powered by 34,000 in traditional album sales. It received positive reviews from music journalism praising the energy and the cleverness of the duo. At the same time, Swae and Jxmmi received their first certifications with the platinum certifications of the two first singles of the album by the Recording Industry Association of America (RIAA) on January 28, 2015.

In May, they released "This Could Be Us" as the fourth single off their project with a music video shot during a trip in South Africa. The track peaked at number 49 on the Hot 100 in September. In June, Ty Dolla Sign teamed up with the duo and Future on his DJ Spinz produced single "Blasé" which peaked at number 63 in November. In July, they participated in their first concert tour as opening acts to Nicki Minaj's North American leg of "The Pinkprint Tour" along with Meek Mill, Dej Loaf and Tinashe.

Shortly after Minaj's tour, they debuted their own first worldwide concert tour, "SremmLife Tour". The tour began in September and brought them to Oceania, American colleges and finally Europe at the end of the year. During the Oceanian leg of the tour, they released the fifth and last single off "SremmLife", "Come Get Her" along with its music video. It peaking at number 56 on the Billboard Hot 100 in November.

Increasingly popular, the duo was nominated for numerous musical awards ceremonies during the year, including the BET Awards, the Billboard Music Awards, and the BET Hip Hop Awards, and won their first award, the BET Award for Best Group in June.

At the end of 2015, "SremmLife" had been nominated by numerous magazines as one of the best albums of the year. Complex ranked the album as the third best of the year. This decision sparked a feud between the duo and Hot 97 radio presenter Ebro Darden, who thought that the album should not appear on the list.

SremmLife was finally certified platinum in June 2016, along with the three last singles of the album.

=== 2016–2018: SremmLife 2 and SR3MM ===
On June 16, 2016, Rae Sremmurd announced that their next album, SremmLife 2, would be released on August 12, 2016. The album included their first Billboard Hot 100 number-one song "Black Beatles", which topped the chart in the issue dated November 26, 2016. It also gave Gucci Mane his first number one.

The two brothers began working on their own solo albums. Slim Jxmmi announced his "Uncle Jxm" project, and on August 12, 2016, Swae Lee announced his debut solo album, Swaecation. Swae Lee also announced that the two brothers were working on a new album, called SremmLife 3. On August 4, 2017, the duo released a new single titled "Perplexing Pegasus".

In early 2018, Rae Sremmurd and Mike Will Made It announced that Swae Lee and Slim Jxmmi would release their solo albums—Swaecation and Jxmtroduction—in the same package as SremmLife 3, as a triple album package called SR3MM. The duo released "T'd Up" as SremmLife 3's second single on February 5, 2018, and released three singles from SR3MM on March 1, 2018 - Swae Lee's "Hurt to Look", Slim Jxmmi's "Brxnks Truck", and the duo's "Powerglide" featuring previous collaborator Juicy J. On May 4, 2018, the duo released SR3MM, a triple disc set that included solo projects for each of the members. Overall, SR3MM received mainly positive reviews from critics.

=== 2021-2023: Sremm 4 Life ===
During summer 2021 at their Rolling Loud venue in Miami the family duo performed a snippet of their then to be lead single "I Don't Mind", with lack of enthusiasm from the audience. The single and video release of I Don't Mind was shelved as a result. On May 31, 2022, the brothers teased their fourth studio album, titled Sremm 4 Life. They followed this up on June 6 with their first single since 2018, "Denial", which was released in addition to a music video, on June 8, 2022. "Community D**k" featuring Hip-Hop Musician Flo Milli was released with an accompanying music video on August 8, 2022, both singles "Denial" and "Community D*ck" were not put onto the album instead a whole new tracklist was put together. The album's eventual lead single, "Torpedo", was released with an accompanying music video on December 30. Another single, "Sucka or Sum", was released alongside its music video on January 27, 2023.

On March 9, the release date for Sremm4Life. On March 10, 2023, the second single "Tanisha (Pump That)" was released. The album was released on April 7.

== SremmLife Crew Records ==
SremmLife Crew Records
- Founded: March 10, 2016
- Founder: Rae Sremmurd
- Defunct: August 24, 2017
- Status: Defunct
- Distributor: EMPIRE Distribution
- Genre: Hip-hop; trap
- Country of origin: United States
- Location: Tupelo, Mississippi; Los Angeles, California
- Official website: sremmlifecrew.com

SremmLife Crew Records was a record label founded by Rae Sremmurd in 2016. They signed Mississippi native rappers with whom they worked before their major success. The label's first official release was the collective project Trail Mix in March 2016, introducing all members of the crew.

The company was shut down on August 24, 2017.

=== Artists ===
Artists	Year signed	Albums released	Description
Slim Jxmmi	Founders	1	Rae Sremmurd members.
Swae Lee	Founders	1	Rae Sremmurd members.
Impxct		1	Rapper from Shannon, Mississippi.
Riff 3x		1	Rapper from Tupelo, Mississippi. Cousin of Jay Sremm.
Bobo Swae		0	Rapper that helped to form Rae Sremmurd.

In-house disc jockeys

- Jay Sremm
- DJ Jon Wells
- Uncle Jxm (Slim Jxmmi pseudonym as DJ)

=== Releases ===
The following is the list of all albums released through SremmLife Crew Records.

Artist	Album	Details
Various Artists	Trail Mix	Released: March 15, 2016; Format: Digital download
Impxct	One of a Kind	Released: March 14, 2017; Format: Digital download

== Discography ==
- SremmLife (2015)
- SremmLife 2 (2016)
- SR3MM (2018)
- Sremm 4 Life (2023)

== Awards and nominations ==
=== BET Awards ===
Rae Sremmurd has been nominated for seven BET Awards and won one award.

Year	Nominee / work	Award	Result	Ref.
2015	"Throw Sum Mo" (with Nicki Minaj and Young Thug)	Coca-Cola Viewers' Choice Award	Nominated	
2015	Rae Sremmurd	Best New Artist	Nominated	
2015	Rae Sremmurd	Best Group	Won	
2016	Rae Sremmurd	Best Group	Nominated	
2017	Rae Sremmurd	Best Group	Nominated	
2017	"Black Beatles" (with Gucci Mane)	Best Collaboration	Nominated	
2017	"Black Beatles" (with Gucci Mane)	Coca-Cola Viewers' Choice Award	Nominated	

=== BET Hip Hop Awards ===
The BET Hip Hop Awards are hosted annually by BET for hip hop performers, producers and music video directors.

Year	Nominee / work	Award	Result	Ref.
2015	Rae Sremmurd	Who Blew Up Award	Nominated	
2015	"No Type"	People's Champ Award	Nominated	

=== Billboard Music Awards ===
The Billboard Music Award is an honor given by Billboard, a publication and music popularity chart covering the music business. Rae Sremmurd has won one award from five nominations.

Year	Nominee / work	Award	Result	Ref.
2015	Rae Sremmurd	Top Rap Artist	Nominated	
2017	Rae Sremmurd	Top Rap Artist	Nominated	
2017	"Black Beatles" (with Gucci Mane)	Top Rap Song	Nominated	
2017	"Black Beatles" (with Gucci Mane)	Top Rap Collaboration	Won	
2017	"Black Beatles" (with Gucci Mane)	Top Streaming Song (Video)	Nominated	

=== International Dance Music Awards ===
Year	Nominee / work	Award	Result	Ref.
2016	"Throw Sum Mo" (with Nicki Minaj and Young Thug)	Best Rap/Hip Hop/Trap Dance Track	Nominated	

=== MTVU Woodie Awards ===
The MTVU Woodie Awards are semi-annual awards presented by MTVU which it states recognizes "the music voted best by college students."

Year	Nominee / work	Award	Result	Ref.
2015	Rae Sremmurd	Artist To Watch	Nominated	

=== Nickelodeon Kids' Choice Awards ===
The Nickelodeon Kids' Choice Awards, is an annual awards show that airs on the Nickelodeon cable channel, that honors the year's biggest television, movie, and music acts, as voted by Nickelodeon viewers.

Year	Nominee / work	Award	Result	Ref.
2017	Rae Sremmurd	Favorite New Artist	Nominated	

=== Southern Entertainment Awards ===
Year	Nominee / work	Award	Result	Ref.
2015	SremmLife	Album Of The Year	Nominated	
2015	Rae Sremmurd	Group / Label Of The Year	Nominated	

== Tours ==
Headlining tours

- SremmLife Tour (2015)
- SremmLife II Tour (2016–2017)

Supporting act

- The Pinkprint Tour (for Nicki Minaj (2015)
- The Dedication Tour (for Lil Wayne) (2016)
- The Formation World Tour (for Beyoncé) (2016)
- Starboy: Legend of the Fall Tour (for the Weeknd) (2017)
- Dazed & Blazed Tour (for Wiz Khalifa) (2018)
- This Is America Tour (for Childish Gambino) (2018)
- Twelve Carat Tour (for Post Malone) (2023)
