= No Type =

Single by Rae Sremmurd

from the album SremmLife
- Released: September 15, 2014
- Recorded: 2014
- Genre: Hip hop; trap
- Length: 3:21
- Label: EarDrummers; Interscope
- Songwriters: Aaquil Brown; Khalif Brown; Michael Williams II
- Producers: Mike Will Made It; Swae Lee

Rae Sremmurd singles chronology
"No Flex Zone" (2014)	"No Type" (2014)	"Throw Sum Mo" (2014)

"No Type" is a hip hop song by American hip hop duo Rae Sremmurd. It was released on September 15, 2014, by EarDrummers Entertainment and Interscope Records, as the second single from their debut studio album SremmLife (2015). The song was produced by Mike Will Made It with additional production from Swae Lee. The song has peaked at number 16 on the US Billboard Hot 100 chart, becoming their second highest-charting single behind "Black Beatles".

== Music video ==
The music video was directed by Max and released on August 11, 2014. As of May 2024, it has received roughly 900 million views on YouTube.

== In other media ==
The song is used in the television series Black-ish and the film American Honey.

== Personnel ==
Credits adapted from SremmLife album booklet.

Song credits

- Writing – Aaquil Brown, Khalif Brown, Michael Williams II
- Production – Mike Will Made It
- Co-production – Swae Lee
- Recording – P-Nazty and Marz at Ear Druma Studios in Atlanta, Georgia
- Audio mixing – Stephen Hybicki and Mike Will Made It at Ear Druma Studios in Atlanta, Georgia
- Mastering – Dave Kutch, The Mastering Palace, New York City

== Commercial performance ==
The song has been certified 7× Platinum by the Recording Industry Association of America (RIAA).

== Charts ==
Chart (2014–2015)	Peak position
Belgium (Ultratip Bubbling Under Flanders)	82
Belgium Urban (Ultratop Flanders)	24
Canada Hot 100 (Billboard)	51
Denmark (Tracklisten)	29
France (SNEP)	165
UK Hip Hop/R&B (OCC)	14
UK Singles (Official Charts Company)	93
US Billboard Hot 100	16
US Hot R&B/Hip-Hop Songs (Billboard)	3
US Hot Rap Songs (Billboard)	2
US Rhythmic Airplay (Billboard)	22

=== Year-end charts ===
Chart (2014)	Position
US Hot R&B/Hip-Hop Songs (Billboard)	53
Chart (2015)	Position
US Billboard Hot 100	70
US Hot R&B/Hip-Hop Songs (Billboard)	25

== Certifications ==
Region	Certification	Certified units/sales
Australia (ARIA)	Platinum	70,000^{‡}
Brazil (Pro-Música Brasil)	2× Platinum	120,000^{‡}
Denmark (IFPI Danmark)	Platinum	90,000^{‡}
Germany (BVMI)	Gold	200,000^{‡}
New Zealand (RMNZ)	Platinum	30,000^{‡}
Sweden (GLF)	Gold	20,000^{‡}
United Kingdom (BPI)	Gold	400,000^{‡}
United States (RIAA)	7× Platinum	7,000,000^{‡}
^{‡} Sales+streaming figures based on certification alone.
