= Throw Sum Mo =

Single by Rae Sremmurd featuring Nicki Minaj and Young Thug

from the album SremmLife
- Released: December 9, 2014
- Recorded: 2014
- Genre: Hip hop
- Length: 4:20
- Label: EarDrummers; Interscope
- Songwriters: Aaquil Brown; Khalif Brown; Onika Maraj; Jeffery Williams; Michael Williams II; Kenneth Coby; Jeremy Felton
- Producers: Mike Will Made It; Soundz

Rae Sremmurd singles chronology
| "No Type" (2014) | "Throw Sum Mo" (2014) | "This Could Be Us" (2015) |

Nicki Minaj singles chronology
| "Bed of Lies" (2014) | "Throw Sum Mo" (2014) | "Truffle Butter" (2015) |

Young Thug singles chronology
| "Low" (2014) | "Throw Sum Mo" (2014) | "Check" (2015) |

Music video
- "Throw Sum Mo" on YouTube

"Throw Sum Mo" is a song by American hip hop duo Rae Sremmurd featuring rappers Nicki Minaj and Young Thug. It was released on December 9, 2014, by EarDrummers Entertainment and Interscope Records, as the third single from the duo's debut studio album, SremmLife (2015). The song was produced by Mike Will Made-It and Soundz. The music video for the song was released on March 15, 2015. The song was nominated for the Coca-Cola Viewers' Choice Award at the BET Awards 2015.

== Music video ==
The video features Rae Sremmurd in a skating rink with Nicki Minaj and Young Thug, along with cameo appearances from Mike Will Made It, Birdman and Migos.Voices from music industry legends can also be heard. Afro beats are also used

== Credits and personnel ==
Credits adapted from SremmLife booklet.

Song credits

- Writing – Aaquil Brown, Khalif Brown, Kenneth Coby, Michael Williams II, Jeremih, Onika Maraj, Jeffery Williams
- Production – Soundz and Mike Will Made It
- Recording – Stephen Hybicki at Mean Street Studios in Atlanta, Georgia and P-Nazty at Ear Druma Studios in Atlanta, Georgia
- Nicki Minaj verse recording – Aubry "Big Juice" Delaine at Glenwood Place Studios in Burbank, California
- Nicki Minaj verse recording assistant – Todd Bergman
- Audio mixing – Jaycen Joshua and Mike Will Made It at Larrabee Sound Studios in North Hollywood, California
- Assistant mix engineering – Maddox Chhim and Ryand Kaul
- Mastering – Dave Kutch, The Mastering Palace, New York City

== Charts ==
| Chart (2014–15) | Peak position |
|---|---|
| US Billboard Hot 100 | 30 |
| US Hot R&B/Hip-Hop Songs (Billboard) | 12 |
| US R&B/Hip-Hop Airplay (Billboard) | 1 |
| US Rhythmic Airplay (Billboard) | 7 |

== Certifications ==
| Region | Certification | Certified units/sales |
|---|---|---|
| Brazil (Pro-Música Brasil) | Gold | 30,000^{‡} |
| New Zealand (RMNZ) | Gold | 15,000^{‡} |
| United States (RIAA) | 3× Platinum | 3,000,000^{‡} |
^{‡} Sales+streaming figures based on certification alone.
