= R3set =

Studio album by Mike Will Made It
- Released: March 20, 2026
- Recorded: 2021–2026
- Genre: Hip-hop
- Length: 50:36
- Label: Ear Drummer; Giant
- Producer: 30 Roc; 8 Major; Almer Ament; Hiddie Ament; Bass Charity; Big Cuz; BJ Burton; Chopsquad DJ; Shawn Ferrari; Carson Hackney; John Jay Henry; Michael Christian Johnson; Simon Jonasson; Jesper Langerak; London on da Track; Melz; Mike Will Made It; Pluss; Sonny Digital; Teezo Touchdown; Albin Tengblad; TrueBeatzz; Zaytoven

Mike Will Made It chronology
Dirty Nachos (2024)	R3set (2026)

Singles from R3set
- 1. "Rooms" Released: February 13, 2026; 2. "Standing O" Released: March 6, 2026; 3. "In My H3ad" Released: March 18, 2026; 4. "Deeper" Released: March 19, 2026; 5. "My Way" Released: March 26, 2026

R3set is the second studio album by American record producer Mike Will Made It. It was released on March 20, 2026, by Ear Drummer Records and Giant Music. The album features guest appearances by 2 Chainz, 21 Savage, Anycia, CeeLo Green, Chief Keef, Hunxho, J Money, J. Cole, Karrahbooo, Killer Mike, Lil Keed, Ludacris, Monaleo, OJ da Juiceman, SahBabii, Sid Sriram, T.I., Teezo Touchdown, Travis Porter, Young Dro, Young Thug and YoungBoy Never Broke Again. It features notable productions by Mike Will Made It himself, 30 Roc, BJ Burton, Chopsquad DJ, London on da Track, Pluss, Sonny Digital, Teezo Touchdown and Zaytoven. It is his first full-length studio album since Ransom 2 (2017).

== Singles ==
On July 30, 2024, Mike Will Made It released a promotional single for the album entitled High3r, which features Lil Wayne and Lil Yachty.

On February 13, 2026, he released the first official single of the album entitled Rooms, which features YoungBoy Never Broke Again and Chief Keef.

On March 6, 2026, he released the second single of the album entitled Standing O, which features Monaleo and Travis Porter.

On March 18, 2026, he released the third single of the album entitled In My Head, which features Lil Keed.

On March 19, 2026, he released the fourth single of the album entitled D33p3r, which features Ludacris and Teezo Touchdown.

== Track listing ==
R3set track listing
No.	Title	Writer(s)	Producer(s)	Length
1.	"ATL (Appreciate the Love)" (with 21 Savage)	Michael Williams II; Shéyaa Abraham-Joseph; London Holmes; John Jay Henry; Carl Thompson Jr.; Sean Combs; Faith Evans; Floyd Howard	Mike Will Made It; London on da Track; Henry	3:25
2.	"Standing O" (with Monaleo and Travis Porter)	M. Williams; Leondra Caldwell; Lakeem Grant; Donquez Woods; Harold Duncan; Ernest Day Jr	Mike Will Made It; Shawn Ferrari	2:18
3.	"Time" (with SahBabii)	M. Williams; Saaheem Valdery; Samuel Gloade; Chevez Clarke	Mike Will Made It; 30 Roc; 8 Major; Big Cuz	3:27
4.	"Russian Roulette" (with Young Thug)	M. Williams; Jeffery Williams; Asheton Hogan	Mike Will Made It; Pluss	3:47
5.	"My Way" (with J Money, Karrahbooo and Anycia)	M. Williams II; Eddie Miller; Karrah Schuster; Anycia Edwards; Sonny Uwaezuoke	Mike Will Made It; Sonny Digital	3:16
6.	"@ 874" (with Hunxho and 2 Chainz)	M. Williams; Ibrahim Dodo; Tauheed Epps; Hogan; Harissis Tsakmaklis; Jorge Cardoso; Feliciano Ponce; Luzian Tuetsch; Michael Johnson	Mike Will Made It; Pluss; Bass Charity; Johnson	2:52
7.	"Deeper" (with Ludacris and Teezo Touchdown)	M. Williams; Christopher Bridges; Aaron Thomas; Albin Tengblad; Lefabian Williams; Tracey Sewell; Dennis Butler; Simon Jonasson; Carlos Walker	Mike Will Made It; Pluss; Teezo Touchdown; Tengblad; Melz; Jonasson	3:25
8.	"Rooms" (with YoungBoy Never Broke Again and Chief Keef)	M. Williams; Kentrell Gaulden; Keith Cozart; Adrian Brown; Kentavious Burney	Mike Will Made It; TrueBeatzz	3:52
9.	"OFG!" (with J. Cole)	M. Williams; Jermaine Cole; Hogan; Gloade	Mike Will Made It; Pluss; 30 Roc	3:12
10.	"Stove Lit" (with OJ da Juiceman)	M. Williams; Otis Williams Jr.; Gloade	Mike Will Made It; 30 Roc	3:33
11.	"Money Talks" (with T.I., Killer Mike and Young Dro)	M. Williams; Clifford Harris; Michael Render; D'Juan Hart; Xavier Dotson; Lamont Porter; James Bedford; Christopher Wallace; Kimberly Jones; Roy Ayers; Sylvia Striplin	Mike Will Made It; Zaytoven	3:22
12.	"AAA" (with Sid Sriram)	M. Williams; Sidharth Sriram	Mike Will Made It	3:08
13.	"In My Head" (with Lil Keed)	M. Williams; Raqhid Render; Darrell Gregory Jackson; Denzel Butler	Mike Will Made It; Chopsquad DJ	2:48
14.	"All I Know" (with CeeLo Green)	M. Williams; Thomas Callaway; Brandon Burton	Mike Will Made It; BJ Burton; Belz	3:49
15.	"Major" (featuring Swae Lee)	M. Williams; Khalif Brown; Almer Ament; Carson Hackney; Hiddie Ament; Jesper Langerak	Mike Will Made It; A. Ament; H. Ament; Hackney; Langerak	4:22
Total length:				50:36

== Personnel ==
Credits are adapted from Tidal.

- Mike Dean – mastering (all tracks), mixing (tracks 8, 15)
- Spydasmix – engineering (1, 10, 13)
- MRII – engineering (2, 3, 5, 7, 11, 12)
- Kidmaestro – engineering (2)
- Bainz – engineering (4), mixing (4)
- Nolan – engineering (6)
- Gerald "The Sound" Keys Jr. – engineering (7)
- BlokkOnDa808s – engineering (8)
- Gage – engineering (8)
- Kuldeep Chudasama – engineering (9)
- Rell – engineering (12)
- Young Slade – engineering (14)
- Randy Lanphear – engineering (15)
- Sage Skolfield – mixing (1–3, 6, 7, 9, 10–14)
- Jess Jackson – mixing (4)
- Ant Mixed It – mixing (5)
- Sean Solymar – mixing (6, 10, 12–14)

== Charts ==
Chart performance for R3set
Chart (2026)	Peak position
US Billboard 200	172
