= Sledgehammer (Rihanna song) =

Single by Rihanna
- Written: 2014
- Released: June 27, 2016
- Genre: Electropop
- Length: 3:31
- Label: Westbury Road; Roc Nation
- Songwriters: Robyn Fenty; Jesse Shatkin; Sia Furler
- Producers: Kuk Harrell; Jesse Shatkin

Rihanna singles chronology
"Nothing Is Promised" (2016)	"Sledgehammer" (2016)	"Too Good" (2016)

Music video
- "Sledgehammer" on YouTube

"Sledgehammer" (Note: Subtitled "(From The Motion Picture "Star Trek Beyond")".) is a song recorded by the Barbadian singer Rihanna. It was released on June 27, 2016, through Westbury Road Entertainment and Roc Nation as a single to promote Star Trek Beyond (2016). It plays during the film's closing credits but is not included on the film's soundtrack. Rihanna wrote the song with Sia Furler and Jesse Shatkin, who produced it with Kuk Harrell. A music video for the song was released on June 30, 2016, and shows Rihanna performing magical acts on a foreign planet. The video was shot entirely on IMAX cameras. Musically, "Sledgehammer" is a mid-tempo electropop ballad, featuring an anthemic chorus, heavy synthesizers and electronic rhythms.

== Background and release ==
On June 26, 2016, Rihanna hinted that she would release a new song, stating on Instagram, "Got something for y'all tomorrow". Over two years prior, Rihanna tweeted, "You're just another brick and I'm a sledgehammer", hinting that she had been working on the song since 2014. The song was written collaboratively by Rihanna, Sia and Jesse Shatkin. Rihanna and Sia had previously worked together on the former's 2012 song, "Diamonds".

A new trailer for Star Trek Beyond featuring "Sledgehammer", was released on June 27, 2016, the same day that the song was released. Rihanna subsequently said that she had been a fan of the Star Trek franchise since she was a child, after being introduced to it by her father. She explained that "This is something that's been a part of me since my childhood, it's never left me, I love Star Trek. It was automatic. I would do anything in terms of music. It's such a big deal not only as a fan, as a musician... because Star Trek is such a big deal across the globe."

== Composition ==
The song is a piano ballad written in the key of D major with a slow tempo of 65.5 beats per minute in common time. It follows a chord progression of D – B♭ (B♭/C in the coda) – Gm, and Rihanna's vocals span from G_{3} to F♯_{5}.

== Critical reception ==
Camila Cassidy of The Edge gave the song a generally positive review stating, "She pretty much nailed it – it feels tone perfect. It's a little orchestral, swooping, but with a strong enough chorus and verse pattern to be commercially successful." However she also stated, "As a dramatic theatrical piece? It's a little weak, too much fuss with the lyrics while instrumentation takes a back seat. As a radio hit? The vocals aren't prominent enough...Both are excellent, but both just need to be more." Daniel Kreps from Rolling Stone wrote, "Rihanna sings on the aching chorus, which sports a monster hook typical of Sia's work." Rachel Sonis from Idolator gave the song a 7/10, stating, "The Aussie singer-songwriter knows exactly how vast Rih[anna]’s vocal abilities are and isn't afraid to push them. No doubt, this probably came in handy, since “Sledgehammer” — from Rihanna's haunting drones to the song's thunderous melody — is a monster of a track." A Bit of Pop Music wrote, "‘Sledgehammer’ is a powerful pop ballad with a huge chorus, that should do well in combination with the probable success of its movie...but it might be time for Sia to shake up her formula a bit, as ‘Sledgehammer’ is in no way a surprising composition."

== Music video ==
A music video for the song premiered June 30, 2016 in IMAX theaters at 9:00am EST. The video was then released onto Vevo and Tidal an hour later. The music video was the first to be shot entirely with IMAX cameras. The music video features Rihanna dressed in a sci-fi costume performing magical acts, with Swarm Ships from Star Trek Beyond flying around her. At the video's ending, Rihanna turns into a celestial god, face to "face" with the USS Enterprise.

The video was shot at the Trona Pinnacles by director Floria Sigismondi.

== Charts ==
=== Weekly charts ===
Chart (2016)	Peak position
Australia (ARIA)	69
Belgium (Ultratop 50 Flanders)	40
Canada Hot 100 (Billboard)	72
France (SNEP)	60
New Zealand Heatseekers (Recorded Music NZ)	6
Sweden Heatseeker (Sverigetopplistan)	5
UK Singles (OCC)	69
US Bubbling Under Hot 100 (Billboard)	2
US Adult Contemporary (Billboard)	16
US Adult Pop Airplay (Billboard)	40
US Hot R&B/Hip-Hop Songs (Billboard)	36

=== Year-end charts ===
Chart (2016)	Position
US Adult Contemporary (Billboard)	48

== Certifications and sales ==
Certifications
Region	Certification	Certified units/sales
Brazil (Pro-Música Brasil)	Gold	30,000^{‡}
^{‡} Sales+streaming figures based on certification alone.

== Release history ==
Release dates and formats
Region	Date	Format(s)	Label(s)	Ref.
Various	June 27, 2016	Digital download; streaming	Westbury Road; Roc Nation	
United States	June 27, 2016	Adult contemporary radio; hot adult contemporary radio	Roc Nation; Def Jam	
United Kingdom	July 29, 2016	CD single	Virgin EMI; Roc Nation	
New Zealand	July 29, 2016	Contemporary hit radio	Universal	
