= Soundtrack Beat Battle =

- Genre: producer's competition
- Frequency: Annually (bi-monthly ongoing event)
- Locations: Nashville, Tennessee
- Years active: 2
- Inaugurated: 2010
- Most recent: ongoing
- Website: www.soundtrackbeatbattle.com

Soundtrack Beat Battle is a Nashville-based producers competition where beat makers compete on stage for a grand prize. Founded in January 2010 by singer/songwriter and producer Coko Korinne, producers compete in live monthly beat battles to progress to the Grand Finale, where a winner is selected by a judging panel of music celebrities and record label executives. Since 2010, various judges include Bryan Michael Cox, Boi-1da, Nitti Beats, Def Jam, Atlantic Records, Nipsey Hussle, Warner Music Group, Johnny Juliano, and many others. The Grand Prize includes a production kit from Big Fish Audio, a trip to Los Angeles for a pitch meeting with the VP of Urban A&R at Sony/ATV Music Publishing, $1000, and a recording session and music video with rapper MIMS.

== History ==
The Soundtrack Beat Battle was created and launched in January 2010 by singer, songwriter, and producer Coko Korinne. Korinne claims the idea was inspired by the story of the "Apple Juice Kid" she read in Producer's Edge. She's quoted "He got his start from entering beat battles and I always wondered what I could do to shine the spotlight on people behind the scenes. As a producer and songwriter, I know how hard it can be to gain exposure. After reading the article, I did additional research and took steps to create my own beat battle." The annual event is one of the first of its size in Tennessee and is already known as one of the most competitive beat battles in the nation. Soundtrack Beat Battle has included international competitors from Canada, the United Kingdom, and Italy.

== Overview ==
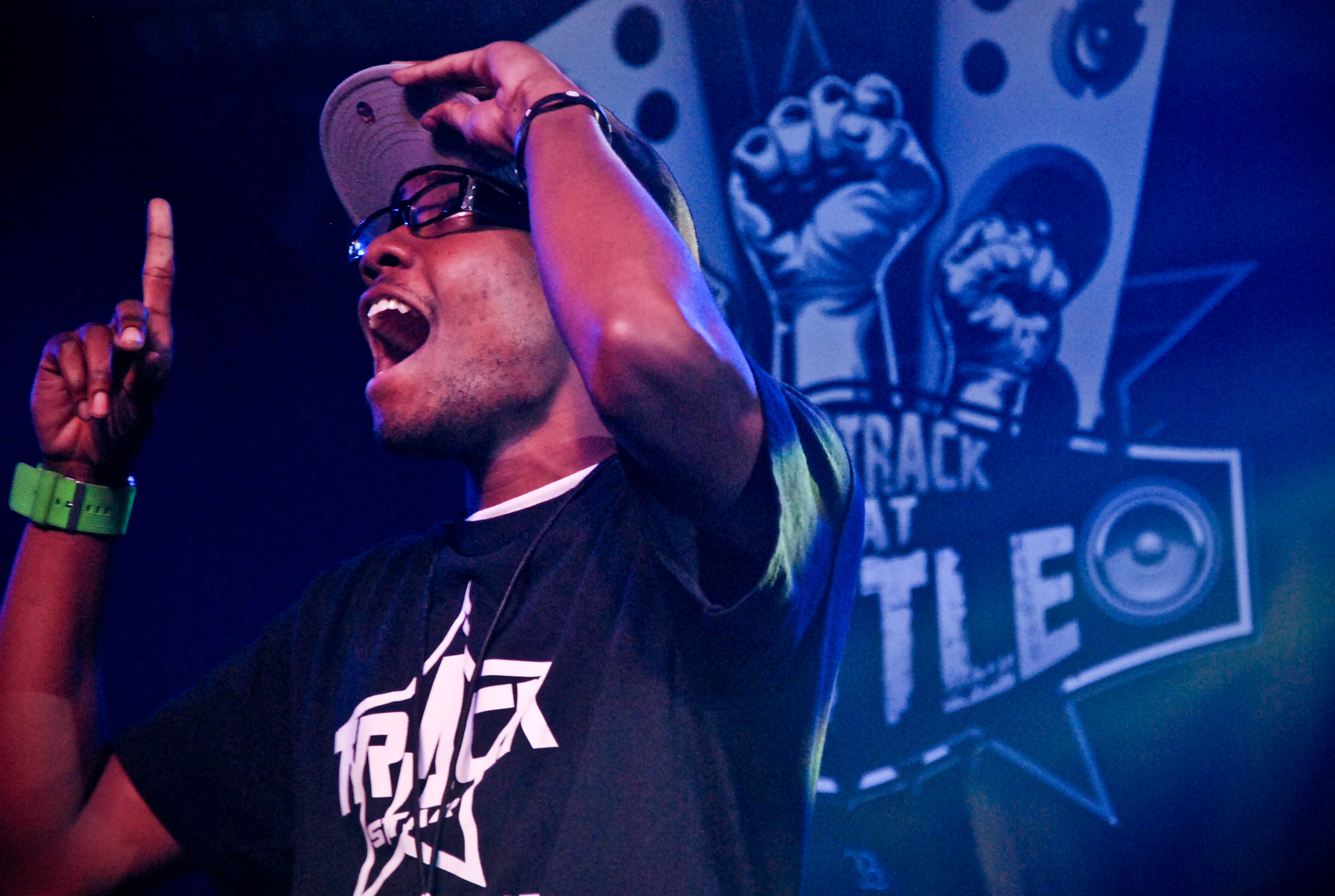
Runner-up Yeyo Beatz, March 26, 2011

=== Format ===
Every other month the Soundtrack Beat Battle selects 14 contestants from across the United States and internationally to compete live in front of an audience and guest judges. During each monthly event, two randomly selected producers are given an allotted amount of time to go on stage and play two beats at 60 seconds each. Whoever wins proceeds to the next round, and Whoever loses is asked to remain in the audience in case they are picked as the 'wild card'. The 'wild card' contestant is a producer who gets invited back to the stage for a second chance after they lost in their first round. The 1st-place winner and runner-up from each monthly battle are then invited to the Grand Finale Beat Battle in Nashville, Tennessee.

=== Venues ===
The events are held in various venues in Nashville, Tennessee. In 2010 the beat battles were held at Rocketown. The final event was again at Rocketown on July 24. After the success of the 2010 beat battle, the Soundtrack Beat Battle decided to move to the larger, more upscale venue Limelight in January 2011.

=== Judging ===
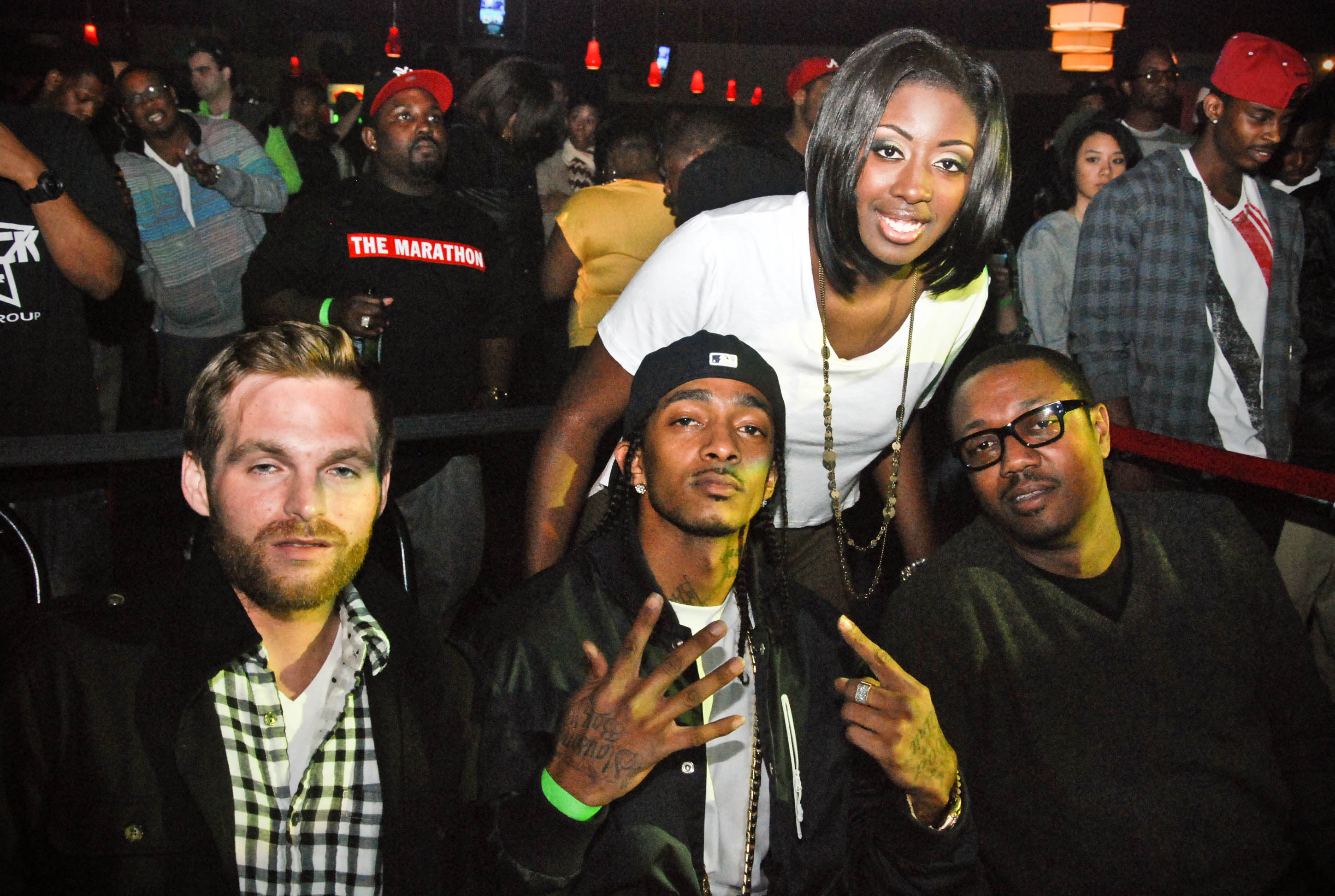
Judges Panel on March 26, 2011: Drew Money (left), Nipsey Hussle (center), Marc Byers (right), creator and founder Coko Korinne (top)

The events are judged by an industry panel (usually one established producer, one established artist and one music executive) who offer feedback on creativity, difficulty, and arrangement in the form of score sheets. The score sheets are only to grade the producer's individual beats but they may not be the deciding factor of who won the round. The ultimate decision comes from the consensus of the judge's panel. In case of a tie, the judges ask the producers to play one more beat. The judges also make the final decision on who should be picked as the "wild card". At the Grand Finale, the judges decide the overall winner.

Since 2010, the judge's panel has consisted of:

- Bryan-Michael Cox
- Boi-1da
- Nitti Beatz
- Kia Shine
- Michael McCary from Boyz II Men
- Young Yonny
- Nipsey Hussle
- Def Jam
- Tiffany J
- Universal Music Group
- Warner Music Group
- Atlantic Records
- BET
- Sony
- many others

Beyond the judges, the events are attended by rappers, singers, writers, producers, dancers, DJ's, and radio stations from across the United States.

=== Prizes ===
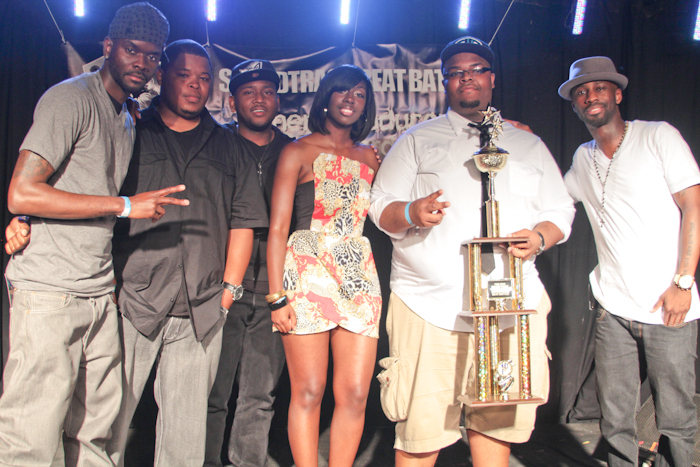
2010 Soundtrack Beat Battle Grand Prize Winner Mike Ewing (w/trophy)

In 2010, the Grand Prize winner was awarded a production kit worth $2500 from Big Fish Audio, a trip to Los Angeles for a pitch meeting with the VP of Urban A&R at Sony/ATV Music Publishing, and a free online music subscription. The first-place winner from each individual monthly battle was awarded a trophy, $500 worth of product from Big Fish Audio and a six-month subscription to MyHitOnline.com.

In 2011, the Grand Prize will be a feature in Electronic Musician, a pitch meeting with Sony/ATV in LA, a production kit worth $2500 from Big Fish Audio, $1000 in cash, and a recording session and music video with New York City rap artist MIMS. The song in the music video will then be sold on iTunes and sent to 50,000 DJs across the United States via Digiwaxx. First place winners for the monthly events included a production kit, trophy and $500.

=== Sponsors ===
Sponsors for the event in 2010 included MyHitOnline.com, Big Fish Audio, and Sony/ATV Music Publishing. Big Fish Audio and Sony/ATV continued to sponsor in 2011, along with Scion, SAE Institute, Electronic Musician, MIMS Open Bars, and DigiWaxx.

== Winners ==
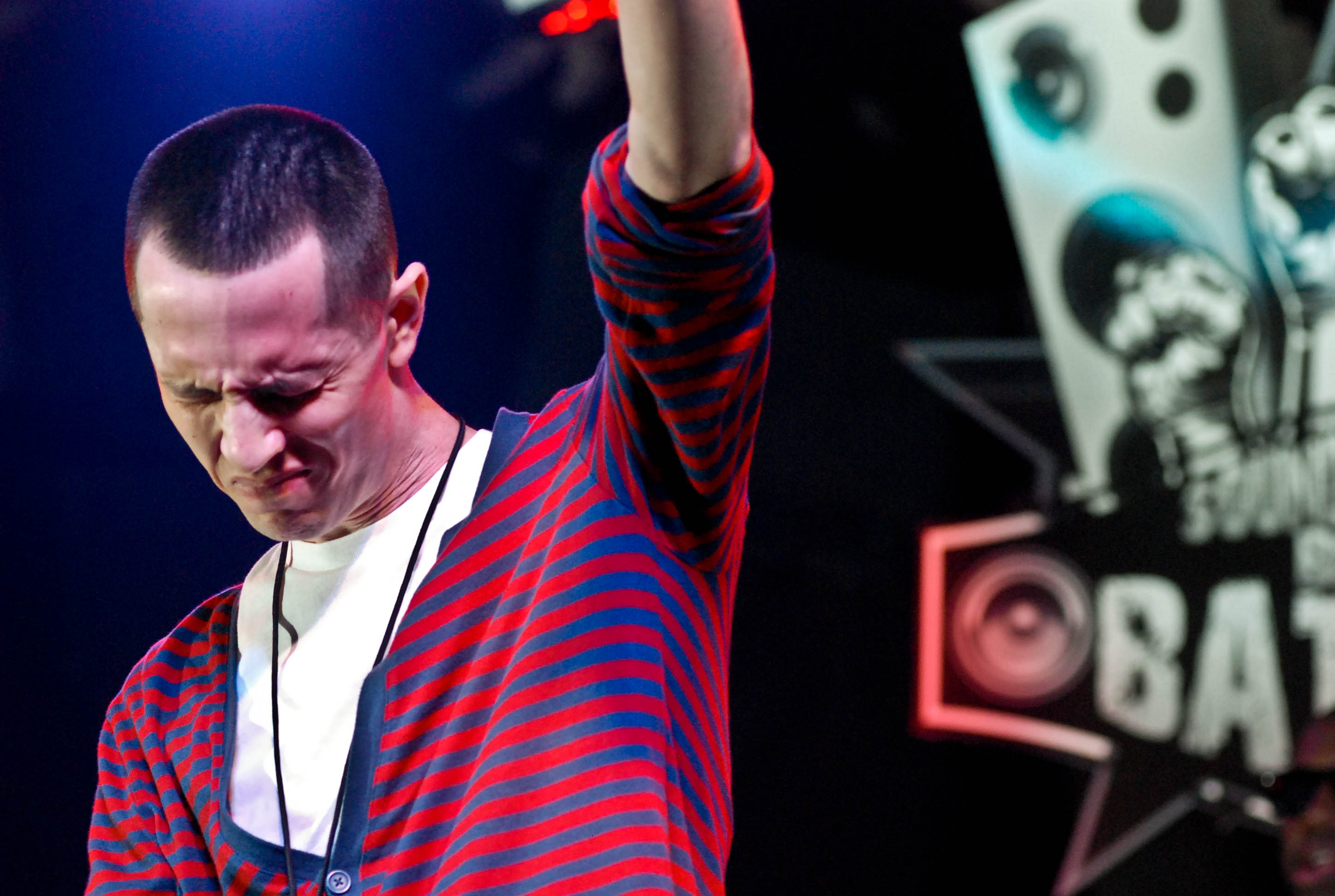
1st Place Winner Dirty Rice at Limelight on May 28, 2011

In 2010, the Grand Final runners-up were Nashville-based The F.A.N.S, composed of producer Ducko McFli and Syk Sense. The F.A.N.S. were signed by Boi-1da immediately after the competition. The overall winner was Mike Ewing. In 2010, winners of the different brackets included Dirty Rice, Michaelangelo, Chris King, Pro, Donovan's Beats, Mike Ewing, J-Mac, and The F.A.N.S.

As of May 2011, monthly winners include The F.A.N.S, 'KGonthaTrack, Mike Ewing, Yeyo Beatz, Dirty Rice and Chino Dollaz, Stadium Status, and J-Mac.
