= Doug Jung =

American screenwriter and film producer

Doug Jung is an American screenwriter and film producer. He is known for writing the screenplay for the 2016 film Star Trek Beyond.

== Filmography ==
Year	TV series/film	Producer	Writer	Actor	Notes
1999	So Weird	No	Yes	No	TV series, 1 episode
2000	The Huntress	No	Yes	No	TV series, 1 episode
2002	Breaking News	No	Yes	No	TV series, 2 episodes
2003	Confidence	No	Yes	No	
2007	Big Love: In the Beginning	Yes	No	No	TV series, 1 episode
2007	Big Love	Yes	Yes	No	TV series, 2 episodes
2009–10	Dark Blue	Executive	Yes	No	TV series, also developer
2014	Banshee	Consulting	Yes	No	TV series, 2 episodes
2016	Star Trek Beyond	No	Yes	Yes	
2018	The Cloverfield Paradox	No	Yes	No	
2019	Mindhunter	No	Yes	No	TV series, 2 episodes (story only)
2025	Chief of War	Executive	Yes	No	TV series, 7 episodes, also Showrunner
TBA	Mass Effect	Executive	Yes	No	TV series, also Showrunner
