= Nothing Is Promised =

Single by Mike Will Made It and Rihanna

from the album Ransom 2
- Released: June 3, 2016
- Recorded: November 2014
- Studio: South Beach Studios (Miami, FL); Westlake Recording Studios (Los Angeles, CA)
- Genre: Hip hop; trap
- Length: 2:50
- Label: Westbury Road; Interscope
- Songwriters: Michael Williams II; Asheton Hogan; Nayvadius Wilburn; Robyn Fenty
- Producers: Mike Will Made It; Pluss

Mike Will Made It singles chronology
"Choppin' Blades" (2015)	"Nothing Is Promised" (2016)	"It Takes Two" (2017)

Rihanna singles chronology
"This Is What You Came For" (2016)	"Nothing Is Promised" (2016)	"Sledgehammer" (2016)

"Nothing Is Promised" is a song recorded by American producer Mike Will Made It and Barbadian recording artist Rihanna. It was released on June 3, 2016 to digital outlets as the lead single from Mike Will's album, Ransom 2. Billboard described the track as "trap leaning".

== Background ==
In November 2014, Rihanna released a snippet of a song via her official Instagram account, the song featured lyrics such as "Ain't none of this shit promised, ain't none of this promised" and "Ain't none of this shit certain, ain't none of it certain", whilst the rest of the snippet featured "plinky synths and booming bass providing the only instrumentation." Following the release many assumed that it was a song for Rihanna's then-upcoming eighth studio album Anti (2016). In July 2015, Mike Will Made It posted a 15-second video clip featuring a snippet of Rihanna singing; in June of the following year he released their collaboration as the lead single from his album.

== Track listing ==
Digital download – explicit version
No.	Title	Length
1.	"Nothing Is Promised" (explicit)	2:50

Digital download – clean version
No.	Title	Length
1.	"Nothing Is Promised" (clean)	2:50

== Charts ==
Chart (2016)	Peak position
Australia (ARIA)	69
France (SNEP)	25
New Zealand Heatseekers (Recorded Music NZ)	7
Spain (Promusicae)	32
UK Singles (Official Charts)	64
US Billboard Hot 100	75
US Hot R&B/Hip-Hop Songs (Billboard)	26

== Certifications ==
Region	Certification	Certified units/sales
United States (RIAA)	Gold	500,000^{‡}
^{‡} Sales+streaming figures based on certification alone.
