= Gucci on My =

2017 single by Mike Will Made It featuring 21 Savage, YG and Migos

Single by Mike Will Made It featuring 21 Savage, YG and Migos

from the album Ransom 2
- Released: March 2, 2017
- Genre: Hip hop; trap
- Length: 4:34
- Label: Ear Drummer; Interscope
- Songwriters: Michael Williams II; Shayaa Abraham-Joseph; Keenon Jackson; Quavious Marshall; Kirsnick Ball; Kiari Cephus; Braylin Bowman
- Producers: Mike Will Made It; Resource

Mike Will Made It singles chronology
"It Takes Two" (2017)	"Gucci on My" (2017)	"Perfect Pint" (2017)

21 Savage singles chronology
"Rapper Hoes" (2017)	"Gucci on My" (2017)	"Bank Account" (2017)

YG singles chronology
"Childish" (2017)	"Gucci on My" (2017)	"Want Her" (2017)

Migos singles chronology
"Slide" (2017)	"Gucci on My" (2017)	"Peek a Boo" (2017)

Music video
- "Gucci on My" on YouTube

"Gucci on My" is a song by American record producer Mike Will Made It featuring American rappers 21 Savage and YG and American hip hop group Migos. It was released on March 2, 2017 as the second single from the Mike Will Made It's debut studio album Ransom 2 (2017).

== Background ==
On January 30, 2017, Mike Will Made It previewed the song in a video on Instagram.

== Composition ==
The song contains a sparse beat and opens with 21 Savage performing the chorus and first verse. YG performs the second verse, in which rapper Kamaiyah provides uncredited vocals, while the following verses are performed by Migos members Quavo, Takeoff and Offset. The lyrics find the rappers boasting their rich lifestyles. Quavo also praises having Jewish lawyers.

== Critical reception ==
Michelle Geslani of Consequence of Sound gave a positive review of the song, writing "it's a rumbling and ominous cut that's worthy of multiple plays. Make sure you do Mike Will justice and blast this on speakers that can handle his bass."

== Music video ==
The music video was directed by Motion Family and released on March 9, 2017. It sees the artists donning Gucci outfits and living luxuriously in a mansion, which is filled with gold, vintage furniture, and candles. They are surrounded by many beautiful women, count their money (which is shown as stacks of cash), show off their jewelry, and drink champagne.

== Charts ==
Chart (2017)	Peak position
US Bubbling Under Hot 100 (Billboard)	10
US Hot R&B/Hip-Hop Songs (Billboard)	41

== Certifications ==
Region	Certification	Certified units/sales
United States (RIAA)	Platinum	1,000,000^{‡}
^{‡} Sales+streaming figures based on certification alone.
