= Ducko McFli =

American rapper

- Born: Charles Singleton; Nashville, Tennessee, U.S.
- Genres: Hip hop; trap; R&B
- Occupations: Producer; DJ; songwriter; rapper
- Years active: 2010–present
- Labels: Same Plate; Sony; EarDrummers

Charles Singleton, known by his stage name Ducko McFli, is an American record producer, DJ, and songwriter based in Atlanta, Georgia. He initially gained recognition in 2014 for his production work on Drake's "Draft Day". He has since gone on to produce tracks for numerous notable artists including Lil Yachty, 2 Chainz, Khalid, and Joey Purp, among others. He is currently signed to Same Plate Entertainment, a joint venture label with Sony Music, and he was also a member of Mike WiLL Made-It's Ear Drummers label.

== Early life ==
Charles Singleton was born and raised in Nashville, Tennessee. He began participating in informal rap battles while in high school. This led to him rapping over tracks and eventually producing his own beats. In 2010, he began using the Ducko McFli stage name and partnered with fellow Nashville producer Syk Sense to compete in local beat battles. The two competed and placed second in the Soundtrack Beat Battle that year. This led to them forming a working relationship with notable producer, Boi-1da, who was one of the judges of the competition.

== Career ==
=== 2011–2013: Early rap mixtapes and production work ===
In 2011, Ducko McFli released the mixtape, King Duck, on which McFli himself was the featured rapper. He also released numerous collaborations with artists as a producer including, Molotov (with OpenMic) N.O.B.O.T.S. (with Chancellor Warhol), and Chicago: Lake Shore Drive (with MC Drupy Fli). In 2012, he traveled on Drake's Club Paradise Tour, serving in a behind-the-scenes role as French Montana's photographer and videographer. After returning to Nashville from the tour, McFli released another album entitled The Return of the Real.

In November 2012, he released a collaboration with Dee Goodz called "We Wit It". In January 2013, McFli released the track "N.I.Y.S." featuring Trinidad James. The following month, the music video for his song, "Cruising", was premiered on Vibe. That song would also reach number 3 on Hype Machine. Both songs were featured on McFli's project, Racthet Life, Sophisticated Dreams. In June 2013, he released another project in the EP, SykDuck, which was produced entirely by Syk Sense.

=== 2013–2016: Move to Atlanta, "Draft Day", and increased production ===
In late 2013, McFli opted to leave Nashville and move to Atlanta where he planned to focus more on producing songs. He spent six months in the city before landing a production placement on Drake's "Draft Day" alongside Syk Sense. The song sampled Lauryn Hill's "Doo Wop (That Thing)". He also began producing tracks as part of a collective known as "The Fam" consisting of himself, Syk Sense, and Atlanta producer, DJ FU. Additionally, McFli was signed to Mike WiLL Made-It's Ear Drummers record label in 2014. Because of his increased profile, McFli began earning further placements with artists like Fredo Santana ("Stay Da Same" featuring Lil Reese), ASAP Ferg ("This Side" featuring YG), OG Maco ("Fuckemx3" featuring Migos), and Audio Push ("Heavy" featuring OG Maco). Complex also listed McFli as one of "10 producers to watch for in 2015".

That year, he continued producing tracks, including those for acts like EarthGang ("Momma Told Me") and Mike Floss ("Dopeboy Dreaming"). In February 2015, he released the track "I'm Serious" featuring Problem, Snootie Wild, and Reese. He followed that with the release of a collaborative EP, Dreams, with Jace of Two-9. He also released a mixtape called Lowlife in August 2015 with guest appearances from Jace, OG Maco, Audio Push, Problem, and others. In 2016, he continued earning prominent placements including those with Lil Yachty ("Not My Bro"), Joey Purp ("Money & Bitches" featuring Mick Jenkins), and Khalid ("Reasons"). He also released another EP in November 2016 called The Lost Beauxs.

=== 2017–present: Further production work and signing to Same Plate ===
In 2017, McFli produced two tracks ("Saturday Night" and "Poor Fool" featuring Swae Lee) off of the 2 Chainz mixtape Pretty Girls Like Trap Music and one ("Big God") off of Mike WiLL Made-It's Ransom 2 project. In April of that year, he released a remix that combined 21 Savage's "No Heart" and Kanye West's "Heartless". That same month, he released a second collaborative EP with Jace entitled Dreams 2. In June 2018, it was announced that McFli was among the inaugural roster of Same Plate Entertainment, a joint venture label with Sony Music. That year, he produced several songs including Skooly's "Dope Fiend" and Mike Floss's "Background Check".

In January 2019, he was among over 100 invitees to join J.Cole for his Revenge of the Dreamers III recording sessions.

== Discography ==
=== Mixtapes ===
List of mixtapes with selected details
Title	Details
King Duck	Released: November 21, 2011; Label: Self-released; Formats: Digital download
The Return of the Real	Released: July 5, 2012; Label: Self-released; Formats: Digital download
Ratchet Life, Sophisticated Dreams	Released: February 2013; Label: Self-released; Formats: Digital download
Lowlife	Released: August 26, 2015; Label: Ear Drummers; Formats: Digital download

=== EPs ===
List of EPs with selected details
Title	Details
SykDuck	Released: June 7, 2013; Label: Self-released; Formats: Digital download
Dreams (with Jace)	Released: March 27, 2015; Label: Ear Drummers; Formats: Digital download
The Lost Beauxs	Released: November 19, 2016; Label: Ear Drummers; Formats: Digital download
Dreams 2 (with Jace)	Released: April 21, 2017; Label: Ear Drummers; Formats: Digital download

=== Singles ===
List of singles with selected details
Title	Year	Album
"N.I.Y.S." (feat. Trinidad James)	2013	Ratchet Life, Sophisticated Dreams
"Cruising"	2013	Ratchet Life, Sophisticated Dreams
"Trill$hit" (feat. Key! and Fortebowie)	2013	SykDuck
"I'm Serious" (feat. Problem, Snootie Wild, and Reese)	2015	Lowlife
"Take Yours" (with Mike Floss and Syk Sense)	2017	Non-album single
"I Told Y'all Niggas" (with Jace)	2017	Non-album single
"CheeseSteak" (feat. Key! and Jace)	2018	Non-album single

=== Songwriting and production ===
List of songwriting and production credits
Song	Year	Artist	Album	Role
"We Wit It"	2012	Dee Goodz	Non-album single	Co-producer
"Draft Day"	2014	Drake	Care Package	Co-producer
"Stay Da Same"	2014	Fredo Santana (featuring Lil Reese)	Walking Legend	Co-producer
"Riot"	2014	FatKidsBrotha	Non-album single	Producer
"I Arise Because"	2014	Danny Seth	Perception	Co-producer
"NothinLikeUs"	2014	Curtis Williams (feat. Key! and Danny Seth)	Danco James	Producer
"Space Danco"	2014	Curtis Williams (feat. Danny Seth, Jace, JID, and Lightskinmac11)	Danco James	Producer
"Fuckemx3"	2014	OG Maco (feat. Migos)	OG Maco	Producer, co-writer
"This Side"	2014	ASAP Ferg (feat. YG	Ferg Forever	Co-producer
"Heavy"	2014	Audio Push (feat. OG Maco)	Non-album single	Producer
"That Got Damn (Freestyle)"	2014	Mike WiLL Made-It (feat. Swae Lee, Jace, Andrea)	Ransom	Producer
"Hasta Lauego"	2014	Mike WiLL Made-It (feat. Rich Homie Quan)	Ransom	Producer
"Momma Told Me"	2015	EarthGang	Strays with Rabies	Producer
"Dopeboy Dreaming"	2015	Mike Floss	Don't Blame the Youth	Producer
"Reasons"	2016	Khalid	Non-album single	Producer
"Not My Bro"	2016	Lil Yachty	Lil Boat	Producer, co-writer
"Fucked Over"	2016	Lil Yachty	Lil Boat	Producer, co-writer
"Money & Bitches"	2016	Joey Purp (feat. Mick Jenkins)	iiiDrops	Co-producer
"Black Iphone Flex"	2016	Trinidad James (feat. Moeazy)	Non-album single	Producer
"Poor Fool"	2017	2 Chainz (feat. Swae Lee)	Pretty Girls Like Trap Music	Co-producer, co-writer
"Saturday Night"	2017	2 Chainz	Pretty Girls Like Trap Music	Co-producer, co-writer
"Big God"	2017	Mike WiLL Made-It (feat. Problem and Trouble)	Ransom 2	Co-producer, co-writer
"Roger & Zapp"	2017	Brian Brown	Non-album single	Producer
"Fucc It Up Suh"	2017	Skooly	BAcCWArdFeELiNgS	Producer
"Dope Fiend"	2018	Skooly	Don't You Ever Forget Me 3	Producer
