= Dark Blue (TV series) =

American crime drama television series

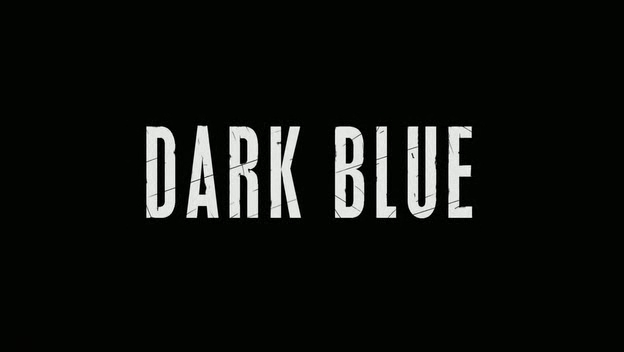
- Genre: Crime drama; Action
- Created by: Danny Cannon; Doug Jung
- Starring: Dylan McDermott; Omari Hardwick; Logan Marshall-Green; Nicki Aycox; Tricia Helfer
- Composers: David E. Russo; Graeme Revell
- Country of origin: United States
- Original language: English
- No. of seasons: 2
- No. of episodes: 20

Production
- Executive producers: Jerry Bruckheimer; Doug Jung; Danny Cannon; Jonathan Littman; Rick Eid; KirstieAnne Reed
- Producers: Randy Sutter; Kelly Van Horn; Dylan McDermott; Sam Humphrey; Eileen Myers
- Production location: Los Angeles
- Running time: 43 minutes
- Production companies: Jerry Bruckheimer Television; Warner Horizon Television

Original release
- Network: TNT
- Release: July 15, 2009 – September 15, 2010

Dark Blue is an American crime drama television series created by Danny Cannon and Doug Jung that premiered on TNT on July 15, 2009 and ended its run on September 15, 2010. The series is set in Los Angeles and revolves around Carter Shaw (Dylan McDermott), the leader of an undercover unit. Shaw is an officer who has dedicated his life to taking down the worst criminals in L.A., and this dedication has cost him his marriage. His team includes Ty Curtis, a newlywed who struggles between his job and his new life; Dean Bendis, an officer who is so deep in his undercover role that his team is no longer sure which side he is on; and Jaimie Allen, a green patrol cop recruited into the undercover unit because of her dark past and criminal skills. On November 16, 2010, TNT cancelled Dark Blue after two seasons.

== Premise ==
Carter Shaw is the head of a crack undercover team of the Los Angeles Police Department that is so secret, many of the team members' own colleagues do not know they are involved. Heir to several generations of police officers and a graduate of UCLA, Shaw quickly rose through the ranks of the LAPD. He made a large number of arrests of high-profile criminals during his eighteen years on the force. Shaw frequently uses criminal contacts to further leads and add substance to his team's covers during investigations; Carter's team members are often shocked at how friendly and casual he seems with known criminals.

Carter was married with one child before he became a deep undercover officer. His ex-wife claims his double life was the reason their marriage dissolved. This earlier part of his life is sharply contrasted with the one he now leads, in which he has few personal relationships.

His team includes a recently married cop (played by Omari Hardwick from TNT's Saved) who struggles with personal relationships he developed while undercover; a shoot-from-the-hip officer (played by Logan Marshall-Green) whose activities make fellow team members wonder if he has gone over to the other side; and a callow patrolwoman (played by Nicki Aycox) brought in because of her excellent skill in lying and her shady past.

== Production ==
Dark Blue comes to TNT from Warner Horizon Television, with prolific producer Jerry Bruckheimer who produced CSI and its spin-offs, as well as Cold Case and Without a Trace; Jonathan Littman, Danny Cannon, and Doug Jung serving as executive producers. KristieAnne Reed is co-executive producer. Cannon directed the pilot episode, which attracted 3.5 million viewers. The season finale was watched by 1.61 million viewers, a series low. The first season average was 2.589 million viewers. It was cancelled by TNT on November 16, 2010.

== Cast ==
- Dylan McDermott as Lt. Carter Shaw
- Omari Hardwick as Ty Curtis
- Logan Marshall-Green as Dean Bendis
- Nicki Aycox as Jaimie Allen
- Tricia Helfer as FBI Special Agent Alex Rice (season 2)

== Episodes ==
=== Series overview ===
Season	Episodes	Originally released	
Season	Episodes	First released	Last released
1	10	July 15, 2009	September 16, 2009
2	10	August 4, 2010	September 15, 2010

=== Season 1 (2009) ===
No. overall	No. in season	Title	Directed by	Written by	Original release date	US viewers (millions)
1	1	"Pilot"	Danny Cannon	Story by : Danny Cannon and Doug Jung; Teleplay by : Doug Jung	July 15, 2009	3.54
Guest star: James Russo
2	2	"Guns, Strippers, and Wives"	Danny Cannon	Rick Eid	July 22, 2009	2.89
Ty goes undercover to search for a gun trafficker, but nearly blows his cover by breaking a crucial rule and seeing his wife on her birthday. Team leader Carter must come up with $100,000 in less than 12 hours to keep Ty's mission protected...and to save his life. Guest star: Gregg Henry
3	3	"Purity"	Jeffrey Hunt	Doug Jung	July 29, 2009	2.92
A ruthless drug trafficker with a background as a lawyer proves a difficult target for the team, especially when the sting operation’s deadline gets pushed up. Jaimie is on the front lines of this case, which may be her hardest challenge yet. Guest star: Al Sapienza
4	4	"K-Town"	Nathan Hope	Eileen Myers	August 5, 2009	2.88
Guest star: Byron Chung
5	5	"August"	Karen Gaviola	Matt McGuinness	August 12, 2009	2.57
Guest stars: Hassan Johnson and Gbenga Akinnagbe
6	6	"Ice"	Danny Cannon	Rick Eid	August 19, 2009	2.57
Guest star: Daniel Roebuck
7	7	"O.I.S."	Jeffrey Hunt	Doug Jung	August 26, 2009	2.59
Carter tries to bust a dirty cop. Ty gets transferred to the cop's unit. Meanwhile, because of Carter's actions during the case, Jaimie digs up information that links Carter to the case personally. Guest star: Michael Biehn
8	8	"Venice Kings"	Eagle Egilsson	Nicholas Wootton	September 2, 2009	2.34
Guest star: Shawn Doyle
9	9	"Betsy"	Dermott Downs	Matt McGuinness & Eileen Myers	September 9, 2009	2.02
The team goes undercover to bust the biggest dealer on the west coast. To get dark, Jaimie has to use her real-life alias, Jaimie Anderson, and connect with an old friend. Also, she has to ask her boyfriend, a District Attorney, a favor to get what the team needs in order to complete the bust. Guest star: Channon Roe
10	10	"A Shot in the Dark"	Nick Gomez	Doug Jung & Rick Eid	September 16, 2009	1.61
Guest stars: Sasha Alexander and Andrea Roth

=== Season 2 (2010) ===
No. overall	No. in season	Title	Directed by	Written by	Original release date	US viewers (millions)
11	1	"Urban Garden" "Jardines urbanos"	Jeffrey Hunt	Rick Eid & Doug Jung	August 4, 2010	2.56
Guest star: Jordana Brewster
12	2	"Liar's Poker" "Poker mentiroso"	Dermott Downs	Gavin Harris	August 4, 2010	2.48
Carter and Ty team up to go after a local drug ring. Dean gets close to an art dealer (Jordana Brewster) whose father may be involved in drug distribution. After bringing down the main supplier, Carter and Agent Rice find out he has ties to a Mexican drug cartel. Guest star: Jordana Brewster and Tucker Albrizzi
13	3	"Shelter of the Beast"	John Behring	Sam Humphrey	August 11, 2010	2.34
Carter goes undercover as a porn king looking to diversify into the illegal drug business. The target of the sting is the head of a Mexican drug cartel. Dean's increasingly personal relationship with the daughter of a local drug dealer puts the undercover operation at risk. Guest star: Jordana Brewster
14	4	"High Rollers"	Karen Gaviola	Rick Eid	August 18, 2010	2.43
When the team infiltrates a local casino to investigate the disappearance and presumed murder of a law-school student with a gambling problem, the case has a negative effect on Ty who runs with his high-rolling cover a little too far. Meanwhile, Alex gives Jaimie a hard time over the risks she is willing to take with their target, a no-excuses loan shark (Max Martini).
15	5	"Brother's Keeper"	Nathan Hope	Doug Jung	August 25, 2010	2.59
16	6	"Jane Wayne"	Guy Ferland	Joe Halpin	September 1, 2010	2.06
17	7	"Home Sweet Home"	Danny Cannon	Gavin Harris	September 8, 2010	2.27
18	8	"Shell Game"	Eagle Egilsson	Rick Eid	September 8, 2010	1.97
19	9	"Dead Flowers"	Jeffrey Hunt	Rick Eid & Sam Humphrey	September 15, 2010	1.95
20	10	"Personal Effects"	Danny Cannon	Doug Jung	September 15, 2010	1.82

== Home release ==
On July 6, 2011, Warner Bros. released Dark Blue: The Complete First Season on DVD in region 1 via their Warner Archive Collection. This is a Manufacture-on-Demand (MOD) release, available exclusively through Warner's online store and only in the United States. The second and final season was released on May 8, 2012, once again an MOD release available via Warner Archive.

Name	Region 1	Discs
Dark Blue: The Complete First Season	July 6, 2010	4
Dark Blue: The Complete Second Season	May 8, 2012	3

== Music ==
Composer Graeme Revell, who frequently composes music on CSI: Miami and Eleventh Hour, along with David Russo III, who also composed Eleventh Hour.

== Reception ==
Since the premiere, the series has gained mixed reviews. Verne Gay of Newsday praised the series, saying "This is a solid and particularly well-produced cop show—and should be, with Jerry Bruckheimer topping the credits—although we take off points for extreme violence..."; he gave the show 83 out of 100. The Philadelphia Inquirer's Jonathan Storm gave it 70 out of 100, saying "If you're looking for unencumbered tough-guy entertainment, you won't be disappointed." Mary McNamara at the Los Angeles Times also gave the series a 70, saying "It's going to take more than an unshaven cheek and a few hollow coughs to make the character real, but Dark Blue's great supporting cast and high production values may buy its star enough time to disappear as effectively into his role as his undercover team disappears into theirs." The Boston Globe, however, criticized the show, saying "The characters are not especially dimensional, and McDermott's flat edginess as Carter doesn't help. But what's worse about Dark Blue is the sloppy plotting."

== International broadcasting ==
Country	Broadcaster	Season Premiere	
Australia	GO!	1	August 25, 2010
Bulgaria	PRO.BG	1	
Brazil	Space	1	
Canada	Citytv	1	
Czech Republic	TV Fanda	1	
Denmark	Kanal 5	1	
Finland	Sub	1	April 7, 2011
Germany	Kabel 1	1	February 6, 2010
Greece	Nova Cinema	1,2	
Ireland	RTÉ Two	1	March 15, 2010
Malaysia	RTM TV2	1	January 5, 2011
Netherlands	Veronica	1	January 2012
Norway	Viasat 4	1	January 2010
Poland	AXN	1	October 7, 2009
South Africa	MNet Series	1	February 1, 2010
Serbia	TV Avala	1,2	March 20, 2011
Slovakia	TV Dajto	1	November 10, 2012
Turkey	CNBC-e	1	
United States	TNT	1	July 15, 2009
United States	TNT	2	August 4, 2010
United Kingdom	5 USA	2	April 27, 2011
