= Star Trek Beyond =

2016 film by Justin Lin

- Theatrical release poster
- Directed by: Justin Lin
- Written by: Simon Pegg; Doug Jung
- Based on: Star Trek by Gene Roddenberry
- Produced by: J. J. Abrams; Roberto Orci; Lindsey Weber; Justin Lin
- Starring: John Cho; Simon Pegg; Chris Pine; Zachary Quinto; Zoe Saldaña; Karl Urban; Anton Yelchin; Idris Elba
- Cinematography: Stephen F. Windon
- Edited by: Kelly Matsumoto; Dylan Highsmith; Greg D'Auria; Steven Sprung
- Music by: Michael Giacchino
- Production companies: Paramount Pictures; Skydance; Alibaba Pictures; Huahua Media; Bad Robot; Sneaky Shark Productions; Perfect Storm Entertainment
- Distributed by: Paramount Pictures
- Release dates: July 7, 2016 (Sydney); July 22, 2016 (United States)
- Running time: 122 minutes
- Countries: United States; China
- Language: English
- Budget: $185 million
- Box office: $343.5 million

Star Trek Beyond is a 2016 science fiction action film directed by Justin Lin, and written by Simon Pegg and Doug Jung. It is the 13th installment in the Star Trek franchise and the third installment in the reboot series, serving as the sequel to Star Trek (2009) and Star Trek Into Darkness (2013). Chris Pine and Zachary Quinto reprise their respective roles as Captain James T. Kirk and Commander Spock, with Pegg, Karl Urban, Zoe Saldaña, John Cho, and Anton Yelchin reprising their roles from the previous films. Idris Elba, Sofia Boutella, Joe Taslim, and Lydia Wilson also appear.

Principal photography began in Vancouver on June 25, 2015. Two weeks after its Sydney premiere, it was released in the United States on July 22, 2016, by Paramount Pictures. The film is dedicated to the memory of Yelchin and actor Leonard Nimoy, who both died before the film was released. The film grossed $343.5 million at the box office, and received positive reviews from critics. At the 89th Academy Awards, the film was nominated for Best Makeup and Hairstyling. A sequel entered development but was ultimately canceled.

== Plot ==
The Federation starship USS Enterprise arrives at Starbase Yorktown for resupply and shore leave for its crew. Struggling to find meaning in the third year of their five-year exploration, Captain James T. Kirk has applied for a promotion to vice admiral, while recommending Spock as his replacement. Meanwhile, Hikaru Sulu reunites with his husband and daughter, Montgomery Scott works to keep the ship operational, and Spock and Nyota Uhura have decided to take a break from their relationship. Soon, Spock receives word from New Vulcan that Ambassador Spock—Spock's alternate-universe counterpart (Note: Ambassador Spock, who was played by Leonard Nimoy, is the version of Spock from The Original Series, who was transported from the future during the events of Star Trek (2009).)—has died.

Enterprise is dispatched on a rescue mission after an escape pod drifts out of a nearby uncharted nebula. Its occupant, Kalara, claims that her ship is stranded on Altamid, a planet in the nebula. Upon arrival, a massive swarm of small unknown ships ambush and quickly overwhelm the Enterprise and begin to tear it apart. The swarm's leader, Krall, and his followers board the Enterprise, and capture and kill many crew members, in an attempt to capture the Abronath, a relic recovered during a recent mission. Kirk orders the crew to abandon ship, leaving the disintegrating Enterprise saucer section to crash land on the nearby planet Altamid.

On the planet, Krall captures Sulu, Uhura, and other survivors. Kirk and Pavel Chekov, accompanied by Kalara, locate the Enterprise's saucer section. Knowing that Kalara knew they would be attacked, Kirk tricks her into revealing herself as Krall's spy. She is killed when Kirk and Chekov escape Krall's soldiers and flip the Enterprise saucer, crushing her. Dr. Leonard McCoy and a wounded Spock search for other survivors elsewhere on the planet. Spock tells McCoy that he ended his relationship with Uhura and is leaving Starfleet to help the Vulcan survivors and continue the late Ambassador Spock's work. Jaylah, a scavenger who previously escaped Krall's encampment where her father was killed, rescues Scotty and takes him to her makeshift home, the grounded USS Franklin, an early Starfleet vessel reported missing over a century earlier. Scotty is reunited with Kirk, Chekov, McCoy, and Spock. Krall coerces the captive Enterprise crew to hand over the Abronath, then uses it to complete an ancient bioweapon. With the device complete, Krall intends to kill Yorktown's inhabitants, then use the base to attack the United Federation of Planets. Kirk and the others free the crew as Krall launches into space with the bioweapon, leading his drones to Yorktown.

The Enterprise survivors power up the Franklin and launch her in pursuit of Krall. Theorizing the swarm's system may be vulnerable to high frequencies such as VHF or radio; they jam and destroy the swarm by broadcasting the song "Sabotage" by the Beastie Boys (Note: Previously heard in Star Trek (2009).). Krall is chased by the Franklin through Yorktown. Uhura, Kirk, and Scotty discover from the Franklin's logs that Krall is Balthazar Edison, Franklin's former captain. A pre-Federation human soldier, Edison rejected the Federation's principles of unity and cooperation with former enemies like the Xindi and the Romulans. When he and his crew were stranded on Altamid by a wormhole, the survivors used the extinct natives' technology to prolong their lives at the cost of the others, and repurposed the ancient race's dormant mining drone workers into the swarm. Thinking the Federation had abandoned them, Edison planned to destroy the Federation and resume galactic conflict. Kirk pursues Edison into Yorktown's ventilation system, where Edison activates the bioweapon. Before it can spread, Kirk ejects it and Edison into space, where the weapon disintegrates Edison. Using a commandeered alien ship, Spock and McCoy save Kirk moments before he is also blown into space.

In the aftermath, Commodore Paris closes the files of Captain Edison and the USS Franklin crew. Though offered the promotion to vice admiral, Kirk decides to remain as a captain with his love of adventure restored; Spock, after receiving a photograph of Ambassador Spock's Enterprise crew, chooses to remain in Starfleet and renews his relationship with Uhura. On Kirk's recommendation, Jaylah is accepted into Starfleet Academy. As the crew celebrates Kirk's birthday, they watch the construction of their new ship, the USS Enterprise-A, and resume their mission.

== Cast ==
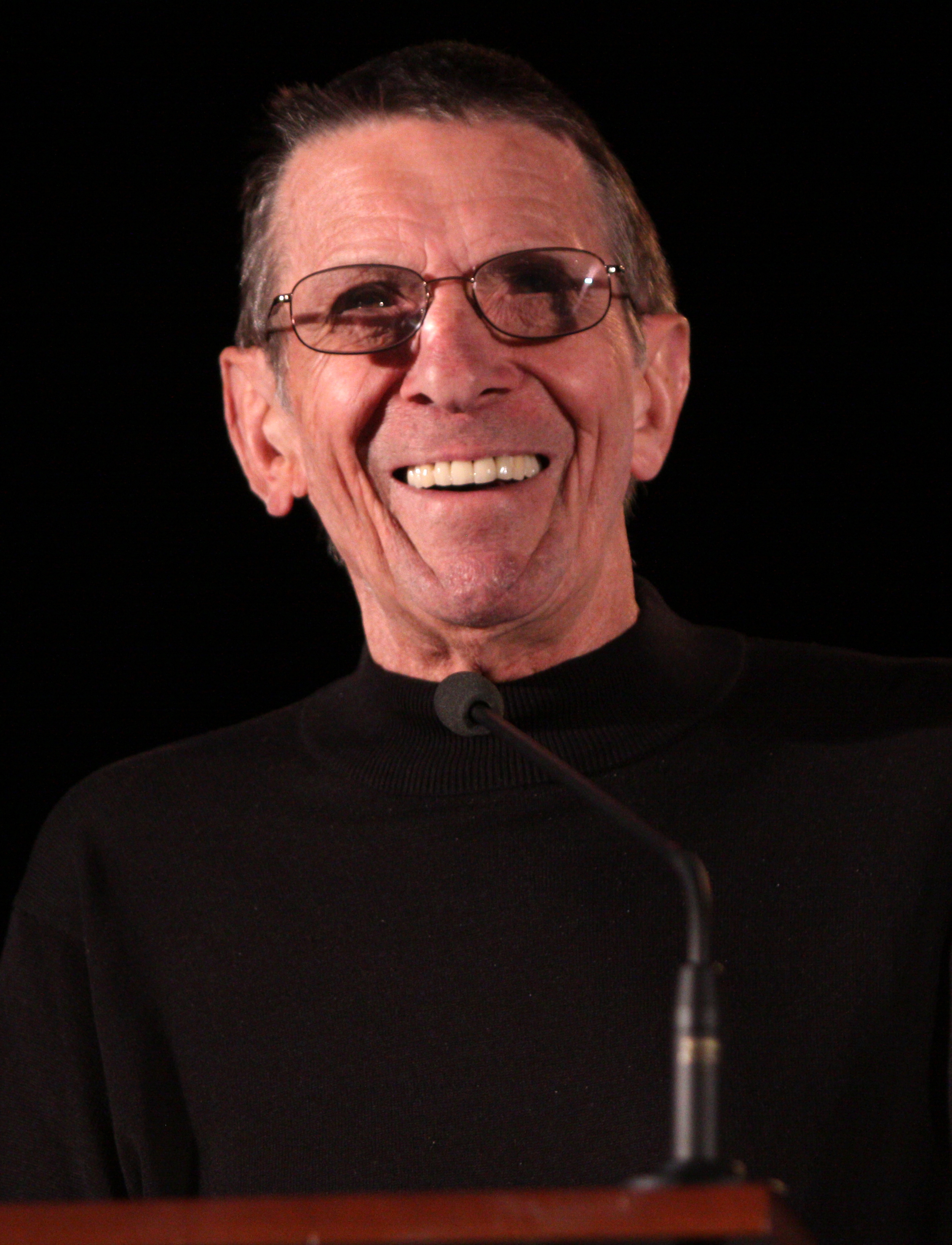
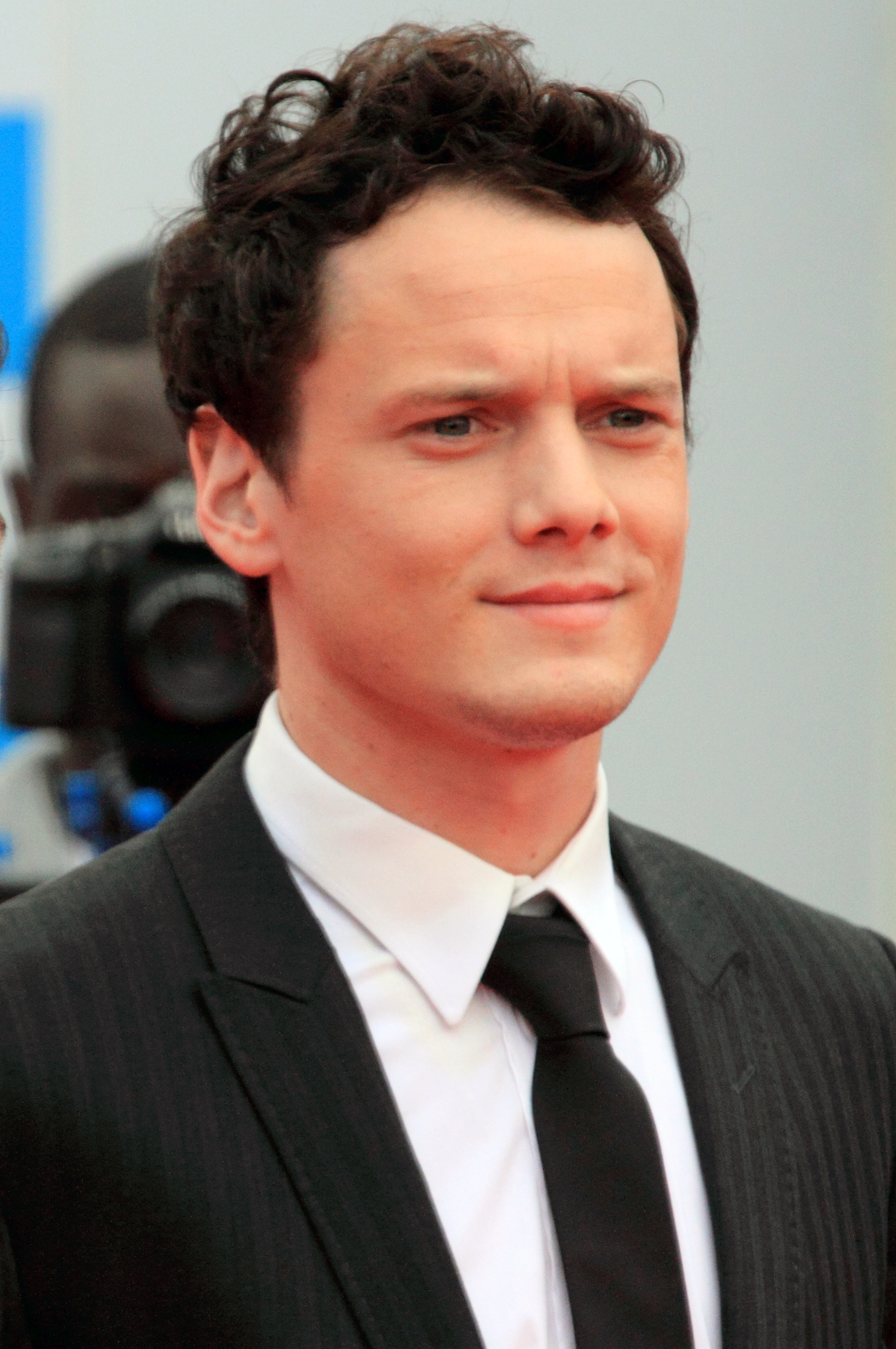
Leonard Nimoy (left) died a year before the film's release. The film pays tribute to him. Star Trek Beyond marked one of the final film performances of Anton Yelchin (right), who died in a car collision at his home on June 19, 2016, a month before the film's release.
- Chris Pine as Captain James T. Kirk, commanding officer of the USS Enterprise
- Zachary Quinto as Commander Spock, first officer and science officer
- Karl Urban as Lieutenant Commander Leonard "Bones" McCoy, chief medical officer
- Zoe Saldaña as Lieutenant Nyota Uhura, communications officer
- Simon Pegg as Lieutenant Commander Montgomery "Scotty" Scott, chief engineer
- John Cho as Lieutenant Hikaru Sulu, helmsman
- Anton Yelchin as Ensign Pavel Chekov, the ship's navigator and tactical expert. This was Yelchin's final performance as Chekov, as he died in a car accident on June 19, 2016, after filming his scenes.
- Idris Elba as Captain Balthazar M. Edison / Krall, former commander of the USS Franklin who became a powerful mutated alien creature
- Sofia Boutella as Jaylah, an alien scavenger.
- Joe Taslim as Anderson Le / Manas, Krall's henchman and former first officer who was also transformed.
- Lydia Wilson as Jessica Wolff / Kalara, Krall's henchwoman and former science officer who was also transformed.
  - Sara Maria Forsberg voices Kalara during the translation scenes
- Deep Roy as Keenser, Scotty's assistant
- Melissa Roxburgh as Ensign Syl
- Shohreh Aghdashloo as Commodore Paris, commanding officer of Starbase Yorktown
- Greg Grunberg as Commander Finnegan, Yorktown first officer
- Danny Pudi as Fi'Ja
- Kim Kold as Zavanko
- Anita Brown as Tyvanna
- Doug Jung as Ben
- Dan Payne as Wadjet
- Shea Whigham as Teenaxi Leader

Leonard Nimoy appears in a photo cameo appearance as Spock Prime, alongside George Takei, Walter Koenig, William Shatner, James Doohan, DeForest Kelley, and Nichelle Nichols as the Prime versions of Sulu, Chekov, Kirk, Scott, McCoy, and Uhura, respectively. Jeff Bezos cameos as an alien Starfleet official. Carlo Ancelotti has a brief cameo as a doctor at Starbase Yorktown.

== Production ==
=== Development ===
Having directed and produced Star Trek (2009) and Star Trek Into Darkness (2013), J.J. Abrams returned only as a producer so he could focus on directing Star Wars: The Force Awakens (2015), the first installment of the Star Wars sequel trilogy. Writer-producer Roberto Orci was announced as director in May 2014. He would have been making his directorial debut. However, in December, Orci's role was also listed as a producer only, with Edgar Wright considered to replace him as director, along with a short list of others, including Rupert Wyatt, Morten Tyldum, Daniel Espinosa, Justin Lin, and Duncan Jones. Also, Star Trek actor and director Jonathan Frakes expressed interest in the job. At the end of the month, Lin was announced as director of the third installment after declining an offer by Universal Studios to return to the Fast & Furious franchise as director of The Fate of the Furious (2017) after James Wan's departure from the project.

=== Screenplay ===
In 2013, Orci had begun writing the script with Patrick McKay and J. D. Payne, with Payne saying of the script in March, "We really want to get back to the sense of exploration and wonder. The kind of optimistic sense of the future that Star Trek has always kind of had at its core. It's the Chicago Bulls in space, in terms of these people who are all awesome at their job." In January 2015, after Orci's departure as director, Simon Pegg and Doug Jung were hired to rewrite the screenplay, with Pegg saying about the previous draft that Paramount "had a script for Star Trek that wasn't really working for them. I think the studio was worried that it might have been a little bit too Star Trek-y." Pegg had been asked to make the new film "more inclusive", stating that the solution was to "make a western or a thriller or a heist movie, then populate that with Star Trek characters so it's more inclusive to an audience that might be a little bit reticent." Pegg and Jung used Memory Alpha, a Star Trek fan wiki, as a resource in the writing of the film.

=== Casting ===
The first film's major cast members signed on for two sequels as part of their original deals. In 2014, early in the film's development, William Shatner said that he was contacted by producer Abrams to see if he would be interested in a possible role, but as the process continued and the script changed hands, the role never materialized. Alice Eve was not included in the film despite her character having joined the Enterprise crew at the end of the last installment, because Pegg, in writing the script, did not have anything meaningful for her to do; however, he stressed that Eve could appear in a later installment. Joseph Gatt's cyborg Science Officer 0718 was dropped from the film after a rewrite. In March 2015, Idris Elba was in early talks to play the villain, and he was confirmed for the role in the following months. Pegg noted that the villain would be an original one, rather than a known antagonist from past stories in the Star Trek franchise. In April, Sofia Boutella joined the cast in a lead role, and in early July, Deep Roy was confirmed to reprise his role of Keenser. That month, Joe Taslim was added to the cast opposite Elba's villain, and by August, Lydia Wilson joined as well. In March 2016, Shohreh Aghdashloo was cast as Commodore Paris for reshoots on the film.

=== Filming ===
Principal photography on the film began on June 25, 2015, in Vancouver, and Squamish, British Columbia (in the Stawamus Chief Provincial Park), after several delays caused by multiple script rejections. Additional filming locations were Seoul, South Korea, Dubai, United Arab Emirates, and the Nahanni National Park Reserve in Canada's Northwest Territories. Principal filming ended on October 15, 2015. In March 2016, production underwent reshoots, with Aghdashloo added to the cast.

=== Visual effects ===
The visual effects are provided by Atomic Fiction, DNEG and Kelvin Optical and supervised by Kevin Baillie, Ryan Tudhope, Pauline Duvall and Peter Chiang as the Production Supervisor with help from Rodeo FX.

== Music ==
In August 2015, composer Michael Giacchino confirmed that he would return to write the score. On June 26, 2016, singer Rihanna released a teaser across her social media accounts for a single for the film entitled "Sledgehammer", and the song premiered the following day. The Beastie Boys' "Sabotage" was used in the movie's trailer, as well as the final battle scene.

== Marketing ==
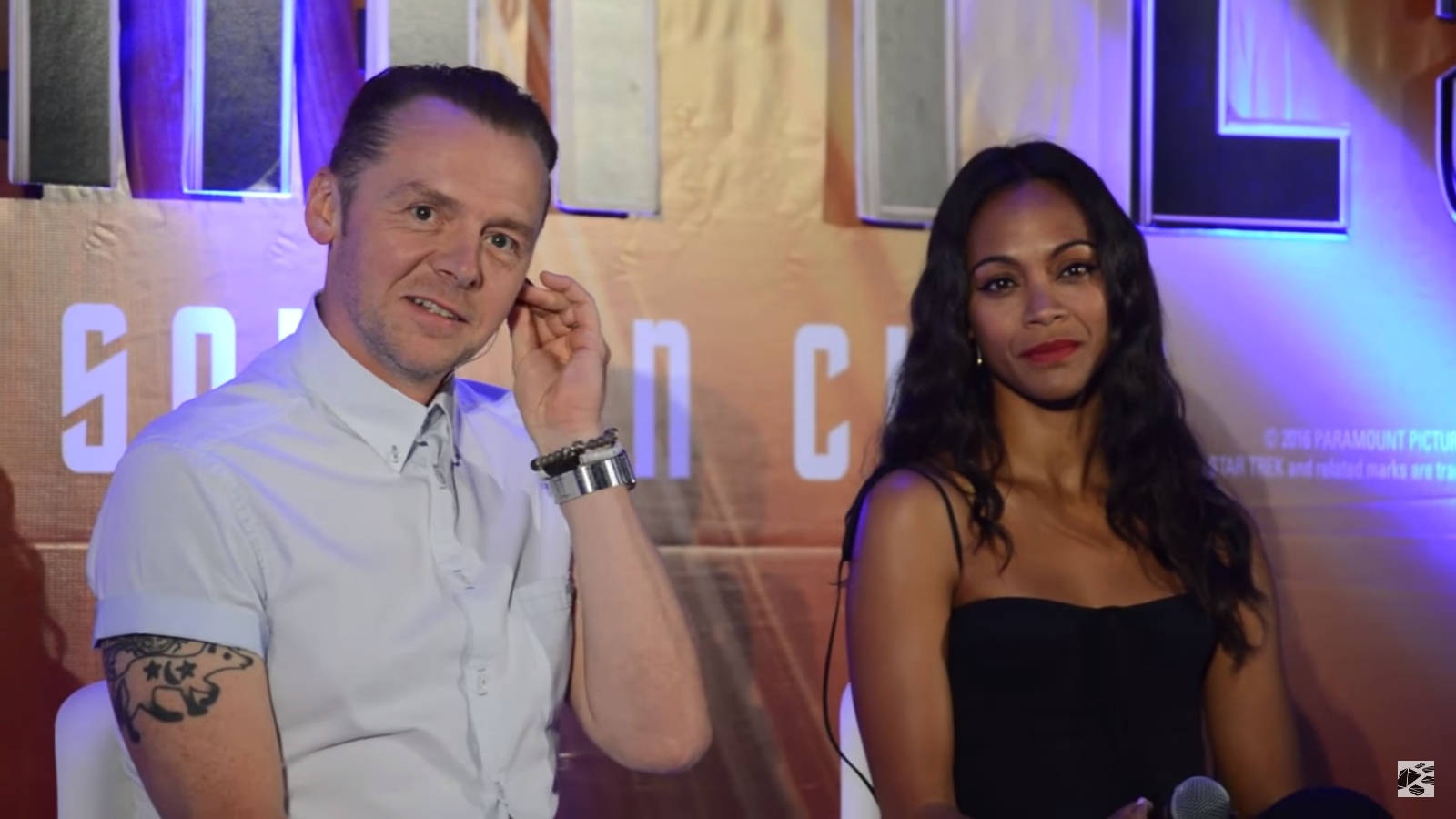
Simon Pegg and Zoe Saldaña at a press conference for Star Trek Beyond in Mexico

A teaser trailer for the film was released on December 14, 2015, and was criticized by some fans for focusing too much on action, and for featuring the Beastie Boys song "Sabotage", which many considered out of place, despite its use in the first film of the rebooted series. Pegg expressed similar thoughts of dissatisfaction with the teaser, saying that he "didn't love it" because "I know there's a lot more to the film." He interpreted the trailer to be a way of the marketing team saying, "Come and see this movie! It's full of action and fun!" A second trailer was released on May 20, 2016, to warmer reviews. A third and final trailer was released on June 27, 2016, featuring Rihanna's single "Sledgehammer".

== Release ==
=== Theatrical ===
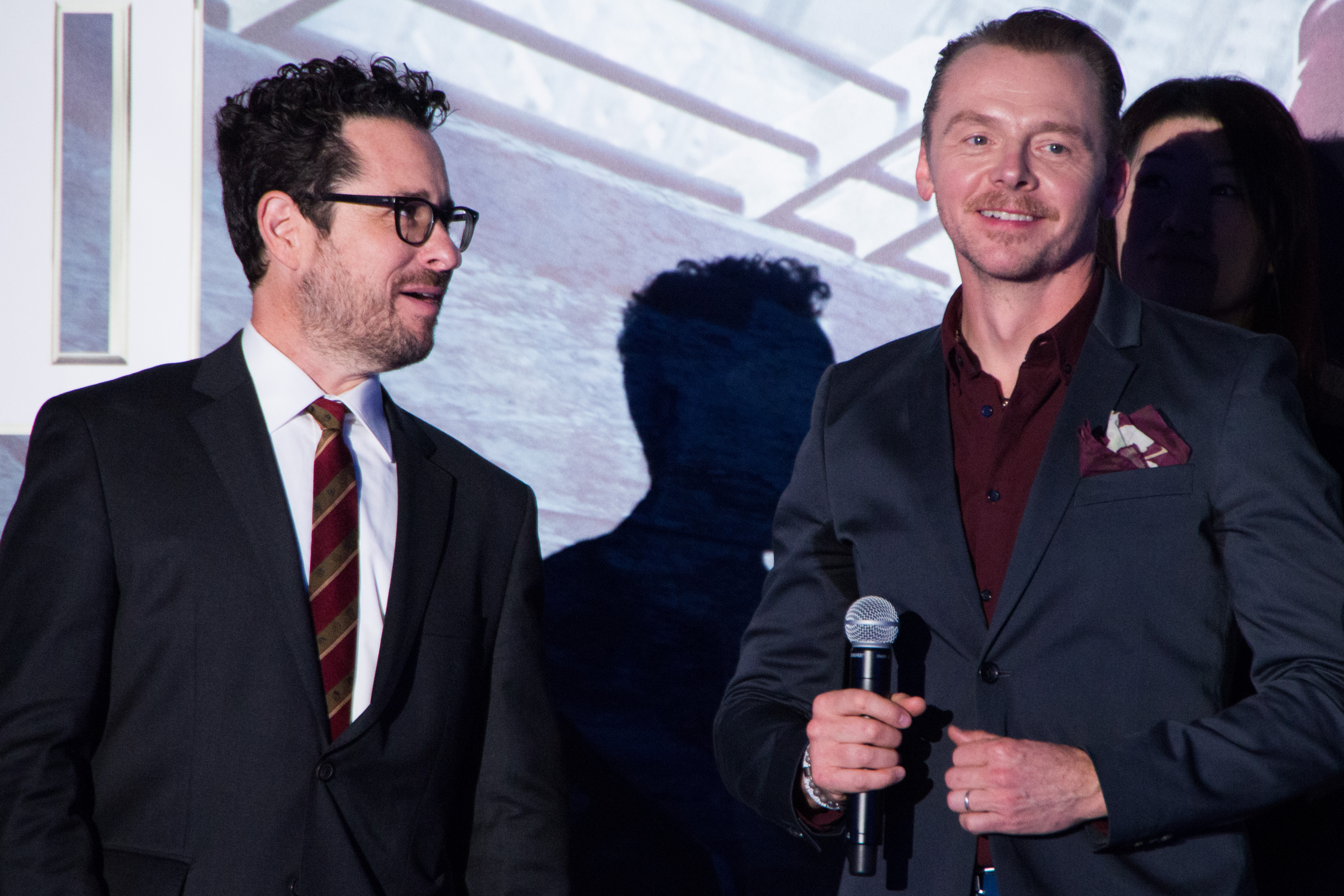
J. J. Abrams and Simon Pegg at the film's Japanese premiere in October 2016.

In August 2014, it was announced that Paramount had pushed back the release of the film to 2016, for the 50th anniversary celebration of the debut of Gene Roddenberry's original sci-fi series. In December, it was announced that the film was to be released on July 8, 2016. In September 2015, the film's release date was pushed back two weeks from its original release date of July 8, 2016, to July 22, 2016. The film was released in Dolby Cinema format in selected theaters. The film had its Australian premiere in Sydney on July 7.

=== Home media ===
Star Trek Beyond was released on Digital HD on October 4, 2016, and on Ultra HD Blu-ray, Blu-ray and DVD on November 1, 2016.

== Reception ==
=== Box office ===
Star Trek Beyond underperformed financially at the box office. Scott Mendelson of Forbes observed that one factor contributing to the film's underperformance was its untimely release in a crowded summer in which it was surrounded by other films like Ghostbusters, Jason Bourne and Suicide Squad. He also noted that had Paramount released the film for the Star Trek's 50th anniversary on September 8, the film could have benefited from that occasion, as demonstrated in October 2012 when MGM released the James Bond film Skyfall (which went on to gross over $1 billion) for that series' 50th anniversary.

Star Trek Beyond grossed $158.8 million in the United States and Canada and $184.6 million in other countries for a worldwide total of $343.5 million, against a production budget of $185 million. It had a global opening of $89.2 million and an IMAX opening of $11.6 million on 571 IMAX screens. Industry analyst Danny Cox had previously estimated that in order for the film to break even, it would have to earn $340–350 million worldwide, and ended losing an estimated $50.5 million.

==== North America ====
In the United States and Canada, the film was projected to gross $50–60 million from 3,928 theaters in its opening weekend. It opened alongside Ice Age: Collision Course and Lights Out, but critics noted that the film did not face any direct competition with them. It opened across 3,928 theaters, of which 391 were IMAX. It made $5.5 million from Thursday previews from 3,100 theaters, an improvement over its two immediate predecessors. Of that, the film grossed $1.1 million on 387 IMAX screens. This includes revenues generated from Wednesday night, when Paramount screened all Star Trek films, which concluded with a 10pm screening of Beyond. On its opening day, it earned $22.3 million, which is the second-biggest among the franchise, only behind Star Trek ($30.9 million), the third-biggest opening day of the summer for a live-action film and the second-biggest opening day of the year for a non-comic book superhero live-action film, behind only The Jungle Book. It earned $59.3 million in its opening weekend, which is the third-biggest debut among the franchise but the lowest of the reboot series (behind Star Trek and Star Trek Into Darkness for both). Adjusted for inflation, it ranks fourth behind the aforementioned films and Star Trek: First Contact ($60 million). It performed exceptionally well in IMAX making $8.7 million in 387 IMAX screens. The film came in 14% lower than the opening of its immediate predecessor, Star Trek Into Darkness, but box office experts noted that the fall was mild in comparison to other sequels of 2016 and is still considered a hit. It dropped precipitously by 69% on its second Friday and was overtaken by newcomer spy film Jason Bourne, earning $6.75 million. By comparison, Star Trek dropped 56% on its first Friday while Star Trek into Darkness fell 53%. However, this was not the worst Friday-to-Friday drop for a Star Trek film, as Star Trek: Nemesis plunged 83% on its second Friday due to negative word-of-mouth and heavy competition from The Lord of the Rings: The Two Towers.

By the second and third weekend following the film's release, box office revenue continued to drop significantly due to the release of competing films like Jason Bourne and Suicide Squad.

==== Outside North America ====
Internationally, the film received a scattered release pattern and was released across approximately 76 markets. It opened in 37 markets in conjunction with its North American release in its first weekend, including in the United Kingdom, Germany and Australia — territories where the franchise has traditionally performed well. It earned a total of $30 million from the said number of markets, which is slightly lower than Star Trek Into Darkness' $31.7 million international debut in 2013. Paramount said that the heatwave in Europe negatively impacted the weekend's results. Beyond debuted at first place in 16 of them and recorded the biggest opening weekend ever for the franchise in 17 markets, including Russia, Taiwan and Thailand. It debuted in third place overall at the international box office, behind Skiptrace and The Legend of Tarzan. Beyond set numerous records in IMAX theaters. Led by very strong results in the UK and Russia, it grossed an estimated weekend of $3.2 million on 184 screens, besting Star Trek Into Darkness' $2.8 million debut. In its second weekend, it fell drastically by 57% earning $13 million. As a result, it slipped into sixth place at the box office. After fluctuating up and down the charts, it finally topped the international box office in its seventh weekend due to a robust debut in China and remained at the top for the second weekend in a row.

The highest international tallies were recorded in the United Kingdom, Ireland and Malta ($6.1 million), South Korea ($5.6 million), Germany ($4.5 million), Russia and the CIS ($3.3 million), Australia ($3 million), France ($2.1 million), Mexico ($1.5 million), Brazil ($1.6 million), Venezuela ($1.4 million) and Taiwan ($1 million). In the United Kingdom, where the performance of the franchise has been consistently solid, it was edged out by the family film The BFG. Its £4.74 million ($6.2 million) opening from 535 theaters is the lowest among the rebooted series and a 31% decline from the £8.43 million ($11 million) opening posted by Star Trek Into Darkness, if previews are deducted. The Guardian cited J. J. Abrams's departure as the director and fans' unenthusiastic response to Idris Elba as the villain (in comparison to Benedict Cumberbatch in Star Trek Into Darkness) as some possible reasons why the film failed to generate lucrative revenue. The site also projected a total gross of around £20 million ($26 million+) for the film.

It opened in China on September 2 and earned an estimated $9.30 million on its opening day (representing 66% of the total marketplace), including $370,000 in midnight preview showings (160% larger than the opening day of Star Trek Into Darkness), and $21.8 million in two days. In total, it had an opening weekend of $31.3 million according to Paramount and $30.7 million according to Chinese box office service Ent Group from 6,259 screens, marking the biggest Star Trek debut in the country, 105% bigger than the opening of Star Trek Into Darkness. It was the only one of five new releases to make any impression on the chart. It remained at the top of the box office for a second weekend by adding another $10.1 million (according to Chinese data provider Ent Group), or $11.37 million (according to Paramount) from 5,830 locations from Friday to Sunday, a steep decline of 62.6% from its previous weekend. It fell out of the top 10 in its third weekend, and has grossed a total of $64.2 million there. It is projected the film will end its run there anywhere around $70–100 million, a disappointing figure considering the robust marketing effort by investors Alibaba Pictures and Huahua Media. Thus, the film is the second Paramount film to underperform in that corner following Teenage Mutant Ninja Turtles: Out of the Shadows in July.

In terms of total earnings, its biggest offshore markets are the United Kingdom ($13.3 million), Germany ($8.6 million), Russia and the CIS ($5.5 million) and Australia ($5.2 million). Star Trek Beyond opened in Japan on October 21, where it has earned $4.9 million as of 17 November 2016.

=== Critical response ===
On Rotten Tomatoes, the film has an approval rating of 86% based on 319 reviews, with an average rating of 7/10. The website's critical consensus reads, "Star Trek Beyond continues the franchise's post-reboot hot streak with an epic sci-fi adventure that honors the series' sci-fi roots without skimping on the blockbuster action." On Metacritic, the film has a weighted average score of 68 out of 100, based on 50 critics, indicating "generally favorable reviews". Audiences polled by CinemaScore gave the film an average grade of "A−" on an A+ to F scale, down from the first two films' "A".

Richard Roeper of the Chicago Sun-Times gave the film 3 stars out of 4 and said, "Even with its big-screen pyrotechnics and its feature-length running time, Star Trek Beyond plays like an extended version of one of the better episodes from the original series, and I mean that in the best possible way." Scott Collura of IGN awarded the film 8.4/10, describing it as being: "terrific, a fun and exciting entry in the series that balances subtle fan service while also feeling fresh and modern; Star Trek Beyond is the perfect way to celebrate the series' 50th anniversary." David Rooney of The Hollywood Reporter said the screenplay by Simon Pegg and Doug Jung "injects a welcome strain of humor that's true to the original Gene Roddenberry creation, delivering nostalgia without stiff veneration", and went on by saying, "While Beyond won't unseat 1982's thrilling The Wrath of Khan as the gold standard for Star Trek movies, it's a highly entertaining entry guaranteed to give the franchise continuing life." Owen Gleiberman of Variety, in an otherwise positive review, described the film being "a very familiar, old-fangled, no-mystery structure, and that's because it's basically the Star Trek version of an interplanetary action film, with a plot that doesn't take you to many new frontiers." Furthermore, he called Star Trek Beyond "a somewhat diverting place holder, but one hopes that the next Star Trek movie will have what it takes to boldly go where no Star Trek movie has gone before." Mark Hugues of Forbes said, "Star Trek Beyond is the third-best Star Trek film of all time, creating the sort of emotional connection and familiar, powerful characterizations we loved in the original series while delivering top-notch action and the best Star Trek movie villain since First Contact's Borg Queen."

The film was also met by critics who were less taken with the film. James Berardinelli of Reelviews gave 2½ stars out of 4, writing: "Star Trek Beyond is a Star Trek movie, although not an especially good one; The action sequences are frenetic, kinetic, and, at times, incoherent. This isn't unexpected; it's Lin's trademark. But the plot, credited to Simon Pegg & Doug Jung, is pure Trek. Unfortunately, it's also instantly forgettable." Dave Robinson of outlet Crash Landed writes that "Star Trek Beyond fails to push beyond its own roots and becomes just another very safe sci-fi popcorn movie in an increasingly crowded market, that will likely have you leaving the theatre feeling exactly as you entered." Chris Nashawaty of Entertainment Weekly gave the film a C+ and wrote, "[w]ith Beyond, it feels like just another summer tentpole with not enough going on underneath the tent."

George Takei, the actor who played Hikaru Sulu in The Original Series, criticised the decision by the writers to make the character gay. The actor said "I'm delighted that there's a gay character, unfortunately, it's a twisting of Star Trek creator Gene Roddenberry's creation, into which he put so much thought. I think it's really unfortunate." Takei claimed this would make Sulu appear to have been closeted, and he requested instead for a new character to be introduced. Simon Pegg responded by saying the move was intended as a tribute to George Takei's status as an LGBT activist.

=== Accolades ===
Accolades received by Star Trek Beyond
Award	Date of ceremony	Category	Recipient(s)	Result	Ref.
Academy Awards	February 26, 2017	Best Makeup and Hairstyling	Joel Harlow and Richard Alonzo	Nominated	
Critics Choice Awards	December 11, 2016	Best Sci-Fi/Horror Movie	Star Trek Beyond	Nominated	
Critics Choice Awards	December 11, 2016	Best Hair and Makeup	Star Trek Beyond	Nominated	
Empire Awards	March 19, 2017	Best Make-Up and Hairstyling	Star Trek Beyond	Nominated	
GLAAD Media Award	April 1, 2017	Outstanding Film – Wide Release	Star Trek Beyond	Nominated	
Golden Trailer Awards	May 4, 2016	Best Teaser	"Impossible"	Nominated	
Hollywood Music in Media Awards	November 17, 2016	Best Song – Sci-Fi/Fantasy Film	"Sledgehammer" – Sia Furler, Robyn Fenty and Jesse Shatkin	Nominated	
Jupiter Awards	March 29, 2017	Best International Actor	Chris Pine	Nominated	
Nickelodeon Kids' Choice Awards	March 11, 2017	Best Villain	Idris Elba	Nominated	
Nickelodeon Kids' Choice Awards	March 11, 2017	Favorite Butt-Kicker	Zoe Saldana	Nominated	
Nickelodeon Kids' Choice Awards	March 11, 2017	BFFs (Best Friends Forever)	Chris Pine and Zachary Quinto	Nominated	
Make-Up Artists and Hair Stylists Guild	February 19, 2017	Feature-Length Motion Picture – Special Make-Up Effects	Joel Harlow and Richard Alonzo	Won	
Saturn Awards	June 28, 2017	Best Science Fiction Film	Star Trek Beyond	Nominated	
Saturn Awards	June 28, 2017	Best Actor	Chris Pine	Nominated	
Saturn Awards	June 28, 2017	Best Supporting Actor	Zachary Quinto	Nominated	
Saturn Awards	June 28, 2017	Best Make-up	Joel Harlow and Monica Huppert	Won	
Teen Choice Awards	July 31, 2016	Choice AnTEENcipated Movie	Star Trek Beyond	Nominated	
Teen Choice Awards	July 31, 2016	Choice Movie Actor: AnTEENcipated	Chris Pine	Nominated	
Teen Choice Awards	July 31, 2016	Choice Movie Actress: AnTEENcipated	Zoe Saldana	Nominated	
Visual Effects Society	February 7, 2017	Outstanding Model in a Photoreal or Animated Project	Enterprise – Chris Elmer, Andreas Maaninka, Daniel Nicholson and Rhys Salcombe	Nominated	

== Canceled sequel ==
While promoting Beyond, Abrams revealed that a fourth film in the reboot series would see Chris Hemsworth reprising his role of George Kirk, father of Pine's James T. Kirk, from the prologue of the first reboot film. Paramount Pictures officially announced the fourth film in July 2016, with J. D. Payne and Patrick McKay set to write the screenplay. In December 2017, Quentin Tarantino approached Abrams and Paramount about an idea he had for a new Star Trek film, and a writers room was hired consisting of Mark L. Smith, Lindsey Beer, Drew Pearce, and Megan Amram. Smith was chosen to write the film's screenplay at the end of the month, based on Tarantino's idea. S. J. Clarkson entered talks to direct the Beyond sequel in April 2018, but contract negotiations with Pine and Hemsworth ended in August with the pair leaving the project. The film was cancelled by January 2019 and Clarkson moved on to other projects. In January 2020, Tarantino said he would not direct his proposed film.

Noah Hawley was hired to write and direct a new Star Trek film for Paramount in November 2019, based on his own vision for the franchise. This project was "very close" to production beginning in August 2020 when it was placed on hold by new Paramount Pictures president Emma Watts, whose top priority at the studio was to figure out the direction of the Star Trek franchise. Watts had several options, including Hawley's film, a new Beyond sequel attempt, and Tarantino's project with a new director. In March 2021, Paramount set Star Trek: Discovery writer Kalinda Vazquez to write a new Star Trek film based on her own original idea, while a separate script was developed by Beer and Geneva Robertson-Dworet. The studio scheduled the latter film for release on June 9, 2023, and hired Matt Shakman to direct it in July. Work was expected to move at "warp speed" ahead of a filming start in early-to-mid 2022, with Abrams producing. In November 2021, the film's release was pushed to December 22, 2023. The script was being re-written by Josh Friedman and Cameron Squires. Abrams and new Paramount Pictures CEO Brian Robbins announced in February 2022 that the main cast from the previous three Star Trek films would return, including Pine, Quinto, Pegg, Urban, Saldaña, and Cho. The announcement came as a surprise to the actors as negotiations had not yet begun for their return.

Shakman left the film in August 2022 after joining the Marvel Studios film The Fantastic Four: First Steps (2025), and it was removed from Paramount's release schedule soon after. In January 2024, the studio was revealed to be expanding its Star Trek film slate to have multiple films in development, inspired by the success of the multiple Star Trek series on the streaming service Paramount+. The in-development Star Trek 4 was described as the "final chapter" in the main film series at that time. Steve Yockey was writing a new draft of the script by the end of March 2024. Work on the film stalled amid the merger of Skydance Media and Paramount Global; Paramount Skydance canceled Star Trek 4 and hired Jonathan Goldstein and John Francis Daley in November 2025 to make a new film.

== See also ==
- List of films featuring space stations
