= Mike Will Made It =

American record producer, rapper and singer (born 1989)

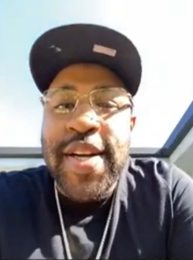
- Mike Will Made It in 2020

Background information
- Also known as: Mike Will Made-It; Mike Will
- Born: Michael Len Williams II; March 23, 1989 (age 37); Marietta, Georgia, U.S.
- Genres: Hip-hop; R&B; pop; trap
- Occupations: Record producer; songwriter; rapper; singer
- Years active: 2004–present
- Labels: Atlantic; EarDrummers; Interscope
- Website: mikewillmade.it

Michael Len Williams II (born March 23, 1989), known professionally as Mike Will Made It (often stylized as Mike WiLL Made-It) or simply Mike Will, is an American record producer, rapper and singer. He is best known for producing trap beats on several Southern hip-hop, contemporary R&B and pop singles. His credits include "Black Beatles" and "Powerglide" by Rae Sremmurd, "Mercy" by Kanye West, "No Lie" by 2 Chainz, "Bandz a Make Her Dance" by Juicy J, "Pour It Up" by Rihanna, "Love Me" by Lil Wayne, "Body Party" by Ciara, "We Can't Stop" by Miley Cyrus, "Formation" by Beyoncé, and "Humble" by Kendrick Lamar. He embarked on a career as a non-performing lead artist in 2013, signing with Interscope Records to release his debut single "23" (featuring Miley Cyrus, Wiz Khalifa and Juicy J), which peaked at number 11 on the Billboard Hot 100. His 2017 follow-up single, "Rake It Up" (with Yo Gotti featuring Nicki Minaj) peaked at number eight on the chart.

Prior to releasing "23", he self-released 5 mixtapes. His debut studio album, Ransom 2 (2017), peaked at number 27 on the Billboard 200. He also curated the accompanying soundtrack (2018) to the sports film Creed II, and signed with Giant Music to release his second album R3set (2026). As an imprint of Interscope, Williams founded the record label EarDrummer Records in 2013; the label has signed acts including the Mississippi-based hip-hop duo Rae Sremmurd and late Atlanta-based rapper Trouble.

== Early life ==
Williams was born in Marietta, Georgia, the youngest of three children; he has two older sisters. His father, Michael Williams Sr., is a former IBM executive who worked as a club DJ in the 1970s. His mother, Shirley Williams, a former bank loan officer, was once in a gospel group, singing for Dottie Peoples. He grew up in a musical family as his uncle was an accomplished guitar player and one of his older sisters was a drum major in the Olympics. While growing up, Williams was athletic, participating in many sports, including basketball, baseball, and football, with dreams of becoming a professional athlete.

His life also centered around a love of hip-hop music. Williams first developed his talent for music by re-playing popular instrumentals that he heard on the radio while he and his friends would freestyle to them. In several interviews, Williams has mentioned, in particular, re-playing the instrumental for "Still Fly", a popular song by the southern rap group Big Tymers, on a Casio brand keyboard, and has also mentioned re-playing "Young'n (Holla Back)" by New York rapper Fabolous on production equipment at a local music store.

At age 14, Williams began to develop his own beats on a Korg ES1 beat machine, which his father bought for him as a Christmas present from the local music store Mars Music. As he became more accomplished, he also began to use production equipment, including the Korg Triton, the Akai MPC1000, the Yamaha Motif, and the Roland Fantom. By the time WillIams was 16, he was spending time at local recording studios in Atlanta, trying to shop his beats to established artists. He was initially ignored, but eventually one of his beat tapes made its way into the hands of Gucci Mane, who then invited WillIams to Patchwerk studios, an Atlanta recording studio.

Upon graduating high school, Williams enrolled at Georgia State University to pursue undergraduate studies mainly due to pressure from his parents, but chose to take a hiatus and eventually dropped out after several semesters, with a 3.1 GPA, to focus on his music career.

== Career ==
=== 2011–2012: Production and mixtapes ===
In an interview with XXL, Mike Will said, "Gucci Mane was the first [major artist] to ever rap on my beat." Mike Will first met Gucci Mane at Atlanta recording studio, PatchWerk Recording Studios, and upon introducing himself and giving Gucci Mane a CD of beats, Gucci Mane proceeded to freestyle over each of the instrumentals. He then offered Mike Will $1,000 for one of his beats. The two artists began releasing songs together, such as "East Atlanta 6", and a number of songs from Gucci Mane's mixtape, No Pad, No Pencil. After developing this close relationship with Gucci Mane, he began working with other big-name Atlanta rappers such as Future, Waka Flocka Flame, Rocko, and 2 Chainz.

In 2011, Mike Will released his first single, "Tupac Back", performed by Meek Mill and Rick Ross, from the compilation album Self Made Vol. 1. The single was released on April 5, 2011, and peaked at No. 31 on the Hot R&B/Hip-Hop Songs Billboard chart. This came after Mike Will submitted some of his beats to an A&R for Rick Ross' Maybach Music Group label.

Also in 2011, Mike Will worked with Atlanta rapper Future, producing several popular and noteworthy songs together, including "Ain't No Way Around It", "Itchin", and three songs from Future's 2012 major label debut album Pluto: "Neva End", "Truth Gonna Hurt You", and "Turn On the Lights". "Turn On the Lights" was promoted as a single, and to date has peaked at No. 2 on the Hot R&B/Hip-Hop Songs Billboard chart.

On December 27, 2011, Mike Will released his first mixtape, Est. in 1989 (Last of a Dying Breed). It was released in conjunction with popular mixtape website LiveMixtapes.com. Est. in 1989 includes a mix of exclusive songs and songs from Mike Will's catalog, and features artists such as Gucci Mane & 1017 Brick Squad, Future, Waka Flocka Flame, Kanye West & GOOD Music, 2 Chainz, Lil Boosie, Ludacris, Lil Wayne.

On March 23, 2012, Mike Will partnered with popular music site The FADER to announce the second installment of his mixtape series, Est. in 1989 Pt. 2, and to release the mixtape's first single, "Back 2 the Basics", which features his manager/rapper Gucci Mane, founder/CEO/president of Brick Squad and Waka Flocka Flame. The project Est. in 1989 Pt. 2 features songs with Diddy, 2 Chainz, Juicy J, Future, Lil Wayne, T.I., Mac Miller, French Montana, Jeremih, and others. The album was released again on July 24, 2012, in partnership with LiveMixtapes.com.

Will has also worked extensively with Atlanta rapper 2 Chainz, producing "La La", which features Busta Rhymes, from 2 Chainz, then known as Tity Boi, Codeine Cowboy mixtape and "Got One" from 2 Chainz's T.R.U. REALigion mixtape. According to an interview with Complex magazine, Mike Will has been working together with 2 Chainz "since 2008, when he was Tity Boi...We're kind of like family." In 2012, Mike Will produced the lead single, "No Lie", from 2 Chainz' debut album, Based on a T.R.U. Story, released via Def Jam. The single, which features popular recording artist Drake, was released May 8, 2012, and debuted in the top 50 of the Billboard Hot 100, ultimately peaking at No. 1 on Billboard's Hot R&B/Hip-Hop Songs chart. The single has been certified Gold by the Recording Industry Association of America, selling over 500,000 copies digitally.

In 2012, Mike WiLL Made-It produced "Bandz a Make Her Dance", a single for Taylor Gang rapper Juicy J that also features Lil Wayne and 2 Chainz. The song was listed as one of the 25 Best Songs of Summer 2012 by Complex magazine, and as of September 2012, the single had peaked at No. 14 on the Billboard Hot R&B/Hip-Hop Songs chart.

Mike Will, alongside producers Kanye West, Mike Dean, Lifted, and Anthony Kilhoffer, co-produced the G.O.O.D. Music single "Mercy", which features vocals by Kanye West, Big Sean, 2 Chainz, and Pusha T. "Mercy", released April 3, 2012, served as the lead single from the G.O.O.D. Music compilation album Cruel Summer, and peaked at No. 1 on the Billboard Hot R&B/Hip-Hop Songs chart, while reaching No. 13 on the Billboard Hot 100. Other notable production efforts for Mike Will include the single "Way Too Gone", featuring Future from Young Jeezy's 2011 studio album Thug Motivation 103: Hustlerz Ambition, "Just a Sign" from B.o.B's second studio album Strange Clouds and "Pour It Up" from Rihanna's 2012 studio album, Unapologetic.

In 2012 interviews, Mike Will mentioned upcoming work with Kanye West, Brandy, Big Sean, and Pusha T.

The third installment of the series, entitled Est. in 1989 2.5 was released on December 24, 2012. The mixtape featured guest appearances from Gucci Mane, Future, Rihanna, Big Sean, Trinidad Jame$, Lil Wayne, and other artists.

=== 2013–present: Debut studio album, collaborations, and Creed II soundtrack ===
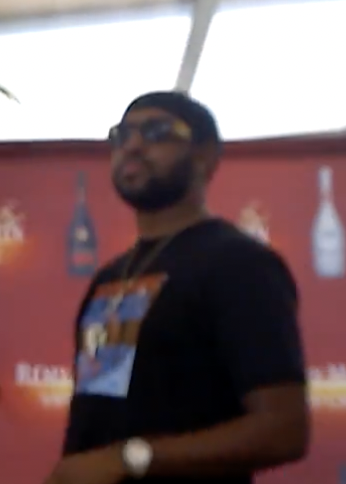
Mike Will Made It in January 2017

Mike Will executive produced Miley Cyrus's fourth studio album Bangerz (2013), including its lead single "We Can't Stop". He produced eight tracks on Bangerz and six tracks on Cyrus' other project Miley Cyrus & Her Dead Petz.

On September 9, 2013, Mike Will premiered his commercial debut single "23", featuring Wiz Khalifa, Juicy J and Miley Cyrus. He revealed that he had signed with Interscope Records to release his debut album. His debut album will also feature Beyoncé, Future, Kendrick Lamar, and 2 Chainz.

He was named producer of the year by HipHopDX on December 18, 2013.

On June 17, 2014, Mike Will Made It released the first single from his mixtape, "Buy the World", featuring Future, Lil Wayne and Kendrick Lamar. On December 15, 2014, he released his fifth mixtape, Ransom. Featured artists include Big Sean, Juicy J, 2 Chainz, Lil Wayne, and Kendrick Lamar.

On March 24, 2017, he released Ransom 2, featuring Rihanna, Kendrick Lamar, Future, Pharrell, Lil Wayne, Big Sean, Migos, YG, and more.

In 2018, the soundtrack for the action-drama film Creed II was released, entitled Creed II: The Album. The album featured all original songs written and produced by Mike Will Made It (with the exception of three tracks).

On August 21, 2020, Mike Will released the single "Bang Bang" with rapper Chief Keef. He also announced that his upcoming project is "74%" done. On November 6, 2020, Mike Will released the song, "What That Speed Bout!?" with rappers Nicki Minaj and YoungBoy Never Broke Again. It is the lead single to his upcoming album, Michael, which failed to meet its 2023 release date.

In 2023, Mike Will partnered with ESPN’s Custom NBA Music Strategy as its first-ever lead producer to curate music for the 2023-24 NBA season. ON October 16, 2023, Mike Will released the new single ‘Different Breed’ featuring Latto and Swae Lee on ESPN.

== Influences ==
In interviews, Mike Will has named several musical influences on his own production work. In a "Behind the Beats" interview with Complex magazine, he says that he "always admired Dr. Dre's drums", and calls Timbaland "the first crazy pop producer... He brought so many artists to the game." As a southern producer, he says, he "was also looking up to Shawty Redd. He was the first producer to really bring that dark trap energy and sound." He also refers to DJ Toomp as "my big brother or my mentor", saying, "I love what he does." In an interview, with AOL's The Boombox, Mike WiLL also cites Pharrell as a producer that he respects. Mike Will told Rolling Stone, that some of his primary musical interests are Arctic Monkeys, Lauryn Hill and The Smiths.

== Production equipment ==
Mike Will uses a variety of production equipment to create beats. His gear includes the Korg Triton, Akai MPC 1000, Logic Pro, FL Studio, Yamaha Motif, and the Roland Fantom-X.

== Ear Drummer Records ==
Ear Drummer Records
- Parent company: Universal Music Group
- Founded: 2013; 13 years ago
- Founder: Mike Will
- Distributor: Interscope Capitol Labels Group
- Genre: Hip-hop
- Country of origin: United States
- Location: Atlanta, Georgia
- Official website: www.eardrummer.co

In 2006, Mike Will started his own production company called EarDrummers Entertainment. In 2013, he founded Ear Drummer Records (initially known as Eardruma Records) and signed the label to Interscope Records on December 19, 2013. In 2014, Mike Will signed Rae Sremmurd (whose name is "Ear" "Drummers" backwards) and Two-9 to the label.

=== Artists ===
- Mike Will Made It
- Shotta Spence
- Two-9
- Rae Sremmurd
- Swae Lee
- Slim Jxmmi
- Eearz
- Andréa
- Trouble (formerly)
- Rico Pressley

=== In-house producers ===
- 30 Roc
- DJ Fu
- Blue Cheeze
- DJ Fu
- Ducko McFli
- GT
- J-Bo
- Lifted
- Marz
- Mike Will Made It
- Pluss
- P-Nazty
- Randy Lanphear
- Resource
- Scooly
- Shawn Ferrari
- Whatlilshoddysay
- F1Jo
- Todd Gleeful

== Discography ==
=== Studio albums ===
List of albums, with selected details
Title	Album details	Peak chart positions			
Title	Album details	US	US R&B	US Rap	CAN
Ransom 2	Released: March 24, 2017; Label: Ear Drummer, Interscope; Format: CD, digital download	24	15	10	77
R3set	Released: March 20, 2026; Label: Ear Drummer, Giant Music	172	—	—	—

=== Soundtrack albums ===
List of soundtrack albums, with selected details
Title	Album details	Peak chart positions	
Title	Album details	US	CAN
Creed II: The Album	Released: November 16, 2018; Label: Ear Drummer, Interscope; Format: CD, digital download	49	63

=== Mixtapes ===
List of mixtapes, with selected details
Title	Mixtape details	Peak chart positions		
Title	Mixtape details	US R&B	US Indie	US Heat
Est. in 1989 (Last of a Dying Breed)	Released: December 28, 2011; Label: Self-released; Formats: Digital download	—	—	—
Est. in 1989 Pt. 2	Released: July 24, 2012; Label: Self-released; Formats: Digital download; Hosted by DJ Infamous, DJ Esco and DJ Green Lantern	—	—	—
Est. in 1989 Pt. 2.5	Released: December 24, 2012; Label: Self-released; Formats: Digital download; Hosted by DJ Drama	—	—	—
#MikeWiLLBeenTriLL	Released: December 23, 2013; Label: Self-released; Formats: Digital download; Hosted by Future	—	—	—
Ransom	Released: December 15, 2014; Label: Ear Drummer Records; Formats: Digital download	—	45	4
Gotti Made-It (with Yo Gotti)	Released: June 1, 2017; Label: Self-released; Formats: Streaming, digital download	40	7	—
Dirty Nachos (with Chief Keef)	Released: March 15, 2024; Label: 43B, EarDrummer Records, RBC Records; Formats: Streaming, digital download; Hosted by DJ Trap-a-Holics & DJ Pharris	—	—	—

=== Singles ===
List of singles, with selected chart positions and certifications, showing year released and album name
Title	Year	Peak chart positions							Certifications	Album
Title	Year	US	US R&B/HH	US Rap	AUS	CAN	FRA	UK	Certifications	Album
"23" (featuring Miley Cyrus, Wiz Khalifa and Juicy J)	2013	11	2	2	39	26	30	85	RIAA: 4× Platinum	Non-album single
"Buy the World" (featuring Future, Lil Wayne and Kendrick Lamar)	2014	—	42	—	—	—	—	—	RIAA: Gold	Ransom
"Drinks On Us" (featuring The Weeknd, Swae Lee and Future)	2015	—	— (Note: "Drinks On Us" did not enter the Hot R&B/Hip-Hop Songs chart, but peaked at number five on the Bubbling Under R&B/Hip-Hop Singles chart.)	—	—	—	—	—	RIAA: Gold	Ransom
"Choppin' Blades" (featuring Jody Highroller and Slim Jxmmi)	2015	—	—	—	—	—	—	—		Ransom
"Nothing Is Promised" (with Rihanna)	2016	75	26	—	69	—	25	64	RIAA: Gold	Ransom 2
"It Takes Two" (with Carly Rae Jepsen and Lil Yachty)	2017	—	—	—	—	—	—	—		Non-album single
"Gucci on My" (featuring 21 Savage, YG, and Migos)	2017	— (Note: "Gucci On My" did not enter the Billboard Hot 100, but peaked at number 10 on the Bubbling Under Hot 100 Singles chart.)	41	—	—	-	—	—	RIAA: Platinum	Ransom 2
"Perfect Pint" (featuring Kendrick Lamar, Gucci Mane and Rae Sremmurd)	2017	—	— (Note: "Perfect Pint" did not enter the Hot R&B/Hip-Hop Songs chart, but peaked at number six on the Bubbling Under R&B/Hip-Hop Singles chart.)	—	—	—	—	—	RIAA: Gold	Ransom 2
"Rake It Up" (with Yo Gotti featuring Nicki Minaj)	2017	8	5	3	—	52	—	—		Gotti Made-It
"Bring It Back" (with Trouble and Drake)	2017	—	—	—	—	—	—	—		Edgewood
"Aries (YuGo), Part 2" (with Big Sean, Pharrell, Quavo and Rae Sremmurd)	2018	—	—	—	—	—	—	—		Non-album single
"Kill 'Em with Success" (with Eearz, ScHoolboy Q and 2 Chainz)	2018	—	—	—	—	—	—	—		Creed II: The Album
"The Mantra" (with Pharrell and Kendrick Lamar)	2018	—	— (Note: "The Mantra" did not enter the Hot R&B/Hip-Hop Songs chart, but peaked at number 47 on the R&B/Hip-Hop Airplay chart.)	—	—	—	—	—		Creed II: The Album
"Bang Bang" (with Chief Keef)	2020	—	—	—	—	—	—	—		Dirty Nachos
"What That Speed Bout!?" (with Nicki Minaj and YoungBoy Never Broke Again)	2020	35	11	10	—	76	—	—		Non-album single
"Status" (with Chief Keef)	2020	—	—	—	—	—	—	—		Dirty Nachos
"Love Don't Live Here" (with Chief Keef)	2021	—	—	—	—	—	—	—		Dirty Nachos
"Blood Moon" (featuring Lil Uzi Vert)	2023	—	—	—	—	—	—	—		Non-album singles
"Different Breed" (featuring Latto and Swae Lee)	2023	—	—	—	—	—	—	—		Non-album singles
"Now or Neva" (featuring Moneybagg Yo and YTB Fatt)	2023	—	—	—	—	—	—	—		Non-album singles
"Wanna Come Thru" (with Coi Leray)	2024	—	—	—	—	—	—	—		Lemon Cars
"Dirty Nachos" (with Chief Keef)	2024	—	—	—	—	—	—	—		Dirty Nachos
"Rooms" (with YoungBoy Never Broke Again and Chief Keef)	2026	— (Note: "Rooms" did not enter the Billboard Hot 100, but peaked at number 10 on the Bubbling Under Hot 100 chart.)	33	—	—	—	—	—		R3set
"—" denotes a recording that did not chart or was not released in that territory.

==== Promotional singles ====
List of singles, with selected chart positions and certifications, showing year released and album name
Title	Year	Peak chart positions					Certifications	Album
Title	Year	US	US R&B/HH	US Rap	AUS	CAN	Certifications	Album
"Black Barbies" (with Nicki Minaj)	2016	65	30	20	47	78	ARIA: Gold	Non-album single

== Awards and nominations ==
=== BET Hip Hop Awards ===
The BET Hip Hop Awards were established in 2006 by the Black Entertainment Television network to celebrate hip-hop performers, producers, and music video directors.

Year	Nomination	Award	Result	Ref.
2013	"Bugatti"	Track of the Year	Nominated	
2013	"Bugatti"	Best Club Banger	Nominated	
2013	Mike Will Made It	Producer of the Year	Won	
2014	Mike Will Made It	Producer of the Year	Nominated	
2014	"Move That Dope"	Track of the Year	Nominated	
2014	"Move That Dope"	Best Club Banger	Won	
2015	Mike Will Made It	Producer of the Year	Nominated	
2016	Mike Will Made It	Producer of the Year	Nominated	
2017	Mike Will Made It	Producer of the Year	Nominated	
2017	"HUMBLE."	Single of the Year	Nominated	
2017	Gotti Made-It	Best Mixtape	Nominated	

=== Grammy Awards ===
Year	Nominee / work	Award	Result	Ref.
2017	Lemonade (Beyoncé)	Album of the Year	Nominated	
2017	"Formation" (Beyoncé)	Song of the Year	Nominated	
2017	"Formation" (Beyoncé)	Record of the Year	Nominated	
2018	"HUMBLE." (Kendrick Lamar)	Record of the Year	Nominated	
2018	"HUMBLE." (Kendrick Lamar)	Best Rap Song	Won	
2019	"King's Dead"	Best Rap Song	Nominated	
2024	Endless Summer Vacation (Miley Cyrus)	Album of the Year	Nominated	

=== iHeartRadio Music Awards ===
Year	Nominated work	Award	Result	Ref
2014	"Pour It Up" (Rihanna)	Hip Hop/R&B Song of the Year	Won	
