= Ransom 2 =

Studio album by Mike Will Made It
- Released: March 24, 2017
- Recorded: 2014–17
- Genre: Hip-hop; trap
- Length: 60:16
- Label: Ear Drummer; Interscope
- Producer: Mike Will Made It (exec.); Steve "The Sauce" Hybicki (exec.); 30 Roc; DJ Fu; Ducko McFli; Ez Elpee; GT; Marz; Micah Weston; Pluss; Resource; S1

Mike Will Made It chronology
Ransom (2014)	Ransom 2 (2017)	Gotti Made-It (2017)

Singles from Ransom 2
- 1. "Nothing Is Promised" Released: June 3, 2016; 2. "Gucci on My" Released: March 3, 2017; 3. "Perfect Pint" Released: May 30, 2017

Professional ratings
Review scores
Source	Rating
The Guardian	4/5 stars
Pitchfork	6.9/10
Exclaim!	7/10

Ransom 2 is the debut studio album by American record producer Mike Will Made It. It is the sequel to his 2014 mixtape Ransom and was released on March 24, 2017. The album features guest appearances by Kendrick Lamar, Rae Sremmurd, Big Sean, Lil Wayne, YG, Pharrell Williams, 2 Chainz, Young Thug, Chief Keef, and others.

== Background ==
On January 4, 2016, Mike Will Made It revealed the cover art for the project while also releasing the first song from the mixtape, titled "By Chance", featuring artists Rae Sremmurd. On January 15, 2016, Mike Will announced on his Twitter account that he would be releasing a song the next day. The following day, "Al Sharpton", featuring American rapper Future was released. On January 23, 2016, Mike Will took to Twitter once again to announce to his fans that Ransom 2 would be dropping the following Friday on January 29. However come Friday, Mike Will then announced that he had delayed the project in order to obtain a guest feature from long time collaborator Gucci Mane, and also have him host the tape. At that point, Gucci Mane was still serving a three-month prison sentence and the police wouldn't allow him to host the mixtape. This meant working with Gucci Mane wouldn't be possible until he was released from prison on May 26, 2016.

On November 15, 2016, Nicki Minaj released her own remix of the Mike Will-produced song "Black Beatles" via her SoundCloud titled "Black Barbies", which was also released commercially. The song peaked at number 65 on the Billboard Hot 100 and was also awarded the 49th spot on Rolling Stone editor Rob Sheffield's 50 best songs of the year.

On February 22, 2017, Mike Will revealed on his Twitter account that he was working on finalizing the album before announcing the release date although he teased it would be released in March 2017. Doing so, he also partially revealed the track listing with the previously released songs being absent from it.

== Singles ==
The first single from the project, "Nothing Is Promised", with Barbadian singer Rihanna, was released on June 3, 2016. The song peaked at number 75 on the Billboard Hot 100 On March 3, 2017, Mike Will released the second official single from the project titled "Gucci on My". The song features guest appearances from 21 Savage, YG and Migos.

== Track listing ==
Album credits adapted from album's liner notes.

Ransom 2
No.	Title	Writer(s)	Producer(s)	Length
1.	"On the Come Up" (featuring Big Sean)	Michael Williams II; Marquel Middlebrooks; Braylin Bowman; Sean Anderson; Osvaldo Golijov	Mike Will Made It; Marz; Resource^{[a]}	3:55
2.	"W Y O (What You On)" (featuring Young Thug)	Williams II; Bowman; Jeffery Williams	Mike Will Made It; Resource	4:22
3.	"Hasselhoff" (featuring Lil Yachty)	Williams II; Miles McCollum	Mike Will Made It	2:10
4.	"Gucci on My" (featuring 21 Savage, YG and Migos)	Williams II; Shayaa Abraham-Joseph; Keenon Jackson; Quavious Marshall; Kirsnick Ball; Kiari Cephus; Bowman	Mike Will Made It; Resource	4:34
5.	"Oh Hi Hater (Hiatus)" (featuring Fortune)	Williams II; Darrie Williams	Mike Will Made It	3:05
6.	"Perfect Pint" (featuring Kendrick Lamar, Gucci Mane and Rae Sremmurd)	Williams II; Matthew Day; Kendrick Duckworth; Radric Davis; Aaquil Brown; Khalif Brown	Mike Will Made It; DJ Fu	4:00
7.	"Razzle Dazzle" (featuring Future)	Williams II; Middlebrooks; Larry Griffin, Jr.; Nayvadius Wilburn	Mike Will Made It; Marz; S1	3:36
8.	"Bars of Soap" (featuring Swae Lee)	Williams II; K. Brown	Mike Will Made It	4:19
9.	"Burnin" (featuring Andrea)	Williams II; Andrea Lanier; Micah Smith	Mike Will Made It; Micah Weston	2:13
10.	"Y'all Ain't Ready" (featuring 2 Chainz)	Williams II; Tauheed Epps; Middlebrooks	Mike Will Made It; Marz	3:42
11.	"Aries (YuGo)" (featuring Pharrell and Station Wagon P)	Williams II; Pharrell Williams	Mike Will Made It	4:31
12.	"Emotions Unlocked" (featuring Eearz)	Williams II; Christopher Lee; Samuel Gloade; Lamont Porter	Mike Will Made It; 30 Roc; Ez Elpee	3:59
13.	"Big God" (featuring Trouble and Problem)	Williams II; Charles Singleton; Mariel Orr; Jason Martin	Mike Will Made It; Ducko McFli	4:11
14.	"Faith" (featuring Lil Wayne and HoodyBaby)	Williams II; Garren Herron; Dwayne Carter; Omololu Akinlolu	Mike Will Made It; GT	4:44
15.	"Come Down" (featuring Chief Keef and Rae Sremmurd)	Williams II; A. Brown; K. Brown; Asheton Hogan; Keith Cozart	Mike Will Made It; Pluss	3:38
16.	"Outro"	Williams II	Mike Will Made It	0:27
17.	"Nothing Is Promised" (with Rihanna)	Williams II; Hogan; Wilburn; Robyn Fenty	Mike Will Made It; Pluss; Kuk Harrell^{[b]}	2:50
Total length:				60:16

Notes

- ^{^[a]} signifies an additional producer
- ^{^[b]} signifies a vocal producer
- "Gucci on My" features additional vocals from Reese Laflare and Kamaiyah
- "Outro" features additional vocals by Tyrina Lee

Sample credits

- "On the Come Up" contains an interpolation from "Night of The Flying Horses", written and performed by Osvaldo Golijov
- "Burnin" contains a sample from "Marijuana", written by Richell Bonner and Devon Wheatley and performed by Richie Spice

== Personnel ==
Performers

- Big Sean – featured artist (track 1)
- Young Thug – featured artist (track 2)
- Lil Yachty – featured artist (track 3)
- 21 Savage – featured artist (track 4)
- YG – featured artist (track 4)
- Migos – featured artist (track 4)
- Fortune – featured artist (track 5)
- Kendrick Lamar – featured artist (track 6)
- Gucci Mane – featured artist (track 6)
- Rae Sremmurd – featured artist (tracks 6, 15)
- Future – featured artist (track 7)
- Swae Lee – featured artist (track 8)
- Andrea – featured artist (track 9)
- 2 Chainz – featured artist (track 10)
- Pharrell Williams – featured artist (track 11)
- Eearz – featured artist (track 12)
- Trouble – featured artist (track 13)
- Problem – featured artist (track 13)
- Lil Wayne – featured artist (track 14)
- HoodyBaby – featured artist (track 14)
- Chief Keef – featured artist (track 15)
- Rihanna – featured artist (track 17)

Technical

- Gregg Rominiecki – recording engineer (track 1)
- Maximilian – recording engineer (track 1)
- Jaycen Joshua – mixing engineer (tracks 1, 6, 7)
- Dave Kutch – mastering engineer (all tracks)
- Matheis "Staffa" Carter – recording engineer (track 2)
- Steve Hybicki – mixing engineer (tracks 2–4, 5, 8, 11–13, 15–17), recording engineer (tracks 3, 16)
- Cyrus "Nois" Taghipour – recording engineer (track 4)
- Mark "Mrii" Rudd – recording engineer (track 5)
- Swae Lee – recording engineer (tracks 6, 8)
- Randy Lanphear – recording engineer (track 6)
- Jay Sremm – recording engineer (track 6)
- Sean Payne – recording engineer (track 6)
- Matt Schaeffer – recording engineer (track 6)
- Seth Firkins – recording engineer (track 7)
- Desmond Barner – recording engineer (track 9)
- BJ Burton – mixing engineer (tracks 9, 10, 14)
- Finis "KY" White – recording engineer (track 10)
- Mike Larson – recording engineer (track 11)
- 30 Roc – recording engineer (track 12)
- Shawty Fresh – recording engineer (track 13)
- Stephen McDowell – recording engineer (track 14)
- Jeff Edwards – recording engineer (track 14)
- Brandon Wood – recording engineer (track 15)
- Marcos – recording engineer (track 17)
- Jasiah "Spydasmix" Posey – assistance mixing engineer (track 17)

Production

- Mike Will Made It – producer (all tracks)
- Marz – producer (tracks 1, 7, 10)
- Resource – additional producer (track 1), producer (tracks 2, 4)
- DJ Fu – producer (track 6)
- S1 – producer (track 7)
- Micah Weston – producer (track 9)
- 30 Roc – producer (track 12)
- Ez Elpee – producer (track 12)
- Ducko McFli – producer (track 13)
- GT – producer (track 14)
- Pluss – producer (tracks 15, 17)
- Kuk Harrell – vocal producer (track 17)

Managerial

- Mike Will Made It – executive producer
- Steve "The Sauce" Hybicki – executive producer
- The Eardrummers – executive producer
- DJ Mormile – management
- Jeremey "Migo The Plug" Ellis – management
- Vinny Kumar – legal
- Aubrey "Aubz" Potter – A&R
- Asheton "Pluss" Hogan – A&R
- Joey "F1JO" Antney – A&R, marketing
- Rashad "Shoddy" Brown – A&R
- Brian "Bwrightous" Wright – marketing, creative director
- Nabil Elderkin – creative director, photography
- Markeidric Walker – art & design
- Irwan Awalludin – art & design
- Manny Smith – A&R
- Gabrielle Graham – A&R coordinator
- Nicole Bilzerian – marketing
- Archie Davis – marketing
- Alicia Graham – A&R admin
- Kam Sangha – production
- Michelle An – creative
- Mark Bridges – creative
- Gary Kelly – revenue
- Tracy Kies – business affairs
- Todd "The Big Dance" Douglas – business affairs
- Ray Alba – publicity
- Aura Harewood – digital marketing

== Charts ==
Chart (2017)	Peak position
Canadian Albums (Billboard)	77
French Albums (SNEP)	152
US Billboard 200	24
US Top R&B/Hip-Hop Albums (Billboard)	15
