= Rooms (song) =

2026 single by Mike Will Made It, YoungBoy Never Broke Again and Chief Keef

Single by Mike Will Made It, YoungBoy Never Broke Again and Chief Keef
- Released: February 13, 2026
- Genre: Trap
- Length: 3:52
- Label: Ear Drummer; Giant Music
- Songwriters: Michael Williams II; Kentrell Gaulden; Keith Cozart
- Producers: Mike Will Made It; Truebeatzz; Aye Shark

Mike Will Made It singles chronology
"Rockstar Raging" (2026)	"Rooms" (2026)

YoungBoy Never Broke Again singles chronology
"Devil Go Away" (2026)	"Rooms" (2026)	"Better Than Yours" (2026)

Chief Keef singles chronology
"Talking Ish" (2026)	"Rooms" (2026)	"Video Shoot" (2026)

"Rooms" is a song by American record producer Mike Will Made It and American rappers YoungBoy Never Broke Again and Chief Keef. It was released on February 13, 2026 as the lead single from Mike Will Made It's second studio album, R3set (2026).

== Composition ==
The song contains trap production with trumpets, over which the rappers perform in melodic, Auto-Tuned vocals.

== Critical reception ==
Tallie Spencer of HotNewHipHop gave a positive review, writing "'ROOMS' marks a new creative high point for the trio, delivering a high-energy, feel-good record primed for heavy rotation. The production is especially infectious, driven by triumphant trumpet arrangements that give the track a championship-anthem feel from start to finish."

== Charts ==
Chart performance for "Rooms"
Chart (2026)	Peak position
US Bubbling Under Hot 100 (Billboard)	10
US Hot R&B/Hip-Hop Songs (Billboard)	33
