= Chief Keef discography =

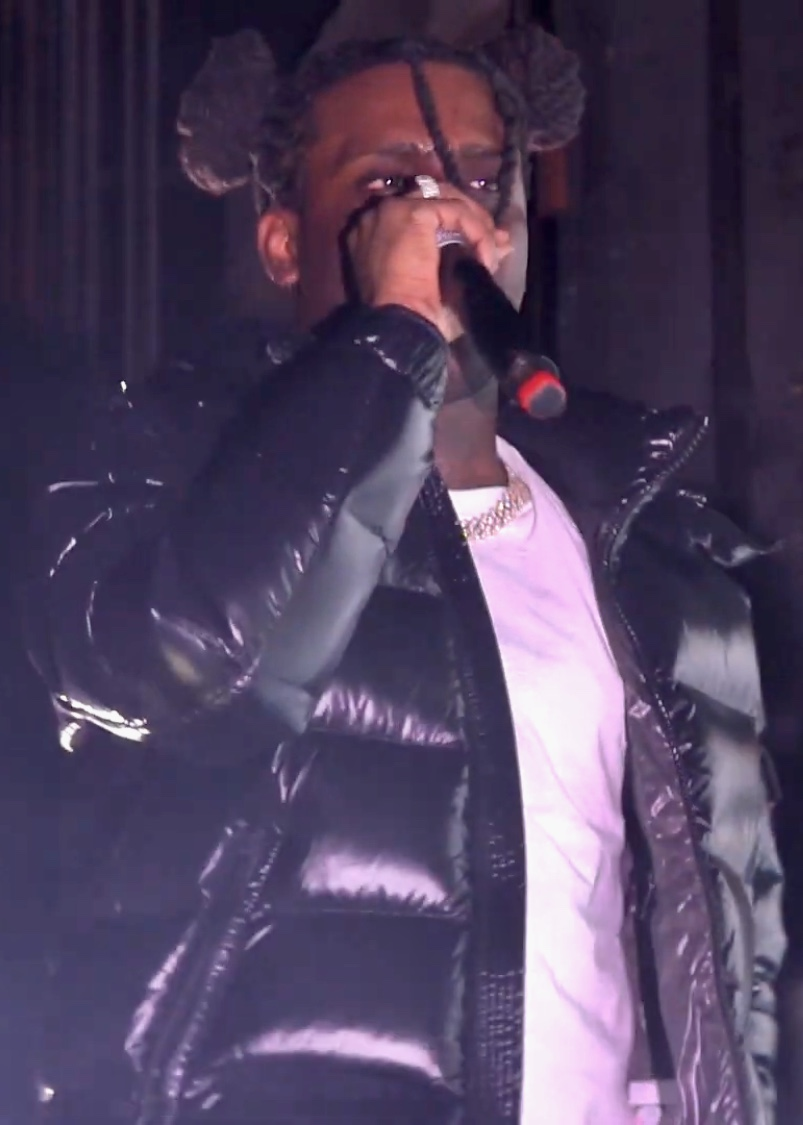
- Cozart performing in 2019
- Studio albums: 5
- EPs: 3
- Compilation albums: 12
- Singles: 69
- Mixtapes: 16
- Collaborative mixtapes: 11
- Collaborative albums: 1

The American rapper Chief Keef has released six solo studio albums, one collaborative album, three extended plays, sixteen mixtapes, eleven collaborative mixtapes, twelve compilation albums and sixty-nine singles (including seventeen as a featured artist). Chief Keef released his first studio album Finally Rich in 2012, which contained several successful singles, including "I Don't Like", "Hate Bein' Sober", and "Love Sosa". The album peaked at number 29 on the Billboard 200 and number 2 on the Billboard Rap chart. In 2013, he was featured on several hit songs by other rappers. In 2014, he released his mixtape Back from the Dead 2, which was critically acclaimed. In 2015, he was featured on Travis Scott's debut album Rodeo on the song "Nightcrawler". He later released the album Bang 3 in two parts. Following this, Chief Keef decided to go on a one-year hiatus. In 2017, he released three mixtapes and then released the album Dedication. He then released more mixtapes in 2018. In 2019, he released his collaborative album with Zaytoven called GloToven which has a sole feature from Lil Pump. He then went on a hiatus for around 2 years, to return with his fourth album 4NEM. In May 2026, Chief Keef was featured on "Legendary Lovers (Save Me)" by Katy Perry, which became his first entry on the Australia and New Zealand charts.

== Albums ==
=== Studio albums ===
List of albums with selected chart positions
Title	Album details	Peak chart positions			Certifications
Title	Album details	US	US R&B/HH	US Rap	Certifications
Finally Rich	Released: December 18, 2012; Label: Interscope, Glory Boyz Entertainment; Format: CD, digital download	29	5	2	RIAA: Platinum
Bang 3	Released: August 1, 2015; Label: FilmOn, RBC Records; Format: CD, digital download, streaming	131	13	9	
Bang 3, Pt. 2	Released: September 18, 2015; Label: FilmOn, RBC; Format: CD, digital download, streaming	104	18	14	
Dedication	Released: November 30, 2017; Label: Glo Gang, RBC, eOne; Format: CD, digital download, streaming	97	39	—	
4Nem	Released: December 17, 2021; Label: Glo Gang, RBC; Format: CD, digital download, streaming	141	—	—	
Almighty So 2	Released: May 10, 2024; Label: 43B; Format: CD, digital download, streaming	30	10	9	
Skeletor	Released: March 27, 2026; Label: 43B; Format: CD, digital download, streaming	—	—	—	

=== Collaborative albums ===
List of albums with selected details
Title	Album details
Nobody (with 12Hunna)	Released: December 16, 2014; Label: 12hunna, 101 Distribution; Format: digital download

=== Mixtapes ===
List of mixtapes
Title	Album details
U.F Overload	Released: October 10, 2009; Label: DJ Kenn (All or Nothing/A.O.N) Records; Format: CD, digital download
Mulah Express	Released: July 1, 2010; Label: DJ Kenn (All or Nothing/A.O.N) Records; Format: Digital download
The Glory Road	Released: July 9, 2011; Label: DJ Kenn (All or Nothing/A.O.N) Records; Format: Digital download
Bang	Released: October 11, 2011; Re-released: October 11, 2021 (10th anniversary edition, No DJ version); Label: Glory Boyz Entertainment, Glo Gang (2021), DJ Kenn (All or Nothing/A.O.N) Records (2021); Format: Digital download
Back from the Dead	Released: March 12, 2012; Label: Glory Boyz Entertainment; Format: Digital download
Bang, Pt. 2	Released: August 15, 2013; Label: Glory Boyz Entertainment; Format: Digital download
Almighty So	Released: October 12, 2013; Label: Glory Boyz Entertainment; Format: Digital download
Back from the Dead 2	Released: October 31, 2014; Label: Glo Gang, 1017, 101 Distribution; Format: Digital download
Sorry 4 the Weight	Released: February 18, 2015; Label: Glo Gang, 1017, RBC Records; Format: Digital download
Finally Rollin 2	Released: November 14, 2015; Label: Glo Gang, 1017, RBC Records; Format: Digital download
Two Zero One Seven	Released: January 1, 2017; Label: Glo Gang, 1017, RBC Records; Format: Digital download
Thot Breaker	Released: June 9, 2017; Label: Glo Gang, 1017, RBC Records; Format: Digital download
The W	Released: September 2, 2017; Label: Glo Gang, 1017, RBC Records; Format: Digital download
Mansion Musick	Released: July 13, 2018; Label: Glory Boyz Entertainment, RBC Records; Format: Digital download
The Cozart	Released: September 28, 2018; Label: FilmOn; Format: Digital download
Back from the Dead 3	Released: October 31, 2018; Label: Glo Gang, RBC Records; Format: Digital download

=== Collaborative mixtapes ===
List of collaborative mixtapes
Title	Album details	Peak chart positions
Title	Album details	US
For Greater Glory Vol. 1 (with GBE)	Released: May 19, 2012; Label: Glory Boyz Entertainment; Format: Digital download	—
For Greater Glory Vol. 2 (with GBE)	Released: October 19, 2012; Label: Glory Boyz Entertainment; Format: Digital download	—
For Greater Glory Vol. 2.5 (with GBE)	Released: December 21, 2012; Label: Glory Boyz Entertainment; Format: Digital download	—
For Greater Glory 3 (with GBE)	Released: August 25, 2013; Label: Glory Boyz Entertainment; Format: Digital download	—
Big Gucci Sosa (with Gucci Mane)	Released: October 30, 2014; Label: 1017 Records, Glo Gang; Formats: Digital download	—
Almighty DP (with DP Beats)	Released: April 1, 2015; Label: Glo Gang; Format: Digital download	—
Almighty DP 2 (with DP Beats)	Released: September 11, 2015; Label: Glo Gang; Format: Digital download	—
Camp GloTiggy (with Zaytoven)	Released: May 13, 2016; Label: Glo Gang, RBC Records; Format: Digital download	—
Cook Sosa (with Cook LaFlare)	Released: October 17, 2017; Format: Digital download	—
GloToven (with Zaytoven)	Released: March 15, 2019; Label: Glo Gang, RBC; Format: Digital download, streaming	153
Dirty Nachos (with Mike Will Made It)	Released: March 15, 2024; Label: 43B, EarDrummer, RBC Records; Format: Digital download	—

=== Compilation mixtapes ===
List of compilation mixtapes
Title	Album details
The Leek (Vol. 1)	Released: June 16, 2015; Label: Glo Gang, RBC Records; Format: Digital download
The Leek (Vol. 2)	Released: June 16, 2015; Label: Glo Gang, RBC Records; Format: Digital download
The Leek (Vol. 3)	Released: November 20, 2015; Label: Glo Gang, RBC Records; Format: Digital download
The Leek (Vol. 4)	Released: March 2, 2018; Label: Glo Gang, RBC Records; Format: Digital download
The Leek (Vol. 5)	Released: March 23, 2018; Label: Glo Gang, RBC Records; Format: Digital download
The Glo Files Pt. 1	Released: May 11, 2018; Label: Glo Gang, RBC Records; Format: Digital download
The Glo Files Pt. 2	Released: May 11, 2018; Label: Glo Gang, RBC Records; Format: Digital download
The Leek (Vol. 6)	Released: December 6, 2018; Label: Glo Gang, RBC Records; Format: Digital download
The Leek (Vol. 7)	Released: January 18, 2019; Label: Glo Gang, RBC Records; Format: Digital download
The Leek (Vol. 8)	Released: July 26, 2019; Label: Glo Gang, RBC Records; Format: Digital download
The Glo Files Pt. 3	Released: November 8, 2019; Label: Glo Gang, RBC Records; Format: Digital download
The Glo Files Pt. 4	Released: March 6, 2020; Label: Glo Gang, RBC; Format: Digital download

== EPs ==
List of EPs
Title	EP details
Ottopsy	Released: June 6, 2018; Label: RBC, Digiglo; Format: Digital download
Trap Symphony EP	Released: November 7, 2018; Label: Glo Gang; Format: Digital download
Extra GLO	Released: May 15, 2020; Label: Glo Gang, RBC; Format: Digital download

== Singles ==
=== As lead artist ===
List of singles, with selected chart positions, showing year released and album name
Title	Year	Peak chart positions					Certifications	Album
Title	Year	US	US R&B/HH	US Rap	AUS	NZ Hot	Certifications	Album
"I Don't Like" (featuring Lil Reese or remix with Pusha T, Kanye West, Big Sean, and Jadakiss)	2012	73	20	15	—	—	RIAA: 2× Platinum; RIAA: Platinum (Remix); RMNZ: Platinum	Finally Rich
"Love Sosa"	2012	56	16	15	—	—	RIAA: 5× Platinum; RMNZ: 2× Platinum; BPI: Gold	Finally Rich
"Hate Bein' Sober" (featuring 50 Cent and Wiz Khalifa)	2012	— (Note: "Hate Bein' Sober" did not enter the Billboard Hot 100, but peaked at number nine on the Bubbling Under Hot 100 Singles chart.)	37	—	—	—	RIAA: 2× Platinum; BPI: Silver; RMNZ: Platinum	Finally Rich
"Citgo"	2013	—	—	—	—	—		Finally Rich
"Ape Shit"	2013	—	—	—	—	—		Almighty So
"Glo Gang Mafia" (featuring Capo)	2013	—	—	—	—	—		Non-album single
"F*ck Rehab" (featuring Big Glo)	2014	—	—	—	—	—		Non-album single
"Colors"	2014	—	—	—	—	—		The Leek (Vol. 1)
"Who Would've Thought" (featuring Future)	2014	—	—	—	—	—		The Leek (Vol. 1)
"Macaroni Time"	2014	—	—	—	—	—		The Leek (Vol. 2)
"That's It"	2014	—	—	—	—	—		The Leek, Vol. 3
"War"	2014	—	—	—	—	—		The Leek, (Vol. 1)
"Fool Ya"	2014	—	—	—	—	—		The Leek, (Vol. 1)
"Faneto"	2014	—	—	—	—	—	RIAA: Platinum; RMNZ: Gold	Back from the Dead 2
"Earned It"	2014	—	—	—	—	—		Non-album single
"Nobody" (featuring Kanye West)	2014	—	—	—	—	—		Nobody
"Voodoo"	2015	—	—	—	—	—		Non-album single
"Ain't Missing You" (featuring Jenn Em)	2015	—	—	—	—	—		Non-album single
"Sosa Chamberlain"	2015	—	—	—	—	—		Sorry 4 the Weight
"Michelin" (with Matti Baybee)	2015	—	—	—	—	—		The Leek (Vol. 2)
"Violence" (featuring Cee Lo Green and Tone Trump)	2016	—	—	—	—	—		Non-album single
"Check It Out"	2016	—	—	—	—	—		Camp GloTiggy
"Can You Be My Friend"	2017	—	—	—	—	—		Thot Breaker
"Going Home"	2017	—	—	—	—	—		Thot Breaker
"Only Thing I Know" (featuring Fedy)	2017	—	—	—	—	—		Non-album single
"My Baby"	2017	—	—	—	—	—		Thot Breaker
"Semi"	2017	—	—	—	—	—		Non-album single
"Mailbox"	2017	—	—	—	—	—		Dedication
"Come On Now" (featuring Lil Yachty)	2017	—	—	—	—	—		Dedication
"Awesome"	2018	—	—	—	—	—		Non-album single
"Black Proud"	2018	—	—	—	—	—		Back From The Dead 3
"Action Figures"	2018	—	—	—	—	—		Back From The Dead 3
"Just What It Be Like"	2019	—	—	—	—	—		Back From The Dead 3
"Spy Kid" (with Zaytoven)	2019	—	—	—	—	—		GloToven
"Boost"	2019	—	—	—	—	—		Almighty So 2
"Fireman" (featuring YoungBoy Never Broke Again)	2019	—	—	—	—	—		Almighty So 2
"PS (Pants Sag)" (with Zaytoven)	2020	—	—	—	—	—		Non-album single
"Bang Bang" (with Mike Will Made It)	2020	—	—	—	—	—		Non-album single
"Status" (with Mike Will Made It)	2020	—	—	—	—	—		Non-album single
"On Gang" (with Tadoe and Ballout)	2021	—	—	—	—	—		Non-album single
"New Bugatti" (with Lil Gnar and Ski Mask the Slump God featuring DJ Scheme)	2021	—	—	—	—	38		Die Bout It
"Love Don't Live Here" (with Mike Will Made It)	2021	—	—	—	—	—		Dirty Nachos
"The Talk"	2021	—	—	—	—	—		4NEM
"Hadouken"	2021	—	—	—	—	—		4NEM
"Harley Quinn" (with Mike WiLL Made-It)	2021	—	—	—	—	—		Dirty Nachos
"Tony Montana Flow"	2022	—	—	—	—	—		Almighty So 2
"Almighty Gnar" (with Lil Gnar)	2022	—	—	—	—	—		Non-album single
"Racks Stuffed Inna Couch"	2022	—	—	—	—	—		Non-album single
"PB&J" (with Lil Gnar featuring Young Nudy)	2023	—	—	—	—	—		Non-album single
"Dirty Nachos" (with Mike WiLL Made-It)	2024	—	—	—	—	—		Dirty Nachos
"Drifting Away"	2024	—	—	—	—	—		Almighty So 2
"Rooms" (with Mike Will Made It and Youngboy Never Broke Again)	2026	— (Note: "Rooms" did not enter the Billboard Hot 100, but peaked at number ten on the Bubbling Under Hot 100 Singles chart.)	33	—	—	—		R3set
"Legendary Lovers (Save Me)" (with Katy Perry)	2026	—	—	—	70	7		Non-album single
"—" denotes a recording that did not chart or was not released in that territory.

=== As featured artist ===
List of singles as a featured artist, showing year released and album name
Title	Year	Album
"Traffic" (Lil Reese featuring Chief Keef)	2012	Don't Like
"Bang Like Chop" (Young Chop featuring Chief Keef and Lil Reese)	2014	Still
"Still" (Young Chop featuring Chief Keef)	2014	Still
"Top In The Trash" (Gucci Mane featuring Chief Keef)	2014	Trap House 4 and Big Gucci Sosa
"Valley" (Young Chop featuring Chief Keef)	2014	Still
"Bang Bang" (Gradur featuring Chief Keef)	2015	L'homme au bob
"Ring Ring Ring" (Young Chop featuring Riff Raff and Chief Keef)	2015	King Chop
"100s" (Tyga featuring Chief Keef)	2017	BitchImTheShit2
"Ride Wit Me" (Robb Banks featuring Chief Keef)	2018	Molly World
"Jetlag" (Matt Ox featuring Chief Keef)	2018	OX
"Sending Nudes" (Ballout featuring Chief Keef)	2019	T.I.
"Lucky" (DP Beats featuring Chief Keef)	2019	DP on the Beat, Vol. 4
"Tip Toe 3" (Riff Raff featuring Chief Keef)	2019	Pink Python
"Treasure Chest" (Riff Raff featuring Chief Keef)	2019	Non-album single
"Tampa Bay Bustdown" (Yung Gravy featuring Y2K and Chief Keef)	2019	GASANOVA
"Drip on My Dresser" (Yung Gravy featuring Chief Keef)	2020	GASANOVA
"Ho fatto" (FSK Satellite featuring Chief Keef and Tadoe)	2020	Padre figlio e spirito

== Other charted and certified songs ==
Title	Year	Peak chart positions				Certifications	Album
Title	Year	US	US R&B/HH	CAN	NZ Hot	Certifications	Album
"Hallelujah"	2013	—	— (Note: "Hallelujah" did not enter the Billboard Hot R&B/Hip-Hop Songs chart, but peaked at number four on the Bubbling Under R&B/Hip-Hop Singles chart.)	—	—		Finally Rich
"Kay Kay"	2013	—	— (Note: "Kay Kay" did not enter the Billboard Hot R&B/Hip-Hop Songs chart, but peaked at number ten on the Bubbling Under R&B/Hip-Hop Singles chart.)	—	—		Finally Rich
"3Hunna" (featuring Rick Ross)	2013	—	— (Note: "3Hunna" did not enter the Billboard Hot R&B/Hip-Hop Songs chart, but peaked at number five on the Bubbling Under R&B/Hip-Hop Singles chart.)	—	—		Finally Rich
"Hold My Liquor" (Kanye West featuring Justin Vernon and Chief Keef)	2013	— (Note: "Hold My Liquor" did not enter the Billboard Hot 100, but peaked at number six on the Bubbling Under Hot 100 Singles chart.)	32	—	—	RIAA: Gold	Yeezus
"Nightcrawler" (Travis Scott featuring Swae Lee and Chief Keef)	2015	— (Note: "Nightcrawler" did not enter the Billboard Hot 100, but peaked at number 12 on the Bubbling Under Hot 100 Singles chart.)	45	68	—	RIAA: 2× Platinum; BPI: Silver; RMNZ: Gold	Rodeo
"Kills"	2017	—	—	—	—	RIAA: Gold	Dedication
"Bean (Kobe)" (Lil Uzi Vert featuring Chief Keef)	2020	19	10	60	9		Lil Uzi Vert vs. the World 2
"Choppa Shoot the Loudest" (with Lil Tecca featuring Trippie Redd)	2021	— (Note: "Choppa Shoot the Loudest" did not enter the Billboard Hot 100, but peaked at number 14 on the Bubbling Under Hot 100 Singles chart.)	—	—	30		We Love You Tecca 2
"Yes Sir"	2021	—	—	—	—	RIAA: Gold	4NEM
"All the Parties" (Drake featuring Chief Keef)	2023	26	19	27	—		For All the Dogs
"Say Ya Grace" (with Lyrical Lemonade and Lil Yachty)	2024	—	—	—	32		All Is Yellow
"—" denotes a recording that did not chart or was not released in that territory.

== Guest appearances ==
List of non-single guest appearances, with other performing artists, showing year released and album name
Title	Year	Other artist(s)	Album
"We Ready For Dis Shit"	2011	Lil Bibby, Lil Reese	—N/a
"Global Now"	2012	SD	Life of a Savage
"Murda"	2012	Waka Flocka Flame, Bo Deal	Salute Me or Shoot Me 4 (Banned from America)
"Rap Shit"	2012	Lil Reese	I Don't Like
"Traffic"	2012	Lil Reese	I Don't Like
"Tote Guns"	2012	Bo Deal, Alley Boy, Joe Moses	The Chicago Code 3
"Russian Roulette"	2012	Fat Trel	For Greater Glory Vol. 1
"Been the Same"	2012	Leekeleek	—N/a
"My Lil Niggaz"	2012	Fredo Santana, Lil Reese	It's a Scary Site
"Gucci (Remix)"	2012	Edai	Forgotten
"Cash"	2012	Slutty Boyz, Lightshow	Dew Jack City and Happy Dew Year
"Tatted Like Amigos"	2012	Kap G	—N/a
"Ugly"	2012	Soulja Boy, D. Flores	Juice II
"Fuck It Up"	2012	Bloody Jay, Rocko	Blatlanta (Bigger Than Rap)
"Foreign Cars"	2012	Soulja Boy	Young & Flexin
"Gun Clap"	2012	Bo Deal, Uncle Murda	Welcome to Klanville
"She Borin'"	2012	SD	Life of a Savage 2
"My Lifestyle"	2012	Big Lean	Can't Stop Now
"Menace II Society"	2012	Philthy Rich	N.E.R.N.L 2
"Gucci Everything"	2012	Red Café, The Game, French Montana, Fabolous	American Psycho
"On It"	2012	Mike Will Made It, Young Scooter	Est. In 1989 2.5 and Street Lottery
"Ratchet"	2013	Rich Kidz, Future	—N/a
"I Got Bag"	2013	Ballout, Gino Marley	—N/a
"Bring Them Things"	2013	Gucci Mane, Young Dolph, Yung Fresh	—N/a
"Backseat"	2013	Gucci Mane, Waka Flocka Flame	—N/a
"Dead Broke"	2013	Fredo Santana, SD, Future	Fredo Kruger
"Round Em Up"	2013	Fredo Santana	Fredo Kruger
"Been Ballin'"	2013	Ballout	Ballin No NBA
"Diamond for Everyone"	2013	Ballout	Ballin No NBA
"Darker"	2013	Gucci Mane	Trap House III
"Rider"	2013	Wiz Khalifa	—N/a
"Hold My Liquor"	2013	Kanye West, Justin Vernon	Yeezus
"Menace II Society"	2013	Philthy Rich	N.E.R.N.L. 2
"So Much Money"	2013	Gucci Mane	World War 3: Molly
"FDB" (Remix)	2013	Young Dro, B.o.B, Wale	—N/a
"Pill Party"	2013	Ballout	From the Streets
"I Got a Bag"	2013	Ballout	From the Streets
"Forgiatos"	2013	Ballout, Capo	From the Streets
"9 On Me"	2013	Ballout, Migos	From the Streets
"What It Look Like"	2013	Lil Reese	Supa Savage
"We Won't Stop"	2013	Lil Reese	Supa Savage
"ETTM"	2013	Success	—N/a
"U Ain't Bout That"	2013	DKG	—N/a
"All These Bitches"	2013	Gucci Mane, OJ da Juiceman	Diary of a Trap God
"Bandz"	2013	Tray Savage	Brain Dead
"Bought A Big K"	2014	Fredo Santana	Trappin Ain't Dead
"Chances"	2014	Young Scooter	Street Lottery 2
"No Friend of Me"	2014	Twista, Stunt Taylor	Dark Horse
"Flexin"	2014	Ballout, Tadoe	Welcome 2 Ballout World
"Welcome 2 Ballout World"	2014	Ballout, Tadoe	Welcome 2 Ballout World
"Baller in Me"	2014	Bandman Kevo	Fast Life
"Strapped (Remix)"	2014	Yae Yae Jordan, YNS Cheeks	—N/a
"Stop Start"	2014	Mike WiLL Made-It, Gucci Mane, Peewee Longway	Ransom
"Trap"	2014	Shawty Lo	King Of Bankhead
"Bring Them Thangs"	2014	Bankroll Fresh, Gucci Mane	—N/a
"Thotties Thoinks & Joints"	2014	Tadoe	Thotties Thoinks & Joints
"Decline"	2015	Lil Durk	—N/a
"Right Now"	2015	Gucci Mane, Andy Milonakis	Views From Zone 6
"On Me"	2015	Ballout & Tadoe	The Rise of Glo Gang
"Maybach"	2015	Andy Milonakis, Fredo Santana	—N/a
"Rollin"	2015	Soulja Boy	Swag the Mixtape
"Dope Game"	2015	Fredo Santana	Ain't No Money Like Trap Money
"Brazy"	2015	Lil Reese	Supa Savage 2
"Nightcrawler"	2015	Travis Scott, Swae Lee	Rodeo
"Cut the Check"	2015	Mac Miller	GO:OD AM
"Already Know"	2015	ManeMane	4CG: The Mixtape
"24"	2015	ManeMane	4CG: The Mixtape
"Haha"	2015	Terintino	Tino Gambino
"Gang Members"	2015	Terintino, Ballout, Tadoe	Tino Gambino
"Gucci Gang"	2015	Justo, Tadoe	JusGlo
"Nigga Wat"	2015	Trigga Black, Lil Reese	300 Life
"What the F*ck is Yall On (Remix)"	2015	Juicy J	Rubba Band Business 2
"Where I Started"	2015	Johnny May Cash, Illboyz	—N/a
"I'm Sick"	2015	Capo	G.L.O.N.L 2
"Now"	2015	Capo	G.L.O.N.L 2
"Fanga Banga"	2016	Rocko	Worldplay 2
"All I Wanted"	2016	Sean Kingston, DJ Twin	Day 1 EP
"Young Man"	2016	Machine Gun Kelly	—N/a
"Down for Some Ignorance (Ghetto Lullaby)"	2017	Vic Mensa, Joey Purp	The Autobiography
"I Don't Know You"	2017	Smokepurpp, Yo Gotti	Deadstar
"High Off Gun Powder"	2017	Fredo Santana, Kodak Black	Fredo Kruger 2
"Come Down"	2017	Mike Will Made It, Rae Sremmurd	Ransom 2
"Blowin Minds"	2017	ASAP Mob, ASAP Rocky, ASAP Nast, Playboi Carti, A$AP Ant	Cozy Tapes Vol. 2: Too Cozy
"Whitney"	2017	Lil Pump	Lil Pump
"17 Wit A 38"	2017	IDK	IWasVeryBad
"Facts"	2017	Lil Bibby	—N/a
"They Can't Stand It"	2017	HoodRich Pablo Juan	Designer Drugz 3
"Flees"	2017	Zaytoven, Tadoe, Doowop	Trapping Made It Happen
"Bust"	2017	Paul Wall, C.Stone	Diamond Boyz
"Spyder"	2017	Ballout, Sada Baby	Can't Ban Da GloMan
"Violence"	2017	Tone Trump, CeeLo Green	American Hustler
"I Need A Break"	2017	Young Chop, PARTYNEXTDOOR	King Chop 2
"Champagne"	2017	NERVO	—N/a
"Ride Wit Me"	2018	Robb Banks	Molly World
"Mileage"	2018	Playboi Carti	Die Lit
"The Ice Ape"	2018	Keith Ape	BORN AGAIN
"OMG"	2018	RL Grime, Joji	Nova
"BILAP"	2018	Trippie Redd	—N/a
"Catch Up"	2018	G Herbo, Southside	Swervo
"Woo"	2018	Soulja Boy	Young Drako
"Water On My Wrist"	2018	Sauce Walka	Drip God
"I Kill People"	2018	Trippie Redd, Tadoe	—N/a
"HuH"	2018	24hrs	B4 Xmas
"Pitbulls"	2018	Skengdo & AM	Greener On The Other Side
"ROXANNE"	2018	CMDWN, Ca$tro Guapo	Atlanada 2
"Sadity"	2018	Cdot Honcho	H4
"Dreamy Dragon"	2018	Alison Wonderland	Awake
"Tip Toe 3"	2019	Riff Raff	Pink Python
"Different (Remix)"	2019	Ballout, Omelly	T.I.
"Country"	2019	Ballout	T.I.
"Sending Nudes"	2019	Ballout	T.I.
"I Wish You Would"	2019	ChopSquad DJ	—N/a
"Company"	2019	Yung Bans, Lil Geno	—N/a
"Brick Man"	2019	Zaytoven, OJ da Juiceman, Al Nuke, Humble G	Make America Trap Again
"Germs"	2019	Zaytoven	Make America Trap Again
"Back Too Back"	2019	Ballout	Ballin No NBA 2
"Ova Seas"	2019	Terintino	Meat Roll 2
"My Woes"	2019	Doowop, Ballout	Cappin Ain't Dead
"No I.D"	2019	Doowop	Cappin Ain't Dead
"Send Em Back"	2019	Doowop	Cappin Ain't Dead
"BBQ"	2019	Lil Reese	GetBackGang 2
"Tampa Bay Bustdown"	2019	Yung Gravy, Y2K	—N/a
"Hot Ham"	2019	K$upreme, Chase the Money, Lil Yachty	Caught Fire
"Juug"	2019	DJ Pharris, Jeremih	—N/a
"Floor Seats"	2019	Riff Raff, DJ Paul	Arrogant American
"Greenroom"	2019	Nimic Revenue	Lifeline Reloaded
"Sucka"	2019	Danny Towers	Tarantula
"Bang Bang"	2019	DY Krazy	DY WENT KRAZY
"Bean (Kobe)"	2020	Lil Uzi Vert	Lil Uzi Vert vs. the World 2
"Bands in the Basement"	2020	03 Greedo, RONRONTHEPRODUCER	Load It Up Vol 01
"Shotta Flow 4"	2020	NLE Choppa	Top Shotta
"Chicken Soup"	2020	Lil Tracy	Designer Talk 2
"Neva Froze"	2020	Doe Boy, Southside	Demons R Us
"Free Ligher"	2020	2 Chainz, Lil Uzi Vert	So Help Me God!
"Haha"	2020	Weiland	Weiland
"Stop Taking Molly"	2020	Young Scooter & Zaytoven	Zaystreet
"Beat Cry"	2020	Young Scooter & Zaytoven	Zaystreet
"Dope Freestyle"	2021	YNW Melly	—N/a
"All 10"	2021	Kuttem Reese	Kutt Dat Boy
"NEW BUGATTI"	2021	Lil Gnar, Ski Mask the Slump God, DJ Scheme	Die Bout It
"Choppa Shoot the Loudest"	2021	Lil Tecca, Trippie Redd	We Love You Tecca 2
"Luigi"	2021	2KBABY	First Quarter
"Make Our Move"	2022	YFN Lucci, Lil Wayne	—N/a
"Keep A Pistol"	2022	DP Beats, YoungBoy Never Broke Again	—N/a
"Hunt"	2022	Cochise	The Inspection
"Gengar"	2022	Sad Frosty	Sandbox
"MURDAMAN"	2022	Yung Manny	OKANLAWON
"One of a Kind"	2022	Compound	—N/a
"Fashion (Remix)"	2022	Pop Smoke	—N/a
"Atlantis"	2023	Trippie Redd	Mansion Musik
"Rock Out"	2023	Trippie Redd	Mansion Musik
"Bad For Me"	2023	Skrillex, Corbin	Don't Get Too Close
"Forecast"	2023	Tobi Lou, FARADA	Decent
"Hit & Run"	2023	Tobi Lou, FARADA, Saba. Internetboy	Decent
"PB&J"	2023	Lil Gnar, Young Nudy	—N/a
"So What"	2023	Lil Bibby, Jeremih	—N/a
"Charlie"	2023	FTP, Frais	—N/a
"All the Parties (Remix)"	2023	Drake, Nicki Minaj	—N/a
"4 ur girl"	2023	Aarne, Big Baby Tape, Toxi$	AA Language 2
"Ghetto Princess"	2023	Sexyy Red	Hood Hottest Princess (Deluxe)
"Bow Bow Bow (F My Baby Mama)"	2023	Sexyy Red	Hood Hottest Princess (Deluxe)
"Fuck The World”	2024	FTP, Sematary, Hackle	—N/a
"Say Ya Grace"	2024	Lyrical Lemonade, Lil Yachty	All Is Yellow
"Louie Coat"	2024	Rich The Kid	Life's a Gamble
"Sh*t Sad"	2024	Ian	Goodbye Horses
"Pleads"	2024	Lil Gnar, Nardo Wick	In My Glory

== Production discography ==
List of producer and songwriting credits (excluding guest appearances, interpolations, and samples)
Track(s)	Year	Credit	Artist(s)	Album
"Fuck Nigga"	2014	Producer	Chief Keef	Non-album single
"Awkward"	2014	Producer	Chief Keef	Non-album single
Tracks 3-11, 13-19	2014	Producer	Chief Keef	Back from the Dead 2
"Can't You Tell" (featuring Tadoe and Lil Reese)	2014	Producer	Ballout	Non-album single
8. "Hard"	2014	Producer	Chief Keef	Nobody
"Ear"	2015	Producer	Terintino	Tino Gambino
3."Sosa Chamberlain"	2015	Producer (with DP Beats)	Chief Keef	Sorry 4 the Weight
12."What Up"	2015	Producer	Chief Keef	Sorry 4 the Weight
22."I Want Some Money"	2015	Producer	Chief Keef	Sorry 4 the Weight
7. "Mike Myers"	2015	Producer	Lil Flash	Art Of Finesse
7. "Smart Mouth"; (featuring Chief Keef)	2015	Producer	Gucci Mane	King Gucci
"Swag School"	2015	Producer	Capo	Gloyalty
"California"	2015	Producer	Mane Mane 4CGG	4CG2
1."Yekim"	2015	Producer	Capo	G.L.O.N.L. 2
11. "Lil Flexer"	2015	Producer	Lil Flash	Beach Bandits
12. "Amanda Bynes"	2015	Producer	Lil Flash	Road Runner
15."Jack Frost"	2015	Producer	Lil Flash	Road Runner
10."Brazy" (featuring Chief Keef)	2015	Producer (with DP Beats)	Lil Reese	Supa Savage 2
2. "Lower"; (featuring Chief Keef)	2016	Producer	Ballout	Life of a GloBoy
5. "Phantom"	2016	Producer	Ballout	Life of a GloBoy
7. "Everyday"	2016	Producer	Ballout	Life of a GloBoy
11. "Wheel"; (featuring Chief Keef)	2016	Producer	Ballout	Life of a GloBoy
2. "Trap Trap"; (featuring Tray Savage)	2016	Producer	JusGlo/Justo	Trappin' Out The Hallways
4. "Chanel"	2016	Producer	JusGlo/Justo	Trappin' Out The Hallways
10. "Freestyle"	2016	Producer	JusGlo/Justo	Trappin' Out The Hallways
12. "Gettin' High"	2016	Producer	JusGlo/Justo	Trappin' Out The Hallways
"I Get High"	2016	Producer (with DP Beats)	Capo	—N/a
"Young Nigga Theme Song"	2016	Producer (produced with DP Beats)	K$upreme, Lil Yachty	—N/a
Tracks 2-3, 5, 7, 9-10, 12-16	2017	Producer	Chief Keef	Two Zero One Seven
8. "My Pistol Make Ya Famous"; (featuring Chief Keef)	2017	Producer	Fredo Santana	Plugged In
3. "Ball On You"	2017	Producer	Terinteno, Lil Yachty	Meatroll
Tracks 1-8	2017	Producer	Cook Laflare	Cook Sosa
10. "No Limit"; (featuring Chief Keef)	2018	Producer	Ballout	Glo Glacier
13. "Blue Tips"	2018	Producer (with TrapMoneyBenny and Hurtboy AG)	Lil Dude	Luciano 3.0
4. "Awesome"	2018	Producer	Chief Keef	Extra Glo
3."Vietnam"	2018	Producer (with Chopsquad DJ)	Chief Keef	Back From the Dead 3
4."Bestie"	2018	Producer	Chief Keef	Back From the Dead 3
5."Baseball Bat" (featuring Tray Savage)	2018	Producer	Chief Keef	Back From the Dead 3
6."Keep It Lit"	2018	Producer	Chief Keef	Back From the Dead 3
7."Gated" (featuring Soulja Boy)	2018	Producer	Chief Keef	Back From the Dead 3
10."Jones Indiana"	2018	Producer (with Chopsquad DJ and DY Krazy)	Chief Keef	Back From the Dead 3
4. "Fireman"	2019	Producer	Ballout	T.I.
11. "Round Killaz"	2019	Producer	Tray Savage	MHGS
7. "Cap Flow"; (featuring Lil Uzi Vert)	2019	Producer	Doowop	Cappin' Ain't Dead
10. "Fleas"	2019	Producer	Doowop	Cappin' Ain't Dead
"One Mo" (featuring Chief Keef)	2019	Producer	Tadoe	Non-album single
10. "Chrome Heart Tags"	2020	Producer	Lil Uzi Vert	Eternal Atake
"AMG"	2020	Producer	Lil Kawaii	Non-album single
9. "Free Lighter"; (featuring Lil Uzi Vert and Chief Keef)	2020	Producer	2 Chainz	So Help Me God
5. "Moolani"; (featuring Chief Keef)	2021	Producer	Lil Reese	Supa Savage 3
16. "Mission Impossible"; (with Lil Tecca)	2022	Producer	Coi Leray	Trendsetter
11. "All The Problems"	2022	Producer (with DP Beats)	YoungBoy Never Broke Again	Ma' I Got a Family
"Triple S"	2022	Producer (with Young Malcolm and DJ Ken Aon)	Lil Gnar	TBA
7. "Let's Get It"	2023	Producer (with DP Beats)	YSL Mondo	1 Of Them Ones
11. "The Detox"	2023	Producer (with DP Beats, Alijah4K, prodby7000)	Summrs	Stuck In My Ways
13. "Rats"; (featuring Chief Keef)	2025	Producer	Tadoe	Big Drillz
