= Almighty So 2 =

Studio album by Chief Keef
- Released: May 10, 2024
- Recorded: 2018–2024
- Length: 65:37
- Label: 43B
- Producer: Chief Keef; Akachi; Bobby Raps; Blackghxst; DP Beats; Johnny Juliano; Kreepstabape; MBZ; Mike WiLL Made-It; ProdKyle; SantanaStar Beats; Shawn Ferrari; Slowburnz; Traxster; Young Malcolm

Chief Keef studio album chronology
4Nem (2021)	Almighty So 2 (2024)	Skeletor (2026)

Almighty So 2 is the fifth studio album by American rapper Chief Keef, released on May 10, 2024, by Keef's label, 43B. It serves as a sequel to Chief Keef's 2013 mixtape Almighty So, as well as the follow-up to both Keef's fourth studio album 4Nem (2021), as well as Dirty Nachos (2024), his collaborative commercial mixtape with producer Mike WiLL Made-It. It features guest appearances from Ballout, G Herbo, Lil Gnar, Tierra Whack, Sexyy Red and Quavo. Production was handled primarily by Keef himself, with uncredited co-production from DP Beats, Traxster, Mike WiLL Made-It, Shawn Ferrari, Johnny Juliano, and Bobby Raps, among others.

Almighty So 2 peaked at number 30 on the Billboard 200, nearly matching his debut album, Finally Rich (2012), which peaked at number 29 on the chart.

== Promotion, delays and release ==
Almighty So 2 was originally announced by Keef in October 2018, during an interview subsequent to his performance at the Rolling Loud music festival in Oakland, California. In response to inquiries regarding upcoming projects for his fans, Keef disclosed plans for Back from the Dead 3, The Cozart and Almighty So 2 all slated for release in the near future.

Roughly seven months subsequent to the initial announcement of Almighty So 2, Keef unveiled the official cover art for the project via his Instagram account on April 6, 2019. Shortly thereafter, on April 9, 2019, Keef dropped the track titled "Boost", serving as a promotional single for the upcoming project.

During the album's rollout speculation arose surrounding a track titled "Mooliani", featuring Lil Uzi Vert, which was initially rumored to be included in Almighty So 2. However, the song was ultimately allocated to fellow rapper Lil Reese for his project Supa Savage 3. This decision was influenced by clearance issues with Lil Uzi Vert's record label.

On July 23, 2022, Chief Keef and producer Akachi released "Tony Montana Flow", the album's lead single.

Chief Keef took to social media on October 14, 2022, to reveal that the album would release on December 16, 2022. On the same day, he dropped the album's second single, "Racks Stuffed Inna Couch". Despite not being initially included in the leaked track list, both "Racks Stuffed Inna Couch" and "Tony Montana Flow" were part of the original list and made it to the December 2022 track listing.

On December 1, 2022, Keef's former producer DJ Kenn posted a video on his vlog series American Dream. In the video, Kenn visited Keef's mansion recently and stated that Keef is continuing to work on the album in his in-house studio.

On January 17, 2023, Chief Keef's new label 43B, posted a recording session for the album, featuring a choir for one of the tracks, as well as announcing that the entire project would be produced by Sosa himself. On November 5, 2023, Keef revealed two new cover arts for the album. After a span of two years marked by several delays and limited updates on the album's progress, an announcement was made via social media on March 7, 2024, revealing that the album had been finalized. Alongside this announcement, a purported tracklist was leaked, revealing a compilation of sixteen tracks, featuring contributions from Ballout, Lil Gnar, G Herbo, and Quavo, each making appearances on four of the tracks.

On May 6, 2024, Chief Keef unveiled the official and conclusive track listing. Alongside this revelation, the official trailer for the album was released, confirming its official release date set for May 10. Sexyy Red and Tierra Whack were included as the sole additional features, enhancing the final track list to include six collaborators in total. "Racks Stuffed Inna Couch" was also omitted from the album.

On May 9, 2024, Chief Keef released the second single, "Drifting Away".

== Track listing ==
All songs produced by Chief Keef except as noted.

Almighty So 2 track listing
No.	Title	Writer(s)	Producer(s)	Length
1.	"Almighty (Intro)"	Keith Cozart; Samuel Lindley	Chief Keef; DP Beats; Traxster	2:53
2.	"Neph Nem" (featuring Ballout and G Herbo)	Cozart; Will Carathan; Herbert Randall Wright III		2:37
3.	"Treat Myself"	Cozart		4:28
4.	"Jesus Skit"	Cozart; Kojo Bediako	Chief Keef; Slowburnz^{[u]}; MBZ^{[u]}	2:18
5.	"Jesus" (featuring Lil Gnar)	Cozart; Bediako; Caleb Shepard	Chief Keef; Mike WiLL Made It^{[u]}; Shawn Ferrari^{[u]}	4:39
6.	"Too Trim"	Cozart; Brandon Alexander Kmiec	Chief Keef; Young Malcolm	4:29
7.	"Runner"	Cozart; Eugene Page; William Page		2:54
8.	"Banded Up" (featuring Tierra Whack)	Cozart; Tierra Whack-Weldon	Chief Keef; SantanaStar Beats; Kreepstabape; Blackghxst	4:26
9.	"Grape Trees" (featuring Sexyy Red)	Cozart; Janae Nierah Wherry		5:03
10.	"1,2,3"	Cozart; Christopher Kenner; John Lennon^{[u]}; Paul McCartney^{[u]}		5:28
11.	"Drifting Away"	Cozart	Chief Keef; Johnny Juliano^{[u]}	4:01
12.	"Never Fly Here" (featuring Quavo)	Cozart; Quavious Keyate Marshall		4:30
13.	"Prince Charming"	Cozart		5:30
14.	"Believe"	Cozart	Chief Keef; Bobby Raps	6:45
15.	"Tony Montana Flow"	Cozart	Akachi; ProdKyle	2:22
16.	"I'm Tryna Sleep"	Cozart		3:15
Total length:				65:37

Notes

- ^{^[u]} signifies an uncredited songwriter and/or producer

Sample credits

- "Runner" contains a sample of "Streetrunner", written by Gene Page and Billy Page, as performed by Nancy Wilson.
- "1,2,3" contains samples of "And I Love Her", written by John Lennon and Paul McCartney, as performed by Bobby Womack; and "Land of 1000 Dances", written by Christopher Kenner, as performed by Wilson Pickett.

== Charts ==
Chart performance for Almighty So 2
Chart (2024)	Peak position
Australian Hitseekers Albums (ARIA)	17
US Billboard 200	30
US Top R&B/Hip-Hop Albums (Billboard)	10
