= Nobody (album) =

Studio album by Chief Keef and 12Hunna
- Released: December 16, 2014
- Recorded: 2013–2014
- Genre: Hip hop; drill
- Length: 36:20
- Label: RBC; Glo Gang; E1
- Producer: 12Hunna; Kanye West

Chief Keef and 12Hunna chronology
Big Gucci Sosa (2014)	Nobody (2014)	Sorry 4 the Weight (2015)

Singles from Nobody
- 1. "Nobody" Released: December 15, 2014

Nobody is a collaborative studio album by American hip hop recording artist Chief Keef and record producer 12Hunna. It was independently released on December 16, 2014, by Keef's Glo Gang label. The album is primarily a solo effort, though includes two guest features from Tadoe and Kanye West. The album's production and lyrics are representative of the drill music genre.

== Release and promotion ==
On November 22, 2014, when Keef announced the release of an album, titled Nobody (also noted as Nobody: The Album), slated for a December 2, 2014 release, it became apparent that the "Nobody" track had developed into its own project, rather than as a portion of Bang 3. The album experienced a slight delay, but was released on December 16 through iTunes digital download. Meaghan Garvey of Pitchfork Media wrote that the album was, "released suddenly and without much fanfare."

=== Artwork ===
On September 2, 2014, Chief Keef released the cover art for the song "Nobody". The cover art features the heads of Keef and Kanye West side by side, seemingly fading into the black background, where Keef was shown holding a bundle of dollar bills up to his ear.

== Music and lyrics ==
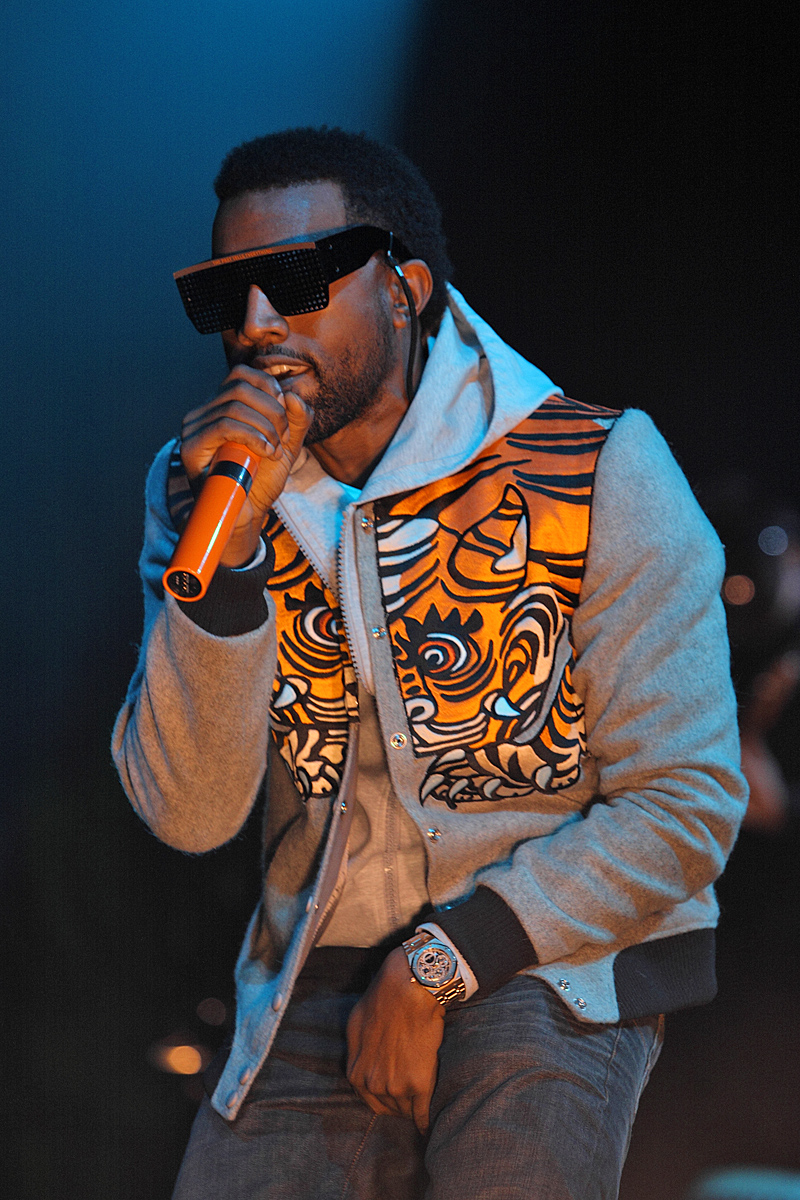
Fellow Chicagoan Kanye West contributed backing vocals on the track "Nobody"

The music on the album was noted to be, "experimental, and equally devoid of any conventional hits." On the album, Keef touches on the concept of his fame, and how it has impacted his life in both positive and negative aspects. The album included "emotional cornerstones," as well as subtle jokes made by Keef at his own expense. Keef also raps about his romantic insecurities that have been compiling in his work since 2012, the, "unflinching ubermasculinity that characterizes drill and its proponents, and beyond that, the temperament expected of black men from a young age."

Specifically, on the track "Nobody", various sources reached a consensus that Keef's slurs and croons over Kanye West's vocals contributed to one of his more emotionally driven songs. Chris Coplan of Consequence of Sound writes that Keef's auto-tuned vocals are, "part slur and part croon", and that Kanye West's, "succinct-yet-soulful backing harmonies sound doubly hazy over rumbling drum beats and the intermittent flutter of keys." The Source writes that the song is, "one of the more emotionally driven cuts we’ve heard from the Chicago rapper in recent history." Garvey writes that the track is, "about Keef at his rawest and most honest," referring to the line, "They thought I was a joke," as being burbled, "with a melancholy that suggests he reads the comments." Zach Frydenlund of Complex, writes that the song is, "decked out in auto-tune from start to finish, as Keef handles the majority of the record with his unique crooning throughout." However, Brennan Carley of Spin, commented, "as West croons in his trademark 808s warble in the background, the drill rapper slurs through bragging lyrics."

== Critical reception ==
Professional ratings
Review scores
Source	Rating
Pitchfork Media	7.0/10 stars

In comparison to Keef's mixtape, Back from the Dead 2, Meaghan Garvey of Pitchfork Media, stated that Nobody was, "sharper, clearer, and more purposeful." Garvey adds her opinions on the tracks, commenting, "a handful feel more like sketches than completed works. But its high points have a clarity unmatched within Keef’s last two years of work; at times, he’s straight up vulnerable. He may not be coming back to earth any time soon, but he’s looking his audience in the eyes." Garvey gave the album an overall score of 7 out of 10, stating, "Nobody is, at its best, strikingly lucid. Maybe his recent passion for visual art has rekindled an interest in direct expression. Maybe he’s just growing up."

== Track listing ==
All tracks are produced by 12Hunna himself, except where noted.

No.	Title	Producer(s)	Length
1.	"Ain't Just Me"		2:16
2.	"Oh! Lawd" (featuring Tadoe)		4:28
3.	"Already"	OhZoneBeats	2:16
4.	"Fast N Furious"		1:59
5.	"Fishin'"	OhZoneBeats; ISOBeats	4:25
6.	"Funny"		3:19
7.	"Gooey"	OhZoneBeats; ISOBeats	1:30
8.	"Hard"	Chief Keef	3:40
9.	"Nobody" (featuring Kanye West)	12Hunna; Kanye West	4:12
10.	"Pit Stop"		3:13
11.	"Twelve Bars"		2:19
12.	"Yeah"		2:23
Total length:			36:20

Samples credits

- "Nobody" samples the instrumentals from Willie Hutch's "Brother's Gonna Work It Out".

=== Nobody (single) ===
"Nobody"

Single by Chief Keef featuring Kanye West

from the album Nobody
- Released: December 15, 2014
- Recorded: 2013–14
- Genre: Drill
- Length: 4:12
- Label: RBC Records; GBE; E1
- Songwriters: Keith Cozart; Kanye West
- Producers: 12 Hunna; West

Chief Keef singles chronology
"Valley" (2014)	"Nobody" (2014)	"Bang Bang" (2015)

Kanye West singles chronology
"I Won" (2014)	"Nobody" (2014)	"Only One" (2014)

"Nobody" is a song by Chief Keef featuring fellow rapper Kanye West. It was released on December 15, 2014, as the lead single and title track from the album.

==== Composition ====
"Nobody" prominently samples Willie Hutch's 1973 track "Brother's Gonna Work It Out", which was also sampled by Chance the Rapper at an earlier date on his 2013 mixtape Acid Rap. West's feature makes heavy usage of auto-tune, which is mixed with his emotions.

==== Release ====
On August 18, 2014, Keef shared a snippet of the track via Instagram. The artwork for it was officially released by him on September 2. It was announced on November 22, 2014, that the song was set to be released on December 2 and would be included on Keef's album of the same title, which shut down any speculation that "Nobody" was set to be a track on Bang 3. However, the track was released at a later date then originally planned, since it came out on December 15, 2014.

==== Critical reception ====
Vibe had praise for both artists on the collaboration, describing it as them trading: 'auto-tuned melodies reflective how they both turned somethin’ into nothin’'. However, Pitchfork had praise for only Keef's work throughout the song, describing it as being him: 'at his rawest and most honest'.
