= Finally Rollin 2 =

Mixtape by Chief Keef
- Released: November 14, 2015
- Label: Glo Gang; RBC Records
- Producer: D. Rich; Fatboi; Jose Palacios; K-Rab; Lex Luger; Metro Boomin; Mike WiLL Made-It; Shawty Redd; Sonny Digital; Southside; TM88; Young Chop; MP808; Zaytoven

Chief Keef chronology
Bang 3 (2015)	Finally Rollin 2 (2015)	Two Zero One Seven (2017)

Finally Rollin 2 is a self-released mixtape by American hip-hop recording artist Chief Keef. The mixtape was hosted by DJ Holiday. It features production from D. Rich, Fatboi, Jose Palacios, K-Rab, Lex Luger, Metro Boomin, Mike WiLL Made-It, Shawty Redd, Sonny Digital, Southside, TM88, MP808, Young Chop & Zaytoven. It was released on November 14, 2015, as a follow-up to his debut album, Finally Rich (2012).

== Track listing ==
No.	Title	Producer / Original Song (Artist)	Length
1.	"Stuntin Like My Mama"	"Stuntin' Like My Daddy" (Birdman and Lil Wayne)	2:54
2.	"Foes"	Zaytoven	2:51
3.	"Black Ops 3"	Sonny Digital	3:38
4.	"Law & Order"	"ESPN" (Bankroll Fresh)	2:52
5.	"Who Dat"	"Who Dat (Young Jeezy song)" (Jeezy)	3:49
6.	"Obama"	Southside; Metro Boomin	3:45
7.	"Flattered"	Zaytoven	3:47
8.	"Gettin Wild"	Zaytoven	3:24
9.	"Get Your Mind Right"	"Get Ya Mind Right" (Jeezy)	3:29
10.	"Chicago Zoo"	"Atlanta Zoo" (Gucci Mane)	3:26
11.	"Early Morning Gettin It"	"Early Morning Trapping" (OJ Da Juiceman)	3:24
12.	"I'm Da Man"	"I'm Da Man" (D4L)	2:09
13.	"X"	Young Chop	2:38
14.	"In Your Face"	Southside; TM88	3:06
15.	"Flex"	Mike WiLL Made-It	2:49
16.	"Dismiss"	Zaytoven	3:21
17.	"Jumanji"	Metro Boomin; Sonny Digital	3:12
18.	"Where Ya At"	"Where Ya At" (Future)	2:42
Total length:			57:16

Deluxe Edition Bonus Tracks
No.	Title	Producer / Original Song (Artist)	Length
19.	"K"	"Squad Car" (Gucci Mane)	2:59
20.	"Madder"	Zaytoven	2:49

Glo'd Up Deluxe Edition Bonus Track
No.	Title	Length
20.	"All Money"	3:28

‘Stunting Like My Mama’ heavily samples Stuntin' Like My Daddy by Birdman and Lil Wayne
