= Bang, Pt. 2 =

Mixtape by Chief Keef
- Released: August 15, 2013
- Genres: Drill; trap
- Length: 42:12
- Label: Glory Boyz Entertainment
- Producers: Dolan Beatz; Zaytoven; Jay Cornell; Prince Chrishan; Yung CED; TraeDashBeats; Abe Beatz; Domeno; CashMoneyAP; Dee Money; Tarentino; Chapo; ZoBeatz; ShadOnTheBeat

Chief Keef chronology
Finally Rich (2012)	Bang, Pt. 2 (2013)	Almighty So (2013)

Bang, Pt. 2 is the sixth mixtape by American rapper Chief Keef. The self-released mixtape is produced by a variety of producers including Zaytoven and Tarentino. It is hosted by DJ Holiday and comedian Michael Blackson. It was released on August 15, 2013 as a follow-up to his 2011 mixtape, Bang. Bang, Pt. 2 is itself a predecessor to the third mixtape in the Bang series, Bang 3. Although heavily panned upon release, it has been more positively looked upon in recent years.

== Background ==
After his 2012 debut album, Finally Rich was met to "generally favorable" reviews, anticipation was built around the release of Bang, Pt. 2. Between Finally Rich and Bang, Pt. 2, Keef served 60 days in a juvenile detention center. However, Keef was active in regards to building hype for the tape, as he released well-received songs, such as "Jet Li" and "Now It's Over". "Now It's Over" was released following his release from juvenile detention.

Additionally, during the period between Finally Rich and Bang, Pt. 2, Keef signed to Gucci Mane's label, 1017 Brick Squad. In a negative review of the Bang, Pt. 2 mixtape, Matt Aceto of Hot New Hip Hop wrote, "As for now, it seems that joining forces with Gucci Mane has only worsened his musical capability."

== Release ==
After being delayed several times, Chief Keef announced via Twitter that he would release the tape on his 18th birthday, August 15, 2013. The tape would mark Keef's first 2013 release. In addition to the announcement of its release date, Keef shortly revealed the cover art. Keef would deliver on his tweet, releasing the tape onto DatPiff.com on his 18th birthday. The mixtape was released onto iTunes on October 18, 2013.

=== Hosting ===
The released tape was originally to have its hosting provided by DJ Holiday, Michael Blackson, and Mike Epps, though HipHopDX writes, "Epps does not seem to appear at any point during the mixtape." A tweet from Chief Keef only credits DJ Holiday and Michael Blackson as hosts of the mixtape.

== Reception ==
=== Critical ===
The mixtape was met to mostly negative reviews. Jake Rohn of BET.com gave the tape 2 out of 5 stars, beginning his review with, "The intro "12 Bars" serves as the perfect preview of what's to come. Keef breathes over the beat for a minute before jumping into an unintelligible verse." Rohn continues, "By the end, Bang Pt. 2 is one of Keef's weaker efforts; and unfortunately, the mostly repetitive beats and lean-happy "Future-esque" hooks make it feel like it's actually twice as long." Rohn concluded his review by praising Blackson's comedic relief skits as the best part of the tape.

Matt Aceto of Hot New Hip Hop also praised Blackson, stating his contributions, "certainly added some animation to the mixtape." Additionally, Aceto was also critical of Keef's effort, writing, "Across the board, Bang Pt. 2 was a struggle. The lyrics were lazy, the mixing was poor, and the beats simply weren’t up to standard. Aside from a couple tracks, this mixtape belongs in the recycle bin." Aceto showed disappointment in Young Chop's absence in the tape's production background, and added, "the majority of songs on Bang Pt. 2 are sloppy and overloaded with auto-tune."

Matthew Trammell of Rolling Stone also gave the mixtape 2 out 5 stars, stating that the tape was filled with, "braindead repetition, cartoonish adlibs, and uncharacteristically limp beats.

=== Commercial ===
As of November 6, 2015 it has been viewed over 3,600,000 times on LiveMixtapes.com and downloaded 393,000 times on DatPiff.

== Track listing ==
No.	Title	Producer(s)	Length
1.	"12 Bars"	DolanBeatz	2:07
2.	"Michael Blackson Skit" (featuring Michael Blackson)		0:36
3.	"Morgan Tracy"	Zaytoven	1:53
4.	"Bank Closed"	Jay Cornell	2:10
5.	"All Time"	Prince Chrishan	3:19
6.	"Fuck Me"	Yung Ced	2:29
7.	"Skit" (featuring Michael Blackson)		0:47
8.	"Chiefin Keef" (featuring Tray Savage and Tadoe)	TraeDashBeats	3:42
9.	"Buy It"	Dolan Beatz	3:28
10.	"Aint Done Turnin Up"	Abe Beats; Domeno	2:05
11.	"Hoez N Oz"	CashMoneyAP; DeeMoney	2:51
12.	"What I Wanna Do"		1:45
13.	"Cause I'm Gettin Money"	Tarentino	2:17
14.	"Skit" (featuring Michael Blackson)		1:29
15.	"2 Much"	Zaytoven	1:44
16.	"No It Dont"	OhZone	2:21
17.	"3"	DeeMoney; Chapo	1:40
18.	"Gotta Glo Up One Day"	ZoBeatz; ShadOnTheBeat	1:57
19.	"Hard Way"	Tarentino	1:50
Total length:			42:12
