= Almighty DP =

Mixtape by Chief Keef and DP Beats
- Released: April 1, 2015
- Genre: Drill
- Length: 59:04
- Label: Glo Gang
- Producer: DP Beats

Chief Keef chronology
Sorry 4 the Weight (2015)	Almighty DP (2015)	Almighty DP 2 (2015)

Professional ratings
Review scores
Source	Rating
Pitchfork Media	7.8/10

Almighty DP is a collaborative mixtape by hip hop recording artist Chief Keef and producer DP Beats. It was self-released on April 1, 2015. Later in 2015, Keef and DP Beats released a sequel to the project, called Almighty DP 2.

== Track listing ==
All tracks produced by DP Beats.

No.	Title	Length
1.	"Bands"	2:41
2.	"Don't Love Her"	2:05
3.	"Doin It"	2:41
4.	"Hot"	1:58
5.	"Runnin"	2:39
6.	"ASAP Rocky"	3:10
7.	"Sleepy"	2:16
8.	"Worries"	2:29
9.	"Wet"	3:10
10.	"Tec" (featuring Tadoe)	3:23
11.	"Side"	2:48
12.	"On the Corner"	3:30
13.	"MCM"	3:00
14.	"Know She Does"	2:14
15.	"Haten"	3:28
16.	"Fool Ya"	3:32
17.	"Need It"	3:32
18.	"10 Toes Down"	3:10
19.	"All In"	7:18
Total length:		59:04
