= All There =

Single by Jeezy featuring Bankroll Fresh

from the album Trap or Die 3
- Released: October 6, 2016
- Genre: Hip hop, trap
- Length: 3:18
- Label: CTE World; Def Jam
- Songwriters: Jay Jenkins; Trentavious White; Dwayne Richardson
- Producer: D. Rich

Jeezy singles chronology
"Let Em Know" (2016)	"All There" (2016)	"Everytime" (2016)

Bankroll Fresh singles chronology
"Dirty Game (Keep Your Eyez Open)" (2016)	"All There" (2016)	"Street" (2016)

Music video
- "All There" on YouTube

"All There" is a song by American rapper Jeezy featuring late American rapper Bankroll Fresh. It was released on October 6, 2016, as the second single from Jeezy's seventh studio album, Trap or Die 3 (2016). The track was produced by D. Rich.

== Music video ==
The music video for "All There" (Directed By Pilot Industries) premiered on October 6, 2016, via WorldStarHipHop. It was uploaded to Jeezy's official VEVO channel on October 31, 2016.

== In popular culture ==
In March 2018, the song was played in the second episode of comedy-drama television series Atlanta's second season.

== Charts ==
Chart (2016)	Peak position
US Bubbling Under Hot 100 (Billboard)	8
US Hot R&B/Hip-Hop Songs (Billboard)	50

== Certifications ==
Region	Certification	Certified units/sales
United States (RIAA)	2× Platinum	2,000,000^{‡}
^{‡} Sales+streaming figures based on certification alone.
