= Two Zero One Seven =

Mixtape by Chief Keef
- Released: January 1, 2017
- Genre: Drill
- Length: 58:06
- Label: Glo Gang; RBC Records; E1
- Producer: Chief Keef; Lex Luger; Young Chop; Leek-e-Leek; CBMix

Chief Keef chronology
| Finally Rollin 2 (2015) | Two Zero One Seven (2017) | Thot Breaker (2017) |

Professional ratings
Review scores
| Source | Rating |
|---|---|
| Pitchfork Media | 7.3/10 |
| HotNewHipHop | 8.0/10 |

Two Zero One Seven is a mixtape by American hip hop recording artist Chief Keef. The mixtape was released on January 1, 2017, by Entertainment One Music and RBC Records. Most of the production on the mixtape is handled by Keef himself, with a few tracks by Lex Luger, Young Chop, and Leek-e-Leek. It is Keef's first release since Finally Rollin 2, released in November 2015.

== Track listing ==
| No. | Title | Writer(s) | Producer(s) | Length |
|---|---|---|---|---|
| 1. | "So Tree" | Keith Cozart; Lexus Lewis | Lex Luger | 3:36 |
| 2. | "Fix That" (featuring Tadoe) | Cozart; Darren Rose | Chief Keef | 3:46 |
| 3. | "Empty" | Cozart | Chief Keef | 3:13 |
| 4. | "Reefah" | Cozart; Lewis | Lex Luger | 3:01 |
| 5. | "Falling on the Floor" | Cozart | Chief Keef | 3:15 |
| 6. | "Short" (featuring Tadoe) | Cozart; Lewis; Rose | Lex Luger | 3:05 |
| 7. | "Knock It Off" | Cozart; Christopher Barnett | Chief Keef; CBMix | 4:18 |
| 8. | "Hit the Lotto" (featuring Kash) | Cozart; Kierra Cozart; Tyree Pittman | Young Chop | 3:58 |
| 9. | "Check" | Cozart | Chief Keef | 4:03 |
| 10. | "Dope Smokes" | Cozart | Chief Keef | 3:43 |
| 11. | "Control" (featuring Tadoe) | Cozart; Rose; Lewis | Lex Luger | 2:45 |
| 12. | "Trying Not to Swear" | Cozart | Chief Keef | 3:26 |
| 13. | "Go (Two Zero One Seven)" | Cozart | Chief Keef | 4:22 |
| 14. | "Telling It All" | Cozart | Chief Keef; CBMix | 3:16 |
| 15. | "Stand Down" (featuring Tadoe) | Cozart; Rose | Chief Keef | 3:18 |
| 16. | "Running Late" | Cozart | Chief Keef | 3:31 |
| 17. | "Anything Gets You Paid" | Cozart; Jonathan Gaboff; Al-Khaaliq Lawrence; Ricardo Colon | J Diesel; Leek-e-Leek; Josue Beats | 1:30 |
| Total length: | | | | 58:06 |

Deluxe Edition Bonus Tracks
| No. | Title | Writer(s) | Producer(s) | Length |
|---|---|---|---|---|
| 18. | "Moonboots" | Cozart; Pittman; Barnett | Young Chop; Chief Keef; CBMix | 3:30 |
