= GloToven =

Mixtape by Chief Keef and Zaytoven
- Released: March 15, 2019
- Genre: Hip hop; trap
- Length: 36:30
- Label: Glo Gang; RBC
- Producer: Zaytoven

Chief Keef chronology
The Leek Vol. 7 (2019)	GloToven (2019)	The Leek Vol. 8 (2019)

Singles from GloToven
- 1. "Spy Kid" Released: February 21, 2019

Professional ratings
Review scores
Source	Rating
Consequence of Sound	C+
Highsnobiety	4/5 stars
Pitchfork	7.5/10

GloToven is the first in a series of collaborative mixtapes by American rapper Chief Keef and American producer Zaytoven. It was released on March 15, 2019, through Glo Gang and RBC Records. It follows Chief Keef's The Leek Vol. 7 mixtape and Zaytoven's 2018 album with Usher, A. The mixtape was preceded by the single "Spy Kid".

== Background ==
Zaytoven called GloToven "one of my favorite albums because it challenges me to produce with youthful, unorthodox creativity"; The Fader in turn called the lead single "Spy Kid" "effortless". Upon announcement of the project, HotNewHipHop called the two an "unlikely duo".

== Track listing ==
No.	Title	Writer(s)	Producer(s)	Length
1.	"3rd Person"	Keith Cozart; Xavier Dotson	Zaytoven	2:56
2.	"Old Heads and Regretful Hoes" (featuring Lil Pump)	Cozart; Gazzy Garcia; Dotson	Zaytoven	3:34
3.	"Batman"	Cozart; Dotson	Zaytoven	3:00
4.	"Ain't Gonna Happen"	Cozart; Dotson	Zaytoven	3:38
5.	"Fast"			2:55
6.	"Spy Kid"			2:53
7.	"F What the Opp Said"			2:48
8.	"Petty"			2:34
9.	"Han Han"			2:59
10.	"Sneeze"			2:57
11.	"Posse"			3:18
12.	"What Can I Say"			2:58
Total length:				36:30
