= Faneto =

Song by Chief Keef

from the album Back from the Dead 2
- Released: October 2, 2014
- Genre: Gangsta rap; trap; drill
- Length: 3:26
- Label: RBC Records
- Producer: Chief Keef

"Faneto" is a song by American rapper Chief Keef from his mixtape Back from the Dead 2 (2014). It slowly achieved underground success, eventually reaching over 60 million cumulative YouTube views, and becoming sought after by MCs, DJs, and radio.

== Summary ==
"Faneto" has been described as explosive, fiery and rhythmic, and odd, atypical-sounding, and unexpected. The song contains heavy ad-libbing and an echoing drum bassline. Chief Keef makes threats like blowing up the state of New Jersey in response to someone stealing jewelry. The song is violent at times, with lyrics such as "Talkin' out his neck, pistol to his throat (To his throat, bang) / Blow this motherfucker, he gon' choke."

=== Other versions ===
In 2015, a ten minute remix of Faneto was made with Chicago rappers Lil Bibby, Lil Herb, King Louie, and Lil Durk, produced by DJ Pharris.

On December 15, 2023 Lil Gnar released a version called "Faneto (Gnar Mix)". The song uses the beat of Faneto.

== Reception ==
The song saw sustained viral success, around 60 million cumulative YouTube views, and was covered by Drake. One review points out that Back from the Dead 2 was one Chief Keef's best mixtapes, and that "Faneto" was the centerpiece of it, helping to cement Keef in the rap game, as the "internet was flooded with infinite remixes of the track, raising the profile nearly every rapper that graced the beat (see: Young Pappy and Famous Dex). Chief Keef was not a fad. “Faneto” made that indisputable."

XXL magazine said that the song has "undoubtedly become one of the biggest hip-hop party anthems in recent years".

Complex reported on the continuity of the songs success: "In April 2015, the Chicago Reader published a story that called attention to the unexpected, 'slow' rise of the song, which had been out for well under a year. Now, here we are, in 2019, and 'Faneto' is just as hot as ever."

When asked why he thinks people are still reacting so passionately to the music five years later, Chief Keef explains that it all stems from the day he initially created the rhythm. "They feel it when it comes on," he said. "When I made the beat, I ain't even know how I wanted to do the drums. I tried something different. You can hear like, how the claps fall. I just went with it, and people fucked with it."

== Certifications ==
Certifications for "Faneto"
Region	Certification	Certified units/sales
United States (RIAA)	Platinum	1,000,000^{‡}
^{‡} Sales+streaming figures based on certification alone.
