= Trap or Die 3 =

Studio album by Jeezy
- Released: October 28, 2016
- Recorded: 2016
- Genre: Hip hop; trap
- Length: 59:37
- Label: YJ; Def Jam
- Producer: 30 Roc; Big Korey; Bruce Almighty; D. Rich; Doda 1K; DJ Montay; Kenoe; Mike Will Made It; Shawty Redd; P.C.; PD; S-X

Jeezy chronology
Church in These Streets (2015)	Trap or Die 3 (2016)	Pressure (2017)

Singles from Trap or Die 3
- 1. "Let Em Know" Released: September 9, 2016; 2. "All There" Released: October 6, 2016

Trap or Die 3 is the ninth studio album by American rapper Jeezy. It was released on October 28, 2016, by YJ Music, Inc. and Def Jam Recordings. The album features guest appearances from Yo Gotti, Bankroll Fresh, French Montana, Lil Wayne, Plies and Chris Brown. The album was supported by two official singles: "Let Em Know" and "All There" featuring Bankroll Fresh.

== Singles ==
The album's first single, "Let Em Know", was released on September 9, 2016. The album's second single, "All There" featuring Bankroll Fresh, was released on October 6, 2016.

== Critical reception ==
Professional ratings
Aggregate scores
Source	Rating
Metacritic	70/100
Review scores
Source	Rating
AllMusic	3/5 stars
HipHopDX	3.3/5
Pitchfork	6/10
XXL	4/5 (XL)

Trap or Die 3 received generally positive reviews from critics. At Metacritic, which assigns a normalized rating out of 100 to reviews from mainstream publications, the album received an average score of 70, based on five reviews.

Andy Kellman of AllMusic said that on the album "Jeezy doesn't say much that deviates from previous ice-veined rhymes, but he attacks just about every track with intense focus and ferocity". HipHopDX reviewer Ural Garrett said that "Pretty Diamonds" is the best track of the album, but felt that the album was below expectations, saying: "Jeezy is better than Trap or Die 3 and he knows it".

== Commercial performance ==
Trap or Die 3 debuted at number one on the Billboard 200, earning 89,000 album-equivalent units, of which 73,000 were pure album sales. It became Jeezy's third number-one album.

== Track listing ==
No.	Title	Writer(s)	Producer(s)	Length
1.	"In the Air"	Jay Jenkins; Demetrius Stewart	Shawty Redd	3:33
2.	"G-Wagon"	Jenkins; Stewart	Shawty Redd	3:46
3.	"It Is What It Is"	Jenkins; Dwayne Richardson	D. Rich	3:15
4.	"Where It At" (featuring Yo Gotti)	Jenkins; Pierre DeJournette; Maurice Jordan; Mario Mims	PD; Kenoe	3:52
5.	"All There" (featuring Bankroll Fresh)	Jenkins; Richardson; Trentavious White	D. Rich	3:18
6.	"Going Crazy" (featuring French Montana)	Jenkins; Richardson; Karim Kharbouch	D. Rich	4:07
7.	"Bout That" (featuring Lil Wayne)	Jenkins; Richardson; Dwayne Carter, Jr.	D. Rich	3:46
8.	"So What"	Jenkins; DeJournette	PD	2:55
9.	"Let Em Know"	Jenkins; Keith Miller; Desmond Gordon	P.C.; Bruce Almighty	3:38
10.	"Recipe"	Jenkins; Michael Williams II; Samuel Gloade	Mike Will Made It; 30 Roc	4:47
11.	"Goldmine"	Jenkins; Korey Robertson; Randy Reid, Jr.; Montay Humphrey	DJ Montay; Big Korey; Doda 1K	3:32
12.	"U Kno It"	Jenkins; Stewart	Shawty Redd	3:16
13.	"Like That"	Jenkins; Richardson	D. Rich	2:59
14.	"Sexé" (featuring Plies)	Jenkins; Richardson; Algernod Washington	D. Rich	4:23
15.	"Pretty Diamonds" (featuring Chris Brown)	Jenkins; Richardson; Christopher Brown	D. Rich	4:29
16.	"Never Settle"	Jenkins; Sam Gumbley	S-X	3:52
Total length:				59:37

== Charts ==
=== Weekly charts ===
Chart (2016)	Peak position
Canadian Albums (Billboard)	60
US Billboard 200	1
US Top R&B/Hip-Hop Albums (Billboard)	1

=== Year-end charts ===
Chart (2016)	Position
US Top R&B/Hip-Hop Albums (Billboard)	34
US Rap Albums (Billboard)	22

== Certifications ==
Region	Certification	Certified units/sales
United States (RIAA)	Gold	500,000^{‡}
^{‡} Sales+streaming figures based on certification alone.
