= Nightcrawler (song) =

2015 song by Travis Scott featuring Swae Lee and Chief Keef

Song by Travis Scott featuring Swae Lee and Chief Keef

from the album Rodeo
- Released: September 4, 2015
- Genre: Cloud rap
- Length: 5:21
- Label: Grand Hustle; Epic
- Songwriters: Jacques Webster II; Khalif Brown; Keith Cozart; Bryan Simmons; Joshua Luellen; Leland Wayne; Michael Dean; Allen Ritter; Glenda Proby
- Producers: Travis Scott; TM88; Southside; Metro Boomin; Mike Dean

"Nightcrawler" is a song by American rapper Travis Scott featuring fellow American rappers Swae Lee and Chief Keef. It was released through Grand Hustle and Epic Records as the seventh track from the former's debut studio album, Rodeo, on September 4, 2015. Produced by Scott himself, TM88, Southside, Metro Boomin, and Mike Dean and additionally produced by Allen Ritter, the six wrote the song alongside Swae Lee, Chief Keef, and Gizzle. The song was considered to be a sleeper hit and first charted in early 2024 after its popularity increased due to people using it as the sound in their videos on the video application TikTok.

== Critical reception ==
The song received widespread critical acclaim from music critics. Josephine Cruz of Hypebeast described the song as "one of the strongest tracks" from Rodeo, elaborating: "Backed by standout production and a catchy hook, this a testament to the songwriting chops of all three of these young rappers, and while a lot has been made of Swae Lee's 'influence' on Travi$' style in recent months, here there's room for everyone to shine". Matthew Ramirez of Spin felt that "Swae Lee's cherubic voice contrasts nicely with Scott's groaned delivery and Chief Keef's Auto-Tuned mumble on 'Nightcrawler,' which hits its precise aim of ominous and fun". Sheldon Pearce of Pitchfork saw "Nightcrawler" and another song, "Maria I'm Drunk", as the best songs on the album, writing that Scott "has an ear for programming", but the two songs "mostly succeed because they overcome his contributions". In 2018, over two-and-a-half years after the release of the song and album, Aaron Williams of Uproxx summarized that "Travis' best songs are often marked by star turns by guest stars acting as foils for his artistic proclivities and 'Nightcrawler' is one of the best examples", adding that "while Travis' singing is often the centerpiece of his catchier tracks, Rae Sremmurd's Swae Lee comes through to highlight just how good Travis is by providing a comparison point for his crooning against one of the best in hip-hop (another great example is Swae's 'Close' from his own album earlier this year)" and "Scott's warbling stands up against Swae's, illustrating the polish on his well-rounded artistic versatility". However, in a negative review, Frazier Tharpe of Complex described the song as "a noisy near misfire".

== Charts ==
2015 chart performance for "Nightcrawler"
Chart (2015)	Peak position
US Bubbling Under R&B/Hip-Hop Singles (Billboard)	8

2024 chart performance for "Nightcrawler"
Chart (2024)	Peak position
Canada Hot 100 (Billboard)	68
Poland (Polish Streaming Top 100)	84
US Bubbling Under Hot 100 (Billboard)	12
US Hot R&B/Hip-Hop Songs (Billboard)	45

== Certifications ==
Certifications for "Nightcrawler"
Region	Certification	Certified units/sales
Poland (ZPAV)	Platinum	50,000^{‡}
New Zealand (RMNZ)	Gold	15,000^{‡}
United Kingdom (BPI)	Silver	200,000^{‡}
United States (RIAA)	Platinum	1,000,000^{‡}
^{‡} Sales+streaming figures based on certification alone.
