= Thot Breaker =

Mixtape by Chief Keef
- Released: June 8, 2017
- Recorded: 2016–June 2017
- Genre: Drill, emo rap
- Length: 43:05

Chief Keef chronology
Two Zero One Seven (2017)	Thot Breaker (2017)	The W (2017)

Thot Breaker is a mixtape by the American rapper Chief Keef, released on June 8, 2017. It received positive reception from music critics.

== Background and recording ==
Although Thot Breaker was first announced in April 2014, all of the tracks were recorded between 2016 and June 2017.

== Composition ==
Thot Breaker consists of 13 tracks, and has a runtime of 43 minutes. It was produced by Mike Will Made It, D. Rich, K.E. on the Track, Young Chop, CBMix, and Chief Keef himself, under his Turbo moniker. The mixtape contains one guest appearance from Young Chop on the track "Slow Dance".

== Release ==
Chief Keef first announced Thot Breaker in late April 2014. He mentioned it again on January 5, 2017, and formally announced its release date of February 14 on January 22. He also shared the mixtape's artwork, which depicts a tattooed woman pushing a knife through a bloody heart. Chief Keef released Thot Breaker's first single, "Get Sleep", on January 23, although it was not included on the mixtape. After the mixtape was not released on February 14, Chief Keef stated it would be released on May 14. When he again failed to release the mixtape on May 14, he told XXL that it would be released on June 9. Chief Keef shared Thot Breaker's tracklist on May 25, and premiered the song "Going Home" on Beats 1 on May 31. Thot Breaker was released on June 8, 2017.

== Critical reception ==
Professional ratings
Review scores
Source	Rating
Pitchfork	8.0/10
Tiny Mix Tapes	4.5/5 stars
XXL	L (Note: XXL assigns ratings on a five-tier scale of "S" to "XXL")

Thot Breaker was well received by music critics. It was included on HotNewHipHop's 2017 year-end list, and was placed 27th on Stereogum's "The 40 Best Rap Albums Of 2017" list.

== Track listing ==
No.	Title	Length
1.	"Alone (Intro)"	2:32
2.	"Can You Be My Friend"	2:47
3.	"My Baby"	3:12
4.	"You & Me"	2:28
5.	"Whoa"	3:32
6.	"Couple Of Coats"	3:56
7.	"Grab A Star"	4:04
8.	"You My Number One"	3:29
9.	"So Cal"	3:10
10.	"Drank Head"	3:53
11.	"My Head"	2:52
12.	"Slow Dance" (featuring Young Chop)	3:52
13.	"Going Home"	3:15
Total length:		43:05
