= Almighty DP 2 =

Mixtape by Chief Keef and DP Beats
- Released: September 11, 2015
- Genre: Drill
- Length: 35:33
- Label: Glo Gang
- Producer: DP Beats

Chief Keef chronology
Almighty DP (2015)	Almighty DP 2 (2015)	Bang 3 (2015)

Almighty DP 2 is a collaborative mixtape by hip hop recording artist Chief Keef and producer DP Beats. It is the sequel to the project Almighty DP, released by the duo earlier in 2015. It was self-released on September 11, 2015. It is available on the mixtape website DatPiff.

== Track listing ==
All tracks produced by DP Beats.

No.	Title	Length
1.	"Ain't Even Know"	3:20
2.	"Bag"	3:20
3.	"Bands"	3:15
4.	"Bouncin"	3:16
5.	"Fair"	3:14
6.	"Fever"	2:52
7.	"Flu"	3:06
8.	"Shorties"	3:06
9.	"Swerve"	3:12
10.	"TD"	3:19
11.	"Where"	3:33
Total length:		35:33
