= Sorry 4 the Weight =

Mixtape by Chief Keef
- Released: February 18, 2015; March 17, 2015 (Deluxe Edition)
- Genre: Drill
- Label: Glo Gang; RBC; E1
- Producer: Chief Keef; The Brain; Chopsquad DJ; DP Beats; GGP; Dolan Beatz; Ace Bankz

Chief Keef chronology
Nobody (2014)	Sorry 4 the Weight (2015)	Almighty DP (2015)

Sorry 4 the Weight is a self-released mixtape by American hip hop recording artist Chief Keef. It was released on February 18, 2015, through Keef's Glo Gang label. The mixtape was produced by a variety of producers including DPGGP, Chopsquaddj, Dolan Beatz, and the in-house GGP (Glo Gang Productions), as well as Keef himself. Additionally, the tape is hosted by DJ Holiday. The tape was largely a solo effort, only featuring guest vocals on two of its tracks, from Andy Milonakis and Glo Gang labelmate, Benji Glo. The title of the mixtape is a reference to Lil Wayne's Sorry 4 the Wait. The Deluxe Edition of "Sorry 4 The Weight" Was Released To iTunes on March 17, 2015. On Spinrilla, Sorry 4 The Weight 2 is available, after being released on November 6, 2016.

== Release ==
The mixtape was self-released by Keef on February 18, 2015, after a slight delay.

== Composition ==
On the album, David Drake of Complex, stated, "even over typical production Keef is more than a rapper," claiming, "he's a pop songwriter at heart," and adding, "records like "W.W.Y.D." and "Yours" show his facility for choruses and melody, while "That's What" exemplifies his continued strength as a creator of hooky, ingratiating rhythmic patterns in the vein of "Love Sosa." On "Get Money," his use of ad-libs to call-and-response his own lead melody in the chorus shows considerably more compositional forethought than most performers today." Included throughout the tape are audio samples of interviews featuring Keef, which Drake states, "sells the rapper as a more sympathetic figure than he's ever been in the public sphere," later adding, "though undeniably charming, they do serve as something of a bluffer's guide for empathizing with a guy painted as a monster by the press."

=== Production ===
The production of the album was done in-house, with Keef self-producing one track. Drake noted, "by and large, the beats slot in well with Atlanta trap production of the last several years, a statement of intent that Keef perhaps isn't as concerned with being a weird rap outsider as much as he is an original voice within a familiar milieu." Keef's self-produced track was praised with Elliot Pearson of The Alibi commenting, "if "What Up" is any indication, he's made serious progress as a beat-maker." Jayson Greene of Pitchfork Media noted, "congas and bongos, clattering busily around the edges of the music, are the most noticeable new addition on Sorry 4 the Weight." On Keef's production of "What Up", Greene writes, "He’s a formal innovator, one who finds lots of ways for his muttering vocals to mesh with the contrary moving lines of his music. His cadences have strange emphases everywhere, and the effect is similar to hearing someone clumping around a floor above you wearing a full leg cast."

== Reception ==
Professional ratings
Review scores
Source	Rating
Pitchfork Media	7.1/10
Complex	3/5 stars

The mixtape received generally positive critical reception. Pearson noted, "This tape is hard as hell and by no means an easy listen, but paranoia, violence and tenderness sometimes come together in the delivery of a line like 'They don’t want me to feed my baby now,' and the effect is felt in the heart." Awarding the tape 3 out of 5 stars, David Drake of Complex writes, "Sorry 4 the Weight finds the rapper in a more focused, writerly mode, when compared with the lunging blunt-force-trauma raps of Back From the Dead 2. Likewise a substantial step away from the pretty, melodic Nobody, Keef is not treading the same old ground." Jayson Greene of Pitchfork Media awarded the tape a 7.1 out of 10 rating, stating, "The loneliness and poetry of "Nobody", say, in which Keef's wandering, bluesy vocal take may as well be a wah-wah guitar solo for all you can make out of it, is missing. Sorry 4 the Weight is more settled-sounding, a "grown" record from an artist who seems grimly determined to move forward at all costs."

== Track listing ==
No.	Title	Producer(s)	Length
1.	"W.W.Y.D."	The Brain	4:38
2.	"Himalayas"	GGP	4:07
3.	"Sosa Chamberlain"	DPGGP	4:14
4.	"Get Money"	Chopsquad DJ; Young Chop	3:11
5.	"Hot Shit" (featuring Andy Milonakis)	DPGGP	3:28
6.	"F'em"	Chopsquad DJ; Young Chop	3:12
7.	"Vet Lungs"	GGP	3:47
8.	"Ten Toes Down"	DPGGP	4:42
9.	"That's What"	Chopsquad DJ	2:39
10.	"Guess What Boy"	DPGGP	3:00
11.	"Please"	GGP	3:31
12.	"What Up"	Chief Keef	4:34
13.	"5AM"	GGP	3:20
14.	"Send It Up"	Chopsquad DJ; Young Chop	3:14
15.	"Hiding"	Chopsquad DJ	5:23
16.	"He Don't Know"	Dolan Beatz	4:03
17.	"On My Momma"	GGP	3:15
18.	"Don't Want None"	DPGGP	3:18
19.	"Yours" (featuring Benji Glo)	GGP	3:06
20.	"Win"	Chopsquad DJ	4:34

Deluxe Edition Tracks
No.	Title	Producer(s)	Length
21.	"Ain't Nothin'"	Ace Bankz	3:23
22.	"I Want Some Money"	Chief Keef	3:32
