= Almighty So =

2013 mixtape by Chief Keef

Mixtape by Chief Keef
- Released: October 12, 2013
- Genre: Drill; trap; cloud rap; gangsta rap
- Length: 38:30
- Label: Glory Boyz Entertainment
- Producer: ISOBeats; Bezz Luciano; OhZone; Abe Beats; CM$ Beats; Yung Lan; Denis37; Young Hitmakers; TraumaTone; Lokey; Qua Beats; Luke Kelly; Jack O'Lantern; PhatBoy; YGOnDaBeat

Chief Keef chronology
Bang, Part 2 (2013)	Almighty So (2013)	Big Gucci Sosa (2014)

Professional ratings
Review scores
Source	Rating
HotNewHipHop	44/100

Almighty So is the seventh mixtape by American hip hop recording artist Chief Keef. The mixtape was hosted by DJ Scream and was self-released on October 12, 2013. It features production from a variety of producers, including ISOBeats and OhZone. The album was poorly received upon release, although retrospective reviews have generally been more favorable.

== Track listing ==
No.	Title	Producer(s)	Length
1.	"Almighty So Intro"	CM$ (Certified Murk Squad)	1:38
2.	"Sucka" (featuring Cdai)	Bezz Luciano	4:49
3.	"Ape Shit"	Yung Lan	2:02
4.	"Hunchoz"	Denis37	1:56
5.	"In Love With the Gwop"	Young Hitmakers	1:51
6.	"Young Rambos"	Abe Beats	2:33
7.	"Blew My High"	TraumaTone	2:36
8.	"Me" (featuring Tadoe)	Lokey	3:30
9.	"Self" (featuring Tadoe)	Qua Beats	3:09
10.	"Nice"	Luke Kelly	2:24
11.	"Salty"	Bezz Luciano	2:50
12.	"Woulda Coulda"	Jack O'Lantern	1:58
13.	"I Kno"	ISOBeats; OhZone	2:26
14.	"Baby What's Wrong With You"	PhatBoy; ISOBeats	2:48
15.	"Yesterday"	YGOnDaBeat	2:00
Total length:			38:30
