= Dedication (Chief Keef album) =

Studio album by Chief Keef
- Released: November 30, 2017
- Recorded: 2016–2017
- Genre: Drill
- Length: 45:35
- Label: Glo Gang; RBC; E1
- Producer: D. Rich; Ness; Stuntman; Chief Keef; K.E. on the Track; Beat Mechanics; CBMix

Chief Keef chronology
Cook Sosa (2017)	Dedication (2017)	The Leek 4 (2018)

Singles from Dedication
- 1. "Text" Released: January 25, 2017; 2. "Mailbox" Released: September 18, 2017

Dedication is the third studio album by American rapper Chief Keef. It was released on November 30, 2017, by RBC Records, Glo Gang & eOne. It contains features from Tadoe, A Boogie wit da Hoodie, and Lil Yachty. The album debuted at number 97 on the Billboard 200.

== Singles ==
Two music videos were filmed, for the album's singles "Text" and "Mailbox". Both were directed by J R Saint and ColourfulMula.

== Track listing ==
No.	Title	Writer(s)	Producer(s)	Length
1.	"Ticket"	Keith Cozart; Dwayne Richardson	D Rich	3:09
2.	"Keke Palmer"	Cozart	Stuntman	3:19
3.	"Mailbox"	Cozart; Richardson	D Rich	3:15
4.	"Cook"	Cozart; Richardson	D Rich	3:45
5.	"Bad" (featuring Tadoe)	Cozart; Darron Rose	Chief Keef	3:19
6.	"Text"	Cozart	Stuntman	3:48
7.	"Glory Bridge" (featuring A Boogie wit da Hoodie)	Cozart; Artist Dubose; Courtney Clayburn	Ness	2:48
8.	"Get It"	Cozart; Richardson; Nayvadius Wilburn; Xavier Dotson	D Rich	2:56
9.	"Negro"	Cozart; Kevin Erondu; Phyllis Hyman	K.E. on the Track; Beat Mechanics	1:56
10.	"Less Speed"	Cozart; Richardson	D Rich	2:53
11.	"Come On Now" (featuring Lil Yachty)	Cozart; Miles McCollum; Chris Barnett	CBMix	2:55
12.	"Kills"	Cozart; Richardson	D Rich	2:50
13.	"Told Y'all"	Cozart; Richardson	D Rich	2:48
14.	"Let Me See" (featuring Tadoe)	Cozart; Rose; Richardson	D Rich	3:06
15.	"Be Back"	Cozart	Chief Keef	2:48
Total length:				45:35

== Personnel ==
Technical

- Slavic Livins – mix engineer

Notes

- "Get It" contains a sample of "Real Sisters" by Future
- "Negro" contains a sample of "Living All Alone" by Phyllis Hyman
- "Kills" was later interpolated in "Praise the Lord (Da Shine)" by A$AP Rocky & Skepta

== Charts ==
Chart (2017)	Peak position
US Billboard 200	97
US Top R&B/Hip-Hop Albums (Billboard)	39
