= Back from the Dead 2 =

Mixtape by Chief Keef
- Released: October 31, 2014
- Genres: Drill; trap; Dungeon synth; Dungeon rap
- Label: Glo Gang; RBC
- Producers: Chief Keef; Young Chop; Purps; Ace Bankz; Chopsquad DJ; CBMIX

Chief Keef chronology
Big Gucci Sosa (2014)	Back from the Dead 2 (2014)	Nobody (2014)

Singles from Back from the Dead 2
- 1. "Faneto" Released: October 2, 2014; 2. "Smack Dvd" Released: October 9,2014

Professional ratings
Review scores
Source	Rating
Pitchfork	7.8/10

Back from the Dead 2 is the eight mixtape by American rapper Chief Keef. It was released on October 31, 2014, and is the sequel to Keef's 2012 Back from the Dead mixtape, bringing back a similar production style as its predecessor.

The project is hosted by DJ Holiday and almost entirely produced by Keef himself. It is mostly a departure from the traditional drill sound that Chief Keef was known for at the time. It has since gained acclaim and a cult following due to its heavily stylized unique production and heavy use of synths and dark ambience.

The single "Faneto" gained worldwide success having over 60 million cumulative YouTube views and over 360 million Spotify streams and becoming one of Keef's most famous songs. The song was officially certified Platinum by the RIAA on March 29, 2024.

== Track listing ==
All tracks are written by and produced by Chief Keef, unless otherwise noted.

No.	Title	Writer(s)	Producer(s)	Length
1.	"Feds"		Young Chop; Chopsquad DJ	3:43
2.	"Paper" (featuring Gucci Mane)	Keith Cozart; Radric Davis; Nathaniel Caserta	Purps	3:27
3.	"Whole Crowd"			4:09
4.	"Faneto"			3:26
5.	"Blurry" (featuring Tadoe)	Cozart; Darron Rose		3:53
6.	"Cops"			4:30
7.	"Where's Waldo"			4:51
8.	"Farm"			3:52
9.	"Homie"			2:45
10.	"Sets"			4:10
11.	"Dear"			4:23
12.	"Stupid"		Young Chop; CBMIX	3:05
13.	"Cuz"			3:59
14.	"Who Is That"			4:20
15.	"Smack DVD"			3:47
16.	"Cashin'"			4:21
17.	"The Moral"			4:14
18.	"Swag"			3:35
19.	"Wayne"			3:49
20.	"B's"		Ace Bankz	3:59
