= Bankroll Fresh =

American rapper (1987–2016)

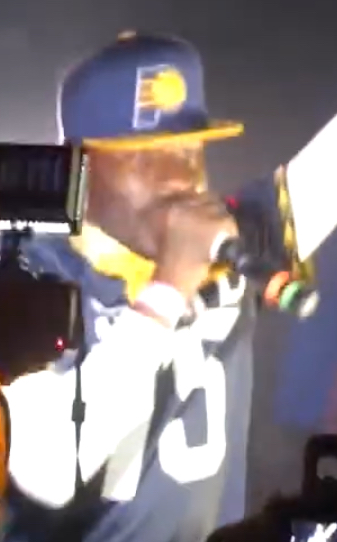
- Bankroll Fresh performing in 2014

Background information
- Also known as: Yung Fresh
- Born: Trentavious Zamon White; August 2, 1987; Atlanta, Georgia, U.S.
- Died: March 4, 2016 (aged 28) Atlanta, Georgia, US
- Genre: Hip hop
- Occupations: Rapper; songwriter
- Years active: 2008–2016
- Label: Street Money Worldwide

Trentavious Zamon White (August 2, 1987 – March 4, 2016), better known by his stage name Bankroll Fresh (or Yung Fresh), was an American rapper from Atlanta, Georgia. He is best known for posthumous guest appearance on fellow Atlanta rapper Jeezy's 2016 single "All There," which received platinum certification by the Recording Industry Association of America (RIAA). Prior, he garnered local attention for his 2015 single "Walked In" (featuring Street Money Boochie and Travis Porter). Also posthumously, he starred in the independent short film Take Over Your Trap in 2016.

== Career ==
White originally rapped under the alias Yung Fresh, and under this alias appeared alongside Gucci Mane on multiple records. In 2014, Fresh collaborated with Mike Will Made It, on the song "Screen Door". Fresh later also made a guest appearance on song "For the Love", which appeared on Metro Boomin's 2013 mixtape 19 & Boomin. Fresh had a hit of his own with the 2014 single "Hot Boy", and the same year, he released the mixtape Life of a Hot Boy. In 2015, Fresh released Life of a Hot Boy 2, and later that year, Fresh followed it up with a self-titled mixtape. In February 2016, he released a video for his song "Poppin' Shit". Fresh was also featured on Jeezy's hit "All There". The music video was released posthumously. Jeezy dedicated it to Fresh, filming the video in his hood with Fresh's family.

== Death ==
On March 4, 2016, White was shot at the Street Execs recording studio in Atlanta following an altercation with fellow rapper and childhood friend Mendez "No Plug" Owens, and died from his injuries at Hughes Spalding Hospital in Atlanta. He was 28 years old. It was reported that more than fifty shell casings were at the scene of the crime. Owens, who was never named a suspect in the case, claimed in an August 2016 interview that he had shot White in self-defense. The investigation concluded in June 2018 after authorities determined that White had fired first with an SKS-style firearm at Owens' vehicle and entourage outside of the studio, and the return shots that killed White were in self-defense.

Artists including Chris Brown, 2 Chainz, Post Malone, Lil Wayne, Left Brain and Plies mourned White's death. Malone paid tribute to White on the song "Money Made Me Do It," on his debut album Stoney. Green Gartside of Scritti Politti wrote a track titled "Trentavious White" and introduced it as part of his 2021 touring setlist.

== Discography ==
=== Studio album ===
- In Bank We Trust (2020)
- Bank Of Amerikka (2025)

=== Mixtapes ===
- Street Motivation (2012)
- Life of a Hot Boy (2015)
- Life of a Hot Boy 2: Real Trapper (2015)
- Rock Solid (with Zaytoven) (Unreleased)
- Bankroll Fresh (2015)
- Made It Through Tha Struggle (2016)
- Live Yo Life (2018)

=== Singles ===
==== As lead artist ====
List of singles as lead artist, with selected chart positions, showing year released and album name
Title	Year	Peak chart positions	Certifications	Album
Title	Year	US R&B/HH	Certifications	Album
"Walked In" (featuring Street Money Boochie and Travis Porter)	2015	— (Note: "Walked In" did not enter the Billboard Hot R&B/Hip-Hop Songs chart, but peaked at number 7 on the Bubbling Under R&B/Hip-Hop Singles chart.)	RIAA: Platinum	Life of a Hot Boy 2: Real Trapper
"I Just Wanna" (featuring T.I. and Spodee)	2016	—		Non-album single
"—" denotes a title that did not chart, or was not released in that territory.

==== As featured artist ====
Title	Year	Peak chart positions		Certifications	Album
Title	Year	US	US R&B/HH	Certifications	Album
"All There" (Jeezy featuring Bankroll Fresh)	2016	— (Note: "All There" did not enter the Billboard Hot 100, but peaked at number six on the Bubbling Under Hot 100 Singles chart.)	50	RIAA: 2× Platinum	Trap or Die 3
"—" denotes a recording that did not chart or was not released in that territory.
