= Big Gucci Sosa =

Mixtape by Chief Keef and Gucci Mane
- Released: October 30, 2014
- Genre: Drill
- Length: 44:53
- Label: 1017 Records; Glo Gang
- Producer: Mike WiLL Made-It; Drumma Boy; Metro Boomin; Honorable C.N.O.T.E.; 808 Mafia; Purps; TM88; Southside; DJ Spinz; Dun Deal

Chief Keef and Gucci Mane chronology
| Trap God 3 (2014) | Big Gucci Sosa (2014) | East Atlanta Santa (2014) |

Chief Keef chronology
| Almighty So (2013) | Big Gucci Sosa (2014) | Back from the Dead 2 (2014) |

Big Gucci Sosa is a collaborative mixtape by Chicago-based rapper Chief Keef and Atlanta-based rapper Gucci Mane. The mixtape was released on October 30, 2014, by 1017 Records and Glo Gang. It features production from Mike WiLL Made-It, Drumma Boy, Metro Boomin, Honorable C.N.O.T.E., DJ Spinz, Dun Deal, and members of the 808 Mafia.

== Track listing ==
| No. | Title | Producer(s) | Length |
|---|---|---|---|
| 1. | "Semi on Em" | Unknown | 2:51 |
| 2. | "Banger" | Drumma Boy | 3:16 |
| 3. | "Turn Up" | Purps | 3:54 |
| 4. | "Don't Loose No Load" | Mike WiLL Made-It | 3:59 |
| 5. | "First Day of School" | Purps; Metro Boomin | 2:46 |
| 6. | "Paper" | Purps | 3:27 |
| 7. | "Baby Daddy Broke" | 808 Mafia | 3:56 |
| 8. | "Sumn Sumn" | Zaytoven | 3:19 |
| 9. | "Start Pimpin" | Honorable C.N.O.T.E. | 2:58 |
| 10. | "Darker" | TM88; Southside | 4:36 |
| 11. | "Top in the Trash" | Mike WiLL Made-It | 3:50 |
| 12. | "So Much Money" | DJ Spinz; Dun Deal | 6:01 |
| Total length: | | | 44:53 |

== Critical reception ==
Big Gucci Sosa received mixed reviews from critics. David Drake of Pitchfork described the mixtape as "parachuting Keef verses into the one-dimensional pulp-gangster formula that’s been Gucci Mane’s collaborative stock in trade since 2011," but praised the mixtape's production and Chief Keef's rapping. Matt Moretti of Buffablog described Gucci Mane as "the trap legend," but called Chief Keef's rapping "less than perfect," rating the album a B.
