= 4Nem =

Studio album by Chief Keef
- Released: December 17, 2021
- Length: 44:27
- Label: Glory Boyz; eOne; RBC
- Producer: 808iden; Akachi; Bass Kids; Bighead; Cello Beats; Chief Keef; Dirty Vans; DJ Paul; Hollywood J; JI; Juicy J; K.E. on the Track; Manzo; Mike Will Made It; Muscle on the Track; Resource; SahBeats; Slowburnz; Sonickaboom; Stuntman Beatz; WhatLilShoddySay; Young Malcolm

Chief Keef chronology
The GloFiles Pt. 4 (2020)	4Nem (2021)	Dirty Nachos (2024)

Singles from 4NEM
- 1. "Hadouken" Released: June 17, 2021; 2. "The Talk" Released: July 12, 2021; 3. "Like It's Yo Job" Released: October 22, 2021

4Nem is the fourth studio album by Chief Keef, released on December 17, 2021, through Glory Boyz Entertainment, EOne Music, and RBC Records. The features on this album include Tadoe and Ballout.

== Background ==
The album title comes from the word "foenem", which is a Chicago slang term used by people to refer to their friends.

Jaffa Saba Creatively directed and produced the album cover. It depicts multiple Chief Keef’s plastic army men fighting in a war, some of which are standing on a stack of money, while some of the others are standing in sand. The sand is also filled with a bunch of jacks placed around across the battlefield. A hidden figurine of Chief Keef can also been seen on the background of the cover art, in one of his signature pose.

Throughout the year of 2021, Chief Keef issued a slew of standalone singles. After 1,000 days since his last mixtape or album, he announced that he would be releasing an album on December 17, alongside an NFT on December 11.

== Singles ==
Three singles were released from the album. The first single, "Hadouken", was released on June 17, 2021. The second single, "The Talk", was released on July 12, 2021. The final single from the album, "Like It's Yo Job", was released on October 22, 2021.

== Critical reception ==
Professional ratings
Review scores
Source	Rating
Clash	7/10
Pitchfork	8.0/10

4Nem was met with much critical praise. Pitchfork's Alphonse Pierre wrote that "the way [Chief Keef] continues to reimagine and reinterpret those influences is part of what makes 4Nem feel so alive". Chris Saunders of Clash called it "one of his best projects to date" and "a welcome return to form for the Chicago native".

== Track listing ==
4Nem track listing
No.	Title	Writer(s)	Length
1.	"Bitch Where"	Chief Keef; Akachi; Sonickaboom	1:52
2.	"Tuxedo" (featuring Tadoe)	Chief Keef; Tadoe; Young Malcolm	3:35
3.	"See Through"	Chief Keef; Bass Kids; Hollywood J	2:31
4.	"Say I Ain't Pick Yo Weak Ass Up" (featuring Ballout)	Chief Keef; Ballout; Young Malcolm	2:46
5.	"Like It's Yo Job"	Chief Keef	3:49
6.	"Ice Cream Man"	Chief Keef	3:17
7.	"Wazzup"	Chief Keef; 808iden; Bighead; Manzo	2:00
8.	"The Talk"	Chief Keef; Akachi; Chello Beats	4:35
9.	"Shady" (†)	Chief Keef; Dirty Vans	2:02
10.	"Yes Sir"	Chief Keef; Stuntman Beatz	4:09
11.	"I Don't Think They Love Me"	Chief Keef; K.E. on the Track	3:06
12.	"Hurry B4 the Gate Close"	Chief Keef; Muscle on the Track	2:39
13.	"Hadouken"	Chief Keef	4:12
14.	"On What"	Chief Keef; Akachi; Slowburnz	3:09
15.	"Picking Big Sean Up" (bonus track)	Chief Keef; Young Malcolm; SahBeats	2:53
Total length:			44:27

Notes

- Track “Shady” was removed from the streaming services

== Charts ==
Chart performance for 4Nem
Chart (2021)	Peak position
US Billboard 200	141
US Independent Albums (Billboard)	17
