= Bang 3 =

Studio album by Chief Keef
- Released: August 3, 2015 (Bang 3, Pt. 1); September 18, 2015 (Bang 3, Pt. 2 and Double CD Physical Edition)
- Recorded: 2013–15; Encore Recording Studios (Burbank, California); Paramount Recording Studios (Hollywood, California); Ameraycan Recording Studios (North Hollywood, California); Costa Mesa Recording Studios (Costa Mesa, California)
- Genre: Drill; gangsta rap
- Length: 92:14
- Label: Glo Gang; FilmOn; RBC; E1
- Producer: Zaytoven; Alki David; B Howard; Slam; Chief Keef; Chopsquad DJ; Will-A-Fool; Wolves; Ace Bankz; DP Beats; BillsProductions

Chief Keef chronology
Almighty DP 2 (2015)	Bang 3 (2015)	Finally Rollin 2 (2015)

Bang 3 is the second studio album by American rapper Chief Keef. The LP is a double album, serving as the third installment of Chief Keef's Bang trilogy. It was leaked online on August 1, 2015. Soon after the album was released officially on iTunes on August 3, 2015, through the label FilmOn Music. The second part of the album was released on September 18, 2015, as well as the double disc being available for purchase in stores. The album features guest appearances from ASAP Rocky, Mac Miller, Lil B and Jenn Em.

Since the album was originally slated for a December 2013 release, it was delayed several times, with numerous release dates falling through or never materializing. After Keef was dropped from Interscope, who owns the album name and its songs, it was unknown whether or not the album would ever be released.

In June 2015, Keef announced that the album would be released July 3, by FilmOnTV and Greek billionaire Alki David. The album was then pushed back to July 14, with "Ain't Missing You", the first post-Interscope single, released on the July 3, instead. However, the album was once again pushed back to August 18, until being released 2 weeks early on August 1. This was followed by Chief Keef announcing the second part of the album being released on August 18, only to be delayed again to September 18, while instead only releasing the single "Bouncin".

== Background ==
Bang 3 was originally planned to be released on December 25, 2013, as a mixtape. However, in February 2014, Chief's manager, Peeda Pan, announced the project would be developed into a full-length album. In late February it was announced Chief Keef was planning to release the EP Bang 4, as a "preview" for Bang 3. However, as Bang 3, kept getting pushed back, so did Bang 4, until November when Chief Keef continued to go through with his plan of releasing the EP.

While Chief was still signed with Interscope Records, the label's executive, Larry Jackson, announced a June 10, 2014 release date. The album was later delayed to a September 30 release, and following another push back after that, Chief was dropped from Interscope Records. This is despite Jackson previously stating that he and the label were behind Keef and Bang 3. An AllHipHop report details Interscope's disinterest in releasing a follow-up album to Finally Rich. An anonymous source for the report details, "Keef’s team tried to have formal meetings but nothing moved." Legal issues that Keef dealt with seemed to cause Interscope to "subtly disassociate" with Keef.

Regardless, Chief Keef maintained that he would release the album himself, and after confirming his departure from the label, tweeted "One-hundred percent of everything goes to me now." Additionally, Keef confirmed that he would be planning a Christmas release for the album. However, once again, the album's release did not materialize.

Although delayed several times, Chief would release tracks from the album, to allow people to know that the album would still be eventually released. In July 2014, Chief Keef released a tentative track listing, revealing that Lil B will be featuring on the album. A$AP Rocky was also confirmed be featured on the album on the track "Superheroes". Fellow Chicago rapper and previous collaborator, Kanye West, was also set to feature on the track "Nobody", until that project developed into its own album. Keef decided to rework the entirety of Bang 3's track list, except for "Superheroes", which appeared on the final album. On July 25, 2015, Chief Keef organized a promotional concert for Bang 3, which also served as a charity concert to help out the victims of a drive-by shooting that left Keef's fellow Glo Gang member, Capo, as well as 1-year-old child Dillan Harris dead. Due to outstanding warrants, Keef performed via hologram. However, during the concert, Hammond police shut down the concert.

On August 1, 2015, 2 songs from the album featuring A$AP Rocky and Mac Miller were leaked. Soon after the album was released for free as a mixtape on the website Hot New Hip Hop and other mixtape sites. The next day, the mixtape was removed from Hot New Hip Hop at the request of Alki David, and was made available through FilmOnTV for purchase. The official version was then made available for purchase on iTunes on August 3, 2015. Later that day Keef via social media, Keef told fans Bang 3 was a double disc album. On August 8 an official release date for the second part of Bang 3 was set for August 18 which was the original release date for the album. However, come August 18 the album was delayed to September 18th with a pre-order made available. The album would then be released on September 18 with a physical edition available which included both discs and advertising 3 bonus tracks (T'd, 'Ignorant' and 'Told Ya'). Due to a technical error, the 3 bonus tracks were not featured on the physical edition and as compensation an employee of FilmOn provided those with proof of purchase 2 extra tracks ('Off The Tooka/Tooka' and 'Real Money') as well as the original advertised 3 bonus tracks.

== Reception ==
Professional ratings
Review scores
Source	Rating
AllMusic	3.5/5 stars
HipHopDX	3.5/5
Pitchfork	7.1/10

Bang 3 was met with a generally positive reception, critics argued that it's his most polished work since Finally Rich. "The higher, clearer production values are most immediately noticeable—this is the crispest-sounding Keef release since 2012's Finally Rich—and its well-ironed-out song structures." said Pitchfork. HipHopDX argued, "Bang 3 isn’t precisely a return to Finally Rich form as that version of Sosa may be long gone but, it is the closest he’s gotten in his continuing journey of wide-ranging sonic discovery. It isn’t Chief Keef at his best or even his most interesting; it’s Keef at his most pliable." Critics also praised Chief Keef's growth and experimentation with Pitchfork saying, "it's the work of a mature rapper and songwriter, putting the skills he developed over several years spent branching out stylistically to good use". As of January 2017 Bang 3 Sold around 63,000 copies which includes 22,000 copies of streams in the US. HipHopDX weighed in that, "Singing To The Cheese,” eschews normal time in favor of Keef's abstract arrangements without unraveling; moving forward while also moving sideways. It's a reminder of everything Chief Keef has been and everything he can be." Tiny Mix Tapes also added, "Getting dropped from Interscope might be the best thing that ever happened to Chief Keef, or at least the best thing for his music (his recent partnership with FilmOn remains a mysterious business move that hasn't seemed to confine him creatively whatsoever). It’s hard to imagine a major-Keef getting away with the chorus on the massive, self-produced opener “Pee Pee’d”.

== Singles ==
On July 3, 2015, "Ain't Missing You", a tribute to Keef's late cousin and fellow Glo Gang member, Big Glo was released. The song featured Jenn Em and the video was released by FilmOnTV.

== Track listing ==
Part 1
No.	Title	Writer(s)	Producer(s)	Length
1.	"Laurel Canyon"	Keith Cozart; Darrell Jackson	Chopsquad DJ	3:34
2.	"Cappin"	Cozart; Xavier Dotson	Zaytoven	3:16
3.	"Unstoppable"	Cozart; Jackson	Chopsquad DJ	3:25
4.	"Superheroes" (featuring A$AP Rocky)	Cozart; Rakim Mayers; Decanter Alexandre	Slam	4:02
5.	"Singing to the Cheese"	Cozart	Chief Keef	3:07
6.	"Pick One"	Cozart; Don Paschall	DP Beats	3:14
7.	"New School"	Cozart; Dotson	Zaytoven	3:28
8.	"Facts"	Cozart	Chief Keef	3:47
9.	"I Just Wanna" (featuring Mac Miller)	Cozart; Jackson; Malcolm McCormick	Chief Keef; Chopsquad DJ	5:18
10.	"Yes"	Cozart; Jackson	Chopsquad DJ	3:29
11.	"Ain't Missing You" (featuring Jenn Em)	Cozart; Alki David; Brandon Howard	Alki David; B Howard	3:19
12.	"Million$"	Cozart; Dotson	Zaytoven	3:03
13.	"Go Harder"	Cozart	Chief Keef	2:57
14.	"Green Light"	Cozart	Chief Keef	3:08
Total length:				49:21

Part 2
No.	Title	Writer(s)	Producer(s)	Length
1.	"Pee Pee'd"	Cozart	Chief Keef	3:38
2.	"Wit It"	Cozart; Jackson	Chopsquad DJ	4:32
3.	"Bouncin"	Cozart; Paschall	DP Beats	3:15
4.	"Charge My Car"	Cozart; Dotson	Zaytoven	3:16
5.	"Get That Sack"	Cozart	Chief Keef	3:30
6.	"Irri" (featuring Lil B)	Cozart; Brandon Christopher McCartney; Willie Jerome Byrd	Will-a-Fool	3:19
7.	"Racist"	Cozart; Dotson	Zaytoven	4:17
8.	"Gloin"		Chief Keef	3:11
9.	"That Night"	Cozart	Chief Keef	2:48
10.	"It's More"	Cozart; Ace Bankz	Ace Bankz	3:33
11.	"OG Fiji"	Cozart; Dotson	Zaytoven	4:11
12.	"Tree Tree"	Cozart	Chief Keef	3:23
Total length:				42:53

FilmOn "Proof Of Purchase" Bonus Tracks
No.	Title	Writer(s)	Producer(s)	Length
1.	"T'd"	Cozart; Paschall	Chief Keef; DP Beats	3:14
2.	"Ignorant"	Cozart	Wolves	6:26
3.	"Told Ya"	Cozart	Chief Keef	2:53
4.	"Off The Tooka" (featuring Tadoe)	Cozart; Darron Rose	YK808	2:12
5.	"Real Money"	Cozart	Chief Keef	3:14
Total length:				17:59

== Personnel ==
Credits for Bang 3 adapted from liner notes in CD case

- Alki David — Executive Producer
- Zaytoven — Producer
- ChopSquad DJ — Producer
- Brandon Howard — Producer
- Slam — Producer
- DP Beats — Producer
- Wolves — Producer
- Will-A-Fool — Producer
- Ace Bankz — Producer
- BillsProductions — Producer
- ASAP Rocky — Featured Artist
- Mac Miller — Featured Artist
- Jenn Em — Featured Artist
- Lil B — Featured Artist
- Tadoe — Featured Artist
- Chris Cheney — Mix Engineer/Engineer
- Nick Fainbarg — Mix Engineer/Engineer
- Brandon Balsz — Mix Engineer/Engineer
- Josh Berg — Mix Engineer
- Slavic Livins — Mix Engineer
- Adam Catania — Engineer
- Frank Ramirez — Engineer
- Andy Rodriguez — Assistant Engineer
- Encore — Recording Studio
- Paramount — Recording Studio
- Ameraycan — Recording Studio
- Costa Mesa Recording Studios — Recording Studio
- Grant Zimmerman — Project Coordinator/A&R
- Lamero Ragsdale — Art Cover/Art Direction
- Chaz L. Morgan — Art Cover/Art Direction
- Frank Torres — Art Cover/Art Direction
- Rovaun Pierre "Uncle Ro" Manuel — Management
- Idris "Peeda Pan" Wahid — Management

== Charts ==
Part 1

Chart (2015)	Peak position
US Billboard 200	131
US Top R&B/Hip-Hop Albums (Billboard)	13
US Top Rap Albums (Billboard)	9

Part 2

Chart (2015)	Peak position
US Billboard 200	104
US Top R&B/Hip-Hop Albums (Billboard)	18
US Top Rap Albums (Billboard)	14

== Release history ==
List of release dates, showing region, formats, label, editions and reference

Region	Date	Format(s)	Label	Edition(s)	Ref.
United States	August 3, 2015	Digital download	Filmon Music, RBC Records	Standard	
United States	September 18, 2015	Digital download, CD	FilmOn, RBC Records	Standard	
