= Chief Keef =

American rapper (born 1995)

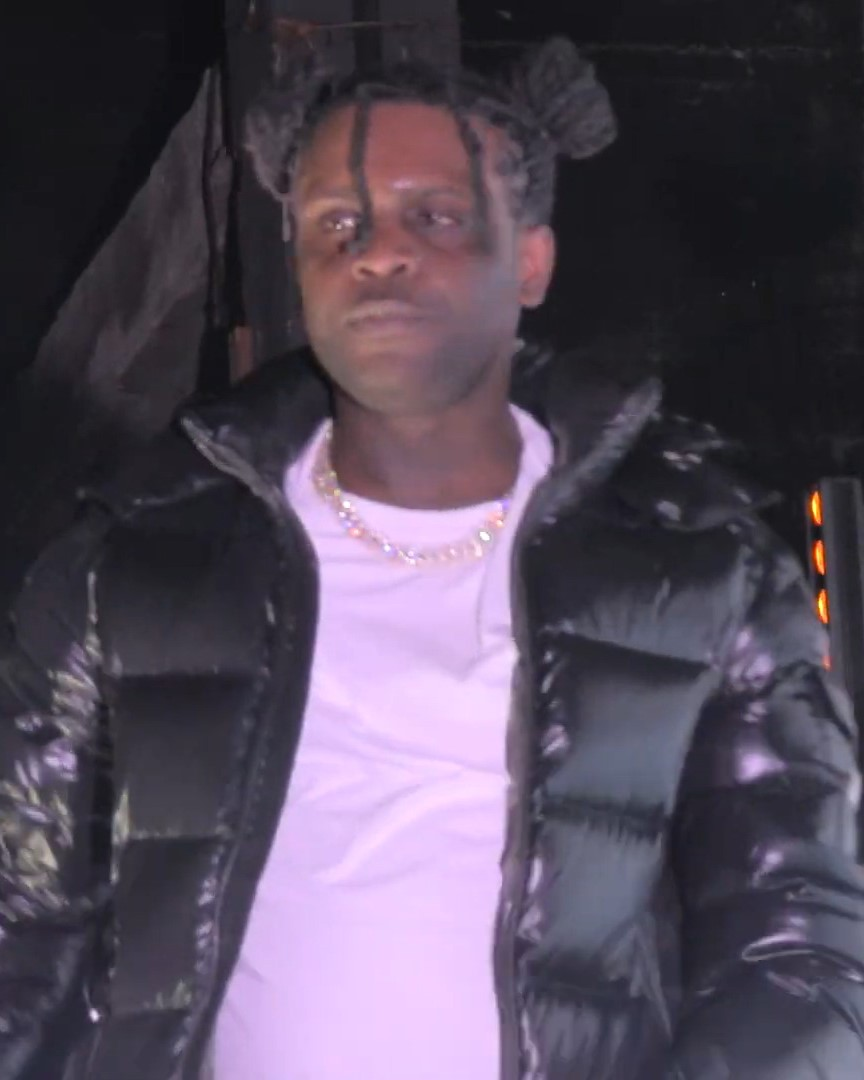
- Chief Keef in 2019

Background information
- Also known as: Sosa; BigGucci Sosa; Almighty So; Turbo; Otto
- Born: Keith Farrelle Cozart; August 15, 1995 (age 31); Chicago, Illinois, U.S.
- Genres: Hip-hop; drill; gangsta rap
- Occupations: Rapper; singer; songwriter; record producer
- Instrument: Vocals
- Works: Discography; production
- Years active: 2008–present
- Labels: 43B; E1; RBC; BMG; FilmOn Music; Fontana; Glo Gang; 1017 Brick Squad; Interscope
- Member of: Glory Boyz
- Children: 9

Logo
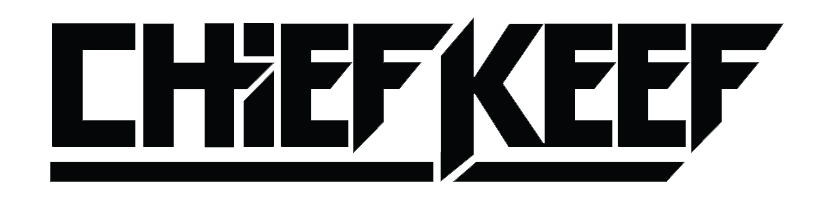

Keith Farrelle Cozart (born August 15, 1995), known professionally as Chief Keef, is an American rapper and record producer. Beginning his career as a teenager, he gained regional recognition for his mixtapes in the early 2010s. Cozart has since been credited with popularizing the hip hop subgenre drill among mainstream audiences and is considered a pioneer of the genre.

His fifth mixtape, Back from the Dead (2012), spawned the single "I Don't Like" (featuring Lil Reese), which became his first entry on the US Billboard Hot 100. A bidding war among several major labels led to Cozart signing with Interscope Records, which commercially re-released the song alongside its follow-up, "Love Sosa"; the latter received quintuple platinum certification from the Recording Industry Association of America (RIAA). Both served as lead singles for his debut studio album, Finally Rich (2012), which received moderate critical and commercial reception, and remains his only release on a major label.

His subsequent studio albums—Bang 3 (2015), Bang 3, Pt. 2 (2015), 4Nem (2021), and Almighty So 2 (2024)—each entered the Billboard 200 as independent releases. He has also achieved two top-40 entries on the Billboard Hot 100 through guest appearances on Lil Uzi Vert's 2020 song "Bean (Kobe)" and Drake's 2023 song "All the Parties".

== Early life, family and education ==
Keith Farrelle Cozart was born in Chicago, Illinois, on August 15, 1995, to Lolita Carter (born c. 1980) who was unwed. He is named after his deceased uncle, Keith Carter, who was known as Big Keef. He lived at the Parkway Garden Homes located in the Washington Park neighborhood on the city's South Side, a stronghold for the Black Disciples street gang of which Chief Keef is a member. Sociologist R. L'Heureux Lewis-McCoy described Chief Keef's mentality as a member, "Chicago’s Black Disciples is central to who he is and who he should be".

Chief Keef has been estranged from his biological father, Alfonso Cozart, since he was a year old. His legal guardian was his grandmother, Margaret Carter with whom he lived in Chicago. She worked as a school bus driver. He began rapping as a five-year-old using his mother's karaoke machine and tapes to record his music. During his childhood, Chief Keef attended Dulles Elementary School and Dyett High School, dropping out of the latter in his freshman year.

== Career ==
=== Early years, Finally Rich, and subsequent mixtapes (2011–2013) ===
Chief Keef started rapping in 2008 and released his debut mixtape, UF Overload, in 2009. In 2011, he first attracted local attention from Chicago's South Side community with his mixtapes, The Glory Road and Bang. In December, he was arrested for firing a gun from his car in Chicago's Washington Park neighborhood; he was placed under house arrest at his grandmother's residence for 30 days, followed by another 30 days of home confinement. While under house arrest, he posted several videos to his YouTube account, forerunners to Chicago's hip hop subgenre, drill.

Chief Keef met Japanese immigrant producer, DJ Kenn, through his uncle. DJ Kenn worked with Chief Keef on many of his earliest songs, and was involved with the 'Glory Boys Entertainment' (GBE) collective. Keef's first music video appearance was in April 2011 as a feature on fellow Chicago drill rapper S. Dot's music video for his remix of Ace Hood's song Hustle Hard.

Chief Keef's song "I Don't Like" became a hit in Chicago. A local party promoter called it "the perfect Chicago song because 'niggas just hate everything out here'". It caught Kanye West's attention, and he remixed the song with rappers Pusha T, Jadakiss and Big Sean. As a result, Keef "suddenly shot up out of obscurity".

In the summer of 2012, Chief Keef was the subject of a bidding war among record labels wishing to sign him, including Young Jeezy's CTE World. While 2012 proved to be a relatively quiet year in terms of his musical output, Chief Keef began the year by signing with Interscope Records. In a separate deal, he was promised his own label imprint, Glory Boyz Entertainment (GBE). The deal was worth $6,000,000 over a three album layout, with an additional $440,000 advance to establish GBE.

The deal gave Interscope the right to pull out of the contract if Chief Keef's debut album Finally Rich, released on December 18, 2012, had failed to sell 250,000 copies by December 2013. Featured guests on the album include rappers: 50 Cent, Wiz Khalifa, Young Jeezy, Rick Ross and his fellow Glory Boyz member Lil Reese. In May 2013 he signed with 1017 Brick Squad Records.

Chief Keef is featured on "Hold My Liquor", the fifth track on Kanye West's album, Yeezus, released on June 18, 2013. Keef's contributions to the track were praised by musician Lou Reed who said, "'Hold My Liquor' is just heartbreaking, and particularly coming from where it's coming from – listen to that incredibly poignant hook from a tough guy like Chief Keef, wow."

On his 18th birthday, August 15, 2013, Chief Keef celebrated by releasing the mixtape Bang, Pt. 2. It was highly anticipated as the first project following his debut album, but received a mixed to negative critical response. On October 12, 2013, another mixtape, Almighty So, was released. Like Bang, Pt. 2, Almighty So also received mixed to negative critical reviews. After serving his October 2013 jail term (see § Legal issues), he began working on his second studio album and a biopic.

=== Nobody and Bang 3 (2014–2016) ===
Chief Keef began experimenting with producing his music in 2014. Meaghan Garvey of The Fader noted this was fitting as the rapper has "always been more concerned with vibe than meaning, and production is his most efficient tool to create a mood without getting bogged down by pesky syntax." In January, Chief Keef announced he was working on a new mixtape, Bang 3. In February, he unveiled the cover art to his upcoming mixtape, Back From The Dead 2, the sequel to his critically acclaimed mixtape, Back From The Dead. During February, Chief Keef said his former lean addiction and bad mixing contributed to the lack of quality music on his two mixtape projects Bang Pt. 2 and Almighty So and that he was disappointed in both projects.

Later in February 2014, he announced an EP, Bang 4, before his second studio album Bang 3, as a preview. The following day, Fredo Santana announced he and Chief Keef were going to release an album collaboration. In March, Keef released "Fuck Rehab", the first official single from Bang 3,?featuring his fellow Glo Gang artist and cousin Mario "Blood Money" Hess. This marked Hess's final recording before his death on April 9, 2014. On March 14 Chief Keef released the official music video for "Fuck Rehab". Although Interscope executive Larry Jackson announced that Bang 3 would be released on June 10, it was delayed again.

In October 2014, Chief Keef was dropped by Interscope Records. He confirmed via Twitter that every project he had planned, including the release of the long-awaited Bang 3, would still be released. Young Chop criticized Interscope's decision to drop Chief Keef. Despite being set for a December 2014 release, Bang 3 did not materialize. Chief Keef's mixtapes, Mansion Musick set for a November 28 release, and Thot Breakers set to release on February 14, 2015, were not released as announced. However, he was successful in releasing Big Gucci Sosa, a 12-track collaborative mixtape, with Gucci Mane, as well as Back from the Dead 2, which was made available for digital download from iTunes.

Chief Keef self-produced 16 of the 20 songs on the mixtape. David Drake of Pitchfork Media said, "For his first steps into the rapper-producer territory, he shows promise—though it's tough to imagine most of these beats working outside the context of a Chief Keef album, as they are primed to frame his vocals." Rolling Stone ranked the mixtape 25th on its list of the 40 best rap albums of 2014 commenting, "The bleak world from which he came still shapes his sound; it's a bleak and lonely record, with few guests and a darkly psychedelic shape formed by drugs and likely PTSD. Yet he finds a gleeful humanity inside the world's rotten core, with bluntly potent, economical rapping that gets strong mileage per word."

In November, he announced Nobody, a "Glo Producer album" that featured guest vocals by Kanye West and Tadoe. It was set to be released on December 2, but appeared on December 16. The album's title track was noted for being one of Keef's more emotionally driven tracks. Chris Coplan of Consequence of Sound wrote "the track itself feels like the apex of a night spent binge-drinking." The album was awarded a 7.0/10 score by Pitchfork Media's Meaghan Garvey.

On February 18, 2015, Chief Keef released Sorry 4 the Weight, a 20-track mixtape. Elliott Pearson of The Alibi commented: "Sorry 4 the Weight is another consistent chapter in the rapper's singular Midwestern gothic repertoire, and if 'What Up' is any indication, he's made serious progress as a beat-maker too." The mixtape was largely a solo effort, featuring only Andy Milonakis and Glo Gang labelmate, Benji Glo. In 2015, his track "Faneto" was slowly building momentum since its October 2014 release. On April 24, 2015, Chief Keef announced his next album, titled The Cozart, saying it would be released soon. In 2015, he signed with FilmOn, a television streaming company owned by Greek billionaire Alki David in 2015. Keef later named his son Sno FilmOn Dot Com Cozart to promoteBang 3, but the label retracted their naming rights to his son.

On July 11, 2015, Capo (legal name Marvin Carr), a longtime member of Chief Keef's Glo Gang label, was shot and killed in a drive-by shooting in Chicago. After killing Capo, the driver of the vehicle reportedly struck a stroller holding 13-month-old Dillan Harris, killing him instantly. Chief Keef announced on Twitter he would be holding a free benefit concert as a tribute to Capo and encouraged concertgoers to donate to the Harris family. He also announced the formation of the Stop the Violence Now Foundation, in an attempt to decrease crime in Chicago. Because of outstanding warrants in Illinois, Keef was scheduled to attend the concert via hologram from a sound stage in Beverly Hills, California.

The concert, organized by HologramUSA and FilmOn Music, was planned to be held in Chicago's Redmoon Theater. It faced a series of delays after Chicago mayor Rahm Emanuel's office claimed Chief Keef was "an unacceptable role model" and that his music promoted violence. Chief Keef's representatives then worked out an arrangement with promoters of Craze Fest in Hammond, Indiana, to hold the concert there. Local police stopped Keef from performing again. Chief Keef's hologram made a plea for peace in Chicago saying, "Stop the violence, stop nonsense, stop the killing. Let the kids grow up", before performing "I Don't Like". Fearing the concert was a threat to public safety, Hammond mayor Thomas McDermott, Jr. had the city's police department shut down the generators powering Chief Keef's hologram. McDermott was quoted as saying, "I know nothing about Chief Keef. All I'd heard was he has a lot of songs about gangs and shooting people—a history that's anti-cop, pro-gang and pro-drug use. He's been basically outlawed in Chicago, and we're not going to let [him] circumvent Mayor Emanuel by going next door." Chicago Tribune columnist Eric Zorn criticized Emmanuel and Hammond for their decisions, claiming they infringed upon Chief Keef's First Amendment rights.

In November, Keef's contract with FilmOn was suspended over management issues. The following month, FilmOn sued Keef's management team and producers for the unauthorized release of music.

=== Dedication, Glotoven and Almighty So 2 (since 2016) ===
In March 2016, Chief Keef tweeted that he was retiring from rapping. The announcement came as his recorded output was slowing down. However, later in the year he was featured on MGK's song, "Young Man". He also released a 17-track mixtape Two Zero One Seven in January 2017. Chief Keef joined a long line of rappers, including Jay-Z, Lupe Fiasco, Nicki Minaj and others, who claimed to have retired only to return to making music.

Chief Keef released four mixtapes in the lead up to releasing his third album, Dedication, on December 1, 2017. The Guardian called Dedication his "most satisfying album to date".

In 2018, Chief Keef was able to drop more mixtapes, such as Mansion Musick and Back from the Dead 3 and more mixtapes in The Leek series. He also did more features for musicians such as Playboi Carti, Soulja Boy, and G Herbo. Chief Keef also worked alongside Trippie Redd due to the feud he had with 6ix9ine.

In early 2019, Chief Keef and Zaytoven worked together in the studio. Chief Keef later confirmed they were making a collaborative mixtape called Glotoven. It was released on March 15, 2019, and was supported by the single "Spy Kid". On April 20, 2019, Chief Keef revealed he had another mixtape planned, dubbed Almighty So 2. He then released a song with Youngboy Never Broke Again called "Fireman". The mixtape is also scheduled to have features from Lil Uzi Vert, Soulja Boy and Lil Reese, among others. Chief Keef also released another single titled "Boost".

In March 2020, Chief Keef earned his first major production credit on Lil Uzi Vert's second studio album, Eternal Atake, with the song "Chrome Heart Tags". Chief Keef was later featured on Uzi's album Lil Uzi Vert vs. the World 2 with a vocal performance on the song "Bean (Kobe)", which became his highest-charting song on the Hot 100 at number 19. In 2026, he was featured on a remix of Katy Perry's 2013 song "Legendary Lovers", which Keef had sampled in his 2014 song "Save Me". He released his mixtape Skeletor in April 2026. He is scheduled to embark on a tour in support of the mixtape in the autumn of 2026.

== Other ventures ==
=== Glo Gang ===
Glo Gang
- Parent company: Entertainment One
- Founded: 2014
- Founder: Chief Keef
- Status: Dormant
- Distributor: E1 Music
- Genre: Hip-hop, midwest hip hop
- Country of origin: United States
- Location: Chicago, Illinois; Los Angeles, California
- Official website: glogangworldwide.com

As part of his contract with Interscope Records, Chief Keef's label imprint, Glory Boyz Entertainment (GBE), was established. He and his manager, Rovan Manuel, each owned 40% of GBE's shares. Chief Keef's cousin and fellow rapper, Fredo Santana, his uncle Alonzo Carter, and Anthony H. Dade, owned the remaining 20% of GBE. Various associates would be signed with the label, such as rappers Lil Reese, Fredo Santana and producer Young Chop.

The label had been active since 2011 but had only released mixtapes and was not a fully functioning record company. After releasing Chief Keef's Finally Rich in December 2012, the label was set to release an album by Lil Reese in the following months, along with various mixtapes. However, on January 3, 2014, Chief Keef said that Glory Boyz Entertainment was "no more", and he was starting a new record label named Glo Gang. Prior to his death, Blood Money revealed in an interview the members of Glo Gang were Chief Keef, Tray Savage, Ballout, Capo, Tadoe, JusGlo, and himself.

==== Current artists ====
- Chief Keef
- Tadoe
- Ballout
- DooWop
- Lil Flash
- Benji Flo
- Terintino
- JusGlo
- SmokeCamp Chino

==== Former artists ====
- Lil Reese
- Lucki
- Tray Savage (deceased)
- Fredo Santana (deceased)
- Gino Marley
- Capo (deceased)
- Blood Money (deceased)
- SD
- Snap Dogg
- Rocaine

=== 43B ===
43B
- Parent company: BMG, RBC
- Founded: 2022
- Founder: Chief Keef
- Status: Active
- Distributor: BMG
- Genre: Hip-hop
- Country of origin: United States
- Location: Chicago, Illinois; Los Angeles, California

Announced on June 6, 2022, through a partnership with RBC Records and BMG Rights Management, Chief Keef announced the founding of 43B, otherwise known as Forget Everybody, and its first signee, Lil Gnar.

"43B has been a passion project of mine for over a year and I’m ready to give artists that are changing the game a label where they can really succeed, I’ve been independent for almost 10 years, so I want to pass on my knowledge of the industry to artists who are shifting the culture so they can make it to the top."

— Chief Keef

== Personal life ==
At the age of 16, Chief Keef had his first child, a daughter. In November 2013, DNA documents revealed that he had fathered a 10-month-old daughter to a woman two decades older than him. Chief Keef was subsequently ordered to begin paying child support to her mother. In September 2014, Chief Keef announced the birth of his third child, who was his first son.

In May 2015, he was sued by another woman who claimed he is the father of her child. Since he had failed to respond to the legal documents with which he was served, he was ordered to appear in court. After failing to do so, a bench warrant was issued for his arrest. Despite these issues, LA Weekly reported that at least on Instagram Chief Keef "appears to take fatherhood seriously."

On September 15, 2012, Chief Keef uploaded a photograph of him receiving fellatio from a female fan onto Instagram, which he removed shortly afterwards. However, his account was subsequently banned for violating Instagram's terms of service. He has since created another Instagram account, and has had his activities on the app mentioned by various outlets.

In August 2015, he caused a controversy after naming his newborn son Sno "FilmOn Dot Com", inspired by his record label, FilmOn Music, to promote his album Bang 3. Following a dispute over the child's paternity, FilmOn Music retracted the name until the matter is settled.

Two of his cousins, Fredo Santana and Tadoe, were signed to his Glory Boyz Entertainment label. His step-brother was shot dead on January 2, 2013. Another of his cousins, Mario Hess, also known as Big Glo, who performed under the stage name Blood Money, was shot and killed in Chicago's Englewood neighborhood on April 9, 2014. Hess had been signed to Interscope Records just two weeks prior to his killing. In an interview with Billboard, Chief Keef explained how Big Glo's death influenced his life saying, "When that happened that was the biggest lesson. It told me 'You gotta grow up.'"

After being evicted from his Highland Park home in June 2014, he relocated to Los Angeles. In an interview with Noisey's Rebecca Haithcoat, Chief Keef told her his favorite part about Los Angeles is "the quiet". After moving to Los Angeles, he began indulging in his new-found hobby of art collecting, once he discovered the paintings of art teacher Bill da Butcher while in rehab. Once acquainted, da Butcher began working on paintings personally meant for Chief Keef. He believed that his move to Los Angeles benefited him; in an interview with Billboard, he said: "I got away from all the unnecessary trouble. It's better out here [in L.A.] than in Chicago, because I got in so much trouble. I like living out here. I think it improved me. It changed me, and [inspired] me to go somewhere bigger."

=== Legal issues ===
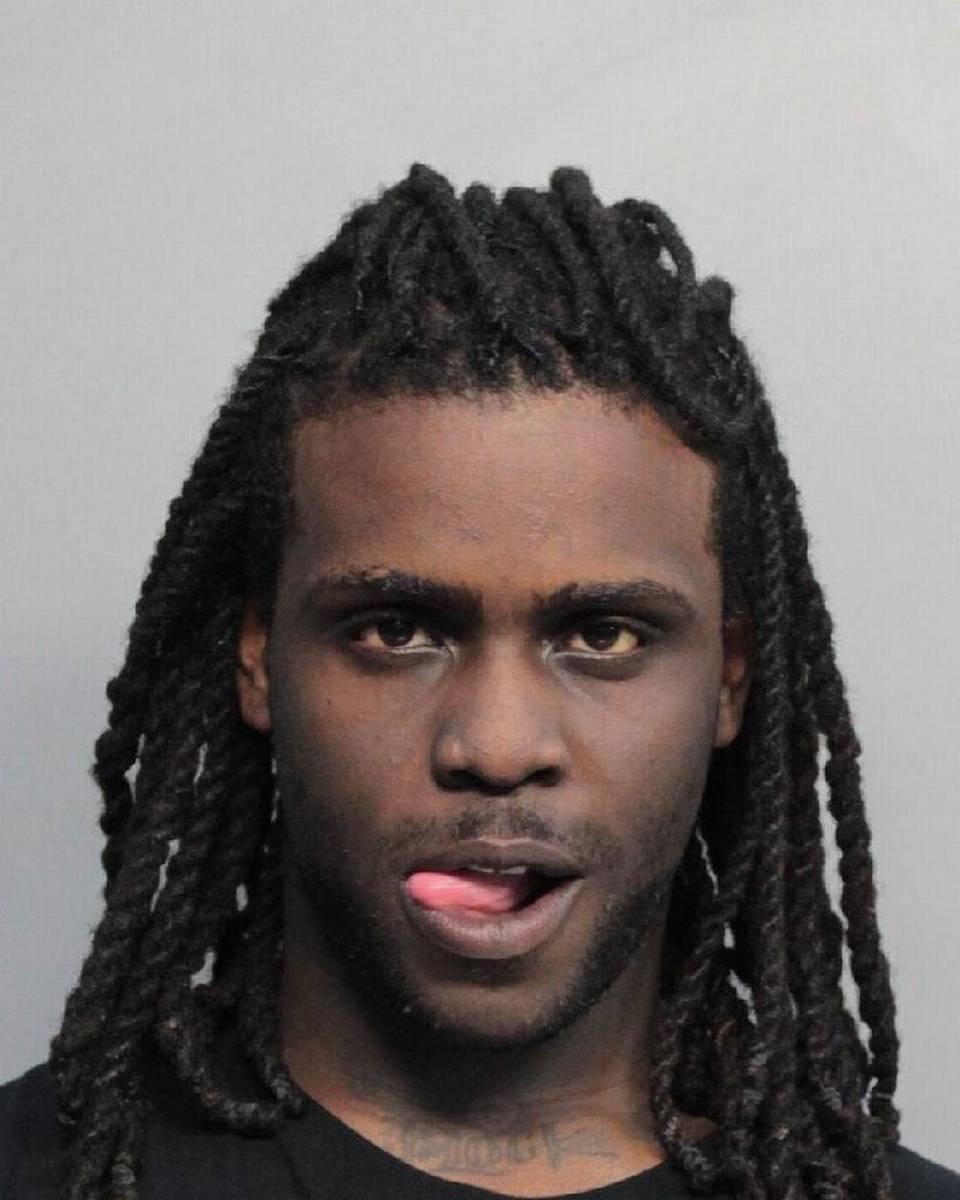
Chief Keef's 2017 mugshot after his arrest in Miami Beach

On January 27, 2011, Chief Keef was apprehended on charges of heroin manufacture and distribution. As a juvenile offender, he was determined to be a "delinquent", rather than guilty of his charges, and served time under house arrest. In December 2011, he left his grandmother's home holding a coat over his hands in front of his waistband. A policeman stopped to question the rapper. He dropped the coat, flashed a handgun and ran away.

Officers chased the then-16-year-old Chief Keef, who turned around several times and pointed the gun at them. The policemen "discharged their weapons" but missed. They caught him and recovered the loaded pistol. Chief Keef was charged with three counts of aggravated assault with a firearm on a police officer and aggravated unlawful use of a weapon. He was also given a misdemeanor charge for resisting arrest. He was held in the Cook County Juvenile Detention Center for four weeks until a judge sentenced him to house arrest at his grandmother's house.

On September 5, 2012, Chicago Police stated Chief Keef was being investigated for a possible connection to the shooting death of fellow rapper and Englewood resident, Joseph Coleman, who performed under the stage name "Lil JoJo". This began after Chief Keef had mocked his death on Twitter, which he later claimed was the result of his account being hacked. Coleman's mother has openly maintained Chief Keef paid to have her son killed.

Cook County prosecutors asked a judge to remand him to juvenile detention for alleged parole violations on October 17, 2012. This was in response to a video interview he held at a shooting range which included footage of him discharging a firearm. A hearing was set for November 20, 2012, which was subsequently delayed and moved up to January 15, 2013. The court ordered Pitchfork Media, which had posted the now removed video, to provide the interview's footage.

On December 31, 2012, Chief Keef was issued a judicial summons for a new and unrelated alleged parole violation. Prosecutors claimed he failed to notify his juvenile parole officer of a change of address. A hearing was set for January 2, 2013. Although prosecutors requested that he be jailed, Cook County judge Carl Anthony Walker allowed him to remain free, saying he had not been presented with "any credible evidence" to warrant incarceration.

Chief Keef was taken into custody on January 15, 2013, after a juvenile court judge ruled that the gun range interview video constituted a probation violation. Two days later, he was sentenced to two months in a juvenile detention facility and was made a ward of the state. He was released on March 14, 2013. On January 17, 2013, Chief Keef was sued by Washington, D.C.–based promotion company Team Major for $75,000 for a missed show. According to the firm, he was supposed to perform at the O2 Arena in London on December 29, 2012. He did not perform and neither he nor his label explained why he missed the date.

He ignored the lawsuit, and the court ordered him to pay $230,019 damages to Team Major by default. He was arrested in an upscale hotel in DeKalb County, Georgia, for smoking marijuana in public and for disorderly conduct on May 20, 2013. He was released later in the day. Eight days later, Chief Keef was arrested for driving 110 mph in a 55 mph zone in his hometown of Chicago, and for driving with an unlawful number of passengers. He was later released on bond.

He returned to court on June 17 and pleaded guilty to speeding. He was ordered to pay a $531 fine, serve 18 months of probation, complete 60 hours of community service and undergo random drug tests. On October 15, 2013, Keef returned to jail for a 20-day sentence for a probation violation after testing positive for marijuana. On October 24, 2013, he was released early for good behavior. However, on November 6, 2013, Chief Keef was jailed on another probation violation.

Following a stint in rehab under probation orders, Chief Keef was arrested on March 5, 2014, in Highland Park, Illinois, for driving under the influence of marijuana, driving on a suspended license and was cited for having no proof of insurance. On February 4, 2014, Kim Productions filed suit against him to recover losses they allege were incurred after he failed to appear at a RapCure benefit concert in Cleveland, Ohio, in June 2013. The suit alleges that Kim Productions provided him with a $15,000 deposit for the performance. The lawsuit also alleges that as a result of his failure to appear, the concert had to be cancelled.

In June 2014, Chief Keef was evicted from his Highland Park home. Although Bal Bansal, the owner of the house, maintained he was a good tenant and that his departure from the home was voluntary, police confirmed it was an eviction.

In January 2017, Chief Keef was arrested for allegedly beating up and robbing a producer by the name of Ramsay Tha Great. He claimed that Chief Keef stole his Rolex watch and pointed firearms at him. These charges were dropped for lack of evidence. In April 2017, Chief Keef was arrested in Miami Beach, Florida after witnesses said that a passenger jumped out of Keef's car before allegedly handing someone a bag containing a "green leafy substance," causing police to pull Keef over and search his vehicle, where they would find a cup of sizzurp, leading to him being charged with a DUI. Chief Keef was arrested in South Dakota for smoking cannabis and possession of drug paraphernalia in June 2017, and was released on bond the next day. In April 2019 he pleaded no contest and was given a suspended sentence.

== Image ==
Chief Keef is often seen as a representation of the "Chiraq" gangsta rap culture that is present in Chicago. He often refers to himself as "Sosa" as do his peers and the media. The nickname "Sosa" is a reference to Alejandro Sosa, the drug kingpin in the movie Scarface. LA Weekly reported that Chief Keef's Glo Gang entourage respects the rapper. One member of the Glo Gang, Ballout, stated, "We learned all that from Sosa, we be in the studio with him so much", calling him, "a rhyming machine. A music genius. Black Justin Bieber, if you ask me."

The New York Times stated that Chief Keef "symbolizes" Chicago's drill music scene and is the "best known of the young generation of Chicago rappers." In November 2012, Lucy Stehlik of The Guardian described Chief Keef as drill's "alpha male". David Drake of Pitchfork Media wrote, "Chief Keef is in rarefied air for street rap—a creative voice with an original, cohesive aesthetic", adding, "to the grassroots, among a new generation of stars, he sits at street rap's aesthetic center, not its margins."

A New York Times article compared Chief Keef to 50 Cent, noting that, like him, Chief Keef makes thuggery, "a major part of his early-career persona." Lupe Fiasco, who has been involved in a controversy with him, has been referred to as an "antagonist" to Chief Keef's more gangsta-rap persona. The New York Times writes, "Lupe Fiasco is a stern and didactic teacher, but it's arguable that Chief Keef's music is far better at ringing warning bells." Another rapper, Common, has praised his contributions to rap saying, "I think Chief Keef brought something that nobody else was doing and he brought it raw. He brought it real. With that, I have to respect that as an artist that he has come and brought that."

Other rappers, such as Rhymefest and Lupe Fiasco, however, have been critical of Chief Keef. In June 2012, Rhymefest authored a blog post critical of his image and message, describing him as a "bomb" and a "spokesman for the Prison Industrial Complex". The post was also critical of rappers Waka Flocka Flame and Rick Ross, citing similar issues. Rhymefest reiterated these views in a subsequent interview with Salon. Lupe Fiasco's criticisms of Keef touched off a feud between the two.

== Legacy ==
Many publications have referred to Chief Keef as an influential figure in contemporary hip-hop, for both his musical style and gangster image. His melodic style of rapping and his characteristically slurred delivery of lyrics has been called the catalyst for the success of Chicago drill and mumble rap, and an influence on fellow rappers such as 21 Savage, YoungBoy Never Broke Again, Lil Uzi Vert, Playboi Carti, Lil Pump, XXXTentacion, Ski Mask the Slump God, Trippie Redd, Juice Wrld, Polo G, and Tay-K, among others, as well as pop artists Doja Cat and Billie Eilish. Additionally, Chief Keef's heavy use of adlibs, specifically the word "aye" as a large part of a song was a major influence on the Soundcloud rap subgenre and the artists that emerged from it. Rolling Stone has credited Cozart with "personif[ying] Chicago drill", while Stereogum referred to him as a "modern rap folk hero".

In 2023, boxer Gervonta Davis walked out with Chief Keef to his song "Love Sosa" for his fight against Ryan Garcia.

Chief Keef is credited with popularizing the phrases "glow up" and "smoking [opps]", although the lyrical origin of the latter can be traced back to fellow Chicago drill rapper RondoNumbaNine in his 2013 song "Hang Wit Me". Additionally, Chief Keef popularized the slang term "thot".

Chief Keef is one of the most prominent Black Disciples members of his generation.

== Hip hop feuds ==
In an August 2012 interview with Baltimore radio station 92Q Jams (WERQ-FM), Lupe Fiasco stated that Chief Keef "scares" him and described him as a "hoodlum" and a representative of Chicago's "skyrocketing" murder rate. A tweet from Chief Keef's account threatening Fiasco was posted on September 5. Chief Keef claimed that his account had been hacked and the tweet was not his. On September 13, 2012, Fiasco released a video interview in which he made amends to Chief Keef.

In November 2014, rap group Migos and Glo Gang member, Capo, were involved in a physical altercation in a Chicago restaurant. Later, Chief Keef uploaded an image onto Instagram featuring an alleged stolen chain belonging to rapper Quavo of Migos. Though this incident escalated the already existing tension between the two groups' members, the feud seemingly ended.

Chief Keef was involved in a feud with rapper 6ix9ine in May 2018. This stemmed from Tadoe's domestic abuse and relationship issues relating to fellow rapper Cuban Doll. She was in a relationship with Tadoe but also friendly with 6ix9ine. 6ix9ine then dissed Chief Keef and rapper Lil Reese on social media posting a video of his semi-romantic vacation to Hawaii with Cuban Doll to Instagram, and driving up to Chief Keef's old neighborhood and taunting him. 6ix9ine also contacted Aereon Clark, known professionally as Slim Danger, the mother of one of Chief Keef's sons and recorded himself buying her designer clothes, verbally taunting Chief Keef and later receiving fellatio from her.

On May 8, 2018, Trippie Redd previewed the song "I Kill People" on Instagram, featuring Chief Keef and Tadoe, which was aimed as a diss toward 6ix9ine and Cuban Doll. On June 2, 2018, Chief Keef was fired upon outside the W Hotel in New York City. He was not hit and there were no injuries from the incident. Due to the ongoing feud, 6ix9ine was confirmed to be under investigation by the New York Police Department for possible involvement in the incident despite being in Los Angeles at the time. In February 2019, 6ix9ine pleaded guilty to ordering the shooting of Chief Keef. He had offered his associate Kintea "Kooda B" McKenzie $20,000 to shoot at Cozart. 6ix9ine was later found to be an informant for the U.S. Government helping to lock up Kooda B, and his manager Kifano "Shotti" Jordan.

== Discography ==
Solo studio albums

- Finally Rich (2012)
- Bang 3 (2015)
- Dedication (2017)
- 4Nem (2021)
- Almighty So 2 (2024)
- Skeletor (2026)

Collaborative albums

- Nobody (with 12Hunna) (2014)
