= Teyana Taylor discography =

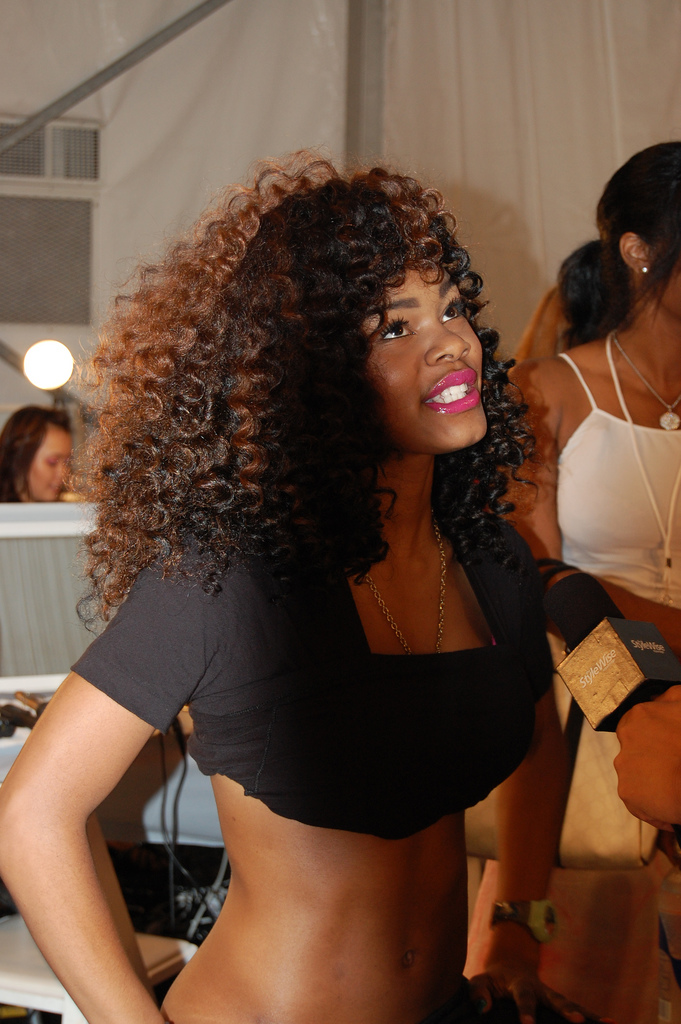
- Taylor backstage at a Diesel fashion show in 2008
- Studio albums: 4
- Compilation albums: 1
- Singles: 16
- Mixtapes: 3

American singer Teyana Taylor has released four studio albums, one compilation album, three mixtapes, and sixteen singles (including four as a featured artist and two promotional singles). In 2009, Taylor released her first mixtape, From a Planet Called Harlem, which included her debut single "Google Me". It debuted at its peak of number ninety on the US Hot R&B/Hip-Hop Songs chart. Around this time, Taylor featured on songs with the likes of Trey Songz, Missy Elliott, and Kanye West. Taylor has spoken about her inspiration from fellow female musician Lauryn Hill, which was noted with the release of her second mixtape in 2012. The mixtape, entitled The Misunderstanding of Teyana Taylor, takes its name from Hill's album The Miseducation of Lauryn Hill.

Later that year, Taylor contributed to her labels compilation album, Cruel Summer. The album went on to debut at number two on the Billboard 200, while it topped both the Top R&B/Hip-Hop Albums and Rap Albums charts. One of her contributions to the album, "To the World", peaked at seventy on the Billboard Hot 100, ninety-two on the Canadian Hot 100, and ninety-four on the UK Singles Chart. On November 4, 2014, Taylor released her debut studio album, titled VII. The album debuted on the Billboard 200 at number nineteen, and topped the Top R&B/Hip-Hop Albums and R&B Albums chart. VII spawned two singles. The first, "Maybe", featured Pusha T and Yo Gotti, and peaked at number thirteen on the Billboard Bubbling Under Hot 100 Singles chart. The second single from the album was titled "Do Not Disturb", and featured fellow R&B singer Chris Brown. In 2015, Taylor released her third free-download mixtape, The Cassette Tape 1994.

On June 23, 2018, Taylor released her second studio album K.T.S.E., short for Keep That Same Energy, the last of five similarly brief GOOD Music projects overseen and co-produced by Kanye West in Wyoming. It debuted at number seventeen and yielded the Gold-certified singles "Gonna Love Me" and "Issues/Hold On". After a few preview tracks scattered across 2019 and the first half of 2020, most notably the Gold-certified single "How You Want It?," she delivered The Album on Juneteenth of the latter year. It secured her second number one on Billboard's Top R&B Albums and first top ten on the Billboard 200 chart.

== Albums ==
=== Studio albums ===
List of studio albums, with selected details, chart positions and sales figures
Title	Details	Peak chart positions									Sales	Certifications
Title	Details	US	US R&B /HH	US R&B	BEL (FL)	CAN	NLD	NZ Heat.	UK	UK R&B	Sales	Certifications
VII	Released: November 4, 2014; Label: GOOD, Def Jam; Formats: CD, digital download, streaming	19	1	1	—	—	—	—	—	37	US: 24,000 (Note: Sales of VII in the United States as of November 2014.)	
K.T.S.E.	Released: June 22, 2018; Label: GOOD, Def Jam; Formats: CD, LP, digital download, streaming	17	10	2	125	61	77	3	57	8	US: 23,000 (First week)	RIAA: Gold; RMNZ: Gold
The Album	Released: June 19, 2020; Label: GOOD, Def Jam; Formats: Digital download, streaming, LP	8	6	1	—	72	—	—	76	12	US: 32,000 (First week)	RIAA: Gold
Escape Room	Released: August 22, 2025; Label: Def Jam; Formats: Digital download, streaming	67	17	6	—	—	—	—	—	—	US: 14,500 (First week)	
"—" denotes a recording that did not chart or was not released in that territory.

=== Compilation albums ===
List of compilation albums, with selected details, chart positions and sales figures
Title	Details	Peak chart positions								Sales
Title	Details	US	US R&B/ HH	US Rap	AUS	CAN	FRA	SWI Comp.	UK Comp.	Sales
Cruel Summer (with GOOD Music)	Released: September 18, 2012; Label: GOOD, Def Jam; Format: CD, digital download	2	1	1	7	4	30	10	2	US: 340,000 (Note: Sales of Cruel Summer in the United States as of November 2012.)

== Mixtapes ==
List of mixtapes, showing selected details
Title	Details
From a Planet Called Harlem	Released: August 16, 2009; Label: Star Trak; Format: Digital download
The Misunderstanding of Teyana Taylor	Released: March 12, 2012; Label: Self-released; Format: Digital download
The Cassette Tape 1994	Released: August 25, 2015; Label: Self-released; Format: Digital download

== Singles ==
=== As lead artist ===
List of singles as lead artist, with selected details and chart positions
Title	Year	Peak chart positions				Certifications	Album
Title	Year	US Bub.	US R&B/ HH	US R&B	NZ Hot	Certifications	Album
"Google Me"	2008	—	90	—	—		From a Planet Called Harlem
"Maybe" (featuring Yo Gotti and Pusha T)	2014	10	32	11	—	RIAA: Gold	VII
"Do Not Disturb" (featuring Chris Brown)	2014	—	— (Note: "Do Not Disturb" did not enter the Billboard Hot R&B/Hip-Hop Songs chart, but peaked at number 43 on the R&B/Hip-Hop Digital Song Sales chart.)	— (Note: "Do Not Disturb" did not enter the Billboard Hot R&B Songs chart, but peaked at number 17 on the R&B Digital Song Sales chart.)	—	RIAA: Gold	VII
"Gonna Love Me" (solo or remix featuring Ghostface Killah, Method Man, and Raekwon)	2018	16	19	10	—	RIAA: 2× Platinum; BPI: Silver; RMNZ: Platinum	K.T.S.E.
"Issues / Hold On"	2019	—	—	25	—	RIAA: Platinum; RMNZ: Gold	K.T.S.E.
"How You Want It?" (featuring King Combs)	2019	—	28	22	13	RIAA: Platinum; RMNZ: Platinum	The Album
"Morning" (with Kehlani)	2019	23	— (Note: "Morning" did not enter the Billboard Hot R&B/Hip-Hop Songs chart, but peaked at number nine on the Bubbling Under R&B/Hip-Hop Singles chart.)	15	27	RIAA: Gold	The Album
"We Got Love" (solo or featuring Lauryn Hill)	2019	—	—	—	33		The Album
"Made It"	2020	—	— (Note: "Made It" did not enter the Billboard Hot R&B/Hip-Hop Songs chart, but peaked at number 37 on the Mainstream R&B/Hip-Hop chart.)	—	—		The Album
"Wake Up Love" (featuring Iman)	2020	—	—	14	—	RIAA: Gold	The Album
"Long Time"	2025	—	—	20	—		Escape Room
"Bed of Roses"	2025	—	—	—	—		Escape Room
"—" denotes a recording that did not chart or was not released in that territory.

=== As featured artist ===
List of singles as featured artist, with selected details and chart positions
Title	Year	Peak chart positions			Album
Title	Year	US Bub.	US R&B/HH Bub.	NZ Hot	Album
"Christmas in Harlem" (Kanye West featuring Cyhi the Prynce and Teyana Taylor)	2010	13	3	—	Non-album singles
"Merk Out" (Young Marqus featuring Teyana Taylor)	2012	—	—	—	Non-album singles
"Ballin'" (Fat Joe featuring Wiz Khalifa and Teyana Taylor)	2013	—	—	—	Non-album singles
"F You I Love You" (Kyle featuring Teyana Taylor)	2019	—	—	34	Light of Mine
"Ecstasy" (Remix) (Ciara featuring Normani & Teyana Taylor)	2025	—	—	—	CiCi (Deluxe)
"—" denotes a recording that did not chart or was not released in that territory.

=== Promotional singles ===
List of promotional singles, with selected details
Title	Year	Certifications	Album
"Business"	2014		VII
"Bare wit Me"	2020	RIAA: Gold	The Album

== Other charted and certified songs ==
List of other charted songs, with selected details and chart positions
Title	Year	Peak chart positions								Certifications	Album
Title	Year	US	US R&B/ HH	US Rap	US R&B	US Dance	CAN	UK	UK R&B	Certifications	Album
"Dark Fantasy" (Kanye West featuring Teyana Taylor, Nicki Minaj, and Bon Iver)	2010	60	— (Note: "Dark Fantasy" did not enter the Billboard Hot R&B/Hip-Hop Songs chart, but peaked at number 10 on the Bubbling Under R&B/Hip-Hop Singles chart.)	— (Note: "Dark Fantasy" did not enter the Billboard Hot Rap Songs chart, but peaked at number 8 on the Rap Digital Songs chart.)	—	—	67	—	—	RIAA: Gold	My Beautiful Dark Twisted Fantasy
"To the World" (Kanye West and R. Kelly featuring Teyana Taylor)	2012	70	35	24	—	—	92	94	17		Cruel Summer
"Rose in Harlem"	2018	—	—	—	—	—	—	—	—	RIAA: Gold	K.T.S.E.
"WTP"	2018	—	—	—	—	19	—	—	—		K.T.S.E.
"Rich Nigga Lifestyle" (Rick Ross featuring Nipsey Hussle and Teyana Taylor)	2019	— (Note: "Rich Nigga Lifestyle" did not enter the Billboard Hot 100, but peaked at number 18 on the Bubbling Under Singles chart.)	—	—	—	—	—	—	—		Port of Miami 2
"Boomin'" (featuring Missy Elliott and Future)	2020	—	—	—	21	—	—	—	—		The Album
"—" denotes a recording that did not chart or was not released in that territory.

== Guest appearances ==
List of guest appearances, showing other artist(s), year released and album name
Title	Year	Other artist(s)	Album
"I Need a Girl (Remix)"	2009	Trey Songz, Fabolous	None
"Put it on Ya"	2009	Missy Elliott	None
"Dark Fantasy"	2010	Kanye West	My Beautiful Dark Twisted Fantasy
"Hell of a Life"	2010	Kanye West	My Beautiful Dark Twisted Fantasy
"Rock Wit Me"	2011	Jadakiss	I Love You (A Dedication to My Fans)
"Party Tonight"	2011	Jim Jones, Cam'ron	Nocturnal
"Bottles & Rockin' J's (Remix)"	2012	The Game, Busta Rhymes, Rick Ross, Fabolous, Lil Wayne	California Republic
"Never Let 'Em Stop Me"	2012	K Smith, Meek Mill	I Am Santiago
"To the World"	2012	Kanye West, R. Kelly	Cruel Summer
"Sin City"	2012	John Legend, Cyhi the Prynce, Malik Yusef, Travis Scott	Cruel Summer
"Bliss"	2012	John Legend	Cruel Summer
"Want You Back"	2012	Fabolous, Joe Budden	The S.O.U.L. Tape 2
"Hold You Down"	2012	Red Café	American Psycho
"Take My Breath Away"	2012	Brianna Perry	Symphony No. 9
"Made for Me"	2014	Sebastian Mikael	Speechless
"Limos"	2014	Vince Staples	Hell Can Wait
"Made It From Nothing"	2017	Meek Mill, Rick Ross	Wins & Losses
"Talk About It"	2017	Fabolous, Jadakiss	Friday on Elm Street
"You"	2018	T.I.	Dime Trap
"Home Body (Remix)"	2019	Lil Durk, Melii	Signed to the Streets 3
"Rich Nigga Lifestyle"	2019	Rick Ross, Nipsey Hussle	Port of Miami 2
"Gimme Love (Remix)"	2019	Seyi Shay	None
"Need a Sign"	2019	Dave East	Survival
"Us vs. The World"	2019	Fabolous, Chris Brown	Summertime Shootout 3: Coldest Summer Ever
"Machine"	2020	Miquela	Machine
"Closer to God"	2023	Diddy	The Love Album: Off the Grid
"4L"	2026	Latto	Big Mama

== Music videos ==
List of music videos, showing year released, other artists and directors
Title	Year	Other artist(s)	Director(s)
As lead artist
"Google Me"	2008	None	Diane Martel
"Her Room (Marvins Room Remix)"	2011	None	Taj & Mike Ho
"Make Your Move"	2012	Wale	J. Williams
"Bad Boy"	2012	None	Teyana Taylor & Rage
"Maybe"	2014	Pusha T, Yo Gotti	Brendan Cochrane
"Business"	2014	None	Elspeth Victoria Brown
"Do Not Disturb"	2014	None	Elspeth Victoria Brown
"Broken Hearted Girl"	2014	None	Elspeth Victoria Brown
"Request"	2014	None	Elspeth Victoria Brown
"Touch Me (Interlude)"	2016	None	Chaz Morgan & Teyana Taylor
"Undercover"	2016	None	Elijah Steen
"Champions (Freestyle)"	2016	None	Sasha Samsonova
"Drippin"	2017	Migos	Just Chaz
"Gonna Love Me"	2018	None	Teyana Taylor
"Rose in Harlem (KTSE Tour)"	2018	None	Teyana Taylor
"Gonna Love Me (Remix)"	2018	Ghostface Killah, Method Man, Raekwon	Teyana Taylor
"WTP"	2019	Mykki Blanco	Teyana Taylor
"Issues/Hold On"	2019	None	Teyana Taylor
"How You Want It?"	2019	King Combs	Teyana Taylor
"Morning"	2019	Kehlani	Teyana Taylor
"We Got Love"	2020	Lauryn Hill	Teyana Taylor
"Made It"	2020	None	Teyana Taylor
"Bare Wit Me"	2020	None	Teyana Taylor
"Wake Up Love"	2020	IMAN	Teyana Taylor
"Still"	2020	None	Teyana Taylor
"1800-One-Night"	2020	None	Teyana Taylor
"Concrete"	2020	None	Teyana Taylor
"Lose Each Other"	2020	None	Teyana Taylor
As featured artist
"Rock wit Me"	2012	Jadakiss	Willc & Tana
"Ballin'"	2013	Fat Joe	Eif Rivera
"Made for Me"	2014	Sebastian Mikael	Robbie Barclay
"F You I Love You"	2019	Kyle	Teyana Taylor
"Home Body (Remix)"	2019	Lil Durk	Teyana Taylor
"Gimme Love (Remix)"	2019	Seyi Shay	Walu
As choreographer
"Ring the Alarm"	2006	Beyoncé	Sophie Muller
As director
"Commitment"	2019	Monica	Teyana Taylor
"Lies"	2019	Schoolboy Q, Ty Dolla Sign, YG	Teyana Taylor
"Buddha"	2019	Macy Gray	Teyana Taylor
"Pack Lite"	2020	Queen Naija	Teyana Taylor
Guest appearances
"Blue Magic"	2007	Jay-Z, Pharrell Williams	Hype Williams
"She Got Her Own"	2008	Ne-Yo, Fabolous, Jamie Foxx	Vinroc
"Drop It Low"	2009	Ester Dean, Chris Brown	Joseph Kahn
"Yeah 3x"	2010	Chris Brown	Colin Tilley
"Beautiful People"	2011	Chris Brown, Benny Benassi	Esteban Serrano
"My Last"	2011	Big Sean, Chris Brown	TAJ Stansberry
"Mercy"	2012	Kanye West, Big Sean, Pusha T, 2 Chainz	Nabil Elderkin
"Reservations"	2012	Sir Michael Rocks	Alex Nazari
"Thim Slick"	2014	Fabolous, Jeremih	Gerard Victor
"I Don't Fuck with You"	2014	Big Sean	Lawrence Lamont
"Fade"	2016	Kanye West	Eli Linnetz
"Throw It Back"	2019	Missy Elliott	Daniel Russell
"DripDemeanor"	2019	Missy Elliott, Sum1	Missy Elliott & Derek Blanks
"Cool Off"	2020	Missy Elliott	Daniel Russell
"Woman"	2021	Doja Cat	child.
