= Wake Up Love =

2020 single by Teyana Taylor

Single by Teyana Taylor featuring Iman Shumpert

from the album The Album
- Released: June 12, 2020
- Genre: R&B
- Length: 3:35
- Label: GOOD; Def Jam
- Songwriters: Teyana Taylor; Carl McCormick; Iman Shumpert; Kesington Kross; Steve M. Thornton II
- Producers: Swift D; Cardiak

Teyana Taylor singles chronology
"Made It" (2020)	"Wake Up Love" (2020)

Music video
- "Wake Up Love" on YouTube

"Wake Up Love" is a song by American singer Teyana Taylor, released as a single from her third studio album, The Album, on June 12, 2020, through GOOD Music and Def Jam Recordings. It features her then-husband Iman Shumpert. Taylor co-wrote the song with Shumpert, Cardiak, Steve M. Thornton II and Kesington Kross. The song's accompanying music video was released simultaneously during the song's release.

== Charts ==
Chart (2020)	Peak position
US Hot R&B Songs (Billboard)	14

== Certifications ==
Region	Certification	Certified units/sales
United States (RIAA)	Gold	500,000^{‡}
^{‡} Sales+streaming figures based on certification alone.
