= The Album (Teyana Taylor album) =

Studio album by Teyana Taylor
- Released: June 19, 2020
- Genre: R&B
- Length: 77:19
- Labels: GOOD; Def Jam
- Producers: Teyana Taylor; Angel Lopez; Ayo; Bassman; Bizness Boi; BongoByTheWay; Cardiak; Carrington Brown; DJ Camper; Federico Vindver; Hitmaka; Jordan Mosley; Justin Mosley; Kanye West; Keyz; Louis Gold; Mike Dean; MIXX; Murda Beatz; Ninetyfour; Nova Wav; Ray Keys; Sean Momberger; Seven Aurelius; Scribz Riley; Swiff D; Timbaland; Travis Marsh; Tune Da Rula; U.N.I.; Wallis Lane

Teyana Taylor chronology
K.T.S.E. (2018)	The Album (2020)	Escape Room (2025)

Singles from The Album
- 1. "How You Want It?" Released: August 2, 2019; 2. "Morning" Released: November 1, 2019; 3. "We Got Love" Released: December 6, 2019; 4. "Made It" Released: May 22, 2020; 5. "Wake Up Love" Released: June 12, 2020

The Album is the third studio album by American singer Teyana Taylor. The album was released on June 19, 2020, through GOOD Music and Def Jam Recordings, almost exactly two years after her 8 track second album K.T.S.E. The album was preceded by the release of five singles "How You Want It?", "Morning", "We Got Love", "Made It" and "Wake Up Love". The 23-track album features guest appearances from Erykah Badu, Kehlani, Big Sean, Lauryn Hill, Future, Rick Ross, Quavo, and Missy Elliott. Taylor's ex-husband, Iman Shumpert and their daughter Junie also appear.

The album was certified gold by the RIAA in June 2025.

== Background and recording ==
Following the release of her second studio album K.T.S.E. (2018), Taylor announced that she would be updating the album and re-releasing it in June or July. After a Twitter user asked for the whereabouts of her updated album, Taylor revealed that her hopes for a new version had been deflated. "I guess we ain't getting one," she bluntly replied. Minutes later, Taylor sent a second tweet explaining how she intends to release the updated music. "A lot of clearance issues, shit takes time. At this point I will leave album the way it is & will just debut the extended records thru my visuals!" she said. In October 2019, Taylor spoke to Entertainment Weekly that she was working on a new album titled, The Album after many disappointments and frustrations with her previous record. She revealed that she took more creative control on the album in comparison to K.T.S.E., which had a verse cut without her knowledge and was shorter than she wanted. She said that she was ready to "take full accountability that I need to be 110 percent on everything that I do" and not let anyone compromise her creative vision. She revealed that for the album, she was focused on "fixing what didn't work the first time, getting a better rollout, more records, longer records. . . just giving everybody more." She aimed to release new music by the next year.

== Composition ==
Professional ratings
Aggregate scores
Source	Rating
Metacritic	78/100
Review scores
Source	Rating
AllMusic	4/5 stars
Clash	9/10
Entertainment Weekly	B+
NME	4/5 stars
Pitchfork	7.3/10
Rolling Stone	3/5 stars
Tom Hull – on the Web	B+

Complex's Eric Diep summarized the album: "The album is broken up by "studio" rooms (which appropriately spell out "album" reading from top to bottom). At 23 songs in length, it is significantly longer than Taylor's previous album, K.T.S.E., which was eight songs. Taylor was part of G.O.O.D. Music's seven-song album rollout, promising to re-release an updated version of K.T.S.E., but it never materialized. From those sessions, "We Got Love" appears at the end of The Album, replacing Kanye West with her doing his verse. Lauryn Hill speaks about wealth and abundance at the end". Taylor's husband Iman Shumpert appears on "Wake Up Love", while their daughter Junie is featured on "Come Back to Me."

== Release and controversy ==
Two days prior to the album's release, Taylor celebrated her Juneteenth release with an album listening party, alongside friends like Cardi B, Lena Waithe, Karrueche Tran, and Winnie Harlow. Taylor sparked controversy and was criticized by social media outlets after photos from the event showed most attendees with their masks partially off or not on at all despite the restrictions to keep them on while being in public during the COVID-19 pandemic in the United States. Taylor went on to address the apparent lack of masks: "... For all the internet covid experts 🙄😜we had REAL Covid Police & medics that made sure we were all safe and able to have a good time all while following covid regulations," she wrote. "Custom '#TheAlbum' Masks and hazmat suits were also provided!" Taylor shed more light on the situation during a video interview with Angie Martinez, doubling down on her claims that she and her team took extra steps to ensure guests' safety.

"So this is what I knew was kind of gonna happen, If you notice, we all had yellow suits. They were custom HAZMAT suits ... custom masks, everything ... It was hot. You know, as a pregnant woman, I can't breathe in them things. You got to realize, if everybody got on masks, the photographers can't get what they want ... So the moment n***as take their masks off for five minutes, it's flash, flash, flash, flash ... So now it's just looking like we don't even have 'em on ... as soon as we put them back on, now all the cameras is ghosts, 'cause it does nothing for the lenses."

Taylor went on to say it was a 60-person party in a 15,000-feet house with a lot of activity taking place outside. She also said there were "COVID prevention people" at the event. "Pretty much the 'COVID police' ... You could not even walk in the house without putting on your HAZMAT suit and your mask," Taylor said. "... We were extremely safe."

Taylor explained why she decided to release the album on Juneteenth:

"With releasing the album on Juneteenth, it's important because if you noticed the lead singles that I led with were "Made It" and "We Got Love". So I've always been here. I've always been about us being celebrated and celebrating my culture and my people. For everything to happen, from my album getting delayed and it falls perfectly on Juneteenth, yes, it's a celebration.

== Commercial performance ==
The Album debuted at number eight on the US Billboard 200 chart, earning 32,000 album-equivalent units (including pure album sales of 4,000 copies) in its first week. This became Taylor's first US top-ten debut on the chart.

== Track listing ==
Studio A
No.	Title	Writer(s)	Producer(s)	Length
1.	"Intro"	Teyana Taylor; Corey Cooper; Carrington Brown; Keithen "Bassman" Foster; Baruch Nembhard	Carrington Brown; Bassman; MIXX	2:47
2.	"Come Back to Me" (featuring Rick Ross and Junie)	Taylor; William Roberts; Anesha Birchett-Moody; Antea Birchett; Brittany Coney; Denisia Andrews; Darhyl Camper	DJ Camper	4:09
3.	"Wake Up Love" (featuring Iman)	Taylor; Iman Shumpert; Kes Kross; Carl McCormick; Steve Thornton	Cardiak; Swiff D	3:33
4.	"Lowkey" (featuring Erykah Badu)	Taylor; Erica Wright; David Harris; Gabriel Lambirth; Chloe Mitchell; Scott Anthony; Austin Owens; James Foye III; Brown; Foster; Charles Simmons; Frank Alstin Jr.; Richard Roebuck	Ayo; Keyz; Bassman^{[b]}	4:17
5.	"Let's Build" (featuring Quavo)	Taylor; Quavious Marshall; Shane Lindstrom; McCormick	Murda Beatz; Cardiak	2:31

Studio L
No.	Title	Writer(s)	Producer(s)	Length
6.	"1800-One-Night"	Taylor; Camper	Taylor; DJ Camper	2:32
7.	"Morning" (with Kehlani)	Taylor; Kehlani Parrish; Kross; Nembhard; Miguel Jiminez; Tune Da Rula	MIXX; Louis Gold; Tune Da Rula	4:47
8.	"Boomin" (featuring Missy Elliott and Future)	Taylor; Melissa Elliott; Nayvadius Wilburn; Timothy Mosley; Jose Angel Velazquez; Federico Vindver; Jordan Mosley; Justin Mosley; Robert Kelly; Natina Reed; Camper	Timbaland; Taylor; DJ Camper; Angel Lopez^{[a]}; Federico Vindver^{[a]}; Jordan Mosley^{[a]}; Justin Mosley^{[a]}	5:31
9.	"69"	Taylor; Eric Bellinger; Marlon Hampton; Uforo Ebong; Naomi Saalfield; Raymond Komba; Perrin Moss; Simon Mavin	BongoByTheWay; Ray Keys	2:41
10.	"Killa" (featuring Davido)	Taylor; David Adeleke; Kross; Nembhard; Tune Da Rula	MIXX; Tune Da Rula	3:02

Studio B
No.	Title	Writer(s)	Producer(s)	Length
11.	"Bad"	Taylor; Coney; Andrews; Owens; Foye; Hal Ritson; Richard Adlam	Ayo; Keyz; Hal Ritson^{[b]}; Richard Adlam^{[b]}; Sean Alaric^{[b]}; MIXX^{[b]}	1:27
12.	"Wrong Bitch"	Taylor; Owens; Foye	Ayo; Keyz	2:39
13.	"Shoot It Up" (featuring Big Sean)	Taylor; Sean Anderson; Joshua Coleman; Shumpert; Owens; Foye; Xenia Karungu; Marco Cuabra	Ayo; Keyz; Marco Mavy^{[a]}; Sangria^{[a]}	3:47
14.	"Bare wit Me"	Taylor; Nija Charles; McCormick; Andre Robertson; Eric Dugar	Cardiak; Bizness Boi; Ninetyfour	2:08

Studio U
No.	Title	Writer(s)	Producer(s)	Length
15.	"Lose Each Other"	Taylor; Badriia Bourelly; Michael Dean; Ebong; Komba	Mike Dean; Bongo ByTheWay; Ray Keys	2:19
16.	"Concrete"	Taylor; Coney; Andrews; Travis Marsh	Nova Wav; Travis Marsh	3:57
17.	"Still"	Taylor; Coney; Andrews; Aaron Goldstein; Argaw Belay; Nima Jahanbin; Paimon Jahanbin; Roberto Burgos; Valerie Cooper	Wallis Lane; U.N.I.^{[a]}	4:04
18.	"Ever Ever"	Taylor; Coney; Andrews; Lauryn Hill; Wyclef Jean	Nova Wav	4:41

Studio M
No.	Title	Writer(s)	Producer(s)	Length
19.	"Try Again"	Taylor; Charles; Michael Orabiyi; Sean Momberger	Scribz Riley; Sean Momberger	2:58
20.	"Friends"	Taylor; Coney; Andrews; Taalib Johnson; Carvin Haggins; Bobby Hebb	Nova Wav	2:24
21.	"How You Want It?" (featuring King Combs)	Taylor; Christian Combs; McCormick; Christian Ward; Jahmal Gwin; Bellinger; Lerron Carson; Mason Betha; Sean Combs; Curtis Mayfield; Nashiem Myrick; Keisha Spivey	Cardiak; Hitmaka; BoogzDaBeast	3:41
22.	"Made It"	Taylor; Kanye West; Coney; Andrews; Gwin; Terius Gray; Byron Thomas; Dwayne Carter; Walter Sigler; James Sigler; Morris Bailey	Kanye West; Nova Wav; BoogzDaBeast^{[a]}	3:18
23.	"We Got Love" (featuring Lauryn Hill)	Taylor; Hill; Coney; Andrews; West; Dean; Gwin; Evan Mast; Stephen Feigenbaum; Marcus Vest; Ronald Preyer; Vernon Bullock; Charles Ingersoll; Robert Solomon	West; Dean; Seven Aurelius; E*vax^{[a]}; BoogzDaBeast^{[a]}; Johan Lenox^{[b]}	4:06
Total length:				77:19

iTunes deluxe edition bonus videos
No.	Title	Length
24.	"How You Want It?" (featuring King Combs)	3:49
25.	"Morning" (with Kehlani)	4:22
26.	"Bare wit Me"	4:53
27.	"Wake Up Love" (featuring Iman)	3:38
28.	"Made It"	4:40
29.	"We Got Love" (featuring Lauryn Hill)	4:22

Notes

- ^{^[a]} signifies a co-producer
- ^{^[b]} signifies an additional producer
- Laruyn Hill is credited as "Ms. Lauryn Hill" on digital platforms.
- "Intro" features spoken word by Iman Shumpert, and background vocals by Corey Cooper.
- "Wake Up Love" features additional vocals by Kes Kross.
- "Boomin" features additional vocals by Timbaland.
- "Bad" features additional vocals by Barryon Nembhard.
- "We Got Love" features additional vocals by Sharlene Hector, Richard Adlam, Louise Clare Marshall, Hal Ritson and Brendan Reilly.

Sample credits

- "Come Back to Me" contains uncredited samples of “You Don't Know My Name”, written by Alicia Keys, Kanye West, Harold Lilly, J. R. Bailey, Mel Kent and Ken Williams, and performed by Keys.
- "Lowkey" contains samples of "Next Lifetime", written by Erica Wright and Scott Anthony, and performed by Erykah Badu.
- "Boomin" contains an interpolation of "808", written by Robert Kelly and Natina Reed, and performed by Blaque.
- "69" contains samples of "Borderline With My Atoms", written by Naomi Saalfield, Raymond Komba, Perrin Moss and Simon Mavin, and performed by Hiatus Kaiyote.
- "Still" contains elements of "Acting", written by Roberto Burgos and Valerie Cooper, and performed by Sweet Trip.
- "Ever Ever" contains samples of "The Sweetest Thing", written by Lauryn Hill and Wyclef Jean, and performed by Refugee Camp All-Stars from the film soundtrack of Love Jones.
- "Try Again" contains interpolations to the song of the same name, written by Timothy Mosley and Stephen Garett, and performed by Aaliyah.
- "Friends" contains elements of "Just Friends (Sunny)", written by Taalib Johnson, Carvin Haggins and Bobby Hebb, and performed by Musiq Soulchild.
- "How You Want It" contains samples of "What You Want", written by Mason Betha, Sean Combs, Nashiem Myrick and Keisha Spivey, and performed by Mase, which also samples "Right On for the Darkness", written and performed by Curtis Mayfield.
- "Made It" contains interpolations of "Back That Azz Up", written by Terius Gray, Byron Thomas and Dwayne Carter, and performed by Juvenile; and samples of "He'll Never Love You Like I Do", written by Walter Sigler, James Sigler and Morris Bailey, and performed by The Spinners.
- "We Got Love" contains a sample of "We've Got Love (You Better Believe It)", written by Ronald Preyer, Vernon Bullock, Charles Ingersoll and Robert Solomon, and performed by The Younghearts.

== Credits and personnel ==
Credits adapted from Tidal and YouTube.

=== Performance ===
- Teyana Taylor – primary artist
- Iman Shumpert – Spoken word (track 1), vocals (track 3)
- Rick Ross – vocals (track 2)
- Kes Kross – vocals (track 3)
- Erykah Badu – vocals (track 4)
- Quavo – vocals (track 5)
- Kehlani – vocals (track 7)
- Missy Elliott – vocals (track 8)
- Future – vocals (track 8)
- DaVido – vocals (track 10)
- Big Sean – vocals (track 13)
- King Combs – vocals (track 21)
- Lauryn Hill – vocals (track 23)
- Brendan Reilly – vocals (track 23)
- Hal Ritson – vocals (track 23)
- Louise Clare Marshall – vocals (track 23)
- Richard Adlam – vocals (track 23)
- Sharlene Hector – vocals (track 23)
- Corey Cooper – background vocals (track 1)
- Barryon Nembhard – background vocals (track 11)

=== Instrumentation ===
- Bassman – bass guitar (tracks 1 and 4)
- Travis Marsh – guitar (track 16), keyboards (track 16), synth (track 16)
- Carrington Brown – drums (tracks 1 and 4), keyboards (track 1), percussion (track 1)
- Ayo N Keyz – drums (tracks 4,11, and 13), bass guitar (track 11), keyboards (track 13)
- David Harris – drums (track 4)
- Gabriel Lambrinth – guitar (track 4)
- Ricky Ramos – guitar (track 4)
- Zo – keyboards (track 4)
- Angel Lopez – bass guitar (track 8), drums (track 8), keyboards (track 8)
- Federico Vindver – bass guitar (track 8), drums (track 8), keyboards (track 8)
- Jordan Mosley – keyboards (track 8)
- Justin Mosley – keyboards (track 8)
- Timbaland – percussion (track 8)
- Sean Alaric – bass guitar (track 11), drums (track 11), guitar (track 11), keyboards (track 11)
- MIXX – drums (track 11)
- Rob Harris – guitar (track 11)
- Hal Ritson – keyboards (track 11)
- Richard Adlam – keyboards (track 11)
- Ben Somers – saxophone (track 11)
- Neil Waters – trumpet (track 11)
- Bizness Boi – drums (track 14)
- Ninety Four – (track 14)
- Cardiak – guitar (track 14)
- Mike Dean – bass guitar (track 15), guitar (track 15)
- Ray Keys – keyboards (track 15)
- Michael Blackburn — guitar (track 19)
- Seven Aurelius – keyboards (track 23)
- Johan Lenox – string arranger (track 23)
- Yasmeen Al-Mazeedi – violin (track 23)

=== Production ===
- Carrington Brown – production (track 1), additional production (track 4)
- Bassman – production (track 1), additional production (track 4)
- MIXX – production (tracks 1, 7, and 10), additional production (track 11)
- DJ Camper – production (tracks 2, 6, and 8)
- Cardiak – production (tracks 3, 5, 14, and 21)
- Swiff D – production (track 3)
- Ayo N Keyz – production (tracks 4, 11–13)
- Murda Beatz – production (track 5)
- Teyana Taylor – production (tracks 6 and 8)
- Louis Gold – production (track 7)
- Tune Da Rula – production (tracks 7 and 10)
- Timbaland – production (track 8)
- Bongo BytheWay – production (tracks 9 and 15)
- Bizness Boi – production (track 14)
- Ninety Four – production (track 14)
- Mike Dean – production (tracks 15 and 23)
- Ray Keys – production (track 15)
- Nova Wav – production (tracks 16, 18, 20, and 22)
- Travis Marsh – production (track 16)
- Wallis Lane – production (track 17)
- Scribz – production (track 19)
- Sean Momberger – production (track 10)
- BoogzDaBeast – production (track 21), co-production (tracks 22 and 23)
- Hitmaka – production (track 21)
- Kanye West – production (tracks 22 and 23)
- Seven Aurelius – production (track 23)
- Hal Ritson – additional production (track 11)
- Richard Adlam – additional production (track 11)
- Sean Alaric – additional production (track 11)
- Johan Lenox – additional production (track 23)
- Angel Lopez – co-production (track 8)
- Federico Vindver – co-production (track 8)
- Jordan Mosley – co-production (track 8)
- Justin Mosley – co-production (track 8)
- Marco Mavy – co-production (track 13)
- Sangria (Josh Terrelle) – co-production (track 13)
- U.N.I. – co-production (track 17)
- E*vax – co-production (track 23)

=== Technical ===
- Colin Leonard – mastering (tracks 1, 2, and 4–22)
- Jaycen Joshua – mixing (tracks 1–22)
- Andrew Dawson – mixing (track 23),
- Jess Jackson – mixing (track 23)
- Mike Snell – vocal mixing (tracks 1–5, and 9–13, 15–20), recording (tracks 2–13, 15–17, 19, 21–22)
- MIXX – recording (tracks 1–3, and 5–8, and 15 and 18, 20, 22)
- Joel White – recording (tracks 12 and 22)
- Jenna Felsenthal – recording assistance (track 23)
- DJ Riggins – mixing assistance (tracks 1–22)
- Jacob Richards – mixing assistance (tracks 1–22)
- Mike Seaberg – mixing assistance (tracks 1–22)
- Sean Solymar – mixing assistance (track 23), recording assistance (track 23)

Notes

- Ayo N Keyz are credited together in production and instrumentation.

== Charts ==
Chart performance for The Album
Chart (2020)	Peak position
Canadian Albums (Billboard)	72
UK Albums (Official Charts)	76
UK R&B Albums (Official Charts)	12
US Billboard 200	8
US Top R&B/Hip-Hop Albums (Billboard)	6

== Certifications ==
Certifications for The Album
Region	Certification	Certified units/sales
United States (RIAA)	Gold	500,000^{‡}
^{‡} Sales+streaming figures based on certification alone.
