= Morning (Teyana Taylor and Kehlani song) =

Single by Teyana Taylor and Kehlani

from the album The Album
- Released: November 1, 2019
- Length: 4:15
- Label: Getting Out Our Dreams; Def Jam
- Songwriters: Teyana Taylor; Kehlani Parrish; Kesington Kross; Baruch Nembhard; Miguel Jiminez; Tune Da Rula
- Producers: Baruch "MIXX" Nembhard; Louis Gold; Tune Da Rula

Teyana Taylor singles chronology
"How You Want It?" (2019)	"Morning" (2019)	"We Got Love" (2019)

Kehlani singles chronology
"Ride" (2019)	"Morning" (2019)	"You Know Wassup" (2019)

"Morning" is a song by American singer-songwriters Teyana Taylor and Kehlani. It was released on November 1, 2019, with a music video directed by Taylor. It is the second track after "How You Want It?" on Taylor's third album titled The Album.

== Charts ==
Chart performance for "Morning"
Chart (2019)	Peak position
New Zealand Hot Singles (RMNZ)	27
US Bubbling Under Hot 100 (Billboard)	23
US Digital Song Sales (Billboard)	50
US Rolling Stone Top 100	95

== Certifications ==
Certifications for "Morning"
Region	Certification	Certified units/sales
United States (RIAA)	Gold	500,000^{‡}
^{‡} Sales+streaming figures based on certification alone.
