= Maybe (Teyana Taylor song) =

Single by Teyana Taylor featuring Pusha T and Yo Gotti

from the album VII
- Released: June 16, 2014
- Recorded: 2014
- Genre: R&B; hip hop
- Length: 4:05
- Label: GOOD; Def Jam
- Songwriters: Teyana Taylor; Rickey Deleon; Brian Soko; Andre Proctor; Rasool Diaz; Jaramye Daniels; Akil C. King; Kyle Owens; Terrence Thornton; Mario Mims
- Producers: The Order Music, Jaramye Daniels; Kyle "KO" Owens

Teyana Taylor singles chronology
"Bad Boy" (2012)	"Maybe" (2014)	"Do Not Disturb" (2014)

Pusha T singles chronology
"Move That Dope" (2014)	"Maybe" (2014)	"M.F.T.R." (2015)

Yo Gotti singles chronology
"Don't Worry 'Bout It" (2014)	"Maybe" (2014)	"Somethin' Right" (2014)

Music video
- "Maybe" on YouTube

"Maybe" is the lead single from American singer Teyana Taylor's major label debut album, VII. The track features guest verses by American rappers Pusha T and Yo Gotti.

== Background ==
The song was premiered on June 16, 2014 by Teyana as she announced the release date of her album.

== Music video ==
The music video was released on August 22, 2014 and was directed by Brendan Cochrane.

== Charts ==
Chart (2014)	Peak position
US Hot R&B/Hip-Hop Songs (Billboard)	50
US Bubbling Under Hot 100 (Billboard)	10

== Certifications ==
Region	Certification	Certified units/sales
United States (RIAA)	Gold	500,000^{‡}
^{‡} Sales+streaming figures based on certification alone.
