= How You Want It? =

Single by Teyana Taylor featuring King Combs

from the album The Album
- Released: August 2, 2019
- Genre: R&B
- Length: 3:42
- Label: GOOD; Def Jam
- Songwriters: Teyana Taylor; Sean Combs; Eric Bellinger; Christian Ward; Jahmal Gwin; Carl McCormick; Mason Betha; Nashiem Myrick; Keisha Spivey; Curtis Mayfield
- Producers: BoogzDaBeast; Hitmaka; Cardiak

Teyana Taylor singles chronology
"Issues/Hold On" (2018)	"How You Want It?" (2019)	"Morning" (2019)

"How You Want It?" (stylized as "HYWI?") is a song by American recording artist Teyana Taylor featuring King Combs. It was released as a single via GOOD Music and Def Jam Recordings on August 2, 2019 as the lead single from her third studio album The Album. The song was written by Teyana Taylor, Sean Combs, Eric Bellinger, Nashiem Myrick, Mason Betha, Keisha Spivey, Curtis Mayfield, alongside its producers, BoogzDaBeast, Cardiak, and Hitmaka.

== Composition ==
The song runs for 3 minutes and 42 seconds and samples Mase's "What You Want", which also contains a sample of Curtis Mayfield's "Right On The Darkness". The track contains "crisp drums and light guitars", as described by Hype Beast.

== Promotion ==
Just a week prior to the song's release, she announced on Instagram its release date and a teaser for the music video.

== Music video ==
The music video was released on the same day as the song's release on Taylor's YouTube channel. Directed by Taylor herself (under the name "Spike Tee"), it features footage of King Combs.

=== Synopsis ===
The music video opens with Teyana stares through a peephole while watching herself in various outfits. She then strips down while twerking on a white carpet in another throwback scene. Afterward, she appears in a scene of shiny suits. The final scenes conclude with a performance on a Las Vegas rooftop.

== Critical reception ==
Tom Breiham of Stereogum described the song as "a sexed-up ’90s-style jam" and praised the song's lyrics for its "strutting, loping piece of dirty talk". In a HotNewHipHop article by Erika Marie, she applauds King Combs and the song's sample, stating "the track was a collaboration of Bad Boy Records artists in the heart of an era when the label was dropping hits left and right, so it seems only fitting that Diddy's son adds his flavor on Teyana's revision of the beat".

== Credits and personnel ==
Adapted from Tidal and YouTube.

- Teyana Taylor – main artist, songwriting
- King Combs – featured artist
- Sean Combs – songwriting
- Hitmaka – production, songwriting
- BoogzDaBeast – production, songwriting, recording
- Cardiak – production, songwriting
- Nashiem Myrick – songwriting
- Mason Betha – songwriting
- Keisha Spivey – songwriting
- Curtis Mayfield – songwriting
- Eric Bellinger – songwriting
- Jaycen Joshua – mixing
- Jacob Richards – mixing assistance
- Mike Seaberg – mixing assistance

== Charts ==
Chart (2019)	Peak position
New Zealand Hot Singles (RMNZ)	13
US Hot R&B/Hip-Hop Songs (Billboard)	28
US R&B/Hip-Hop Airplay (Billboard)	33

== Certifications ==
Region	Certification	Certified units/sales
New Zealand (RMNZ)	Platinum	30,000^{‡}
United States (RIAA)	Platinum	1,000,000^{‡}
^{‡} Sales+streaming figures based on certification alone.

== Release history ==
Region	Date	Format	Label	Ref.
Various	August 3, 2019	Digital download; streaming	GOOD; Def Jam	
