= K.T.S.E. =

2018 studio album by Teyana Taylor

Studio album by Teyana Taylor
- Released: June 22, 2018
- Studios: West Lake Ranch, Jackson Hole, Wyoming
- Genre: R&B
- Length: 22:53
- Labels: GOOD; Def Jam
- Producer: Kanye West (also exec.)

Teyana Taylor chronology
The Cassette Tape 1994 (2015)	K.T.S.E. (2018)	The Album (2020)

Singles from K.T.S.E.
- 1. "Gonna Love Me" Released: July 17, 2018; 2. "Issues/Hold On" Released: April 2, 2019

K.T.S.E. (an initialism of Keep That Same Energy) is the second studio album by American singer Teyana Taylor, released on June 22, 2018, by GOOD Music and Def Jam Recordings.

Following the release of VII in 2014, Taylor took a step back from her music career, instead working in television, getting married and giving birth to her first child. In 2018, it was announced that Kanye West would be producing K.T.S.E, with recording for the album taking place in Wyoming. It is the final of five albums released over consecutive weeks, produced by West in their entirety as a part of the "Wyoming Sessions", following the release of Pusha T's Daytona, West's Ye and Kids See Ghosts with Kid Cudi, and Nas's Nasir. The album features a guest appearance by West, as well as additional vocals by Ty Dolla Sign and Mykki Blanco. A wide variety of record producers collaborated with West on the album, including Mike Dean, Rodney Jerkins, and BoogzDaBeast.

Taylor's and West's efforts resulted in an R&B album that heavily featured soul based productions and sampling. Upon release, Taylor announced that the album was released in an incomplete form, as several tracks were absent due to sample clearance issues. An updated version of K.T.S.E. was announced; however, Taylor appeared on the Breakfast Club and said she will not hold her breath on the album's extended version and she won't make any promises on it.

The album was certified gold by the RIAA in June 2025.

== Background ==
After releasing her debut studio album VII (2014), Taylor landed a number of television gigs, got married and became a mother. Taylor kept a low profile music-wise following VII, only releasing an EP and a few singles. In June 2016, Taylor released the song "Freak On", featuring guest vocals from Chris Brown. She announced that it would be the lead single from her upcoming second studio album; however, the album never came to fruition.

On August 28, 2016, at the MTV Video Music Awards, Kanye West premiered the music video for his single, "Fade", which features Taylor performing a dance routine inspired by the 1983 film Flashdance. In April 2018, Kanye West announced two new albums, a solo album and self-titled collaboration with Kid Cudi under the name Kids See Ghosts, both of which would be released in June. Additionally, he revealed he would produce upcoming albums by GOOD Music label-mates Pusha T and Teyana Taylor, as well as Nas.

Pusha T's Daytona was the first project out of Wyoming weekly releases. The following week, West released his album, Ye. The week after, West released a collaborative album with Kid Cudi, titled Kids See Ghosts, named after their group of the same name. The following week the fourth album from the Wyoming sessions, Nasir by Nas, was released. Taylor's album, KTSE, was the last of the five weekly releases and was slated to be released on June 22, 2018.

== Recording ==
In January 2018, Teyanna announced that recording for the album was complete, "just waiting on some minor tweaks and whatever last-minute switches or edits and a green light from Kanye", before revealing West as its executive producer. West was still working on the album's production on a flight from Paris to Los Angeles hours before the listening party.

== Composition ==
Unlike the previous four releases, K.T.S.E features eight songs instead of the traditional seven and breaks from the hip-hop heavy production style. K.T.S.E features soulful sounds and acoustic guitars but still includes West's signature vocal samples.

"Issues/Hold On" is an R&B song that features a "fuzzy, laidback beat" and samples Billy Stewart's 1965 single "I Do Love You". Kanye West and the song's co-producers strip the sample back leaving the song to feature a "tender guitar loop, warm bass line, simple drum pattern, and airy background vocals." Lyrically the song explores love and vulnerability, with themes of uncertainty regarding relationships due to past experiences.

== Release and promotion ==
The album was released by GOOD Music and Def Jam Recordings on June 22, 2018. To coincide with the album's release Taylor held a listening party in Los Angeles that was streamed live via Taylor's Twitter account starting at 11PM PST (2AM EST). K.T.S.E. was released incomplete, with the ninth track "We Got Love" being excluded due to an uncleared Billy Stewart sample. The track "Issues/Hold On" was to include a Sade sample and "Rose In Harlem" was going to contain an interpolation of Lauryn Hill's "Lost Ones". Taylor originally announced that K.T.S.E. would receive post-release updates similar to West's The Life of Pablo (2016) once the samples were cleared. However, on July 2, 2018, Taylor announced that the album would no longer be updated and instead the extended records may debut through future visuals. Taylor later said on July 12, 2018, that she wasn't aware there'd actually be no visuals for the album.

Taylor later performed a remixed version of "We Got Love" with West on Saturday Night Live on September 29, 2018. On October 1, 2018, the duo recorded a music video for the song at the TMZ offices, with indications that the song would appear on West's forthcoming album Yandhi. After Yandhi was scrapped, Taylor released "We Got Love" as a single in December 2019. Taylor later used "We Got Love" as the closing track on The Album (2020).

In support of the album Taylor embarked on a joint summer tour with American singer Jeremih across North America. The 24-city joint tour began in Tampa, Florida, on August 3 and make stops in Atlanta, Philadelphia, New York, Detroit, New Orleans before the tour ends in Portland, Oregon, on September 8. In late August, following a dispute between the two artists, Taylor dropped out of the tour.

=== Singles ===
"Gonna Love Me" impacted US urban contemporary radio on July 17, 2018, as the album's first single. A remixed version of the single, billed as the "Wu-Tey" remix, featuring the appearance of the Wu-Tang Clan members Ghostface Killah, Method Man, and Raekwon was released on October 19, 2018. A music video for the track was released on November 6, 2018. "Issues/Hold On" impacted US urban contemporary radio on April 2, 2019, as the second single from the album. On April 3, 2019, "Gonna Love Me" was certified gold in sales by the RIAA.

== Critical reception ==
Professional ratings
Aggregate scores
Source	Rating
AnyDecentMusic?	7.1/10
Metacritic	74/100
Review scores
Source	Rating
The A.V. Club	B
Consequence of Sound	B−
Exclaim!	6/10
The Guardian	4/5 stars
The Independent	4/5 stars
The New Zealand Herald	4/5 stars
Pitchfork	7.8/10
PopMatters	6/10
Rolling Stone	3.5/5 stars

K.T.S.E. was met with generally positive reviews from critics. At Metacritic, which assigns a normalized rating out of 100 from mainstream publications, the album received an average score of 74, based on eight reviews.

Alexis Petridis of The Guardian described K.T.S.E. as "a record that melds new and old R&B with such flair", praising Kanye West's production who "takes the artfully distorted old-school R&B samples that double as his calling card – the ones that, over the years, he's rendered increasingly abrasive and jarring – and returns them to a more blissed-out and soulful sound." Claire Lobenfeld of Pitchfork believed that K.T.S.E. is "long overdue, but the album remains too small a platform for her tremendous vocal talent", complimenting Teyana Taylor's performance whose "singing sounds luxurious but effortless" and "sticky and seductive." Maura Johnston of Rolling Stone wrote: "There are enough good ideas on K.T.S.E. to suggest a path to prominence for Taylor, and her album ends with a strong statement of purpose. But until Taylor releases, or is allowed to release, music more often, she will remain stuck on pop's sidelines – still necessary, and still missing."

=== Accolades ===
Year-end lists
Publication	Accolade	Rank	Ref.
Billboard	The 50 Best Albums of 2018	42	
Fact	The 50 Best Albums of 2018	40	
Thrillist	The Best Albums of 2018	39	
Complex	The Best Albums of 2018	37	
The Independent	The 40 Best Albums of 2018	30	
Stereogum	The 50 Best Albums of 2018	29	
Crack Magazine	The 50 Best Albums of 2018	27	
A.Side	The 25 Best Albums of 2018	23	
Flavorwire	The 25 Best Albums of 2018	16	
Paper	Top 20 Albums of 2018	8	
HotNewHipHop	Top 15 Hottest R&B Albums of 2018	7	
Billboard	The 10 Best R&B Albums of 2018	5	
Okayplayer	The Best Albums of 2018	1	

== Commercial performance ==
K.T.S.E. debuted at number 17 on the US Billboard 200 with 23,000 album-equivalent units, of which 7,000 were pure album sales. It was the seventh best-selling digital album of the week. It serves as Taylor's second top 20 album in the United States. In its second week the album fell to number 57 on the US Billboard 200, moving 10,000 album-equivalent units, which included 1,000 pure album sales.

== Track listing ==
No.	Title	Writer(s)	Producer(s)	Length
1.	"No Manners"	Teyana Taylor; Kanye West; Anthony Clemons; Scott Carter; Aliandro Prawl	West; Mark Batson^{[b]}; Mike Dean^{[b]}; Che Pope^{[b]}; BoogzDaBeast^{[b]}; Nathaniel Alford^{[c]}	1:39
2.	"Gonna Love Me"	Taylor; West; Denisia Andrews; Brittany Coney; Noah Goldstein; William Hart; Bill Withers	West; Goldstein^{[a]}; Dean^{[b]}; BoogzDaBeast^{[b]}	2:47
3.	"Issues / Hold On"	Taylor; Coney; Andrews; West; Dean	West; Dean^{[a]}; Plain Pat^{[b]}; BoogzDaBeast^{[b]}	3:06
4.	"Hurry" (featuring Kanye West)	Taylor; West; Clemons; Uforo Ebong; Carter	West; Dean^{[b]}; BoogzDaBeast^{[b]}; Alford^{[c]}	2:54
5.	"3Way"	Taylor; West; Rodney Jerkins; Eric Bellinger; Antony Williams; Tyrone Griffin, Jr.	West; Darkchild^{[a]}; Dean^{[a]}	3:24
6.	"Rose in Harlem"	Taylor; Coney; Andrews; West; Dean	West; Dean^{[a]}; Evan Mast^{[a]}; BoogzDaBeast^{[b]}	3:43
7.	"Never Would Have Made It"	Taylor; West; Andrews; Coney; Marvin Sapp	West	2:40
8.	"WTP" (featuring Mykki Blanco)	West; Taylor; Michael Quattlebaum; Andrew Dawson; Danielle Balbuena; James Brown; Octavia St. Laurent; Venus Xtravaganza	West; Dawson^{[a]}; Ely "The Creep" Rise^{[a]}; Nova Wav^{[b]}; Mykki Blanco^{[b]}	2:47
Total length:				22:53

Notes

- ^{^[a]} signifies a co-producer
- ^{^[b]} signifies an additional producer
- ^{^[c]} signifies a vocal producer
- "3Way" and "Never Would Have Made It" feature additional vocals by Ty Dolla Sign

Sample credits

- "No Manners" contains a sample from "Love Where Are You Hiding", written and performed by the Elgins.
- "Gonna Love Me" contains a sample of "I Gave to You", written and performed by the Delfonics; and samples of Michael Jackson's 1972 rendition of Bill Withers' "Ain't No Sunshine"
- "Issues/Hold On" contains a sample of "I Do Love You", written and performed by Billy Stewart.
- "Hurry" contains a sample of "Can't Strain My Brain", written and performed by Sly & the Family Stone.
- "3Way" contains an interpolation of "How Can I Love U 2nite", written and performed by Sisqó.
- "Rose In Harlem" contains elements of "Because I Love You, Girl", written and performed by the Stylistics; lyrical themes interpolated from Tupac Shakur's famous poem "The Rose That Grew from Concrete"; and a sample of "Spanish Harlem", written and performed by Ben E. King.
- "Never Would Have Made It" contains interpolations of "Never Would've Made It", written and performed by Marvin Sapp.
- "WTP" contains interpolations of "Work This Pussy (Hurt Me Mix)", written and performed by Junior Vasquez; "(Work This) Pussy (Original Bitch Mix)", written and performed by Go Bitch Go!; a sample of "Get Up Offa That Thing", written and performed by James Brown; and dialogue clips spoken by Octavia St. Laurent and Venus Xtravaganza in the 1991 American documentary film Paris is Burning.

== Personnel ==
- Mike Dean – engineering (tracks 1–6, 8), mixing (tracks 1, 3, 6)
- Zack Djurich – engineering (tracks 1, 3, 4, 6–8)
- Nathaniel Alford – engineering (tracks 1, 4, 6, 8)
- Noah Goldstein – engineering (tracks 1, 2, 4, 6)
- Baruch "Mixx" Nembhard – engineering (tracks 2, 3, 5, 6)
- Mike Snell – engineering (tracks 2, 3, 5, 6)
- Mike Malchicoff – engineering (track 1)
- Clinton "HeadAche" Walker III – engineering (track 7,8)
- Jenna Felsenthal – assistant recording engineering (tracks 1, 3–6, 8)
- Sean Solymar – assistant recording engineering (tracks 1, 3, 4, 6), assistant mixing (tracks 1–6, 8)
- Jess Jackson – mixing (tracks 1–6, 8)
- Andrew Dawson – mixing (tracks 2, 4, 5, 7)
- Stephen Feigenbaum – string arrangement (track 6)
- Yasmeen Al-Mazeedi – violin (tracks 3, 6)

== Charts ==
Chart (2018)	Peak position
Belgian Albums (Ultratop Flanders)	125
Canadian Albums (Billboard)	60
Dutch Albums (Album Top 100)	77
New Zealand Heatseeker Albums (RMNZ)	3
UK Albums (Official Charts)	57
US Billboard 200	17
US Top R&B/Hip-Hop Albums (Billboard)	10

== Certifications ==
Region	Certification	Certified units/sales
New Zealand (RMNZ)	Gold	7,500^{‡}
United States (RIAA)	Gold	500,000^{‡}
^{‡} Sales+streaming figures based on certification alone.

== Release history ==
List of release dates, formats, and label
Region	Date	Format	Label	Ref(s)
Various	June 22, 2018 (Original version)	Streaming; digital download	GOOD; Def Jam	
Various	November 9, 2018 (Original version)	CD	GOOD; Def Jam	
Various	November 28, 2018 (Original version)	Vinyl	GOOD; Def Jam	

== See also ==
- GOOD Fridays
