= Escape Room (Teyana Taylor album) =

Studio album by Teyana Taylor
- Released: August 22, 2025
- Genres: R&B; hip-hop
- Length: 47:00
- Labels: Taylormade; Def Jam
- Producers: Antoine Darden; Bssmn; Carrington Brown; Crater; Daoud; Dave Drake; Demibby; Derrick Milano; D. Phelps; Dre Butterz; Flippa123; Freaky Rob; Gwen Bunn; IAmNobodi; Kaytranada; Kavin Smith; Keithen Foster; Kristian Rose; Rance; Makii Beats; Met James; Mixx; Paula Sophia; Ray Keys; Rico Love; Teyana Taylor; The Runners; XYNothing

Teyana Taylor chronology
The Album (2020)	Escape Room (2025)

Singles from Escape Room
- 1. "Long Time" Released: June 4, 2025; 2. "Bed of Roses" Released: June 27, 2025

Escape Room is the fourth studio album by American singer Teyana Taylor, released through Taylormade Enterprises, Inc. on August 22, 2025, with distribution handled by Def Jam Recordings. It features production from Rico Love, the Runners, Kaytranada, Freaky Rob, and Derrick Milano, alongside narrated interludes by Issa Rae, Jill Scott, Taraji P. Henson, Jodie Turner-Smith, Kerry Washington, La La Anthony, Niecy Nash, Regina King, and Sarah Paulson. The album was accompanied by a 38-minute short film co-starring actors Aaron Pierre and LaKeith Stanfield, which was uploaded to YouTube.

Escape Room received a nomination for Best R&B Album at the 68th Annual Grammy Awards, marking Taylor's first career Grammy nomination.

== Background ==
In the aftermath of the release of previous studio album, The Album, Taylor announced her retirement from music in 2020 and subsequent pivot to creative directing for other artists after label strife. Taylor decided to return to music in early 2025 after an acrimonious, public divorce from Iman Shumpert and the signing of a new distribution deal with Def Jam Recordings.

Speaking on her new project to Variety, Taylor explains, "Escape Room isn't just a film or an album, it's a world I built to live in, bleed in, and heal in. I poured my heart into every layer, from the story to the sound, to capture that journey we all take through the shadows of heartbreak, whether that's love lost, friendships broken, dreams deferred and guide you toward the lightness of healing."

Clash described the project as a "chart[ing of] the aftermath of Taylor's divorce and her awakening after a period of creative ennui." Also described as "downcast", the album was compared to Janet Jackson's trademark album Velvet Rope in its interior sermonizing, slinky grooves and interlude-heavy, episodic feel."

== Critical reception ==
Professional ratings
Review scores
Source	Rating
Clash	8/10
Rolling Stone	4/5
NME	3/5

The album was met with acclaim. In a positive review from Rolling Stone, the album is celebrated by reviewer Meagan Jordan: "The irony of Escape Room, is that it's not about Taylor running away from her hurt, but rather toward it. It's a meditation of what liberation can be in love and life. Escape Room challenges its listeners to understand that healing — be it heartbreak or bodily injury — is sometimes best done among your tight-knit community, where those who love you best remember the pieces of your soul, putting them back together again. Throughout the project, Taylor leans on her creative peers, her new love interest, and her children to hold her up as she offers a new expression of her authenticity in this moment. She is not bound to her past or your societal presumption and/or expectations. As she has shown in her recent departure from music and potent return, her liberation comes from her mutability and power to change her mind whenever she is presented with new feelings and ideas. Junie said it best: "Thank you for coming back to music." Welcome home Tey — to the place within yourself and the new chambers in our hearts."

Reviewing the album for Clash, Shahzaib Hussain stated, "Escape Room reverberates with cinematic flair and curatorial focus, but its true strength lies in Taylor's understanding of the RnB rhapsody through time; the love song that is most effective when it's spare and submerged. For this reason, Escape Room is as necessary as anything Teyana Taylor has ever recorded."

In a more mixed review from Kyann-Sian Williams of NME, the album was considered yet another situation in Taylor's career where she has been shadowed by unrealised potential. Instead of "reclaiming the spotlight", Williams writes, the project is "more about survival."

== Commercial performance ==
The album debuted at number 67 on the US Billboard 200, number 17 on the US Top R&B/Hip-Hop Albums chart, and number 6 on the component Billboard R&B Albums chart with 14,500 first-week units sold.

== Track listing ==
Escape Room track listing
No.	Title	Lyrics	Music	Producer(s)	Length
1.	"Taraji P. Henson's Narration" (with Taraji P. Henson)	Teyana Taylor; Courtney "Coco" Gilbert; Taraji P. Henson	Taylor; Daoud Anthony; Carrington Brown; Baruch Nembhard	Daoud; Brown; Mixx	2:36
2.	"Fire Girl"	Taylor; Derrick Gray	Taylor; Anthony; Brown; Gray	Daoud; Brown	2:37
3.	"Sarah Paulson's Narration" (with Sarah Paulson)	Taylor; Sarah Paulson; Gilbert	Taylor; Brown	Brown	1:04
4.	"Long Time"	Taylor	Taylor; Richard Butler; Andrew Harr; Jermaine Jackson	Rico Love; The Runners; Brown^{[a]}; Mixx^{[a]}	1:54
5.	"La La's Narration" (with La La Anthony)	Taylor; La La Anthony; Gilbert	Brown; Nembhard	Brown; Mixx	0:23
6.	"Niecy Nash's Narration" (with Niecy Nash)	Taylor; Gilbert; Niecy Nash	Brown; Keithen Foster; Robert Gueringer; David Phelps	Brown; Bssmn; Freaky Rob	0:58
7.	"Hard Part" (with Lucky Daye)	Taylor; Christopher Wood; David Wood	Taylor; Brown; Shawn Carter; Beyoncé Knowles-Carter; Gueringer; Foster; Phelps; Elbernita Clark-Terrell; Dion Wilson	Brown; Bssmn; Freaky Rob; D. Phelps	2:38
8.	"Back to Life" (with Tasha Smith)	Taylor; Butler	Taylor; Brown; Butler; Jackson; Nembhard; Dwayne Nesmith; Phelps; Kavin Smith; Demetri Thomas	Rico Love; The Runners; Brown; Mixx; Demibby; Smith; D-Town; Phelps	3:13
9.	"Jodie Turner-Smith's Narration" (with Jodie Turner-Smith)	Taylor; Gilbert; Jodie Turner-Smith	Taylor; Brown; Marlon Hampton; Nembhard	Brown; Mixx; Hampton	1:14
10.	"All of Your Heart" (with Taraji P. Henson)	Taylor; Gwendolyn Bunn	Taylor; Brown; Bunn; Alexander John Chigbué	Brown; IAmNobodi; Bunn	2:52
11.	"Shut Up"	Taylor; Alexandria Dopson; Nakkia Mason	Taylor; Brown; Antoine Darden; Dave Drake; Raymond Komba	Taylor; Brown; Ray Keys; Drake; Larrance Dopson; Boe$; Sage Skolfield^{[v]}	2:26
12.	"Pum Pum Jump" (with Jill Scott and Tyla)	Taylor; Tyla Seethal; Jill Scott	Taylor; Brown; Matthew Burdette; Gray; Samuel Jean; Carl McCormick; Miranda Thomas; Kevin Wooten	Taylor; Brown; Drake	2:38
13.	"Open Invite" (with Kaytranada)	Taylor	Taylor; Melvin Barcliff; Brown; Louis Celestin; Melissa Elliott; Timothy Mosley	Taylor; Kaytranada; Brown	1:56
14.	"Issa Rae's Narration Part 1" (with Issa Rae)	Taylor; Issa Rae	Taylor; Brown; Gueringer	Brown; Freaky Rob; Simon Jonasson	1:33
15.	"In Your Head"	Taylor; Xenia Karungu; Kevin Likuyani	Taylor; Karungu; Likuyani	Mixx; Paula Sophia; Crater; Kvn Hrtlss^{[a]}	2:07
16.	"Final Destination"	Taylor; Jocelyn Donald; Mason	Taylor; Brown; Ronald Colson; Kristian Madsen; Chad Opperman	Brown; Flippa123; Dre Butterz; Mixx; Kristian Rose; Makli Beats	3:12
17.	"Issa Rae's Narration Part 2" (with Issa Rae)	Taylor; Rae	Taylor; Brown; Gueringer	Brown; Freaky Rob	1:08
18.	"Bed of Roses"	Taylor; Denisia Andrews; Brittany Coney	Taylor; Andrews; Coney; Machado Joseph; Smith	Phelps; XYNothing; Smith	2:29
19.	"Kerry Washington's Narration" (with Kerry Washington)	Taylor; Gilbert; Washington	Taylor; Brown	Brown	1:59
20.	"In Your Skin"	Taylor; Gabrielle Rodgers	Taylor; Anthony	Daoud	3:13
21.	"Regina King's Narration" (with Regina King)	Taylor; Taylor; Gilbert; Regina King	Taylor; Brown; Phelps; Emmett Walker IV	Brown; Emmett "Trill" Walker; Daoud; D. Phelps	1:15
22.	"Always" (with Rue Rose Shumpert and Junie Shumpert)	Taylor; Gilbert; Nate Jones; Junie Shumpert; Rue Rose Shumpert	Taylor; Brown; Austin James Grider; Nembhard; Nicole Zuraitis	Taylor; Mixx; Met James; Brown; Zuraitis^{[a]}	4:23
Total length:					47:00

=== Notes ===
- ^{^[a]} signifies an additional producer
- ^{^[v]} signifies a vocal producer
- "Hard Part" contains an interpolation of "Family Feud", written by Shawn Carter, Beyoncé Knowles-Carter, Dion Wilson, and Elbernita "Twinkie" Clark, and performed by Jay-Z and Beyoncé.
- "Open Invite" contains a sample of "Beep Me 911", written by Melissa Elliott, Timothy Mosley, and Melvin Barcliff, and performed by Missy Elliott, 702 and Magoo.

== Personnel ==
Credits adapted from Tidal.

=== Musicians ===
- Carrington Brown – keyboards (1–3, 5, 8, 9, 16, 19), bass (2, 3, 5, 9, 19), drums (6–8, 10, 11, 17, 19), programming (11); guitar, percussion (19); strings (21)
- Daoud – bass, drums, guitar, keyboards, percussion (1, 2, 20); background vocals (2, 20)
- Mixx – programming (1, 4, 16), percussion (4, 22), drums (4)
- Taraji P. Henson – vocals (1, 10)
- Teyana Taylor – vocals (2, 4, 7, 8, 10–13, 15, 16, 18, 20, 22), background vocals (6)
- Derrick Milano – background vocals (2)
- Jermaine Jackson – programming (4, 8)
- Robert "Freaky Rob" Gueringer – guitar (6, 7, 14, 17), bass (17)
- David Phelps – keyboards (6, 7), drums (18)
- Keithen "Bssmn" Foster – bass (6, 7)
- Niecy Nash – vocals (6)
- Lucky Daye – vocals (7)
- Demibby – bass, percussion (8)
- Tasha Smith – vocals (8)
- Jodie Turner-Smith – vocals (9)
- Dave Drake – keyboards, synthesizer (11, 12)
- Eliza Bagg – background vocals (11)
- Jaden Gray – background vocals (11)
- Jasmine Patton – background vocals (11)
- Jyon Gray – background vocals (11)
- Naarai Jacobs – background vocals (11)
- Porcha Clay – background vocals (11)
- Larrance Dopson – keyboards (11)
- Ray Keys – programming (11)
- Jill Scott – vocals, background vocals (12)
- Tyla – vocals (12)
- Ricardo "RickyStrings" Ramos – guitar (12)
- Oliver Taylor – trumpet (12)
- Issa Rae – vocals (14, 17)
- Simon Jonasson – guitar (14)
- Paula Sophia – drums, percussion, programming (15)
- Don't Call Me White Girl – additional vocals (16)
- Kavin Smith – guitar, keyboards (18)
- XYNothing – keyboards (18)
- Kerry Washington – vocals (19)
- Emmett "Trill" Walker – strings (21)
- Regina King – vocals (21)
- Austin James Grider – electric guitar, keyboards, percussion, programming (22)
- Nate Jones – bass (22)
- Ted Morcaldi – guitar (22)
- Met James – string arrangement (22)
- Suuvi – cello (22)
- Corinne Olsen – viola (22)
- Isabella Reyes – viola (22)
- Jordan Busa – violin (22)
- Soji Lee – violin (22)
- Junie Shumpert – vocals (22)
- Rue Rose Shumpert – vocals (22)

=== Technical ===
- Sean Solymar – mixing
- Mike Dean – mastering (all tracks), mixing (2, 4, 8, 18), additional mixing (1, 3, 5–7, 9–17, 19–22)
- Mixx – engineering (all tracks), sound design (1), vocal engineering (4), recording arrangement (8)
- Jermaine Jackson – engineering (4, 8)
- Carrington Brown – engineering (11), vocal engineering (4, 8)
- Ray Keys – engineering (11)
- Paula Sophia – engineering, recording arrangement (15)
- Austin James Grider – engineering (22)

== Charts ==
Chart performance for Escape Room
Chart (2025)	Peak position
US Billboard 200	67
US Top R&B/Hip-Hop Albums (Billboard)	17
