= Google Me (Teyana Taylor song) =

Single by Teyana Taylor

from the album From a Planet Called Harlem
- Released: February 5, 2008 (U.S.)
- Recorded: 2007
- Genre: Pop-rap
- Length: 3:23
- Label: Star Trak; Interscope
- Songwriters: Cristyle Johnson; Rickey Deleon; Esther Dean; Jazze Pha
- Producer: Jazze Pha

Teyana Taylor singles chronology
"Google Me" (2008)	"Christmas in Harlem" (2010)

Music video
- "Google Me" on YouTube

"Google Me" is the first single from American singer Teyana Taylor's debut mixtape, From a Planet Called Harlem. The track peaked at number 90 on the Billboard Hot R&B/Hip-Hop Songs chart.

The title of the single refers to the Google search engine.

== Track listing ==
Promo single

1. "Google Me" (Main) - 3:20
2. "Google Me" (Main w/o intro) - 3:19
3. "Google Me" (Instrumental) - 3:19
4. "Google Me" (Acapella) - 3:02
5. "Google Me" (Acapella w/o Intro) - 2:49

== Charts ==
Chart (2008)	Peak position
US Hot R&B/Hip-Hop Songs	90
