= VII (Teyana Taylor album) =

Studio album by Teyana Taylor
- Released: November 4, 2014
- Genres: R&B; hip-hop; soul
- Length: 38:58
- Labels: GOOD; Def Jam
- Producers: Teyana Taylor (exec.); Che Pope (exec.); Allen Ritter; Best Kept Secret; Blvck Amsterdam; Boi-1da; Brian Kennedy; Eric "Smash" Johnson; Harmony Samuels; Jaramye Daniels; Kyle "KO" Owens; L&F; Mixx; Mr. Franks (co.); Nick "Neeko" Brown; Nikhil (add.); Robert "Biz" Thomas; The Order Music; Vidal Davis

Teyana Taylor chronology
The Misunderstanding of Teyana Taylor (2012)	VII (2014)	The Cassette Tape 1994 (2015)

Deluxe edition cover

Singles from VII
- 1. "Maybe" Released: June 16, 2014; 2. "Do Not Disturb" Released: October 28, 2014

VII is the debut studio album by American singer Teyana Taylor. The album was released on November 4, 2014, by Def Jam Recordings and GOOD Music. Leading up to the album's release, Teyana released the mixtape The Misunderstanding of Teyana Taylor (2012), along with collaborating on the GOOD Music compilation album Cruel Summer (2012). The album features guest appearances from Chris Brown, Fabolous, Pusha T and Yo Gotti. The album was executively produced by Che Pope and Teyana Taylor. Recording took place at Jungle City Studios in New York & KMA Studios, NYC, as well as The Kennedy Compound in North Hollywood, California & Labren Studio in Inglewood, CA.

VII was promoted by the release of two official singles: "Maybe" featuring Yo Gotti and Pusha T, and "Do Not Disturb" featuring Chris Brown.

== Background ==
In 2012, Taylor was released from her contract with Interscope and Star Trak. Taylor stated that she and Star Trak founder Pharrell Williams, have remained amiable since the end of their business relationship. She has credited him as a "big brother" and sees her early signing to Star Trak as a "blessing". Taylor has stated on many occasions that her release from the label was necessary because she wanted to have a level of independence in the music industry. In an interview with DJ Skee, Taylor mentioned that "when [she] was signed for six years, [she] felt like she couldn't do [anything]," and that she "couldn't prove to [her] fans that [she] had the talent" and "couldn't sing from [her] heart." In an August 2012, interview with Complex, Taylor spoke about when she would begin recording the album, saying: "I start August 6. I’m so excited. I’ll be in the studio for a month straight. I’m going in. My iPod is full of Total, 112, and Mary, Mint Condition and Donell Jones and Brandy. That’s what I want to accomplish. I want that ‘90s vibe."

As an independent artist at the time of her release, she had begun preparing her second release, a mixtape titled The Misunderstanding of Teyana Taylor. The tape drew influences from 1990s R&B legends like Lauryn Hill and Mary J. Blige. The tape was released in the first half of 2012, and was preceded by the release of "Make Your Move" featuring Wale and "D.U.I." featuring Jadakiss and Fabolous, which was released on February 25, 2012. More positive reviews of the latter track note that "The Harlem songstress channels Janet Jackson as she glides over the smooth Hit-Boy-produced beat with her airy vocals, while fellow New Yorkers Fabolous and Jadakiss ride shotgun". After some time as an independent artist and taking time to find herself as an artist, Taylor signed a joint-venture deal with Kanye West's label GOOD Music and The Island Def Jam Music Group, on June 14, 2012. Taylor had established a relationship with the GOOD family before her signing. As part of GOOD Music, Taylor appears on the GOOD Music compilation album Cruel Summer, released September 18, 2012. She provides vocals for the opening track "To the World", with Kanye West and R. Kelly, provides the hook and chorus for "Sin City", which also features John Legend, Cyhi the Prynce, Malik Yusef and Travis Scott, and also duets with John Legend on a song titled "Bliss". Taylor and Legend's duet on the album was highly praised, Erika Ramirez of Billboard.com notes that "Teyana Taylor's beautifully brash voice ... illuminates in the electric-guitar heavy, Hudson Mohawke-produced 'Bliss'." Trent Fitzgerald of Popcrush.com also complimented the duet, saying that he hoped to "hear more soulful duets from [Taylor and Legend]."

In addition to being featured on the GOOD Music compilation Cruel Summer, Taylor soon began the process of recording her major-label debut album, to be released through GOOD Music and The Island Def Jam Music Group. On August 1, 2014, it was announced that that album would be titled VII, and would be released on October 21, 2014, through Def Jam and GOOD Music. In an August 2014, interview with Complex, she said that she would not let anyone hear the album before it was ready, saying: "They be like, ‘Well damn, T, can you send the album in? Can we hear something?. But I’m just like, 'I’ll send it in when it’s right.' I learned that from 'Ye. Like, he don’t care who is in the room. If he don’t feel like it sound right, you can’t hear it yet. When I played 'Ye the album, we all went over to his house. He was like, ‘You mind if I have a copy?’ I was like, 'I rather just get it right, then I'll give you a copy.' All he could do is laugh, because he knows I get it from him." In September 2014, the album was pushed back to November 4, 2014.

== Singles ==
June 16, 2014 saw the premiere of the first single from the album, "Maybe" featuring Pusha T and Yo Gotti. On August 22, 2014, the music video was released for "Maybe" featuring Pusha T and Yo Gotti. On October 8, 2014, a music video was released for "Business". On October 14, 2014, the music video was released for "Do Not Disturb" featuring Chris Brown. On October 21, 2014, the music video was released for "Broken Hearted Girl" featuring Fabolous. On October 28, 2014, the album's second single "Do Not Disturb" featuring Chris Brown was released.

== Critical response ==
Professional ratings
Aggregate scores
Source	Rating
Metacritic	77/100
Review scores
Source	Rating
AllMusic	4/5 stars
Complex	3/5 stars
Entertainment Weekly	B
HipHopDX	3.5/5 stars
PopMatters	7/10

VII received positive reviews from music critics. At Metacritic, which assigns a normalized rating out of 100 to reviews from critics, the album received an average score of 77, which indicates "generally favorable reviews", based on 4 reviews. Kyle Anderson of Entertainment Weekly said, "After an extended tour of duty on the guest-appearance battlefield—that's where she befriended mentor Kanye West—Taylor finally drops her official debut. VII lacks his boundary-warping weirdness, but she has a strong grasp on lush '90s-kissed R&B, especially on the stark, slithery "Business". Rachel Leah of HipHopDX stated, "Overall, VII feels authentic and offers a much wider scope of artistry than we’ve seen prior from the Island Def Jam artist. Teyana’s growth is evident, challenging her singing capabilities while honing in on her ranges of comfort. Aside from the lack of significant risk-taking, Teyana Taylor generated a debut album that is honest and well produced. And while she takes absolutely no risks on the album, and her vocal range is limited, she never strays from what she does well. Nevertheless, it seems like she can now officially change her title from on the scene vixen to contributing musician to R&B." Michael Arceneaux of Complex said, "Overall, VII makes for an impressive debut, though it remains to be seen whether or not audiences are willing to give her a real chance."

== Commercial performance ==
The album debuted at number 19 on the Billboard 200, selling 16,000 copies in the United States in its first week. In its second week, the album dropped to number 78 on the chart, selling 5,000 copies. In its third, the album dropped to number 160 on the chart, selling 3,000 copies, bringing its total album sales to 24,000 copies.

== Track listing ==
No.	Title	Writer(s)	Producer(s)	Length
1.	"Outta My League (Interlude)"	T. Taylor, S. Barthe, U. Ebong, C. Umana, E. Bellinger, J. Daniels, A. King, K. Owens	L&F	1:11
2.	"Just Different"	T. Taylor, C. Balmoris, J. Fauntleroy, J. Nixon, B. Jackson	Best Kept Secret	3:44
3.	"Request"	T. Taylor, E. Johnson, A. Shelton, A. Birchett	Eric "Smash" Johnson, Nick "Neeko" Brown	3:58
4.	"Do Not Disturb" (featuring Chris Brown)	T. Taylor, B. Soko, A. Proctor, R. Diaz, J. Daniels, A. King, K. Owens, J. Webb, C. Brown	The Order Music, Jaramye Daniels, Kyle "KO" Owens	4:12
5.	"Broken Hearted Girl" (featuring Fabolous)	T. Taylor, M. Samuels, R. Ridgley, N. Seetharam, E. Bellinger, B. Nembhard, J. Jackson, M. Brockert	Boi-1da, Nikhil (add.)	4:28
6.	"It Could Just Be Love (Interlude)"	T. Taylor, H. Samuels, C. Harrell, D. Scott, E. Hamilton	Harmony Samuels	1:30
7.	"Put Your Love On"	T. Taylor, H. Samuels, C. Harrell, C. Reece, S. Jacobs	Harmony Samuels	2:17
8.	"Maybe" (featuring Pusha T and Yo Gotti)	T. Taylor, B. Soko, A. Proctor, R. Diaz, J. Daniels, A. King, K. Owens, T. Thornton, M. Mims	The Order Music, Jaramye Daniels, Kyle "KO" Owens	4:05
9.	"Dreams"	T. Taylor, J. Daniels, A. King, A. Ritter, I.Shumpert	Allen Ritter	3:22
10.	"Sorry"	T. Taylor, V. Davis, R. Thomas, A. Birchett, A.Shelton	Vidal Davis, Robert "Biz" Thomas	4:05
11.	"Business"	T. Taylor, B. Seals, S. Franks, S. Jean	Brian Kennedy, Mr. Franks (co.)	3:16
12.	"In the Air"	T. Taylor, G. Blizman, A. Piccoli, B. Nembhard, K. Janai, M. Georges	Blvck Amsterdam, Mixx Production	2:50

Deluxe edition (bonus tracks)
No.	Title	Writer(s)	Producer(s)	Length
13.	"Outta My League"	T. Taylor, S. Barthe, U. Ebong, C. Umana, E. Bellinger, J. Daniels, A. King, K. Owens	L&F	4:09
14.	"It Could Just Be Love"	T. Taylor, H. Samuels, C. Harrell, D. Scott, E. Hamilton	Harmony Samuels	3:49

== Personnel ==
Credits adapted from AllMusic.

- Zach Atkinson - Cover Illustration, Logo
- Craig Balmoris - Composer, Producer
- Anesha Birchett - Composer
- Gabriel Blizman - Composer
- Blvck Amsterdam - Producer
- Boi-1da - Producer
- Chris Brown - Composer, Featured Artist
- Kelvin Brown - A&R
- Nick Brown - Assistant
- Leesa D. Brunson - A&R
- Cameron Chambers - Guitar (Electric)
- Tarron Crayton - Guitar (Bass)
- Jaramye Daniels - Composer, Vocal Producer
- Vidal Davis - Composer, Producer
- Fabolous - Featured Artist
- Garnett Flynn - Engineer
- Derek Folk - Executive Producer
- Chris Gehringer - Mastering
- Chris Hunte - Production Coordination
- Jimmy Jaipur - Assistant
- Keira Janai - Composer
- Eric "Smash" Johnson - Composer, Producer
- Terese Joseph - A&R
- Brian Kennedy - Producer
- Anthony Kilhoffer - Mixing
- Kyledidthis - Art Direction, Design
- L&F - Producer
- Paul Lane - Package Production
- Jonathan Lauture - Engineer
- Brittany Mansfield - A&R
- Brendan Morawski - Assistant
- Mr. Franks - Producer
- Baruch Nembhard - Composer, Engineer
- Nikhil - Additional Production
- Julian Nixon - Producer
- The Order - Producer
- Kyle Owens - Vocal Producer
- Michael Piazza - Engineer
- Adam Piccoli - Composer
- Che Pope - Executive Producer
- Noah Preston - A&R
- Pusha T - Featured Artist
- Raskind - Photography
- Allen Ritter - Composer, Producer
- Kyle Ross - Mixing Assistant
- Harmony Samuels - Composer, Producer
- Smallz - Photography
- Nikki Taylor - Executive Producer
- Teyana Taylor - Art Direction, Composer, Executive Producer, Primary Artist
- Robert Thomas - Composer, Producer
- Dan Tobiason - Engineer
- Jon Jon Traxx - Musician
- Meredith Truax - Photography
- Yo Gotti - Featured Artist

== Charts ==
Chart (2014)	Peak position
UK R&B Albums (Official Charts)	37
US Billboard 200	19
US Top R&B/Hip-Hop Albums (Billboard)	1

== Release history ==
Region	Format	Date	Label
Worldwide	CD; digital download	November 4, 2014	GOOD Music; Def Jam Recordings; Island Def Jam
