= Christmas in Harlem =

2010 single by Kanye West featuring Teyana Taylor and Cyhi the Prince

Single by Kanye West featuring Teyana Taylor and Cyhi the Prynce
- Released: December 17, 2010
- Genre: Hip-hop; Christmas
- Length: 3:56
- Label: Roc-A-Fella; Def Jam
- Songwriters: Kanye West; Cydel Young; Chauncey Hollis; Marvin Gaye; Shuggie Otis
- Producer: Hit-Boy

Kanye West singles chronology
"All of the Lights" (2010)	"Christmas in Harlem" (2010)	"H.A.M." (2011)

Cyhi the Prynce singles chronology
"Christmas in Harlem" (2010)	"Freak Some More" (2011)

Teyana Taylor singles chronology
"Google Me" (2008)	"Christmas in Harlem" (2010)	"Merk Out" (2012)

"Christmas in Harlem" is a song by the American rapper Kanye West. It was released as a standalone single on December 17, 2010, through Roc-A-Fella Records and Def Jam Recordings. The track features rapper Cyhi the Prynce and R&B singer Teyana Taylor, both of whom are signed to West's label GOOD Music. Produced by Hit-Boy, it is a Christmas hip-hop song that contains samples of four soul tracks, including two recorded by Marvin Gaye. The track features a holiday theme and various references to Christmas and customs associated with the holiday.

In 2010, West released free music weekly under the series GOOD Fridays to promote his fifth studio album, My Beautiful Dark Twisted Fantasy (2010). During the album's production, record producer Hit-Boy sent West beats in hopes of contributing to it. At a release party, he discovered that West was interested in using one of his instrumentals for a Christmas-themed song. By early 2011, Hit-Boy was signed to GOOD Music as a producer. The instrumental for "Christmas in Harlem" was intended for Cam'ron.

Emphasizing a piano melody and playful perspective on the Christmas spirit, "Christmas in Harlem" features braggadocio, sexual innuendo, and references to drugs and luxury, while still emphasizing family, gifts, and shopping. On December 15, 2010, the song was leaked online, which was an extended version featuring contributions from rappers Cam'ron, Jim Jones, Vado, Pusha T, and Big Sean, as well as R&B singer Musiq Soulchild. "Christmas in Harlem" received positive reviews from critics, who complimented its lyrics and compared it favorably to other Christmas-themed hip-hop songs. Commercially, the song appeared on three US single charts, with two of them reaching the top ten.

== Background and production ==
In August 2010, Kanye West began GOOD Fridays, a series of weekly free music releases, to promote his fifth studio album, My Beautiful Dark Twisted Fantasy (2010). The series' intention was to release a song through free download every Friday for a few months, which generally featured various rappers from his label, GOOD Music and other artists West collaborated with. My Beautiful Dark Twisted Fantasy was later released by Roc-A-Fella and Def Jam on November 22, 2010.

"Christmas in Harlem" was produced by Hit-Boy, who had been known as an emerging 23-year-old producer who worked with Eminem and Lil Wayne on "Drop the World" and Mary J. Blige on "Stronger" (both 2009). The beat for the song was initially given to Cam'ron before West. In an interview with Vibe, Hit-Boy revealed that his connection to West began through his associate Dala Roc, who introduced him to West's cousin, Ricky Anderson.

When West was working on My Beautiful Dark Twisted Fantasy, Hit-Boy repeatedly sent him beats in hopes of contributing to his project. On the night of West's New York release party, Anderson contacted Hit-Boy and informed him that West was interested in using one of his beats for a Christmas-themed song, ultimately becoming "Christmas in Harlem". Hit-Boy wasn't aware of the shift until a month prior to its release. Shortly afterward, Hit-Boy was signed to GOOD Music as a producer by early 2011. In addition to the song's production, Jim Jones, who was featured in the longer version, wanted two more music artists from Harlem to be featured on it, stating that it would have ended up as "Christmas in Chicago".

== Composition ==
"Christmas in Harlem"
A 23-second sample of "Christmas in Harlem", consisting of West's suggestive verse with Christmas references followed by a hook from Teyana Taylor.

"Christmas in Harlem" contains samples of two songs by soul musician Marvin Gaye: "Ain't Nothing Like the Real Thing" and "Mercy Mercy Me (The Ecology)", the former being a collaboration with soul singer Tammi Terrell. It also contains samples of "Strawberry Letter 23", originally written and performed by singer-songwriter Shuggie Otis, and the gospel-funk track "Papa Was Too" by Joe Tex. Both Gaye and Otis are given songwriting credits on "Christmas in Harlem" for use of the samples.

The song relies on a gentle piano melody and a playful mood based on the Christmas spirit throughout the song, with a hook from Teyana Taylor. While featuring themes based on family, gifts, last-minute shopping, and the Macy's Thanksgiving Day Parade, "Christmas in Harlem" contains references based on drugs and luxury, as well as braggadocio from West, with lines including "The streets lit up, it feels like Christmas officially/Told her that, 'You're the star at the top of the Christmas tree."

West opens the track with a suggestive note, saying that his date's "got a gift for me that ain't for the kids to see." West also used the phrase "hot chocolate" as a sexual innuendo. The longer version features cocaine-themed punchlines from Pusha T, Vado's braggadocious lines about his cars and jewelry, Jim Jones remembering when he "couldn't play Santa Claus", and Cam'ron referencing Judaism and wishing his lawyers a "Happy Hanukkah". On the shorter version, Cyhi the Prynce raps from Santa's perspective.

== Leak and release ==
Before its official release, the track first leaked online on December 15, 2010. This version of "Christmas in Harlem" released as a part of GOOD Fridays featured additional contributions from rappers Cam'ron, Jim Jones, Vado, Pusha T, and Big Sean, as well as R&B singer Musiq Soulchild. On the same day, West tweeted that he would release this version soon. However, the shorter version of the track, featuring contributions from West, Cyhi the Prynce, and Teyana Taylor, was later released as a single to the iTunes Store on December 17, through Roc-A-Fella and Def Jam. It was the final release of the initial GOOD Fridays series.

== Reception ==
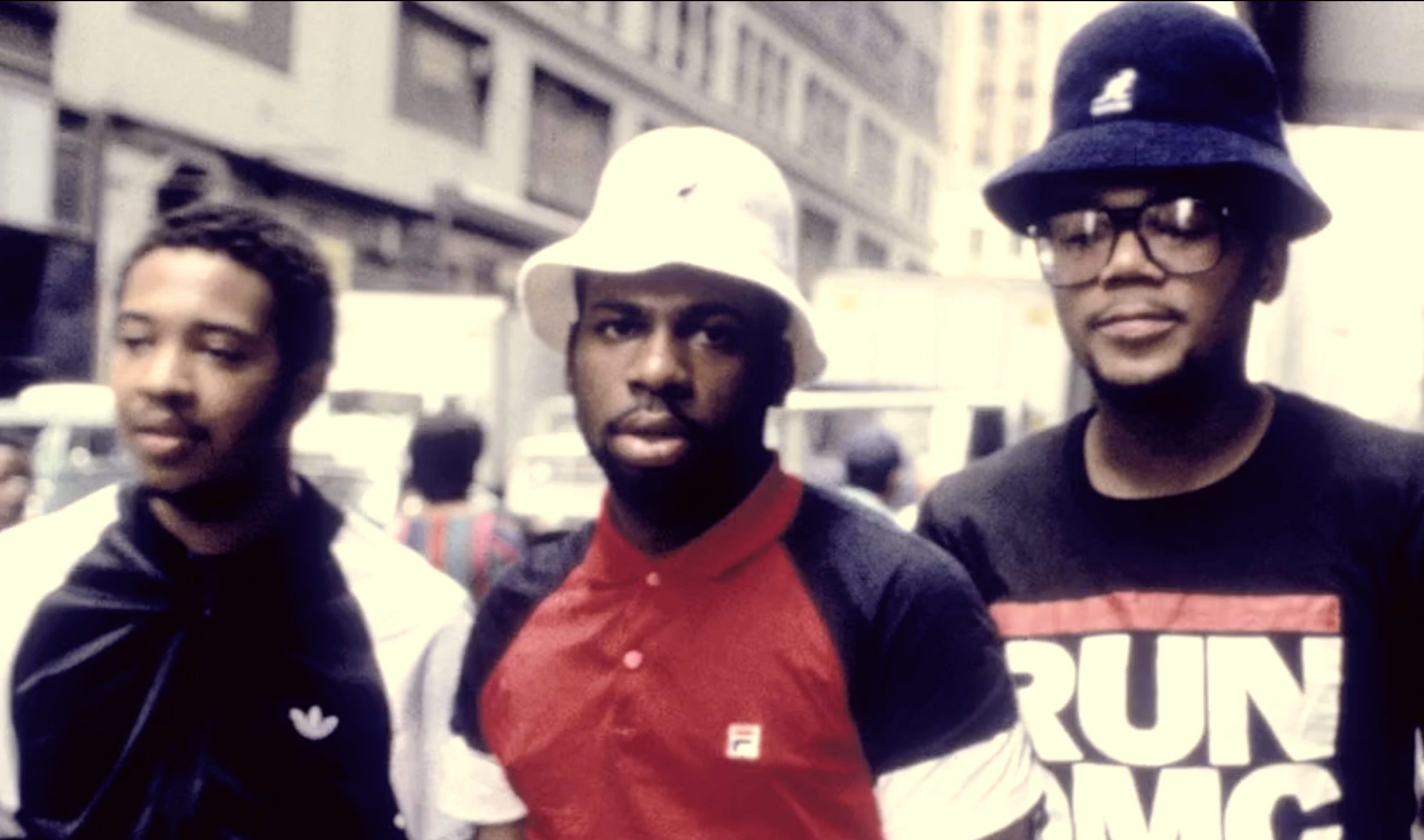
"Christmas in Harlem" was compared favorably to Run-DMC's "Christmas in Hollis" (1987) by Rolling Stone.

"Christmas in Harlem" received positive reviews from critics. Giving the song a three-and-a-half-star rating, Chuck Eddy of Rolling Stone described "Christmas in Harlem" as containing "tinsel-tinted stocking stuffer sounds uncharacteristically tossed-off, as if he's preoccupied with the Xmas shopping spree he says he's planning." He additionally praised Taylor's vocals, saying that she gives a warm contrast to the track's wintry atmosphere and a "comfy melody" from the Brothers Johnson's "Strawberry Letter 23". Eddy also described Cyhi the Prynce's verse as promising "presents for non-Christian kiddies".

Rose Lilah of HotNewHipHop wrote that "Christmas in Harlem" serves as a "worthy addition to a respectable catalogue that has seen a lot of growth" since West's debut. Teen Vogue gave a positive reception to the track, writing that it's a "fun and somewhat bluesy track" based on West's "wry, clever takes on quintessential Christmas antics." Commercially, "Christmas in Harlem" debuted and peaked at number three on the Bubbling Under R&B/Hip-Hop Singles, number eight on the Holiday Digital Song Sales, and number thirteen on the US Bubbling Under Hot 100 Singles charts respectively on the week ending January 8, 2011.

Andy Greene of Rolling Stone later included the song in its list of "The Greatest Rock & Roll Christmas Songs", describing it favorably as a follow-up to "Christmas in Hollis" (1987), a similarly themed Christmas song by hip-hop group Run-DMC. Crediting contributions from Teyana Taylor, Cam'ron, Jim Jones, and Pusha T, Greene considered West's vision of the song to paint "a vivid and cheerful portrait of the season." In 2019, Complex writer Shawn Setaro ranked "Christmas in Harlem" as the eleventh-best GOOD Friday song, considering it to be a "true holiday treasure".

== Personnel ==
Credits are adapted from Tidal.

- Kanye West – lead artist, vocals, writing
- Cydel Young – featured artist, vocals, writing
- Teyana Taylor – featured artist, vocals
- Chauncey Hollis – writing, production
- Marvin Gaye – writing
- Shuggie Otis – writing
- Mike Dean – mixing, recording engineer
- Noah Goldstein – recording engineer

== Charts ==
Chart performance for "Christmas in Harlem"
Chart (2011)	Peak position
US Bubbling Under Hot 100 (Billboard)	13
US Bubbling Under R&B/Hip-Hop Singles (Billboard)	3
US Holiday Digital Song Sales (Billboard)	8
