= We Got Love (Teyana Taylor song) =

Single by Teyana Taylor (solo or featuring Ms. Lauryn Hill)

from the album The Album
- Released: December 6, 2019; March 12, 2020 (rerelease)
- Recorded: 2018
- Studio: West Lake Ranch, Jackson Hole, Wyoming
- Label: GOOD; Def Jam
- Songwriters: Teyana Taylor; Brittany Coney; Denisia Andrews; Kanye West; Mike Dean; Jahmal Gwin; Evan Mast; Stephen Feigenbaum; Marcus Vest; Ronald Preyer; Vernon Bullock; Charles Ingersoll; Robert Solomon; Lauryn Hill (remix)
- Producers: Kanye West; Mike Dean; Seven Aurelius; E*vax; BoogzDaBeast; Johan Lenox

Teyana Taylor singles chronology
"Morning" (2019)	"We Got Love" (2019)	"Made It / Bare Wit Me" (2020)

Lauryn Hill singles chronology
"Coming Home" (2019)	"We Got Love" (2020)	"Save the Day" (2020)

Music video
- "We Got Love" on YouTube

"We Got Love" is a song by American singer-songwriter Teyana Taylor released as a single on December 6, 2019. A version featuring Lauryn Hill was released on March 13, 2020.

== Background ==
"We Got Love" was originally intended for Taylor's second studio album K.T.S.E.. The track leaked online in June 2018 with a spoken word outro performed by Lauryn Hill. "We Got Love" was later intended to be included on Kanye West's ninth studio album Yandhi. Taylor and West performed the song as a duet during the season 44 premiere of Saturday Night Live to promote the album, which failed to release. West and Taylor then recorded a music video for "We Got Love" in the TMZ parking lot, which was never released.

On December 5, 2019, Taylor announced through Instagram that "We Got Love" would be released on streaming services at midnight.

== Personnel ==
Credits adapted from Tidal.

- Kanye West – production
- BoogzDaBeast – co-production
- E*vax – co-production
- Mike Dean – production
- Johan Lenox – additional production, string arrangement, programming
- Seven Aurelius – production, keyboards
- Yasmeen Al-Mazeedi – violin

== Charts ==
Chart (2019)	Peak position
New Zealand Hot Singles (RMNZ)	33
