= Teyana Taylor =

American singer and actress (born 1990)

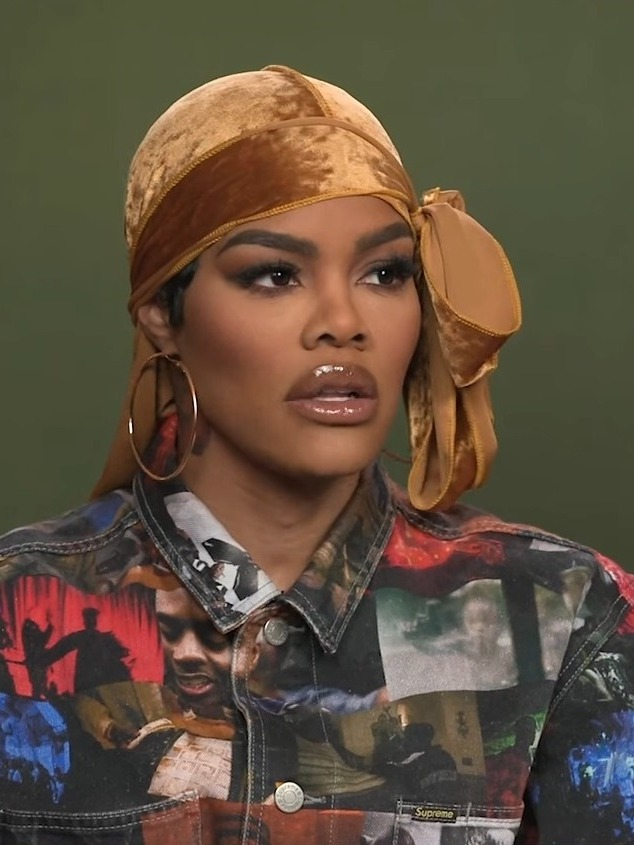
- Taylor in 2023
- Born: Teyana Me Shay Jacqueline Taylor; December 10, 1990 (age 35); New York City, U.S.
- Other names: Spike Tee; Jimmy Neutch
- Occupations: Actress; singer; songwriter; dancer; music video director; choreographer
- Years active: 2006–present
- Works: Discography; filmography
- Spouse: Iman Shumpert (m. 2016; div. 2024)
- Children: 2
- Awards: Full list
- Musical career
- Genres: R&B; hip hop; pop
- Instrument: Vocals
- Labels: Def Jam; GOOD; Star Trak; Interscope
- Website: teyanataylor.com

Teyana Me Shay Jacqueline Taylor (/tiˈɑːnə/; born December 10, 1990) is an American singer, songwriter, actress, dancer, choreographer, and music video director. Her accolades include a Golden Globe Award, two Critics Choice Awards, and an NAACP Image Award, along with nominations for an Academy Award, two Actor Awards, a British Academy Film Award, and a Grammy Award. She was named one of Time's 2026 Women of the Year.

At age 15, she choreographed the video for "Ring the Alarm" by Beyoncé and signed a recording contract with the Neptunes' Star Trak Entertainment. During this period, Taylor was featured as a dancer in the video for "Blue Magic" by Jay-Z and released her debut single, "Google Me." She earned wider recognition for work on Kanye West's "Dark Fantasy" and "Hell of a Life" from My Beautiful Dark Twisted Fantasy (2010).

In 2012, she signed with West's GOOD Music and appeared on the label's compilation album, Cruel Summer, which peaked at number two on the Billboard 200. Her debut studio album, VII (2014), topped the R&B/Hip-Hop Albums chart. Taylor starred in and co-choreographed "Fade" by Kanye West, earning the MTV Video Music Award for Best Choreography. She then released K.T.S.E. (2018), followed by The Album (2020), which entered the top ten on the Billboard 200 and featured collaborations with Missy Elliott and Lauryn Hill. Her fourth album, Escape Room (2025), received a Grammy Award nomination for Best R&B Album.

As an actress, Taylor appeared in films such as Stomp the Yard: Homecoming (2010) and Madea's Big Happy Family (2011), before taking on starring roles in Coming 2 America (2021) and The Rip (2026). She received critical acclaim for her portrayal of Inez in A Thousand and One (2023), earning the National Board of Review Award for Breakthrough Performance. For her performance in Paul Thomas Anderson's One Battle After Another (2025), she won a Golden Globe Award and received an Academy Award nomination for Best Supporting Actress. On television, she starred in the Ryan Murphy legal drama All's Fair (2025–present), and won an NAACP Image Award for her performance in the 2025 Netflix television film Straw.

Her other ventures include collaborations with Adidas and Air Jordan on limited-edition releases. Taylor has directed music videos for herself and other artists, and is set to make her feature directorial debut with Get Lite, starring actress Storm Reid, for Paramount Pictures.

== Early life ==
Teyana Taylor was born on December 10, 1990, to Nikki Taylor and Tito Smith, in Harlem, New York City. She is of African American and Trinidadian descent. Teyana is her mother's only child, while her father has two sons and another daughter from a different relationship. Her mother is also her manager.

== Career ==
=== 2006–2011: Early career ===
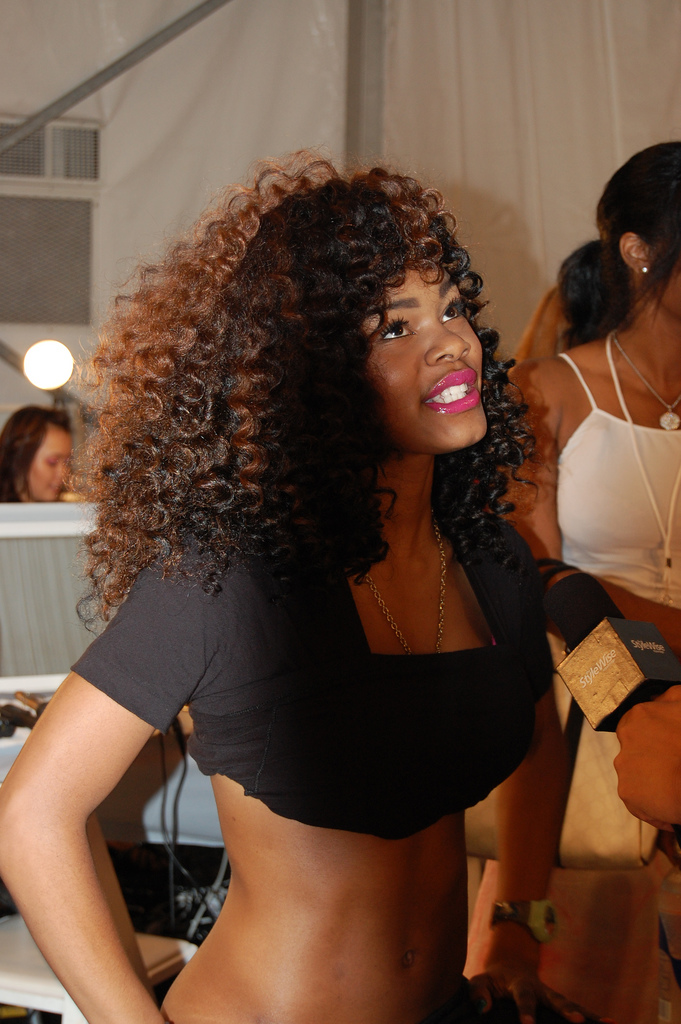
Taylor in 2008

In September 2006, 15-year-old Teyana Taylor was credited as the choreographer on the music video for American entertainer Beyoncé's hit single, "Ring the Alarm". In January 2007, Taylor was offered a contract to join Pharrell Williams' Star Trak Entertainment label, through Interscope Records. In February 2007, Taylor first entered into the public sphere through an episode on MTV's My Super Sweet Sixteen, a show depicting over-the-top birthday parties for rich—and typically "spoiled" and confrontational—teenagers. In 2007, Taylor appeared as a background dancer in the music video for Jay-Z's single, "Blue Magic".

In February 2008, Taylor released her commercial debut single, "Google Me". The song was released as the lead single from her full-length debut mixtape, titled From a Planet Called Harlem. The mixtape, released August 16, 2009, features production from Jazze Pha, Pharrell, Mad Scientist, Frost, Shondre and Hit-Boy, among others. "Google Me" debuted at number 90 on US Billboard's Hot R&B/Hip-Hop Songs. The mixtape was also released for free download, billed as "the mixtape before her debut album". In August 2010, Taylor expanded her career into acting, appearing in the Stomp the Yard 2: Homecoming. She also appeared on the debut episode of House of Glam on Oxygen in October 2010.

In 2010, just hours before Kanye West's fifth album My Beautiful Dark Twisted Fantasy was due to be turned in, West called Taylor into the studio to look over some of her fashion pieces. While in the studio, Taylor was determined to make an appearance on West's album. She purposely hummed along with the tracks he played for her, to get his attention. He eventually took notice, and asked to put her vocals on a few tracks, notably "Dark Fantasy" and "Hell of a Life". Upon recalling the experience of recording "Dark Fantasy", Taylor stated that "at the time it was pretty empty, just verses." She remembers that West "put [her] in another room by [herself] and said, 'Go'." Taylor came back with the "intro and chorus," and "did all the scratches and the cuts [herself]." She admitted that she was nervous upon letting West hear her contributions to the tracks, trying to cover her nervousness by stating that she "hadn't been in the studio for so long."

In 2010, Taylor contributed on one of GOOD Music's GOOD Friday tracks, "Christmas In Harlem". The track was released as a shortened version of the single to the iTunes Store on December 17, 2010, and features guest appearances from American rapper Cyhi the Prynce as well as Kanye West. In 2010, Taylor, alongside fellow rapper Bow Wow, were offered roles for Tyler Perry's play-turned-film Madea's Big Happy Family, the fifth installment in Perry's series. The film was released on April 22, 2011. Taylor was featured on the August 2011 Jim Jones single "Party Tonight" alongside Cam'ron.

=== 2012–2019: GOOD Music, debut and K.T.S.E. ===
In January 2012, it was announced Taylor would be granted her release from the contract with Interscope and Star Trak. Taylor has stated that she and Star Trak founder Pharrell Williams have remained amicable since the end of their business relationship. She has credited him as a "big brother", and sees her early signing to Star Trak as a "blessing." Taylor has stated on many occasions that her release from the label was necessary, as she wanted to have a feeling of independence in the music industry. In an interview with DJ Skee, Taylor mentioned that "when [she] was signed for six years, [she] felt like she couldn't do [anything]", "couldn't prove to [her] fans that [she] had the talent", and "couldn't sing from [her] heart." As an independent artist upon her release, she had begun preparing her second record, a mixtape titled The Misunderstanding of Teyana Taylor. The mixtape drew influences from 1990s R&B legends like Lauryn Hill and Mary J. Blige. The mixtape was released in early 2012, and was preceded by the release of "Make Your Move", featuring rapper Wale, and "D.U.I.", featuring Jadakiss & Fabolous, which was released on February 25, 2012. More positive reviews of the latter track noted that "The Harlem songstress channels Janet Jackson as she glides over the smooth Hit-Boy-produced beat with her airy vocals, while fellow New Yorkers Fabolous and Jadakiss ride shotgun".

After taking some time to find herself as an independent artist, Taylor signed a joint-venture deal with Kanye West's label GOOD Music through Island-Def Jam on June 14, 2012. As part of GOOD Music, Taylor appeared on the GOOD Music compilation album Cruel Summer, released September 18, 2012. She provides vocals for the opening track "To the World", with Kanye West and R. Kelly, provides the hook and chorus for "Sin City", which features John Legend, Cyhi the Prynce, Malik Yusef and Travis Scott, and also duets with John Legend on a song titled "Bliss". Taylor and Legend's duet on the album was highly praised, with Erika Ramirez of Billboard noting that "Taylor's beautifully brash voice ... illuminates in the electric-guitar heavy, Hudson Mohawke-produced 'Bliss'."

In addition to being featured on the Cruel Summer compilation, Taylor soon began the process of recording her major-label debut album, to be released eventually through GOOD Music and Island Def Jam. On July 27, 2014, via Twitter, Taylor announced the title of her debut studio album to be VII, and revealed it would be released on November 4, through Def Jam and GOOD Music. The album debuted at number 19 on the Billboard 200, selling 16,000 copies in the United States in its first week, while topping the R&B/Hip-Hop Albums chart.

In 2015, Taylor opened for Chris Brown on the U.S. leg of his "One Hell of a Nite" world tour. She later appeared as a judge on the eighth season of the competitive dance reality show America's Best Dance Crew, which debuted July 29, 2015, on MTV. On August 25, Taylor released The Cassette Tape 1994, paying tribute to the iconic 90s sound in music by including many samples from 90s hits.

On June 17, 2016, Taylor released her single "Freak On", featuring guest vocals from Chris Brown and production by DJ Mustard. It samples "Freak Like Me" by Adina Howard. Taylor announced that it would be the lead single from her upcoming second studio album. On August 28, 2016, at the MTV Video Music Awards, Kanye West debuted the music video for his new single "Fade", which featured a sweat-dripping, athletic Taylor performing a rigorous solo dance routine, in nothing more than short shorts and a simple top; the dynamic and detailed choreography drew considerable praise, and comparisons were made to Jennifer Beals' iconic dance scene from the film Flashdance (1983). A year later, in 2017, Taylor's dancing in the music video would go on to earn her the "Best Choreography" award at the same ceremony. The video, directed by Eli Russell Linnetz, also featured an appearance by Taylor's then-husband, Iman Shumpert. Taylor's album K.T.S.E., an acronym for "keep that same energy," was the last of G.O.O.D. Music's seven-song album rollout and was released on June 22, 2018. An updated version of the album was supposed to be released, but Taylor announced that plans were canceled for it.

Taylor released a collaboration single, "Morning", with fellow R&B singer Kehlani in November 2019. On December 6, 2019, Taylor released the single "We Got Love". On May 7, 2020, Taylor announced that her third studio album is titled The Album and would be released sometime in June 2020. It was released on June 19, with the 23-track album featuring guest appearances by Erykah Badu, Kehlani, Lauryn Hill, Future, Rick Ross, Quavo, and Missy Elliott. It debuted at number 8 on the Billboard 200, earning Taylor her first top 10 album.

=== 2020–present: Transition to film and other work ===
On December 4, 2020, Taylor seemingly announced her retirement from making music via her Instagram page. A few days later, she explained the post was directed at her record label as she continued clarifying her frustration with their lack of support, "Baby, I gotta do it for my mental health. I have to do it for my emotional health. I have to do it for my kids, so I can stay alive for my kids. Until I'm free, until I can get [Def Jam] to release me, yes I want to retire." She later said that much of the frustration leading to retirement could be traced back to her label undervaluing her, but she would not be retiring for good. For her starring performance in the 2023 film A Thousand and One, she won the Breakthrough Performance Award from the National Board of Review.

In March 2025, Taylor was featured on Will Smith's album Based on a True Story. On June 6, 2025, Taylor was featured on a remix to singer Ciara's single "Ecstasy", which also featured Normani. On August 22, 2025, Taylor released her fourth studio album, Escape Room, to acclaim, featuring production from Rico Love, The Runners, Kaytranada, Freaky Rob, and Derrick Milano, alongside narrated interludes by Issa Rae, Jill Scott, Taraji P. Henson, Jodie Turner-Smith, Kerry Washington, La La Anthony, Niecy Nash, Regina King, and Sarah Paulson. The album was accompanied by a 38-minute short film co-starring actors Aaron Pierre and LaKeith Stanfield, which was uploaded to YouTube.

In September 2025, Teyana Taylor delivered a breakout performance as Perfidia in One Battle After Another, a politically charged drama directed by Paul Thomas Anderson and starring Leonardo DiCaprio, Sean Penn, Benicio del Toro, Regina Hall, and Chase Infiniti. Taylor's character, a passionate and resilient member of a revolutionary group, also grapples with the emotional and physical toll of postpartum depression as she navigates motherhood. Her portrayal of Perfidia was widely praised for its depth and vulnerability, capturing both her character's strength and the rawness of her emotional struggles. Taylor's performance earned numerous accolades, including a win for the Golden Globe Award for Best Supporting Actress – Motion Picture, and nominations for the Critics' Choice Movie Award for Best Supporting Actress, Gotham Independent Film Award for Outstanding Supporting Performance, and Academy Award for Best Supporting Actress.

In February 2026, Taylor was featured on the cover of Time as the Woman of the Year. In June 2026, she was named Icon of the Year for the 2026 BET Awards. On July 12, Taylor performed "Can't Knock the Hustle" as a guest artist on the Jay-Z 30 Tour at Yankee Stadium in New York City.

== Other ventures ==
In 2013, Taylor signed a deal to design and release two pairs of sneakers with Adidas. The first pair released were the Harlem GLC's which hit stores February 16 the same year. According to Adidas Global Director of Entertainment and Influence Marketing, Jonathan Wexler, Taylor holds the record for fastest selling sneakers in Adidas Originals history. She then focused on designing and releasing her second pair of sneakers with the brand. In March 2017, Teyana Taylor launched her "Fade 2 Fit" Workout Program, a ninety-day workout which centers around dance and fitness routines. The inspiration for this program and the incorporated dance elements come from her work in the music video for Kanye West's "Fade". She released a line of workout apparel, also called Fade2Fit. In May 2019, Taylor featured and directed the music video for Lil Durk's remix of Home Body from his 2018 album Signed to the Streets 3.

In 2022, Taylor competed in season seven of The Masked Singer as "Firefly" of Team Good. During the finals, Taylor was declared the winner. At 31 years old, she became the youngest winner in the show's history, before being surpassed by Bishop Briggs, who competed as "Medusa" in season 9.

In February 2026, Taylor made public service announcements on the MTA New York City Transit subway and bus systems, advising riders to abstain from playing loud music in transit as a courtesy to others, and to instead use their headphones.

== Personal life ==
In 2011, Taylor was engaged to basketball player Brandon Jennings. The pair ended their relationship in 2013. That same year, Taylor began dating basketball player Iman Shumpert. They wed on October 1, 2016, and share two daughters, born in 2015 and 2020. In September 2023, Taylor announced the couple's separation via Instagram. Their divorce was finalized in 2024.

In July 2025, Taylor began her studies at Auguste Escoffier School of Culinary Arts.

In August 2025, Taylor underwent surgery to remove a noncancerous growth on her vocal cords.

== Discography ==
- VII (2014)
- K.T.S.E. (2018)
- The Album (2020)
- Escape Room (2025)

== Filmography ==
Key
†	Denotes productions that have not yet been released

=== Film ===
Year	Title	Role	Notes
2010	Stomp the Yard: Homecoming	Rena	
2011	Madea's Big Happy Family	Sabrina	
2012	Gang of Roses II: Next Generation	Candi Baxter	
2012	Cruel Summer	Don	Short film
2013	The Love Section	Steph	
2015	Brotherly Love	Zip	
2018	Honey: Rise Up and Dance	Skyler	
2018	The After Party	Bl'asia	
2019	The Trap	Sherri	
2021	Coming 2 America	Bopoto Izzi	
2023	A Thousand and One	Inez de la Paz	
2023	White Men Can't Jump	Imani	
2023	The Book of Clarence	Mary Magdalene	
2025	Straw	Detective Kay Raymond	
2025	One Battle After Another	Perfidia Beverly Hills	Nomination — Academy Award for Best Supporting Actress
2026	The Rip	Detective Numa Baptiste	
2026	Scary Movie	Herself	Cameo
2026	72 Hours	Jennifer	
2027	Get Lite †	—N/a	Filming; Director and producer
TBA	Slime †	TBA	In production; voice role

=== Television ===
Year	Title	Role	Notes
2007	My Super Sweet 16	Herself	Episode: "Teyana Taylor"
2008	It's Showtime at the Apollo	Herself	Episode: "Teyana Taylor"
2015	America's Best Dance Crew	Herself	Season 8; Judge
2016	Fashion Police	Herself	Episode: "2016 American Music Awards"
2017	The Breaks	Imani X	Recurring cast
2017	Ridiculousness	Herself	Episode: "Teyana Taylor"
2017–2018	Hip Hop Squares	Herself	4 episodes
2017–2018	Star	Joyce Sheree	Recurring cast: season 2, guest: season 3
2018	Hit the Floor	London Scott	Main cast: season 4
2018	The Hollywood Puppet Show	Herself	Episode: "Teyana Taylor and Jhene Aiko"
2018	The Tonight Show Starring Jimmy Fallon	Herself	Episode: "Daniel Radcliffe/Matt Czuchry/Teyana Taylor/Aerosmith"
2018	The Real	Herself	Episode: "Teyana Taylor/Special Expanded Girl Chat/Snitched"
2018	Saturday Night Live	Herself	Episode: "Adam Driver/Kanye West"
2018	Teyana & Iman	Herself	Main cast
2019	Complex Con(versations)	Herself	Episode: "Women in Streetwear"
2019	The Ellen DeGeneres Show	Herself	Episode: "Lily Tomlin/Rob Delaney/Sharon Horgan/Teyana Taylor"
2019	Rhythm + Flow	Herself	Episode: "Collaborations"
2020	Barkitecture	Herself	Episode: "Teyana Taylor: Doggy Duplex"
2021	We Got Love Teyana & Iman	Herself	Main cast
2021	Dancing with the Stars	Herself	Episode: "Grease Night"
2022	The Masked Singer	Herself	Contestant and winner on Season 7
2022	Entergalactic	Boxing Coach (voice)	TV special
2025–present	All's Fair	Milan	Main cast
2026	Saturday Night Live	Herself	Episode: "Teyana Taylor/Geese"

== Awards and nominations ==
Taylor has worked across film, music, and choreography. Beginning her career as a choreographer for Beyoncé's 2006 music video "Ring the Alarm", she later won Best Dance Performance at the Soul Train Music Awards and Best Choreography at the MTV Video Music Awards for her work on Kanye West's "Fade" (2016). As a music video director, she has worked with Schoolboy Q, Ty Dolla Sign, Monica, and Lil Durk. She has won the BET Award for Video Director of the Year in 2020 and 2023, tying with Benny Boom for second-most wins in the category, behind Beyoncé.

Her acting breakthrough came with her performance in A Thousand and One (2023). For the role, she won Best Breakthrough Performance from the National Board of Review and received nominations from the Independent Spirit Awards, the Gotham Independent Film Awards, and the NAACP Image Awards.

In 2025, she was named Entertainer of the Year at the Ebony Power 100. Her album Escape Room received a Grammy Award nomination, while her performance in the Netflix film Straw earned a nomination from the NAACP Image Awards. That same year, she starred in the film One Battle After Another and received Best Supporting honors from two of the three major critics groups: the Los Angeles Film Critics Association and the National Society of Film Critics. She was also the only performer that season nominated for Best Supporting Actress at the Academy Awards, Critics' Choice Movie Awards, Golden Globe Awards, Actor Awards, and BAFTA Awards, winning the Golden Globe. In 2026, Time named her one of the most influential Women of the Year.

== See also ==
- List of American Grammy Award winners and nominees
- List of actors with Academy Award nominations
- List of black Academy Award winners and nominees
- List of black Golden Globe Award winners and nominees
- List of people from Harlem
