= Kesington Kross =

KES
- Born: Kesington Kross; Orange County, California
- Genres: R&B
- Occupations: Singer-songwriter record producer
- Labels: Epic Records; LaFace Records
- Website: kesingtonkross.com

Kesington Kross (better known by his stage name KES) is an American singer-songwriter and Record producer from Los Angeles, California.

== Early life ==
KES was born in Orange County, California and grew up in Compton.

== Music career ==
The music style of KES has been compared to that of Joel Compass and Frank Ocean, with mixes of rock-n-roll, R&B, and Rave. Vibe compared him to David Bowie, Depeche Mode, Phil Collins, Rick James and Prince, stating that listeners would become "obsessed" with his music.

KES was originally discovered by Babyface during a writing session. He was then introduced to L.A. Reid of Epic Records and signed jointly by Epic and LaFace Records, a label founded by Babyface and Reid in 1989. The signing was the first time in 25 years that Babyface and Reid jointly signed a musician. He released his first EP titled Audio Justice with Epic/LaFace in December 2013.

== Discography ==
=== Singles ===
- 2014, Gimme Your Love
- 2013, Arabian Paradise

=== Extended plays ===
- 2013, Audio Justice
