= Iman Shumpert =

American basketball player and actor (born 1990)

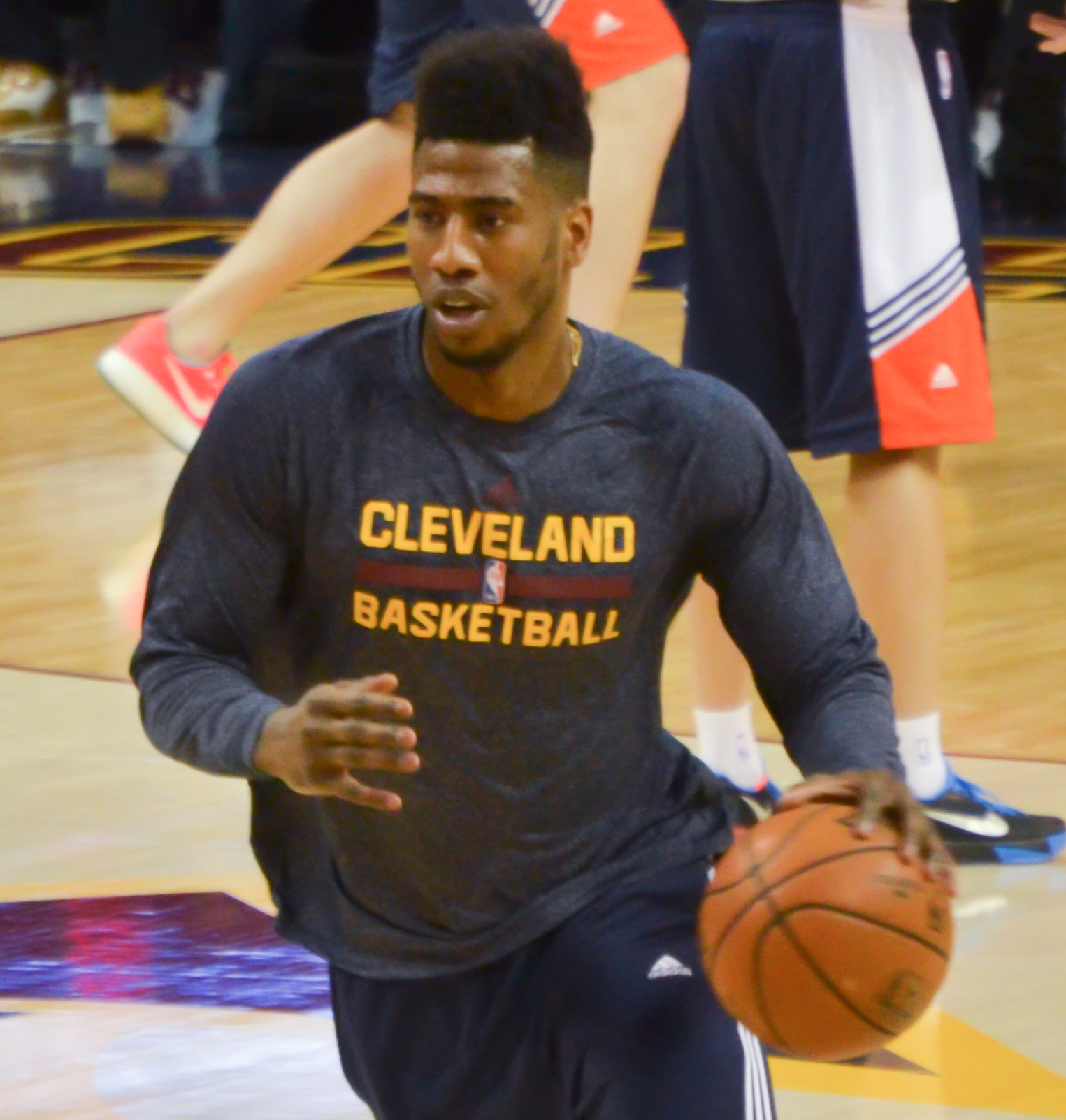
- Shumpert with the Cleveland Cavaliers in 2015

Personal information
- Born: June 26, 1990 (age 36) Berwyn, Illinois, U.S.
- Listed height: 6 ft 5 in (1.96 m)
- Listed weight: 212 lb (96 kg)

Career information
- High school: Oak Park and River Forest (Oak Park, Illinois)
- College: Georgia Tech (2008–2011)
- NBA draft: 2011: 1st round, 17th overall pick
- Drafted by: New York Knicks
- Playing career: 2011–2021
- Position: Shooting guard / small forward
- Number: 21, 4, 9, 1, 10

Career history
- 2011–2015: New York Knicks
- 2015–2018: Cleveland Cavaliers
- 2018–2019: Sacramento Kings
- 2019: Houston Rockets
- 2019, 2021: Brooklyn Nets

Career highlights
- NBA champion (2016); NBA All-Rookie First Team (2012); Second-team All-ACC (2011); ACC All-Defensive Team (2011); ACC All-Freshman Team (2009); McDonald's All-American (2008); Third-team Parade All-American (2008)
- Stats at NBA.com
- Stats at Basketball Reference

Iman Asante Shumpert (/iˈmɑːn/ ee-MAHN; born June 26, 1990) is an American former professional basketball player in the National Basketball Association (NBA). He played college basketball for the Georgia Tech Yellow Jackets and was selected by the New York Knicks with the 17th overall pick in the 2011 NBA draft. Shumpert was traded to the Cleveland Cavaliers in 2015 and won an NBA championship with them in 2016. He also had stints with the Sacramento Kings, Houston Rockets, and Brooklyn Nets.

Shumpert won season 30 of Dancing with the Stars with professional dancer Daniella Karagach in 2021, making him the first NBA player to win the finale.

== Early life ==
Shumpert was born on June 26, 1990, in Berwyn, Illinois. Shumpert's father, Odis Wayne Shumpert (January 24, 1954 – October 27, 2025), was an insurance broker while his mother, L'Tanya, is an adjunct professor of art and design at Columbia College in Chicago, Illinois. In the eighth grade, he and fellow NBA player Evan Turner were teammates on the same basketball team at Gwendolyn Brooks Middle School in Oak Park, Illinois. Shumpert went on to attend Oak Park and River Forest High School, where he was a first team all-state player and was one of the nation's top 30 seniors. Shumpert helped Oak Park and River Forest to three conference titles and was named conference MVP as a junior and senior. He was rated No. 15 among the nation's senior players by Scout.com and No. 26 by Rivals.com. Shumpert was also selected to play in the 2008 McDonald's All-American Game and was named a third-team Parade All-American.

== College career ==
As a freshman for Georgia Tech in 2008–09, Shumpert was the team's fourth-leading scorer for the season, averaging 10.5 points per game and hitting 34.5 percent of his three-point attempts.

During the 2009–10 season, Shumpert underwent arthroscopic surgery to repair a damaged meniscus in his right knee on December 3 and missed six games. Shumpert went on to finish the season as the team's third-leading scorer with 10.0 points per game.

In the 2010–11 season, Shumpert led his team in scoring (17.3 ppg), rebounding, and assists, becoming only the seventh player in ACC history to do so. He ranked fourth in the ACC in scoring, 15th in rebounds, 10th in field goal and free throw percentage, and first in steals (seventh in the nation). Shumpert was named to the All-ACC second team and was a member of the conference's all-defensive team. He also holds the Georgia Tech record for steals per game.

On March 28, 2011, Shumpert declared for the NBA draft, foregoing his final year of college eligibility.

== NBA career ==
=== New York Knicks (2011–2015) ===
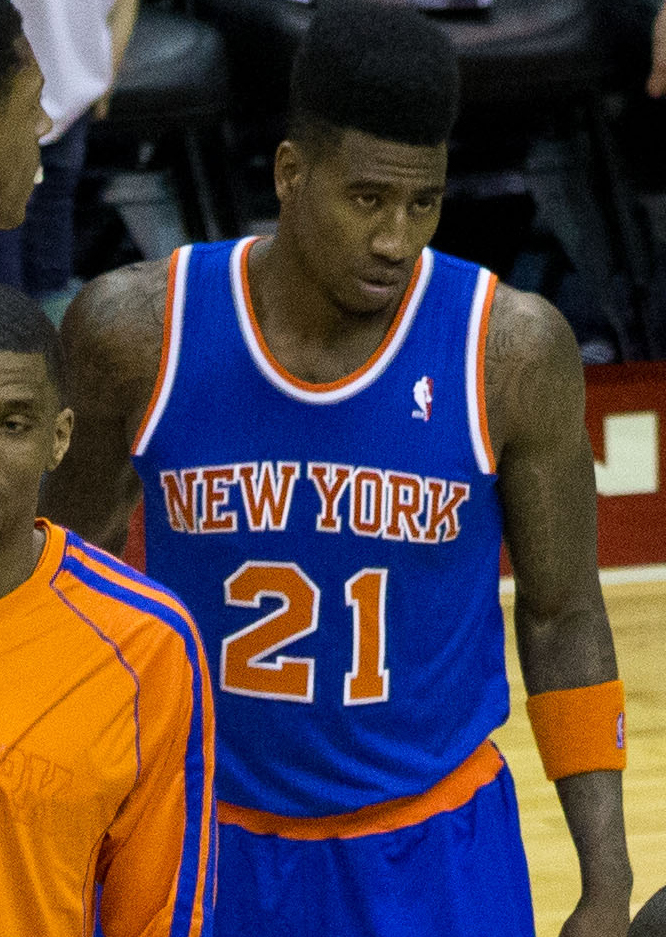
Shumpert in March 2013

Shumpert was drafted with the 17th overall pick in the 2011 NBA draft by the New York Knicks. In February 2012, then-teammate Jared Jeffries said that "he's about as good an on-ball defender as there is in the league right now". Shumpert was selected to compete in the 2012 NBA All-Star Weekend Slam Dunk Contest but was unable to participate due to a knee injury.

On April 28, 2012, during a first round playoff game against the Miami Heat, Shumpert suffered a knee injury while dribbling in midcourt and was immediately helped off the court. An MRI later revealed that Shumpert tore his left ACL and meniscus and would miss the rest of the season.

Shumpert finished fifth in the 2012 NBA Rookie of the Year voting. He received 33 total votes and one first-place vote from a ballot that was filled out by 120 writers and broadcasters from across the country. Shumpert was also the only rookie to receive votes for the Defensive Player of the Year award.

On January 13, 2013, Shumpert was medically cleared to participate in team practice. He made his season debut four days later in a game against the Detroit Pistons at The O2 Arena in London. He went on to record eight points, three rebounds, an assist, a steal, and a block.

In July 2013, Shumpert played one summer league game for the Knicks, recording two points, six rebounds, and four assists in a 77–72 loss to the New Orleans Pelicans. He made 45 total starts for New York during the 2012–13 NBA season, recording averages of 6.8 points, 3.0 rebounds, and 1.7 assists.

On December 12, 2014, Shumpert dislocated his left shoulder in the second quarter of the Knicks' 101–95 victory over the Boston Celtics and was subsequently ruled out for three weeks. Shumpert logged 74 appearances (including 58 starts) for the Knicks in the 2013–14 season, averaging 6.7 points, 4.2 rebounds, and 1.7 assists.

=== Cleveland Cavaliers (2015–2018) ===
On January 5, 2015, Shumpert was traded to the Cleveland Cavaliers from the Knicks in a three-team trade that also involved the Oklahoma City Thunder. Cleveland received Shumpert and J. R. Smith from the Knicks and a first round pick in the 2015 NBA draft from the Thunder, while Cleveland sent Dion Waiters to Oklahoma City and Lou Amundson, Alex Kirk, and a second round pick in the 2019 NBA draft to the Knicks, and the Thunder sent Lance Thomas to the Knicks.

On January 23, Shumpert made his debut for the Cavaliers, recording eight points, two rebounds, and two assists in the 129–90 victory over the Charlotte Hornets. The Cavaliers made it to the 2015 NBA Finals, but they lost to the Golden State Warriors in six games despite a 2–1.

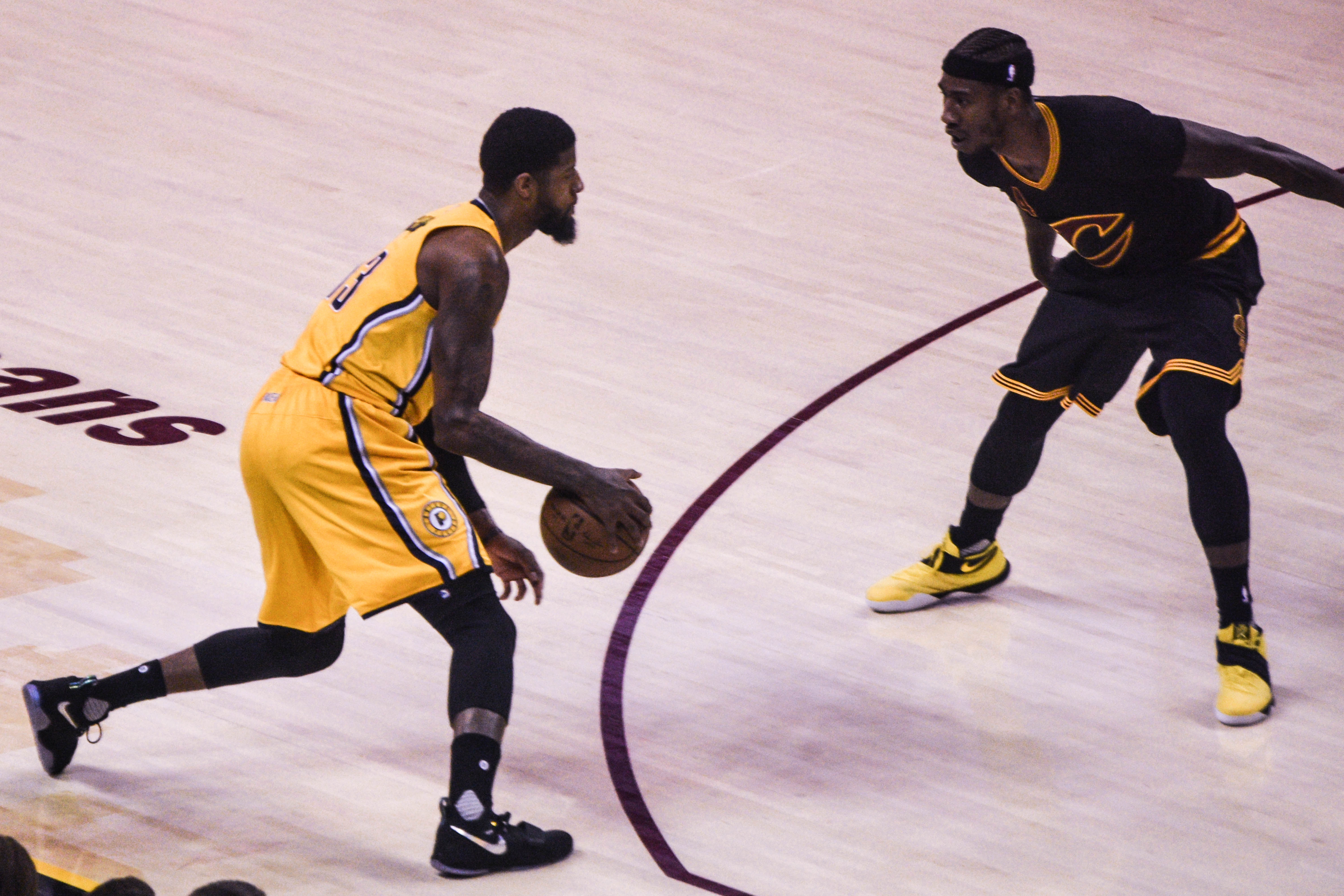
Shumpert defending Paul George in 2017

On July 9, 2015, Shumpert re-signed with the Cavaliers to a four-year, $40 million contract. On September 29, he was ruled out for three months after suffering a ruptured Extensor Carpi Ulnaris sheath in his right wrist. Shumpert made his season debut on December 11 against the Orlando Magic, scoring 14 points off the bench in the 111–76 victory. On March 5, 2016, he recorded 12 points and a career-high 16 rebounds off the bench in a 120–103 victory over the Boston Celtics. On April 11, Shumpert was ruled out for the Cavaliers' final two games of the regular season after getting his left knee drained. Shumpert returned in time for the playoffs and helped the Cavaliers make it to the NBA Finals for the second straight season. The Cavaliers would again face the Golden State Warriors. Despite the Cavaliers going down 3–1 in the series following a Game 4 loss, they went on to win the series in seven games to become the first team in NBA history to win the NBA Finals after being down 3–1.

Cavaliers' coach Tyronn Lue started using Shumpert at backup point guard early on in the 2016–17 season. On March 14, 2017, he scored a season-high 18 points in a 128–96 victory over the Detroit Pistons. Shumpert helped the Cavaliers go 12–1 over the first three rounds of the playoffs to reach the NBA Finals for the third straight season. There, the Cavaliers matched up with the Warriors again, but lost the series in five games.

On December 1, 2017, Shumpert was ruled out for six to eight weeks following surgery on his left knee. Shumpert returned to action on January 23, 2018, against the San Antonio Spurs.

=== Sacramento Kings (2018–2019) ===
On February 8, 2018, Shumpert was acquired by the Sacramento Kings from the Cavaliers in a three-team trade that also involved the Utah Jazz. Despite not playing for the Kings in 2017–18, he opted in for the final year of his contract on June 8.

Shumpert made his debut for the Kings on October 17, 2018, recording five points and three rebounds in 18 minutes off the bench in the 123–117 season-opening loss to the Utah Jazz. Four days later, Shumpert scored 16 of his 26 points in the first quarter of the 131–120 victory over the Oklahoma City Thunder. On November 19, he scored 21 of his 23 points in the first half of the 117–113 victory over the Thunder. On December 27, he scored 18 points and matched his career high with six three-pointers in a narrow 117–116 victory win over the Los Angeles Lakers.

=== Houston Rockets (2019) ===
On February 7, 2019, Shumpert was acquired by the Houston Rockets in a three-team trade. The Rockets sent a 2020 second round pick to the Kings, as well as Brandon Knight, Marquese Chriss, and a 2019 first round draft pick to the Cleveland Cavaliers.

=== Brooklyn Nets (2019; 2021) ===
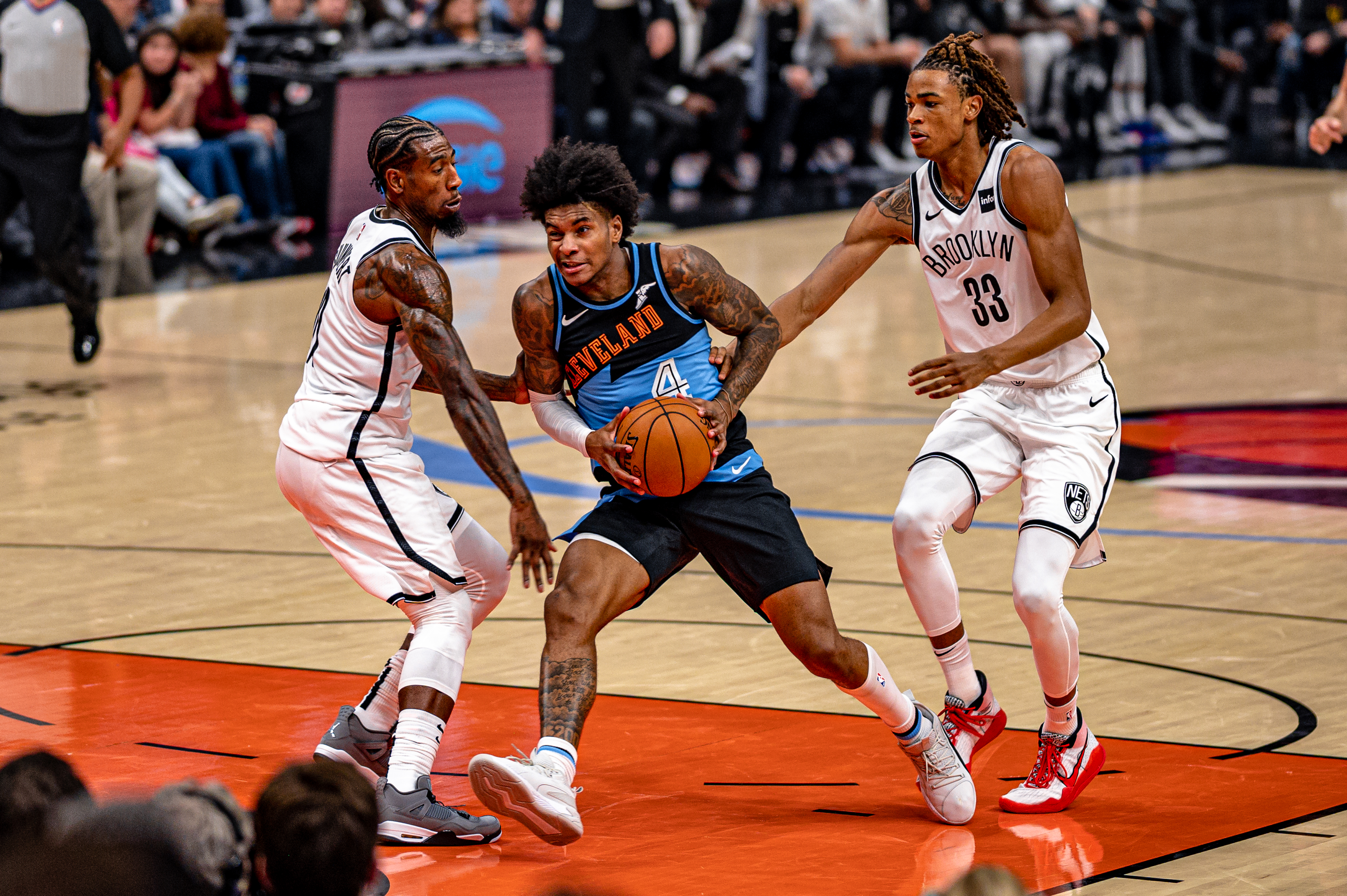
Shumpert guards Kevin Porter Jr. alongside teammate Nic Claxton in 2019

On November 13, 2019, Shumpert signed with the Brooklyn Nets, who had a roster exemption created by the 25-game performance-enhancing substance (PED) suspension to Wilson Chandler. On December 12, when Chandler's suspension expired, Shumpert was waived by the Nets.

On January 30, 2021, Shumpert signed a deal to return to Brooklyn. He was waived on February 23 and then re-signed to a 10-day contract three days later. Shumpert parted ways with the Nets upon expiration of the 10-day contract. He played two games for the Nets in that time.

== Other ventures ==
=== Music ===
Outside of basketball, Shumpert has dabbled in rap music. In 2012, he released the song "Knicks Anthem" and the mixtape Th3 #Post90s. In 2013, he released the song "Dear Kendrick" in response to Kendrick Lamar's verse on the song "Control" by Big Sean. The music video for Shumpert's 2014 single "Chiraq" garnered media attention for its eccentric visuals. In 2016, Shumpert released several singles including "His Story" and "Glory". In 2018, he released a 6-track EP titled Substance Abuse.

=== Television ===
In 2021, Shumpert won the 30th season of Dancing with the Stars with professional partner Daniella Karagach. In Week 6 of the 10-week elimination competition, the pair tied for the highest score with four 10's in the contemporary dance. The dance, choreographed by Karagach, went viral online and was regarded by fans as one of the best dances in the show's history. Shumpert is the only NBA player in Dancing with the Stars history to qualify for the finals and to win the competition.

In 2024, Shumpert portrayed Corey, a recurring character on season two of the Amazon Prime Video horror series Them.

== Personal life ==
During the 2012–13 NBA season, Shumpert's high-top fade haircut attracted publicity. He shaved the fade in October 2013. Shumpert's aunt Carolyn died from pancreatic cancer in 2012.

In 2016, Shumpert married singer and actress Teyana Taylor. They divorced in 2024, and share two daughters: Iman Tayla "Junie" Shumpert Jr. (born 2015) and Rue Rose Shumpert (born 2020). Junie was delivered by Shumpert at their home when Taylor unexpectedly went into labor.

== Career statistics ==
Legend
GP	Games played	GS	Games started	MPG	Minutes per game
FG%	Field goal percentage	3P%	3-point field goal percentage	FT%	Free throw percentage
RPG	Rebounds per game	APG	Assists per game	SPG	Steals per game
BPG	Blocks per game	PPG	Points per game	**Bold**	Career high
†	Won an NBA championship

=== NBA ===
==== Regular season ====
Year	Team	GP	GS	MPG	FG%	3P%	FT%	RPG	APG	SPG	BPG	PPG
2011–12	New York	59	35	**28.9**	.401	.306	.798	3.2	2.8	**1.7**	.1	**9.5**
2012–13	New York	45	45	22.1	.396	**.402**	.766	3.0	1.7	1.0	.2	6.8
2013–14	New York	74	**58**	26.5	.378	.333	.746	**4.2**	1.7	1.2	.2	6.7
2014–15	New York	24	24	26.0	.409	.348	.676	3.4	**3.3**	1.3	.1	9.3
2014–15	Cleveland	38	1	24.2	.410	.338	.667	3.8	1.5	1.3	.3	7.2
2015–16†	Cleveland	54	5	24.4	.374	.295	.784	3.8	1.7	1.0	.4	5.8
2016–17	Cleveland	**76**	31	25.5	**.411**	.360	.789	2.9	1.4	.8	.4	7.5
2017–18	Cleveland	14	6	19.7	.379	.269	.733	2.9	1.2	.6	.4	4.4
2018–19	Sacramento	42	40	26.2	.382	.366	**.829**	3.1	2.2	1.1	**.5**	8.9
2018–19	Houston	20	1	19.1	.347	.296	.500	2.7	1.1	.6	.2	4.6
2019–20	Brooklyn	13	0	18.5	.328	.242	.571	2.6	.9	.9	.2	4.2
2020–21	Brooklyn	2	0	5.5	.250	.000	—	.5	.0	.5	.0	1.0
Career		461	246	24.9	.391	.337	.764	3.3	1.8	1.1	.3	7.2

==== Playoffs ====
Year	Team	GP	GS	MPG	FG%	3P%	FT%	RPG	APG	SPG	BPG	PPG
2012	New York	1	1	19.0	.000	.000	.000	1.0	.0	1.0	.0	.0
2013	New York	12	12	28.1	.410	**.429**	**.857**	**6.0**	**1.3**	1.1	.3	**9.3**
2015	Cleveland	20	**16**	**34.8**	.360	.355	.750	4.9	1.2	**1.3**	**.8**	9.1
2016†	Cleveland	**21**	0	17.3	**.462**	.382	.636	2.2	.8	.5	.1	3.3
2017	Cleveland	17	0	16.2	.417	.385	.824	2.8	.9	.6	.2	4.4
2019	Houston	8	0	13.6	.385	.364	.250	1.5	.3	.1	.0	3.6
Career		79	29	22.8	.388	.376	.744	3.5	.9	.8	.3	5.9

=== College ===
Year	Team	GP	GS	MPG	FG%	3P%	FT%	RPG	APG	SPG	BPG	PPG
2008–09	Georgia Tech	31	31	31.6	.391	.314	.656	3.9	5.0	2.1	0.2	10.6
2009–10	Georgia Tech	30	29	30.1	.385	.333	.720	3.6	4.0	1.9	0.2	10.0
2010–11	Georgia Tech	31	31	32.0	.406	.278	.806	5.9	3.5	2.7	0.2	17.3
Career		92	91	31.3	.396	.305	.738	4.5	4.2	2.3	0.2	12.7

== Discography ==
=== EPs ===
List of extended plays with selected details
Title	Details	Peak chart positions
Title	Details	US
Substance Abuse	Released: April 13, 2018; Label: Iman Shumpert; Formats: Digital download, CD	—
