= Fade (Kanye West song) =

2016 single by Kanye West

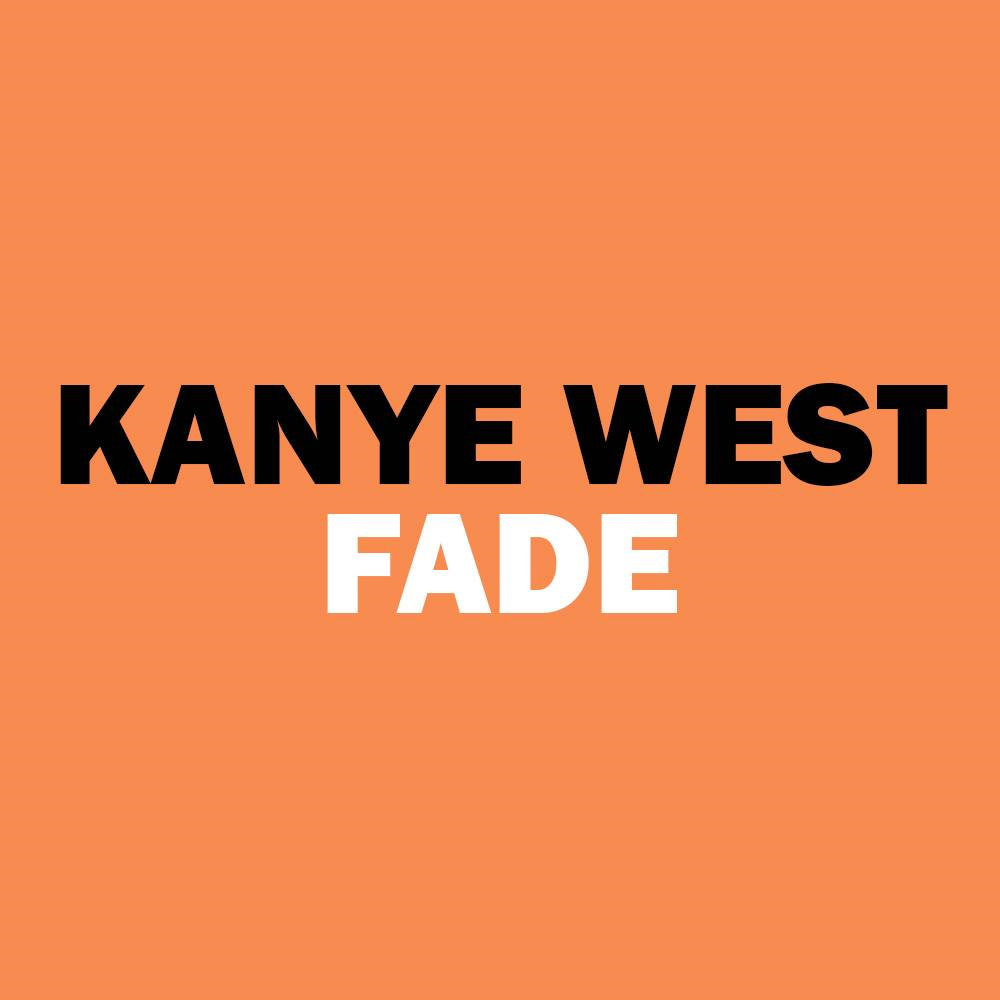

Single by Kanye West featuring Post Malone and Ty Dolla Sign

from the album The Life of Pablo
- Released: September 9, 2016
- Recorded: 2014–2016
- Genre: Hip house
- Length: 3:13
- Label: GOOD; Def Jam
- Songwriters: Kanye West; Tyrone Griffin; Austin Post; Anthony Kilhoffer; Michael Dean; Ryan Vojtesak; Noah Goldstein; Benjamin Benstead; Jerome Potter; Samuel Griesemer; Norman Whitfield; Edward Holland; Cornelius Grant; Larry Heard; Robert Owens; Luis Vega; Ronald Carroll; Barbara Tucker; Harold Matthews; Stephan Garrett; Eric Seats; Rapture Stewart; Malik Jones
- Producer: Kanye West

Kanye West singles chronology
"Friends" (2016)	"Fade" (2016)	"Ballin" (2016)

Music video
- "Fade" on YouTube

"Fade" is a song by American rapper Kanye West from his seventh studio album, The Life of Pablo (2016). The song features vocals from Post Malone and Ty Dolla Sign. It was first played at West's Yeezy Season 2 show in September 2015, before later being released for digital download and streaming as the third and final single from the album on September 9, 2016, through GOOD Music and Def Jam. 11 days later, the aforementioned labels serviced the song to radio stations across the United States. A hip house song with club elements, it samples Mr. Fingers's "Mystery of Love", Rare Earth's and The Undisputed Truth's respective cover versions of "(I Know) I'm Losing You", Hardrive's "Deep Inside", and Barbara Tucker's "I Get Lifted (The Underground Network Mix)". The lyrics of the song focus on trying to hold on to a fading love.

"Fade" received generally positive reviews from music critics, with many of them being complimentary towards the sampling. Some highlighted Ty Dolla Sign's and Post Malone's vocals, while other critics commented on the song's inclusion on The Life of Pablo. It was ranked amongst year-end lists for 2016 by multiple publications, including Spin and Billboard. In 2016, the song reached number 47 on the US Billboard Hot 100, alongside attaining fellow top 50 positions in Canada, France, Scotland, and the United Kingdom. The song has since been certified double platinum and gold in the US and the UK by the Recording Industry Association of America (RIAA) and British Phonographic Industry (BPI), respectively.

An accompanying music video was briefly made available as a Tidal exclusive on August 28, 2016, before being released to West's YouTube channel nine days later. Directed by Eli Russell Linnetz, the video features Teyana Taylor dancing, before she appears in a shower with her then husband, Iman Shumpert. The visual received positive reviews from critics, who often praised Taylor's dancing. At the 2017 MTV Video Music Awards, it received the award for Best Choreography. West performed "Fade" live with the Sunday Service Choir throughout 2019, including respective performances from him and them at the Coachella Valley Music and Arts Festival. Ty Dolla Sign expanded on the song with "Ego Death", which was released in July 2020.

A reinterpretation of the song with "Follow Me" by Aly-Us entitled "Follow Me – Faith" was released on the Sunday Service Choir's debut studio album, Jesus Is Born (2019). A two-part gospel track, the reinterpretation begins with a riff off the latter of the two songs before transitioning into a version of "Fade", titled "Faith". The group lead listeners to Christianity in the first part, while the second part's lyrics are focused on God's love. The reinterpretation received positive reviews from music critics, some of whom were complimentary towards the composition. Others appreciated the reinterpretation's development of the original songs, while a few critics cited it as one of the album's highlights. The reinterpretation peaked at number 22 on the US Billboard Gospel Songs chart in 2020.

== Background and recording ==
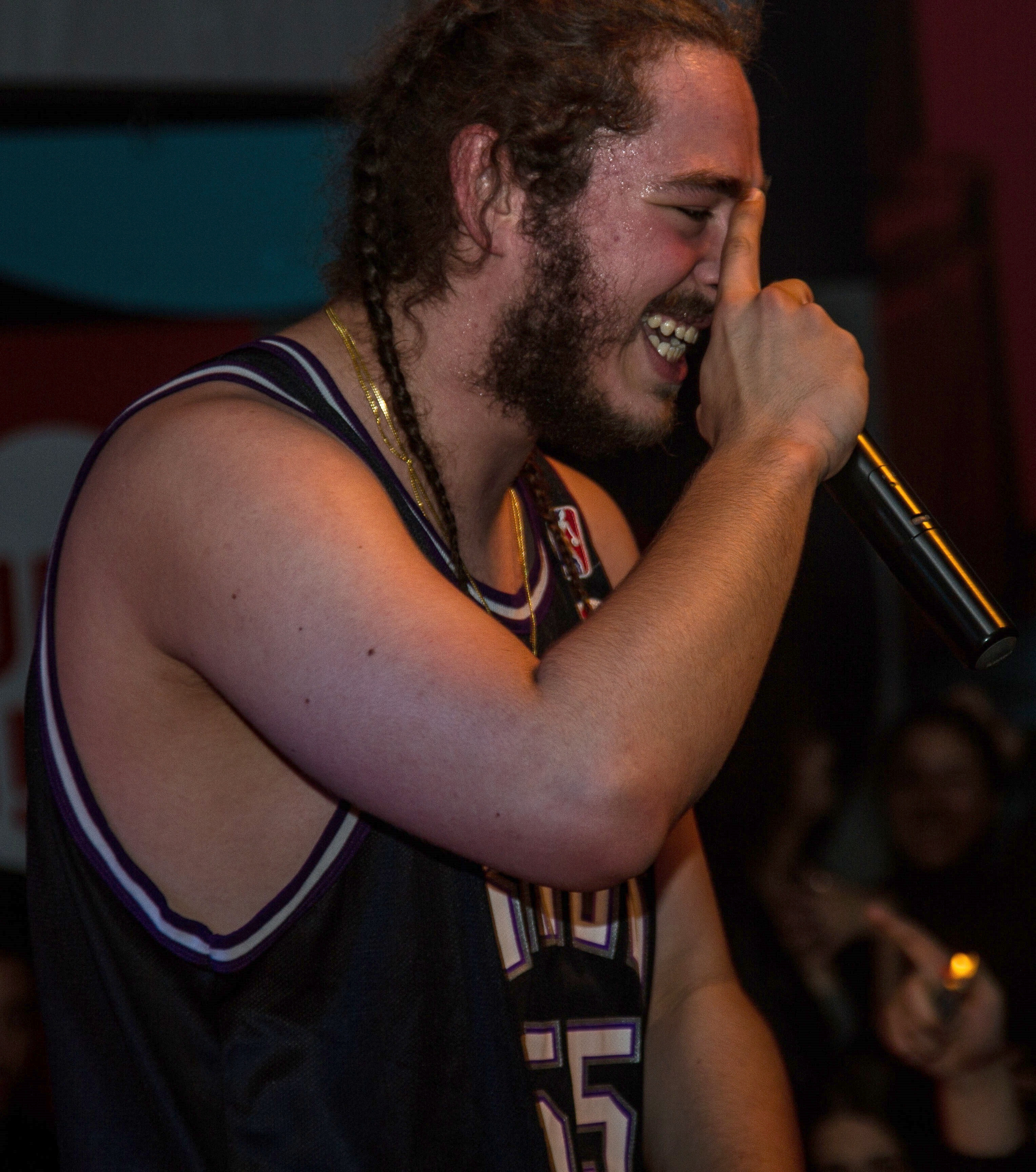
Post Malone worked with West on the song after meeting him at a party held by Kylie Jenner.

In October 2015, American rapper Post Malone revealed he first met West at a party thrown by West's sister-in-law Kylie Jenner. He recalled that West was eager to "make something" with him, which led to Post Malone going over to his, where the two worked together and talked. Elaborating, he said "we just kept on going. I went in the studio with Kanye and we just recorded the scratch vocals and then I wrote over it." Post Malone described West as "just a normal guy, like me," as well as "super cool," "very quiet" and "very, very humble." He later stated that the song "was just a dope vibe, a little funky vibe," viewing it as trying something new. Post Malone continued, admitting: "You never really know what to expect, but [Kanye] played me the song, or he sent me the song so I could hear it." According to him, he "got in the actual studio" with West after recording his scratch vocal "and actually cut the real vocals" for "Fade". Of collaborating with West on the song, American musician Ty Dolla Sign said it was "amazing" working with him and labeled West "one of the dopest musicians I know." Ty Dolla Sign asserted that when the two "actually got in the studio, it was dope," admitting they came up with the song in five minutes. He continued, recounting that West "did the beat on the spot, like from scratch."

At West's Yeezy Season 2 runway show on September 16, 2015 for New York Fashion Week, he debuted a new song. The song was played over video footage that showed people lined up in lines in a manner reminiscent of 1984 and various celebrities were in attendance for the debut, including Drake, Common, 2 Chainz, and Pusha T. After it leaked following the debut, Post Malone subsequently confirmed him and Ty Dolla Sign appear on the song while Pitchfork reported that it is titled "Fade". (Note: An early version of "Fade" was played during West's Yeezy Season 2 show.) By November 2015, two months after West had debuted the song at his Yeezy Season 2 show, the official audio was yet to be released and designer Virgil Abloh played "Fade" in full during a DJ set in London that month.

The song samples American DJ Larry Heard's recording "Mystery of Love", which is a house track that was released in 1985 under his moniker Mr. Fingers and co-written by him with Robert Owens. In response to West sampling the recording, Heard called "Fade" first appearing 30 years after its release "quite an interesting anniversary present" while noting that he and West share the hometown of Chicago. Heard was hopeful that the song's success would bring him new listeners, saying: "Every little thing that helps people who maybe don't hear any dance music, maybe just hear what's available via radio, maybe that opens something for them to Google search the name and look at the Discogs page and check out some things there." However, Heard was cautious of being associated solely with the recording's dancefloor friendly vibe due to stereotyping in the 1990s from Sony Music officials that he admitted "were like, 'doesn't he just do house music?" In the months following the February 2016 release of The Life of Pablo, West continuously made changes to the album; Def Jam referred to it as "a living, evolving art project." For "Fade", the production was mostly minimized.

== Composition and lyrics ==
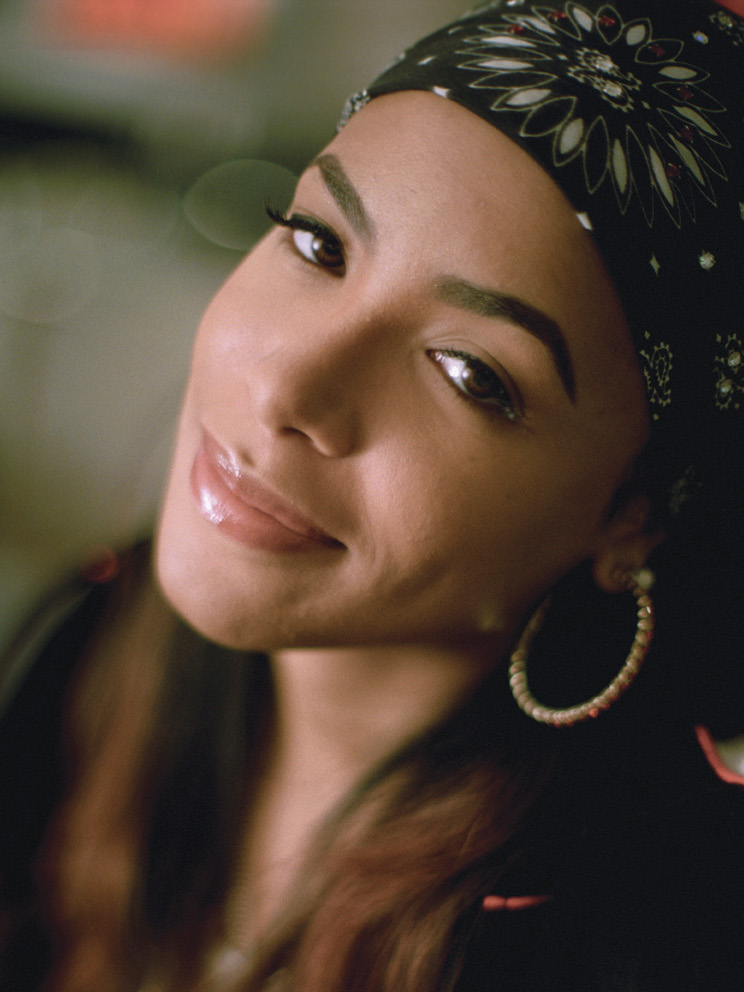
The song includes a posthumous interpolation of American singer Aaliyah's single "Rock the Boat" from West, who delivers the lyrics "I'ma rock the boat/Work the middle 'til it hurt a little."

Musically, "Fade" is a hip house song, with Chicago house influences. The majority of the production is minimal. The song is built around a slowed down sample of the bassline from "Mystery of Love", written by its performer Mr. Fingers alongside Owens. The vocals "Your love is fading/I feel it fade" from a 1970 cover version of the Temptations' "(I Know) I'm Losing You" (1966), written by Cornelius Grant, Eddie Holland and Norman Whitfield, and performed by Rare Earth, are sampled on the song. The song includes a sample of a version of the same title as Rare Earth's cover, written by the same musicians and performed by The Undisputed Truth. "Fade" contains vocal samples of "Deep Inside" (1993), written by Louie Vega and performed by Hardrive. The song features samples of "I Get Lifted (The Underground Network Mix)" (1994), written by Vega, Ron Carroll, Barbara Tucker and Harold Matthews, and performed by Tucker, which adds club elements. On the song, West, Ty Dolla Sign and Post Malone alternate verses. Post Malone contributes his vocals alongside the samples of Mr. Fingers' "Mystery of Love" and Rare Earth's "(I Know) I'm Losing You".

Lyrically, "Fade" centers around attempting to hold on to a love that is fading. The word "fade" is stretched out vocally. In West's verse, he expresses the urge to engage in sex with someone after having consumed marijuana or alcohol. West interpolates lyrics from "Rock the Boat" (2002), written by Stephen "Static Major" Garrett, Rapture Stewart and Eric Seats, and performed by Aaliyah.

== Release and reception ==
On February 14, 2016, "Fade" was released as the nineteenth track on West's seventh studio album The Life of Pablo. In June of that year, Def Jam confirmed the song was set to be released to contemporary hit radio stations across the United States. The song was released for digital download and streaming in various countries by West's record labels GOOD Music and Def Jam as the album's third single on September 9, 2016. That same day, it was serviced to UK mainstream radio stations. On September 20, 2016, the song was sent to US contemporary hit, rhythmic contemporary, and urban contemporary radio stations.

"Fade" was met with generally positive reviews from music critics, who mostly praised the sampling. Alexis Petridis from The Guardian said the song "woozily interleaves two house classics" in Mr. Fingers' "Mystery of Love" and "I Get Lifted" by Tucker "with a snatch of barked vocal" from "(I Know) I'm Losing You" by Rare Earth "to startling effect," concluding that the sampling is "proof that when The Life of Pablo is good, it's very good indeed." NOW Magazine's Kevin Ritchie noted that the song "pays homage to Chicago house classics." Greg Tate, writing for Spin, analyzed that it sees "Motown's blue-eyed-soul-outfit-that-could Rare Earth and house diva Barbara Tucker cross-fade and elevate the curtain moment with what gooder-than-Yeezus-and-thou Christians call the Good News" while opining rapper Kendrick Lamar should have provided vocals for the song instead of fellow album track "No More Parties in LA". Jayson Greene of Pitchfork described the song as pitting Post Malone "against a sample of" "Mystery of Love" as well as "a flip of" Rare Earth's "(I Know) I'm Losing You", with him admitting that the song "rigs the mix so that Malone, somehow, sounds more important than both of them" while calling the sampling "a reminder of Kanye's audacious touch with huge, immediately recognizable pieces of musical history."

Comparing the song to the version played at Yeezy Season 2, Corbin Reiff from The A.V. Club stated it went from "a plodding, repetitive instrumental number" to "an intricately layered legitimate banger" that features "some superb scumbaggery from Ty Dolla $ign." In HipHopDX, Justin Hunte labeled the song an "ode to dwindling love that moves more like a Ty Dolla $ign and Post Malone collaboration than a Yeezy solo offering," concluding by pointing to it as "an ironic ending to an album" that is mostly about the polarizing topic of West's greatness. For RapReviews, Jesal 'Jay Soul' Padania selected "Fade" as a "fan favorite" on the album and compared the song to a "happy catwalk model" due to it being "taken from front and centre, and shoved right to the back, just to be contrary and fit in something like '30 Hours'." In a mixed review, referencing the position of the tracks on The Life of Pablo, Philip Cosores of Consequence of Sound viewed the song and "No More Parties in LA" as "A-sides on the wrong album shoved onto the end of the collection that would have been stronger if it ended with 'Wolves'," though called the tracks "not flawed lyrically."

=== Accolades ===
"Fade" was listed among year-end lists for 2016 by multiple publications. The track was voted 76th on The Village Voice's Pazz & Jop poll for that year, receiving 7 mentions and being tied for the position with 12 other songs. The Fader listed the track as the 55th best song of 2016. It was named as the 32nd best song of the year by Spin, with Rich Juzwiak noting the song's house influence for retaining "the menacing quality of that early Chicago stuff" due to it sampling Mr. Finger's "Mystery of Love", Tucker's "I Get Lifted", and Harddrive's "Deep Inside". On Les Inrocks's list of 2016's best tracks, the song was placed at number 25. Billboard ranked "Fade" as the 18th best song of the year, and A.U. of the magazine labeled it "one hell of a workout" that combines "samples from Mr. Fingers and The Undisputed Truth into a runway and dance-floor killer that located the religious lift in romantic paranoia." The track's highest ranking came from screenagers.pl, with it being picked by the webzine as the 12th best song of 2016. "Fade" was later named as one of the 30 best G-House songs of all time in 2017 by Gary Richards, known under his stage name of Destructo.

== Music video ==
=== Background ===
Snapshot of Teyana Taylor dancing in the music video

The music video for "Fade" was directed by the University of Southern California (USC) graduate Eli Linnetz, who first met West when he was working on his 2011 collaborative studio album Watch the Throne with fellow rapper Jay-Z. Linnetz explained that he ended up meeting West after the rapper had tweeted about his creative company Donda and subsequently received an email from a friend of Linnetz's, with West replying to the friend. He recalled that he and West "started working on a bunch of writing projects together" before Linnetz went back to the USC to study screenwriting. Linnetz elaborated on his time at the USC, saying his scholarship involved "working in the costume department, sewing clothing" and that he "was gathering these skills that ended up being perfect for a Kanye West environment." Three weeks before the shooting of the video, West's GOOD Music labelmate Teyana Taylor was made aware that she was set to have a cameo. Linnetz said West emailed him "superlate at night" and requested him to direct the music video, noting he wanted Taylor to dance and her husband Iman Shumpert to also make an appearance. He admitted West used Taylor and Shumpert for displaying real love in the video, which West had previously done by appearing alongside his wife Kim Kardashian in the music video for his single "Bound 2" (2013). Linnetz revealed that West was there for the entirety of the shooting, being "super involved with every detail." According to Linnetz, the visual drew inspiration from a variety of media, including 1970s and 1980s pornography, the film Flashdance (1983), John Carpenter films, 1986 film The Fly, and the Olympics. As a result of her being the lead star, Taylor was exposed to people who weren't aware of who she was before.

During West's appearance at the 2016 MTV Video Music Awards on August 28, the rapper had free rein to do whatever he wanted. West premiered the music video at the ceremony, after saying earlier that he "came here to present my new video." Of the premiere, Taylor admitted she was nervous and recalled being like, "Oh my god, it's tonight! Do I look good? Do I look great? Is he going to change his mind and not premiere it?" The same day as its premiere, the video was made available exclusively on Tidal for one week. It was later uploaded to West's YouTube channel on September 6, 2016.

=== Synopsis ===
For the first three minutes of the music video, Taylor dances in a manner reminiscent of Flashdance in a workout room as "Fade" plays. She is half-clothed while dancing, with her wearing a thong and sports bra. After Taylor's dancing, the video cuts to footage of her making out with Shumpert in a shower. When in the shower, the couple appear naked. For the ending shower scene, Taylor lies on Iman's back as the couple are accompanied by their baby daughter Junie Shumpert, who cries as they are surrounded by several pink sheep. In reference to 1970s and 1980s pornography, the couple are covered in oil on their skin. Taylor's face transforms into the head of a cat, with a lioness face and tail alongside brows that were drawn on by her. The lioness face and tail are used for a biblical shot, which Linnetz said "is foreshadowing bigger things to come." During the shower scene, the sheep are "pooping and peeing everywhere."

=== Reception ===
The music video was positively received by critics. At Vogue, Patricia Garcia commented that the "workout-inspired dance moves" from Taylor in the video "stole the show" at the 2016 MTV Video Music Awards. Emilia Petrarca of W wrote that "Taylor makes viewers' jaws drop as she flexes Flashdance style" in the video, praising her "absolutely killer, super athletic body," and Petrarca called the visual "Kanye's new new workout plan." For The New York Times, Joe Coscarelli dubbed it a "flesh-heavy dance video." Justin Carissimo of The Independent noted Taylor's "fiery performance," describing her as having "essentially danced her ass off for three minutes a la Flashdance."

At the 2017 MTV Video Music Awards, the music video won the Best Choreography award. The video was awarded Best Dance Performance at the 2016 Soul Train Music Awards, where it also received a nomination for the award of Video of the Year. At the 2017 UK Music Video Awards, the visual won Best Choreography in a Video, alongside being nominated for the Best Dance International award at the ceremony. By October 12, 2016, the music video had received around 34 million YouTube views.

=== Credits and personnel ===
Credits adapted from The Independent.

==== Production ====
- VFX by Gloria FX

==== Personnel ====
- Kanye West – creative vision
- Eli Linnetz – director
- Iconoclast – production
- Kathleen Heffernan – executive production
- Guillermo Navarro – director of photography
- Tino Shaedler – production design
- Renelou Pandora – styling
- Guapo – choreographer
- Jae Blaze – choreographer
- Derek "Bentley" Watkins – choreographer
- Adam Robinson – editor
- Sofie Borup – color

== Commercial performance ==
Following the release of The Life of Pablo, the song debuted at number two on the US Billboard Bubbling Under R&B/Hip-Hop Singles chart. After being released as a single, "Fade" entered the US Hot R&B/Hip Hop Songs chart at number 39 for the issue date of September 24, 2016. It received 4.9 millions streams that week, increasing by 130 percent from the previous week, and 50 percent of the streams came from YouTube views of the accompanying music video. The following week, the song roses 27 places to peak at number 12 on the chart. In the same week as its debut on the US Hot R&B/Hip Hop Songs chart, the song opened at number 98 on the US Billboard Hot 100. On the chart issue dated October 1, 2016, the song climbed 51 places to its peak of number 47 on the Hot 100. The song lasted for 13 weeks on the chart. On April 21, 2021, "Fade" was certified double platinum by the Recording Industry Association of America (RIAA) for pushing 2,000,000 certified units in the US.

Elsewhere, the song peaked at number 37 on the Canadian Hot 100. On the Scottish Singles Sales Chart, it reached number 20. After the album's release, the song entered the UK Singles Chart at number 125. It later reached the top 100 of the chart for the issue dated September 16, 2016, charting at number 65. The next week, the song climbed 15 places to peak at number 50 on the UK Singles Chart. The song lasted for eight weeks on the chart and as of October 24, 2019, it ranks as West's 23rd most successful track of all time in the United Kingdom. "Fade" was certified gold by the British Phonographic Industry (BPI) for sales of 200,000 units in the UK on May 21, 2021. In France, the song peaked at number 40 on the SNEP chart.

== Live performances and appearances in media ==
The song was performed twice during West and the Sunday Service Choir's Easter appearance at the Coachella Valley Music and Arts Festival in April 2019, though West only provided vocals for the second performance.

West performed "Fade" live as the closer to his opening concert on the Saint Pablo Tour at Bankers Life Fieldhouse in Indianapolis on August 25, 2016. While the song came to an end during the performance, the lift designed for carrying West over the large 30' x 30' projection screen in front of his stage malfunctioned. As a result of the malfunction, West had to descend with the stage to the ground and leave via the arena's floor. On November 1, 2016, the song was performed by West for his fourth concert at The Forum in Inglewood on the tour, with him being backed by pink strobe lights. For West and his gospel group the Sunday Service Choir's headlining set at the 2019 Coachella Festival on April 21 that coincided with Easter, the group delivered a performance of the song. The version performed featured synths and during the performance, the crowd stood up and danced. West later performed "Fade" as the closer to the set. A gospel rendition of the song was performed by West and the Sunday Service Choir for the group's concert at the Huntington Bank Pavilion in Chicago on September 8, 2019. On October 12 of that year, West and the Sunday Service Choir performed the song as part of a surprise concert on the yard at Howard University. During the group's concert at the Forum on October 27, 2019, they performed a spiritual version of the song with West, though the version retained the original's bassline and hook.

On February 17, 2016, American musician Gant-Man shared his juke remix of the song. A club remix, it adds synths and percussion to the original. American basketball player Shaquille O'Neal shared a video of him performing an impression of Taylor's dancing in the song's music video to Instagram on September 12, 2016. In September 2017, English singer Noel Gallagher revealed that the track "Fort Knox" from his band Noel Gallagher's High Flying Birds' third studio album Who Built the Moon? (2017) was inspired by "Fade". Gallagher recalled running into the studio and expressing heavy admiration for the track after his first listen, considering sending it to West to use as his own. However, Gallagher decided to keep "Fort Knox" for himself after competition due to him realizing how good it was. Ty Dolla Sign wrote that his single "Ego Death" "expands on 'Fade'," which was released on July 1, 2020 and features West, FKA Twigs, and Skrillex.

== Sunday Service Choir version ==
"Follow Me – Faith"

Song by Sunday Service Choir

from the album Jesus Is Born
- Released: December 25, 2019
- Recorded: 2019
- Genre: Gospel
- Length: 5:33
- Label: INC
- Composers: Kanye West; Nikki Grier

=== Background and composition ===
A reinterpretation of "Fade" with American house group Aly-Us' "Follow Me" (1992), titled "Follow Me – Faith", was recorded by the Sunday Service Choir. The song was released on December 25, 2019 as the seventh track on the group's debut studio album Jesus Is Born. Prior to the reinterpretation's release, the Sunday Service Choir had performed "Follow Me" as part of their set at the 2019 Coachella Festival. In January 2019, former West Angeles Church of God in Christ music director Jason White received a call from Ray Romulus of the Stereotypes informing him West wanted a choir, with Romulus requesting 100 people for it and to put together a band. White continued, revealing that he went to meet Romulus after the call and despite the two having a lack of knowledge or songs at the time, they "called about 100 people, said it's an A-list artist, can't tell you who it is or what it is, meet us here." Although he was "a little scared" of becoming involved with any of West's controversies, White opined that he "could see something different about this guy" on the night he first met West during rehearsal. White hired American songwriter Nikki Grier to sing, with her and West re-writing lyrics of songs after White "pulled her from the top of the choir stand." The song was composed by West and Grier.

"Follow Me – Faith" is a two-part gospel track, which transitions from a riff off "Follow Me" into a reinterpretation of "Fade". "Follow Me" features a dance groove, while the lyrics see the Sunday Service Choir leading listeners to Christianity. Following the first part, "Faith" maintains the structure of "Fade" and also takes the bassline. Beneath the bassline, it adds organs, horns, and handclaps. The horns accompany dark piano keys during the second part's bridge. Lyrically, "Faith" focuses on the love of God. On the hook, the group repeatedly sings, "Your love is favor. We feel it, faith," with the word "faith" being stretched out vocally; the lyrics were originally written as "Your love is fadin'/ I feel it fadin" for "Fade". The original's line "Deep down inside" is switched to "He's alive, He-He-He's alive" on the bridge by the Sunday Service Choir.

=== Reception and promotion ===
"Follow Me – Faith" was met with positive reviews from music critics, with a number of them praising the composition. Earmilk author Max Pasion-Gonzales said it may be "the most compelling moment" on Jesus Is Born, commenting that "Follow Me" includes an "inviting dance groove" alongside describing "Faith" as "a strong religious iteration" of "Fade". Pasion-Gonzales lauded the impressiveness of the track's second part due to "how seamlessly the lyrical and musical transition to gospel was made from the original" and praised the "beautiful" hook, while he called the track "dynamic and powerful" and observed that it "encourages dancing, rejoicing, and celebration." For NME, Rhian Daly wrote that the reinterpretation "inventively switches lines" from "Fade" and commended the organs, horns, and handclaps for "adding another glorious layer of joy to things." Revolt's Preezy Brown opined that by transitioning from "Follow Me" into "a gospel-infused interpolation" of "Fade", the rendition "brings the club to the church, and embodies the best of both worlds in the process." In Exclaim!, Ryan B. Patrick picked the reinterpretation as one of the album's main tracks "to vibe off of." At Spectrum Culture, Daniel Bromfield analyzed that the first part turns the original "into something alive with convivial chatter, more like a Moodymann cut than anything else." Biana Gracie from Billboard noted the reinterpretation for uplifting "Follow Me" "with an inspiring message." "Follow Me – Faith" experienced a lesser reception commercially. For the issue dated January 11, 2020, it peaked at number 22 on the US Billboard Gospel Songs chart.

For promotion, the rendition was performed by the Sunday Service Choir as part of their concert at Credit Union 1 Arena in Chicago on February 16, 2020. During the performance, White directed the group while standing in the middle of the arena's two-tiered stage.

== Track listing ==
Digital download / streaming

1. "Fade" – 3:13

== Credits and personnel ==
Credits adapted from West's official website and Tidal.

=== Recording locations ===
- Mixed at No Name Studios, North Hollywood, CA

=== Personnel ===
- Kanye West – songwriter, production
- Benji B – songwriter, co-production
- Ryan "Charlie Handsome" Vojtesak – songwriter, co-production
- Anthony Kilhoffer – songwriter, co-production, engineer
- Mike Dean – songwriter, co-production, engineer
- Noah Goldstein – songwriter, additional production, engineer, mixer
- Ty Dolla Sign – songwriter, vocals
- Post Malone – songwriter, vocals
- Jerome Potter – songwriter
- Samuel Griesemer – songwriter
- Norman Whitfield – songwriter
- Eddie Holland – songwriter
- Cornelius Grant – songwriter
- Larry Heard – songwriter
- Robert Owens – songwriter
- Louie Vega – songwriter
- Ronald Carroll – songwriter
- Barbara Tucker – songwriter
- Harold Matthews – songwriter
- Stephan Garrett – songwriter
- Rapture Stewart – songwriter
- Eric Seats – songwriter
- Malik Yusef – songwriter
- DJDS – additional production
- Andrew Dawson – additional production
- David Rowland – additional production
- William J. Sullivan – assistant mixer

== Charts ==
=== Weekly charts ===
Chart performance for "Fade"
Chart (2016)	Peak position
Australia (ARIA)	69
Belgium (Ultratip Bubbling Under Flanders)	31
Belgium Urban (Ultratop Flanders)	21
Canada Hot 100 (Billboard)	37
France (SNEP)	40
Ireland (IRMA)	75
Scottish Singles Sales (Official Charts)	20
UK Singles (Official Charts)	50
UK Hip Hop/R&B (Official Charts)	7
US Billboard Hot 100	47
US Dance Airplay (Billboard)	19
US Dance Club Songs (Billboard)	43
US Hot R&B/Hip-Hop Songs (Billboard)	12
US Pop Airplay (Billboard)	23
US Rhythmic Airplay (Billboard)	9

Chart performance for "Follow Me – Faith"
Chart (2020)	Peak position
US Gospel Songs (Billboard)	22

=== Year-end charts ===
2016 year-end chart performance for "Fade"
Chart (2016)	Position
US Hot R&B/Hip-Hop Songs (Billboard)	95

== Certifications ==
Certifications for "Fade"
Region	Certification	Certified units/sales
New Zealand (RMNZ)	Gold	15,000^{‡}
United Kingdom (BPI)	Gold	400,000^{‡}
United States (RIAA)	2× Platinum	2,000,000^{‡}
^{‡} Sales+streaming figures based on certification alone.

== Release history ==
Release dates and formats for "Fade"
Region	Date	Format(s)	Label(s)	Ref.
Various	September 9, 2016	Digital download; streaming	GOOD; Def Jam	
United Kingdom	September 9, 2016	Mainstream radio	GOOD; Def Jam	
United States	September 20, 2016	Contemporary hit radio	GOOD; Def Jam	
United States	September 20, 2016	Rhythmic contemporary radio	GOOD; Def Jam	
United States	September 20, 2016	Urban contemporary radio	GOOD; Def Jam	
