= Club Future Nostalgia =

- Cover for physical editions, digital editions don't feature any text

Remix album by Dua Lipa and the Blessed Madonna (Note: The Blessed Madonna is only credited as a lead artist on the DJ Mix edition of the album.)
- Released: 28 August 2020
- Recorded: 2020
- Studios: Westlake (Los Angeles); Gold Mind (Note: The location of the Gold Mind Studios where Missy Elliott's vocals for "Levitating" (The Blessed Madonna remix) were recorded is not indicated in the liner notes of Club Future Nostalgia.)
- Genres: House; pop; soul
- Length: 50:07
- Label: Warner
- Producer: The Blessed Madonna

Dua Lipa chronology
Future Nostalgia (2020)	Club Future Nostalgia (2020)	Radical Optimism (2024)

The Blessed Madonna chronology
DGTL: The Blessed Madonna at DGTL Madrid, 2018 (2018)	Club Future Nostalgia (2020)	NYE 2021 (2020)

Singles from Club Future Nostalgia
- 1. "Levitating (The Blessed Madonna remix)" Released: 13 August 2020

Club Future Nostalgia is a remix album by English singer Dua Lipa and American DJ the Blessed Madonna. A DJ mix edition of it was released on 28 August 2020, with the standard edition following on 11 September of the same year. The album was crafted by remixes of tracks from Lipa's second studio album, Future Nostalgia (2020), with the remixes being created by an assortment of DJs and producers, including Masters at Work, Larry Heard, Mark Ronson and Stuart Price.

Club Future Nostalgia is primarily a house, pop, and soul record, with Baltimore club, dance, disco, drum and bass and piano house influences. Guest appearances are included from Missy Elliott, Jamiroquai, Madonna and Gwen Stefani and Blackpink. The album received generally favourable reviews from music critics, with many praising its danceability and merging of sub-genres; however many preferred its parent album. It appeared on year-end lists published by Billboard, Variety and the Los Angeles Times. Commercially, the album reached number 28 on the US Billboard 200 and number 13 on the Canadian Albums Chart, and became both Lipa and the Blessed Madonna's first entry on the US Top Dance/Electronic Albums chart, reaching the summit on the chart.

Club Future Nostalgia marks the first appearance of previously unreleased tracks "Love Is Religion" and "That Kind of Woman". The original version of the latter later appeared on Future Nostalgia: The Moonlight Edition (2021). It also includes a remix of Lipa and Blackpink's "Kiss and Make Up", with the original version of the song being released on Dua Lipa: Complete Edition (2018). The Blessed Madonna's remix of "Levitating", featuring Madonna and Elliott, was released as the lead single from Club Future Nostalgia on 13 August 2020. Alongside the single, a visualizer for the album was released for promotion, directed by James Papper and Will Hooper.

== Background ==
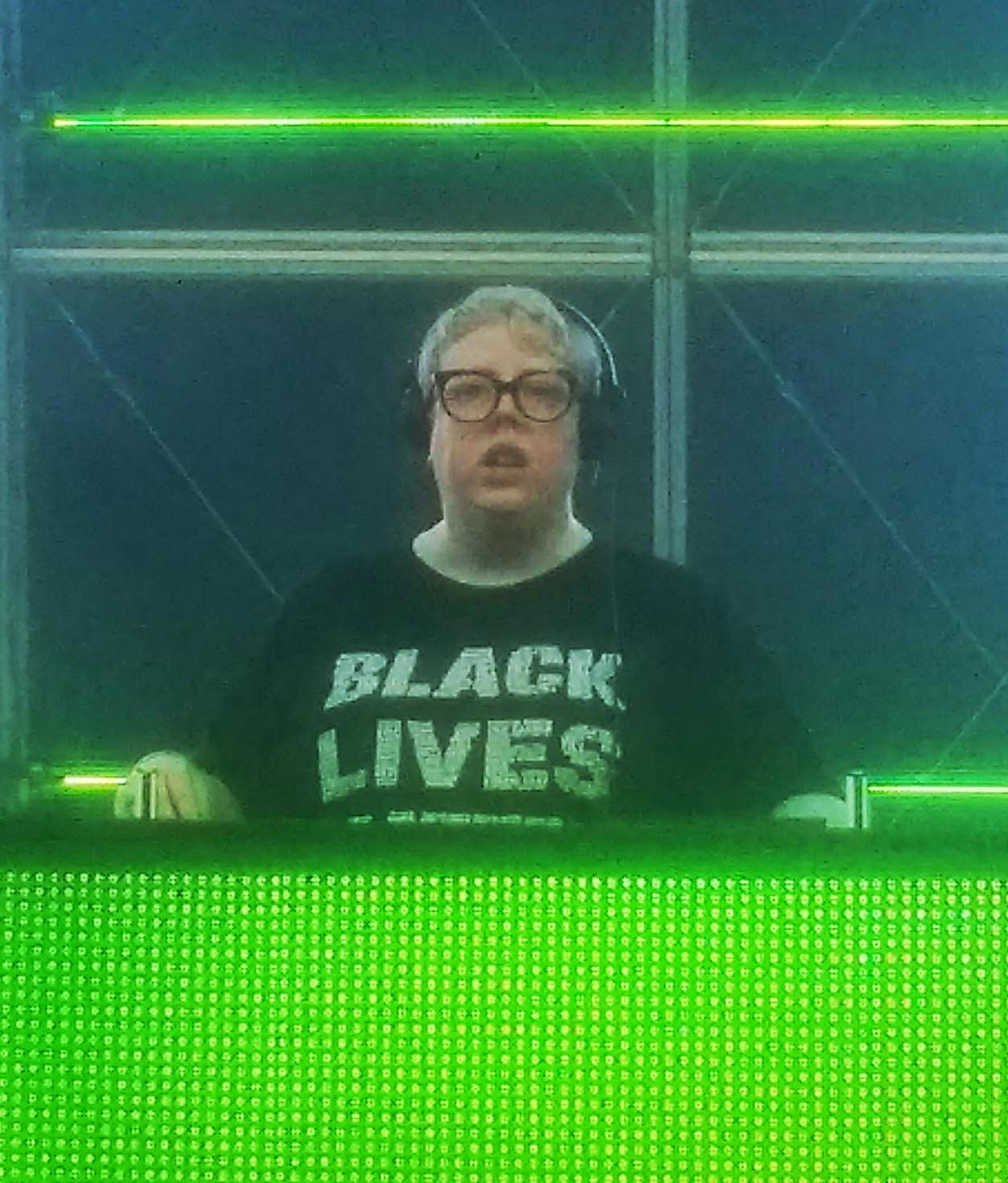
The Blessed Madonna (pictured) serves as the album's executive producer.

Following the March 2020 release of her second studio album Future Nostalgia, Dua Lipa was unable to tour for the album due to the restrictions imposed in response to the COVID-19 pandemic. However, she was brought much joy after seeing her fans listening to Future Nostalgia in their homes and on Zoom parties as if they were with her. Intending to "take the party up a notch", Lipa enlisted the help of the Blessed Madonna to put together an "old-school" mixtape with remixes of songs from the album, alongside samples. The two of them met at the Glastonbury Festival in 2019, and the Blessed Madonna remixed Lipa and Silk City's "Electricity" in October 2018 before they ran into one and other at NYC Downlow. The Blessed Madonna got involved in the project around May 2020, following a Zoom call between both her and Lipa's respective teams. She handled executive production and A&R duties for Club Future Nostalgia.

Club Future Nostalgia was created in two months, during lockdown protocols due to the COVID-19 pandemic. From the beginning of creation, Lipa and the Blessed Madonna were on the same page for what their vision of the album was. The Blessed Madonna started by creating a list of samples and remixers that she wanted for the album, many of whom had already been approached by Lipa's team, including Paul Woolford, Jayda G, Gen Hoshino, Larry Heard, and Yaeji. The Blessed Madonna worked on Club Future Nostalgia from her home studio in London, with a workflow that consisted of breaking down the remixes into sections, creating new versions of them, and going back and forth with engineers while waiting on features.

== Production ==
When remixing "Good in Bed", Hoshino spent countless days in front of his computer, attempting to not waste any time. He intended to mix Lipa's contemporary nature with early 1980s soul essence and electronic imagery of the same time period. The Blessed Madonna then took over, merging the remix with Zach Witness' remix of the same song, though mostly Hoshino's remix is heard. She also increased the pitch of the synth part from "Moments in Love" (1983) by Art of Noise to be in key with "Good in Bed". Finally, the Blessed Madonna had Mark Ronson call in and request Neneh Cherry's "Buffalo Stance" (1988), which was used to create a radio interlude. She chose the "gigolo" lyric from the song to go with the theme of "Good in Bed". Witness' original "Boys Will Be Boys" remix did not include the song's verses, so the Blessed Madonna remixed it, adding in the verses, as well as a break of Lyn Collins' "Think (About It)" (1972).

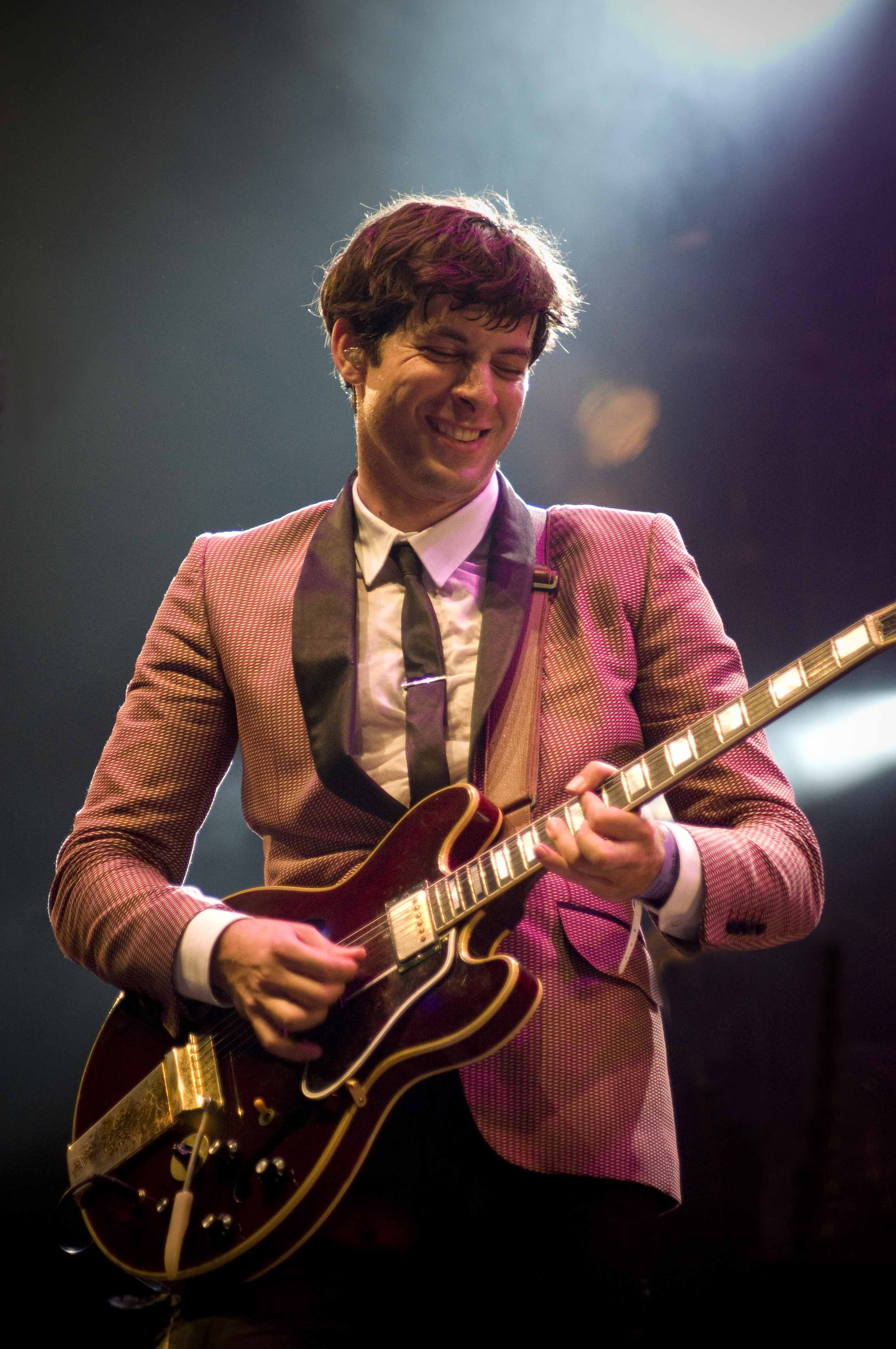
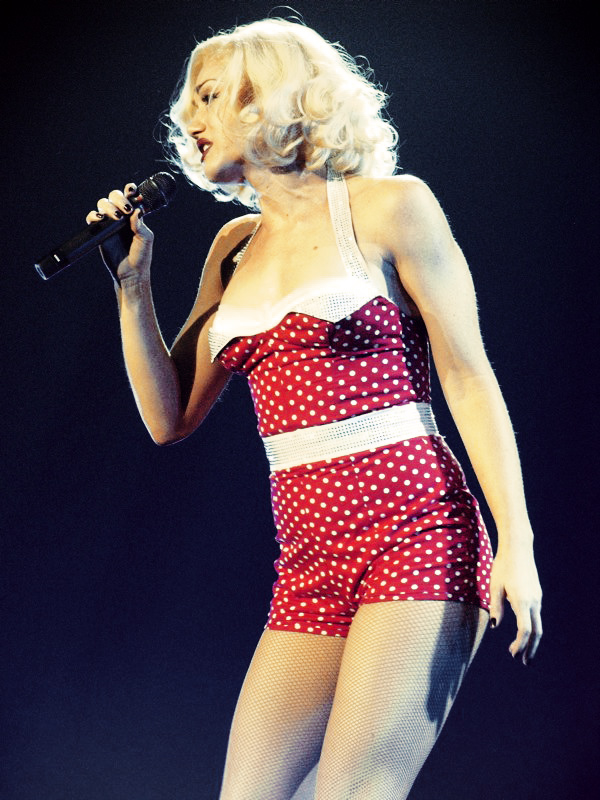
Gwen Stefani (pictured right) was a last-minute addition to Mark Ronson's (pictured left) "Physical" remix after she was approached for a sample of her song "Hollaback Girl" from Club Future Nostalgia.

After Lipa mentioned that Jamiroquai was one of her reference points for Club Future Nostalgia, the Blessed Madonna wanted to do something with them. She ultimately found Dimitri from Paris' edit of the band's "Cosmic Girl" (1996), which only existed on vinyl during the production of the album, and mashed it up with "Break My Heart" to create a remix. For her own "Levitating" remix, the Blessed Madonna originally created the remix as if Lipa was the only person on it. After Madonna and Missy Elliott joined the song, the two of them sent their respective versions to the Blessed Madonna, who ended up "Frankenstein-ing" the three versions together. Madonna's engineer Mike Dean mixed down the song, while also handling its mastering. Heard, credited as Mr. Fingers, started his "Hallucinate" remix by attempting to place some club-style concepts alongside Lipa's vocals. The Blessed Madonna's "Love Is Religion" remix had multiple versions, which led to both her and Lipa's teams having a lot of back and forth.

Yaeji wanted to pull out different moods and emotions for her "Don't Start Now" remix, which she found difficult to reimagine due to the fact that the song is her favourite of Lipa's. She also used her own voice for the remix. Ronson took apart "Physical" for his remix, intending for a Ruff Ryders direction, and an electronic‑R&B mood. When the album was finished, Gwen Stefani expressed her desire to be on the remix, after having been previously approached for a "Hollaback Girl" sample on Mr Fingers' "Hallucinate" remix. It ended up that she wanted to be on "Physical", which both Ronson and the Blessed Madonna quickly included her on. The "Kiss and Make Up" remix was created after Lipa expressed a desire to include some of her past features and collaborations, which caused the Blessed Madonna to combine vocals from the song with parts of "Rise" (1979) by Herb Alpert. Moodymann created two versions of his "Break My Heart" remix, which both were ultimately included on Club Future Nostalgia. After all the remixes were finished, the Blessed Madonna edited each track by chopping and deconstructing them to create a DJ Mix, while also adding sound effects, ad-libs, and the samples.

== Composition ==
Club Future Nostalgia is a 1990s house, 2020 pop, and 1980s soul album, that was noted for blending several different subgenres, including Baltimore club, dance, disco, drum and bass, and piano house. The DJ Mix edition of the album is crafted so each track seamlessly transitions into the next, with DJ drop-ins from the remixers and Lipa, and samples from many of Lipa's influences. The DJ Mix edition opens with Joe Goddard's "jubilant" "Future Nostalgia" remix. Reminiscent of a 3am Glastonbury Festival DJ set, the remix incorporates Hot Chip-style synths and Daft Punk-inspired whirrs. The following track, Jayda G's "Cool" remix, amps-up the original, reimagining it as a 1990s filter-disco track. Witness and Hoshino's remix of "Good in Bed" appears as the next track; it is split into two separate tracks on the album's standard edition. The remix "nimbly" hopscotches between its various parts, and features a funky flow. Back-to-back "Pretty Please" remixes follow, courtesy of Midland and Masters at Work, respectively. Both remixes blend elements of 1990s music, UK garage, New York house, and contemporary dance-pop, while solely Masters at Work's remix is a take on bleep-house, and the Midland refix has a soulful sound. "Boys Will Be Boys", remixed by Witness, has a club and Baltimore sound, with a Rio Carnival feel and it features a Latin-inflected groove that helps amp-up the track. The remix was described as "symphonic", and its production uses frantic drums, whistles, horns, cowbells, and a distorted chanted chorus.

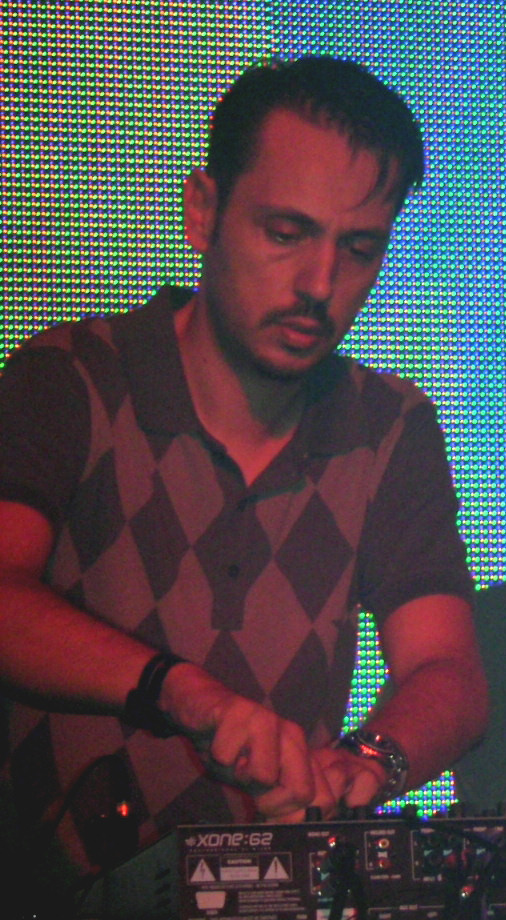
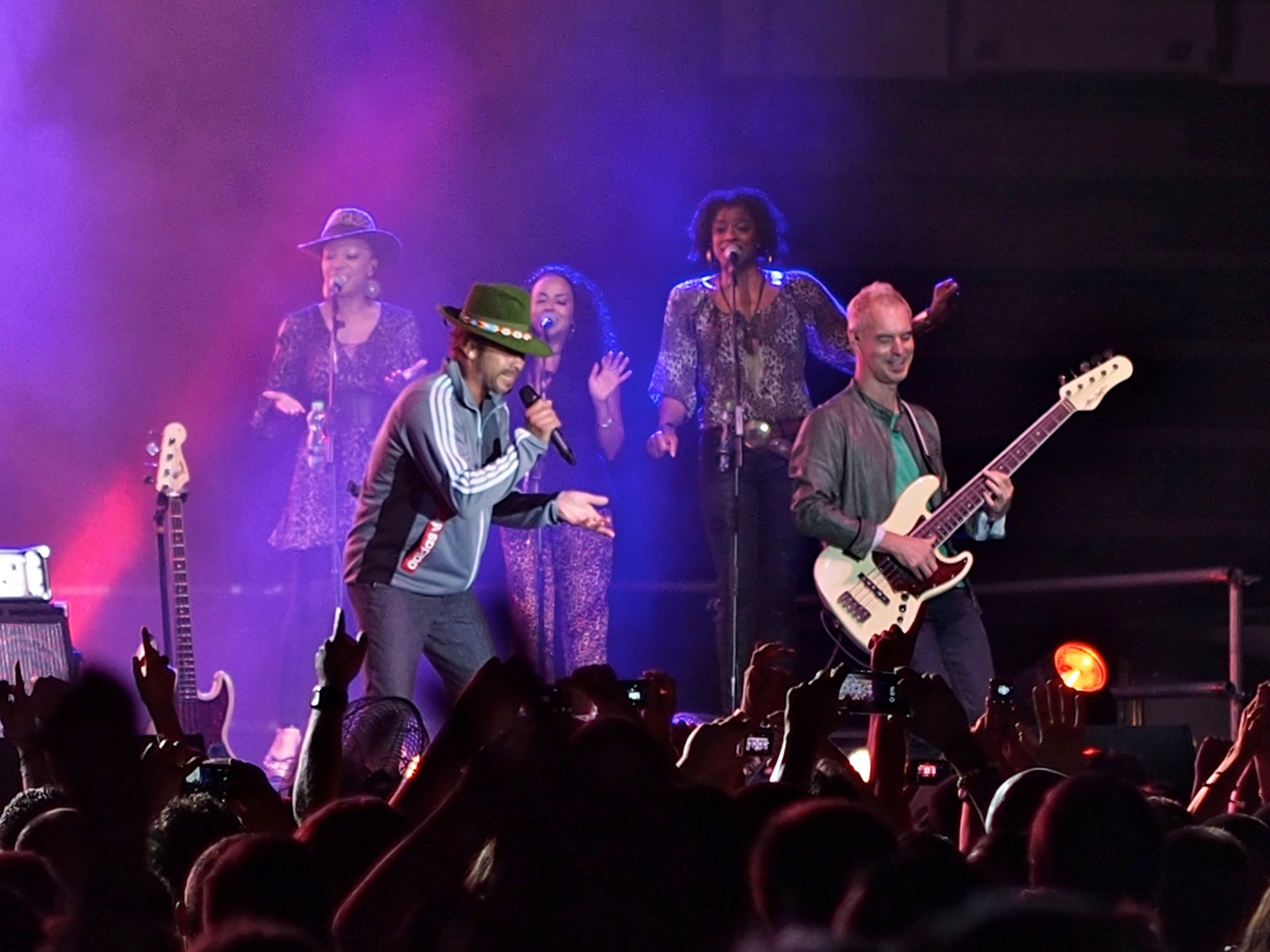
A mashup of "Break My Heart" and Dimitri from Paris' (pictured left) edit of Jamiroquai's (pictured right) "Cosmic Girl" appears on the album.

The synth-heavy remix of "Love Again" by Horse Meat Disco features a "squelchy" 1980s and retro charm. Horse Meat Disco introduce simple new melodies for the remix while it also includes strutting beats and funk-laced instrumentals. The first part of the song is very clubby, while the second part drops to a cruise. A mashup of "Break My Heart" and a Dimitri from Paris edit of Jamiroquai's "Cosmic Girl", which is a DJ Mix only track, is an upbeat remix with unbridled energy, which makes the former funkier. The Blessed Madonna's "Levitating" remix, featuring Madonna and Elliott, spans electro-disco, electro house, future bass, and techno genres. It has a dance-orientated production that consists of futuristic synths, a pounding bass, and vocodered backing vocals, reminiscent of Daft Punk. A remix of "Hallucinate" by Mr Fingers entitled "deep stripped mix" and Woolford's extended mix follow, both of which incorporate elements of 1990s house and contemporary dance-pop. With his remix, Mr Fingers created a skeletal ambient track, where he reduces Lipa vocals down to a whisper, and incorporates a "gurgling" bassline, slinky synths, and West End disco beats. "Love Is Religion" (The Blessed Madonna remix) is a 1980s gospel and pop-house remix, with a choir-backed chorus and bubblegum synths.

"Love Is Religion" (The Blessed Madonna remix)
The Blessed Madonna's "Love Is Religion" remix is a 1980s-styled pop-house and gospel song with choir-backed chorus and bubblegum synths.

The "Don't Start Now" remix by Yaeji is driven by an ASMR-esque drum beat, and makes use of a G-funk deep bass and a stop-start rhythm. The remix spans Baltimore club, house, minimal disco, pop, and trap genres. Ronson's midtempo "Physical" remix that features Stefani reimagines the song as an electro track, with Lipa and Stefani's vocals blending together. The remix of "Kiss and Make Up", a DJ Mix only track, has a club feel and influences from the urban roots of remix culture. It was described as a pop-funk remix. Like its predecessor, Jacques Lu Cont's remix of "That Kind of Woman" also has a club feel, and incorporates Kylie Minogue-style disco and Balearic genres. The DJ mix edition of Club Future Nostalgia closes with a remix of "Break My Heart" by Moodymann, who looped Lipa's vocal phrases and adjusted his sound to fit hers. A Detroit house and modern dance track, the remix includes a bass lick, cowbells, and ambiance, as well as clinking bottles and laughing sound effects. The standard edition of the album also includes a "Don't Start Now" remix by Kaytranada. The remix is a bass-heavy, deep house and funky house track with a pop production.

== Release and promotion ==
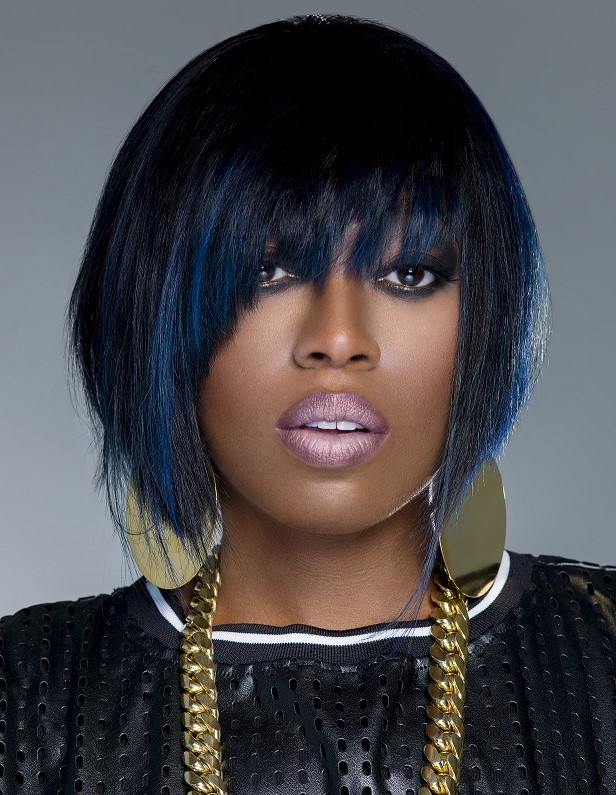
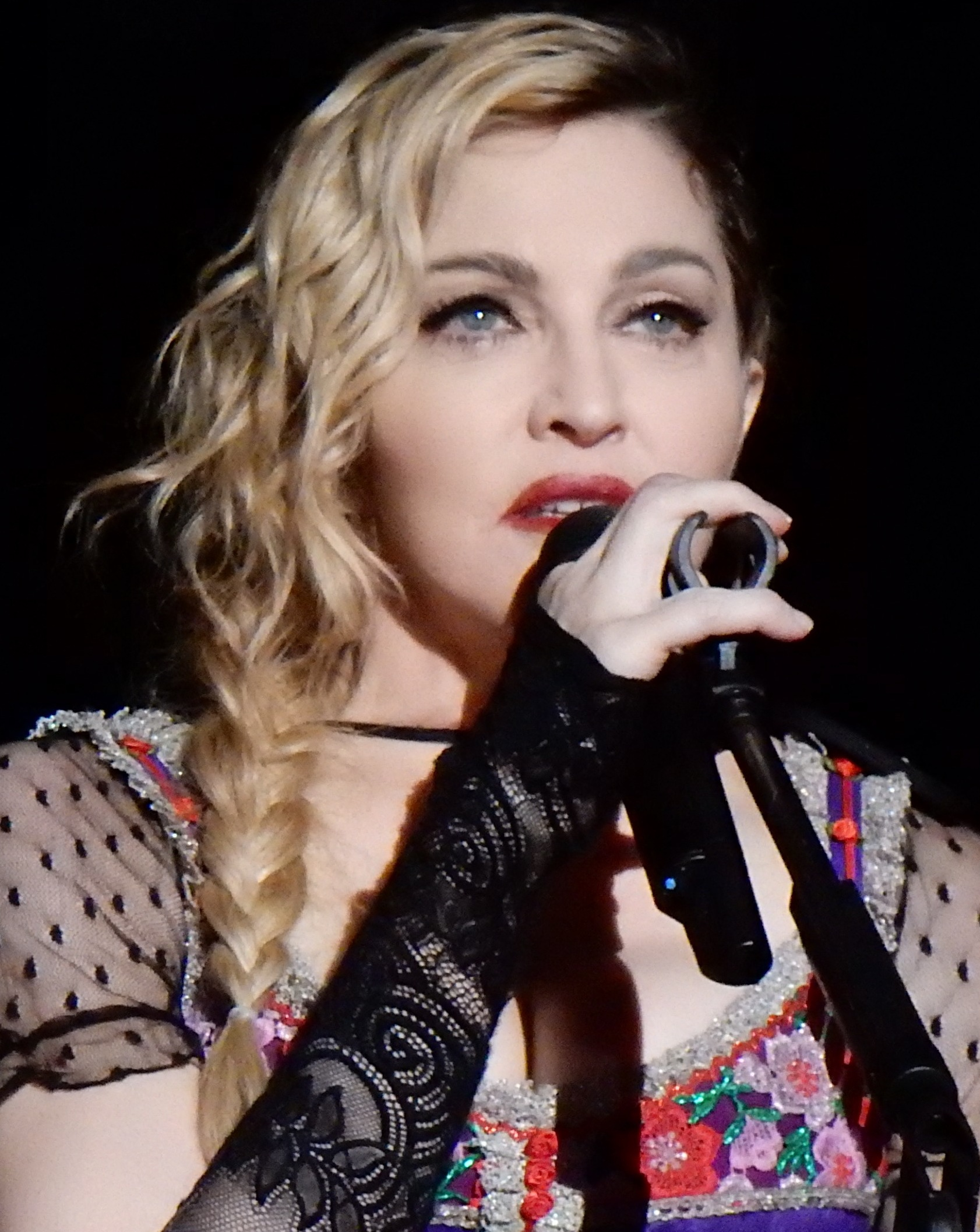
Missy Elliott (left) and Madonna (right) are featured on Club Future Nostalgia's lead single, the Blessed Madonna's remix of "Levitating".

Following the announcement of the "Levitating" remix, Lipa revealed on 4 August 2020 that the remix, along with a remix of "Physical" by Ronson featuring Stefani, would be featured on a remix album for Future Nostalgia, titled Club Future Nostalgia. The Blessed Madonna's remix of "Levitating" that features Madonna and Elliott was released as Club Future Nostalgia's lead single on 13 August 2020. The album was scheduled to be released on 21 August 2020; however, 11 days earlier, Lipa revealed while hosting Jimmy Kimmel Live! that Club Future Nostalgia was being delayed by a week in order to create an animation for every track on it. A week before its release, Lipa revealed the track list.

A DJ Mix-crafted edition of Club Future Nostalgia was released for digital download and streaming by Warner Records on 28 August 2020, with the un-mixed standard edition, released through the same record label and for the same formats, following on 11 September 2020. Club Future Nostalgia marks the first appearance of previously unreleased tracks "Love Is Religion" and "That Kind of Woman". The standard edition of the album was released on vinyl, while the DJ mix was released on CD on 27 November 2020.

== Visualizer ==
A visualizer for the DJ Mix edition of Club Future Nostalgia was made available for digital download and streaming 28 August 2020. Lipa got the idea for it when preparing her "Hallucinate" video, thinking it was the perfect time to try and get animators to bring their own world with each song. She further thought that during the COVID-19 pandemic would be the only time she would be able to do this. The visual was created as a collaboration between production companies Blink Ink and Blink, with production from Gareth Owen and Corin Taylor.

Production on the visualizer began in late spring 2020. James Papper of Blink Ink handled the direction for the animated parts of the video, working with 13 different artists. Each artist had to work under COVID-19 pandemic lockdown restrictions from their home cities, which included Madrid, Seoul, Sydney, Berlin, Los Angeles, Vancouver, New York City, Kentucky, Ghent, and London. The visualizer for each track was designed by a different artist, which mirrors the album's structure where each track is remixed by a different producer. Live action visuals are included, which were directed by Hooper. They include the music video for the remix of "Levitating", as well as clips of Lipa with her boyfriend Anwar Hadid.

== Critical reception ==
Professional ratings
Aggregate scores
Source	Rating
AnyDecentMusic?	7.0/10
Metacritic	81/100
Review scores
Source	Rating
AllMusic	3/5 stars
The Digital Fix	8/10
The Independent	5/5 stars
NME	4/5 stars
Pitchfork	6.9/10
Slant Magazine	3.5/5 stars
Tom Hull – on the Web	B+

Club Future Nostalgia was met with positive reviews from music critics. At Metacritic, which assigns a normalised rating out of 100 to reviews from mainstream critics, the album has an average score of 81, based on 7 reviews, while AnyDecentMusic?'s assessment of critical consensus gave it 7.0 out of 10.

Writing for the Los Angeles Times, Mikael Wood compared Club Future Nostalgia to Madonna's The Immaculate Collection (1990), while also complimenting Lipa's "vivid" vocals, writing she is a "magnificent" singer. In his review for Variety, Jem Aswad praised the album for getting the concept of merging remix albums and mixtapes "exactly right". He concluded by naming it "more free and fun" than Future Nostalgia. Roisin O'Connor at The Independent stated that the album makes one dance, as well as acclaiming the remixers for removing inhibitions from the liberated songs. Hannah Mylrea of NME viewed it as more of a mixtape than a remix album, and praised the album for merging many different genres together. AllMusic's Neil Z. Yeung commended Club Future Nostalgia for being a "sweaty, thumping update", "nonstop party", and "absolute blast", but also thought that some tracks did not hit the proper heights of what everyone wanted.

For Slant Magazine, Sal Cinquemani criticized the album for lacking the "joyous, adrenaline-fueled arc" of the best DJ sets, but admired its unintentional virtual dance floor gateway. In a mixed review at Pitchfork, Owen Myers stated it "struggles to build the anticipation to earn a payoff." He elaborated, criticizing the remixers for heavy editing that makes the album feel "oddly uneven" and fun, but less than the value of its parts. Justin Curto of Vulture expressed that he is "devastated to report that it takes over 25 minutes for something exciting to happen" on the album. Tom Hull, who had praised the original album, found Club Future Nostalgia inessential but "glittering with ear candy" and was especially impressed by the Neneh Cherry rap sample on "Good in Bed".

=== Year-end lists ===
Club Future Nostalgia placed on best of 2020 year-end lists by numerous publications. Slate hailed the album, along with Future Nostalgia, as 2020's best album in their fourth entry of The Music Club 2020. It placed on an unranked list by Los Angeles Times, while Idolator ranked it at number 47 on their year-end list. Variety writer Jem Aswad thought it was the fifth best album of 2020. Billboard ranked it as the third best dance album of 2020, with editor Katie Bain saying the "club-ready rework of one of the year's best albums was both a slick marketing maneuver and a joyful bridge between the Top 40 and the dancefloor".

== Commercial performance ==
In the United States, Club Future Nostalgia debuted at number 28 on the Billboard 200 chart issue dated 12 September 2020, with first-week sales of 18,000 album-equivalent units. In the same week, the album became both Lipa and the Blessed Madonna's first entry on Billboard's Dance/Electronic Albums chart, where it debuted at the top position, breaking the 13-week streak of Lady Gaga's Chromatica (2020). Elsewhere, Club Future Nostalgia reached number 13 on the Canadian Albums Chart. The album spent only one week on all the respective charts it entered.

== Track listings ==
DJ Mix edition
No.	Title	Writer(s)	Producer(s)	Length
1.	"Future Nostalgia" (Joe Goddard remix)	Lipa; Bhasker; Coffee	Bhasker; Mones^{[a]}	2:54
2.	"Cool" (Jayda G remix)	Lipa; Purcell; Philip; Kohn; Barnes; Kelleher; Tove Lo	TMS; Price; Blackwood^{[c]}	2:06
3.	"Good in Bed" (Zach Witness & Gen Hoshino remixes)	Lipa; Shulz; Fontana; Upsahl; Biral; Akil-Baptiste	Lindgren; Take a Daytrip	3:58
4.	"Pretty Please" (Midland refix)	Lipa; Michaels; Ailin; Kirkpatrick	Kirkpatrick; Ariza^{[a]}	1:28
5.	"Pretty Please" (Masters at Work remix)	Lipa; Michaels; Ailin; Kirkpatrick	Kirkpatrick; Ariza^{[a]}	1:54
6.	"Boys Will Be Boys" (Zach Witness remix)	Lipa; Kennedi; Tranter; Evigan	Koz; Blackwood^{[c]}	3:29
7.	"Love Again" (Horse Meat Disco remix)	Lipa; Coffee; Kozmeniuk; Grimes	Koz; Price^{[a]}; Blackwood^{[c]}	2:55
8.	"Break My Heart / Cosmic Girl (Dimitri from Paris edit)" (with Jamiroquai)	Lipa; Wotman; Tamposi; S. Johnson; K. Johnson; Farriss; Hutchence	Watt; The Monsters & Strangerz	3:00
9.	"Levitating" (The Blessed Madonna remix featuring Madonna and Missy Elliott)	Lipa; Coffee; Hudson; Kozmeniuk; Madonna; Elliott	Koz; Price; D'elia^{[c]}; The Blessed Madonna^{[a]}	3:55
10.	"Hallucinate" (Mr Fingers deep stripped mix)	Lipa; Lewis; Cooke	SG Lewis; Price; D'elia^{[c]}	1:53
11.	"Hallucinate" (Paul Woolford extended remix)	Lipa; Lewis; Cooke	SG Lewis; Price; D'elia^{[c]}	1:49
12.	"Love Is Religion" (The Blessed Madonna remix)	Lipa; Coffee; Hudson; Uzoechi Emenike; Dan Traynor; Kozmeniuk	Koz; Grades; Nathan Body^{[a]}; MNEK^{[c]}; The Blessed Madonna^{[c]}	3:29
13.	"Don't Start Now" (Yaeji remix)	Lipa; Ailin; Warren; Kirkpatrick	Kirkpatrick; Ailin^{[b]}	2:53
14.	"Physical" (Mark Ronson remix featuring Gwen Stefani)	Lipa; Evigan; Coffee; Hudson	Evigan; Koz; Stone^{[c]}; D'elia^{[c]}	2:39
15.	"Kiss and Make Up" (remix with Blackpink)	Lipa; Grimes; Yannick Rastogi; Zacharie Raymond; Mathieu Jomphe-Lepine; Marc Vincent; Teddy Park	Banx & Ranx	2:21
16.	"That Kind of Woman" (Jacques Lu Cont remix)	Lipa; Justin Parker; Sam Dew; Coffee	Parker; Blackwood^{[c]}	3:13
17.	"Break My Heart" (Moodymann remix)	Lipa; Wotman; Tamposi; S. Johnson; K. Johnson; Farriss; Hutchence	Watt; The Monsters & Strangerz	6:11
Total length:				50:07

=== Notes ===
- The Club Future Nostalgia released two weeks after the DJ Mix edition includes full versions of remixes. It also excludes "Break My Heart / Cosmic Girl (Dimitri from Paris edit)" and "Kiss and Make Up" (remix), and includes "Don't Start Now" (Kaytranada remix).
- "Good in Bed" (Zach Witness and Gen Hoshino remixes) incorporates elements of "Buffalo Stance", written by Jamie Morgan, Phillip Ramacon, Neneh Cherry and Cameron McVey and samples "Art of Noise", written by Anne Dudley, Trevor Horn, J. J. Jeczalik, Gary Langan, Paul Morley, "Buffalo Stance" performed by Neneh Cherry and "Moments in Love" performed by Art of Noise.
- "Pretty Please" (Masters at Work remix) contains elements of "Percolator", performed by Cajmere and written by Curtis Alan Jones.
- "Boys Will Be Boys" (Zach Witness remix) incorporates elements of "Think (About It)", written by James Brown and samples "Think (About It)", performed by Lyn Collins.
- "Break My Heart / Cosmic Girl" (Dimitri from Paris edit) samples "Cosmic Girl" (Dimitri from Paris remix dubwize), performed by Jamiroquai.
- "Hallucinate" (Mr Fingers deep stripped mix) contains elements of "Another Man", written by Butch Ingram, and samples "Another Man" performed by Barbara Mason and "Hollaback Girl", performed by Gwen Stefani.
- "Hallucinate" (Paul Woolford remix) [extended] samples "The Sun Can't Compare", performed by Larry Heard presents Mr. White.
- "Don't Start Now" (Yaeji remix) contains elements of "Sing Sing", written by Thor Baldursson, Mats Bjoerklund and Jürgen Korduletsch and "Bring Down the Walls" by Fingers Inc. and Robert Owens, and samples "Sing Sing" performed by Gaz.
- "Kiss and Make Up" (remix) contains elements of "Rise" performed by Herb Alpert and produced by Herb Alpert and Randy Badass Alpert
- "That Kind of Woman" (Jacques Lu Cont remix) samples of "Stand Back", written by Stevie Nicks, performed by Stevie Nicks and produced by Jimmy Iovine.

== Personnel ==
=== Album ===
Credits adapted from the liner notes of Club Future Nostalgia.

- Madonna – additional vocals
- Missy Elliott – additional vocals, vocal recording (herself)
- Gwen Stefani – additional vocals
- The Blessed Madonna – DJ mix, remixing, additional production, drum programming, synthesizer
- Lauren D'Elia – engineering, vocal production (Madonna and Gwen Stefani), vocal recording (Gwen Stefani)
- Sean Solymar – assistant engineering
- Joe Goddard – remixing
- Jayda G – remixing
- Zach Witness – remixing
- Gen Hoshino – remixing
- Midland – remixing
- Masters at Work – remixing
- Horse Meat Disco – remixing
- Larry Heard – remixing
- Paul Woolford – remixing
- Yaeji – remixing
- Mark Ronson – remixing
- Jacques Lu Cont – remixing
- Moodymann – remixing
- Kaytranada – remixing
- Mike Dean – mixing, mastering
- Brandon Bost – mixing
- Randy Merrill – mastering
- Matt Colton – mastering

=== Visualizer ===
Credits adapted from YouTube.

- Blink Ink x Blink – production company
- James Papper – director
- Will Hooper – director
- Gareth Owen – producer
- Corin Taylor – producer
- Josef Byrne – executive producer
- Laura Northover – executive producer
- Rosanna Morley – production manager
- Seb Jowers – production manager
- Jamie Harris – editor
- Katie Dolan – commissioner
- Robin Velghe – artist collaborator
- Sucuk & Bratwurst – artist collaborator
- Jonathan Zawada – artist collaborator
- Actual Objects – artist collaborator
- Claire Cochran – artist collaborator
- Rick Farin – artist collaborator
- Nick Vernet – artist collaborator
- Connor Campbell – artist collaborator
- Robert Beatty – artist collaborator
- Mason London – artist collaborator
- Miza Roux – artist collaborator
- Ignasi Monreal – artist collaborator
- Saida Saetgar – artist collaborator
- Studio Dosage – artist collaborator
- Julian Glander – artist collaborator
- Victoria Vincent – artist collaborator
- Seo Young – artist collaborator

== Charts ==
Chart performance for Club Future Nostalgia
Chart (2020)	Peak position
Canadian Albums (Billboard)	13
US Billboard 200	28
US Top Dance Albums (Billboard)	1

== Release history ==
Release formats for Club Future Nostalgia
Region	Date	Format(s)	Label	Edition	Ref.
Various	28 August 2020	Digital download; streaming	Warner	DJ Mix	
Various	28 August 2020	Digital download; streaming	Warner	Visualizer	
Various	11 September 2020	Digital download; streaming	Warner	Standard	
Various	27 November 2020	LP	Warner	Standard	
Various	27 November 2020	CD	Warner	DJ Mix	

== See also ==
- List of Billboard number-one electronic albums of 2020
