= Harry Dennis (musician) =

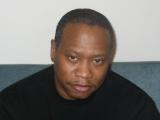

Background information
- Origin: Chicago, Illinois, United States
- Genres: House
- Occupation: Singer-songwriter
- Instrument: Vocals
- Years active: 1980s–present

Harry Dennis (sometimes spelled Harri) is a house music producer and lyricist from Chicago, United States, who was part of the original generation of house music in the late 1970s and early 1980s.

== Early life ==
Dennis is a native Chicagoan who completed his elementary and high school education in Chicago Public Schools (CPS). While attending Illinois State University (ISU), he incorporated drama and music into his core studies and became interested in songwriting and lyric development. In 1982, Dennis graduated from ISU, returned to Chicago to work, and began his music career. A frequent party-goer, he met Robert Williams, owner of The Warehouse, a local nightclub that catered to house music enthusiasts, where Dennis met and became friends with DJ Frankie Knuckles, Ron Hardy, and other leading members of the house music scene. Through these connections Dennis became a lyricist in the house scene.

== Early career ==
Dennis began his recording career in 1983, releasing the single "Donnie" in 1985. He formed a group named The It with Larry Heard and Robert Owens. "Donnie" was launched on the Chicago underground house scene (with Chip E. as producer) in 1985, quickly spreading to the east coast, and was distributed worldwide by DJ International in 1986.

During 1986–1989, Dennis was recruited to Trax Records by Marshall Jefferson. Together, they formed the group Jungle Wonz, recording the house hits "Time Marches On" and "Jungle".

In 1988, Fingers Inc., a group formed by Dennis, Heard, Owens, and Ron Wilson, released "Distant Planet" with Dennis as writer and vocalist. The single was released under the Indigo Music/Jack Trax label. Dennis also collaborated as a lyricist and vocalist with Owens and Heard to record the single "Gallimaufry Gallery", released on the Black Market International label. During 1990–1991, Dennis penned other house tracks in collaboration with Larry Heard. They recorded an album in London on the Big Life Records label, featuring "In This Place Called Nowhere", "Endless Journey", "Brazilian Love Dance", "Rain Forest Serenade", "When Will We Learn", "Endless Flight", "Living For The Man", and "Brazilian Love Dance (Interlude)". In 1993, Dennis collaborated with Marshall Jefferson again to release "Bird In a Gilded Cage" on Trax.

== Later career ==
Dennis returned from a sabbatical in 2005 with new material.

While working on a new album, Dennis appeared on Chicago House Radio, WHPK 88.5 FM, and Triton College. He provided voiceover on tracks for DJs. Dennis also performed live at various Chicago venues, including the Regal Theater, and often appeared with fellow house music performer Curtis McClain.

Dennis' business affiliations include house music executives such as Marshall Jefferson, Chauncey Alexander, and David Dee of Openhouse Recordings. Dennis and Jefferson released a new album on Openhouse in June 2011 entitled Jungle Wonz: The Jungle Sky EP, produced by Marshall Jefferson. This album included an updated version of the original "The Jungle" recording, along with several renditions of a new single, "Kiss the Sky", written by Dennis, McClain and Jefferson.

Following the 2012 release of his album, The Jungle Wonz: Deliverance, Dennis was featured on Chicago's Black Business Network, interviewed by founder and host, Sonja Perdue.

In 2013, Dennis wrote and released a new single, "No Matter", produced by Ricard Perez on the Epoque Music label.

In September 2014, Alleviated Records released an EP entitled The IT, another collaboration between Dennis and Larry Heard. The EP contains two tracks by Dennis entitled "Beauty in a Picture" and "Somebody Somewhere".

Dennis performed at the 2016 Chosen Few Picnic held July 2–3 in Chicago. In 2017, Dennis and IT member Ron Trent released three tracks: a single by The IT called "Monterrey" on the Future Vision World label, "Months of Mays" on the Music and Power label, and "Black Magic Woman" on Rush Hour Records.

== Discography ==
=== Singles ===
- 1986 – Donnie
- 1986 – The Jungle
- 1987 – Time Marches On
- 1988 – Distant Planet
- 1988 – Gallimaufry Gallery
- 1990 – In This Place Called Nowhere
- 1990 – Rainforest Serenade
- 1990 – Endless Journey
- 1990 – Brazilian Love Dance
- 1990 – Endless Flight
- 1990 – Living for the Man
- 1993 – Bird in a Gilded Cage
- 2011 – The Jungle (Remake)
- 2011 – Kiss The Sky
- 2012 – Up
- 2012 – The Jungle
- 2012 – Deliverance
- 2012 – Rainforest Serenade
- 2012 – Ancestors Walk
- 2012 – Time Marches On
- 2012 – 20 Paces From the Moon
- 2012 – Beautiful Nights
- 2012 – Mystic Voyage
- 2012 – Grey Afternoon
- 2012 – Season's Rain
- 2012 – Urban Blues
- 2012 – We're So Deep
- 2012 – Nights Like These
- 2012 – Get Up
- 2012 – Loving Every Moment (Just To Be With You)
- 2013 – Mystic Voyage (instrumental)
- 2013 – No Matter
- 2013 – Little Boy
- 2013 – She Got Problem
- 2014 – Somebody Somewhere
- 2014 – Beauty in a Picture
- 2015 – Spanish Sunrise
- 2015 – Funky Nursery Rhyme
- 2016 – Penderstreet Steppers vs. Harry Dennis
- 2017 - Months of Mays
- 2017 - Black magic Woman
- 2018 - Monterrey
- 2018 - Breeze
- 2024 - Infinitely
- 2025 - Her

=== Albums ===
- 1987 – Trax Records (Sampler)
- 1988 – Jungle Wonz (The Justin Strauss Remixes)
- 1988 – Fingers Inc. (Another Side)
- 1990 – The It (On Top of the World)
- 1995 – Mr. Fingers (Classic Fingers)
- 2011 – Jungle Wonz: The Jungle Sky EP
- 2012 – Jungle Wonz: Deliverance
- 2014 – The IT/EP
