= Another Side (Fingers Inc. album) =

Studio album by Fingers Inc.
- Released: 1988
- Studio: Seagrape
- Genre: House; deep house
- Length: 89:27
- Label: Jack Trax
- Producer: Larry Heard

Alternative cover
- Reissue cover

Another Side is the only studio album by American house music group Fingers Inc., released on Jack Trax in 1988. It is the first full-length house music album. "Can You Feel It" peaked at number 78 on the UK Singles Chart. The album was reissued by P-Vine Records in 2014 and by Alleviated Records in 2015.

== Critical reception ==
Professional ratings
Review scores
| Source | Rating |
|---|---|
| AllMusic | 4.5/5 stars |
| NME | 7.99/10 |
| Pitchfork | 8.8/10 |
| Record Mirror | 4/5 |
| Sounds | 4/5 stars |

John Bush of AllMusic called the album "an unabashed house classic." Andy Beta of Pitchfork gave the album an 8.8 out of 10, describing it as "a beacon of American dance music" and a pioneering work of the deep house style.

== Track listing ==
| No. | Title | Length |
|---|---|---|
| 1. | "Decision" | 4:46 |
| 2. | "Bye Bye" | 5:35 |
| 3. | "Never No More Lonely" | 5:29 |
| 4. | "Shadows" | 4:28 |
| 5. | "Another Side" | 5:49 |
| 6. | "So Glad" | 6:18 |
| 7. | "I'm Strong" | 5:21 |
| 8. | "A Love of My Own" | 6:00 |
| 9. | "Distant Planet" | 5:20 |
| 10. | "Feelin' Sleazy" | 5:00 |
| 11. | "Music Take Me Up" | 6:39 |
| 12. | "Mystery Friend" | 5:07 |
| 13. | "Mysteries of Love" | 6:28 |
| 14. | "A Path" | 5:39 |
| 15. | "Bring Down the Walls" | 5:36 |
| 16. | "Can You Feel It" | 5:45 |
| Total length: | | 89:27 |

== Personnel ==
Credits adapted from liner notes.

- Fingers Inc. – arrangement (except 2, 4, 6)
- Larry Heard – arrangement (2, 4, 6), keyboards, keyboard programming, drum programming, background vocals, production, mixing
- Robert Owens – lead vocals, background vocals, additional mixing assistance
- Ron Wilson – lead vocals, background vocals
- Harri Dennis – additional vocals (9)
- Mike Konopka – engineering, mixing
- Tommy White – engineering
