= Can You Feel It (Larry Heard song) =

- Fingers Inc. version cover

Single by Mr. Fingers

from the EP Washing Machine
- B-side: "Beyond the Clouds"
- Released: 1986
- Recorded: Chicago, Illinois, U.S.
- Genre: Chicago house; deep house
- Length: 5:45
- Label: Trax
- Songwriter: Larry Heard
- Producer: Larry Heard

"Can You Feel It" is a 1986 song by American DJ, record producer, and musician Mr. Fingers (a.k.a. Larry Heard) and one of the first deep house records. Its seminal impact on deep house has been compared to Derrick May's "Strings of Life" on Detroit techno.

== Production ==
Larry Heard created "Can You Feel It" using the Roland Juno-60 synthesizer and the Roland TR-909 drum machine. In a 2017 interview with Vice, he recalled, "I had two cassette decks—there were no digital recorders or even multi-track recorders—and I did one take, one pass, on one tape, then ran it back to the other one, played some other parts by hand that I wanted to add, and that was pretty much the recording process."

== Release ==
"Can You Feel It" was initially released as an instrumental on Mr. Fingers' 1986 EP, Washing Machine. The song later appeared on Fingers Inc.'s 1988 album Another Side.

There are two mash-up versions of the song: one using Chuck Roberts' speech from the a cappella version of Rhythm Control's "My House", and another using Martin Luther King Jr.'s "I Have a Dream" speech.

== Impact and legacy ==
In 1995, DJ Pierre named "Can You Feel It" one of his "classic cuts," saying, "When you hear this, it feels like you're on cloud nine. The track uses an organ played like strings – long chords held and not stabbed. Everyone who hears that song mellows out and returns to when things were perfect in their lives." Joey Beltram also named it one of his favourites the same year, adding, "I also heard this when I was about 14, maybe it was the following week. Mr Fingers was on the radio being played by the same DJ. It was a whole other vibe." In 1997, Darren Emerson included "Can You Feel It" in his top 10, adding, "I could have picked a different Mr Fingers track, I love everything he's done - with Robert Owens or by himself - he's one of my favourite artists. 'Can U Feel It' is on the 'Another Side' album, which is one of my favourite LPs. I picked this track because people will understand. I could have gone more anal and trainspotter but this one is a classic. It's hard to make a good record that's minimal; you can add things, but it doesn't necessarily make it better. The chords, funky little drum and Fingers bassline are great. He's my hero." The song was used in the 2004 video game Grand Theft Auto: San Andreas, and played on the radio station SF:UR.

In 2014, Rolling Stone included "Can You Feel It" on the "20 Best Chicago House Records" list. In 2015, Pitchfork ranked it number 76 on the "200 Best Songs of the 1980s" list. Pitchfork editor Patric Fallon wrote, "Vocalless in its original form, the 1986 single has no hook and eschews all semblance of pop structure, completely surrendering to an endless groove built on jazzy hi-hats and sumptuous chords." In 2017, Mixmag included it in the "Best 20 House Classics from Before 1990" list. In 2018, Time Out ranked it number five on the "20 Best House Tracks Ever" list. In 2019, Spin Magazine featured "Can You Feel It" on "The 40 Best Deep House Tracks of All Time" list. In 2020, NME included it on the "20 Best House Music Songs" list. NME editor El Hunt stated that the song is "commonly regarded as one of the first examples of deep house thanks to its meditative, ambient undercurrent." The same year, Slant Magazine ranked it number 68 on the "100 Best Dance Songs of All Time" list. In 2022, Rolling Stone ranked it number 70 in the "200 Greatest Dance Songs of All Time" list. In 2025, Billboard magazine ranked the song number three in their list of "The 50 Best House Songs of All Time".

== Track listing ==
- 7", UK (1988)
1. "Can You Feel It"
2. "My House" (Acappella)
- 12", UK (1988)
1. "Can You Feel It" (Vocal) – 5:53
2. "Can You Feel It" (Instrumental) – 5:55
3. "Can You Feel It" (Spoken Word: Dr. Martin Luther King Jr.) – 5:54
4. "Can You Feel It" (Accapella) – 5:10

== Charts ==
Chart (1988)	Peak position
UK Singles (OCC)	78
