= Cerebral Hemispheres (album) =

2018 Mr Fingers album

Studio album by Mr. Fingers
- Released: April 13, 2018
- Genre: Electronic
- Length: 100:06
- Label: Alleviated Records
- Producer: Larry Heard

Mr. Fingers chronology
Back to Love (1994)	Cerebral Hemispheres (2018)

Cerebral Hemispheres is a studio album by American musician Larry Heard, released under his Mr. Fingers moniker. It was released on Alleviated Records on April 13, 2018, and is his first studio album as Mr. Fingers since Back to Love in 1994.

== Critical reception ==
Professional ratings
Aggregate scores
Source	Rating
Metacritic	80/100
Review scores
Source	Rating
NPR	favorable
The Observer	4/5 stars
Resident Advisor	3.3/5
Spectrum Culture	3.25/5
Spin	favorable

At Metacritic, which assigns a weighted average score out of 100 to reviews from mainstream critics, the album received an average score of 80, based on 5 reviews, indicating "generally favorable reviews".

Matt McDermott of Resident Advisor wrote, "Though it's billed as the return of Mr. Fingers, Cerebral Hemispheres feels like a culmination of all the music he's made as Larry Heard." James Rettig of Stereogum described it as "an ambitious and sprawling album that crawls up to the two-hour mark, filled with lush and layered instrumentals that pull from soul and jazz and much more." Paul Mardles of The Observer stated that the album "combines the two dominant strands of his oeuvre – ambient soundscapes that reach for the stars, and refined, jazz-flecked songs that possess a mournful quality." He added, "while Cerebral Hemispheres won't win him new fans, it makes clear that, at 57, house's great survivor still has much to give."

Pitchfork included the album on the "Best Electronic Music of 2018" list.

== Track listing ==
All tracks are written by Larry Heard, except where noted.

Disc 1
No.	Title	Length
1.	"Full Moon"	6:44
2.	"City Streets"	6:30
3.	"Urbane Sunset"	6:17
4.	"Sands of Aruba"	4:39
5.	"Tiger Lounge"	4:23
6.	"A Day in Portugal"	5:28
7.	"Sao Paulo"	4:56
8.	"Crying Over You"	5:41
9.	"Cerebral Hemispheres"	5:40

Disc 2
No.	Title	Lyrics	Music	Length
1.	"Electron"			6:09
2.	"Outer Acid"			5:47
3.	"Inner Acid"			5:30
4.	"Spy"			4:51
5.	"Stratusfly"	Paul St. Hilaire	Larry Heard	5:07
6.	"Nodyahed"			5:56
7.	"Qwazars"			5:41
8.	"Aether"			6:14
9.	"Praise to the Vibes"	Nicole Wray	Larry Heard	4:42

== Personnel ==
Credits adapted from liner notes.

- Larry Heard – vocals, electric bass, melodica, keyboards, sequence programming, drum programming, engineering, executive production
- Zachary McElwain – tenor saxophone ("Full Moon", "Urbane Sunset", "Sands of Aruba")
- Christopher Charles Jones – electric guitar ("City Streets"), acoustic guitar ("City Streets")
- Ed Finney – electric guitar ("Urbane Sunset")
- Tiffany D. Curry – vocals ("Sands of Aruba", "A Day in Portugal", "Crying Over You")
- Paul St. Hilaire – vocals ("Stratusfly")
- Rich Reigel – electric guitar ("Stratusfly")
- Nicole Wray – vocals ("Praise to the Vibes")
- Rene Gelston – executive production
- Jeremy Nealis – cover artwork
- Cristina Hernández Capetillo – graphic design
