= List of Billboard number-one electronic albums of 2020 =

These are the albums that reached number one on the Billboard Dance/Electronic Albums chart in 2020.

== Chart history ==
Key
†	Indicates best-performing album of 2020

Issue date	Album	Artist	Reference
January 4	World War Joy	The Chainsmokers	
January 11	World War Joy	The Chainsmokers	
January 18	World War Joy	The Chainsmokers	
January 25	World War Joy	The Chainsmokers	
February 1	World War Joy	The Chainsmokers	
February 8	Hotspot	Pet Shop Boys	
February 15	World War Joy	The Chainsmokers	
February 22	World War Joy	The Chainsmokers	
February 29	World War Joy	The Chainsmokers	
March 7	Miss Anthropocene	Grimes	
March 14	The Fame	Lady Gaga	
March 21	The Fame	Lady Gaga	
March 28	World War Joy	The Chainsmokers	
April 4	World War Joy	The Chainsmokers	
April 11	The Fame	Lady Gaga	
April 18	Womb	Purity Ring	
April 25	The Fame	Lady Gaga	
May 2	The Fame	Lady Gaga	
May 9	The Fame	Lady Gaga	
May 16	The Fame	Lady Gaga	
May 23	The Fame	Lady Gaga	
May 30	The Fame	Lady Gaga	
June 6	The Fame	Lady Gaga	
June 13	Chromatica †	Lady Gaga	
June 20	Chromatica †	Lady Gaga	
June 27	Chromatica †	Lady Gaga	
July 4	Chromatica †	Lady Gaga	
July 11	Chromatica †	Lady Gaga	
July 18	Chromatica †	Lady Gaga	
July 25	Chromatica †	Lady Gaga	
August 1	Chromatica †	Lady Gaga	
August 8	Chromatica †	Lady Gaga	
August 15	Chromatica †	Lady Gaga	
August 22	Chromatica †	Lady Gaga	
August 29	Chromatica †	Lady Gaga	
September 5	Chromatica †	Lady Gaga	
September 12	Club Future Nostalgia	Dua Lipa and The Blessed Madonna	
September 19	Chromatica †	Lady Gaga	
September 26	Chromatica †	Lady Gaga	
October 3	Chromatica †	Lady Gaga	
October 10	Chromatica †	Lady Gaga	
October 17	Chromatica †	Lady Gaga	
October 24	Chromatica †	Lady Gaga	
October 31	Chromatica †	Lady Gaga	
November 7	Chromatica †	Lady Gaga	
November 14	Chromatica †	Lady Gaga	
November 21	Disco	Kylie Minogue	
November 28	Chromatica †	Lady Gaga	
December 5	Chromatica †	Lady Gaga	
December 12	Chromatica †	Lady Gaga	
December 19	Chromatica †	Lady Gaga	
December 26	Chromatica †	Lady Gaga	
