= Deep house =

Subgenre of house music that originated in the 1980s

- Stylistic origins: House; Chicago house; soul; jazz-funk; New York garage
- Cultural origins: 1985, Chicago, United States
- Derivative forms: Brazilian bass; future house; melodic house; outsider house; slap house; tech house; tribal house; tropical house; jazz house

Subgenres
- Euro deep house

Fusion genres
- Deep breaks

Deep house is a subgenre of house music that originated in the 1980s, initially fusing elements of Chicago house with the lush chords of 1980s jazz-funk and touches of soul music. Its origins are attributed to the early recordings of Larry Heard (aka Mr. Fingers), including his influential track "Can You Feel It".

== Characteristics ==
Deep house is known for tempos typically from 110 to 125 bpm, muted basslines, spacious use of percussion elements (typically using a Roland TR-909 drum machine), soft keyboard sounds (pads), use of advanced chord structures, ambient mixes, soulful vocals, and steady hypnotic repetition that notably avoids other dance genres' emphasis of energy build-up and release.

== History ==
Deep house was largely pioneered by Chicago producers such as Marshall Jefferson (On the House) and Larry Heard (Mr. Fingers) and with tracks such as "Mystery of Love" (1985) and "Can You Feel It?" (1986); the latter became internationally emblematic of deep house, much like Derrick May's "Strings of Life" (1987) did for Detroit techno. Many considered its gentler, more organic (yet still synthesizer based) production and instrument sounds close to jazz and soul. "Can You Feel It" became a deep house blueprint; Heard used a Roland Juno-60 synthesizer to create the deep bassline, along with a Roland TR-909 drum machine for the beats.

Author Richie Unterberger has stated that Heard's deep house sound moved house music away from its posthuman tendencies back towards the lush, soulful sound of early disco music (particularly that of old Philadelphia International and Salsoul records). DJ Ron Trent stated that the term was initially used to describe the DJ work of Frankie Knuckles and Ron Hardy, emphasising that despite early critics of house stereotyping it as an "eccentric" electronic genre, it in fact incorporated eclectic elements like disco, jazz, and underground music. However others, including Chicago DJ/producer Cornelius Ferguson (aka Corky “Traxman” Strong aka simply Traxman) point out that mid-80s deep house pioneers like Larry Heard and Marshall Jefferson were also producing more aggressive, percussive and electronic "jack tracks" (which provided the blueprints for Chicago's ghetto house, juke and footworking styles).

While Chicago defined and named both house and deep house, there were parallel developments in New York and New Jersey, where post-disco DJs and producers like Timmy Regisford, Boyd Jarvis, Larry Levan and Tony Humphries combined sophisticated soul song structures with extremely high production values and increasingly electronic instrumentation. Likewise in Detroit, a sophisticated house sound developed alongside the techno the city is better known for; deep house DJs Alton Miller and Chez Damier (who would become a regular production partner of Ron Trent's) were both early residents at the Music Institute alongside names better known for techno, while many names in the second wave of Detroit techno including Carl Craig, Blake Baxter, Kelli Hand and Stacey Pullen made soulful, instrumental house music too.

In the early 1990s, the Chicago house scene was evolving, and deeper, jazzier and more eclectic strains were emerging blending house with hip-hop, disco and soul. DJ Heather was a leading figure in this second wave, as were Derrick Carter and many artists associated with Cajmere and his Cajual label. In New York too, the sound evolved, with labels like Strictly Rhythm, Nu Groove, Nervous and 4th Floor becoming synonymous with deep house for international audiences. Throughout the 90s, deep house extensively cross-pollinated with other emerging club sounds internationally which emphasised jazz-inspired sophistication, including nu jazz and broken beat, as well as with experimental electronica via artists like Matthew Herbert and Terre Thaemlitz aka DJ Sprinkles.

In the 2000s and 2010s, the genre remained very popular. By around mid/late 2010s, however, the perception of the genre was resulting in a sense that some house music was being labeled "deep" inappropriately, and the term has since been used to encapsulate various types of bassline-driven house music, later named Brazilian bass, slap house or deep tech as the genre evolved from its historical origins. However throughout this period particular scenes and collectives around the world kept the more soul-focused, hypnotic sense of deep house. These included Theo Parrish, Moodymann and Rick Wilhite in Detroit; Jimpster, AtJazz and Phil Asher in the UK; Henrik Schwarz, Âme and Dixon in Germany, and the Mule Musiq label in Japan.

== Artists, DJs, and record labels ==
For a list of deep house producers and disc jockeys, see: Deep house musicians.

Record labels of the genre include Alleviated Records (Larry Heard), Madhouse Records. Inc (Kerri Chandler), AFTR:HRS, Glasgow Underground, Naked Music, Om Records, Peacefrog Records and Soma. Examples of deep house albums from artists known from other genres include The Martyr Mantras (1990) and Modernism: A New Decade (1989) from The Style Council.

== See also ==
- List of electronic music genres
- Club Zanzibar
