= Fingers Inc. =

American music group

- Origin: Chicago, Illinois, U.S.
- Genres: Chicago house; deep house
- Years active: 1985–1988
- Labels: Jack Trax; Select; D.J. International; Underground; Alleviated
- Past members: Larry Heard; Robert Owens; Ron Wilson

Fingers Inc. was an American music group hailing from Chicago, Illinois, comprising the producer Larry Heard and vocalists Robert Owens and Ron Wilson. Renowned for their pioneering deep house records, they emerged in the mid-1980s, notably with the release of the 1988 album 'Another Side' and hit singles like "Mystery Of Love" and the iconic "Can You Feel It?". AllMusic called it the "top early Chicago house group".

== History ==
Fingers Inc.'s history mirrors the low-profile approach of its creator, Larry Heard. In 1992, Kris Needs wrote an article titled "Larry Heard: House Music's Most Mysterious Pioneer" for Rock's Backpages, emphasizing Larry's status as one of the most enigmatic among the original house music pioneers. Despite a few interviews and critics' analyses, Fingers Inc.'s history exudes a mysterious vibe, a curious quality given the significant and enduring impact of their songs.

Fingers Inc. and Larry Heard, also known as Mr. Fingers, sometimes share an identity. The group originated in Chicago, Illinois, in 1985, initially formed by Larry Heard and Robert Owens, later officially completing its lineup with Ron Wilson's inclusion. The overlap occurred because Larry released some songs under the Fingers Inc. moniker, although he was the sole member working on those tracks. John Bush from AllMusic used to say that at their best they rivaled Ten City with expressive club hits.

While Owens primarily contributed as a vocalist to Fingers Inc., he also collaborated in producing and writing some tracks, fostering a strong bond with Larry. Kris Needs described Owens as someone who "exudes the larger-than-life charisma of the house diva" and Larry as "a shy, gentle man with an easy laugh," providing insight into their close relationship. Larry stated, "I suppose Robert (Owens) has been one of the most consistent and reliable I've met, and that's why we've worked together for so long".

Ron Wilson, who joined the group as a vocalist, played an essential role in Fingers Inc., leading vocals alongside Owens and contributing to the conceptualization of the sleeve cover for their only studio album, 'Another Side,' released in 1988.

In a 2016 NPR interview titled "Classic Dose: Larry Heard," Larry mentioned that a second Fingers Inc. album never materialized, partly due to Owens relocating to New York City. He shared, "For every song you heard from me and Robert, there's another 5-10 more that didn't get released." Larry expressed his intention to release this intriguing unreleased material through his label, Alleviated Records. An example of this is the track with Ron called "Chains," which was released in 2021 under Larry Heard's name and not as part of Fingers Inc.

'Another Side' ended up being considered among music critics as one of house music's greatest full-length albums of all time, often referred to as the gold standard of house LPs. This remarkable album and collaboration also marked the end of the group as they decided to continue their journey as solo artists.

Both Larry and Robert are still alive and active. Robert (Instagram, Bandcamp, SoundCloud) continues his career as a producer and DJ. In 2023 he collaborated on an album titled "The Wave" with Axe Syndicate. Larry (Instagram, SoundCloud) on the other hand, maintains a mysterious, low-profile presence but remains involved in relevant work. He contributed to projects like Dua Lipa's Club Future Nostalgia remix album and in 2023 released his album titled "Around the Sun Pt.12" under the moniker Mr. Fingers. Ron Wilson's life post-1990 is quite unknown. Despite being the son of Paul Wilson, a renowned baritone singer and original member of The Flamingos, and releasing a single - Prove it to me - produced by Larry under Alleviated Records in 1990, there is no official information, articles, interviews, or even social media available about his whereabouts. Curiously, his name has become entangled on Spotify and Apple Music with another Ron Wilson, a producer and DJ based in Berlin. Although both profiles share the same name, a more thorough investigation reveals that the new releases displayed on these platforms do not belong to Ron Wilson from Fingers Inc., but rather to the Ron Wilson based in Berlin. The older releases, however, can be attributed to Alleviated Records, unmistakably representing Ron Wilson from Fingers Inc.

== Discography ==
=== Studio albums ===
- 1988 – Another Side (Label: Jack Trax - 2017 Alleviated Records)

=== Singles ===
- 1985 – "Bring Down the Walls" (Label: Alleviated Records, Select Records)
- 1986 – "A Path" (Label: D.J. International Records)
- 1986 – "It's Over" (Label: Underground)
- 1986 – "Mystery of Love" (Label: Alleviated Records)
- 1987 – "A Love of My Own" (Label: Alleviated Records)
- 1987 – "Distant Planet" (Label: Jack Trax)
- 1987 – "I'm Strong" (Label: Alleviated Records)
- 1988 – "Can You Feel It" (Label: Jack Trax)
- 1988 – "So Glad" (Label: Jack Trax)
- 1989 – "Never No More Lonely" (Label: Jack Trax)
- 1996 – "Washing Machine" (Label: Trax Records)
