= Mystery of Love (Larry Heard song) =

Single by Mr. Fingers
- Released: 1985
- Recorded: 1984
- Genre: House
- Length: 6:54
- Label: Alleviated
- Songwriter: Larry Heard
- Producers: Larry Heard; Donnie Heard

"Mystery of Love" is a house music song created by Larry Heard under the alias of Mr. Fingers. It was released by Heard's label Alleviated Records in 1985. The track was developed in 1984 after Heard felt his creative input was not being incorporated into the rock music cover bands he had been drumming in. This led to Heard buying a Roland Jupiter-6 and developing two tracks in one night: "Washing Machine" and "Mystery of Love" which he recorded to via tape cassettes. Cassette tapes of these tracks were given to musicians local Chicago DJs and became popular at dance clubs in Chicago.

The track was re-recorded by Heard in a studio with his friend Robert Owens adding vocals to the track and was credited to Fingers Inc. This version was released in 1986 on DJ International Records and became a top ten hit on the Hot Dance/Disco 12 Inch Singles chart in 1986. In the United Kingdom, initial reception to the Fingers Inc. was not enthusiastic, until the song was included on the compilation The House Sound of Chicago which increased its popularity dramatically in the United Kingdom.

== Production ==
=== Background ===
When Larry Heard was growing up he had a piano in his house and as a child would try to emulate television show theme songs. Heard would later learn to play guitar and quickly moved on to the bass, and then to drums, where he felt most comfortable. Heard initially was interested in pursuing a career as either a teacher, a lawyer, or an architect but moved on to playing drums in local groups. Later Heard became interested in starting to put some distance in between him and some of the groups, stating that in his last group he found himself "having to buy [his] own synthesizer, and then buy a drum machine to keep the time since I wasn't gonna be able to hold the sticks and do the keyboard part." Heard's first synthesizer purchased was a Roland Jupiter-6.

=== Production ===
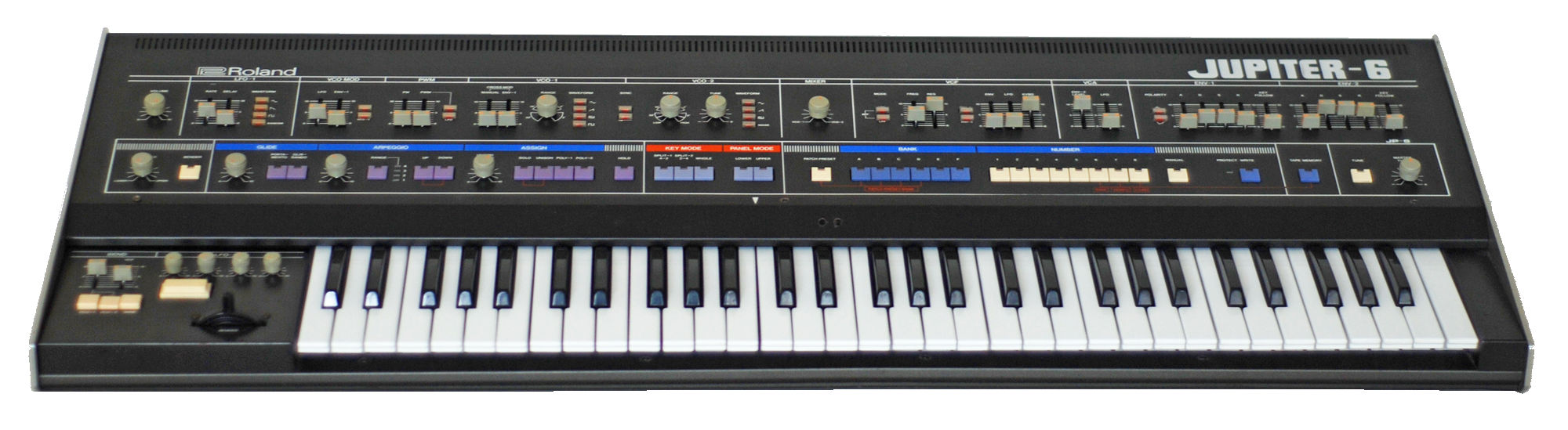
"Mystery of Love" was created on a Roland Jupiter-6 synthesizer

On the first night of purchasing the synthesizer in 1984, Heard created "Mystery of Love" and "Washing Machine", which he described as "my first drafts ever. I was lucky enough to catch it on a cassette tape, which has been lost since then, of course." Heard described the influence to make these tracks, as he "always had ideas when I was behind the drums, but the other band members weren't really receptive, again, to the drummer having ideas, and I think there's pretty much rich history of drummers, like Phil Collins, and Narada Michael Walden, and people like that, that step out. But you have to express your ideas, or it's not fulfilling." The tracks were recorded to two cassette decks with one pass on one cassette, and then, once Heard decided what he wanted over the top, he ran the next pass, and played the parts live. Heard reflected on these recordings in 2016, describing both "Mystery of Love" and "Washing Machine" as a "happy accident, a product of youthful excitement" due to his excitement to work on new equipment and the lessons learned from listening to his parents play the piano.

There are multiple iterations of "Mystery of Love". The first was an original version, which Heard described as his "personal prototype" which he made three acetate copies of, one copy owned by Heard, and others given to Chicago DJs Frankie Knuckles, Ron Hardy. According to Heard, these acetates have changed hands several times. The 1985 version of the track is at a slow tempo, at about 110 beats per minute. A second version was credited to Fingers Inc. and made for the label DJ International Records. This version was re-recorded in a studio with vocals by Heard's friend Robert Owens. This version is credited to Fingers Inc. Heard felt that " the first one is just special for me, it just holds the essence of what I was doing, what just naturally flowed out of me. The next ones ended up being more rehearsed, so I don't really feel the same intensity in those versions, but that's showbiz, I guess."

== Release ==
Heard sent out the tape to some music labels with no response and was suggested by a friend to release the record on his own. The original releases of Heard's first track did not have a label attached to them, with Heard recalling that he "didn't know how you go about establishing a name, and that kind of a thing. But I did start my publishing off, so I ended up deciding to use the publishing name as the label name since I got clearance for the name." Heard has declared the first version as being attached to his own label Alleviated Records, despite any credit on the label. The track was officially released in 1985. Heard would then soon hear the track on the radio, and recalled hearing "Mystery of Love" on the radio while driving on Lakeshore Drive and he nearly drove himself off the road he was so excited.

The Mr.Fingers version on "Mystery of Love" released by D.J. International entered the Billboard's Hot Dance/Disco 12 Inch Singles sales charts on April 19, 1986, and peaked at number 10 on the charts.

== Reception ==
Heard stated that the reception of "Mystery of Love" was so great that Ron Hardy and Frankie Knuckles were claiming that they had made the song. Heard joked that he had "kind of foil everything for both of them, when people who knew me saying this was the guy who made the "Mystery of Love" track. So, that kind of put a little tension in the relationship between myself and Frankie and Ron Hardy. Not from my perspective, but I think they maybe always felt like I would harbour some resentment for that, but to me it was more of a compliment. I mean, who would claim something that they feel is crap? So it confirmed for me that I was at something, that I was onto something that people could relate to."

Jon Savage commented on the song's initial reception in the United Kingdom, stating that the track at first "seemed wrong" with its slower tempo, noting the audiences expectations for the "cranked up nature of the Go-Go scene or new-breed rappers like Schoolly D. It wasn't a brash assertion of ego or a frantic call to the dancefloor, more an ecstatic (in the old sense) vision couched in a radical, fluid sound world." Savage continued that it took a little while for the song to become part of what would later be known as house music, specifically noting that after Farley "Jackmaster" Funk's record with Darryl Pandy "Love Can't Turn Around" entered the top ten in the United Kingdom, London Records released the compilation The House Sound of Chicago in October 1986 which included the Fingers Inc. version of "Mystery of Love" along with Daryl Pandy's hit.

In 2025, Billboard magazine ranked "Mystery of Love" number 18 in their list of "The 100 Best Dance Songs of All Time".

== Track listing ==
- 12" single (ML-2201)
1. "Mystery of Love" – 6:54
2. "Mystery of Love" – 7:07
- 12" single (DJ 892)
1. "Mystery of Love (Club Mix)"
2. "Mystery of Love (Mystery of Dub)"
3. "Mystery of Love (Instrumental Mix)"
4. "Mystery of Love (Original Basement Mix)"

== Credits ==
Credits adapted from the vinyl sticker of the "Mr. Fingers" version of Mystery of Love.

- Larry Heard – producer, composer
- Donnie Heard – producer
- Joseph McNeil – recording and mixing
- Bud Pressner – mastering

Credits adapted from the vinyl sticker of the "Fingers Inc." version of Mystery of Love.

- Larry Heard – producer, composer, mixing
- Robert Owens – vocals
- Rocky Jones – executive producer, mixing
- Verne Lindsey – executive producer
- Larry Strum – engineer

== Sources ==
- Brewster, Bill; Broughton, Frank (2014). Last Night a DJ Saved My Life: The History of the Disc Jockey (Updated and Revised ed.). Grove Press. ISBN 978-0802146106.
- Janson, Gerd (2005). "Larry Heard". Red Bull Music Academy.
- Leight, Elias (October 12, 2016). "Larry Heard on Kanye West Sampling Him For 'Fade' & Mr. Fingers' Rebirth". Billboard. Archived from the original on June 19, 2019.
- Ravens, Chal. "Larry Heard (2018)". Red Bull Music Academy. Archived from the original on February 11, 2026.
- Savage, Jon (March 2, 2010), "Jon Savage on song: Fingers, Inc – Mystery of Love (Club Version)", The Guardian, archived from the original on December 20, 2015
