= Larry Heard =

American DJ, record producer and musician (born 1960)

- Also known as: Mr. Fingers; Loosefingers; Gherkin Jerks; Trio Zero
- Born: Larry Heard; May 31, 1960 (age 66); Chicago, Illinois, U.S.
- Genres: Chicago house; deep house; electronic
- Occupations: DJ; record producer
- Years active: 1983–present
- Labels: Trax; D.J. International; MCA; Black Market International; Allevated

Larry Heard (born May 31, 1960) is an American DJ, record producer, and musician who has recorded under various names, most notably Mr. Fingers. He is widely known as a pioneering figure in 1980s house music, and was leader of the influential group Fingers Inc., whose 1988 album Another Side was the first long-form house LP. He is regarded as a progenitor of the deep house subgenre, bridging the gap between the futurism of house and the lush sound of disco. His landmark 1986 single "Can You Feel It" would be a major influence on dance music.

== Early life ==
Born on the South Side of Chicago, Heard grew up hearing jazz and Motown at home, and could play several instruments from a young age. Before beginning his solo musical career in 1983, he was the drummer, at the age of 17, in the band Infinity (a jazz fusion cover group that included Adonis). He is sometimes cited as having been a member of the Manhattan Transfer, but Heard has denied this, saying, "[I] filled in for somebody on one show." He also worked for the US government as a benefit authorizer, which enabled him to buy his first pieces of studio equipment.

== Musical career ==
As a drummer with live bands, Heard's creativity was suppressed by the nature of his role. According to Heard, “I guess it wasn’t customary for the drummer to have musical ideas…I ended up having to buy my own synthesizer and a drum machine”. Within days of purchasing a Roland Juno-60 synthesizer and TR-909 drum machine in 1984, Heard had recorded three tracks that would become milestones in the deep house genre: "Can You Feel It", "Mystery of Love", and "Washing Machine." Despite initially not having a connection to Chicago's club scene, he eventually met singer and DJ Robert Owens at a party and the two formed the group Fingers Inc. along with singer/dancer Ron Wilson. The group would release the double LP Another Side in 1988. Around this time, Heard also began releasing solo singles as Mr. Fingers on Trax Records and DJ International. At the end of the decade, Trax released Ammnesia (1989), which compiled Heard's early tracks; it was released without Heard's permission. Heard reissued the album in 2022 on his own Alleviated label, marking its first authorized release. In 1989, Heard contributed to the debut album by producer Lil' Louis.

In 1990, he recorded an album with Harry Dennis as The It before setting out on his own, signing with MCA Records as a solo act in 1991 and releasing his first official Mr. Fingers album Introduction in 1992 to international success. After the label interfered with the production of his Mr. Fingers follow-up album "Back To Love", he released the less dance-oriented album Sceneries Not Songs, Vol. 1 in 1994 under his given name. He continues to record, releasing the Mr. Fingers album Leev Ur Mynd in 2026. Much of Heard's music has been released and re-released under different names, including Loosefingers, Fingers, House Factors, and Trio Zero.

== Discography ==
=== as Mr. Fingers ===
==== Studio albums ====
- Ammnesia (1989)
- Introduction (1992)
- Back to Love (1994)
- Cerebral Hemispheres (2018)
- Around the Sun, Pt.1 (2022)
- Around the Sun, Pt.2 (2023)
- Leev Ur Mynd (2026)

==== Compilations ====
- Classic Fingers (1995)

==== EPs ====
- 6 Tack E.P. (1988)
- Mr. Fingers 2 (1991)

==== Singles ====
- "Mystery of Love" (1985)
- "Washing Machine" (1986)
- "Slam Dance" (1987)
- "What About This Love" (1989)
- "Ammnesia" (1989)
- "Love and Juice" (1989)
- "Closer" (1992)
- "On My Way" (1992)
- "On a Corner Called Jazz" (1992)
- "Dead End Alley" (1992)
- "I Need You" (1994)

=== as Larry Heard ===
==== Studio albums ====
- Sceneries Not Songs Volume One (1994)
- Sceneries Not Songs Volume Tu (1995)
- Alien (1996)
- Dance 2000 (1997)
- Dance 2000 Part 2 (1998)
- Genesis (1999)
- Love's Arrival (2001)
- Where Life Begins (2003)
- Loose Fingers: Soundtrack from the Duality Double-Play (2005)

==== EPs ====
- The Calm & Chaos EP (1997)
- Dance 2000: The Glasgow Connection (1998)
- Dance 2000: The Chicago Connection (1999)
- 25 Years from Alpha (2008)
- Distance Revisited EP (2012)

==== Singles ====
- "Black Oceans" (1994)
- "Missing You" (2000)
- "Direct Drive" / "Time Machine" (2001)
- "Another Night (Re-Edit)" (2001)
- "Praise" (2002)
- "Space Jungle" (2003)
- "Reminisce" (2003)
- "Evening Dance" (2003)
