= Robert Owens (musician) =

American record producer and singer (born 1961)

- Born: Robert James Owens; August 17, 1961 (age 64); Ohio, U.S.
- Genres: House; techno; electronic
- Occupations: Singer; songwriter; record producer; DJ
- Years active: 1985–present

Robert Owens (born August 17, 1961) is an American songwriter, record producer, DJ and singer, best known for his work with the Chicago house group Fingers Inc. in the mid-1980s. As a solo artist, he has placed several songs on the Hot Dance Music/Club Play chart, two of which hit number-one: "I'll Be Your Friend" (1992), and "Mine to Give" (2000), a collaboration with Photek).

== Biography ==
Though electronica has typically been a producer's medium (and the few vocalists who succeed are usually women), Robert Owens became one of the people associated with the late-1980s golden era of Chicago house. Born in Ohio, United States, Robert Owens grew up singing in church, but years later, he was working as a DJ in 1985, when he met Chicago producer Larry Heard. The pair formed Fingers Inc., along with Ron Wilson, and they released a few singles ("You're Mine"/"It's Over") plus the 1988 album, Another Side. The group disbanded quickly, as Heard's burgeoning solo-production career (as Mr. Fingers) took priority.

Owens had already released recordings on his own - "Bring Down the Walls" and "I'm Strong" made for Alleviated (with production from Heard), and he signed a solo contract with 4th & B'way Records. His 1990 album Rhythms in Me lost visibility soon after within the quickly disintegrating Chicago house scene. (One of his best-known features of the late 1980s, "Tears", appeared with the names of Frankie Knuckles and producer Satoshi Tomiie.)

By 1996, he had returned to dance music with "Ordinary People": a two-part EP recording for Musical Directions. He joined up with Tomiie (again) and Cevin Fisher in 1999, to make a track from Tomiie's Full Lick LP. One year later, in 2000, Owens appeared on the Photek hit "Mine to Give".

In 2003, he joined with drum and bass act London Elektricity to provide the vocals for their album Billion Dollar Gravy.

He collaborated with Coldcut on their album Sound Mirrors, on the track "Walk a Mile in My Shoes" in 2006.

He collaborated with Rob Pearson on single "Escape from the Madness" which was released on Plastic City in 2007.

In 2011, he collaborated with the Brookes Brothers on their single "Beautiful", which was released on the Breakbeat Kaos label. Later on in the same year he collaborated with Dutch drum and bass producer Icicle, and featured on the tracks "Step Forward" and "Redemption", which appeared on Icicle's debut album Under the Ice released in April 2011 on Shogun Audio.

In 2012, he featured on Mosca's song "Accidentally" from the Eva Mendes EP and on Orgue Electronique's album Strange Paradise with the song "Our House".

In 2013, he released the single "Trusting Me" taken from the vocal collaboration album Features by Kris Menace. The video of the single was premiered by MTV Iggy in the US.

== Discography ==
Albums

- Rhythms in Me (1990)
- The Journey (1996)
- Night-Time Stories (2008)
- Art (2010)

== See also ==
- List of number-one dance hits (United States)
- List of artists who reached number one on the US Dance chart
