= Fat Trel discography =

This is the discography of American hip hop musician Fat Trel.

== Mixtapes ==
List of mixtapes, with year released
Title	Mixtape details
Noska Musik	Released: 2009; Label: Self-Released; Format: digital download
Youngest Runnin' The City (with Slutty Boyz)	Released: March 28, 2010; Label: Self-Released; Format: digital download
No Secrets	Released: September 5, 2010; Format: digital download
April Foolz	Released: April 1, 2011; Label: Self-Released; Format: digital download
Nightmare On E Street	Released: March 26, 2012; Label: Self-Released; Format: digital download
New World Order (with Louie V Mob)	Released: February 12, 2013; Label: No Limit Forever Records; Format: digital download
SDMG	Released: August 19, 2013; Label: Slutty Boyz; Format: digital download
Gleesh	Released: April 1, 2014; Label: Maybach Music Group, Slutty Boyz; Format: digital download
Georgetown	Released: June 9, 2015; Label: Maybach Music Group, Slutty Boyz; Format: digital download
Muva Russia	Released: December 25, 2015; Label: Maybach Music Group, Slutty Boyz; Format: digital download
SDMG 2	Released: June 28, 2016; Label: Maybach Music Group, Slutty Boyz; Format: digital download
Fat & Ugly (with Yowda)	Released: January 27, 2017; Label: Maybach Music Group, Slutty Boyz; Format: digital download
Finally Free	Released: July 13, 2018; Label: Maybach Music Group, Slutty Boyz; Format: digital download
On The Run	Released: October 8, 2018; Label: Maybach Music Group, Slutty Boyz; Format: digital download
On The Run 2	Released: December 21, 2018; Label: Maybach Music Group, Slutty Boyz; Format: digital download
1901	Released: July 5, 2019; Label: Maybach Music Group, Slutty Boyz; Format: Digital download
Big Homie	Released: June 26, 2020; Label: Maybach Music Group, Slutty Boyz; Format: Digital download
Fat & Ugly 2 (with Yoda)	Released: September 7, 2020; Label: Maybach Music Group, Slutty Boyz; Format: Digital download
Nightmare on E Street 2	Released: June 9, 2023; Label: Slutty Boyz, MGE The Label, Asylum Records; Format: Digital Download
Boosa's Keeper	Released: August 30, 2024; Label: Slutty Boyz, MGE The Label, Asylum Records; Format: Digital Download

== Singles ==
List of singles, showing year released and album name
Title	Year	Mixtape
"Bitch Niggaz"	2013	—N/a
"Make It Clap"	2013	—N/a
"She Fell In Love"	2013	Gleesh
"Broccoli Freestyle"	2016	Non-album single
"Large Amounts"	2018	Finally Free

== Guest appearances ==
List of non-single guest appearances, with other performing artists, showing year released and album/mixtape name.
Title	Year	Other artist(s)	Album/Mixtape
"The Posse Cut (Who Don't)"	2010	Wale, Black Cobain	More About Nothing
"Good Night"	2011	King Los, Skarr	Worth The Wait
"Up In Here"	2012	Red Café	Hell's Kitchen
"Russian Roulette"	2012	Chief Keef	For Greater Glory Vol. 1
"Coke and White Bitches: Chapter 2"	2012	A$AP Mob, Danny Brown, Gunplay	Lord$ Never Worry
"Still On"	2012	Smoke DZA	K.O.N.Y.
"Don't Make No Sense"	2012	Chief Keef, Master P	Finally Rich
"Ganstad Need Love Too"	2013	Master P, Alley Boy	Al Capone
"Be the Best"	2013	Master P, Miss Chee	Fredo Kruger
"Fuck These Bitches"	2013	Fredo Santana	Fredo Kruger
"Deep In the Game"	2013	Harry Fraud	Adrift
"Everyday"	2013	Blood Money, Fredo Santana, Gino Marley	Choppa Talk: 1 on 1 and Street Shit
"Situation"	2013	Blood Money	Choppa Talk: 1 on 1
"MFS"	2013	Wale	The Gifted
"Can't Trust a Soul"	2013	K Smith	Aphillyated
"It's Real"	2013	King Chip	44108
"All We See Is Green"	2013	Young Chop, Johnny May Cash, YB	Precious
"8 Balls & Quaters"	2013	Millyz	Future Memories
"Game Over"	2014	Young Breed, Rick Ross	Seven Tre Chevrolet
"Clappers"(Remix)	2014	Wale, Rick Ross, Young Thug	—N/a
"Pimp Tight"	2014	Slutty Boyz, Juicy J	Da New Kool
"I Swear"	2014	Slutty Boyz	Da New Kool
"Luv My Gang"	2014	Slutty Boyz	Da New Kool
"Finals 2"	2014	Rick Ross, Wale, Gunplay, Rockie Fresh, Tracy T, French Montana	—N/a
"All I Got (Remix)"	2014	Young Chop	—N/a
"Quarterback"	2014	Red Café	—N/a
"MMM (Remix)"	2015	Cassidy, Fred Money, Vado, Red Café, Papoose, Maino, Uncle Murda, J.R. Writer, Fred the Godson, Chubby Jag, Drag-On, Dave East, Compton Menace	—N/a
"Lights Out"	2015	Chris Brown, Tyga	Fan of a Fan: The Album
"Check (Maybach Music Group feat. Fat Trel)"	2016	Rick Ross and Young Dolph	Priorities 5
"Gaithersburg Freestyle"	2023	Logic, C Dot Castro, Big Lenbo and Ade	College Park
