= Back from the Dead (mixtape) =

Mixtape by Chief Keef
- Released: March 12, 2012
- Recorded: 2011–2012
- Genres: Drill; trap; gangsta rap
- Length: 42:41
- Label: Glory Boyz Entertainment
- Producer: Young Chop

Chief Keef chronology
Bang (2011)	Back from the Dead (2012)	Finally Rich (2012)

Singles from Back from the Dead
- 1. "I Don't Know Dem" Released: January 25, 2012; 2. "I Don't Like" Released: March 6, 2012; 3. "Everyday" Released: April 6, 2012; 4. "Save That Shit" Released: April 24, 2012; 5. "Monster" Released: June 13, 2012

Back from the Dead is the fifth mixtape by American hip-hop recording artist Chief Keef. The mixtape was produced by Young Chop and hosted by DJ Victoriouz and DJ Moondawg. It was released on March 12, 2012, on DatPiff and iTunes. The mixtape features guest appearances from Lil Reese, Soulja Boy, King Louie, SD, Johnny May Cash, and Yale Lucciani.

"I Don't Know Dem" was the first song included on the mixtape. Its music video was released on YouTube by A Zae Productions on January 25, 2012, with over 30 million views as of April 2026. "I Don't Like", featuring Lil Reese, was included on the mixtape in March and was released as a single. It peaked at number 73 on the Billboard Hot 100 and is included on his debut album, Finally Rich. The official remix to "I Don't Like" features Kanye West, Pusha T, Big Sean, and Jadakiss and is included on the GOOD Music collaboration album Cruel Summer. As of October 31, 2014, the mixtape has been downloaded over 683,000 times on DatPiff and certified double platinum.

In February 2014, Keef confirmed via Twitter (X) that the sequel mixtape titled Back from the Dead 2 was in the works with a release date set for sometime in 2014. The sequel was released on October 31, 2014, and was completely produced by Chief Keef, other than 4 tracks produced by Young Chop, Purps On Da Beat, and Ace Bankz. It also has only two features, with Gucci Mane and Tadoe of Chief Keef's own label, Glo Gang.

== Reception ==
=== Critical response ===
Jordan Sargent at Pitchfork Media said in a review, "Back From the Dead, his breakthrough mixtape is loud, rough, unrelenting, lurching, and undeniably the child of Waka Flocka Flame and producer Lex Luger's indelible Flockaveli. But if you read the title more literally to mean that Keef is something like a zombie, it's maybe even more appropriate. Surrounded by beats from producer Young Chop that are stuffed with the sound of gunshots and Keef's choice ad-lib, "Bang Bang," he's close to stoic throughout, stalking expressionless through the streets."

=== Accolades ===
The mixtape was named the 11th best mixtape of 2012 by DatPiff. DatPiff also positioned Lil Reese's certified gold mixtape "Don't Like", hosted by DJ Drama and Don Cannon, at 44th on their "50 Best Mixtapes of 2012" list. Both mixtapes were produced by Chicago producer Young Chop and included the hit single, "I Don't Like".

=== Other responses ===
In October and December 2013, Lady Gaga uploaded a few videos on her Instagram account in which she is listening to Keef's song "3Hunna" from the mixtape. Later, in an AMA interview, she said, "I've been listening to a lot of Chief Keef, so I'm kind of into Chicago music right now, I was living there for a while, so we've been listening to a lot of his records. I'm a big fan." Keef returned the praise via Twitter shortly thereafter, stating, "I love Lady Gaga For Sayin She Listens to a lot of me and What's so crazy I was jus Watchin Dis redcarpet shit Like damn dis Girl fine," adding, "Love You Lady Gaga."

== Track listing ==
All tracks were produced by Young Chop.

No.	Title	Writer(s)	Length
1.	"Monster"	Keith Cozart; Tyree Pittman	3:35
2.	"My Niggas" (featuring SD aka Stack-D)	Cozart; Pittman; Sadiki Thirston	3:56
3.	"Sosa"	Cozart; Pittman	3:20
4.	"Winnin'" (featuring King Louie)	Cozart; Pittman; Louis Johnson	3:58
5.	"I Don't Like" (featuring Lil Reese)	Cozart; Pittman; Tavares Taylor	5:21
6.	"True Religion Fein" (featuring Yale Lucciani)	Cozart; Pittman; Yale Lucciani	4:00
7.	"Designer"	Cozart; Pittman	2:22
8.	"I Don't Know Dem"	Cozart; Pittman	4:15
9.	"Everyday"	Cozart; Pittman	3:29
10.	"Trust None" (featuring Johnny May Cash)	Cozart; Pittman; Johnny May Cash	2:48
11.	"Save That Shit"	Cozart; Pittman	3:33
12.	"3Hunna (Remix)" (featuring Soulja Boy)	Cozart; Pittman; Way	3:34
Total length:			42:41
