= Supa Savage =

Mixtape by Lil Reese
- Released: September 2, 2013
- Recorded: 2013
- Genres: Hip hop; drill; trap
- Length: 30:54
- Labels: Glory Boyz; 3hunna
- Producers: Young Chop; Yung Lan; Leek-E-Leek; Natural Disaster; Trap Blanco Beatz; Mista Midnight; Tarentino; Marvin Cruz

Lil Reese chronology
Don't Like (2012)	Supa Savage (2013)	Straight Outta Chiraq (2015)

Supa Savage is the second mixtape by American rapper Lil Reese, released on September 2, 2013. The mixtape features guest appearances from Chief Keef, Lil Durk, Waka Flocka Flame, Wale, Johnny May Cash and Fredo Santana. It is hosted by Maybach Music Group's DJ Scream. There has been 6 music videos shot for the mixtape, for the songs "Relate", "Team", "Wassup", "Irrelevant", "Supa Savage" and "I Need That" which all premiered on WorldStarHipHop as music videos.

== Background ==
Supa Savage was officially hosted via LiveMixtapes and DatPiff. It was originally supposed to be released on August 20, but was pushed back to September 2 for unknown reasons.

== Critical response ==
Professional ratings
Review scores
Source	Rating
BET	4/5 stars

Jake John from BET gave the mixtape 4 stars in a review, saying: "At just a shade over a half-hour long, Reese offers just enough Supa Savage to leave you itching for more. And considering all ten songs maintain that same bass-heavy southern tempo, the brevity prevents the mixtape's redundancy from becoming self-defeating. While Supa Savage may not be the most innovative or versatile mixtape, it does serve a purpose. Hip hop heads that came up on sharp one liners and witty wordplay probably won't find much use for it, but for those who embrace all things raunchy and ratchet, this is definitely a call to get wild."

== Music videos ==
There has been 6 music videos shot for the mixtape, for the songs "Relate", "Wassup" featuring Fredo Santana and Lil Durk, "Supa Savage", "I Need That", "Team" and "Irrelevant" featuring Johnny May Cash which all premiered on WorldStarHipHop. "Relate", "Wassup", "Team" were all directed by A Zae Production. "I Need That" was directed by Blind Folks Vision and "Irrelevant" was directed by Paul John. "Relate" was released in 2012. "Wassup" featuring Fredo Santana and Lil Durk, "Supa Savage", "I Need That" and "Team" were released in 2013. "Irrelevant" Featuring Johnny May Cash was released in 2014.

== Track listing ==
No.	Title	Writer(s)	Producer(s)	Length
1.	"Supa Savage"	Tavares Taylor	Yung Lan	2:00
2.	"Irrelevant" (featuring Johnny May Cash)	Taylor; Tyrone Pittman	Young Chop	3:25
3.	"Team"	Taylor	Leek-e-Leek	2:45
4.	"Wassup" (featuring Fredo Santana and Lil Durk)	Taylor; Derrick Coleman; Durk Banks	Natural Disaster	4:45
5.	"I Need That"		Trap Blanco Beatz	2:48
6.	"What It Look Like" (featuring Chief Keef)		Mista Midnight	3:16
7.	"Relate"		Natural Disaster	3:15
8.	"We Won't Stop" (featuring Chief Keef)		Tarantino	2:58
9.	"Waddam" (featuring Fredo Santana)		Marvin Cruz	3:06
10.	"No Lackin, Money Stackin" (featuring Waka Flocka Flame and Wale)		Young Chop	4:16
