= Trappin Ain't Dead =

Studio album by Fredo Santana
- Released: October 31, 2013
- Recorded: 2012–2013
- Genre: Trap; drill
- Length: 56:57
- Label: Savage Squad
- Producer: Big K; Dirty Vans; DJ Kenn (All Or Nothing/A.O.N); Lex Luger; Marvin Cruz; Murda Beatz; Tarentino; Vince Carter; Young Chop

Fredo Santana chronology
Trappin Ain't Dead (2013)	Fredo Krueger 2 (2017)

Singles from Trappin Ain't Dead
- 1. "Jealous" Released: October 31, 2013

Trappin Ain't Dead is the debut studio album by American rapper Fredo Santana. It was released on October 31, 2013, by Fredo Santana's own label, Savage Squad Records. The album features production from Murda Beatz, Young Chop, Lex Luger and DJ Kenn (All Or Nothing/A.O.N). It features guest appearances from Kendrick Lamar, Chief Keef and Lil Herb (aka G Herbo), among others.

== Background ==
Santana initially announced the release of the album on Twitter, with a release set for Halloween 2013. The tracklist was also revealed through Santana's Twitter account on October 30, showing features from Kendrick Lamar, Chief Keef and Lil Herb, among others.

== Singles ==
The lead and only single from the album, "Jealous", which features fellow rapper Kendrick Lamar, was released on October 31, 2013.

== Commercial performance ==
Trappin Ain't Dead debuted at #45 on the Top R&B/Hip-Hop albums chart on December 7, 2013, and stayed on the chart for one week.

== Track listing ==
Trappin Ain't Dead track listing
No.	Title	Writer(s)	Producer(s)	Length
1.	"Trap Boy"	Derrick Coleman; Shane Lindstrom	Murda Beatz	2:11
2.	"Jealous" (featuring Kendrick Lamar)	Coleman; Kendrick Duckworth; Chance Youngblood	Tarentino	4:19
3.	"Ova Here"	Coleman; Lindstrom	Murda Beatz	3:18
4.	"Playin' wit a Sack"	Coleman; Kenichi Shibuya	DJ Kenn A.O.N	3:07
5.	"Came up from Nothing"	Coleman; Lexus Lewis	Lex Luger	2:06
6.	"Gang Bang"	Coleman; Tyree Pittman	Young Chop	4:15
7.	"History"	Coleman; Marvin Cruz	Cruz	3:12
8.	"Clockwork" (featuring Lil Herb)	Coleman; Herbert Wright III; Lewis	Lex Luger	3:04
9.	"She Down for Me"	Coleman; Shibuya	DJ Kenn A.O.N	3:03
10.	"Ring Bells"	Coleman; Lewis	Lex Luger	3:08
11.	"Givin out Smoke" (featuring Gino Marley)	Coleman; Gino Marley; Cruz	Cruz	3:55
12.	"Traphouse"	Coleman; Pittman	Young Chop	2:21
13.	"I Don't No About Chu" (featuring Capo)	Coleman; Marvin Carr; Lindstrom	Murda Beatz	3:34
14.	"Third Floor" (featuring Peewee Longway)	Coleman; Quincy Williams; Youngblood	Tarentino	3:36
15.	"Bought a Big K" (featuring Chief Keef)	Coleman; Keith Cozart; Keron Richardson	Big K	3:52
16.	"Want a Nigga Dead" (featuring Gino Marley and SD)	Coleman; Marley; Sadiki Thirston; Youngblood	Tarentino	4:15
17.	"Spazz Out" (featuring SD)	Coleman; Thirston; Vince Carter; McKinley Leon	Carter; Dirty Vans	3:41
Total length:				56:57
