= Finally Rich =

Studio album by Chief Keef
- Released: December 18, 2012
- Recorded: January – December 2012
- Studios: Interscope Records, home studio
- Genres: Hip hop; drill; trap; gangsta rap
- Length: 45:14
- Labels: Interscope; Glory Boyz
- Producers: Rovaun Manuel (exec.); Larry Jackson (exec.); Young Chop (also exec.); A+; Casa Di; K.E. on the Track; Leek-E-Leek; Mike Will Made It; Nard & B; YGOnDaBeat; Young Ravisu

Chief Keef chronology
Back from the Dead (2012)	Finally Rich (2012)	Bang, Pt. 2 (2013)

Deluxe edition cover

Singles from Finally Rich
- 1. "3Hunna" Released: January 17, 2012; 2. "I Don't Like" Released: March 11, 2012; 3. "Love Sosa" Released: October 18, 2012; 4. "Hate Bein' Sober" Released: December 12, 2012; 5. "Laughin’ To The Bank" Released: December 14, 2012; 6. "Hallelujah" Released: January 16, 2013

Finally Rich is the debut studio album by American rapper Chief Keef. It was released on December 18, 2012 by Glory Boyz Entertainment and Interscope Records. The album features guest appearances from 50 Cent, Wiz Khalifa, Lil Reese, Rick Ross, Young Jeezy, Master P, French Montana, and Fat Trel, while the bulk of its production was handled by Keef's longtime collaborator Young Chop.

The album was supported by three singles: "I Don't Like", "Love Sosa" and "Hate Bein' Sober". Upon release, the album was met with generally mixed reviews from music critics and debuted at number 29 on the Billboard 200, with first-week sales of 50,000 copies in the United States.

In 2022, Rolling Stone named Finally Rich the 32nd greatest hip-hop album of all time.

== Background ==
Finally Rich was originally planned to be released as a mixtape but was later turned into a full-length album. The album was originally scheduled to be released on November 27, 2012, but it was pushed back until December 18, 2012.

== Singles ==
"I Don't Like" featuring Lil Reese, was released as the album's lead single on March 15, 2012. The song has peaked at number 73 on the US Billboard Hot 100, number 20 on the Hot R&B/Hip-Hop Songs, and number 15 on the Rap Songs charts. It also appeared on Chief Keef's mixtape Back from the Dead, which was released for free on March 12, 2012. The mixtape was later mastered and made available for purchase on iTunes. On May 1, 2012, rapper and producer Kanye West, made a remix featuring Pusha T, Big Sean and Jadakiss. The remix is featured as the final track on the West's G.O.O.D. Music compilation album, Cruel Summer.

"Love Sosa" was released as the album's second single on October 18, 2012. The song peaked at number 56 on the Billboard Hot 100, number 20 on the Hot R&B/Hip-Hop Songs, and number 17 on the Rap Songs charts. The music video for "Love Sosa" was released on October 18, 2012. It was later announced the song "Love Sosa" would be featured on the video game Grand Theft Auto V.

"Hate Bein' Sober" was released as the album's third single on December 13, 2012. The song features a guest appearances from fellow rappers 50 Cent and Wiz Khalifa. The song peaked on the US Billboard Heatseekers Songs at number 16.

=== Other songs ===
On January 18, 2012, the music video was released for the song 3Hunna. On September 21, 2012, the music video was released for the song "Ballin'". On November 10, 2012, the music video was released for the bonus track "Kobe". On August 15, 2013, the music video was released for "Citgo".

== Critical reception ==
Professional ratings
Aggregate scores
Source	Rating
AnyDecentMusic?	5.5/10
Metacritic	62/100
Review scores
Source	Rating
AllMusic	2.5/5 stars
Chicago Tribune	2/4 stars
The Guardian	3/5 stars
Los Angeles Times	2.5/4 stars
The Observer	3/5 stars
Pitchfork	7.5/10
Rolling Stone	3/5 stars
Spin	8/10
USA Today	2.5/4 stars
XXL	3/5

Finally Rich received mixed reviews from music critics. At Metacritic, which assigns a normalized rating out of 100 to reviews from mainstream critics, the album received an average score of 62, based on 17 reviews, which indicates "Generally favorable reviews". while "AnyDecentMusic?" assigns to the project an aggregate score of 55 out of 100. Randall Roberts of the Los Angeles Times gave the album two and a half stars out of four, saying "Landing a week before the big day, the 17-year-old Chicago thug offers infectious odes to nihilism and tirades against haters that are as simple-minded and catchy as they are brutal. Musically, however, the album shimmers with power, which makes the dozen songs feel even more dangerous". Greg Kot of the Chicago Tribune gave the album two stars out of four, saying "Finally Rich" owes plenty to the menacing inner-city narratives of Jeezy, Waka Flocka and Gucci Mane. Keef's innovation, if it can be called that, is to appear even colder than any of his predecessors, devoid of feelings, let alone guilt or remorse." Alex Macpherson of The Guardian gave the album three out of five stars, saying "Ha, ha, ha": 17-year-old Chicago drill rapper Chief Keef's syllables land like lead weights on concrete. Deliberately defining a song titled Laughin' to the Bank by its absence of any mirth is entirely in character for Keef, who wears his perpetual screwface like a badge of pride across Finally Rich and never once lets light in." Neil Martinez-Belkin of XXL gave the album an L, saying "“I Don't Like” still hasn't lost its appeal, and much of his debut carries the same level of replay value. So people will love it. People will hate it. Chief Keef probably doesn't care either way. He's 17, and he's finally rich."

Jesse Fairfax of HipHopDX gave the album three out of five stars, saying "A fair assessment can see his dangerous character as a product of his environment rather than simple glorification of wrongdoing, with Finally Rich creating entertainment out of hopelessness. Having taken off in a short time span while growing into adulthood, immaturity is certainly a big part of his shtick, but most importantly Keef's rise puts a mirror up to devastating socioeconomic conditions all too often swept under the rug." Jayson Greene of Pitchfork gave the album a 7.5 out of 10, saying "Finally Rich benefits from some professional tweaks in the mix, but otherwise leaves Keef's sound untouched. And in addition to succeeding on its own terms, it proves that Keef has a lot of potential—much more than his detractors might have hoped." Jesse Cataldo of Slant Magazine gave the album two stars out of five, saying "Keef's debut, Finally Rich, begins with a breathless tantrum that, with a slight change in subject matter, could reasonably be directed at a parent rather than the audience. This tone of manic, furious immaturity persists throughout, whether he's railing on "bitches" or "snitches" or detailing the outlines of boilerplate affluence to which he robotically aspires."

Jordan Sargent of Spin gave the album an eight out of ten, saying "He may forever be known as the kid whose videos depicted children waving handguns, but you wouldn't know it from his Interscope bow: He's no longer asking for that to be his calling card. Instead, as the torrent of controversy continues to swirl around him, Keef has written an album positioning him as one of rap's most rewarding pop stars." Anupa Mistry of Now gave the album two out of five stars, saying "Maybe the lasting value of Finally Rich won't be found in questioning its moral content (less a glorification of violence and poverty than a lament), but in parsing how we’ve reacted to it, and the differing socio-economic realities that make his music resonant for one demographic and a voyeuristic pleasure for another."

Mike Madden of Consequence of Sound gave the album two and a half stars out of four, saying "If there's one thing we’ve learned about Keef so far, it's that he's done a pretty good job putting his own spin on familiar sounds." Ryan Reed of Paste gave the album a five out of ten, saying "Keef has plenty of raw talent and compelling real-life drama to draw from, and with Young Chop, he's found one of hip-hop's most exciting new production talents." Nick Catucci of Rolling Stone gave the album three out of five stars, saying "Rapping with his affectless slur and bricklayer's tempo over rolling, mid-speed beats, Keef (who was criticized for mocking a murder victim, his rival, on Twitter) seems unshakably confident but profoundly directionless. The effect is mesmerizing, and a little scary."

David Jeffries of AllMusic gave the album two and a half stars out of five, saying "In the end, it's raw, irresponsible, unforgiving, and often infectious, but the controversial Finally Rich isn't a step forward on any counts. Consider this the guiltiest of pleasures, if considered at all." Kitty Empire of The Observer gave the album three out of five stars, saying "His major label debut, Finally Rich compiles a slew of his tracks that have done the rounds, with a handful of new songs. It's distressing, elementary and samey yet utterly unignorable."

=== Accolades ===
Spin ranked the album at number 14 on their list of the best 40 hip hop albums of 2013. Pitchfork ranked the bonus track "Citgo" at number 56 on their list of the top 100 tracks of 2013. They also ranked the album at number 82 on their list of the best 100 albums of 2010–14.

== Commercial performance ==
The album debuted at number 29 on the Billboard 200, with first-week sales of 50,000 copies in the United States. As of March 27, 2013, the album has sold 152,000 copies in the United States. On November 30, 2022, the album was certified platinum by the Recording Industry Association of America (RIAA) for sales in excess of 1,000,000 copies.

== Track listing ==
No.	Title	Writer(s)	Producer(s)	Length
1.	"Love Sosa"	Keith Cozart; Tyree Pittman	Young Chop	4:06
2.	"Hallelujah"	Cozart; Pittman	Young Chop	3:02
3.	"I Don't Like" (featuring Lil Reese)	Cozart; Tavares Taylor; Pittman	Young Chop	4:55
4.	"No Tomorrow"	Cozart; Michael Williams; Asheton "A+" Hogan	Mike Will Made It; A+ (co.)	3:10
5.	"Hate Bein' Sober" (featuring 50 Cent and Wiz Khalifa)	Cozart; Pittman; Curtis Jackson; Cameron Thomaz	Young Chop	4:40
6.	"Kay Kay"	Cozart; Kevin Erondu	K.E. on the Track	3:07
7.	"Laughin' to the Bank"	Cozart; Brandon "YGOnDaBeat" Sum	YGOnDaBeat	3:47
8.	"Diamonds" (featuring French Montana)	Cozart; Pittman; Karim Kharbouch	Young Chop	3:05
9.	"Ballin'"	Cozart; Kaliq "Leek E Leek" Lawrence	Leek E Leek	3:38
10.	"Understand Me" (featuring Young Jeezy)	Cozart; Carl "Casa Di" Dixon; Jay Jenkins	Casa Di	4:04
11.	"3Hunna" (Remix, featuring Rick Ross)	Cozart; Pittman; William Roberts II	Young Chop	3:29
12.	"Finally Rich"	Cozart; Pittman	Young Chop	4:08
Total length:				45:14

Deluxe edition (bonus tracks)
No.	Title	Writer(s)	Producer(s)	Length
13.	"Citgo"	Cozart; Radosław "Young Ravisu" Sobieraj	Young Ravisu	3:13
14.	"Kobe"	Cozart; Pittman	Young Chop	3:31
15.	"Got Them Bands"	Cozart; Sum	YGOnDaBeat	3:24
Total length:				55:24

iTunes Store bonus track
No.	Title	Producer(s)	Length
16.	"Don't Make No Sense" (featuring Master P and Fat Trel)	Lil Keis	4:18
Total length:			59:40

Best Buy deluxe edition bonus tracks
No.	Title	Writer(s)	Producer(s)	Length
17.	"Savage"	Cozart; Bernard Rosser; Brandon Rackley	Nard & B	3:02
18.	"Don't Know Dem"	Cozart; Pittman	Young Chop	4:00
Total length:				62:07

Notes

- Writing and production credits are according to the album booklet.

== Personnel ==
Credits for Finally Rich adapted from Allmusic.

- 50 Cent – featured artist
- A+ – producer
- Ray Alba – publicity
- Gretchen Anderson – producer
- Chris Bellman – mastering
- Nathalie Besharat – A&R
- Chris Cheney – engineer, mixing
- Chief Keef – primary artist
- Kevin "KD" Davis – mixing
- Casa Di – producer
- Kevin Erondu – producer
- Kevin "KE On The Track" Erondu – producer
- Jeff Forney – photography
- French Montana – featured artist
- Alicia Graham – A&R
- Stephanie Hsu – creation
- James Hunt – engineer
- Larry Jackson – executive producer
- Tiffany Johnson – marketing
- Leek E Leek – producer
- Lil' Reese – featured artist
- Rovaun P. Manuel – executive producer
- Justine Massa – creative coordinator
- Alex Ortiz – engineer
- Peeda Pan – management
- Will Ragland – art direction, design
- W. Roberts – composer
- Rick Ross – featured artist
- Daniel Shea – photography
- Mike Snodgress – marketing coordinator
- Mike Will Made It – producer
- Wiz Khalifa – featured artist
- Young Chop – engineer, executive producer, producer
- Young Jeezy – featured artist

== Charts ==
=== Weekly charts ===
Chart (2012)	Peak position
US Billboard 200	29
US Top R&B/Hip-Hop Albums (Billboard)	5
US Top Rap Albums (Billboard)	2

=== Year-end charts ===
Chart (2013)	Position
US Billboard 200	154
US Top R&B/Hip-Hop Albums (Billboard)	27

== Certifications ==
Region	Certification	Certified units/sales
Denmark (IFPI Danmark)	Gold	10,000^{‡}
United States (RIAA)	Platinum	1,000,000^{‡}
^{‡} Sales+streaming figures based on certification alone.
