= Supa Vultures =

EP by Lil Durk and Lil Reese
- Released: August 11, 2017
- Recorded: 2017
- Genre: Gangsta rap, trap
- Length: 19:13
- Label: Only the Family; Empire
- Producer: Chase Davis; Chopsquad DJ; Sonic; TyMadeIt

Lil Durk chronology
Love Songs for the Streets (2017)	Supa Vultures (2017)	Signed to the Streets 2.5 (2017)

Lil Reese chronology
The Savagery (2017)	Supa Vultures (2017)	GetBackGang (2018)

Supa Vultures is a collaborative EP by American rappers Lil Durk and Lil Reese. The EP was released on August 11, 2017. It contained no additional features, with all vocals being from the two. (Note: Lil Durk is the sole artist on track 6.)

== Background & release ==
The EP was recorded at Lil Durk's home studio in Atlanta.

The collaboration between the two was announced on July 27, 2017, along with the pre-release single "Distance", produced by Chopsquad DJ. The EP was released on August 11 of the same year.

== Critical reception ==
Supa Vultures received positive reviews from critics, with HotNewHipHop writing "this joint venture is the best work that both of the emcees have put out in some time". The track "Distance" is often seen as the best on the project. (Note: Attributed to multiple sources.)

== Commercial performance ==
Supa Vultures failed to chart on both the Billboard 200 and the Top Rap Albums charts, however it did peak at #10 and #57 on the Independent Albums chart and the Top Album Sales chart respectively.

== Tracklist ==
Adapted from Apple Music
No.	Title	Writer(s)	producer(s)	Length
1.	"Distance"	Durk Banks, Darrell Jackson, Tyree Pittman, Tavares Taylor	Chopsquad DJ	3:22
2.	"1500"	Banks; Eric Anthony Sandoval; Taylor	Chase Davis; Sonic	3:14
3.	"Unstoppable"	Banks; Jackson; Taylor	Chopsquad DJ	3:14
4.	"Fuck Dat Shit"	Banks; Jackson; Taylor	Chopsquad DJ	2:44
5.	"Alotta Lotta"		TyMadeIt	3:00
6.	"Nobody Knows"	Banks; Jackson	Chopsquad DJ	3:38
Total length:				19:13

=== Notes ===
- "Fuck Dat Shit" is titled "F**k Dat Shit" on Apple Music.

== Charts ==
Chart (2017)	Peak position
US Independent Albums (Billboard)	10
US Top Album Sales (Billboard)	57
