= Hate Bein' Sober =

2012 single by Chief Keef featuring 50 Cent and Wiz Khalifa

Single by Chief Keef featuring 50 Cent and Wiz Khalifa

from the album Finally Rich
- Released: December 12, 2012
- Recorded: 2012
- Length: 4:40
- Label: Glory Boyz Entertainment; Interscope
- Songwriters: Keith Cozart; Curtis Jackson; Cameron Thomaz; Tyree Pittman
- Producer: Young Chop

Chief Keef singles chronology
"Love Sosa" (2012)	"Hate Bein' Sober" (2012)	"Nobody" (2014)

50 Cent singles chronology
"My Life" (2012)	"Hate Bein' Sober" (2012)	"Major Distribution" (2013)

Wiz Khalifa singles chronology
"Die Young" (2012)	"Hate Bein' Sober" (2012)	"NBA" (2013)

"Hate Bein' Sober" is a song by American rapper Chief Keef featuring fellow American rappers 50 Cent and Wiz Khalifa. Written alongside producer and frequent collaborator Young Chop, it was released on December 12, 2012 as the third single from the former's debut studio album, Finally Rich. The song peaked on the Billboard Bubbling Under Hot 100 Singles at number nine.

== Controversy ==
On November 16, 2012, Chief Keef was a no-show to the set of the video in Las Vegas for the song leaving guests 50 Cent and Wiz Khalifa to shoot other videos instead.

On May 21, 2013, Katy Perry tweeted her dislike for the song. Keef responded with a series of tweets threatening Perry and hinted that he would release a diss track aimed at her. Shortly afterward, the two recording artists reconciled, and released a remix to "Legendary Lovers" in 2026; the song was sampled in Keef's 2014 single "Save Me".

50 Cent released the video for the single on April 29, 2020 via YouTube, sending out a tweet from his official Twitter account. The music video on YouTube has received over 20 million views as of April 2026.

== Charts ==
Chart (2012–2013)	Peak position
US Bubbling Under Hot 100 (Billboard)	9
US Hot R&B/Hip-Hop Songs (Billboard)	37

== Certifications ==
Certifications for "Hate Bein' Sober"
Region	Certification	Certified units/sales
New Zealand (RMNZ)	Platinum	30,000^{‡}
United Kingdom (BPI)	Silver	200,000^{‡}
United States (RIAA)	2× Platinum	2,000,000^{‡}
^{‡} Sales+streaming figures based on certification alone.
