= Georgetown (mixtape) =

Mixtape by Fat Trel
- Released: June 9, 2015
- Genre: Hip hop; trap
- Length: 56:43
- Label: Maybach Music Group; Slutty Boyz
- Producer: 808OnDaTrack; Bass Hedz; Beat Billionaire; Beat Mechanics; Cool & Dre; David D.A. Doman; Dree The Drummer; Go Grizzly; K.E. on the Track; Young Chop; Yung Lan

Fat Trel chronology
Gleesh (2014)	Georgetown (2015)	Muva Russia (2015)

Georgetown is a mixtape by American rapper Fat Trel. It was released on June 9, 2015, through Maybach Music Group and Slutty Boyz, and also released for digital download on LiveMixtapes for free. The mixtape features guest appearances from Wale, Rick Ross, Troy Ave, Boosa Da Shoota, Fetty Wap, and J Beale, while production on the mixtape was handled by Beat Billionaire, Cool & Dre, Young Chop, David D.A. Doman, K.E. on the Track, and Yung Lan, among others.

Georgetown serves as a follow-up to his previous 2014 mixtape Gleesh (2014). As of 2023, the mixtape was later re-released as a commercial mixtape exclusively on the streaming platforms (such as Apple Music, Spotify, Tidal, and Amazon Music) in its entirety.

== Track listing ==
Georgetown track listing
No.	Title	Producer(s)	Length
1.	"Intro"	Beat Billionaire	4:00
2.	"Wzup Wit Me"	808OnDaTrack	3:43
3.	"I'm Da Type"	Dree The Drummer	4:24
4.	"Brrrr" (featuring Wale and Rick Ross)	Cool & Dre	2:48
5.	"Fuck Out My Face"	Bass Hedz	3:45
6.	"Say My Name"	Bass Hedz	4:37
7.	"Funky Style" (featuring Troy Ave)	Go Grizzly	3:09
8.	"Geetchi Liberachi" (featuring Rick Ross)	Beat Billionaire	2:43
9.	"Young Niggaz"	Young Chop	2:02
10.	"IG Bitches"	Yung Lan	2:48
11.	"I'm Ill" (featuring Boosa Da Shoota)	Dree The Drummer	3:47
12.	"Calling All Workers"	K.E. on the Track; Beat Mechanics	2:12
13.	"Somebody Gotta Die"	Dree The Drummer	4:23
14.	"Murder Gardenz"	David D.A. Doman	3:23
15.	"I Think I Love Her" (featuring Fetty Wap)	Dree The Drummer	4:17
16.	"Dear Momma" (featuring J Beale)	David D.A. Doman	4:42
Total length:			56:43
