= To the World =

Song by Kanye West, R. Kelly, and Teyana Taylor

from the album Cruel Summer
- Released: September 14, 2012
- Genre: R&B
- Length: 3:51
- Label: GOOD; Def Jam
- Songwriters: Kanye West; Robert Kelly; Andrew Wansel; Warren Felder; Che Smith; Malik Jones
- Producers: Pop Wansel; Oakwud

"To the World" is song by American rapper Kanye West, with singers R. Kelly and Teyana Taylor from the GOOD Music compilation album, Cruel Summer (2012). West and Kelly sent an early track between each other, trusting each other's talents for the final result. The rapper calls out Mitt Romney for not releasing his tax returns.

== Background ==
R. Kelly revealed that he and West went back and forth with a track the rapper was working on, until the two "had something" and they trusted each other's talents. The singer had known West before he was famous and enjoyed time with him in environments like clubs, although they had never worked on a track in the studio before. R. Kelly was relieved the two found the chance, expressing honor in working with West. He had previously toured with West's frequent collaborator Jay-Z for their collaborative album The Best of Both Worlds (2002), although they experienced personal issues towards the end of the tour. However, both of the performers appeared on tracks for Cruel Summer. After R. Kelly's feature on "To the World", West later mentioned him on "Carnival", released with Ty Dolla Sign as ¥$ in February 2024.

On September 11, 2012, Cruel Summer sprang an internet leak that included a 40-second snippet of "To the World". Two days later, the track leaked in full. Musically, "To the World" is an R&B track. West references his hometown of Chicago with the line "Chi-Town til I'm on my back".

== Controversy ==
West insults 2012 United States Republican nominee Mitt Romney on "To the World", rapping about trying to protect his finances and then repeating twice that Romney does not "pay no [sic] tax". The lyrics reference Romney's refusal to publicly release his tax returns, which he had been pressured to do by the Democratic Party.

== Charts ==
Chart performance for "To the World"
Chart (2012)	Peak position
Canada Hot 100 (Billboard)	92
France (SNEP)	161
UK Singles (Official Charts)	94
UK Hip Hop/R&B (Official Charts)	17
US Billboard Hot 100	70
US Hot R&B/Hip-Hop Songs (Billboard)	35
US Hot Rap Songs (Billboard)	24
