= Cruel Summer (GOOD Music album) =

Compilation album by GOOD Music
- Released: September 14, 2012
- Recorded: 2011–2012
- Genre: Hip-hop
- Length: 54:31
- Labels: GOOD; Def Jam
- Producers: Kanye West; Andrew "Pop" Wansel; Anthony Kilhoffer; Boogz & Tapez; Dan Black; Hit-Boy; Hudson Mohawke; Illmind; Jeff Bhasker; Ken Lewis; Lifted; Mano; Mannie Fresh; Mike Dean; Oakwud; Tommy Brown; Travis Scott; The Twilite Tone; Young Chop

Kanye West chronology
Watch the Throne (2011)	Cruel Summer (2012)	Yeezus (2013)

Singles from Cruel Summer
- 1. "Mercy" Released: April 3, 2012; 2. "Cold" Released: April 17, 2012; 3. "New God Flow" Released: July 21, 2012; 4. "Clique" Released: September 6, 2012

Kanye West Presents: GOOD Music – Cruel Summer, commonly referred to simply as Cruel Summer, is a compilation album by recording artists of American record label GOOD Music, released on September 14, 2012, by the label itself and its parent company, Def Jam Recordings. GOOD Music's founder, American rapper Kanye West, first revealed plans for the label's collaborative album in October 2011. It was preceded by four singles—"Mercy", "Cold", "New God Flow", and "Clique"—that saw mixed success on the US Billboard Hot 100 chart.

The album features West himself, alongside the label's then-signees Pusha T, Big Sean, Teyana Taylor, Kid Cudi, John Legend, Common, D'banj and Malik Yusef, as well as affiliates Jay-Z, 2 Chainz, Travis Scott, and Cyhi the Prynce, among others. Production of Cruel Summer was primarily handled by members of GOOD Music's production wing, Very GOOD Beats, which included West, Hit-Boy, Hudson Mohawke, Travis Scott and Lifted, among others.

Cruel Summer received "a fairly lukewarm response" from critics, who commended its hubristic style and the tracks featuring West, but found it uneven as an album. It debuted at number two on the US Billboard 200, selling 205,000 copies in its first week. The album also reached the top 10 of charts in Australia, Canada, Switzerland, and the United Kingdom. As of November 4, 2012, Cruel Summer has sold 389,000 copies, according to Nielsen SoundScan. In 2021, the album was certified Platinum for over 1 million album-equivalent units by the RIAA.

A sequel to the album titled Cruel Winter began development sometime in 2016, and while a single for the album ("Champions") was released as promotion, the album was ultimately unfinished and never released. Plans to turn the album into a series of four albums were mentioned in an interview Complex held with Cyhi the Prince, where Cruel Autumn and Cruel Spring were mentioned, although those records never came into fruition. As of 2026, none of the artists featured on the album are still with the label.

== Background and recording ==
Kanye West founded the GOOD Music label in 2004. Since the label's inception, multiple acts have been signed to the label, including close collaborators of West such as Kid Cudi, Common, John Legend, Pusha T, Big Sean and Travis Scott. West first announced plans for a GOOD Music album in October 2011 via his Twitter account. Later on May 23, 2012, the title was revealed in part with a film, Cruel Summer, written by Elon Rutberg and produced by Alex Rosenberg, which debuted at the Cannes Film Festival. The album was originally slated for release on August 7, 2012, but underwent several delays.

Pusha T said that he recorded over 20 verses for the album, and a song with Big Sean and Common called "Trash Bags" that was ultimately scrapped. American rapper Azealia Banks also said that she recorded with West earlier in 2012, but her contributions were not included on the album.

== Release ==
Cruel Summer was made available to pre-order on the website of the Japanese branch of retail chain HMV on September 1, 2012, revealing the album's track listing as well as each track's respective performers. The album's artwork was designed by DONDA, West's creative agency.

== Singles ==
"Mercy", a collaboration between Kanye West, Big Sean, Pusha T and 2 Chainz, was released as the album's lead single on April 3, 2012. The track was premiered by Funkmaster Flex's Hot 97 radio show and was released onto the Internet the following day onto West's official website. The release of the track continued West's GOOD Fridays, a music giveaway that provided free MP3 downloads every week, which had been on hiatus since December 2010. The song peaked at number 13 on the US Billboard Hot 100 and topped the Billboard Hot R&B/Hip-Hop Songs and Hot Rap Songs charts.

"Cold", featuring DJ Khaled, was released as the album's second single. The track was then released as a single onto iTunes on April 17, 2012. Following its digital release, the song impacted urban contemporary radio on May 8, 2012. The single peaked at numbers 89 and 69 respectively on the Billboard Hot 100 and Hot R&B/Hip-Hop Songs singles charts.

"New God Flow", a collaboration between Pusha T and Kanye West, was released onto iTunes as the album's third single on July 21, 2012. It first premiered at the 2012 BET Awards on July 2, 2012, with West performing an a cappella version of his verse. The song peaked at number 89 on the Billboard Hot 100. "Clique", a collaboration between Kanye West, Jay-Z and Big Sean, was released as the album's fourth single on September 7, 2012. The single peaked at numbers 12 and 2 respectively on the Billboard Hot 100 and Hot R&B/Hip-Hop Songs singles charts.

== Critical reception ==
Professional ratings
Aggregate scores
Source	Rating
AnyDecentMusic?	6.2/10
Metacritic	68/100
Review scores
Source	Rating
AllMusic	4/5 stars
The A.V. Club	C+
The Guardian	4/5 stars
The Independent	3/5 stars
The Irish Times	3/5 stars
MSN Music (Expert Witness)	B+
NME	7/10
Pitchfork	6.5/10
Rolling Stone	3/5 stars
Spin	6/10

Cruel Summer received "a fairly lukewarm response" from critics. According to the review aggregator Metacritic, Cruel Summer received "generally favorable reviews" based on a weighted average score of 68 out of 100 from 28 critic scores. Christopher R. Weingarten of Spin felt that it is "not a cohesive crew album" and called it "a runway show of small, costly, uncomfortable missteps." Nathan Rabin, writing in The A.V. Club, said that it "feels like an unusually crowded solo album, but West’s affiliates don’t share his gift for fusing self-aggrandizement with soul-searching reflection." Slant Magazine's Ted Scheinman observed no "concept or production value to hold" the album, which he felt "isn't a Kanye album per se, but even as a high-pedigree compilation, it still falls flat."

Jon Caramanica of The New York Times complimented the album's four singles for "show[ing] [West] at or near his best", but found GOOD Music's other rappers to be "a mixed bag". Jonah Weiner of Rolling Stone called the album "occasionally exhilarating, ultimately underwhelming", and observed "no grand statements, but plenty of hot lines", with West as "the star ... who bum-rushes every song he's on like it's someone else's acceptance speech". The magazine later named it the 24th best record of 2012 in a year-end list.

Adam Fleischer from XXL felt the songs featuring West were Cruel Summer's highlights. Andy Gill of The Independent viewed it as less "ambitious" than West's own albums and said the songs "may lack grandeur, but they bring a sinister, stalking ambience that matches the blend of money, mystery and menace in the contributions of collaborators". Paul MacInnes of The Guardian wrote that his "penchant for superabundance is one of the most exhilirating [sic] things in pop music." Priya Elan of NME felt that the album is "essential" as "a cross section of the most brilliant, solipsistic mind in rap". MSN Music critic Robert Christgau was less enthusiastic and said the rapping is clever but plagued by a "Conspicuous Consumption Equals Authentic Negritude" philosophy, although he was impressed by the music: "The surprise is that the attention requires so little effort, because there's always a musical touch to keep you alert". The album received nominations for World's Best Album at the 2014 World Music Awards and Best Group Album at the 2012 XXL Awards

== Commercial performance ==
The album debuted at number two on the US Billboard 200, selling 205,000 copies in its first week. It also entered at number one on the Billboard Top R&B/Hip-Hop Albums. In its second week the album dropped to seventh, selling 55,000.

Cruel Summer debuted at number four on the Canadian Albums Chart, with first-week sales of 12,000 copies in Canada. As of November 4, 2012, Cruel Summer has sold 389,000 copies, according to Nielsen SoundScan.

As of 2020, Cruel Summer is tied with Shady XV as the second-best performing record label compilation album on Billboards year-end Compilation albums chart, behind Eminem Presents: The Re-Up (3) in 2007, since records began in 2006.

== Track listing ==
No.	Title	Writer(s)	Producer(s)	Length
1.	"To the World" (performed by Kanye West, R. Kelly and Teyana Taylor)	Kanye West; Robert Kelly; Teyana Taylor; Andrew Wansel; Warren Felder; Che Smith; Malik Jones	Pop Wansel; Oakwud; West^{[a]}; Hudson Mohawke^{[b]}; Ken Lewis^{[b]}; Mano^{[b]}; Travis Scott^{[b]}; Anthony Kilhoffer^{[b]}	3:51
2.	"Clique" (performed by Kanye West, Jay-Z and Big Sean)	West; Shawn Carter; Sean Anderson; Chauncey Hollis; James Fauntleroy	Hit-Boy; West^{[a]}; Kilhoffer^{[b]}; Noah Goldstein^{[b]}	4:53
3.	"Mercy.1" (performed by Kanye West, Big Sean, Pusha T, and 2 Chainz)	West; Anderson; Terrence Thornton; Tauheed Epps; Stephan Taft; Mike Dean; Anthony Khan; James Thomas; Denzie Beagle; Winston Riley; Reggie Williams	Lifted; West^{[b]}	5:26
4.	"New God Flow.1" (performed by Kanye West, Pusha T and Ghostface Killah)	West; Thornton; Dennis Coles; Herb Rooney; Ronald Bean; Highleigh Crizoe; Rev. G.I. Townsend; Marcos Valle	West; Boogz & Tapez^{[a]}; Kilhoffer^{[b]}	5:57
5.	"The Morning" (performed by Raekwon, Pusha T, Common, 2 Chainz, Cyhi the Prynce, Kid Cudi, and D'banj)	Corey Woods; Thornton; Lonnie Lynn; Epps; Cydel Young; Scott Mescudi; West; Ramon Ibanga; Jeff Bhasker; Jacques Webster; Andrea Martin; Alan Lerner; Frederick Loewe	West; !llmind; Bhasker^{[a]}; Travis Scott^{[a]}	4:35
6.	"Cold.1" (performed by Kanye West and DJ Khaled)	West; Hollis; James Smith; Marlon Williams	Hit-Boy	3:36
7.	"Higher" (performed by The-Dream, Pusha T, Mase, and Cocaine 80s)	Terius Nash; Thornton; Mason Betha; Fauntleroy; Hollis; West	Hit-Boy; West^{[a]}; Mike Dean^{[b]}	4:34
8.	"Sin City" (performed by John Legend, Teyana Taylor, Cyhi the Prynce, and Malik Yusef)	John Stephens; Webster; Taylor; C. Young; Jones; Tommy Brown; Joseph Young; Victoria McCants	Brown; Travis Scott	4:28
9.	"The One" (performed by Kanye West, Big Sean, 2 Chainz, and Marsha Ambrosius)	West; Anderson; Epps; Marsha Ambrosius; Byron Thomas; Jones; Fauntleroy; C. Smith; Carlton Ridenhour; James Boxley; Dave Barker; Winston Riley; Ansell Collins	West; Hudson Mohawke^{[a]}; The Twilite Tone^{[a]}; Kilhoffer^{[a]}; Mannie Fresh^{[b]}; Lifted^{[b]}	5:44
10.	"Creepers" (performed by Kid Cudi)	Mescudi; Dan Black	Black	3:14
11.	"Bliss" (performed by John Legend and Teyana Taylor)	Stephens; Taylor; Ross Birchard; Erika Hamilton	Hudson Mohawke	3:30
12.	"Don't Like.1" (performed by Kanye West, Chief Keef, Pusha T, Big Sean, and Jadakiss)	West; Keith Cozart; Thornton; Anderson; Jason Phillips; Tyree Pittman; Townsend; Barrington Levy; Paul Love	Young Chop; West^{[a]}; The Twilite Tone^{[b]}; Goldstein^{[b]}	4:43
Total length:				54:31

Notes

- Track listing and credits from album booklet
- ^{^a} signifies a co-producer.
- ^{^b} signifies an additional producer.
- "Clique" features background vocals by Cocaine 80s, Aude Cardona, and Travis Jones.
- "The Morning" features additional vocals by Andrea Martin.
- "Cold.1" features outro vocals by DJ Pharris.
- "Higher" features background vocals by John Legend and 2 Chainz.
- "Sin City" features additional vocals by Travis Scott and Cocaine 80s.
- "Don't Like.1" features additional vocals by Noah Goldstein.

Sample credits

- "Mercy.1" contains samples of the recording, "Dust a Sound Boy", written by Denzie Beagle and Winston Riley, as performed by Super Beagle; contains samples of the recording, "Cu-Oonuh", written by Reggie Williams and Winston Riley, as performed by Reggie Stepper; contains portions of the recording, "Lambo", as performed by YB; and contains a sample of "Tony's Theme", composed by Giorgio Moroder.
- "New God Flow.1" contains samples of the recording, "Synthetic Substitution", written by Herb Rooney, as performed by Melvin Bliss; contains samples of the recording, "Mighty Healthy", written by Herb Rooney, Ronald Bean, Highleigh Crizoe, and Dennis Coles, as performed by Ghostface Killah; contains a sample of the Reverend G.I. Townsend recording, "Sermon Fragment", written and performed by Townsend; and contains samples from the recording, "Bôdas De Sangue", written and performed by Marcos Valle.
- "The Morning" contains portions of "Get Me to the Church on Time", written and performed by Alan Jay Lerner and Frederick Loewe.
- "Cold.1" contains interpolations of "Illegal Search", written by James Smith and Marlon Williams, as performed by LL Cool J; and contains a sample of "Lookin' at Me" as performed by Mase.
- "The One" contains samples of the recording, "Public Enemy No. 1", written by Carlton Ridenhour and James Boxley, as performed by Public Enemy; and contains samples of the recording, "Double Barrel", written by Dave Barker, Winston Riley, and Ansell George Collins, as performed by Dave and Ansell Collins.
- "Don't Like.1" contains elements of "Under Mi Sensi", written and performed by Barrington Levy and Paul Love.

== Personnel ==
Credits for Cruel Summer adapted from AllMusic.

- 2 Chainz – primary artist
- Virgil Abloh – creative director
- Marsha Ambrosius – primary artist, vocals
- Chris Atlas – marketing
- Craig Balmoris – producer
- Daniel Betancourt – engineer
- Big Sean – primary artist
- Dan Black – producer
- Tommy Brown – producer
- Mano – producer
- Don C. – A&R
- Guido Callarelli – art direction
- Jim Caruana – assistant, engineer
- Chief Keef – primary artist
- Common – primary artist
- D'Banj – primary artist
- Mike Dean – additional production, keyboards, mixing
- DJ Khaled – primary artist
- DJ Pharris – vocals
- The-Dream – primary artist
- James Fauntleroy II – vocals
- Mannie Fresh – producer
- Ghostface Killah – primary artist
- Noah Goldstein – engineer, keyboards, mastering, mixing, vocals
- Hit-Boy – producer
- Hudson Mohawke – musician, producer
- Jadakiss – primary artist
- Jay-Z – primary artist
- Doug Joswick – package production
- R. Kelly – engineer, primary artist
- Kid Cudi – primary artist
- Anthony Kilhoffer – additional production, engineer, keyboards, mastering, mixing, musician, producer, sound effects
- Rob Kinelski – engineer
- John Legend – background vocals, primary artist
- Ken Lewis – additional production, engineer
- Andrea Martin – vocals
- Mase – primary artist
- Ian Mereness – engineer
- Fabien Montique – photography
- Julian Nixon – producer
- Oakwud – producer
- Keith Parry – mixing assistant
- Richard Parry – assistant
- Joe Perez – graphic design
- Che Pope – A&R, executive producer, programming
- Cyhi da Prynce – primary artist
- Pusha T – primary artist
- Raekwon – primary artist
- Patrick "Plain Pat" Reynolds – A&R
- Montez Roberts – engineer
- Todd Russell – art producer
- Bart Schoudel – engineer
- Travi$ Scott – primary artist, producer
- Nael Shehade – engineer
- Rob Suchecki – assistant
- Bill Sullivan – engineer
- Teyana Taylor – primary artist
- Scott Townsend – art producer
- Twilite Tone – additional production, producer
- Anna Ugarte – assistant
- Andrew "Pop" Wansel – producer
- Kanye West – additional production, creative director, executive producer, primary artist, producer
- Kristen Yiengst – art producer
- Young Chop – producer
- Malik Yusef – primary artist
- Izvor Zivkovic – management
- Luis Tarin – photography

== Charts ==
=== Weekly charts ===
Chart (2012)	Peak position
Australian Albums (ARIA)	7
Belgian Albums (Ultratop Flanders)	55
Belgian Albums (Ultratop Wallonia)	125
Canadian Albums (Billboard)	4
Danish Albums (Hitlisten)	12
Dutch Albums (Album Top 100)	69
Dutch Compilation Albums (Compilation Top 30)	10
French Albums (SNEP)	30
Norwegian Albums (VG-lista)	18
Swiss Compilation Albums (Swiss Hitparade)	10
UK Album Downloads Chart (OCC)	4
UK Compilation Chart (OCC)	2
US Billboard 200	2
US Compilation Albums (Billboard)	1
US Top R&B/Hip-Hop Albums (Billboard)	1

=== Year-end charts ===
Chart (2012)	Position
Australian Urban Albums (ARIA)	35
UK Compilation Chart (OCC)	71
US Billboard 200	79
US Compilation Albums (Billboard)	5
US Top R&B/Hip-Hop Albums (Billboard)	15

Chart (2013)	Position
US Compilation Albums (Billboard)	15
US Top R&B/Hip-Hop Albums (Billboard)	54

== Certifications ==
Certifications for Cruel Summer
Region	Certification	Certified units/sales
United States (RIAA)	Platinum	1,000,000^{‡}
^{‡} Sales+streaming figures based on certification alone.

== Release history ==
List of release date, showing country, and record label
Region	Date	Label
Ireland	September 14, 2012	GOOD Music; Def Jam
New Zealand	September 14, 2012	GOOD Music; Def Jam
Denmark	September 14, 2012	GOOD Music; Def Jam
United Kingdom	September 17, 2012	GOOD Music; Def Jam
United States	September 18, 2012	GOOD Music; Def Jam
