= I Don't Like =

2012 single by Chief Keef

Single by Chief Keef featuring Lil Reese

from the album Back from the Dead and Finally Rich
- Released: March 6, 2012
- Genre: Drill; trap
- Length: 4:27 (single version); 4:53 (album version)
- Label: Glory Boyz; Interscope
- Songwriters: Keith Cozart; Tavares Taylor; Tyree Pittman; Kalvin DeSousa
- Producer: Young Chop

Chief Keef singles chronology
"I Don't Know Dem" (2012)	"I Don't Like" (2012)	"Love Sosa" (2012)

Music video
- "I Don't Like" on YouTube

"I Don't Like" is the debut single by American rapper Chief Keef featuring fellow American rapper Lil Reese. Produced by Young Chop, it was released on March 6, 2012. The song was later remixed for the G.O.O.D. Music compilation album Cruel Summer.

"I Don't Like" was originally released on Chief Keef's third mixtape Back from the Dead on March 6, 2012. The song became available on iTunes on July 24, 2012, when Back from the Dead was officially released to digital platforms. The music video was directed by DGainz, and was uploaded to his official YouTube channel on March 11, 2012.

"I Don't Like" entered and peaked at number 73 on the US Billboard Hot 100. Elsewhere in the US, "I Don't Like" peaked at number 20 on the Hot R&B/Hip-Hop Songs and number 15 on the Rap Songs chart. Complex named the song #7 on their list of the best 50 songs of 2012. In 2019, Pitchfork named "I Don't Like" the 13th best song of the 2010s.

== Track listing ==
Digital single

No.	Title	Writer(s)	Producer(s)	Length
1.	"I Don't Like (feat. Lil Reese)"	Keith Cozart; Tavares Taylor; Tyree Pittman; Kalvin DeSousa	Young Chop	4:55

== Charts ==
Chart (2012)	Peak position
US Billboard Hot 100	73
US Hot R&B/Hip-Hop Songs (Billboard)	20
US Hot Rap Songs (Billboard)	15

=== Year-end charts ===
Chart (2012)	Peak Position
US Hot R&B/Hip-Hop Songs (Billboard)	96

== Certifications ==
Region	Certification	Certified units/sales
New Zealand (RMNZ)	Gold	15,000^{‡}
United Kingdom (BPI)	Silver	200,000^{‡}
United States (RIAA)	2× Platinum	2,000,000^{‡}
^{‡} Sales+streaming figures based on certification alone.

== GOOD Music remix ==
"I Don't Like (Remix)"

Song by Kanye West, Chief Keef, Pusha T, Big Sean and Jadakiss

from the album Cruel Summer
- Released: May 1, 2012
- Genre: Hip hop
- Length: 4:44
- Label: GOOD Music; Def Jam
- Songwriters: Kanye West; Keith Cozart; Terrence Thornton; Sean Anderson; Jason Phillips
- Producers: Young Chop; Kanye West; the Twilite Tone; Noah Goldstein; Mike Will Made It (uncredited)

A remix featuring Pusha T, Kanye West, Big Sean, and Jadakiss was released on the G.O.O.D. Music compilation album Cruel Summer as "Don't Like.1". Chief Keef was under house arrest when the remix was recorded.

Young Chop, the song's original producer, threatened to sue West over the remix. The matter was resolved in the same year, although West's artist, Pusha T, would diss Young Chop on a separate record.

=== Charts ===
Chart (2012)	Peak position
US R&B/Hip-Hop Digital Song Sales (Billboard)	8
US Rap Digital Song Sales (Billboard)	8

=== Certifications ===
Region	Certification	Certified units/sales
United States (RIAA)	Platinum	1,000,000^{‡}
^{‡} Sales+streaming figures based on certification alone.
