= Gleesh =

Mixtape by Fat Trel
- Released: April 1, 2014
- Genres: Hip hop; trap
- Labels: Maybach Music Group; Slutty Boyz
- Producers: All Star; Bass Hedz; Boss Major; Butla Beatz; DJ Tree Gotti; Famous; Harry Fraud; Izze The Producer; No Credit; Rozart; Sloan; Young Chop

Fat Trel chronology
SDMG (2013)	Gleesh (2014)	Georgetown (2015)

Singles from Gleesh
- 1. "She Fell In Love" Released: December 10, 2013

Gleesh is a mixtape by American rapper Fat Trel released on April 1, 2014 by Maybach Music Group. A previously released single, "She Fell In Love" was included in the release.

== Release and promotion ==
"She Fell In Love", released as a single five months earlier, was included on the mixtape and would be its only single.

A music video for "She Fell In Love" was released a month before the mixtape itself. A video for "Rich As Fuck" was released two weeks after the mixtape, a video for "Walkin Thru My Hood" was released in October, a video for "Rest In Peace" was released the following January, and a video for "What We Doing" was released in March, a year after the first video.

The song "Fresh" contains samples from "Dirty Ol' Man" by The Three Degrees.

== Critical reception ==
Gleesh received mixed reviews from music critics. BET's Jake Rohn praised the final track ("a rare showing of his raw and emotional side") but concluded that "much of the tape is simply another good effort for him". XXL's Max Goldberg wrote that "he doesn’t stray far from his comfort zone ... his lyrics aren’t mind blowing and the topics don’t vary much" but while "the mixtape definitely lags in some places" it's "as enjoyable as its cover is funny".

== Controversy ==
The cover artwork was replaced two weeks after the mixtape was released. The original artwork featured publicity photos for the television series Glee photoshopped to make the actresses appear to be covered in cum. Fat Trel was unapologetic but within days of receiving complaints the cover was replaced with a red monochrome print of his own face.

== Track listing ==
No.	Title	Producer(s)	Length
1.	"Datz Kool"	Boss Major	3:21
2.	"How U Feel"	Harry Fraud	4:04
3.	"Walkin Thru My Hood"	Butla Beats	3:57
4.	"Rich As Fuck"	All Star	3:05
5.	"Shoot (Remix)" (featuring Rick Ross)	Young Chop	3:22
6.	"In My Bag" (featuring Wale)	No Credit	4:09
7.	"Fresh" (featuring Rockie Fresh)	Sloan; Rozart	5:02
8.	"Buku Chips"	DJ Tree Gotti	3:41
9.	"Treez & Liquor" (featuring Rich Hil)	All Star	3:35
10.	"She Fell In Love"	Izze The Producer	3:40
11.	"Gotti 4 Real"	DJ Tree Gotti	3:56
12.	"Thot Street" (featuring Stalley)	Sloan	3:46
13.	"Real" (featuring P-Wild and Boosa Da Shoota)	Bass Hedz	5:13
14.	"What We Doing" (featuring Tracy T)	Famous	3:57
15.	"Rest In Peace"	All Star	4:23
Total length:			56:31
