= Double Barrel (song) =

Single by Dave and Ansil Collins

from the album Double Barrel
- B-side: "Double Barrel (Version 2)" (Techniques), "Double Barrel (Instrumental)" (Big Tree)
- Released: August 1970 (UK), May 1971 (US)
- Genre: Reggae; pop
- Length: 2:44
- Label: Techniques, Big Tree =
- Producer: Winston Riley

Dave and Ansil Collins singles chronology
"Double Barrel" (1970)	"Monkey Spanner" (1971)

Music video
- Dave & Ansel Collins - Double Barrel (Official Audio) on YouTube

"Double Barrel" is a 1970 reggae single by Dave and Ansell Collins (though credited in both the UK and the US to 'Dave and Ansil Collins').

The song was written and produced by Winston Riley, former vocalist of The Techniques. It was a sequel to the single "Shocks of a Mighty" in which Ansell Collins played the Hammond organ while Dave Barker vocalised grunts and exclamations with a boxing theme. None of the title appears in the lyrics.

The vocals were then developed for the Double Barrel song which was recorded in one take. Barker was encouraged to think big and James Bond was suggested as a model by Riley's brother Buster. 007 was the inspiration for the catchphrase "I am the magnificent double-U, oh, oh, oh".

This song was the first appearance on record by Sly Dunbar, later of Sly & Robbie, on drums. He was just 18 at the time.

A significant portion of the tune bears a strong resemblance to Ramsey Lewis' 1967 song "Party Time" (on Chess).

== Charts ==
It was the second reggae tune to top the UK singles chart, two years after Desmond Dekker's number 1 breakthrough hit "Israelites". The record reached number 1 in the UK for the first two weeks in May 1971, selling 300,000 copies, after only 33 radio plays. The record also reached number 1 in Mexico on October 23, 1971 and number 8 in Australia.

In the US, "Double Barrel" peaked at number 22 on the Billboard Hot 100 the week of 7 August 1971 and number 4 on WLS on 28 June 1971, two years to the week after "Israelites" made a nearly identical climb to peak at the same position on the same chart.

Chart (1970–71)	Peak position
Australia (Kent Music Report)	8
Belgium (Ultratop 50 Flanders)	4
Belgium (Ultratop 50 Wallonia)	42
Canada Top Singles (RPM)	41
Germany (GfK)	28
Ireland (IRMA)	10
Mexico (Radio Mil)	1
Netherlands (Dutch Top 40)	1
Netherlands (Single Top 100)	1
UK Singles (Official Charts)	1
US Billboard Hot 100	22

== Cover versions ==
- The song has been covered by later ska acts such as The Selecter and The Specials. In 1972, a sample of the song was included in the top ten hit "Convention '72" by The Delegates.

== Samples ==
It was sampled in 2012 GOOD Music song "The One". The opening theme of the French YouTuber Joueur du Grenier, composed by Yannick Crémer, is inspired by the musical style and melodic structure of this song.

== See also ==
- List of number-one hits of 1971 (Mexico)
