= Dave Barker =

- Born: David Crooks; 29 October 1947 (age 78); Franklyn Town, Kingston, Jamaica
- Genres: Reggae, soul
- Instrument: Vocalist

Dave Barker (born David Crooks; 29 October 1947, Franklyn Town, Kingston, Jamaica) is a reggae and rocksteady singer and songwriter who has made a string of solo albums along with recordings as a member of the Techniques and as half of the duo Dave and Ansell Collins.

== Biography ==
Crooks was born in 1947 and raised by his grandmother and three uncles from the age of 4 after his mother emigrated to England in 1952 (his father emigrated to the United States before he was born). He began singing as a teenager, inspired by James Brown and Otis Redding, whom he heard on American radio stations.

His first group was the Two Tones, formed with friends Brenton Matthews and Fathead, who recorded unsuccessfully for Duke Reid. Barker had a brief stint in Winston Riley's Techniques, singing alongside Riley and Bruce Ruffin, and formed a duo with Glen Brown as the duo Glen and Dave, recording for both Harry J and Coxsone Dodd, while also working in the pressing plant at Studio One. Brown introduced Crooks to Lee "Scratch" Perry, suggesting that Perry get Crooks to voice a track at a recording session. The resulting track was "Prisoner of Love", and led to Crooks becoming a regular vocalist for Perry, who decided Crooks should record as Dave Barker, and encouraged American-style deejay vocals in addition to Barker's usual high tenor singing. Barker had hit singles with "Shocks of a Mighty" and "Spinning Wheel" (with Melanie Jonas), followed in 1970 by his debut album Prisoner of Love. Working with Perry at the same time as the Wailers, Barker toasted over the latter's "Small Axe" for 1971's "Shocks 71". March 1971 brought international fame as part of a duo with Ansell Collins. "Double Barrel" was a number 1 hit in the United Kingdom, and was also the first recording on which drummer Sly Dunbar played. "Double Barrel" was followed in June of the same year with a number 7 UK hit in the form of "Monkey Spanner". The duo failed to sustain success in the UK, and Collins returned to Jamaica, with Barker settling in England and embarking once again on a solo career, releasing 1976's In the Ghetto, which while credited to Dave and Ansell Collins, was a solo effort. He then joined vocal group Chain Reaction along with Bruce Ruffin and Bobby Davis, targeting the soul market, but without great success. Barker has continued to record, including a live album featuring Barker playing with the Selecter.

In 2005, Barker performed a couple of tracks with UK ska/reggae band the Riffs at Club Ska in London. A version of "Double Barrel" (recorded with the Riffs) was released on The Riffs - Live at Club Ska album the following year on Moon Ska Records.

He appeared as a guest on the Radcliffe & Maconie BBC Radio 6 Music show on 20 August 2012, talking extensively about the music he was influenced by and the music he had created alongside Ansell and about Jamaica's independence.

== Discography ==
=== Albums ===
- Prisoner of Love (1970), Trojan (Dave Barker meets the Upsetters)
- Double Barrel (1971), Big Tree/Techniques (Dave & Ansell Collins), also issued on RAS with different track listing
- In the Ghetto (1976), Trojan
- Roadblock (1979), Bushranger
- Never Lose Never Win (1976), Gull (Chain Reaction)
- Change of Action (1983), Vista
- Chase a Miracle (1983), Vista
- Classics (1991), Techniques (the Techniques)
- Monkey Spanner (1997), Trojan
- Dave and Ansel Collins (2001), Armoury (Dave & Ansell Collins)
- Kingston Affair (2002), Moon Ska (Dave Barker & the Selecter)
