= Love Sosa =

2012 single by Chief Keef

Single by Chief Keef

from the album Finally Rich
- Released: October 18, 2012
- Recorded: 2012
- Genre: Drill
- Length: 3:23
- Label: Glory Boyz; Interscope
- Songwriters: Keith Cozart; Tyree Pittman
- Producer: Young Chop

Chief Keef singles chronology
"I Don't Like" (2012)	"Love Sosa" (2012)	"Hate Bein' Sober" (2013)

Music video
- "Love Sosa" on YouTube

"Love Sosa" is the second single by rapper Chief Keef from his debut studio album Finally Rich (2012). It was released on October 18, 2012. The song was produced by Young Chop, and was written by him alongside Chief Keef. The track is often regarded as Keef's signature song.

The accompanying music video was directed by Duan Gaines, more commonly known as DGainz. The film features Chief Keef and his collective performing in front of the camera while inside a house. The music video was released on October 18, 2012, the same day the single was released.

Rolling Stone stated that the song "shook the foundation of hip hop".

== Release ==
A 0:35 part of the song had been leaked to the internet unfinished in September 2012 on multiple websites such as Twitter and YouTube. About a week later, it was leaked in full version. The song was released through iTunes a few weeks later.

== Music video ==
The music video, directed by DGainz, was shot and released on October 18, 2012. It was shot in the same spot as the video for Keef's first single "I Don't Like". The video was shot on the South Side of Chicago. The video has amassed 400 million views on YouTube as of November 2026.

== Remix ==
Although the song's producer Young Chop stated in December 2012 that Drake and French Montana may appear on another version of the song, the remix was never released. On January 16, 2013, MMG artists Rick Ross and Stalley released a freestyle over the instrumental of "Love Sosa".

== Reception ==
The Magazine Complex ranked the song number 20 on their list of the 50 best songs of 2012. Rapper Drake praised the song on Twitter, saying he played it 130 times in three days. Chief Keef announced "Love Sosa" would be featured on one of the in-game radio stations within the 2013 game Grand Theft Auto V, however this would turn out to be false.

In 2026, the United States Department of Defense used Chief Keef's "Love Sosa" as background music in a video ad.

== Charts ==
=== Weekly charts ===
Weekly chart performance for "Love Sosa"
Chart (2012–2013)	Peak position
US Billboard Hot 100	56
US Hot R&B/Hip-Hop Songs (Billboard)	16

=== Year-end charts ===
Year-end chart performance for "Love Sosa"
Chart (2013)	Position
US Hot R&B/Hip-Hop Songs (Billboard)	64

== Certifications ==
Certifications for "Love Sosa"
Region	Certification	Certified units/sales
Denmark (IFPI Danmark)	Gold	45,000^{‡}
Italy (FIMI)	Gold	50,000^{‡}
New Zealand (RMNZ)	Platinum	30,000^{‡}
United Kingdom (BPI)	Gold	400,000^{‡}
United States (RIAA)	5× Platinum	5,000,000^{‡}
^{‡} Sales+streaming figures based on certification alone.
