= Lil Reese =

American rapper (born 1993)

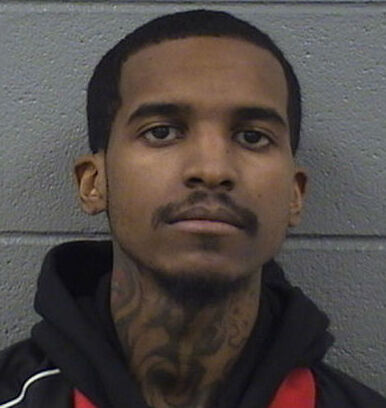
- Lil Reese's mugshot in 2016

Background information
- Also known as: Reese Money; Grim Reaper
- Born: Tavares Lamont Taylor; January 6, 1993 (age 33); Chicago, Illinois, U.S.
- Genres: Midwestern hip-hop; drill
- Occupations: Rapper; songwriter
- Years active: 2010–present
- Labels: Kyyba; 300 Entertainment; Warner

Tavares Lamont Taylor (born January 6, 1993), known professionally as Lil Reese, is an American rapper. Hailing from the drill music scene, he is best known for his guest appearance on Chief Keef's 2012 single "I Don't Like", which peaked at number 73 on the Billboard Hot 100. His debut mixtape, Don't Like (2012), was followed by three extended plays, including the collaborative project with Lil Durk, Supa Vultures (2017).

Taylor was convicted of aggravated assault after he was found guilty of strangling his girlfriend in March 2022. In October 2024, he was sentenced to five years in prison. He is currently incarcerated at Garza West Unit in Texas; he is set for release in February 2029 and will be eligible for parole in 2026.

== Early life ==
Taylor was raised in the Englewood neighborhood on the South Side of Chicago to a large family. During his formative years growing up in a notorious 16-story high-rise housing project called the "Calumet Buildings", he became affiliated with the Black Disciples gang as early as age five, becoming a member by his preteens after relocating to "64th and Normal" in Englewood, where he became close friends with gang member Lil Durk.

== Career ==
Taylor gained recognition when he was featured on Chief Keef's hit "I Don't Like", which garnered widespread international attention. He then gained popularity through his music videos, including "Us" and "Beef". He then caught the eye of producer No I.D., who had produced albums or tracks for artists such as Common, Kanye West, and others. This led Taylor to sign with hip hop label Def Jam.

In November 2012, he released a remix for his song "Us" with Rick Ross and Drake which later appeared on Rick Ross' mixtape The Black Bar Mitzvah. Taylor also created many songs with up-and-coming music producers, such as Young Chop. He is also featured on Juelz Santana's song "Bodies". In January 2013, Taylor released a remix to his song "Traffic" featuring Young Jeezy and Twista. On September 2, 2013, Taylor released his second solo mixtape Supa Savage, featuring guest appearances from Chief Keef, Lil Durk, Fredo Santana, L'A Capone, Wale and Waka Flocka Flame.

== Legal issues ==
In May 2010, Taylor pleaded guilty to burglary charges and was given two years of probation.

On October 24, 2012, a video allegedly showing Taylor assaulting a woman was posted to the internet. On April 28, 2013, Taylor was arrested by Chicago Police on a warrant issued two days earlier, based on charges of criminal trespass to a residence with persons present, battery, and mob action stemming from a February 2012 incident.

On June 23, 2013, Taylor was arrested in Chicago and charged with motor vehicle theft after an incident on April 13, 2013, after failing to provide proof of ownership for a BMW 750Li. However, the charge was later dropped. On July 13, 2013, Taylor was arrested again in Chicago for marijuana possession, which violated his probation.

In May 2022, Taylor was arrested for aggravated assault of a family member in Houston, Texas. He was released on January 12, 2023, after serving seven months in Harris County Jail.

On October 16, 2024, Taylor was sentenced to five years in prison on his aggravated assault charge.

== Personal life ==
=== 2019 shooting ===
On November 11, 2019, Taylor was shot in the neck and critically wounded at a busy intersection in the area of Markham and Country Club Hills. Country Club Hills police responded to 167th Street and Pulaski Road around 2:30 p.m. Witnesses told police Taylor was pursued by a driver of another car during a chase. Witnesses reported hearing as many as 12 gunshots during the chase. The driver of that vehicle got out of his car and shot the man with what witnesses called a small rifle and then fled the scene.

On November 18, Taylor sent out information about being released from the hospital and that he survived the shooting and is "Alive and Well". A day after leaving the hospital, he released a new song "Come Outside".

=== Twitter racism controversy ===
In March 2020, during the COVID-19 pandemic, Taylor posted a controversial message on Twitter: "Chinese people nasty asl man got the whole [world] fuck up". Many condemned him, calling his tweets racist. Taylor faced immediate backlash for his comment; many asked him to delete the tweet. After his Twitter account was suspended, he went on Instagram to post a screenshot of the official violation notification from Twitter with the captions, "Lol Look how the Chinese people did my Twitter".

=== 2021 shooting ===
On May 15, 2021, Taylor and two other men were injured in a shootout at a parking garage in Chicago and were taken to Northwestern Memorial Hospital. His eye was grazed by a gunshot; he and another one of the men, who was shot in the knee, were later listed in fair to good condition, and the third in critical condition with multiple wounds to the torso. The shooting was reportedly over a stolen Dodge Durango.

=== Conversion to Islam ===
While incarcerated in 2025, Taylor announced on social media that he took the shahada and converted to Islam.

== Discography ==
=== Mixtapes ===
- Don't Like (2012)
- Supa Savage (2013)
- Supa Savage 2 (2015)
- 300 Degrezz (2016)
- Better Days (2017)
- GetBackGang (2018)
- GetBackGang 2 (2019)
- Supa Savage 3 (2021)
- Demon Time (2022)
- Demon Time (Deluxe) (2023)
- Ask About Me (2023)

=== EPs ===
- Supa Vultures (w/ Lil Durk) (2017)
- Normal Backwrds (2018)
- Lamron 1 (2020)
- Lamron 2 (2021)
- Grim Reaper (2021)

=== Singles ===
==== As a lead artist ====
List of singles, showing year released and album name
Title	Year	Album
"Us"	2012	Don't Like
"Traffic" (featuring Chief Keef)	2012	Don't Like

==== As a featured artist ====
List of singles as featured performer, with selected chart positions, showing year released and album name
Title	Year	Peak chart positions			Certification	Album
Title	Year	US	US R&B	US Rap	Certification	Album
"I Don't Like" (Chief Keef featuring Lil Reese)	2012	73	20	15	RIAA: Platinum	Finally Rich
"Bang Like Chop" (Young Chop featuring Chief Keef and Lil Reese)	2014	—	—	—		Bang Like Chop

=== Guest appearances ===
List of non-single guest appearances, with other performing artists, showing year released and album name
Title	Year	Other artist(s)	Album
"OVA"	2012	Freddie Gibbs	—N/a
"Off the Shits"	2012	Lil Durk	I'm Still a Hitta
"My Lil Ni*gas"	2012	Fredo Santana, Chief Keef	It's a Scary Site
"Respect"	2012	Fredo Santana	It's a Scary Site
"Don't Try It"	2012	Frenchie	Concrete Jungle 2
"Nobody Move"	2012	Jay Stonez	—N/a
"Bodies"	2013	Juelz Santana	God Will'n
"S.O.S. (Smash on Sight)"	2013	Cap1, Lil Durk	T.R.U. 2 It
"No Lackin"	2013	Funkmaster Flex, Waka Flocka Flame, Wale	Who You Mad At? Me or Yourself?
"Competition"	2013	Lil Durk	Signed to the Streets
"Street Life"	2013	Lil Durk	Signed to the Streets
"Gangway (Remix)"	2013	Lil Herb	—N/a
"On My Soul"	2014	Lil Herb	Welcome to Fazoland
"On a T-Shirt"	2014	Plies	Purple Heart
"Bad Habits"	2015	Fredo Santana, Que	Ain't No Money Like Trap Money
"Go to War"	2015	Fredo Santana	Ain't No Money Like Trap Money
