= Bruce Ruffin =

- Born: 17 February 1952 (age 74); St Catherine, Jamaica
- Genres: Reggae, pop, rocksteady
- Occupations: Musician, singer, songwriter, ceo, managing director
- Instrument: Vocals
- Labels: Universal Music Group/Sanctuary Records Group, Rhino/EMI, Trojan and Beverley's
- Website: bruceruffin.com

Bruce Ruffin (born 17 February 1952) is a Jamaican rocksteady and reggae artist.

== Biography ==
Ruffin got his start singing with Byron Lee and the Dragonaires briefly, before in 1967 joining the Techniques, one of the more successful rocksteady vocal groups of the late 1960s. There he sang alongside Pat Kelly, Winston Riley and Junior Menns. He was one of several talented singers to drift through the Techniques' ranks, but his stay with the group was highlighted by several rocksteady hits that he wrote, the most notable of which was "Love Is Not a Gamble".

Restless, Ruffin left the Techniques a year later, returning in 1969 as a solo artist with the upbeat reggae song, "Long About Now".

His greatest success came in the 1970s as a reggae-pop solo artist and writer. He continued to record with a number of record producers (Leslie Kong, Herman Chin Loy, Lloyd Charmers) and had some success with cover versions, including Paul Simon's "Cecilia". However, it was a José Feliciano tune, "Rain", that would give his solo career momentum, recorded on Trojan Records, it was a UK number 19 hit in 1971 – the B-side of which was the karaoke favourite "Geronimo".

In 1972 he secured a crossover hit with "Mad About You", which featured odd background vocals and strings arrangement. It was released on the Rhino record label (not to be confused with Rhino Records), and gave him his biggest selling hit, reaching number 6 in Australia and 9 in the UK Singles Chart - it ultimately set the direction for his career. For the rest of the decade, Ruffin continued to release polished reggae-pop that had a strong audience in the UK and Europe. By the 1980s, Ruffin was concentrating on writing and publishing. He eventually moved away from music to study law, becoming a legal consultant to other reggae artists.

Ruffin is now the CEO of the BRM Music companies.
