= Dave and Ansell Collins =

Dave and Ansel Collins
- Origin: Kingston, Jamaica
- Genres: Reggae
- Labels: Trojan Records

Dave and Ansel Collins are a Jamaican vocal/instrumental duo (sometimes billed as Dave and Ansil Collins or Dave and Ansell Collins).

== History ==
Dave Barker (born David John Crooks, 10 October 1947, Kingston, Jamaica) is a session vocalist, and Ansel Collins (born 1949, also in Kingston) is a keyboard player. They were working for producer Lee "Scratch" Perry in Kingston in the late 1960s and joined forces in 1970 for the reggae single "Double Barrel". Released in late summer by Techniques Records, part of the Trojan Records label, it topped the Jamaican and UK charts in May of the following year. It was the first record that drummer Sly Dunbar (then aged 18) played on. In the US, the song appeared on an album of the same name, on Big Tree Records (BTS 2005).

The follow-up release, the similarly styled "Monkey Spanner" also enjoyed international success. Most of their recorded work was written by Winston Riley. After cutting an album, Collins and Barker parted company; Collins becoming a session player and Barker, now resident in the United Kingdom, singing with several soul groups. They attempted a comeback in 1981 without success.

In 1986, Ansel Collins appeared as one of Ernest Reed's (Jimmy Cliff) back-up musicians in the reggae-themed comedy film Club Paradise. He was billed as "Ansel 'Double Barrel' Collins". Collins has played and worked with The Upsetters, Black Uhuru, The Mighty Diamonds, Barrington Levy, Gregory Isaacs, U-Roy, Pama International and Jimmy Cliff.

"Double Barrel" was sampled by Special Ed on the song "I'm The Magnificent". Two of Barker's introductory exclamations ("Don't watch that, watch this!" from "Funky Funky Reggae" and "This is the heavy, heavy monster sound!" from "Monkey Spanner") were quoted by vocalist Chas Smash, in the introduction to the Madness single "One Step Beyond". It was also cited as an early influence by Daniel Ash of Bauhaus, Poptone, and Love and Rockets, as well as the first record he ever purchased.

In 2012, they reunited for several live shows including a performance at the Notting Hill Carnival.

== Discography ==
=== Studio albums ===
| Year | Album | Peak chart positions | |
| Year | Album | UK | US |
|---|---|---|---|
| 1971 | Double Barrel: Label: Trojan | 41 | — |
| 1974 | In Toronto: Label: G Clef; Canada-only release | — | — |
| 1976 | In The Ghetto: Label: Trojan | — | — |
"—" denotes a release that did not chart, was not released in the country or the information is unknown

=== Compilation albums ===
| Year | Album |
|---|---|
| 1998 | Heavy Heavy Monster Sounds of Dave and Ansel Collins: Label: Beatville |
| 2002 | Double Barrel – The Best of Dave & Ansel Collins: Label: Trojan Records |

=== Singles ===
| Year | Title | Peak chart positions | | |
| Year | Title | AUS | UK | US |
|---|---|---|---|---|
| 1970 | "Double Barrel": Label: Techniques | 8 | 1 | 22 |
| 1971 | "Monkey Spanner": Label: Techniques | — | 7 | — |
| 1972 | "Karaté": Label: Techniques | — | — | — |
| 1972 | "Shock of a Mighty": Label: Techniques | — | — | — |
| 1973 | "Top Up Kids": Label: Trojan | — | — | — |
| 1974 | "It Was Just My Imagination": Label: G Clef; Canada-only release | — | — | — |
| 1974 | "My Love": Label: G Clef; Canada-only release | — | — | — |
| 1975 | "Gonna Keep on Trying Till I Win Your Love": Label: Island | — | — | — |
| 1975 | "Single Barrel": Label: Klik | — | — | — |
"—" denotes a release that did not chart, was not released in the country or the information is unknown
