= Fat Trel =

American rapper from Virginia

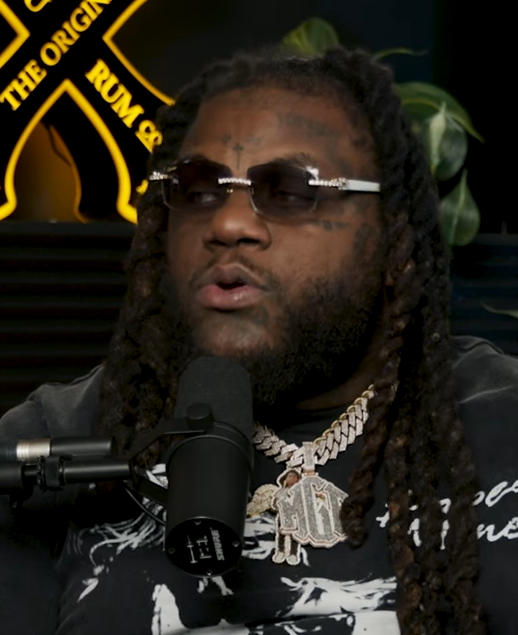
- Fat Trel in 2024

Background information
- Born: Martrel Reeves; June 26, 1990 (age 36); Danville, Virginia, U.S.
- Origin: Washington, D.C., U.S.
- Genre: DMV hip-hop
- Occupations: Rapper; songwriter
- Years active: 2008–present
- Labels: Slutty Boyz; MGE The Label; Asylum; Maybach Music; Atlantic; DTLA; Beryl Media; The Board Administration
- Children: 3
- Website: fattrel1135.com

Martrel Reeves (born June 26, 1990), better known by his stage name Fat Trel, is an American rapper. He was previously signed to Asylum Records, Rick Ross's record label Maybach Music Group, an imprint of Atlantic Records, and fellow DMV rapper Wale's label The Board Administration. From 2009 to 2016, Reeves released at least one solo mixtape per year.

== Musical career ==
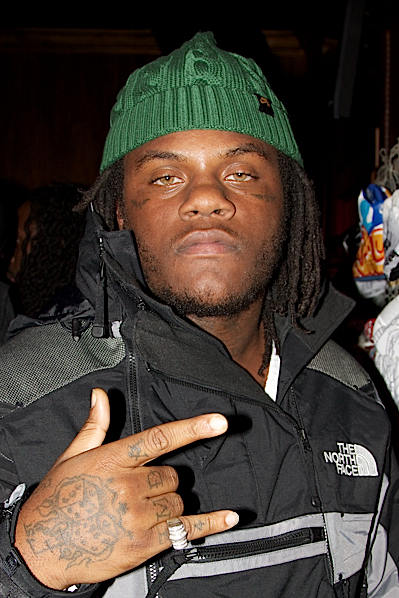
Fat Trel in 2010

=== 2011–12: Career beginnings ===
In 2011, Fat Trel released "Respect With The Tec" produced by Lex Luger. He was selected to perform with Juicy J, Smoke DZA and Joey Badass.

In 2012, Fat Trel released the mixtape Nightmare on E Street featuring Kirko Bangz, Cuz Quette, Red Café, Rick Ross and Big K.R.I.T. and also worked with Chief Keef on "Russian Roulette". Fat Trel then joined Master P's Louie V Mob along with Alley Boy. Master P, Fat Trel and Alley Boy released a free mixtape as Louie V Mob on February 12, 2013, titled New World Order. In addition to Master P, Trel and Alley, the tape also features guest appearances by Gucci Mane, E-40 and other artists. On August 19, 2013, Fat Trel released SDMG (which stands for "Sex, Drugs, Money, Guns"). The mixtape features guest appearances by Wale, Black Cobain, Magazeen, Smoke DZA, Danny Brown, YG, Red Café and others. The production was handled by Young Chop, Cardo, Harry Fraud, DJ Mustard and others.

=== 2013–2014: Signing with Rick Ross and Gleesh ===
On November 6, 2013, MMG announced that they had signed Fat Trel. Fat Trel released his first project on MMG, Gleesh on April 1, 2014. Gleesh is a 15-track mixtape with guest appearances from Rick Ross, Wale, Rockie Fresh, Tracy T, Stalley and others, with production from All Star, Harry Fraud, Young Chop and others. Ultimately, Gleesh would be the only project Fat Trel released with MMG.

=== 2015–17: Georgetown, Muva Russia and SDMG 2 ===
Fat Trel released his mixtape, Georgetown on June 9, 2015. The mixtape is a 16-track mixtape with guest appearances from Wale, Rick Ross, and Fetty Wap, among others. On December 25, 2015, on Christmas Day, Fat Trel released another mixtape called Muva Russia with Trap-A-Holics. The mixtape serves as Trel's second and last project of 2015. On June 28, 2016, Fat Trel released his mixtape, SDMG 2. The mixtape served as a sequel to his 2013 mixtape SDMG.

On January 27, 2017, Trel teamed up with his MMG labelmate Yowda, and they released a mixtape titled Fat & Ugly. On April 1, 2017, he released a song titled "Rain" featuring American rapper Lil Durk. On July 27, 2017, he released another single called "Bachelor".

Trel released a single called "Fuck 12" on October 21, 2017. The song was produced by his frequent collaborator, Yung Lan. This marks his first song since his release from jail. He released a music video for the song on November 3, 2017, on his YouTube page. He later announced that his next project, titled Finally Free, will be released soon.

=== 2018–19: Finally Free, On the Run and On the Run 2 ===
Fat Trel released a music video for the song called "Low Life" on April 6, 2018, on WorldStarHipHop and YouTube, and the video was later uploaded on Trel's YouTube page on April 13, nine days prior. The song was produced by King LeeBoy. The song was later released on April 19, 2018, on streaming platforms. On April 21, 2018, Trel released another song called "Large Amount", which marked as the one and only single for the forthcoming mixtape Finally Free. The song was later released on commercial streaming platforms 12 days later.

Fat Trel released his Finally Free mixtape on July 13, 2018. This was his first mixtape after being released from prison. One week later, the mixtape was re-released on commercial streaming platforms, serving as Trel's first commercial mixtape release. Two months later, Fat Trel released another project titled On The Run, on October 8, 2018. This marks as his second mixtape release of 2018. And, On December 21, 2018, Trel released another mixtape, On The Run 2. It was served as a sequel to his previous mixtape On The Run, which was released two months prior. This marks as his third and last mixtape release of 2018. And, on July 5, 2019, Trel released his next mixtape, called 1901.

=== 2020–22: Big Homie, Fat & Ugly 2 and signing to Asylum Records ===
On June 26, 2020, Fat Trel released his mixtape Big Homie, under the Slutty Boyz imprint, DTLA Records, with distribution by Beryl Media. On September 8, 2020, he later collabed with Yowda again, and they both released a mixtape called, Fat & Ugly 2, which is a sequel to their previous 2017 collab tape Fat & Ugly. This mixtape marks as Fat Trel's final mixtape release under the Maybach Music Group label imprint. On October 1, 2020, he released a single titled "Keep Yo Problems", featuring Rashad Stark.

On October 15, 2021, after he was released from jail, he quickly reconnected with Rick Ross, who remains close with Fat Trel despite him no longer being part of the MMG label. He released a song called "Last Day In" on November 10, 2021, which marks as Trel's first song since his release from prison. Two days later, the song was later released on streaming services under the Slutty Boyz and MGE The Label imprint.

On June 16, 2022, he released a music video for the song called "LLB3 (Long Live Boosa)" on his YouTube. On June 17, 2022, he released the song on streaming platforms via Asylum Records, the day after the music video of the song was released. On June 21, 2022, Fat Trel announced that he had signed a deal with Asylum Records. On February 24, 2023, he was featured in Logic's new album "College Park" in the song "Gaithersburg Freestyle."

== Legal issues ==
In 2016, Fat Trel was arrested twice in unrelated incidents. In March, he was arrested in Anne Arundel County for using counterfeit currency at a Maryland casino. Fat Trel claimed he got the money from a D.C. convenience store ATM. In April, he was arrested in Arlington County, Virginia for driving while intoxicated, narcotics distribution, speeding, and other charges. He spent over a year in Arlington County Jail, before being released on September 22, 2017. While in prison, he recorded nearly 250 songs.

On July 8, 2018, Fat Trel was pulled over in Prince George's County, Maryland for traffic violations and had his vehicle searched. Police found a .40 caliber privately made pistol with ten rounds of ammunition in the car. Fat Trel told police the weapon was his and he was arrested. He faced a maximum of 10 years in federal prison and pleaded guilty on September 22, 2020. On September 24, 2021, U.S. District Judge Paula Xinis sentenced Fat Trel to two years and six months in federal prison, followed by three years of supervised release. On October 15, 2021, Fat Trel was released from prison due to time served.

On December 8, 2021, Fat Trel was later arrested again, and he was booked at the Arlington County Sheriff's Office on four counts of a Revocation of Suspended Sentence and Probation in connection to a 2018 arrest. Trel was in custody awaiting bond and has a court date scheduled for January 14, 2022. On January 14, 2022, he was sentenced to a year and a half in prison. On November 21, 2022, Fat Trel was finally released from prison.

== Personal life ==
Fat Trel has two sons and a daughter. He is a Christian.

In 2018, after being released from prison, Fat Trel told XXL that he was sober and his mixtape Finally Free was the first mixtape he produced sober. He described the challenges of quitting lean and cited the death of Fredo Santana as a wake up call.
