= Fredo Santana =

American rapper (1990–2018)

- Fredo Santana in 2015

Background information
- Born: Derrick Antonio Coleman; July 4, 1990; Chicago, Illinois, U.S.
- Died: January 19, 2018 (aged 27) Los Angeles, California, U.S.
- Genres: Midwestern hip-hop; drill; trap
- Occupations: Rapper; songwriter
- Years active: 2011–2018
- Labels: RBC; Savage Squad; Glory Boyz
- Website: ssrbrand.com

Derrick Antonio Coleman (July 4, 1990 – January 19, 2018), known professionally as Fredo Santana, was an American rapper. The older cousin of rapper Chief Keef, Santana began his career in 2011. His debut studio album, Trappin Ain't Dead (2013), peaked at number 45 on the US Top R&B/Hip-Hop Albums chart. Santana died of a seizure on January 19, 2018.

== Career ==
Fredo's first mixtape, It's a Scary Site, was released on September 20, 2012. It featured production by TM88, Young Chop, 12Hunna, Leek E Leek, J-Hill, C-Sick, and Paris Bueller as well as guest appearances from Chief Keef, Lil Reese, King L, Gino Marley, Frenchie, Lil Herb, Lil Bibby, and Lil Durk. Santana's second mixtape, Fredo Kruger, was released on February 28, 2013, and featured production by 808 Mafia, Young Chop and Mike Will Made It, as well as guest appearances from Migos, Juelz Santana, Soulja Boy, Young Scooter, Fat Trel, Alley Boy, Lil Durk and Lil Reese among others. It would later be released for retail sale via iTunes on May 7, 2013.

On September 24, 2013, Fredo Santana made a cameo appearance in Drake's music video for "Hold On, We're Going Home", in which he portrayed a bad guy kidnapping Drake's "girlfriend".

His debut album, Trappin Ain't Dead, was released on November 20, 2013. The album featured guest appearances by Kendrick Lamar, Chief Keef, Peewee Longway and other members of Glory Boyz Entertainment. It's a Scary Site 2 was released on December 20, 2013.

On February 27, 2014, Santana announced that he and Keef were going to release a collaboration album Blood Thicker Than Water, which never came to fruition. On July 9, 2014, he revealed the track list for his upcoming album Walking Legend.

== Personal life ==
Santana was the older cousin of Chicago rapper Chief Keef.

=== Health problems ===
Santana was a heavy user of drugs, at one point being addicted to Xanax and Lean. Santana attributed his heavy drug use to trauma experienced during his childhood, admitting he had post-traumatic stress disorder and turned to drugs as a coping mechanism.

Santana was hospitalized in March 2017 after having a seizure, which he blamed on a heavy workload and his poor sleep schedule. After the seizures persisted, Santana was diagnosed with idiopathic epilepsy in May 2017 and was prescribed Keppra to treat it. Despite the medicine, Santana continued to have seizures, usually multiple in a row.

Santana was hospitalized once again in October 2017 after friend and fellow rapper Gino Marley found Santana mid-seizure on the floor of his house with blood coming from his mouth. He was rushed to hospital and diagnosed with both liver and kidney failure, with the main factors being his addiction to Xanax and Lean. Santana expressed interest in going to rehab while in the hospital.

== Death ==
On the evening of January 19, 2018, at around 11:30 p.m. local time, Santana's girlfriend discovered him unresponsive at their home in Reseda, Los Angeles. Shortly after, Santana was pronounced dead, aged 27. He had a fatal seizure, and an autopsy revealed he had developed cardiovascular disease in addition to the previous conditions he had.

== Discography ==
=== Studio albums ===
Studio album, with chart position
Title	Album details	Peak chart positions	
Title	Album details	US R&B/HH	US Heat.
Trappin Ain't Dead	Released: October 31, 2013; Label: Savage Squad Records; Formats: Digital download	45	12
Fredo Kruger 2	Released: September 8, 2017; Label: Savage Squad Records, Empire; Formats: Digital download	—	—

=== Mixtapes ===
- It's a Scary Site (2012)
- Fredo Kruger (2013)
- Street Shit (with Gino Marley) (2013)
- It's a Scary Site 2 (2013)
- Walking Legend (2014)
- Ain't No Money Like Trap Money (2015)
- Fredo Mafia (with 808 Mafia) (2016)
- Plugged In (2017)

=== Singles ===
List of singles, showing year released and album name
Title	Year	Album
"I Need More" (featuring Young Scooter)	2013	Fredo Kruger
"Bird Talk"	2013	It's a Scary Site 2
"Jealous" (featuring Kendrick Lamar)	2013	Trappin Ain't Dead
"It's Only Right"	2014	Walking Legend
"Go Live" (featuring Chief Keef, Ballout and Tadoe)	2017	Fredo Kruger 2 and The Golden One

=== Guest appearances ===
- "Familiar"
  (with Ty Dolla Sign) (2014)
