= Drill music =

Subgenre of hip-hop

- Other names: Drill; drill rap
- Stylistic origins: Midwestern hip-hop; trap; gangsta rap; footwork
- Cultural origins: Early 2010s, Parkway Gardens, Chicago, Illinois, United States
- Typical instruments: Vocals; synthesizer; sampler; audio editing software (digital audio workstation); drum machine (Roland TR-808)
- Derivative forms: Mumble rap

Subgenres
- Atlanta drill; Bronx drill; Brooklyn drill; Detroit drill; UK drill

Fusion genres
- Jersey club rap

Drill music, also known as drill rap or simply drill, is a subgenre of hip-hop music with sonic origins in trap music and lyrical origins in gangsta rap. It began in Chicago, Illinois, United States, in the early 2010s. Drill lyricism is noted for its ominous, confrontational nature, often including references to gang rivalries and various retaliatory incidents, sometimes murder, although the subgenre is thematically broader. Drill artists often address authentic, real-life conflicts, at times incorporating artistic expressions such as bravado, taunting, and mockery.

Early drill artists are typically noted for their associations with crime in Chicago, especially with the Black Disciples and Gangster Disciples. The genre garnered mainstream attention in 2012 following the success of pioneering Chicago rappers like Chief Keef, Lil Durk, Lil Reese, Fredo Santana, G Herbo, Lil Bibby, King Louie, FBG Duck, and producer Young Chop. (Note: Attributed to multiple sources:) Other rappers, such as Lil JoJo, S. Dot, Edai, L'A Capone, RondoNumbaNine, Lil Mister, SD and producers Smylez and Leek-E-Leek also contributed to the early drill scene. (Note: Attributed to multiple sources:) Additionally, DJs including DJ Kenn Aon and DJ Hustlenomics were conducive to the subgenre's early growth. Female rappers such as Sasha Go Hard, Katie Got Bandz, and the group Pretty N Pink developed the distinctive feminine style of drill music.

Drill music saw a resurgence in the mainstream during the late 2010s and early 2020s with artists such as King Von, Polo G, Calboy and a revamped Lil Durk. (Note: Attributed to multiple sources:) By the 2020s, drill's popularity spread globally, with the BBC in 2021 describing drill as "the sound of the global youth". The UK drill scene emerged in the late 2010s, leading to the prominence of artists such as 67, Harlem Spartans, CGM, and Skengdo x AM. UK drill subsequently influenced regional scenes in Europe and America, including Brooklyn drill, which gained mainstream popularity in the early 2020s with artists like Pop Smoke and Fivio Foreign. Drill scenes have been noted in such locales as Ireland, Australia, the Netherlands, Ghana, Uganda, Denmark and France.

The subgenre's controversial nature has stimulated discussion. Public debate about the implications drill rap has raged, while some authorities, elected officials, and commentators in the UK and America castigate the genre and its artists, claiming that drill rap catalyzes real world violence. On the other hand, it has been counterargued that drill illuminates harsh societal realities, resonating closely with the disenfranchised youth audience, and that artists are within their right to self-expression. Attempts at curtailing the subgenre, including deleting posted music videos, blockading performances, and admitting song lyrics in court as criminal evidence, have been put in practice in the UK and America, generating further controversy.

== Characteristics ==
Love Sosa – Chief Keef (2012)
Chief Keef's "Love Sosa"

=== Lyrics ===
Drill lyrics tend to be adversarial and aggressive, sometimes with a "combative energy". The Guardian's Lucy Stehlik said, "Nihilistic drill reflects real life where its squeaky-clean hip-hop counterparts have failed." Drill lyrics strongly contrast with the subject matter of earlier Chicago rappers and contemporary mainstream hip hop which at the time of drill's emergence tended to glorify and celebrate a rise to wealth.

Drill lyrics typically reflect crime on the streets, and tend to be gritty, violent, realistic, and nihilistic. The Philadelphia Inquirer describes drill lyrics as "celebrating violence" and that the songs "often explicitly describe shootings, mock victims, and taunt enemies". According to DJ Drewski of Hot 97, "That's what started the whole New York drill [scene] was if I beef with you, or if I got a problem with you, I'm gonna say it on this record". In drill lyrics, the term "opp" or "opps" (an abbreviation of the word "opposition") is frequently used to refer to enemy gang members and rivals. Drill rappers use a grim, deadpan delivery, often filtered through Auto-Tune, influenced by the "stoned, aimless warbling of Soulja Boy (one of the earliest non-local Keef collaborators) and Lil Wayne before him." Atlanta-based rappers Gucci Mane and Waka Flocka Flame were important influences on the early drill rappers.

=== Production ===
The BBC states that "Whereas trap, the Atlanta-born rap style that dominated hip-hop for most of the 2000s, is often rhythmically rigid – with a snare falling on the third beat of each bar – drill moves to skippy, syncopated hi-hat patterns echoing the rapid fire of a machine gun".

The Guardian called drill production style the "sonic cousin to skittish footwork, southern-fried hip-hop and the 808 trigger-finger of trap." Young Chop is frequently identified by critics as the genre's most characteristic producer. The sound of trap producer Lex Luger's music is a major influence on drill, and Young Chop identified Shawty Redd, Drumma Boy, and Zaytoven as important precursors to drill. Chicago drill is traditionally characterized by synth brass and bell melodic elements, use of the crash cymbal, and busy snare drum patterns.

UK drill production, which is commonly utilized in Brooklyn drill, is characterized by a faster BPM, 808s "slides," and more syncopated drum rhythms—including the use of a sped-up tresillo rhythm in the hi hat patterns.

=== Artistry ===
Drillers tend to be young; many prominent musicians in the scene started getting attention while still in their teens. One of the genre's most prominent musicians, Chief Keef, was 16 when he signed a multi-million dollar record contract with Interscope, and in an extreme example, Lil Wayne co-signed the 13-year-old driller Lil Mouse. Critics have noted drill rappers' lack of concern with metaphor or wordplay. Chief Keef said that his simplistic flow is a conscious stylistic choice:

"I know what I'm doing. I mastered it. And I don't even really use metaphors or punchlines. 'Cause I don't have to. But I could. ... I think that's doing too much. I'd rather just say what's going on right now. ... I don't really like metaphors or punchlines like that."

Whet Moser of Chicago Magazine wrote that Keef's songs are "lyrically, rhythmically, and emotionally diminished, which is why they sound so airless and claustrophobic ... It's not even fatalistic, because that would imply a self-consciousness, a moral consideration, that isn't there in the lyrics. It just is, over and over again." A profile on the scene in The New York Times examined the genre's aggression:

"With rare exception this music is unmediated and raw and without bright spots, focused on anger and violence. The instinct is to call this tough, unforgiving and concrete-hard music joyless, but in truth it's exuberant in its darkness. Most of its practitioners are young and coming into their creative own against a backdrop of outrageous violence in Chicago, particularly among young people—dozens of teenagers have been killed in Chicago this year—and often related to gangs. (There's a long history of overlap between Chicago's gangs and Chicago's rap.) That their music is a symphony of ill-tempered threats shouldn't be a surprise."

== History ==
=== Early drill ===
David Drake of Complex said drill is not defined by any particular production style, but "is about the entirety of the culture: the lingo, the dances, the mentality, and the music, much of which originated in 'Dro City', a gang-defined territory of city blocks in the Woodlawn neighborhood."

In street slang, "drill" means to fight or retaliate, and "can be used for anything from females getting dolled up to all out war in the streets." Dro City rapper Pac Man, considered the stylistic originator and forefather of the subgenre, is credited as the first to apply the term to the local hip hop music. Pac Man's 2010 track, "It's a Drill," is the first instance of the term being connected to the genre.

Regarding drill rappers' use of early social media, musician Naledge stated that Drill rappers "understood virality in a way that I believe goes unremarked in terms of their genius and their ability to use social media to garner large audiences".

Drake described the drill scene as a major vehicle of the early 2010s rise of Chicago hip hop, and described the scene as a grassroots movement that had incubated in a closed, interlocking system: on the streets and through social media in a network of clubs and parties and amongst high schools. Drill developed on the South Side of Chicago, in the midst of escalating violence and a homicide crisis. Mark Guarino wrote for Salon that the music grew during "a shift from historic feuding between monolithic crime organizations controlling thousands of members each to intrapersonal squabbling and retaliatory conflicts among smaller hybrid groups whose control extends just a few blocks... The toughened reality of living in these neighborhoods is what shaped Drill music." In the drill scene, rap conflict and gang conflict overlap, and many of the young rappers come from backgrounds with experience of violence. The Independent's Sam Gould wrote that Chief Keef "represents both a scary strain of current hip hop culture and a seriously alienated group within American society."

YouTube was a platform for many drill rappers to release their music videos on, and ultimately significantly contributed to the genre's popularity. Chief Keef is considered the primary progenitor and popularizer of drill music, responsible for bringing it to the mainstream. His first music video appearance was in April 2011 as a feature on fellow Chicago drill rapper S. Dot's music video for his remix of Hustle Hard. In 2011 and 2012, he recorded multiple singles, including "Love Sosa", "I Don't Like" and "Bang", which became viral hits, and was subsequently offered a deal from Interscope Records. Around the same time, King Louie, another drill rapper, was given a record deal from Epic Records.

By late 2012, rappers from other scenes and hip hop stars like Kanye West, Drake and Rick Ross were collaborating with drill musicians. Kanye West remixed "I Don't Like" for the 2012 GOOD Music compilation Cruel Summer as "Don't Like", with features from West, Chief Keef, Pusha T, Big Sean and Jadakiss. West cited drill as an influence on his 2013 album Yeezus, and Chief Keef and King Louie had vocals featured on the album.

New Jersey DJ Akademiks's commentary YouTube channel 'War in Chiraq' played a significant role in presenting the early Chicago drill scene to a wider audience. It had a quarter million subscribers and 94 million views in its first two years. Akademiks is quoted saying "I’ve done a lot to create narratives and help rappers themselves."

Videographers A Zae Production and DGainz were leading videographers on the early drill scene. DGainz directed Chief Keef's debut music video for Bang, and Chief Keef's breakthrough music video for Love Sosa, which was pivotal for the mainstreamization of the drill genre. Videographer ZackTV also played a significant role in the exposure of Chicago's early drill scene to a wider audience. The YouTube interviews he conducted includes coverage such as Chief Keef's first on-camera interview, along with interviews with artists such as L'A Capone and RondoNumbaNine. ZackTV's work also sparked a media niche of intimate on-scene video journalism of the Chicago gangland culture behind the drill music, which had not been done before at the time. ZackTV was considered a mentor by other gangland reporters in that niche around the country. He was active until his murder in April 2019.

Drill's subject matter strongly contrasts with that of earlier Chicago rappers such as Kid Sister, Lupe Fiasco, Psalm One, Rhymefest, and The Cool Kids.

Older Chicago rappers have been mixed in their reaction to drill's popularity and violence. In a radio interview, rapper Lupe Fiasco said "Chief Keef scares me. Not him specifically, but just the culture that he represents ... The murder rate in Chicago is skyrocketing, and you see who's doing it and perpetrating it—they all look like Chief Keef." After Chief Keef threatened Fiasco on Twitter, Fiasco said he was considering quitting the music scene. Rhymefest tweeted that drill is "the theme music to murder."

Chief Keef's debut album, "Finally Rich", released on Interscope Records in late 2012, was subsequently described as a "classic" album in the genre. Despite the warm critique, "Finally Rich" sold an underwhelming 50,000 units in the first week, which resulted in record labels subsequently overreacting, deeming it a "fad".

=== Drill expansion ===
==== UK drill ====
While Chicago drill rap saw a decline in mainstream popularity after 2012, a new scene was emerging in the UK and by the late-2010s was gaining mainstream popularity, spreading across Europe, influencing the creation of drill scenes around the continent. UK drill is a subgenre of drill music and road rap that originated in the South London district of Brixton from 2013 onwards. Borrowing heavily from the style of Chicago drill music, UK drill artists often rap about violent and hedonistic criminal lifestyles. Typically, those who create this style of music are affiliated with gangs or come from socioeconomically deprived neighborhoods where crime is a way of life for many.

The Guardian writes that "Born in Chicago, a city whose working-class black population, like London’s, has arguably been left to fend for itself and descended into violence, drill was initially a cold, bombastic style of gangsta rap. Its biggest breakout star was arguably Chief Keef, famous for his 2012 track I Don’t Like. The style filtered over to the UK, and was picked up by a young generation MCs keen to define themselves away from the grime of an older generation. While other corners of black British music have explored African pop and dancehall, resulting in the lascivious and relatively carefree “afro-swing” and “afro-trap” styles, drill has looked to the US, and the tales of violence that have been a feature of rap there since the 90s."

UK drill music is closely related to road rap, a British style of gangsta rap that became popular in the years prior to the existence of drill. UK drill often exhibits violent language and provocative lyrics. It evolved its own distinct style of production compared to Chicago drill with UK drill group 67 often credited for shifting the sound away from the Chicago influences it seemed to heavily draw inspiration from in its early days and foundation and for forming a more homegrown sound, with LD – a member of 67 – being named as the godfather of UK drill.

==== Brooklyn drill ====
The early 2010s saw the emergence of Chicago-influenced Brooklyn drill artists such as Bobby Shmurda and Rowdy Rebel, while the late 2010s saw the emergence of new prominent drill artists from Brooklyn such as the late Pop Smoke, as well as Sheff G, Fivio Foreign, Sleepy Hallow and 22Gz.

Later Brooklyn drill production is heavily influenced by UK drill (the latter of which brings production influences from grime and UK garage) with artists such as Fivio Foreign, Sheff G, Smoove'L, Bizzy Banks, 22Gz, and Pop Smoke collaborating with UK drill producers such as 808Melo, Yamaica Productions, Yoz Beats, Tommyprime and AXL Beats. Pop Smoke's 2019 single "Welcome to the Party", produced by 808Melo, was a prominent release that year and saw remixes from Nicki Minaj, Meek Mill and British MC Skepta. Sheff G's 2017 song "No Suburban" and 22Gz's 2016 song "Suburban" have been credited for bringing attention to later Brooklyn drill.

== Controversy and debate ==
Brooklyn and Bronx drill artists who were victims of violence include TDott Woo, Pop Smoke, 18-year old Chii Wvttz, 22-year old Mikquale Cooper, 14-year old Notti Osama, 17-year old Jordany Aracena, Nick Blixky, Lil Tjay, and Nas Blixky (the latter two surviving the shootings against them). Brooklyn and Bronx drill rappers charged with violent and gang related crimes include Sheff G and Sleepy Hallow, C Blu, Kay Flock, Nay Benz, and Sha EK. The 2020s spate of gang violence and the rise of drill rap in New York City led some authorities, including New York City mayor Eric Adams, officers with the New York City Police Department, and Brooklyn district attorney Eric Gonzalez, to view drill rap as fuel for New York City's gang violence. District Attorney Gonzalez stated in 2022 that there were "a number of shootings in Brooklyn recently that are directly related to drill ... These drill rap videos are causing young people to lose their lives. It's not that the music is the cause of the violence, but it's fueling the desire to retaliate". Brandon Terry, an associate professor of social sciences at Harvard University, commented that "Elected officials like Mayor Eric Adams in New York have described drill music as a kind of devilish bargain, where music industry executives and social media companies accelerate and commodify gang violence for profit". In September 2022, the NYPD ordered the removal of local drill artists from the Rolling Loud festival, due to concerns of public safety and fears that the rappers would incite violence, which led to criticism from labels such as Warner Records, who said they believed mentorship for their artists was key in keeping them from crime.

Erik Nielson, co-author of the 2019 book "Rap on Trial: Race, Lyrics, and Guilt in America" told ABC News that drill music's "primary connection to violence is artistic and creative" and that the music provides for rappers "a way out of the violent neighborhoods that they chronicle." Jabari Evans, a professor of race and media at the University of South Carolina, noted that drill artists have a right to self-expression, stating "it's easy to make drill a scapegoat," but that "in reality, the situations, the spaces, places, and problems that existed in certain communities existed far before drill". Prominent Brooklyn drill rapper Fivio Foreign stated in defense of the genre, "It’s not the music that’s killing people, it’s the music that’s helping n----- from the hood get out the hood".

Jonathan Ilan, senior lecturer of sociology at London's City University, argued against censuring UK drill, writing in The British Journal of Criminology that drill rappers exaggerate and fabricate violence in their lyrics. He wrote that "This is not to deny that crime and violence take place involving drillers as either victims or perpetrators – rather, it emphasises not to view the violence as directly related to, caused by or evidenced by the music". He further stated that efforts to criminalise drill marginalised communities, "ultimately exacerbating the conditions which lead to urban violence in the first place". American professor of sociology at Stanford, Forrest Stuart, made similar remarks, cautioning that "villainizing drill music gives the carceral system ammunition against young Black men", such as authorities issuing additional criminal charges against rappers for having replica guns in a video.

Drill has been criticized by rappers such as Lupe Fiasco and Dee-1, the latter stating in a public forum about drill music, "As a consumer, you have the choice to literally support whatever it is that you would like to see more of ... If you truly want to see your conditions change, as an artist you have a choice to say, 'I might have to sacrifice some popularity or some paper for the sake of putting out content that is actually progressive and conducive to a better world around us.'"

Some rappers noticed that their music received more attention and streams from hip-hop fans after incorporating disses against deceased rivals into their music, and some drill music has gone viral after incorporating such disses. The Philadelphia Inquirer reported that teen drill rappers in Philadelphia "fueled by the pursuit of fame and money ... came to believe the formula to success was to dis the dead. Shocking lyrics about violence, they learned, drew hundreds of thousands — sometimes millions — of listeners to their songs". In some cases, the rappers did not know or had never met the rivals that they dissed. Several progenitors of drill, including rappers Lil Durk, and Chief Keef, have distanced themselves from or have discouraged the practice of dissing deceased rivals in drill music.

In response to deaths and crime arising out of the Brooklyn and Bronx drill scene, in early 2022 a number of prominent New York DJs and music influencers, including DJ Drewski at Hot 97, Joe Budden, Ebro Darden of "Ebro in the Morning" on Hot 97, D-Teck, and Power 105.1's DJ Gabe P either vowed to stop playing drill and diss records or re-iterated their refusal to play such content.

Some mothers of victims dissed in drill songs have publicly commented about feeling frustration and pain after hearing their sons being disrespected in drill songs, and some have called for an end to the violence and justice for their sons. (Note: Attributed to multiple sources:) These include the mother of Shondale "Tooka" Gregory, a Chicago teen and alleged member of the Gangster Disciples who was killed in 2011, and was subsequently mocked in the music of rappers Chief Keef, Lil Durk, and King Von. Gregory's mother said, "Why? That’s all I have to ask them. What has my son done to y'all to make y'all disrespect him like this? Every song they make has got, 'We smokin' on Tooka' ... You know how long my son has been gone? Since 2011. This is 2022 and he's still a trending topic".

Some French drill artists such as Freeze Corleone have been in trouble (concerts cancelled, restricted distribution) due to their positions towards slavery, Jews, geopolitical conflicts, terrorism, pedophiles, conspiracy theories, sexism and politics.

== In popular culture ==
The 2023 We TV drama series Kold x Windy revolves around two women, played by Sh'Kia Augustin and Nijah Brenea, trying to make it in the violent world of drill music.

== See also ==
- Gangs in Chicago
- Diss song
- Answer song
- List of diss tracks
- Martial music
- Murder ballad
- War song
- War poetry
- Battle rap
- Flyting
- Dozens (game)
- Death poetry
- 2010s in music
- 2020s in music
- Music censorship
