= Young Chop =

American record producer, rapper and songwriter

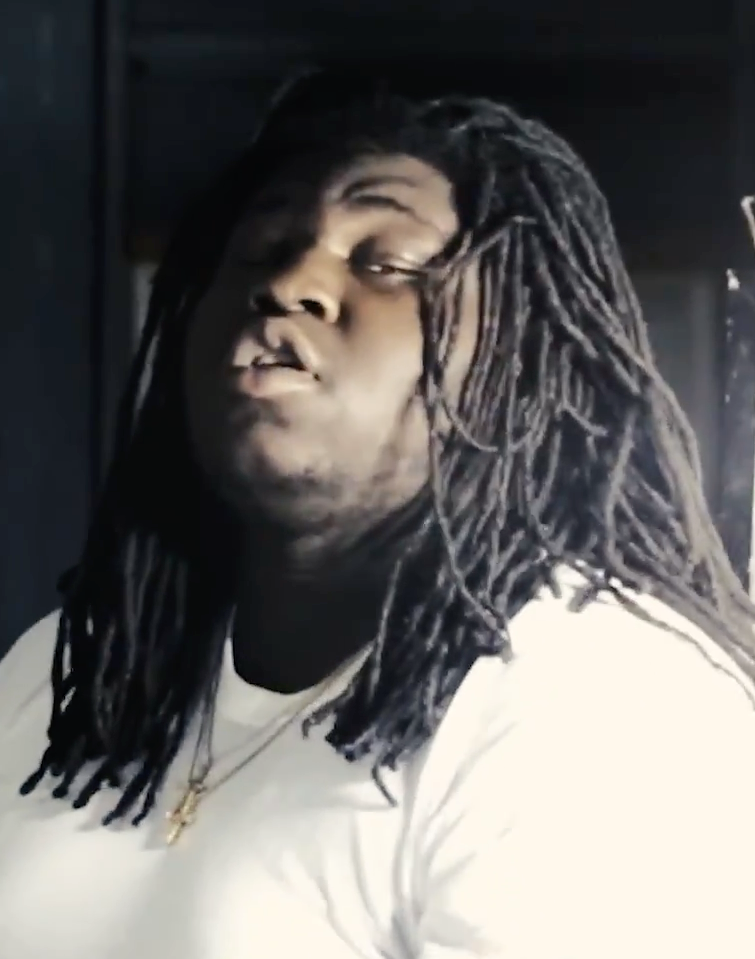
- Pittman in 2015

Background information
- Born: Tyree Lamar Pittman; November 14, 1993 (age 32); Chicago, Illinois, U.S.
- Genres: Hip-hop; trap; drill
- Occupations: Record producer; rapper; songwriter
- Years active: 2010–present
- Labels: EMPIRE; Chop Squad; Glo Gang; E1; RBC
- Website: chopsquadworldwide.com

Tyree Lamar Pittman (born November 14, 1993), better known by his stage name Young Chop, is an American record producer, rapper, and songwriter. He is best known for producing drill hip hop music, and for producing many of Chief Keef's early hits, including "I Don't Like", "Love Sosa", "Winnin", and "3Hunna".

== Life and career ==
Pittman grew up in the South Side of Chicago, Illinois. Pittman started making beats when he was 11 years old with the help of his cousin, although he was initially a rapper. He met Chief Keef on Facebook and went on to produce many of his songs. Chief Keef's Back From The Dead was officially the first mixtape he produced. Pittman started his own independent label called Chop Squad. He also started a website, SoundKitWiz.com, an online retail music production website. His producer tag is "Young Chop On the Beat", spoken by his then 4 year old cousin.

== Controversy ==
In 2012, Pittman was displeased with Kanye West's remix of "I Don't Like" and threatened to sue him. The matter was resolved in the same year, though West's artist, Pusha T, would diss Pittman on a separate record.

In 2015, Pittman got into a brawl with security at a festival in Atlanta.

In April 2020, Pittman uploaded a video on Instagram of him firing shots outside his house after people outside were calling his name. In 2020, Pittman entered into a feud with Atlanta-based rapper 21 Savage, eventually streaming himself on Instagram Live while in an Uber in Atlanta looking for Savage.

On April 16, 2020, Pittman was arrested in Gwinnett County, Georgia for violating his probation. He was also charged with aggravated cruelty to animals after allegedly starving his dog to death in February 2020. In 2024, while in jail, he was involved in a fight. Young Chop was recently released from incarceration.

== Discography ==
=== Studio albums ===
- Precious (2013)
- Still (2014)
- Fat Gang or No Gang (2015)
- Finally Rich Too (2015) (Note: Originally titled as Finally Rich 2.)
- King Chop (2016)
- Coppotelli (2016)
- King Chop 2 (2018)
- Don't Sleep (2019)
- Comfortable (2019)
- Young Godfather (2020)
- Intro x Young Godfather (2020)
- Under Surveillance (2021)
