= JuiceWrld 9 9 9 =

EP by Juice WRLD
- Released: June 15, 2017
- Recorded: 2017–2018
- Length: 27:12
- Labels: Self-released (initial release); Grade A/Interscope (re-release)
- Producers: Sidepce; Lapalux; Nick Mira

Juice WRLD chronology
Heartbroken in Hollywood 9 9 9 (2017)	JuiceWrld 9 9 9 (2017)	BingeDrinkingMusic (2017)

Singles from JuiceWrld 9 9 9
- 1. "Lucid Dreams" Released: June 15, 2017; 2. "Moonlight" Released: June 15, 2017

JuiceWrld 9 9 9 is the fifth EP by Chicago rapper & singer Juice WRLD. It was self-released on June 15, 2017 and re-released on March 13, 2018, through Grade A Productions and Interscope Records. Production was primarily handled by Nick Mira and Sidepce. The eight track project is led by hit single, "Lucid Dreams".

== Background ==
The extended play was recorded and originally released in June 2017. This project delves deep into the staples of emo-rap with recurring themes such as broken relationships and drug abuse. "Lucid Dreams" was added to the tracklist when it released one month later. “Lucid Dreams” was also featured on Juice WRLD’s debut studio album “Goodbye & Good Riddance” (released on May 23, 2018), which boosted the song even more and the song also has a remix featuring rapper Lil Uzi Vert that was released in May 2021 as a track on the Goodbye & Good Riddance 3-year anniversary edition release. JuiceWRLD 9 9 9 is led by the hit single, "Lucid Dreams". Track 1, “Moonlight”, and track 7 “Let Me Know (I Wonder Why Freestyle)” are also popular fan favorites. JuiceWRLD 9 9 9 aided Juice Wrld in gaining SoundCloud acclaim.

== Track listing ==
No.	Title	Length
1.	"Moonlight"	2:59
2.	"Lucid Dreams"	3:59
3.	"Eye Contact (Look Me In My Eyes)"	3:21
4.	"Rainbow"	3:56
5.	"Lost Her"	3:13
6.	"Two Cups (Everything's Going My Way)"	2:32
7.	"Let Me Know (I Wonder Why Freestyle)"	3:35
8.	"Until It's Over (Closure)"	3:37
Total length:		27:12

== Critical reception ==
Professional ratings
Review scores
Source	Rating
RapReviews	5.5

Steve Juon of RapReviews exclaimed 999 is how Juice Wrld gained his "juice".
