= Bandit (Juice Wrld and YoungBoy Never Broke Again song) =

2019 single by Juice Wrld and YoungBoy Never Broke Again

Single by Juice Wrld and YoungBoy Never Broke Again

from the album Death Race for Love
- Released: October 4, 2019
- Genre: Hip hop; trap; punk rap
- Length: 3:09
- Label: Grade A; Interscope
- Songwriters: Jarad Higgins; Kentrell Gaulden; Nick Mira
- Producer: Nick Mira

Juice Wrld singles chronology
"Graduation" (2019)	"Bandit" (2019)	"Let Me Know (I Wonder Why Freestyle)" (2019)

YoungBoy Never Broke Again singles chronology
"Slime Mentality" (2019)	"Bandit" (2019)	"Dirty Iyanna" (2019)

Music video
- "Bandit" on YouTube

"Bandit" is a song by American rappers Juice Wrld and YoungBoy Never Broke Again. Written alongside producer Nick Mira, it was released as a single on October 4, 2019, and is the former's final single as a lead artist during his lifetime. (Note: While "Bandit" was Juice Wrld's final release of new material before his death, Interscope Records had given "Let Me Know (I Wonder Why Freestyle)", a song originally released in 2017 on Juice Wrld's SoundCloud, an official release hours before his death.) It was later added to Juice Wrld's second studio album Death Race for Love as a bonus track.

The song received generally positive reviews from critics and fans alike. While some found YoungBoy's verse less impressive than Juice WRLD's, the track was praised for its catchy melodies, Juice WRLD's unique vocal delivery, and the song's overall energy. The song was particularly celebrated for showcasing Juice WRLD's freestyle ability and his ability to blend somber lyrics with catchy hooks. The song peaked at number ten on the US Billboard Hot 100, becoming NBA YoungBoy's highest-charting single on the chart and Juice Wrld's second top ten single following "Lucid Dreams", which peaked at number two on the Hot 100 in 2018. The artwork, featuring a crossover of Juice Wrld and NBA YoungBoy's likeness beneath a bandana, was created by Max Cohen and Robert Gotham.

== Lyrics ==
The song's lyrics feature Juice Wrld rapping about stealing a girl's heart, calling himself "the definition of a bandit".

== Music video ==
The music video, released on October 4, 2019, was directed by Cole Bennett and features Juice Wrld on a bayou boat ride, during which he holds baby alligators, as well as YoungBoy performing wheelies on a quad bike. It was filmed in YoungBoy's hometown of Baton Rouge, Louisiana and at his residence in Gonzales, Louisiana.

== Charts ==
=== Weekly charts ===
Chart (2019–2020)	Peak position
Australia (ARIA)	45
Austria (Ö3 Austria Top 40)	70
Belgium (Ultratip Bubbling Under Flanders)	22
Canada Hot 100 (Billboard)	11
Czech Republic Singles Digital (ČNS IFPI)	85
Finland (Suomen virallinen lista)	16
Greece (IFPI)	14
Hungary (Stream Top 40)	29
Ireland (IRMA)	30
Latvia (LAIPA)	17
Lithuania (AGATA)	30
Netherlands (Single Top 100)	62
New Zealand (Recorded Music NZ)	40
Norway (VG-lista)	16
Portugal (AFP)	71
Slovakia Singles Digital (ČNS IFPI)	72
Sweden (Sverigetopplistan)	57
Switzerland (Schweizer Hitparade)	58
UK Singles (OCC)	42
US Billboard Hot 100	10
US Hot R&B/Hip-Hop Songs (Billboard)	5
US Hot Rap Songs (Billboard)	4
US Rhythmic Airplay (Billboard)	19
US Rolling Stone Top 100	2

=== Year-end charts ===
Chart (2019)	Position
US Hot R&B/Hip-Hop Songs (Billboard)	82
US Rolling Stone Top 100	87

Chart (2020)	Position
Canada (Canadian Hot 100)	58
US Billboard Hot 100	63
US Hot R&B/Hip-Hop Songs (Billboard)	31

== Certifications ==
Region	Certification	Certified units/sales
Australia (ARIA)	Platinum	70,000^{‡}
Brazil (Pro-Música Brasil)	Platinum	40,000^{‡}
Denmark (IFPI Danmark)	Platinum	90,000^{‡}
Germany (BVMI)	Gold	200,000^{‡}
New Zealand (RMNZ)	2× Platinum	60,000^{‡}
Poland (ZPAV)	Gold	25,000^{‡}
Portugal (AFP)	Platinum	10,000^{‡}
United Kingdom (BPI)	Platinum	600,000^{‡}
United States (RIAA)	6× Platinum	6,000,000^{‡}
^{‡} Sales+streaming figures based on certification alone.

== Release history ==
Region	Date	Format	Label	Ref.
Various	October 4, 2019	Digital download; streaming	Grade A; Interscope	
United States	November 5, 2019	Rhythmic contemporary radio	Grade A; Interscope	
