= Unreleased songs recorded by Juice Wrld =

History of unreleased songs by Juice Wrld

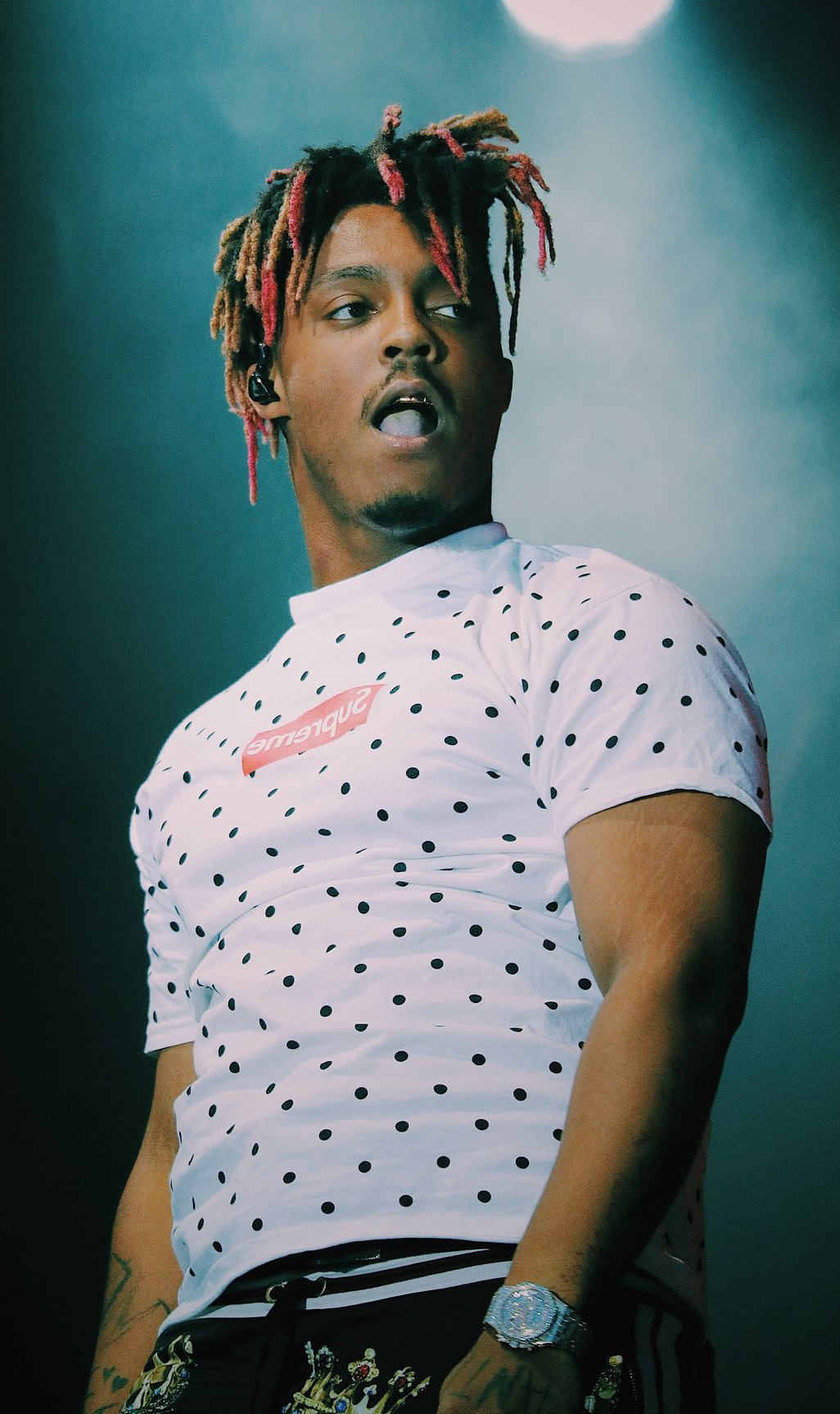
Juice Wrld performing in 2019

Throughout his career, American rapper, singer-songwriter Juice Wrld recorded and produced thousands of songs, with some estimates being around or over 2,000 to 3,000 unreleased songs, with a few hundred of them being rock songs, according to his producer and his manager. Some songs have features from other musical artists. Since Juice Wrld's death, several previously unreleased songs have been released via posthumous albums or singles, such as "Cigarettes" and "Go Hard 2.0".

== History ==
During his lifetime, Juice Wrld, real name Jarad Anthony Higgins, had recorded over 2,000 to 3,000 unreleased songs. According to his manager, Peter Jideonwo, and his producer, some of his songs consisted of rock songs. Juice Wrld worked with several notable artists over the years, including Marshmello and Benny Blanco. Marshmello revealed in a social media post on X that he had eight or nine more songs with Juice Wrld to be released, although he never disclosed the titles of the tracks. In early 2020, Juice Wrld's girlfriend at the time of his passing, Ally Lotti, revealed a snippet of an unreleased song via an Instagram post; in the song, Juice Wrld raps about Lotti and the attachment he had for her. In 2020, it was revealed by Juice Wrld's estate that the thousands of unreleased songs could be turned into another posthumous album. In mid-2020, a 17-year-old was caught leaking songs from major artists, which included Juice Wrld.

When the track "Conversations" was released in early 2021, along with it came a freestyle that was previously unreleased called the "tour bus freestyle", which was played at the end of the music video and went on for two minutes. In mid-2021, a group of leakers created a Discord server where they sold a massive batch of unreleased tracks for around $22,500. Later, a second "groupbuy" was released with another four songs. Juice Wrld's manager Peter Jideonwo made a comment under a post that read "Sad"; the post had the caption "NEW LINK IN BIO LETS GET THIS DONE", which was promoting the unreleased tracks. In 2022, more than 25 tracks were leaked; people took to social media, with someone posting that it "don't feel real lmao." Also in 2022, record producer Zaytoven revealed that there was a collaboration with King Von, Kanye West, and Juice Wrld that was never released. The Verge Magazine listed several unreleased Juice Wrld tracks in their "Top 10 Juice Wrld Songs" list; songs such as "Trifling", "Rob a Bank", ".38 Special", "Off The Rip", and "Cali Girl" were listed.

In addition to his unreleased songs, Juice Wrld also has unreleased freestyles; his freestyle "Fire in the Booth" was previously unreleased but has since been released online. In 2023, Juice Wrld's estate sold a catalog of hundreds of unreleased songs to a company called Opus Music Group, which now owns roughly ninety percent of his share of publishing ownership In 2024, Nicki Minaj released her studio album, The Pinkprint, which featured an unreleased Juice Wrld track titled "Arctic Tundra", which leaked online years prior to its release without Minaj on it. Due to the constant leaking of music, Juice Wrld's posthumous and final album The Party Never Ends was delayed several times; at some point there were also threats from Juice Wrld's management of cancellation of the album. In 2024, following the collaboration with Epic Games in Fortnite, Juice Wrld got his own Fortnite Creative game, which featured unreleased music.

=== Studio albums ===
At the time of his death, he was working on a studio album titled The Outsiders, which was never released due to his overdose on December 8, 2019. After the release of The Party Never Ends, it was revealed that a deluxe version of the album featuring fan-chosen tracks was in the works and planned to be released on January 24, 2025, although it was never released. In 2026, Lil Bibby, the CEO of Grade A Productions, which is the label Juice Wrld was signed under, revealed in an Instagram post that they are actively working on The Outsiders once again.

== Background and controversies ==
Juice Wrld was able to record so many songs during his short-lived career due to his ability to freestyle, with him even freestyling majority of his 23-track studio album Death Race for Love in four days. People such as Young Thug have said that they think Juice Wrld was "the best freestyler in the world". Juice Wrld's mother spoke out in an interview about the leaking of his music, stating that she understands that "you love him," although it's "disrespectful to him." While he was alive, Juice Wrld said that he hoped his music leakers "made enough money for hospital bills" for when he "finds them."

== List ==
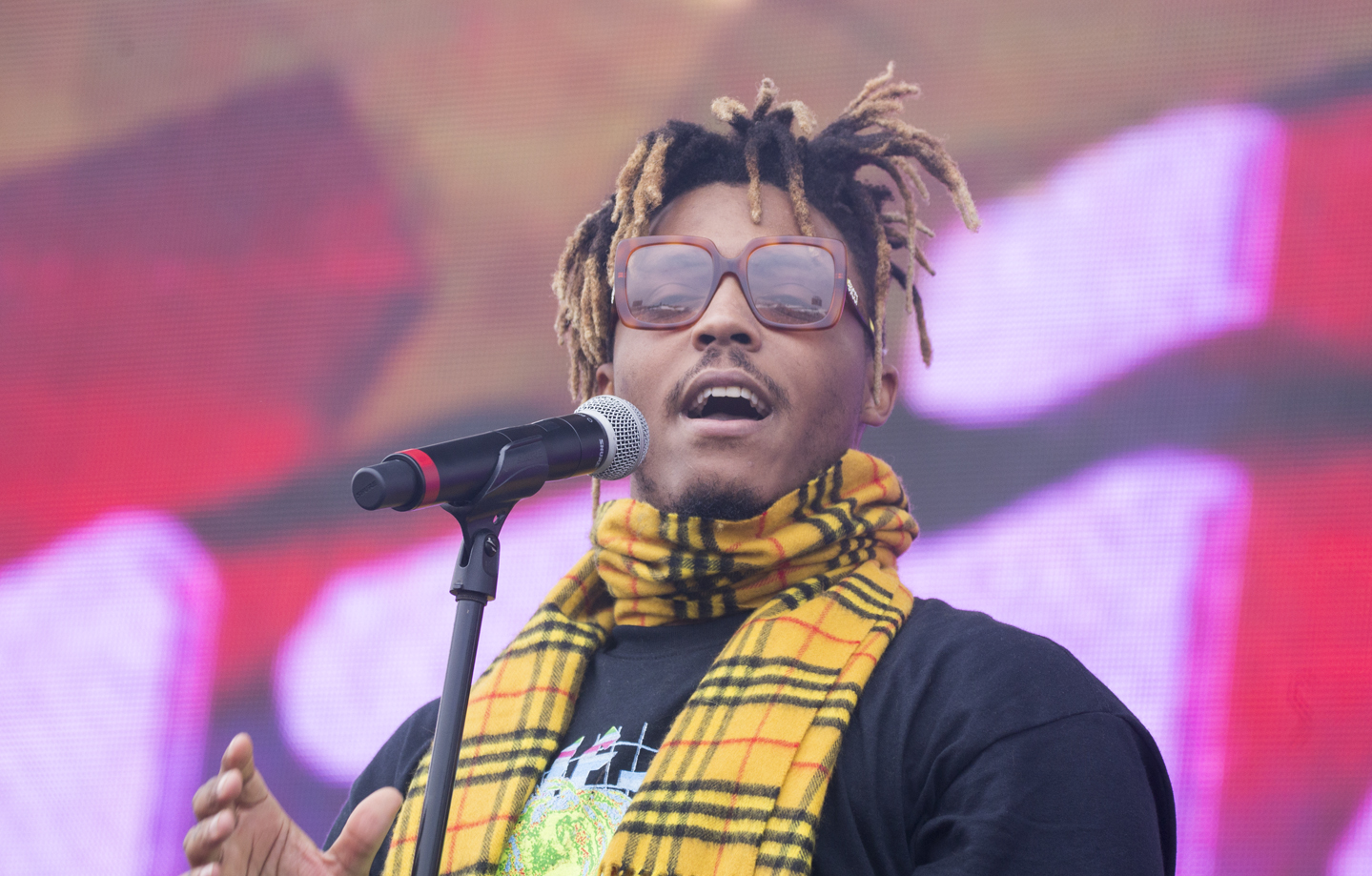
Juice Wrld performing in 2019

The following list only lists leaked songs that are backed with reliable sources
Title	Year leaked	Ref
Hourglass (Lost My Mind)	2026	
Charcoal (Time)	2026	
Fresh Air (Bel-Air)	2026	
Not My Fault (Chasing The Dragon)	2026	
Compromised (feat. Ski Mask the Slump God)	2026	
Last Year (Pokémon)	2026	
Cali Girl Pt. 2	2026	
You’re Not The Boss (Boss of Me)	2022	
Sideshow (Rob a Bank)	2022	
GO GO (.38 Special)	2022	
Off The Rip	2022	
Not That Easy (Codependent)	2022	
Juck (Dome)	2022	
For The Weekend (Facetious) (feat. G Herbo)	2022	
Friends Die (Fuck About Your Feelings)	2022	
Hypnotic	2022	
Ain’t Coming Back (KKK)	2022	
RUNNAWAY FREESTYLE	2022	
Come To Me (Work Out)	2022	
Lonely Road (Survive)	2021	
My Bad	2021	
Trifling (with Lil Yachty)	2020	
Bullet For My Valentine	2018	

== See also ==
- Juice Wrld discography
