= Black & White (Juice Wrld song) =

2018 song by Juice Wrld

Song by Juice Wrld

from the album Goodbye & Good Riddance
- Released: May 23, 2018
- Recorded: 2017–2018
- Genre: Cloud rap; trap
- Length: 3:06
- Label: Grade A; Interscope
- Songwriters: Jarad Higgins; Benjamin Levin; Magnus Høiberg; Alexandra Yatchenko; Justin Tranter; Nathan Perez
- Producers: Benny Blanco; Cashmere Cat

Music video
- "Black & White" on YouTube

"Black & White" is a song by American rapper Juice Wrld. It was released on May 23, 2018, as the sixth track from his debut studio album Goodbye & Good Riddance.

== Composition ==
"Black & White" continues the theme of Goodbye & Good Riddance with an ode to codeine, cocaine, and other addicting drugs.

The track has been used as an anthem to end racism.

== Music video ==
The music video was released on October 3, 2018. The video follows Juice Wrld as he parties nonstop with his friends in a luxurious mansion. Eventually, the rapper passes away in the video and visits his own memorial. The video was directed by R.J. Sanchez and has 237 million views as of December 1 2025.

== Charts ==
Chart (2018)	Peak position
US Bubbling Under Hot 100 (Billboard)	23
US Bubbling Under R&B/Hip-Hop Songs (Billboard)	8

== Certifications ==
Region	Certification	Certified units/sales
Canada (Music Canada)	3× Platinum	240,000^{‡}
New Zealand (RMNZ)	Platinum	30,000^{‡}
United Kingdom (BPI)	Gold	400,000^{‡}
United States (RIAA)	4× Platinum	4,000,000^{‡}
^{‡} Sales+streaming figures based on certification alone.
