= Let Me Know =

Let Me Know may refer to:

== Songs ==
- "Let Me Know" (Róisín Murphy song), 2007
- "Let Me Know" (Tamar Braxton song), 2014
- "Let Me Know" (Towa Tei song), 1999
- "Let Me Know (I Wonder Why Freestyle)", by Juice Wrld, 2017
- "Let Me Know", by After 7, 2016
- "Let Me Know", by BTS from Dark & Wild, 2014
- "Let Me Kkow", by Bun B featuring Tony Sunshine, 2025
- "Let Me Know", by Collie Buddz from Collie Buddz, 2007
- "Let Me Know", by Janet Jackson from Discipline, 2008
- "Let Me Know", by Kiss from Kiss, 1974
- "Let Me Know", by Kodak Black from Back for Everything, 2022
- "Let Me Know", by LANY from Malibu Nights, 2018
- "Let Me Know", by No Wyld, featured in FIFA 16
- "Let Me Know", by Perfume from Future Pop, 2018
- "Let Me Know", by STAYC from Metamorphic, 2024
- "Let Me Know", by Strawberry Milk from The 1st Mini Album, 2014
- "Let Me Know", by Xscape from Hummin' Comin' at 'Cha, 1993
- "Let Me Know (I Have a Right)", by Gloria Gaynor from I Have a Right, 1979
