= Fine china (disambiguation) =

Fine china most often refers to porcelain.

Fine china may also refer to:

- Fine China (band), an American indie rock band
- "Fine China" (Chris Brown song). 2013
- "Fine China" (Future and Juice Wrld song), 2018
