= Wasted (Juice Wrld song) =

2018 single by Juice WRLD featuring Lil Uzi Vert

Single by Juice WRLD featuring Lil Uzi Vert

from the album Goodbye & Good Riddance
- Released: July 10, 2018
- Recorded: April 24, 2018
- Genre: Trap
- Length: 4:18
- Label: Grade A; Interscope
- Songwriters: Jarad Higgins; Symere Woods; Christopher Barnett
- Producer: CB Mix

Juice WRLD singles chronology
"Rich and Blind" / "Legends" (2018)	"Wasted" (2018)	"Fine China" (2018)

Lil Uzi Vert singles chronology
"Watch" (2018)	"Wasted" (2018)	"New Patek" (2018)

"Wasted" is a song by American rapper Juice WRLD featuring fellow American rapper Lil Uzi Vert. It was released on July 10, 2018 before being added to the former's debut studio album Goodbye & Good Riddance, which was released earlier in May 2018 with Uzi as the only feature of the album. It premiered on Apple Music's Beats 1.

== Reception ==
The video game series Grand Theft Auto is referenced in the song, as is its developers, Rockstar Games, as HotNewHipHop described the reference as "a charming play on the message that pops up when you die in Grand Theft Auto" games. The word “wasted” is displayed across the screen whenever a player dies in Grand Theft Auto. Uzi Vert's verse is described as distorted, and stated by Rap-Up as a "rapid-fire verse" on which they reference "molly, hakuna matata, and a dominatrix."

== Composition ==
The meaning of the song is stated as "Juice getting vulnerable about a partner who's trying to 'get closer to Satan' by talking to him 'in the Matrix'" and "tackling the duality of drug culture, one where users are aware of their own demons but keep coming back for one reason or another." The song is described as "melancholic, shoegaze-y and dispirited." It reflects on consuming drugs with girls who make both artists sad. Compared to the musical style of fellow American rapper singer Post Malone, it is noted for its "jaded and new age pop sound." The song consists of a "heavy trap beat."

== Track listing ==
Digital download
No.	Title	Length
1.	"Wasted" (featuring Lil Uzi Vert)	4:18

== Charts ==
Chart (2018)	Peak position
Canada Hot 100 (Billboard)	69
New Zealand Hot Singles (RMNZ)	17
US Billboard Hot 100	67
US Hot R&B/Hip-Hop Songs (Billboard)	27
US Hot Rap Songs (Billboard)	21

== Certifications ==
Certifications for "Wasted"
Region	Certification	Certified units/sales
Australia (ARIA)	Gold	35,000^{‡}
Canada (Music Canada)	3× Platinum	240,000^{‡}
New Zealand (RMNZ)	Platinum	30,000^{‡}
Poland (ZPAV)	Gold	25,000^{‡}
United Kingdom (BPI)	Gold	400,000^{‡}
United States (RIAA)	3× Platinum	3,000,000^{‡}
^{‡} Sales+streaming figures based on certification alone.

== Release history ==
Region	Date	Format	Label	Ref.
Worldwide	July 10, 2018	Digital download	Grade A; Interscope	
