= Wrld on Drugs =

Mixtape by Future and Juice Wrld
- Released: October 19, 2018
- Recorded: 2018
- Genres: Hip-hop, trap
- Length: 49:31
- Labels: Freebandz; Grade A; Epic; Interscope
- Producers: Wheezy (also exec.); Andrew Watt; ATL Jacob; Bobby Raps; Cubeatz; CVRE; Don Cannon; DY; Frank Dukes; Frankie Bash; Happy Perez; Aviator Keyyz; Louis Bell; Murda Beatz; Nikko Bunkin; Oogie Mane; Outtatown; Psymun; Richie Souf; SinGrinch; Trell Got Wings

Future chronology
Beast Mode 2 (2018)	Wrld on Drugs (2018)	The Wizrd (2019)

Juice Wrld chronology
Goodbye & Good Riddance (2018)	Wrld on Drugs (2018)	Death Race for Love (2019)

Singles from Wrld on Drugs
- 1. "Fine China" Released: October 15, 2018

Wrld on Drugs, also known and stylized as Future & Juice WRLD Present... WRLD ON DRUGS is a collaborative commercial mixtape by American rappers Future and Juice Wrld. It was released as a surprise on October 19, 2018, by Epic Records, Freebandz, Grade A and Interscope Records after being originally announced two days prior. The lead single "Fine China" was released on October 15, 2018. The mixtape contains guest appearances from Young Scooter, Young Thug, Lil Wayne, Yung Bans, Gunna, and Nicki Minaj.

== Background ==
After the release of "Fine China", Wrld on Drugs was revealed as a joint project by both Future and Juice Wrld on their social media accounts. The project consists of sixteen songs. A handwritten track list featuring scribbling on a whiteboard was published by both the artists with the caption "Pluto x Juice #WRLDONDRUGS", which refers to Future as Pluto, a reference to Future's debut album Pluto. Future also revealed he and Juice Wrld have worked in the studio on the project, urging the latter to "make the cover artwork, pick the songs and put it out ASAP." He stated "Me & JuiceWorlddd in the studio rite now...we jus did enough heat to drop a tape this week." On the whiteboard, the phrases "whatever you addicted too" and "$$$ is a drug?" were written.

The Source has linked the album's title to the passing of rapper Mac Miller, stating "The title itself is interesting and speaks to the current state of Hip-Hop. With the recent drug-related passing of Pittsburgh rapper Mac Miller, one can wonder whether the project will be open about drug usage or mental illness in the world's biggest genre." HotNewHipHop suggested the drug naming in the song titles suggest there could exist a high number of drug references in the mixtape.

== Singles ==
"Fine China" was released as a single on October 15, 2018. "Fine China" was recorded in July 2018 during a studio session between Future and Juice. Its making-of has been published by the rappers on their Instagram pages. They both visited the desert to shoot a music video for the album's second single, "No Issue".

== Critical reception ==
Professional ratings
Aggregate scores
Source	Rating
Metacritic	61/100
Review scores
Source	Rating
Consequence of Sound	C
Highsnobiety	3/5 stars
HipHopDX	3.7/5
Now	2/5 stars
Pitchfork	6.3/10
RapReviews	6/10
XXL	3/5 stars

Wrld on Drugs was met with mixed to positive reviews from music critics. At Metacritic, which assigns a normalized rating out of 100 to reviews from professional critics, the album received an average score of 61, based on six reviews, indicating "generally favorable reviews".

Daniel Spielberger of HipHopDX said "Over the years, Future’s collaborations have occasionally demonstrated how easy it is for him to be overshadowed. With Wrld on Drugs, however, the Freebandz founder has struck up a natural rapport with a younger trap rapper while creating a unique atmosphere". Torii MacAdams of Pitchfork said "Too often, WRLD on Drugs caters to neither Future nor Juice WRLD's strengths. The teenager became a star not with gnashing street rap but earnestly sung (if naively written) anthems about rejection and endlessly malicious women".

In mixed reviews, XXL writer said "Overall, Wrld on Drugs is a mixed bag. Juice Wrld pushes Future in interesting ways, while growing stylistically himself. When he's not so embittered and combative, Juice's charm shines through". Jesse Bernard of Highsnobiety said "As with all of Future's releases this year, WRLD on Drugs could have benefitted from more precise and careful craftsmanship". RapReviews critic Steve "Flash" Juon said that "the album falls into the same category as so many mainstream charting rap albums (again using the term "rap" loosely) do these days—it's aight but it's not my thing. Do you like lots of bass? "Different" featuring Yung Bans and "No Issue" are guaranteed to vibrate your car. Do you like songs about flossing hard and blowing lots of money? The aforementioned "Red Bentley" and "Make It Back" definitely fit that vibe". Tommy Monroe of Consequence of Sound said "When Juice WRLD is in control, both rappers shine together. ... However, on Future's part, when he isn't outright struggling, he creates a whirlwind of lifeless tracks (especially his solo songs). This contributes to the heap of monotonous songs on the project". Claudia McNeilly of Now said "There are moments of greatness hidden within "Realer N Realer" and "Hard Work Pays Off", which both deliver relaxed, summery beats and glimpses into the emotional, razor-sharp lyricists that Juice and Future can be. But it isn't enough to save the album, which sounds more like an attempt at capitalizing on the artists' fame than the masterpiece it could've been".

== Commercial performance ==
Wrld on Drugs debuted at number two on the US Billboard 200 behind A Star Is Born by Lady Gaga and Bradley Cooper, with 98,000 album-equivalent units, which included 8,000 pure album sales. It serves as Future's tenth top-ten album in the United States, and Juice Wrld's second. The album dropped to the number eight in its second week, earning an additional 45,000 album-equivalent units.

== Track listing ==
Credits adapted from Tidal.

No.	Title	Writer(s)	Producer(s)	Length
1.	"Jet Lag" (featuring Young Scooter)	Nayvadius Wilburn; Jarad Higgins; Kenneth Bailey; Andrew Wotman; Louis Bell; Carl Rosen	Andrew Watt; Bell	4:31
2.	"Astronauts"	Wilburn; Higgins; Wesley Glass; Robert Richardson	Wheezy; Bobby Raps	2:49
3.	"Fine China"	Wilburn; Higgins; Glass; Simon Christensen; Corey French	Wheezy; Psymun; SinGrinch	2:21
4.	"Red Bentley" (featuring Young Thug)	Wilburn; Higgins; Jeffery Williams; Shane Lindstrom	Murda Beatz	3:27
5.	"Make It Back" (performed by Juice Wrld)	Higgins; Glass; Jun Ha Kim; Adam Feeney	Wheezy; CVRE; Frank Dukes^{[a]}	1:42
6.	"Oxy" (performed by Future featuring Lil Wayne)	Wilburn; Dwayne Carter Jr.; Tony Son	Richie Souf	3:00
7.	"7AM Freestyle"	Wilburn; Higgins; Glass	Wheezy	3:12
8.	"Different" (featuring Yung Bans)	Wilburn; Higgins; Vas Coleman; Glass; Kevin Gomringer; Tim Gomringer	Wheezy; Cubeatz	2:31
9.	"Shorty"	Wilburn; Higgins; Glass; Tobias Dekker; Keyshawn Gilmore	Wheezy; Aviator Keyyz^{[b]}; Outtatown^{[b]}	2:01
10.	"Realer N Realer"	Wilburn; Higgins; Glass; Colin Franken	Wheezy; Frankie Bash^{[a]}	2:50
11.	"No Issue"	Wilburn; Higgins; Glass; Rosie Lowe	Wheezy	3:04
12.	"WRLD On Drugs"	Wilburn; Higgins; Brandon Wright; Donald Cannon; Jordan Ortiz; Basil Beyah	Oogie Mane; Don Cannon; BHUNNA^{[b]}	3:37
13.	"Afterlife" (performed by Future)	Wilburn; Glass; Dwan Avery	Wheezy; DY	3:34
14.	"Ain't Livin' Right" (featuring Gunna)	Wilburn; Higgins; Sergio Kitchens; Hudson	Trell Got Wings; Nikko Bunkin^{[b]}	3:50
15.	"Transformer" (performed by Future featuring Nicki Minaj)	Wilburn; Onika Maraj; Jacob Canady	ATL Jacob	3:16
16.	"Hard Work Pays Off"	Wilburn; Higgins; Wotman; Bell; Nathan Perez; Rosen	Watt; Happy Perez; Bell	3:44
Total length:				49:31

Notes

- ^{^[a]} signifies a co-producer
- ^{^[b]} signifies an uncredited co-producer

== Personnel ==
Credits adapted from Tidal.

- Şerban Ghenea – mixing (tracks 1, 16)
- Alex Tumay – mixing (tracks 2–15)
- Joe LaPorta – mastering (all tracks)
- John Hanes – assistant engineering (tracks 1, 16)

== Charts ==
=== Weekly charts ===
Chart (2018–2019)	Peak position
Australian Albums (ARIA)	28
Austrian Albums (Ö3 Austria)	44
Belgian Albums (Ultratop Flanders)	34
Belgian Albums (Ultratop Wallonia)	133
Canadian Albums (Billboard)	5
Danish Albums (Hitlisten)	18
Dutch Albums (Album Top 100)	12
Finnish Albums (Suomen virallinen lista)	36
French Albums (SNEP)	85
German Albums (Offizielle Top 100)	87
Irish Albums (IRMA)	24
Italian Albums (FIMI)	86
New Zealand Albums (RMNZ)	28
Norwegian Albums (VG-lista)	11
Swedish Albums (Sverigetopplistan)	17
Swiss Albums (Schweizer Hitparade)	54
UK Albums (Official Charts)	23
US Billboard 200	2
US Top R&B/Hip-Hop Albums (Billboard)	1

=== Year-end charts ===
Chart (2019)	Position
US Billboard 200	170
US Top R&B/Hip-Hop Albums (Billboard)	77

== Certifications ==
Region	Certification	Certified units/sales
Canada (Music Canada)	Platinum	80,000^{‡}
Denmark (IFPI Danmark)	Gold	10,000^{‡}
New Zealand (RMNZ)	Gold	7,500^{‡}
United Kingdom (BPI)	Silver	60,000^{‡}
United States (RIAA)	Platinum	1,000,000^{‡}
^{‡} Sales+streaming figures based on certification alone.
