= All Girls Are the Same =

2018 debut single by Juice Wrld

Single by Juice Wrld

from the album Goodbye & Good Riddance
- Released: December 22, 2017
- Recorded: December 14, 2017
- Genre: Emo rap; cloud rap
- Length: 2:45
- Label: Grade A; Interscope
- Songwriters: Jarad Higgins; Nick Mira; Danny Snodgrass Jr.
- Producer: Nick Mira

Juice Wrld singles chronology
"All Girls Are the Same" (2018)	"Lucid Dreams" (2018)

Music video
- "All Girls Are the Same" on YouTube

"All Girls Are the Same" (alternatively stylized in all caps) is the debut single by American rapper Juice Wrld. It was released as the lead single from his debut studio album, Goodbye & Good Riddance on April 13, 2018, after its music video premiered in February. Produced by Nick Mira, the song debuted at number 92 on the Billboard Hot 100 and peaked at number 41. It was Juice's second song to reach one billion streams on Spotify, after "Lucid Dreams" in December 2019. "AGATS2 (Insecure)", featuring Trinidadian rapper Nicki Minaj, was released on November 15, 2024 as a single from Juice's final album The Party Never Ends, and serves as a sequel.

== Lyrics ==
The track centers around how women in Juice Wrld's past relationships have left him heartbroken with their deceit and that he drinks hard liquor to cope with the emotional turmoil.

The composition is broken into a repeating sequence of rapped verses on Juice Wrld's personal issues, with a refrain using 'same' rhymes, and circling back to the song's title numerous times. A fading-in intro similar to that of "Lucid Dreams" begins the song's lyrics.

== Music video ==
The official music video was directed by Cole Bennett, and was released on February 25, 2018.

== Remix ==
The official remix of the song features American rapper Lil Yachty, who first previewed the collaboration on Instagram in late March 2018. Juice Wrld posted another snippet on Instagram on May 6. On June 25, when Lil Yachty uploaded it on SoundCloud, it was swiftly deleted due to copyright issues. Some fans - during the brief time it was available - were able to download it and it has since been available on YouTube.

== Charts ==
=== Weekly charts ===
Weekly chart performance
Chart (2018–2025)	Peak position
Australia (ARIA)	98
Global 200 (Billboard)	173
Canada Hot 100 (Billboard)	54
Greece (IFPI)	69
Poland (Polish Streaming Top 100)	100
Portugal (AFP)	39
Sweden Heatseeker (Sverigetopplistan)	3
UK Singles (Official Charts)	53
UK Hip Hop/R&B (Official Charts)	16
US Billboard Hot 100	41
US Hot R&B/Hip-Hop Songs (Billboard)	20
US Rolling Stone Top 100	35

=== Year-end charts ===
Annual chart rankings
Chart (2018)	Position
US Hot R&B/Hip-Hop Songs (Billboard)	55
US Streaming Songs (Billboard)	60

== Certifications ==
Region	Certification	Certified units/sales
Australia (ARIA)	2× Platinum	140,000^{‡}
Austria (IFPI Austria)	Platinum	30,000^{‡}
Brazil (Pro-Música Brasil)	2× Platinum	80,000^{‡}
Canada (Music Canada)	8× Platinum	640,000^{‡}
Denmark (IFPI Danmark)	Platinum	90,000^{‡}
Germany (BVMI)	Gold	200,000^{‡}
Italy (FIMI)	Gold	50,000^{‡}
New Zealand (RMNZ)	4× Platinum	120,000^{‡}
Nigeria (TCSN)	Silver	25,000^{‡}
Poland (ZPAV)	2× Platinum	100,000^{‡}
Portugal (AFP)	Platinum	10,000^{‡}
Spain (Promusicae)	Gold	30,000^{‡}
United Kingdom (BPI)	2× Platinum	1,200,000^{‡}
United States (RIAA)	8× Platinum	8,000,000^{‡}
Streaming
Greece (IFPI Greece)	Gold	1,000,000^{†}
^{‡} Sales+streaming figures based on certification alone.^{†} Streaming-only figures based on certification alone.
