= Legends (Juice Wrld song) =

- The cover for the EP shows an Instagram direct message (DM) conversation between XXXTentacion and Juice Wrld.

Single by Juice Wrld

from the EP Too Soon.. and the album Fighting Demons (Deluxe)
- B-side: "Rich and Blind"
- Released: June 19, 2018
- Recorded: June 18, 2018
- Genre: Emo rap
- Length: 3:12
- Label: Grade A; Interscope
- Songwriters: Denzel Baptiste; David Biral; Jarad Higgins
- Producers: Russell Chell; Take A Daytrip

Juice Wrld singles chronology
"Lean wit Me" (2018)	"Rich and Blind" / "Legends" (2018)	"Wasted" (2018)

"Legends" is a song by American rapper Juice Wrld. It was released as the second single from his EP Too Soon.. on June 22, 2018, three days after the EP's release. The song is an homage to two deceased rappers – Lil Peep, who died by overdose on November 15, 2017, and XXXTentacion who, an inspiration of Juice Wrld, was murdered on June 18, 2018. After his death in 2019, the song's lyrics were re-contextualized by critics and fans as a prediction of his own fate.

== Background ==
The song is dedicated to Lil Peep, who died from a drug overdose in November 2017, and XXXTentacion, who was murdered the day before Too Soon..'s release.

After Juice Wrld died from a drug overdose on December 8, 2019, at the age of 21, the song gained further notoriety due to the lyric, "What's the 27 Club? / We ain't making it past 21."

The song initially peaked at 65 in 2018. However, following Juice Wrld's death, the song re-entered the chart and peaked at 29 on the US Billboard Hot 100 on the chart dated December 21, 2019.

"Legends", alongside "Rich and Blind", the other song on the two-track EP they came from, were later added to Juice Wrld's second posthumous album Fighting Demons on March 18, 2022, alongside the newly released song "Sometimes".

== Charts ==
Chart (2018–2019)	Peak position
Australia (ARIA)	97
Canada Hot 100 (Billboard)	26
Estonia (IFPI)	39
Greece (IFPI)	30
Ireland (IRMA)	46
Portugal (AFP)	96
UK Singles (Official Charts)	98
US Billboard Hot 100	29
US Hot R&B/Hip-Hop Songs (Billboard)	13
US Rolling Stone Top 100	18

== Certifications ==
Region	Certification	Certified units/sales
Australia (ARIA)	Gold	35,000^{‡}
Brazil (Pro-Música Brasil)	Platinum	40,000^{‡}
Canada (Music Canada)	Gold	40,000^{‡}
Denmark (IFPI Danmark)	Gold	45,000^{‡}
New Zealand (RMNZ)	Platinum	30,000^{‡}
Poland (ZPAV)	Gold	25,000^{‡}
United Kingdom (BPI)	Gold	400,000^{‡}
United States (RIAA)	2× Platinum	2,000,000^{‡}
^{‡} Sales+streaming figures based on certification alone.
