= Juice Wrld: Into the Abyss =

2021 documentary film about Juice WRLD

- Official release poster
- Directed by: Tommy Oliver
- Produced by: Keith Gionet; Tommy Oliver; Carmela Wallace
- Starring: Juice WRLD (archival footage); Ally Lotti; Cole Bennett; Benny Blanco; DJ Scheme; G Herbo; Hit-Boy; iLoveMakonnen; The Kid Laroi; Lil Bibby; Polo G; Rex Kudo; Ski Mask the Slump God
- Cinematography: Tommy Oliver
- Edited by: Joe Kehoe; Tommy Oliver
- Music by: Juice Wrld
- Production companies: HBO Documentary Films; Grade A Films; Confluential Films; Ringer Films
- Distributed by: HBO
- Release dates: November 12, 2021 (AFI Fest); December 16, 2021
- Country: United States
- Language: English

Juice WRLD: Into the Abyss is a 2021 documentary film, directed by Tommy Oliver. Focusing on the life and death of rapper Juice Wrld, the documentary is the sixth and final part of the HBO Max documentary series Music Box. It premiered at the AFI Fest on November 12, 2021, where it won the AFI Fest Documentary Audience Award, and it officially debuted on December 16, 2021, with an exclusive preview at the Juice Wrld Day event held at Chicago's United Center on December 9.

== Cast ==
All star as themselves.

- Juice WRLD (archival footage)
- Ally Lotti - Instagram Model
- Cole Bennett - Videographer/Director
- Benny Blanco - Producer
- Chris Long - Videographer/Photographer
- DJ Scheme - Producer/Artist
- G Herbo - Artist
- iLoveMakonnen - Artist
- The Kid Laroi - Artist and Mentee to Juice Wrld
- Lil Bibby - Grade A Productions Lead / Artist
- Polo G - Artist
- Rex Kudo - Producer
- Ski Mask the Slump God - Artist
- D-Savage - Artist
- Cordae - Artist

== Production ==
Shot, edited, and produced by Oliver, the documentary contains footage from Juice's last years, and contains appearances from numerous friends and family of his, including his protégé The Kid Laroi, girlfriend Ally Lotti, and manager Lil Bibby. It also features numerous frequent collaborators of Juice's, including rappers Ski Mask the Slump God, Polo G, and G Herbo, producers Benny Blanco, Rex Kudo, and Hit-Boy, and music video director Cole Bennett.

== Release ==
Into the Abyss premiered at the AFI Fest on November 12, 2021, where it won the AFI Fest Documentary Audience Award, and it officially debuted on December 16, 2021, with an exclusive preview at the Juice Wrld Day event held at Chicago's United Center on December 9.

The documentary's release was preceded by the release of Juice's fourth studio album and second to be released posthumously, Fighting Demons. The first single from the album, "Already Dead", was released to streaming services on November 12, 2021. The album was officially released by Juice's labels, Grade A and Interscope Records on December 10, 2021.

== Critical response ==
The film received mostly positive reviews from critics. Conversely, film critic Steve Pulaski of Influx Magazine gave the film a negative review, saying, "Into the Abyss is perhaps the grimiest documentary that could be made about the late Chicago legend. Sloppy editing is one thing, but to show intimate footage of the 21-year-old artist’s spiral into addiction in such an uncritical way feels especially cruel."

== See also ==
- Everybody's Everything (film)
- Look at Me (2022 film)
- Juice Wrld
