= Lean wit Me =

Single by Juice Wrld

from the album Goodbye & Good Riddance
- Released: May 23, 2018
- Recorded: March 27, 2018
- Studio: Glass Tree Creative Recording Studios
- Genre: Emo rap
- Length: 2:56; 4:01 (music video)
- Label: Grade A; Interscope
- Songwriters: Jarad Higgins; Nick Mira; Danny Snodgrass Jr.
- Producer: Nick Mira

Juice Wrld singles chronology
"Lucid Dreams" (2018)	"Lean wit Me" (2018)	"Rich and Blind" / "Legends" (2018)

Audio sample
- file; help

Music video
- "Lean wit Me" on YouTube

"Lean wit Me" is a song by American rapper Juice Wrld. Written alongside producer Nick Mira, it was released as the third single from Goodbye & Good Riddance, a day ahead of the album's release on May 23, 2018.

Upon its release, "Lean wit Me" received positive reviews from contemporary music critics. In the United States, it peaked at number 68 on the U.S. Billboard Hot 100 chart. The single has since been certified quintuple platinum by the RIAA. An accompanying music video was directed by Sherif Alabede and depicts Juice Wrld's long battle with drug addiction alongside his girlfriend. It ends with a message promoting the National Drug and Alcohol Treatment Hotline (1-800-662-4357).

== Background ==
"Lean wit Me" serves as the third single from debut studio album Goodbye & Good Riddance. As one of the more personal tracks on the album, the song is a reflection on addiction, addressing Juice Wrld's issues with substance abuse. Unlike other tracks on the album, it does not celebrate substance abuse, instead serving as a cautionary tale to the listener.

== Composition ==
"Lean wit Me" is a midtempo emo rap track that lasts for a duration of two minutes and fifty-five seconds. It is an agonizing melodic rap song. The songwriting contains dark lyrical themes, with a strong fixation on addiction and contemplations of mortality. The lyrics include references pertaining to narcotics, binging and needing therapy after a girlfriend overdoses: "Finally know the difference between love and drugs". As the lyrical narrative unfolds, Juice Wrld suffers from the consequences of his overindulgence." Throughout the musical composition, his melodic vocal style often verges on melancholic crooning.

== Critical reception ==
"Lean wit Me" received positive reviews from contemporary music journalists. Aaron Williams for Uproxx complimented Juice Wrld's lyricism, claiming that the songwriter "details substance abuse that could make Future think twice about his decisions."

== Chart performance ==
In the United States, "Lean wit Me" made its first chart appearance on the Billboard Hot 100, debuting at number 87 on August 17, 2018, with 10.9 million U.S. streams and 1,000 digital downloads. That very same week, the single entered at number 44 on the Hot R&B/Hip-Hop Songs chart. The next week, "Lean wit Me" climbed three places to reach number 84 on the Billboard Hot 100 chart. In the end, the song ascended to its peak position at number 68 on the Hot 100 for the issue dated September 1, 2018, which was its third week on the chart. It eventually peaked at number 26 on the Hot R&B/Hip-Hop Songs chart for the issue dated September 1, 2018. "Lean wit Me" entered and peaked at number 21 on the US Hot Rap Songs chart. In Canada, the song debuted at number 93 on the Canadian Hot 100 chart, where it reached number 79. On December 11, 2018, "Lean wit Me" was certified Platinum by the Recording Industry Association of America (RIAA) for sales of one million paid digital downloads. As of 2024, the music video has over 250 million views.

== Music video ==
=== Background ===
The accompanying music video for "Lean wit Me" was directed by Los Angeles filmmaker Sherif Alabede. Known for his narrative-driven visuals, Aladebe has a signature aesthetic that aims to leave a lasting impression on audiences. Juice Wrld and Alabede sought to create a dark, gritty video which provided a cautionary tale regarding the consequences of recreational drug use. The video features Juice Wrld attending a group therapy session. Alabede admitted that he was not familiar with Juice Wrld's musical style prior to being contacted to direct the video. However, he was informed of Juice Wrld's emo rap approach and was impressed by his authenticity. An Alcoholics Anonymous meeting was used to frame the visual narrative. The extras included in the video were actual recovering alcoholics.

=== Synopsis ===
A screenshot of Juice Wrld attending a twelve-step program group therapy session in the music video for "Lean wit Me".

The music video opens with Juice Wrld at a twelve-step program meeting. He takes part in saying a Serenity Prayer in unison with the group and sits on a metal folding chair in a circle. The group leader requests the artist introduce himself and share his story, which segues into the song. Juice sings his backstory as he dances around the circle. It is revealed that his character found his way to therapy following the death of his girlfriend. Throughout the video, there are shifts between segments of Juice Wrld at the meeting and flashback scenes where he was with his girlfriend. The couple both revel in the ecstasy of substance abuse and struggle with their addiction. They are depicted in various states of dependency, from laying on the floor surrounded by pills to getting arrested in a convenience store. It culminates with Juice Wrld calling 911 to report that his girlfriend has overdosed on prescription drugs. The music video ends on a black screen with a message promoting the National Drug and Alcohol Treatment Hotline. It reads: "RIP to too many young legends that left us early. If you or somebody you know is suffering from addiction call 1-800-662-HELP to take the first step." Tragically, Juice Wrld himself died from an overdose a year later.

=== Reception ===
Upon its release, the music video was met with general acclaim praised for its dark imagery. Aaron Williams from Uproxx stated that with the video, Juice Wrld delivered a harrowing statement on substance abuse. Tosten Burks of XXL Magazine claimed, "The clip's tone and stakes match the self-destruction in Juice's writing."

== Personnel ==
Credits adapted from Tidal.

- Juice Wrld – writing
- Nick Mira – writing, production

== Charts ==
Chart performance for "Lean wit Me"
Chart (2018–2019)	Peak position
Canada Hot 100 (Billboard)	72
Greece International (IFPI)	100
Sweden Heatseeker (Sverigetopplistan)	20
US Billboard Hot 100	68
US Hot R&B/Hip-Hop Songs (Billboard)	26
US Hot Rap Songs (Billboard)	21
US Rolling Stone Top 100	68

== Certifications ==
Certifications for "Lean wit Me"
Region	Certification	Certified units/sales
Australia (ARIA)	Gold	35,000^{‡}
Austria (IFPI Austria)	Gold	15,000^{‡}
Brazil (Pro-Música Brasil)	Gold	20,000^{‡}
Canada (Music Canada)	5× Platinum	400,000^{‡}
Denmark (IFPI Danmark)	Platinum	90,000^{‡}
New Zealand (RMNZ)	2× Platinum	60,000^{‡}
Poland (ZPAV)	Gold	25,000^{‡}
Portugal (AFP)	Gold	5,000^{‡}
United Kingdom (BPI)	Platinum	600,000^{‡}
United States (RIAA)	5× Platinum	5,000,000^{‡}
^{‡} Sales+streaming figures based on certification alone.
