= Let Me Know (I Wonder Why Freestyle) =

2019 single by Juice Wrld

Single by Juice Wrld

from the EP JuiceWrld 9 9 9
- Released: December 7, 2019
- Recorded: June 13, 2017
- Studio: Enviyon Studios, Country Club Hills
- Genre: Experimental hip hop; cloud rap; emo rap
- Length: 3:35
- Label: Grade A; Interscope
- Songwriter: Jarad Higgins
- Producer: Nick Mira

Juice Wrld singles chronology
"Bandit" (2019)	"Let Me Know (I Wonder Why Freestyle)" (2019)	"Godzilla" (2020)

"Let Me Know (I Wonder Why Freestyle)" is a song by American rapper Juice Wrld, first released for his EP JuiceWrld 9 9 9 (2017). Due to its viral spread on TikTok and the growing popularity of its artist, the song was re-released by Grade A Productions and Interscope Records on December 7, 2019. It was the last song released by Juice Wrld before his death a day later, and is featured on the soundtrack of the video game NBA 2K21.

== Composition ==
The song features "foreboding bass tones emblematic of Chicago's drill scene", accompanying Juice Wrld lamenting a girl who left him, while also asking about her and hoping she will come back to him.

== Charts ==
Chart (2019–20)	Peak position
Canada Hot 100 (Billboard)	73
New Zealand Hot Singles (RMNZ)	14
US Billboard Hot 100	78
US Hot R&B/Hip-Hop Songs (Billboard)	30

== Certifications ==
Region	Certification	Certified units/sales
New Zealand (RMNZ)	Platinum	30,000^{‡}
Poland (ZPAV)	Gold	25,000^{‡}
United Kingdom (BPI)	Silver	200,000^{‡}
United States (RIAA)	Gold	500,000^{‡}
^{‡} Sales+streaming figures based on certification alone.
