= Nick Mira =

American record producer (born 2000)

- Born: August 25, 2000 (age 26); Richmond, Virginia, U.S.
- Genre: Alternative hip-hop
- Occupations: Record producer, songwriter
- Years active: 2016–present
- Labels: Internet Money; 10K; Caroline; MiraTouch

Nicholas Warren Mira (born August 25, 2000) is an American record producer. He is the lead member of the record label Internet Money Records, which he co-founded in 2015, with fellow producer Taz Taylor. He worked with American rapper Juice Wrld to produce the songs "Lucid Dreams", "Robbery", "Bandit", and "Lean wit Me". He also worked with rapper Lil Tecca to produce his 2019 single "Ransom," and co-produced Internet Money's 2020 single "Lemonade." Mira released his first collaborative album with the label, B4 the Storm (2020), to positive reception.

== Early life ==
As a child, Mira played the guitar and later learned to play the piano. He began to focus on producing at the age of 13, and he cites Pharrell Williams as an influence. Mira describes his musical style as "melodic" and "ambient". He graduated from James River High School in 2019. Initially, Mira had held the goal of becoming a producer by selling his beats as if they were standalone tracks, but noted that he had very little knowledge about selling music.

== Career ==
Mira met producers Taz Taylor and DT through a Twitch stream in 2016, forming relationships with them based on their common method of selling and promoting their beats on platforms such as YouTube and SoundCloud. The trio co-founded a collective label that would become Internet Money, whose mission is to bring awareness to lesser known producers while uniting them with potential collaborators and artists.

While Mira began his producing career by primarily selling beats online, he has noted that his methods have changed over time, stating that creating a "good time and vibe" removes pressure from the creation of music.

In 2017, Mira, along with Taylor and Dex Duncan, produced XXXTentacion's Trippie Redd-featured single "Fuck Love". It entered at number 41 on the US Billboard Hot 100 and peaked at number 28 after X's death. As of March 29, 2019, the song is one of the most streamed songs on the streaming platform SoundCloud with 206 million streams. Mira began working with Chicago rapper Jarad Higgins, known professionally as Juice Wrld, in 2016 through their mutual friend and fellow producer Sidepce, also known as DT. Mira stated at the time that he believed the rapper "had like 300 followers on SoundCloud". Mira began to send beats to Juice Wrld online, and landed production credits on his singles "All Girls Are the Same," "Lucid Dreams," "Lean Wit Me," "I'm Still, Candles," "Used To," "Hurt Me," "End Of the Road," and "I'll Be Fine" from his 2018 debut album Goodbye and Good Riddance. "Lucid Dreams" peaked at number two on the Billboard Hot 100, has sold over 14 million certified units worldwide and is certified 12x platinum by the Recording Industry Association of America.

He was accused of plagiarizing "Lean wit Me" (performed by Juice Wrld), which he denied and later demonstrated the production of the song through a video published by his Internet Money record label on YouTube. Mira said "I created Juice Wrld's 'Lean Wit Me' beat from scratch. I played the guitar live in the beat, I programmed the drums and then I sent the beat for Juice to record to and make the song — just like how we always do."

In April 2018, Mira and Taylor signed Internet Money to a joint-venture distribution deal with Alamo and Interscope Records.

Mira and Juice Wrld's working relationship continued on the 2019 commercial project Death Race for Love. After the success of Goodbye and Good Riddance, Mira continued to frequently create and send collections of beats to the rapper, and estimated that the duo had over 100 unreleased songs in 2019. Mira noted that the project represented a step forward in both Juice Wrld's and Mira's artistry, and attributed the development of their sound to the experience they had gained by working with each other. He also credited hardcore rock bands as influences for the album's sound. On March 8, 2019, Death Race for Love was released, on which Mira contributed production for four tracks, including the songs "Empty" and "Robbery". The album reached number one on the Billboard 200 chart on March 14, 2019, with first-week sales of 165,000 album equivalents sold. In 2019, he produced Lil Tecca's "Ransom" with Taylor, which peaked at number four on the Billboard Hot 100. Later that year, he worked with Post Malone on his song "On the Road" (featuring Meek Mill and Lil Baby) from his album Hollywood's Bleeding (2019), peaking at number 22 on the Billboard Hot 100.

In 2020, Mira produced several songs on Juice WRLD's first posthumous album, Legends Never Die, including "Smile" with the Weeknd, and Tell Me U Luv Me, which was included in an updated version of the album in August 2020. Mira also produced tracks for other artists including "Lemonade", a collaboration with Gunna featuring Don Toliver and Nav, produced and released with Internet Money. The track later become a hit single worldwide, peaking at number one in the United Kingdom and the top ten of the Hot 100.

Also in 2020, Mira contributed to the production of ten songs on the collaborative Internet Money album B4 the Storm, which peaked at number one on the US Billboard 200 chart. The album included frequent collaborators Lil Tecca, TyFontaine, and 24kGoldn, all of whom Mira continued to produce for.

== Musical style ==
While Mira has generally created beats for hip-hop artists, he has ventured into other styles and genres as well, and has produced on Machine Gun Kelly's pop-punk album Tickets to My Downfall. Mira has described his production style as "melodic", "dynamic", and "spacious". He has credited inspiration to artists Pharrell Williams, Ye, Metro Boomin, Lex Luger, and Sonny Digital, who have each made a significant impact on hip-hop production.

Influence

Along with other fellow Internet Money members, Mira has been credited by some with the rise in popularity of "type beats", which aim to increase the popularity of an instrumental by associating it with popular artists. While this has received some controversy around Internet Money's marketing methods, Mira has explained that his creative process is focused mainly on what he finds appealing, and that the "type beat" method used to tag artists is only based on artists he feels would fit on his instrumental.

As someone who began producing at a young age, Mira has commented on the popularity of Digital Audio Workstation software among the youth population, stating that "producing is the new video game."

Mira has advocated for the importance of working with smaller, up-and-coming artists, in order to build their fan bases and allow them to grow along with the Internet Money label. He has also discussed the value of working with artists in the studio as opposed to virtually, regardless of the size or success of the artist.

== Production discography ==
=== Charted songs ===
Title	Year	Peak chart positions					Album
Title	Year	US	US R&B/HH	AUS	CAN	UK	Album
"Fuck Love" (XXXTentacion featuring Trippie Redd)	2017	28	18	—	31	89	17
"All Girls Are the Same" (Juice Wrld)	2018	41	20	98	54	79	Nothings Different and Goodbye & Good Riddance
"Lucid Dreams" (Juice Wrld)	2018	2	1	8	4	10	9 9 9 and Goodbye & Good Riddance
"Lean wit Me" (Juice Wrld)	2018	68	26	—	72	—	Goodbye & Good Riddance
"Robbery" (Juice Wrld)	2019	27	13	41	22	39	Death Race for Love
"Empty" (Juice Wrld)	2019	41	18	—	58	—	Death Race for Love
"Flaws & Sins" (Juice Wrld)	2019	91	39	—	—	—	Death Race for Love
"That's a Rack" (Lil Uzi Vert)	2019	76	27	—	77	—	Non-album single
"Make Up" (Poorstacy)	2019	—	—	—	—	—	I Don't Care
"Ransom" (Lil Tecca)	2019	4	2	8	2	7	We Love You Tecca
"Did It Again" (Lil Tecca)	2019	64	24	—	34	84	We Love You Tecca
"Just How It Is" (Young Thug)	2019	60	23	—	—	—	So Much Fun
"Shots" (Lil Tecca)	2019	84	35	—	54	—	We Love You Tecca
"On the Road" (Post Malone featuring Meek Mill and Lil Baby)	2019	22	13	35	22	—	Hollywood's Bleeding
"Bandit" (Juice Wrld and YoungBoy Never Broke Again)	2019	10	5	45	11	42	Non-album single
"Somebody" (Internet Money featuring Lil Tecca and A Boogie wit da Hoodie)	2019	96	44	—	54	75	B4 the Storm
"Love Me More" (Trippie Redd)	2019	79	37	—	100	—	A Love Letter to You 4
"6 Kiss" (Trippie Redd featuring Juice Wrld and YNW Melly)	2019	60	28	—	64	—	A Love Letter to You 4
"Let Me Know (I Wonder Why Freestyle)" (Juice Wrld)	2019	78	34	—	73	—	9 9 9
"Might Not Give Up" (A Boogie wit da Hoodie featuring Young Thug)	2020	66	32	—	—	—	Artist 2.0
"Righteous" (Juice Wrld)	2020	11	8	15	9	26	Legends Never Die
"Tell Me U Luv Me" (Juice Wrld and Trippie Redd)	2020	38	15	51	40	56	Legends Never Die
"Fighting Demons" (Juice Wrld)	2020	35	21	—	42	—	Legends Never Die
"Screw Juice" (Juice Wrld)	2020	46	25	—	52	—	Legends Never Die
"Smile" (Juice Wrld and The Weeknd)	2020	8	5	8	7	23	Legends Never Die
"Lemonade" (Internet Money and Gunna featuring Don Toliver and Nav)	2020	6	3	5	3	1	B4 the Storm
"Already Dead" (Juice Wrld)	2021	20	6	29	14	25	Fighting Demons
"Feline" (Juice Wrld, Polo G and Trippie Redd)	2021	56	13	86	54	—	Fighting Demons
"Relocate" (Juice Wrld)	2021	87	29	—	85	—	Fighting Demons
"From My Window" (Juice Wrld)	2021	86	28	—	82	—	Fighting Demons
"Juice Wrld Did" (DJ Khaled featuring Juice Wrld)	2022	55	16	—	56	—	God Did

== Production credits ==
=== 2017 ===
==== XXXTentacion - 17 ====
- 8. "Fuck Love" (featuring Trippie Redd) (produced with Taz Taylor and Dex Duncan)

==== Killa Fonic - Lama Crima ====
- 6. "Aka" (featuring Super ED, Nane and O.G. EastBull)

==== Devin Vegas - No Remorse 2 ====
- 9. "Active" (produced with The Martianz)

=== 2018 ===
==== Lil Skies - Life of a Dark Rose ====
- 1. "Welcome to the Rodeo" (produced with Taz Taylor and Mono Beats)
- 12. "Strictly Business" (produced with Taz Taylor and Menoh Beats)

==== Hella Sketchy - Stupid ====
- 1. "Stupid"

==== Tory Lanez - Love Me Now? ====
- 1. "IF iT Ain'T rIGHt" (featuring A Boogie wit da Hoodie) (produced with CashMoneyAP and Dez Wright)

==== Juice Wrld - Goodbye & Good Riddance ====
- 2. "All Girls Are the Same"
- 3. "Lucid Dreams"
- 7. "Lean wit Me"
- 8. "I'll Be Fine" (Produced with JR Hitmaker)
- 9. "Used To"
- 10. "Candles" (Produced with Taz Taylor)
- 13. "I'm Still"
- 14. "End of the Road"

=== 2019 ===
==== Iann Dior - Nothings Ever Good Enough ====
- 1. "18" (produced with Taz Taylor and KC Supreme)
- 2. "romance361" (featuring PnB Rock) (produced with Sidepce)
- 3. "cutthroat"
- 4. "molly" (featuring Bernard Jabs)
- 5. "emotions"
- 6. "who cares"

==== Iann Dior - Industry Plant ====
- 3. "gone girl" (featuring Trippie Redd) (produced with Pearl Lion and Pharaoh Vice)
- 5. "What Is Real" (produced with Pharaoh Vice)
- 6. "Flowers" (produced with E-Trou and Cxdy)
- 8. "Lately" (produced with Y2K)
- 11. "Searching" (featuring phem) (produced with Taz Taylor)
- 15. "Stay For a While" (produced with Pharaoh Vice and Omer Fedi)

==== Aries - WELCOME HOME ====
- 4. "AMY'S GRAVE"

G-Eazy - B-Sides

- 2. "Bang" (featuring Tyga) (produced with VanRiper)

==== Lil Tecca - We Love You Tecca ====
- 1. "Ransom" (produced with Taz Taylor)
- 2. "Shots" (produced with Taz Taylor)
- 4. "Did It Again" (produced with Taz Taylor and E-Trou)
- 7. "Bossanova" (produced with Pvlace and HNX Beats)
- 10. "Phenom" (produced with Dez Wright and Stoopid Lou)
- 18. "Ransom (Remix)" (featuring Juice Wrld) (produced with Taz Taylor)

==== Juice Wrld - Death Race for Love ====
- 1. "Empty"
- 8. "Robbery"
- 9. "Flaws and Sins"
- 10. "Feeling"
- 11. "Bandit" (with YoungBoy Never Broke Again)

==== Trippie Redd - A Love Letter to You 4 ====
- 4. "Love Me More" (produced with Taz Taylor)
- 7. "6 Kiss" (featuring Juice Wrld and YNW Melly) (produced with Taz Taylor)
- 20. "Abandoned" (featuring Mariah the Scientist) (produced with Taz Taylor)

==== Post Malone - Hollywood's Bleeding ====
- 8. "On The Road" (featuring Meek Mill and Lil Baby) (produced with Louis Bell)

==== Young Thug - So Much Fun ====
- 1. "Just How It Is" (produced with Wheezy)

=== 2020 ===
==== Trippie Redd - A Love Letter to You 4 (Deluxe) ====
- 1. "I Love You" (featuring Chance the Rapper) (produced with Shadxw)
- 4. "How I Was Raised" (featuring Lil Tecca) (produced with Taz Taylor and Repko)

==== Polo G - The Goat ====
- 10. "No Matter What"

==== Juice Wrld - Legends Never Die ====
- 5. "Righteous"
- 7. "Smile" (Produced with Cxdy and Taz Taylor)
- 8. "Tell Me U Luv Me" (Produced with OK Tanner)
- 14. "Fighting Demons" (Produced with Dorien Theus)
- 16. "Screw Juice"

==== Internet Money - B4 the Storm (Complete Edition) ====
- 1. "Lemonade" (featuring Gunna, Don Toliver and Nav)
- 2. "Blastoff" (featuring Juice Wrld and Trippie Redd) (produced with KC Supreme, Repko, pharaohvice, Taz Taylor)
- 4. "Lemonade" (Remix) (featuring Don Toliver and Roddy Ricch)
- 5. "Thrusting" (featuring Swae Lee and Future) (produced with Cxdy, Jasper, Rio Leyva, Resource, Nash, Taz Taylor)
- 6. "Somebody" (featuring Lil Tecca and A Boogie wit da Hoodie) (produced with Taz Taylor)
- 8. "JLO" (featuring Lil Tecca) (produced with Taz Taylor)
- 9. "Giddy Up" (featuring Wiz Khalifa and 24KGoldn) (produced with Taz Taylor, John Luther, DT)
- 12. "Really Redd" (featuring Trippie Redd, Lil Keed and Young Nudy) (produced with Taz Taylor)
- 13. "Let You Down" (featuring TyFontaine and TheHxliday) (produced with Taz Taylor)
- 15. "Block" (featuring Trippie Redd and StaySolidRocky) (produced with Taz Taylor, Tim Henson)
- 17. "Devastated" (featuring lilspirit) (produced with Taz Taylor, Alec Wigdahl)

==== Lil Tecca - Virgo World ====
- 11. "Insecurities" (produced with Taz Taylor)
- 19. "Out of Love" (featuring Internet Money) (produced with Saint Luca Beats, Taz Taylor, TheSkyBeats and Repko)

==== Machine Gun Kelly - Tickets to My Downfall ====
- 3. "Drunk Face" (produced with Travis Barker, Machine Gun Kelly and Omer Fedi)

==== Kodak Black - Bill Israel ====
- 6. "Pimpin Ain't Eazy" (produced with Charlie Handsome)

=== 2021 ===
==== 24KGoldn - El Dorado ====
- 2. "Company" (produced with Blake Slatkin and Omer Fedi)
- 4. "Outta Pocket" (produced with Neek, Blake Slatkin and Omer Fedi)
- 10. "Empty" (produced with Omer Fedi, Blake Slatkin and KBeaZy)

==== Juice Wrld - Goodbye & Good Riddance Anniversary Edition ====
- 2. "734" (Produced with DT)
- 4. "Lucid Dreams" Remix

==== Polo G - Hall of Fame ====
- 13. "Zooted Freestyle" (produced with Lil Mosey and NicoNiceWitIt)

==== Dro Kenji - F*CK YOUR FEELINGS ====
- 4. "LOVE YOU MOST" (produced with Cxdy, Nico Baran and Census)
- 4. "DANGEROUS" (produced with Taz Taylor and John Luther)
- 8. "HADES" (produced with DT and Taz Taylor)
- 10. "LAMBO TRUCK" (produced with Brian Lee and Taz Taylor)
- 11. "EXPENSIVE" (produced with Nico Baran, Taz Taylor, Census and Cxdy)

==== The Kid LAROI - F*CK LOVE 3: OVER YOU ====
- 3. "LONELY AND F*CKED UP" (produced with Taz Taylor and Cxdy)

==== Juice Wrld - Fighting Demons ====
- 2. "Already Dead" (produced with DT)
- 3. "Cigarettes"
- 11. "Feline" (with Trippie Redd and Polo G) (produced with DT and Haan)
- 12. "Relocate" (produced with DT)
- 15. "From My Window"
- 18. "My Life In A Nutshell"

==== glaive - all dogs go to heaven ====
- 1. "1984" (produced with Whethan)

==== glaive and ericdoa - then i'll be happy ====
- 5. "physs" (produced with Mochila, Glasear, Fortune Swan, and Whethan)

==== JPRO - PMD2 ====
- 1. "Pringle Chips" (produced with Rio Leyva and John Luther)

==== PxnGuin - a hate note ====
- 1. "A hate note" (produced with EZY)

==== Matte Roxx! - SARAH ====
- 4. "MY BEAUTIFUL DARK TW!STED FANTASY!" (produced with Matte Roxx!)

==== Moonkey, ARÓN & Gxra - INFRAVALORADO ====
- 12. "MODO AVION" (produced with Gxra)

=== 2022 ===
==== Internet Money - We All We Got -EP ====
- 5. "Codeine Cowboy" (featuring Lil Yachty) (produced with Taz Taylor)

==== A Boogie wit da Hoodie - Me vs Myself ====
- 13. "Damn Homie" (featuring Lil Durk) (produced with Rio Leyva and Noir1070)

=== 2023 ===
==== Lil Tecca - TEC ====
- 7. "Salty" (produced with Rio Leyva, Taz Taylor, Dynox, Scizzie)

=== 2024 ===
==== September Juice Wrld and Young Thug - The Pre-Party [EP] ====
- 2. "Lightyears" (Produced with Minor2Go)

==== October Juice Wrld and Young Thug - The Pre-Party (Extended) [EP] ====
- 1. "Both Ways" (Produced with Pharaoh Vice)
- 4. "Lightyears" (Produced with Minor2Go)

==== November Juice Wrld - The Party Never Ends ====
- 5. "Cuffed" (Produced with Benny Blanco and Cashmere Cat)
- 6. "Empty Out Your Pockets"
- 7. "KTM Drip" (Produced with DT)
- 8. "Love Letter" (Produced with Benny Blanco, Cashmere Cat and DT)
- 14. "Jeffery"
- 15. "Barbarian" (Produced with DT)

==== Non-Album Singles ====
- "His & Hers" - Internet Money (featuring Don Toliver, Gunna, and Lil Uzi Vert) (produced with Taz Taylor, Alec Wigdahl, Pharaoh Vice, and Cxdy)
- "Flood My Wrist" - A Boogie wit da Hoodie and Don Q (featuring Lil Uzi Vert) (produced with Doe Pesci)
- "Memories" - LORRREY (produced with Sogimura)
- "Whipski" - $NOT (featuring Lil Skies)
- "LV Bags" - Xerld
- "V12" - Iann Dior (featuring Lil Uzi Vert)(produced with Taz Taylor and Cxdy)
- "Beautiful" - Rot Ken and SoFaygo (produced with jetsonmade, Taz Taylor, Neeko Baby, John Luther, and Paryo)
- "FINDERS KEEPERS" - Dro Kenji and Scorey (produced with Nash Beats and Taz Taylor)

== Awards and nominations ==
Year	Awards	Nominated work	Category	Result
2020	BMI R&B/Hip-Hop Awards	Himself	Producer of the Year	Won
