= Armed and Dangerous (song) =

2018 single by Juice WRLD

Single by Juice Wrld

from the album Goodbye & Good Riddance
- Released: October 15, 2018
- Recorded: 2018
- Genre: Hip hop
- Length: 2:49
- Label: Grade A; Interscope
- Songwriters: Jarad Higgins; Andre Proctor
- Producer: Dre Moon

Juice Wrld singles chronology
"Fine China" (2018)	"Armed and Dangerous" (2018)	"Roses" (2018)

Music video
- "Armed and Dangerous" on YouTube

"Armed and Dangerous" is a song by American rapper Juice WRLD, released as a single on October 15, 2018. The music video for the song was released in October, however was taken down and re-released on November 9 of the same year due to Lyrical Lemonade not having proper licensing rights to the song. The track was later included as part of a Spotify, Tidal, Deezer, YouTube Music and Pandora exclusive reissue of Juice Wrld’s debut studio album Goodbye & Good Riddance, on December 10, 2018. The track was not included on the May 28, 2021, reissue of the album, commemorating the third anniversary of the project.

== Critical reception ==
HotNewHipHop stat the track "recalls the vibe" of Juice Wrld's debut album Goodbye & Good Riddance and "would fit in nicely alongside his more party-friendly joints as he sings about how he has no need to hire a bodyguard since he's got the stick on him at all times". XXL said "Armed and Dangerous" "finds Juice getting back in his bag", calling it a "free associative" track "where the melodically inclined artist spits about his come-up while firing off some flexes and self-aware bars".

== Music video ==
Juice Wrld released the video on November 9, 2018. It was directed by frequent collaborator Cole Bennett, which was posted on his Lyrical Lemonade production company. As of June 2026, the video has accumulated over 331 millions of views on YouTube. It depicts Juice Wrld performing the song at a warehouse.

== Track listing ==
Digital download
No.	Title	Length
1.	"Armed and Dangerous"	2:49

== Charts ==
=== Weekly charts ===
Chart (2018)	Peak position
Canada (Canadian Hot 100)	42
Ireland (IRMA)	68
New Zealand Hot Singles (RMNZ)	5
Sweden (Sverigetopplistan)	61
UK Singles (Official Charts)	80
US Billboard Hot 100	44
US Hot R&B/Hip-Hop Songs (Billboard)	19
US Rolling Stone Top 100	95

=== Year-end charts ===
Chart (2019)	Position
US Hot R&B/Hip-Hop Songs (Billboard)	54

== Certifications ==
Region	Certification	Certified units/sales
Australia (ARIA)	Gold	35,000^{‡}
Austria (IFPI Austria)	Gold	15,000^{‡}
Brazil (Pro-Música Brasil)	Gold	20,000^{‡}
Canada (Music Canada)	5× Platinum	400,000^{‡}
Denmark (IFPI Danmark)	Gold	45,000^{‡}
New Zealand (RMNZ)	2× Platinum	60,000^{‡}
Poland (ZPAV)	Gold	25,000^{‡}
Portugal (AFP)	Gold	5,000^{‡}
United Kingdom (BPI)	Platinum	600,000^{‡}
United States (RIAA)	5× Platinum	5,000,000^{‡}
^{‡} Sales+streaming figures based on certification alone.

== Release history ==
Region	Date	Format	Label	Ref.
Worldwide	November 9, 2018	Digital download	Grade A; Interscope	
