= Goodbye & Good Riddance =

Studio album by Juice Wrld
- Released: May 23, 2018
- Recorded: 2017–2018
- Genres: Hip hop; emo rap
- Length: 40:13
- Labels: Grade A; Interscope
- Producers: Nick Mira; Cardo; Cashmere Cat; CBMix; Dre Moon; Ghost Loft; JR Hitmaker; Mitch Mula; Nick Mira; Ric & Thadeus; Sidepce; Taz Taylor

Juice Wrld chronology
Nothings Different (2017)	Goodbye & Good Riddance (2018)	Wrld on Drugs (2018)

Singles from Goodbye & Good Riddance
- 1. "All Girls Are the Same" Released: February 26, 2018; 2. "Lucid Dreams" Released: May 11, 2018; 3. "Lean wit Me" Released: May 23, 2018; 4. "Wasted" Released: July 10, 2018 (Note: Single not included on the original release.); 5. "Armed and Dangerous" Released: November 9, 2018

5th year anniversary edition cover

Original cover

Goodbye & Good Riddance is the debut studio album by American rapper Juice Wrld. It was released on May 23, 2018, by Grade A Productions and Interscope Records. It contains a sole guest appearance from Lil Uzi Vert as well as production primarily handled by Nick Mira alongside several other record producers, including Benny Blanco, Cardo, CBMix, Don Rob, Dre Moon, Ghost Loft, and Mitch Mula.

The album has been reissued multiple times, most notably to include the singles "Wasted" (featuring Lil Uzi Vert) and "Armed and Dangerous" on some streaming platforms.

Goodbye & Good Riddance was praised by critics for its raw emotional honesty and cathartic energy, particularly in its depiction of heartbreak and teenage angst, with many publications listing it as one of the best albums of 2018. The album was also a commercial success. It debuted at number 15 on the Billboard 200 chart and eventually peaked at number 4. The album also achieved platinum status, with over 5 million units sold and streamed in the US. Furthermore, it has spent over 440 weeks on the Billboard 200 chart, making it his longest-charting album.

== Background and reissues ==
In an interview with Zane Lowe on Beats 1 Radio, Juice Wrld spoke on the background of the album, stating:

[I'm] just trying to make music to help people through their situations and tell them about some of my own. It's all genuine, so I think that's what adds to it. Back in high school, even before that, I was good at freestyling. Then I started rapping, and I recorded a few records that didn't have any substance. I thought 'why not put my heart into what I'm making?

The album was originally uploaded to SoundCloud under the title Fuck You Bella; this would later be changed to Goodbye & Good Riddance, with all references to the titular Bella being removed from the tracklist. For example, a skit titled "Bella's Betrayal" was changed to simply "Betrayal".

On July 10, 2018, the album was reissued to include the track "Wasted" featuring Lil Uzi Vert, which was also released as a single on the same day. This edition of the album would later be released on vinyl.

On December 10, 2018, a further reissue of the album would appear on the streaming services Spotify and Tidal. This exclusive edition of the album features a re-organized tracklist and includes the single "Armed and Dangerous".

On May 28, 2021, the album was re-released to commemorate its third anniversary. This reissue included two new tracks, one titled "734" and the other being a remix of "Lucid Dreams" featuring Lil Uzi Vert. "Armed and Dangerous" was excluded from this edition of the album.

The album was once again reissued in 2023 to commemorate its fifth anniversary. This edition contains two new tracks, Glo'd Up and No Good and the tracklist has been rearranged.

== Singles ==
The album's lead single, "All Girls Are the Same", was released on April 13, 2018. The song peaked at number 41 on the US Billboard Hot 100.

The second single, "Lucid Dreams", was released on May 4, 2018. The song peaked at number two on the Hot 100.

The third single, "Lean wit Me", was released on May 22, 2018. The song peaked at number 68 on the Hot 100.

The fourth single, "Wasted" featuring Lil Uzi Vert, was released on July 10, 2018, alongside a reissue of the album, shortly after premiering on Zane Lowe's Beats 1 radio. The song peaked at number 67 on the Hot 100.

The fifth single, "Armed and Dangerous", was released on October 15, 2018, and included on another reissue of the album exclusive to Spotify and Tidal in December 2018. The song peaked at number 44 on the Hot 100.

== Critical reception ==
Professional ratings
Review scores
Source	Rating
HipHopDX	3.2/5
Pitchfork	6.4/10
Tom Hull – on the Web	B+
Theneedledrop	5/10
AllMusic	7/10
The Young Folks	7/10

Jay Balfour of Pitchfork described Goodbye & Good Riddance as "an adolescent breakup record that is equal parts endearing and grating", praising the album's sound: "his heart-on-his-sleeve coping sounds both ingratiating and grating. In that way at least, he's bottled up sad sap adolescence remarkably well". Bryan Hahn of HipHopDX criticized the lyricism for being "without any focus on creative stanzas or convincing in-depth first-person experiences". He later said Higgins has the potential to grow as an artist, remarking "Juice's best potential songwriting is yet to come" and "Juice feels willing to keep things interesting for the sake of art and is backed by a moderate understanding (and interest) in varied melodies and cadences".

In the 2022 listing, Rolling Stone named Goodbye & Good Riddance the 199th greatest hip-hop album of all time.

== Commercial performance ==
Goodbye & Good Riddance debuted at number 15 on the US Billboard 200 with 39,000 album-equivalent units in its first week. In its second week, the album moved up to number eight with an additional 45,000 units. In its third week, the album climbed the chart to number six with 42,000 album-equivalent units. As of March 2019, Goodbye & Good Riddance has earned a million album-equivalent units in the United States. On May 23, 2023, the album was certified quintuple platinum by the Recording Industry Association of America (RIAA) for combined sales and album-equivalent units of over five million units.

== Track listing ==
Credits adapted from Tidal.

Standard edition (original release)
No.	Title	Writer(s)	Producer(s)	Length
1.	"Intro"	Jarad Higgins; Christian Laster; Billie O'Connell; Finneas O'Connell; Khalid Robinson	Don Rob	1:14
2.	"All Girls Are the Same"	Higgins; Nicholas Mira; Danny Snodgrass	Mira	2:45
3.	"Lucid Dreams"	Higgins; Mira; Dominic Miller; Snodgrass; Gordon Sumner	Mira	3:59
4.	"Lean wit Me"	Higgins; Mira	Mira	2:55
5.	"I'm Still"	Higgins; Mira	Mira	3:12
6.	"Betrayal (Skit)"	Higgins		1:04
7.	"Candles"	Higgins; Mira; Snodgrass	Mira; Taz Taylor (Note: Uncredited co-producer.)	3:03
8.	"Scared of Love (with instrumental by Ghost Loft)"	Higgins; Danny Choi; Dominique Mitchell	Ghost Loft; Mitch Mula	2:50
9.	"Used To"	Higgins; Mira	Mira	2:56
10.	"Karma (Skit)"	Higgins; Laster; B. O'Connell; F. O'Connell; Robinson		1:14
11.	"Hurt Me (Note: Originally titled "Sticks and Stones".)"	Higgins; Mira	SidePce	2:02
12.	"Black & White"	Higgins; Magnus Høiberg; Benjamin Levin; Nathan Perez; Sasha Sloan; Justin Tranter	Benny Blanco; Cashmere Cat; James Kang	3:06
13.	"Long Gone"	Higgins; Ronald LaTour	Cardo; Ric & Thadeus	3:07
14.	"End of the Road"	Higgins; Mira	Mira	2:42
15.	"I'll Be Fine"	Higgins; Mira	Mira; JR Hitmaker	4:04
Total length:				40:31

Wasted Reissue (standard edition as of July 10, 2018)
No.	Title	Writer(s)	Producer(s)	Length
5.	"Wasted" (featuring Lil Uzi Vert)	Higgins; Christopher Barnett; Symere Woods	CBMix	4:18
Total length:				47:30

Spotify and Tidal bonus track
No.	Title	Writer(s)	Producer(s)	Length
5.	"Armed and Dangerous"	Higgins; Andre Proctor	Dre Moon	2:49
Total length:				47:30

3rd Anniversary Edition
No.	Title	Writer(s)	Producer(s)	Length
17.	"734"	Higgins; Mira	Mira	3:16
18.	"Lucid Dreams" (Remix) (featuring Lil Uzi Vert)	Higgins; Mira; Dominic Miller; Snodgrass; Gordon Sumner; Symere Woods	Mira	4:00
Total length:				54:46

5th Anniversary Edition
No.	Title	Writer(s)	Producer(s)	Length
5.	"No Good" (with Rvssian)	Higgins; Chris Blackwood	Tarik Johnston	4:13
20.	"Glo'd Up"	Higgins	Take a Daytrip	2:31
Total length:				58:40

Notes:

- "Intro", "Betrayal (Skit)", and "Karma (Skit)" contain uncredited vocals by ToiNoStory.
- The 5th anniversary edition retains the original tracklist but rearranges the order by inserting bonus anniversary songs between the original tracks.

Sample credits:

- "Intro" and "Karma (Skit)" contain samples of "Lovely", as performed by Billie Eilish and Khalid.
- "Scared Of Love (with instrumental by Ghost Loft)" contains a sample of "So High", as performed by Ghost Loft.
- "Lucid Dreams" features an interpolation of "Shape of My Heart", as performed by Sting.

== Personnel ==
Credits adapted from Tidal.

- Juice WRLD – vocals, primary artist, composer
- Lil Uzi Vert – vocals on "Wasted"

Technical

- Don Rob – mixing (track 1)
- Justin Craig — mixing (track 4)
- Lil Bibby – mixing (tracks 2–6, 8–10, 12, 15, 16)
- James Kang – mixing (track 13)

== Charts ==
=== Weekly charts ===
Chart (2018–2024)	Peak position
Australian Albums (ARIA)	17
Austrian Albums (Ö3 Austria)	26
Belgian Albums (Ultratop Flanders)	19
Belgian Albums (Ultratop Wallonia)	177
Canadian Albums (Billboard)	5
Danish Albums (Hitlisten)	5
Estonian Albums (IFPI)	3
Dutch Albums (Album Top 100)	11
Finnish Albums (Suomen virallinen lista)	7
French Albums (SNEP)	141
German Albums (Offizielle Top 100)	54
Hungarian Albums (MAHASZ)	30
Irish Albums (IRMA)	16
Italian Albums (FIMI)	78
Latvian Albums (LAIPA)	2
Lithuanian Albums (AGATA)	11
New Zealand Albums (RMNZ)	15
Nigerian Albums (TurnTable)	45
Norwegian Albums (VG-lista)	5
Polish Albums (ZPAV)	92
Swedish Albums (Sverigetopplistan)	7
Swiss Albums (Schweizer Hitparade)	66
UK Albums (Official Charts)	23
US Billboard 200	4
US Top R&B/Hip-Hop Albums (Billboard)	3
US Top Rap Albums (Billboard)	3

=== Year-end charts ===
Chart (2018)	Position
Belgian Albums (Ultratop Flanders)	129
Canadian Albums (Billboard)	25
Danish Albums (Hitlisten)	16
Dutch Albums (MegaCharts)	72
Estonian Albums (IFPI)	34
Icelandic Albums (Tónlistinn)	44
New Zealand Albums (RMNZ)	46
Swedish Albums (Sverigetopplistan)	23
US Billboard 200	18
US Top R&B/Hip-Hop Albums (Billboard)	14

Chart (2019)	Position
Belgian Albums (Ultratop Flanders)	68
Canadian Albums (Billboard)	19
Danish Albums (Hitlisten)	27
Dutch Albums (Album Top 100)	36
Icelandic Albums (Tónlistinn)	31
Irish Albums (IRMA)	46
New Zealand Albums (RMNZ)	48
Swedish Albums (Sverigetopplistan)	42
UK Albums (OCC)	80
US Billboard 200	17
US Top R&B/Hip-Hop Albums (Billboard)	9

Chart (2020)	Position
Australian Albums (ARIA)	57
Belgian Albums (Ultratop Flanders)	31
Canadian Albums (Billboard)	21
Danish Albums (Hitlisten)	34
Dutch Albums (Album Top 100)	23
Icelandic Albums (Tónlistinn)	29
Irish Albums (IRMA)	27
New Zealand Albums (RMNZ)	29
Swedish Albums (Sverigetopplistan)	40
UK Albums (OCC)	40
US Billboard 200	18
US Top R&B/Hip-Hop Albums (Billboard)	10

Chart (2021)	Position
Australian Albums (ARIA)	73
Belgian Albums (Ultratop Flanders)	50
Canadian Albums (Billboard)	23
Danish Albums (Hitlisten)	42
Dutch Albums (Album Top 100)	35
Icelandic Albums (Tónlistinn)	65
Norwegian Albums (VG-lista)	33
Swedish Albums (Sverigetopplistan)	67
UK Albums (OCC)	61
US Billboard 200	22
US Top R&B/Hip-Hop Albums (Billboard)	11

Chart (2022)	Position
Australian Albums (ARIA)	98
Belgian Albums (Ultratop Flanders)	78
Canadian Albums (Billboard)	37
Danish Albums (Hitlisten)	99
Dutch Albums (Album Top 100)	50
US Billboard 200	29
US Top R&B/Hip-Hop Albums (Billboard)	15

Chart (2023)	Position
Belgian Albums (Ultratop Flanders)	99
Dutch Albums (Album Top 100)	80
US Billboard 200	40
US Top R&B/Hip-Hop Albums (Billboard)	16

Chart (2024)	Position
Australian Hip Hop/R&B Albums (ARIA)	42
Belgian Albums (Ultratop Flanders)	86
US Billboard 200	71
US Top R&B/Hip-Hop Albums (Billboard)	24

Chart (2025)	Position
Belgian Albums (Ultratop Flanders)	162
US Billboard 200	77
US Top R&B/Hip-Hop Albums (Billboard)	25

=== Decade-end charts ===
Chart (2010–2019)	Position
US Billboard 200	57

== Certifications ==
Region	Certification	Certified units/sales
Australia (ARIA)	Platinum	70,000^{‡}
Belgium (BRMA)	2× Platinum	40,000^{‡}
Canada (Music Canada)	5× Platinum	400,000^{‡}
Denmark (IFPI Danmark)	4× Platinum	80,000^{‡}
France (SNEP)	Gold	50,000^{‡}
Germany (BVMI)	Gold	100,000^{‡}
Italy (FIMI)	Platinum	50,000^{‡}
Netherlands (NVPI)	Platinum	37,200^{‡}
New Zealand (RMNZ)	4× Platinum	60,000^{‡}
Poland (ZPAV)	2× Platinum	40,000^{‡}
Portugal (AFP)	Gold	3,500^{‡}
Singapore (RIAS)	Gold	5,000^{*}
United Kingdom (BPI)	2× Platinum	600,000^{‡}
United States (RIAA)	5× Platinum	5,000,000^{‡}
^{*} Sales figures based on certification alone.^{‡} Sales+streaming figures based on certification alone.

== Release history ==
Release dates and formats for Goodbye & Good Riddance
Region	Date	Label(s)	Format(s)	Edition
Various	May 23, 2018	Grade A; Interscope	Digital download; streaming	Standard
Various	July 10, 2018	Grade A; Interscope	Vinyl; digital download; streaming	Wasted reissue
Various	December 10, 2018	Grade A; Interscope	Digital download; streaming	Spotify and Tidal reissue
Various	May 28, 2021	Grade A; Interscope	Digital download; streaming	Anniversary
Various	May 19, 2023	Grade A; Interscope	Vinyl; digital download; streaming	5 year anniversary
