= Fine China (Future and Juice Wrld song) =

2018 single by Future and Juice Wrld

Single by Future and Juice Wrld

from the album Wrld on Drugs
- Released: October 15, 2018
- Recorded: July 2018
- Genre: Trap
- Length: 2:22
- Label: Epic; Freebandz; Grade A; Interscope
- Songwriters: Nayvadius Wilburn; Jarad Higgins; Wesley Glass; Simon Christensen; Corey French
- Producers: Wheezy; Psymun; SinGrinch

Future singles chronology
"No Shame" (2018)	"Fine China" (2018)	"Crushed Up" (2019)

Juice Wrld singles chronology
"Wasted" (2018)	"Fine China" (2018)	"Armed and Dangerous" (2018)

Music video
- "Fine China" on YouTube

"Fine China" is a song by American rappers Future and Juice Wrld, released as the lead single on October 15, 2018, by Epic from the duo's collaborative mixtape Wrld on Drugs (2018). It was written by the two and produced by Wheezy, Psymun and SinGrinch. It was also released on the same day Juice Wrld released "Armed and Dangerous".

== Composition ==
The song was composed in a studio session between Future and Juice in July 2018. The song is a poppy trap song with an upbeat instrumental track and melodic vocals delivered by Juice, who begins the song with a "sultry" chorus containing lines like "Tell her that she beautiful everyday, I remind her/Then I jump in the pussy like a lake, I'm a diver". Future then delivers rhymes in the second verse about traveling to the various planets of the Solar System.

== Critical reception ==
"Fine China" was called a "light and bouncy attempt at a bombastic love song" and a "syrupy-sweet party record" by Spin. Billboard summarized the song as the "woozy rhymers detail[ing] various experiences regarding their love life over hard-hitting production", with Rap-Up labeling the collaboration a "celebration" of the rappers' girlfriends, and XXL also noting it is an "ode to each rapper's significant other". Noisey deemed the song "smooth" and "wrapped in punchy basslines", as well as a "marriage of two misery-inclined artists". Uproxx opined that the track is an "inventive new flex" with "trunk-rattling production".

Writing for Rolling Stone, Charles Holmes called the song "kinda fun" and an "upbeat sugar rush", but questioned Juice Wrld's lyrics and his "strained" voice, writing that the hook "Shawty like a thousand dollar plate of fine china" is a "baffling metaphor". Ultimately he said it is a "fine collaboration that could've been a good one" if edited down to remove the "insulting fat" of the track. Various publications, including Pitchfork noted Juice Wrld's line "So if she leaves, I'ma kill her, oh, she'll die/Did I say that out loud? I'm so crazy about mine" as problematic, with Pitchfork calling it "completely wince-worthy and tasteless" and saying it "highlights the very real scenario of women being killed by their partners after they choose to leave them". In 2019, Billboard and NME ranked "Fine China" at number nine and number four, respectively, on their lists of the greatest Juice Wrld songs.

== Music video ==
Juice Wrld shared a photo of himself and Future wearing shiny silver suits in a desert setting to Instagram, which was called a "tease" and a behind-the-scenes look at what was thought to be the upcoming music video for the track. However, it turned out the clip was for the Wrld on Drugs deep cut, 'No Issue'.

== Charts ==
Chart (2018)	Peak position
Australia (ARIA)	85
Austria (Ö3 Austria Top 40)	61
Canada Hot 100 (Billboard)	24
Ireland (IRMA)	54
New Zealand Hot Singles (RMNZ)	9
Norway (VG-lista)	37
Slovakia Singles Digital (ČNS IFPI)	91
Sweden (Sverigetopplistan)	54
UK Singles (Official Charts)	55
US Billboard Hot 100	26
US Hot R&B/Hip-Hop Songs (Billboard)	14
US Rhythmic Airplay (Billboard)	26

== Certifications ==
Region	Certification	Certified units/sales
Canada (Music Canada)	4× Platinum	320,000^{‡}
New Zealand (RMNZ)	Platinum	30,000^{‡}
United Kingdom (BPI)	Silver	200,000^{‡}
United States (RIAA)	3× Platinum	3,000,000^{‡}
^{‡} Sales+streaming figures based on certification alone.
