= Ally Lotti =

American influencer (born 1993)

- Born: Alicia L. Leon; May 28, 1993 (age 33); Philadelphia, Pennsylvania, US
- Other name: highimallyy
- Education: University of Alabama
- Occupation: Social media influencer
- Years active: 2012–present

Instagram information
- Page: ally lotti
- Years active: 2012–present
- Followers: 1 million
- Last updated: May 19, 2026

Alicia L. Leon, or Ally Lotti (born May 28, 1993) is an American social media influencer and model best known as the former girlfriend of late rapper Juice Wrld. In 2022, she faced criticism for posting videos of her and Juice Wrld on OnlyFans and for selling his clothes and other belongings.

== Early life ==
Lotti was born on May 28, 1993, in Philadelphia, Pennsylvania. She went to University of Alabama.

== Biography ==
Following Juice Wrld's death in December 2019, Lotti spoke at Rolling Loud about her grief and experiences and appeared in the documentary Juice Wrld: Into the Abyss (2021), which explored parts of his career, personal life, and struggles with substance use. In 2023, Lotti was arrested on three drug- and theft-related charges. She was released from the Crittenden County Detention Center eight hours later after posting her $2500 bond.

== OnlyFans venture ==
In September 2022, Lotti started an OnlyFans, where she was selling and promoting intimate videos of herself and Juice Wrld. According to Lotti, hackers had threatened to leak the videos, and she chose to release them herself rather than allow others to profit from it. The situation sparked criticism online from Juice Wrld's fans.
