= Lucid Dreams (Juice Wrld song) =

2018 single by Juice Wrld

Single by Juice Wrld

from the EP JuiceWrld 9 9 9 and the album Goodbye & Good Riddance
- Released: June 15, 2017
- Recorded: June 13, 2017 (Soundcloud)
- Studio: Enviyon Studios, Country Club Hills
- Genre: Emo rap
- Length: 3:59
- Label: Grade A; Interscope
- Songwriters: Jarad Higgins; Nick Mira; Danny Snodgrass Jr.; Gordon Sumner; Dominic Miller; Yellowcard
- Producer: Nick Mira

Juice Wrld singles chronology
"All Girls Are the Same" (2018)	"Lucid Dreams" (2017)	"Lean wit Me" (2018)

Music video
- "Lucid Dreams" on YouTube

Audio sample
- file; help

Alternate cover

"Lucid Dreams" (formerly "Lucid Dreams (Forget Me)") is a song by American rapper and singer Juice Wrld. It was officially released by Grade A Productions and Interscope Records on May 4, 2018, after previously being released on SoundCloud in June 2017. The song was produced by Nick Mira and debuted at number 74 on the Billboard Hot 100, peaking at number 2 on the chart. The song has over 3 billion streams on Spotify, being one of the most-streamed songs on the platform. As of May 2025, the music video has over 1.1 billion views on YouTube. In February 2022, the song was certified Diamond by RIAA for selling over 10 million units in the U.S.

== Background ==
In a June 2018 interview with Lyrical Lemonade, Juice Wrld stated the song was made to be a "therapy session" during a period of relationship problems he was encountering. In the lyrics, he describes the pain of a girl breaking up with him, and in the verse he relates back to the title: saying he has lucid dreams thinking of her.

"Lucid Dreams" was initially released on SoundCloud on June 15, 2017, alongside the EP JuiceWrld 9 9 9. It eventually accumulated 2.5 million plays, leading to an official release as a single on May 4, 2018. In November 2018, producer Nick Mira revealed that Sting owned 85% of the rights to "Lucid Dreams," which features an interpolation of his 1993 hit "Shape of My Heart".

=== Yellowcard lawsuit ===
In October 2019, members of then-defunct pop punk band Yellowcard sued Juice Wrld for $15 million, claiming that "Lucid Dreams" copied the melody of their 2006 song "Holly Wood Died". Following Juice Wrld's death on December 8, 2019, the band extended a "deadline for defendants to respond to the lawsuits" into February 2020. Yellowcard's law firm King & Fallow issued a statement disputing the $15 million figure in the lawsuit as "falsely reported" with the final figure yet to be determined. While expressing sympathies for Juice Wrld's sudden death, the firm said the action would be pursued despite "incredible mixed emotions" from the band and firm. After Juice Wrld's mother became the representative of his estate, Yellowcard dropped the lawsuit on July 27, 2020, with the band's lawyer, Richard S. Busch, stating that the band was "very sympathetic not only of Juice Wrld's death, but also needed time to decide whether they really wanted to pursue the case against his grieving mother as the personal representative of his estate." Busch did however state that the case could be refiled if the band were to change their minds.

== Composition ==
"Lucid Dreams" runs for four minutes. The meter is common time (4/4 time) and the key is F♯ minor. The tempo is 84 BPM. The song is structured around an interpolation of Sting's 1993 song "Shape of My Heart".

== Music video ==
A music video for "Lucid Dreams" was directed by Cole Bennett, released and uploaded on Lyrical Lemonade YouTube channel on May 11, 2018. It features Juice Wrld trapped up to his head in a floor, with his body tied down, and has been described by Milca P. of HotNewHipHop as "psychedelic and abstract". The music video reached one billion views on August 7, 2024, 6 years after the video was originally published.

== Reception ==
The song debuted at number 74 on the Billboard Hot 100 on the week ending May 26, 2018, with 10 million US streams and 4,000 digital downloads. The song jumped to number 35 the following week and then number 15. When it ascended to number nine, "Lucid Dreams" became Juice Wrld's first top 10 song on June 12, with 35.9 million US streams and 9,000 downloads. Reaching number three on the chart in July, the song lingered in the top 10 for months until it peaked at number two in October, blocked from the top spot by Maroon 5's "Girls Like You". Following Juice Wrld's death in December 2019, "Lucid Dreams" re-entered the Hot 100 at number eight, becoming its 26th nonconsecutive week in the top ten.

During the 2019 Grammy telecast, host Alicia Keys performed 30 seconds of "Lucid Dreams", singing and playing piano, during a segment on songs about heartache.

In 2019, Billboard and NME ranked "Lucid Dreams" at number two and number one, respectively, on their lists of the greatest Juice Wrld songs.

== Charts ==
=== Weekly charts ===
Weekly chart performance
Chart (2018–2020)	Peak position
Australia (ARIA)	8
Austria (Ö3 Austria Top 40)	26
Belgium (Ultratop 50 Flanders)	30
Belgium (Ultratip Bubbling Under Wallonia)	15
Canada Hot 100 (Billboard)	4
Canada CHR/Top 40 (Billboard)	32
Czech Republic Singles Digital (ČNS IFPI)	13
Denmark (Tracklisten)	11
Finland (Suomen virallinen lista)	7
France (SNEP)	65
France Radio (SNEP)	16
Germany (GfK)	36
Global 200 (Billboard)	103
Greece (IFPI)	7
Hungary (Stream Top 40)	9
Iceland (Tónlistinn)	15
Ireland (IRMA)	11
Italy (FIMI)	45
Latvia (LAIPA)	6
Netherlands (Global Top 40)	6
Netherlands (Single Top 100)	11
Netherlands Streaming (Streaming Top 40)	8
New Zealand (Recorded Music NZ)	3
Norway (VG-lista)	13
Poland Airplay (ZPAV)	45
Portugal (AFP)	3
Scotland Singles (Official Charts)	16
Slovakia Singles Digital (ČNS IFPI)	13
Spain (PROMUSICAE)	77
Sweden (Sverigetopplistan)	5
Switzerland (Schweizer Hitparade)	22
UK Singles (Official Charts)	10
UK Hip Hop/R&B (Official Charts)	3
US Billboard Hot 100	2
US Hot R&B/Hip-Hop Songs (Billboard)	1
US Pop Airplay (Billboard)	7
US Hot Rap Songs (Billboard)	1
US Rhythmic Airplay (Billboard)	1
US Rolling Stone Top 100	4

=== Year-end charts ===
Chart (2018)	Position
Australia (ARIA)	38
Canada (Canadian Hot 100)	20
Denmark (Tracklisten)	25
Netherlands (Single Top 100)	48
New Zealand (Recorded Music NZ)	33
Portugal (AFP)	9
Sweden (Sverigetopplistan)	23
Switzerland (Schweizer Hitparade)	90
UK Singles (OCC)	53
US Billboard Hot 100	12
US Hot R&B/Hip-Hop Songs (Billboard)	7
US Mainstream Top 40 (Billboard)	41
US Rhythmic (Billboard)	9
Chart (2019)	Position
Australia (ARIA)	91
Canada (Canadian Hot 100)	54
Portugal (AFP)	97
US Billboard Hot 100	48
US Hot R&B/Hip-Hop Songs (Billboard)	44
US Rolling Stone Top 100	48
Chart (2020)	Position
Australia (ARIA)	84
Portugal (AFP)	101
UK Singles (OCC)	95
Chart (2021)	Position
Global 200 (Billboard)	175
Portugal (AFP)	117

=== Decade-end charts ===
Chart (2010–2019)	Position
US Billboard Hot 100	51
US Hot R&B/Hip-Hop Songs (Billboard)	19

== Certifications ==
Region	Certification	Certified units/sales
Australia (ARIA)	6× Platinum	420,000^{‡}
Austria (IFPI Austria)	2× Platinum	60,000^{‡}
Belgium (BRMA)	Platinum	40,000^{‡}
Brazil (Pro-Música Brasil)	Diamond	160,000^{‡}
Canada (Music Canada)	Diamond	800,000^{‡}
Denmark (IFPI Danmark)	3× Platinum	270,000^{‡}
France (SNEP)	Gold	100,000^{‡}
Germany (BVMI)	3× Gold	600,000^{‡}
Italy (FIMI)	Platinum	50,000^{‡}
Netherlands (NVPI)	Platinum	80,000^{‡}
New Zealand (RMNZ)	6× Platinum	180,000^{‡}
Poland (ZPAV)	3× Platinum	150,000^{‡}
Portugal (AFP)	4× Platinum	40,000^{‡}
Spain (Promusicae)	Platinum	60,000^{‡}
United Kingdom (BPI)	4× Platinum	2,400,000^{‡}
United States (RIAA)	11× Platinum	11,000,000^{‡}
Streaming
Greece (IFPI Greece)	Platinum	2,000,000^{†}
Sweden (GLF)	Platinum	8,000,000^{†}
^{‡} Sales+streaming figures based on certification alone.^{†} Streaming-only figures based on certification alone.

== Release history ==
Region	Date	Format	Label	Ref.
United States	May 4, 2018	Rhythmic contemporary	Grade A Productions; Interscope	
United States	July 17, 2018	Contemporary hit radio	Grade A Productions; Interscope	

== See also ==
- Lucid dream
