= Juice Wrld =

American rapper (1998–2019)

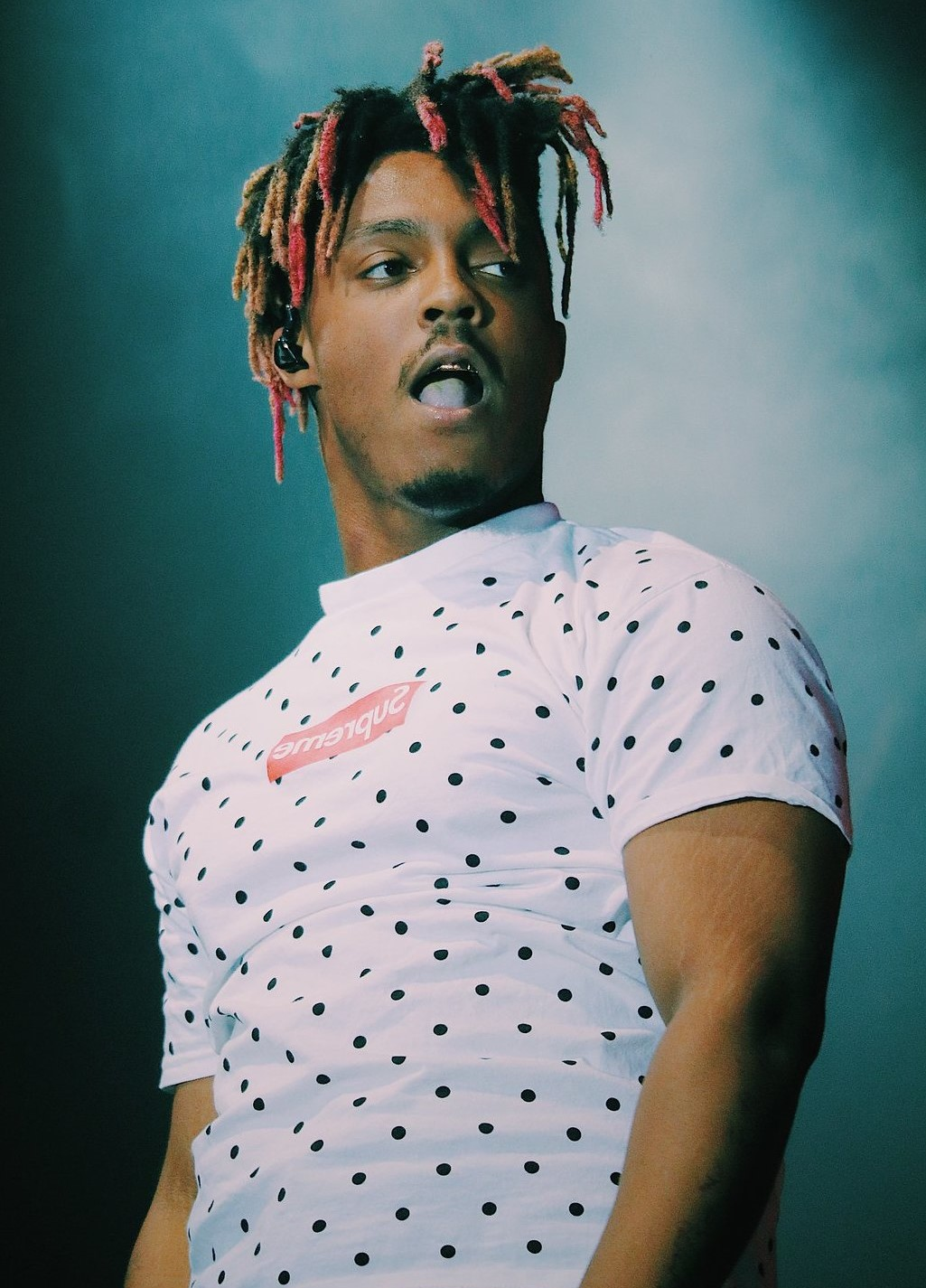
- Juice Wrld performing in July 2019
- Born: Jarad Anthony Higgins; December 2, 1998; Chicago, Illinois, U.S.
- Died: December 8, 2019 (aged 21); Oak Lawn, Illinois, U.S.
- Cause of death: Acute oxycodone and codeine intoxication
- Resting place: Beverly Cemetery, Blue Island, Illinois, U.S.
- Other name: JuicetheKidd
- Occupations: Rapper; singer; songwriter
- Years active: 2015–2019
- Works: Discography (unreleased songs)
- Mother: Carmela Wallace
- Relatives: Young Dolph (second cousin)
- Musical career
- Origin: Homewood, Illinois, U.S.
- Genres: Hip-hop; emo rap; trap; alternative rock; pop rap; SoundCloud rap
- Labels: Grade A; Interscope; Polydor

Jarad Anthony Higgins (December 2, 1998 – December 8, 2019), known professionally as Juice Wrld (stylized as Juice WRLD), was an American rapper, singer, and songwriter. He emerged as a leading figure in the emo and SoundCloud rap genres, which garnered mainstream attention during the mid-to-late 2010s. His stage name, which he said represents "taking over the world", was derived from the crime thriller film Juice (1992).

Higgins began his career as an independent artist in 2015 under the name JuicetheKidd, and signed a recording contract with fellow Chicago rapper Lil Bibby's Grade A Productions in 2017; he entered a joint venture with Interscope Records early the following year. He gained recognition with the diamond-certified 2018 single "Lucid Dreams", which peaked at number two on the Billboard Hot 100. The song preceded his triple platinum debut album Goodbye & Good Riddance (2018), which also included the Billboard Hot 100 entries "All Girls Are the Same", "Lean wit Me", "Wasted", and "Armed and Dangerous". He then released the collaborative mixtape Wrld on Drugs (2018) with Future, as well as his second album, Death Race for Love (2019); the latter contained the hit single "Robbery" and became Higgins's first number one debut on the US Billboard 200.

Higgins died of a drug overdose on December 8, 2019. His first posthumous album, Legends Never Die (2020), matched chart records for most successful posthumous debut and for most U.S. top-ten entries from one album, while the single "Come & Go" (with Marshmello) became Higgins's second song to reach number two on the Hot 100. His second posthumous album, Fighting Demons (2021), was released alongside the documentary film Juice Wrld: Into the Abyss and contained the U.S. top 20 single "Already Dead". His third posthumous album, The Party Never Ends (2024), was released alongside an appearance and virtual concert in the video game Fortnite. In July 2026, it was announced via an Instagram post that a sixth studio album titled "The Outsiders" is in the works.

== Early life ==
Jarad Anthony Higgins was born on December 2, 1998, in Chicago, Illinois, to Carmela Wallace. He grew up in the south suburbs and often played in Calumet Park. He later moved to Homewood and graduated from Homewood-Flossmoor High School in 2017. His parents divorced when he was three years old. He grew up with his mother; Carmella Wallace, and older brother in a single-parent home. Higgins's father died in June 2019. Higgins's mother was very religious and conservative; she did not let him listen to hip-hop. He was allowed to listen to rock and pop music; he was introduced to artists including Billy Idol, Blink-182, Black Sabbath, Fall Out Boy, Megadeth, and Panic! at the Disco through video games like Tony Hawk's Pro Skater and Guitar Hero.

Higgins was a heavy drug user during his childhood and teens. He drank lean for the first time in the sixth grade, and began using Percocet and Xanax in 2013. He smoked cigarettes before quitting during his last year of high school because of health issues.

He learned to play the piano at four years old, having been inspired by his mother who later began paying for his lessons. He then took up the guitar and drums while playing the trumpet for band class. In his sophomore year of high school, he began posting songs to SoundCloud which he recorded on his smartphone. Around that time, Higgins began to take rapping more seriously.

== Career ==
=== 2015–2017: Beginnings and recognition ===
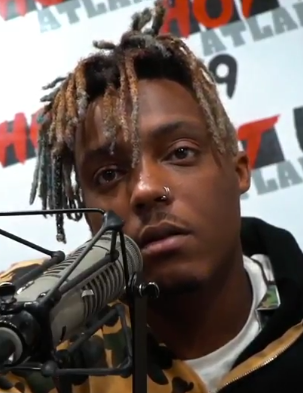
Higgins in July, 2018 in an interview with HOTSPOTATL

Higgins developed as an artist in his first year of high school. His first track, "Forever", was released on SoundCloud in 2015 under the name JuicetheKidd. Higgins recorded most of his first tracks on a cellphone, uploading them to SoundCloud in his sophomore year. He changed his name from JuicetheKidd, a name inspired by his affection for rapper Tupac Shakur's role in the film Juice, to Juice Wrld, because he and his associates believed the change would benefit his career. In an interview with the Atlanta radio station WHTA, Higgins revealed that the latter part of his stage name initially had no meaning but that he came to think it "represents taking over the world".

"Too Much Cash", Higgins's first track to be produced by frequent collaborator Nick Mira, was released in 2017. While releasing projects and songs on SoundCloud, Higgins worked in a factory but was dissatisfied with the job; he was fired within two weeks. After joining the internet collective Internet Money, Higgins released his debut full-length EP, 9 9 9, on June 15, 2017, with the song "Lucid Dreams" breaking out and growing his following.

Higgins also briefly performed under the name Juice in early 2017. In mid-2017, he received attention from artists such as Waka Flocka Flame and Southside, as well as fellow Chicago artists G Herbo and Lil Bibby. He subsequently signed with Lil Bibby's co-owned record label, Grade A Productions. In December 2017, Higgins released the three-song EP Nothings Different. The project was covered by the hip-hop blog Lyrical Lemonade, with Higgins's track "All Girls Are the Same" gaining popularity through the blog post.

=== 2018: Goodbye & Good Riddance ===
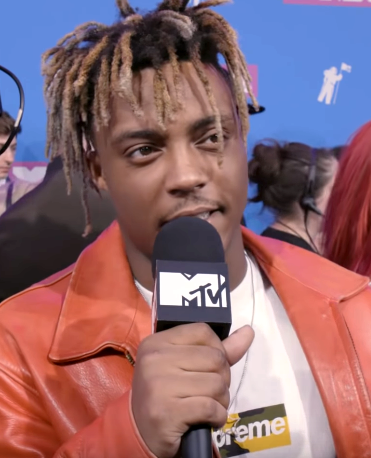
Higgins at the MTV Video Music Awards in August 2018

A music video for "All Girls Are the Same" directed by Cole Bennett was released in February 2018. Following the video's release, Interscope Records signed Higgins for $3 million and a remix featuring Lil Yachty was previewed but never officially released. "All Girls Are the Same" was critically acclaimed, receiving a Best New Music designation from Pitchfork. It was released as a single in April. "All Girls Are the Same" and "Lucid Dreams" were Higgins's first entries on any Billboard chart, debuting on the Hot 100 at numbers 92 and 74, respectively.

On May 4, 2018, "Lucid Dreams" was officially released as a single and accompanied by a Cole Bennett-directed music video, similarly to "All Girls Are the Same". It peaked at number two on the Hot 100 and quickly became one of the most streamed songs of 2018; it remains his most-streamed song, reaching over one billion streams on Spotify by January 2020. "Lucid Dreams" was followed by "Lean Wit Me" on May 22, which peaked at number 68 on the Hot 100; Higgins's debut full-length album, Goodbye & Good Riddance, which included his three previous singles, released the following day. This album gained him much recognition and praise, along with cementing him as a rising star in the US. On June 19, he released a two-song EP titled Too Soon.. in remembrance of, and dedicated to, deceased rappers Lil Peep and XXXTentacion. Lil Peep died of an overdose in 2017 and XXXTentacion was murdered on June 18, 2018, one day before the project was released. Higgins said that he and XXXTentacion were friends and that they would have FaceTime calls together, revealing that their last conversation was about meeting up. The cover of the Too Soon.. EP is a screenshot of a conversation between Higgins and XXXTentacion. The song "Legends" from the EP debuted at number 65 on the Hot 100 and peaked at number 29 over a year later following Higgins's death.

"Wasted" (featuring Lil Uzi Vert) was released on July 10; it was Higgins's first single featuring a collaboration and the only song on Goodbye & Good Riddance with a featured guest. It debuted at number 68 on the Hot 100 and peaked at 67 in its second week on the chart. On July 11, Higgins announced that he was working on his next album. On July 20, Higgins announced his first tour, WRLD Domination, with additional acts YBN Cordae and Lil Mosey. On July 25, Higgins's producer Danny Wolf released the official version of "Motions" on SoundCloud following a series of leaks.

Travis Scott's song "No Bystanders", from his third studio album, Astroworld, featured Higgins and Sheck Wes. The song peaked at number 31 on the Billboard Hot 100. Higgins made his late night television debut performing the song "Lucid Dreams" on Jimmy Kimmel Live! on August 8, 2018. On October 15, the song "Armed and Dangerous" was released along with the music video followed by the lead single, "Fine China", from the collaborative mixtape, Wrld on Drugs with Future. Epic Records released the mixtape on October 19. He collaborated with American singer Seezyn for the song "Hide" from the film Spider-Man: Into the Spider-Verse and its soundtrack, both of which were released on December 14, 2018.

=== 2019: Death Race for Love ===
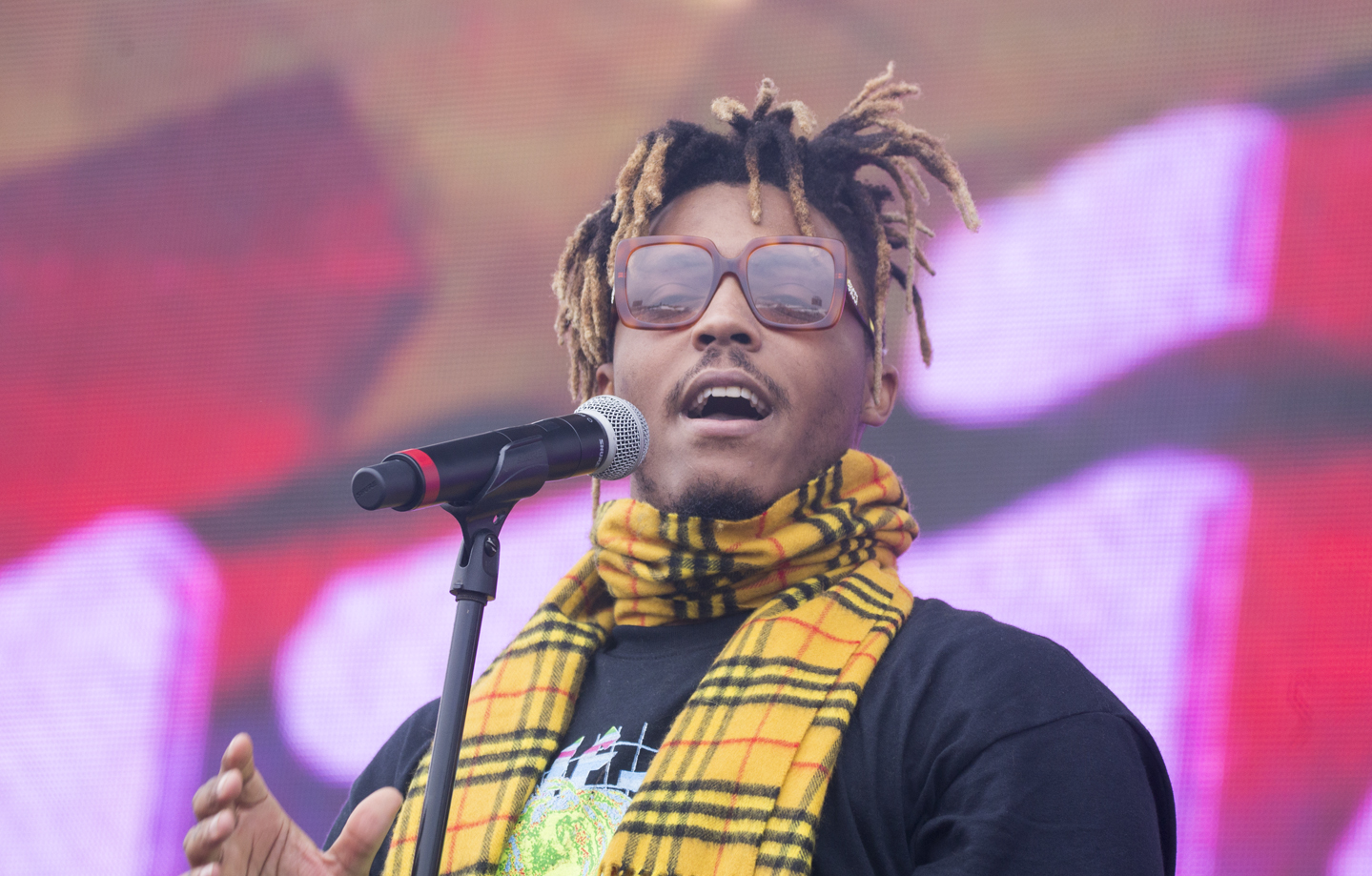
Higgins performing in May 2019

In a December 2018 interview with XXL, Ski Mask the Slump God confirmed that he would be releasing a joint mixtape with Higgins titled Evil Twins in 2019; the project has yet to be released. The pair also announced a 2019 tour featuring 30 concerts across North America. Higgins's second studio album, Death Race for Love, was released on March 8, 2019, preceded by the singles "Robbery" and "Hear Me Calling". The album topped the Billboard 200 chart. He then embarked on The Nicki Wrld Tour, alongside Trinidadian rapper Nicki Minaj. Higgins released the music video for the song "Fast" from Death Race for Love on April 9. Later that year, he released other singles: "All Night" with RM and Suga of BTS, "Hate Me" with Ellie Goulding, "Run", "Graduation" with Benny Blanco, and "Bandit" with NBA YoungBoy. Released in early October, "Bandit" was the last song to be released by Higgins before his death that December. It peaked at number ten on the Hot 100.

== Posthumous releases ==
=== 2020: Legends Never Die ===
Higgins's first posthumous appearance was on Eminem's eleventh studio album Music to Be Murdered By on the track "Godzilla", released on January 17, 2020. "Godzilla" peaked at number three on the Hot 100 and number one on the UK Singles Chart. On January 22, an announcement was posted on Higgins's Instagram account by members of his family and the team at Grade A Productions that thanked fans for their adoration for Higgins and confirmed their intention to release music that he was working on at the time of his death.

Higgins was featured on "PTSD", the title track of G Herbo's fourth studio album PTSD, released on February 28. The track also features Lil Uzi Vert and Chance the Rapper. "PTSD" marked the first time that Higgins and Lil Uzi Vert had collaborated on a song since "Wasted". On March 13, a remix of the single "Suicidal", from YNW Melly's debut studio album Melly vs. Melvin, featuring vocals from Higgins, was released. The remix includes a different verse and outro Higgins had recorded. The song reappeared on the Hot 100 and peaked at number 20 following the release of the remix. The single "No Me Ame", a multilingual collaboration between Higgins, Jamaican record producer Rvssian, and Puerto Rican rapper Anuel AA, was released on April 17. A computer-generated image depicting Higgins as an angel appears in the background of the song's music video.

Higgins's first posthumous single, "Righteous", was released on April 24 and an accompanying music video featuring footage of Higgins was uploaded to his YouTube channel. Higgins had recorded the song at his home studio in Los Angeles. On May 4, Higgins's girlfriend, Ally Lotti, announced that his upcoming third album and first posthumous album would be titled The Outsiders. On May 29, the song "Tell Me U Luv Me" (featuring Trippie Redd) was released alongside a music video directed by Cole Bennett. "Go", Higgins's collaboration with Australian rapper the Kid Laroi (whom Higgins mentored), was released on June 12.

On July 6, it was announced that the title of Higgins's first posthumous album had been changed to Legends Never Die. Between the album's announcement and its release, two single collaborations were released; "Life's a Mess" (featuring Halsey) and "Come & Go" (featuring Marshmello). The album was released on July 10, with 21 songs and four singles that Higgins's estate claims "best represents the music Juice was in the process of creating". The album debuted at number one on the Billboard 200. Five of its songs reached the top 10 of the Hot 100 on the week ending July 25: "Come & Go", "Wishing Well", "Conversations", "Life's a Mess", and "Hate the Other Side" (a collaboration with Polo G and the Kid Laroi), which reached number two, five, seven, nine, and ten, respectively. Higgins is the third artist to accomplish this feat; the other artists being the Beatles and Drake. "Life's a Mess" jumped from number 74 to number nine that week. "Wishing Well", which had been critically lauded following the album's release, was sent to rhythmic contemporary radio as the album's fifth single on July 28. On August 6, "Smile" with the Weeknd was released as a single. "Smile" had previously been leaked on YouTube and SoundCloud under the title "Sad" over a year before, though with an open verse in place of the Weeknd's.

On October 23, Lil Bibby confirmed that a second posthumous album was in the works. On December 2, which would have been Higgins's twenty-second birthday, Benny Blanco released a collaborative single titled "Real Shit". Six days later, on December 8, the anniversary of his death, "Reminds Me of You" (featuring the Kid Laroi) was released. In 2020, Higgins was streamed on Spotify over 5.9 billion times, making him the fourth most streamed artist in the world.

=== 2021–2022: Fighting Demons ===
On January 15, 2021, Higgins's estate released "Bad Boy" (featuring Young Thug), which was accompanied by a Cole Bennett-directed music video shot entirely before Higgins's death; this marks the final collaboration between the artist and director before the former's death. On March 5, "Life's a Mess II" (featuring Clever and Post Malone), an alternative version of the track "Life's a Mess" from Legends Never Die, was released. On May 28, Higgins's debut full-length album Goodbye & Good Riddance was re-released to commemorate its third anniversary; the re-release includes two new songs, one titled "734" and the other being a remix of "Lucid Dreams" (featuring Lil Uzi Vert). The 2018 single "Armed and Dangerous", which was included on the December 2018 Spotify and Tidal reissue of the album, is excluded from the revised tracklist.

Following the re-release of Goodbye & Good Riddance, another posthumous project titled The Party Never Ends was teased by Higgins's management. On June 11, two tracks featuring Higgins were released; "Antisocial" from Migos's album Culture III, and "Can't Leave You Alone" from Maroon 5's Jordi. On August 20, "Matt Hardy 999", a song featuring Higgins from Trippie Redd's album Trip at Knight, was released. Higgins was also featured on Young Thug's album Punk, which released on October 15. On November 11, Higgins's estate announced that his second posthumous album, Fighting Demons, a tie-in for the documentary film Juice Wrld: Into the Abyss, would be released on December 10. The album was accompanied by three singles: "Already Dead", "Wandered to LA" (featuring Justin Bieber), and "Girl of My Dreams" (featuring Suga of BTS). The first track was released on November 12, the second on December 3, and the third on December 10. The latter track "Girl of My Dreams", released as a standalone digital release, served as the first promotional single from Fighting Demons (2021) and earned Higgins his first number one on the Billboard Digital Song Sales chart.

In early 2022, an extended version of "Go Hard", titled "Go Hard 2.0", was added to the tracklist of Fighting Demons, in addition to two previously unreleased songs, "Cigarettes" and "Sometimes;" "Cigarettes" debuted at number 43 on the Billboard Hot 100, while "Sometimes" debuted at number 57. On August 26, Higgins was featured on the track "Juice Wrld Did" from DJ Khaled's album God Did. In an interview with Jay-Z, Khaled revealed that he chose to add the song to his album as a tribute to Higgins after Lil Bibby reached out to him and advocated for its inclusion. On October 14, "Bye Bye", a collaborative single with Marshmello, was released alongside a music video. On October 28, Higgins's estate released the song "In My Head;" prior to its release, a 30-second snippet of the track was uploaded to Spotify under the title "Rush Hour". The song was accompanied by a Steve Cannon and Chris Long-directed music video that depicts Higgins recording music and touring at various points throughout his career through the use of archival footage.

=== 2023–2024: The Party Never Ends ===
On February 4, 2023, Higgins's estate announced that his fifth and final studio album, the previously teased The Party Never Ends, was in active development. A two track EP, The Pre-Party, was released on September 9, 2024, as a precursor to the album. An extended edition of the EP was released on October 14. On November 15, the song "AGATS2 (Insecure)" (featuring Nicki Minaj) was released as the lead single for The Party Never Ends. The album was released on November 29.

A partnership between Higgins's estate and Epic Games saw the addition of two Juice Wrld outfits to the video game Fortnite as promotional tie-ins; his in-game likeness performed a virtual concert alongside the rappers Snoop Dogg, Eminem, and Ice Spice on November 30. The song "Empty Out Your Pockets" was premiered during the event and subsequently added to the track list of The Party Never Ends.

On May 30, 2025, Higgins's remix of XXXTentacion's song "Whoa (Mind in Awe)", which Higgins had completed before his death, was officially released. On July 11, 2025, as a part of the 5th anniversary of Higgins's third album Legends Never Die, the song "The Way" with XXXTentacion was released. On March 6, 2026, "We Don't Get Along", a collaborative single with Marshmello, was released alongside a music video, having first leaked in September 2020.

=== 2026–present: The Outsiders ===
In 2020, Juice Wrld's girlfriend, Ally Lotti, revealed the title to a new studio album called "The Outsiders" Higgins was working on before his death. On July 24, 2026, Lil Bibby announced in an Instagram post that the album was "coming soon".

== Artistry ==
=== Musical style ===
Higgins said his musical influences were genre-wide from emo, hip-hop, elements of rock, punk and R&B, and that his biggest influences were rappers Travis Scott, Chief Keef, Kanye West, and British rock singer Billy Idol. Billboard writer Michael Saponara claimed, "If West and his sparse 808s were a tree, it would have grown another branch with the blossoming art displayed by fellow Chicago native Juice WRLD in 2018". Higgins was among the ranks of openly vulnerable artists born from the emo rap scene inspired by West's influential fourth album, 808s & Heartbreak (2008). During an interview with All Def Music, Higgins said, "I was singing 'Street Lights' like I had shit to be sad about. Kanye [West] is a time traveler. That nigga went to damn near 2015 and came back with some sauce". His other influences included Wu-Tang Clan, Quietdrive, Fall Out Boy, Black Sabbath, the Starting Line, the Cranberries, the City Drive, 2Pac, Eminem, XXXTentacion, Kid Cudi, and Escape the Fate. Higgins had also stated that he listened to bands such as Panic! at the Disco and Killswitch Engage.

"Lucid Dreams"
"Lucid Dreams" is a melodic rap song. It features emotionally vulnerable lyrics imbued with teenage angst. The song contains an interpolation of "Shape of My Heart" by Sting.

"Lean Wit Me"
"Lean Wit Me" harbors dark lyrical themes. It bears a strong fixation on addiction as well as contemplations of mortality. The song's lyrics are laced with references to narcotics and binging. They serve to comment on the consequences of substance abuse and overindulgence. Juice Wrld's melodic vocal style veers on melancholic crooning.

Higgins's music has been branded as "emo" and "rock" leaning, "genre-bending" with music focusing on "every broken heart, every wounded feeling". More specifically, he has been labeled as a hip-hop, emo rap, trap, and SoundCloud rap artist. With a penchant for short, hook-heavy songs, Higgins was a leading figure in hip-hop during the late 2010s. In 2018, the streaming platform Spotify named "emo rap" its fastest growing genre. Higgins achieved significant mainstream success as a figurehead of the sub-genre. This was boosted by his collaboration with Panic! at the Disco frontman Brendon Urie. Higgins himself considered the emo label to be both negative and positive as he felt that music sometimes has to be somewhat dark to reflect that "the world is not really a light [or happy] place".

Higgins said that "Lucid Dreams" was the only track from Goodbye & Good Riddance that he wrote, while the rest was done impromptu. Rather than write down his rhymes, Higgins crafted whole songs in a few minutes by way of off-the-cuff rhyming. Most of the time, his songwriting process involved freestyling lyrics instead of writing them down. When he did write a song, it usually began with hearing a beat and instantaneously conceiving an idea, although Higgins sometimes found himself alone with an idea for a song and afraid that he would be unable to remember it hours later after arriving at the studio. For this reason, he sometimes took a voice memo or simply wrote the whole song.

Higgins saw the value in his position as one of very few contemporary SoundCloud artists who could compose soul-baring ballads and odes but remain comfortable freestyle rapping over classic hip-hop beats. Rather than eschewing it, his freestyles emphasize wordplay and feel indebted to the art form's tradition. When asked for his opinion on why freestyles are no longer considered the rite of passage in hip-hop culture as they once were he replied, "Stuff is just changing, that's all. We're moving into a new era of music. I feel like it's not necessarily a good thing to forget where shit started, but shit is changing". Though his songs do not always feature very technical lyricism, intricate flows or tongue-twisting wordplay, Higgins delivered inventive flows and memorable bars during his freestyles.

=== Lyrical themes ===
His most successful singles express melodic, emo-inspired compositions that exhibit his songwriting skill. His songs harbor melodic flows to complement their melancholic subjects. Higgins claimed he talked about things others are thinking but are afraid to speak about, such as being vulnerable and hurt. Having built a following through emo rap, Higgins offered lyrics that touch on heartbreak and fragmented feelings. Though not entirely groundbreaking, his musical approach provided a sense of familiarity that heartbroken adolescents of the current generation could gravitate towards. Higgins maintained that he only wrote from personal experience, and found strength in his pain and vulnerability. While the lyrical content of his songs often centered on heartache and bitterness, there are occasionally more boastful lines and creative references.

== Personal life ==
Higgins had a history of drug abuse which began at an early age; he spoke openly about his experiences. His mother claimed that he was also dealing with anxiety and depression on top of his battle with drug addiction. Higgins had agreed to attend drug rehabilitation weeks prior to his death.

He was living in Los Angeles, California, with his girlfriend, Ally Lotti, at the time of his death. In November 2018, the pair revealed via Instagram that they were dating.

In August 2021, a YouTube interview between No Jumper and Lotti was published, where she revealed that she was pregnant with Higgins's baby on 3 separate occasions. However, they all resulted in a miscarriage due to the stress of both of their lifestyles. In the year before this, exactly one year after Higgins's fatal overdose, Lotti made a series of now-deleted tweets, where she also revealed that she was pregnant at the time of his death, however had a miscarriage, due to "grief".

== Death ==
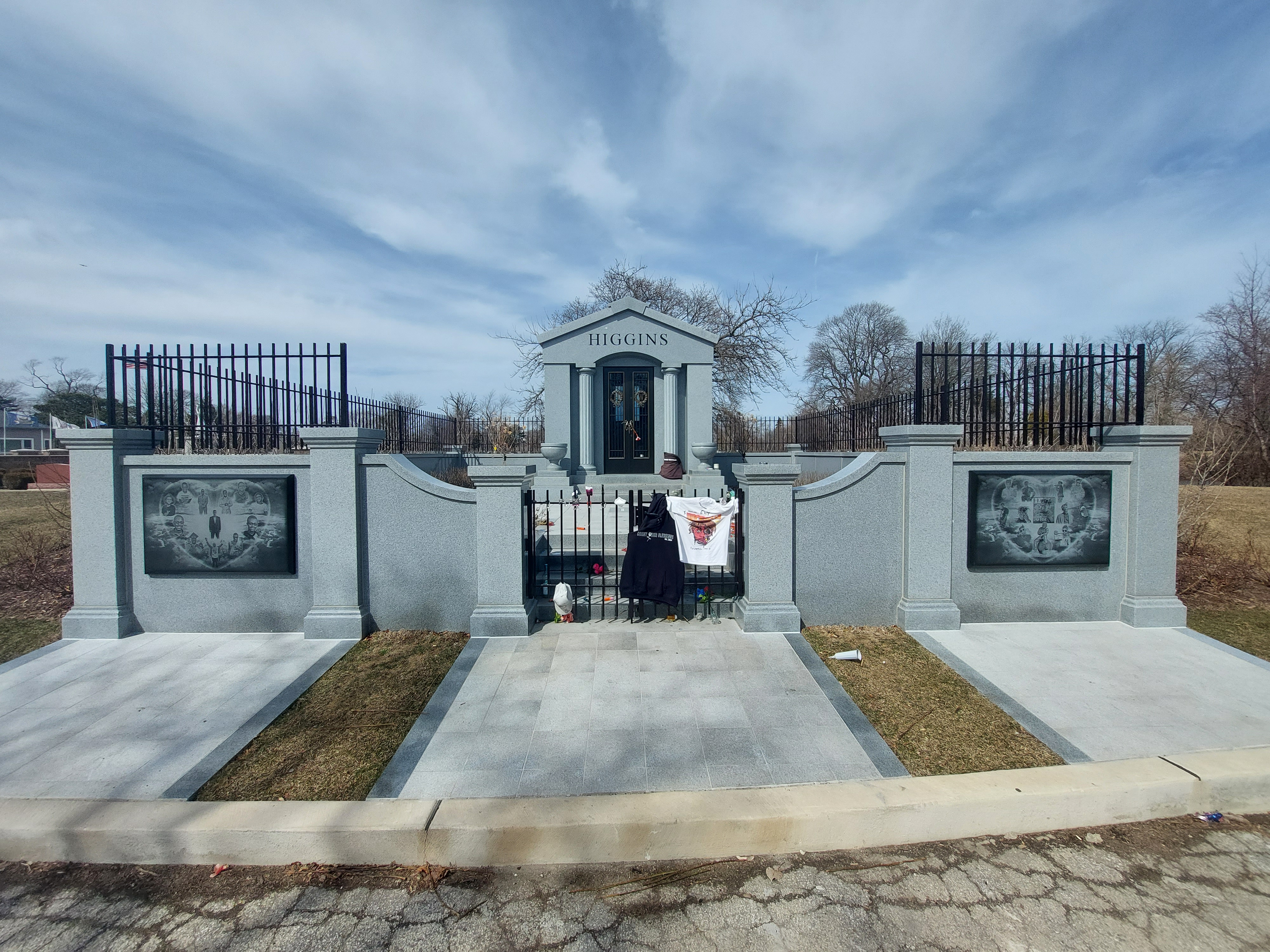
Higgins's mausoleum in Blue Island, Illinois, pictured in March 2022

On December 8, 2019, Higgins was aboard a private Gulfstream jet flying from Van Nuys Airport in Los Angeles to Midway International Airport in Chicago. Law enforcement officers were waiting for the jet to arrive, having been notified by federal agents, while the flight was en route, that they suspected there were guns and drugs on the plane. Law enforcement officials said that they found 70 lb (32 kg) of marijuana on the aircraft and said several members of Higgins's management team aboard the flight told them that Higgins had taken "several unknown pills", including allegedly swallowing multiple Percocet pills while police were on board the plane searching the luggage.

Higgins had a convulsion episode and a seizure; two doses of emergency medication naloxone (Narcan) were administered, as it was suspected that he had an opioid overdose. Chicago PD were told a man (Higgins) had suffered a medical emergency at around 2:00 local time (8:00 GMT). Higgins was transported to the nearby Advocate Christ Medical Center in Oak Lawn, where he was pronounced dead. The Cook County Medical Examiner's Office did not initially determine the cause of death. On January 22, 2020, it was announced that he had died from toxic levels of oxycodone and codeine. Higgins's funeral was held on December 13, 2019, at the Holy Temple Cathedral Church of God in Christ in Harvey. Friends and family were in attendance, including collaborators Ski Mask the Slump God and Young Thug.

Fellow rapper Boosie Badazz suggested that the pilot of the plane was ultimately responsible for Higgins's death, referring to him as being a snitch. In fact, Higgins had been suspected by federal authorities of illegal activity following an incident that occurred in November 2019 before he departed for Australia, which prompted a search of his plane. Badazz gave an interview threatening violence upon the pilot before later recanting, after reflecting on the dangers of young artists suddenly being overwhelmed with money. Rapper Uncle Murda purported that Higgins's overdose was not due to clinical addiction.

== Legacy ==
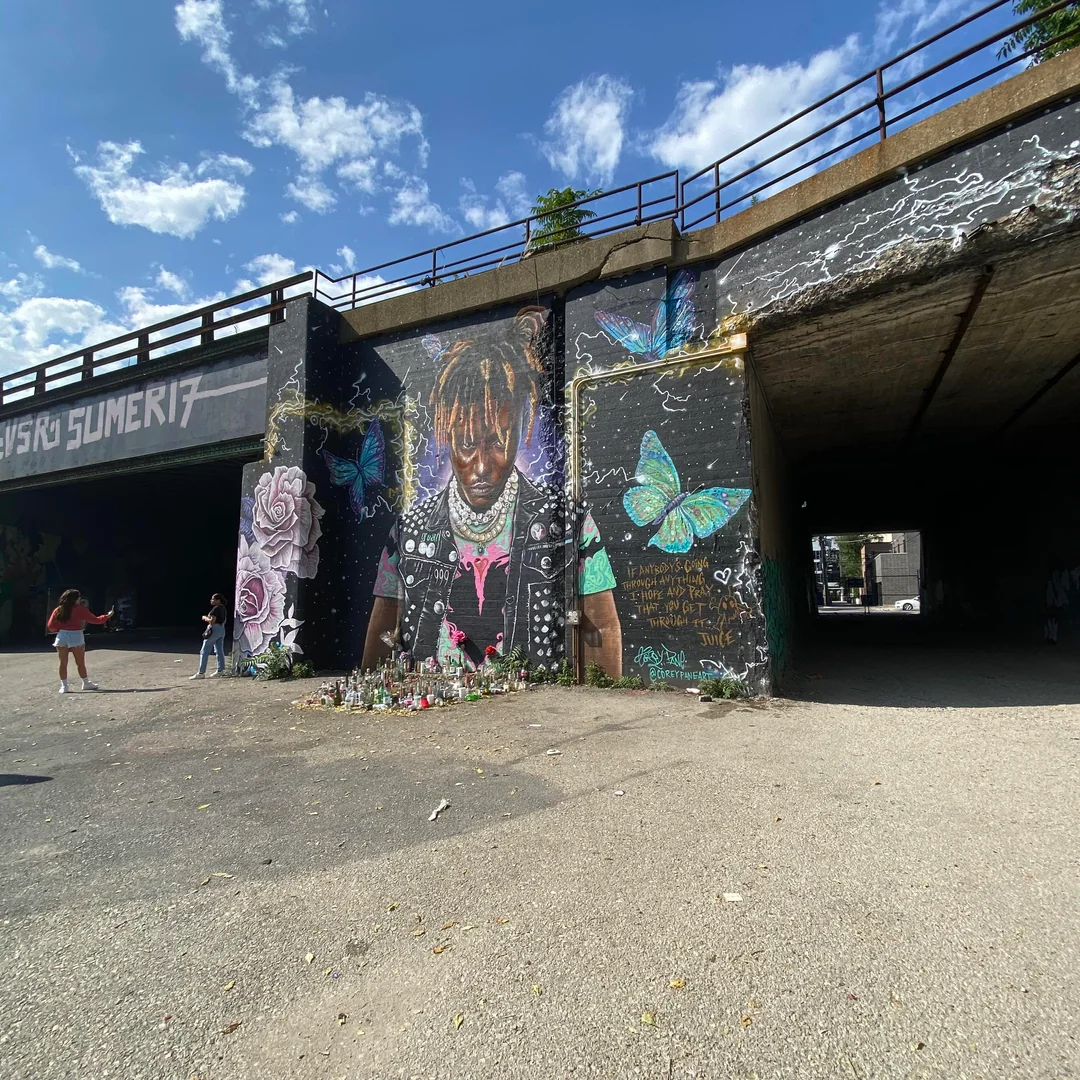
A Juice Wrld memorial

British artist Ellie Goulding, who collaborated with Higgins on her single "Hate Me", described him in a tweet by saying he was "such a sweet soul" and had "so much further to go". Chicagoan Chance the Rapper paid tribute on Instagram: "Millions of people, not just in Chicago but around the world are hurting because of this and don't know what to make of it." Lil Nas X also wrote on Twitter: "So sad how often this is happening lately to young talented rising artists." Ski Mask the Slump God, a rapper and Higgins's close friend with whom he had collaborated with on the song "Nuketown", said on Twitter: "They keep taking my brothers from me", also referring to his best friend and longtime collaborator XXXTentacion, who was shot and killed in June 2018. Lil Yachty, who had remixed Higgins's song "All Girls Are the Same" mourned his death by tweeting: "Wow, I cannot believe this. Rip my brother juice world". Lil Uzi Vert, Drake, and the Weeknd also gave condolences.

His mother expressed hope that his legacy would help others in their battles with addiction, saying it "knows no boundaries, and its impact goes beyond the person fighting it...We know that Jarad's legacy of love, joy and emotional honesty will live on." She established the Live Free 999 Fund later in honor of Higgins and the battle he fought against addiction, anxiety, and depression. The fund's primary goal is to support programs that target young and underserved populations. With a focus on addiction, anxiety and depression, the organization hopes to normalize the conversation about the mental health challenges that Higgins faced, and provide an avenue for people to process those challenges in a healthy way. Higgins's production team and record label have committed to supporting the organization.

At the time of his death, it was reported that Higgins had taken the pills in an attempt to hide them from law enforcement officers; however, his videographer, Chris Long, said that Higgins "did not swallow a bunch of pills because the police were at the airport. We gave no fucks about them being there. He could have flushed them down the toilet if he cared".

On December 16, 2021, Juice Wrld: Into the Abyss was released on HBO Max as a part of the Music Box series. The film spotlights Higgins's struggles with mental health and substance abuse through the use of archival footage, in addition to interviews with Higgins's friends, family, and associates.

In November 2026, Rockstar Games paid homage to Higgins in Grand Theft Auto VI with an NPC that resembled him and went by the online username "@badlife999" on the in-game app "Snapmactic".

== Discography ==
Studio albums

- Goodbye & Good Riddance (2018)
- Death Race for Love (2019)
- Legends Never Die (2020)
- Fighting Demons (2021)
- The Party Never Ends (2024)

== Filmography ==
=== Film ===
Year	Title	Role	Notes	Ref.
2021	Juice Wrld: Into the Abyss	Himself (archival footage)	Documentary	
2024	Kids Are Growing Up: A Story About a Kid Named LAROI	Himself (archival footage)	Documentary	

=== Video games ===
Year	Title	Role	Notes	Ref.
2024	Fortnite Battle Royale	Himself (likeness)	playable character and virtual concert	

== Tours ==
- The Nicki Wrld Tour with Nicki Minaj (2019)
- The Death Race for Love Tour with Ski Mask the Slump God and contribution from Lyrical Lemonade (2019)

== Awards and nominations ==
=== American Music Awards ===
Year	Nominee / work	Award	Result	Ref.
2020	Himself	Favorite Male Artist – Rap/Hip Hop	Won	
2021	Legends Never Die	Favorite Album – Hip Hop	Nominated	

=== Berlin Music Video Awards ===
Year	Nominee / work	Award	Result	Ref.
2020	Hate Me	Best VFX	Nominated	

=== BET Awards ===
Year	Nominee / work	Award	Result	Ref.
2019	Himself	Best New Artist	Nominated	

=== BET Hip Hop Awards ===
Year	Nominee / work	Award	Result	Ref.
2018	Himself	Best New Hip Hop Artist	Nominated	

=== Billboard Music Awards ===
Year	Nominee / work	Award	Result	Ref.
2019	Himself	Top New Artist	Won	
2019	Himself	Top Rap Artist	Nominated	
2019	"Lucid Dreams"	Top Hot 100 Song	Nominated	
2019	"Lucid Dreams"	Top Streaming Song (Audio)	Nominated	
2019	"Lucid Dreams"	Top Streaming Song (Video)	Nominated	
2019	"Lucid Dreams"	Top Rap Song	Nominated	
2020	Death Race for Love	Top Rap Album	Nominated	
2020	Himself	Top Rap Artist	Nominated	
2021	Himself	Top Artist	Nominated	
2021	Himself	Top Male Artist	Nominated	
2021	Himself	Top Billboard 200 Artist	Nominated	
2021	Himself	Top Rap Artist	Nominated	
2021	Himself	Top Rap Male Artist	Nominated	
2021	Legends Never Die	Top Billboard 200 Album	Nominated	
2021	Legends Never Die	Top Rap Album	Nominated	

=== iHeartRadio Music Awards ===
Year	Nominee / work	Award	Result	Ref.
2020	Death Race for Love	Best Hip-Hop Album	Won	

=== MTV Video Music Awards ===
Year	Nominee / work	Award	Result	Ref.
2018	"Lucid Dreams"	Song of Summer	Nominated	
2020	"Godzilla" (with Eminem)	Video of the Year	Nominated	
2020	"Godzilla" (with Eminem)	Best Hip Hop	Nominated	
