= Billboard Year-End Hot R&B/Hip-Hop Songs of 2019 =

American music chart

This is a list of Billboard magazine's Top Hot R&B/Hip-Hop Songs of 2019.

No.	Title	Artist(s)
1	"Old Town Road"	Lil Nas X featuring Billy Ray Cyrus
2	"Sunflower"	Post Malone and Swae Lee
3	"Talk"	Khalid
4	"Wow"	Post Malone
5	"Truth Hurts"	Lizzo
6	"Sicko Mode"	Travis Scott
7	"No Guidance"	Chris Brown featuring Drake
8	"Middle Child"	J. Cole
9	"Going Bad"	Meek Mill featuring Drake
10	"Ransom"	Lil Tecca
11	"Suge"	DaBaby
12	"Better"	Khalid
13	"Goodbyes"	Post Malone featuring Young Thug
14	"Zeze"	Kodak Black featuring Travis Scott and Offset
15	"Money in the Grave"	Drake featuring Rick Ross
16	"Drip Too Hard"	Lil Baby and Gunna
17	"Please Me"	Cardi B and Bruno Mars
18	"Money"	Cardi B
19	"A Lot"	21 Savage featuring J. Cole
20	"Panini"	Lil Nas X
21	"Thotiana"	Blueface
22	"Pop Out"	Polo G featuring Lil Tjay
23	"Wake Up in the Sky"	Gucci Mane, Bruno Mars and Kodak Black
24	"Pure Water"	Mustard and Migos
25	"Look Back at It"	A Boogie wit da Hoodie
26	"Mo Bamba"	Sheck Wes
27	"Envy Me"	Calboy
28	"Act Up"	City Girls
29	"The London"	Young Thug featuring J. Cole and Travis Scott
30	"Murder on My Mind"	YNW Melly
31	"Leave Me Alone"	Flipp Dinero
32	"My Type"	Saweetie
33	"Worth It"	YK Osiris
34	"Better Now"	Post Malone
35	"Close Friends"	Lil Baby
36	"Clout"	Offset featuring Cardi B
37	"Swervin"	A Boogie wit da Hoodie featuring 6ix9ine
38	"Baby"	Lil Baby and DaBaby
39	"Trip"	Ella Mai
40	"Shotta Flow"	NLE Choppa
41	"Cash Shit"	Megan Thee Stallion featuring DaBaby
42	"Hot Girl Summer"	Megan Thee Stallion featuring Nicki Minaj and Ty Dolla Sign
43	"Robbery"	Juice Wrld
44	"Lucid Dreams"	Juice Wrld
45	"Go Loko"	YG featuring Tyga and Jon Z
46	"Earfquake"	Tyler, the Creator
47	"Good as Hell"	Lizzo
48	"Girls Need Love"	Summer Walker
49	"Mixed Personalities"	YNW Melly featuring Kanye West
50	"On Chill"	Wale featuring Jeremih
51	"Sanguine Paradise"	Lil Uzi Vert
52	"Hot"	Young Thug featuring Gunna
53	"Put a Date on It"	Yo Gotti featuring Lil Baby
54	"Armed and Dangerous"	Juice Wrld
55	"Press"	Cardi B
56	"Calling My Spirit"	Kodak Black
57	"Twerk"	City Girls featuring Cardi B
58	"Ballin'"	Mustard featuring Roddy Ricch
59	"Backin' It Up"	Pardison Fontaine featuring Cardi B
60	"Uproar"	Lil Wayne
61	"Pure Cocaine"	Lil Baby
62	"Lalala"	Y2K and bbno$
63	"Wish Wish"	DJ Khaled featuring Cardi B and 21 Savage
64	"Time"	NF
65	"Highest in the Room"	Travis Scott
66	"24/7"	Meek Mill featuring Ella Mai
67	"Big Ole Freak"	Megan Thee Stallion
68	"Just Us"	DJ Khaled featuring SZA
69	"Before I Let Go"	Beyoncé
70	"Saturday Nights"	Khalid and Kane Brown
71	"Racks in the Middle"	Nipsey Hussle featuring Roddy Ricch and Hit-Boy
72	"Arms Around You"	XXXTentacion and Lil Pump featuring Maluma and Swae Lee
73	"Shot Clock"	Ella Mai
74	"Baby Sitter"	DaBaby featuring Offset
75	"Playing Games"	Summer Walker
76	"Bad!"	XXXTentacion
77	"Undecided"	Chris Brown
78	"Talk to Me"	Tory Lanez and Rich the Kid
79	"Faucet Failure"	Ski Mask the Slump God
80	"It's You"	Ali Gatie
81	"223's"	YNW Melly featuring 9lokkNine
82	"Bandit"	Juice Wrld and YoungBoy Never Broke Again
83	"Heat"	Chris Brown featuring Gunna
84	"Enemies"	Post Malone featuring DaBaby
85	"Homicide"	Logic featuring Eminem
86	"Dangerous"	Meek Mill featuring Jeremih and PnB Rock
87	"No Stylist"	French Montana featuring Drake
88	"Ring"	Cardi B featuring Kehlani
89	"F.N"	Lil Tjay
90	"Juice"	Lizzo
91	"You"	Jacquees
92	"Rodeo"	Lil Nas X and Cardi B or Nas
93	"Camelot"	NLE Choppa
94	"Nights Like This"	Kehlani featuring Ty Dolla Sign
95	"Tap"	Nav featuring Meek Mill
96	"Hot Girl Bummer"	Blackbear
97	"Bad Bad Bad"	Young Thug featuring Lil Baby
98	"Intro"	DaBaby
99	"Lost in the Fire"	Gesaffelstein and The Weeknd
100	"I"	Lil Skies

== See also ==
- 2019 in music
- Billboard Year-End Hot 100 singles of 2019
- Billboard Year-End Hot Rap Songs of 2019
- List of number-one R&B/hip-hop songs of 2019 (U.S.)
