= Billboard Year-End Hot Rap Songs of 2019 =

American music chart

This is a list of Billboard magazine's Top Hot Rap Songs of 2019.

No.	Title	Artist(s)
1	"Old Town Road"	Lil Nas X featuring Billy Ray Cyrus
2	"Sunflower"	Post Malone and Swae Lee
3	"Wow"	Post Malone
4	"Truth Hurts"	Lizzo
5	"Sicko Mode"	Travis Scott
6	"Middle Child"	J. Cole
7	"Going Bad"	Meek Mill featuring Drake
8	"Ransom"	Lil Tecca
9	"Suge"	DaBaby
10	"Goodbyes"	Post Malone featuring Young Thug
11	"Zeze"	Kodak Black featuring Travis Scott and Offset
12	"Money in the Grave"	Drake featuring Rick Ross
13	"Drip Too Hard"	Lil Baby and Gunna
14	"Please Me"	Cardi B and Bruno Mars
15	"Money"	Migos featuring Nicki Minaj and Cardi B
16	"A Lot"	21 Savage featuring J. Cole
17	"Panini"	Lil Nas X
18	"Thotiana"	Blueface
19	"Pop Out"	Polo G featuring Lil Tjay
20	"Wake Up in the Sky"	Gucci Mane, Bruno Mars and Kodak Black
21	"Mo Bamba"	Sheck Wes
22	"Pure Water"	Mustard and Migos
23	"Look Back at It"	A Boogie wit da Hoodie
24	"The London"	Young Thug featuring J. Cole and Travis Scott
25	"Act Up"	City Girls
26	"Envy Me"	Calboy
27	"Murder on My Mind"	YNW Melly
28	"Leave Me Alone"	Flipp Dinero
29	"Better Now"	Post Malone
30	"My Type"	Saweetie
31	"Worth It"	YK Osiris
32	"Swervin"	A Boogie wit da Hoodie featuring 6ix9ine
33	"Baby"	Lil Baby and Da Baby
34	"Clout"	Offset and Cardi B
35	"Hot Girl Summer"	Megan Thee Stallion featuring Nicki Minaj and Ty Dolla Sign
36	"Lucid Dreams"	Juice Wrld
37	"Cash"	Drake
38	"Hot"	Young Thug featuring Gunna
39	"On Chill"	Wale featuring Jeremih
40	"Close Friends"	Lil Baby
41	"Go Loko"	YG featuring Tyga and Jon Z
42	"Shotta Flow"	NLE Choppa
43	"Highest in the Room"	Travis Scott
44	"Uproar"	Lil Wayne
45	"Robbery"	Juice Wrld
46	"Press"	Cardi B
47	"Backin' It Up"	Pardison Fontaine featuring Cardi B
48	"Twerk"	City Girls featuring Cardi B
49	"Time"	NF
50	"Mixed Personalities"	YNW Melly featuring Kanye West

== See also ==
- 2019 in music
- Billboard Year-End Hot 100 singles of 2019
- Billboard Year-End Hot R&B/Hip-Hop Songs of 2019
- List of Billboard number-one rap singles of 2019
