= Billboard Year-End Hot 100 singles of 2019 =

Ranking of recorded music

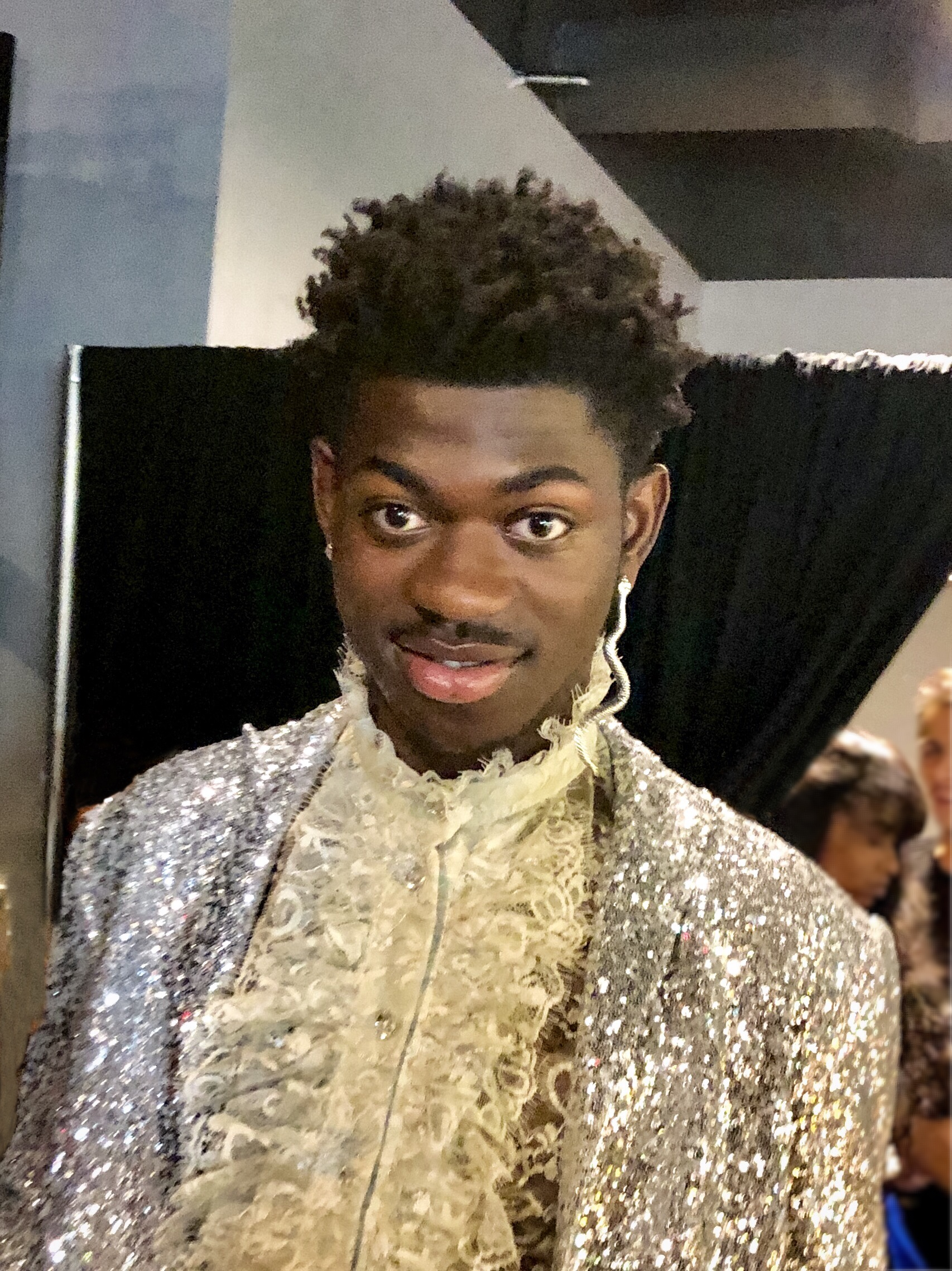
"Old Town Road" by Lil Nas X featuring Billy Ray Cyrus, the best-performing single of 2019, broke the record for the most weeks spent at number one by any song in Billboard Hot 100 history, at eighteen weeks (a nineteenth was clocked before the Billy Ray Cyrus remix was released, and thus was credited only to Lil Nas X).

The Billboard Hot 100 is a chart that ranks the best-performing singles of the United States. Its data, published by Billboard magazine and compiled by Nielsen SoundScan, is based collectively on each single's weekly physical and digital sales, as well as airplay and streaming. At the end of a year, Billboard will publish an annual list of the 100 most successful songs throughout that year on the Hot 100 chart based on the information. For 2019, the list was published on December 5, calculated with data from November 24, 2018, to November 16, 2019.

Post Malone ranked as Billboard's top Hot 100 artist of 2019. Of his five songs on the list, "Sunflower" (with Swae Lee) ranked the highest, as the number-two song of the year.

== Year-end list ==
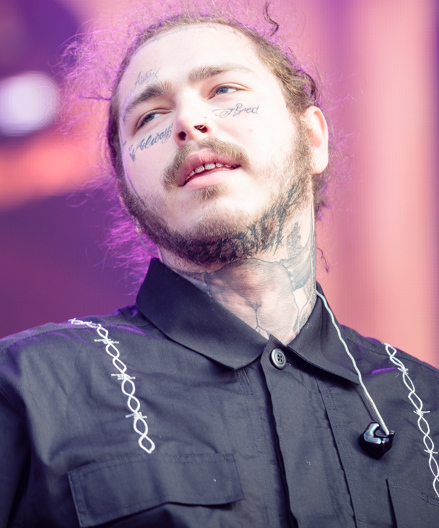
Five songs from Post Malone appear on the list, with "Sunflower" (with Swae Lee) at number 2, "Wow" at number 5, "Goodbyes" (featuring Young Thug) at number 30, "Better Now" at number 32, and "Circles" at number 62.

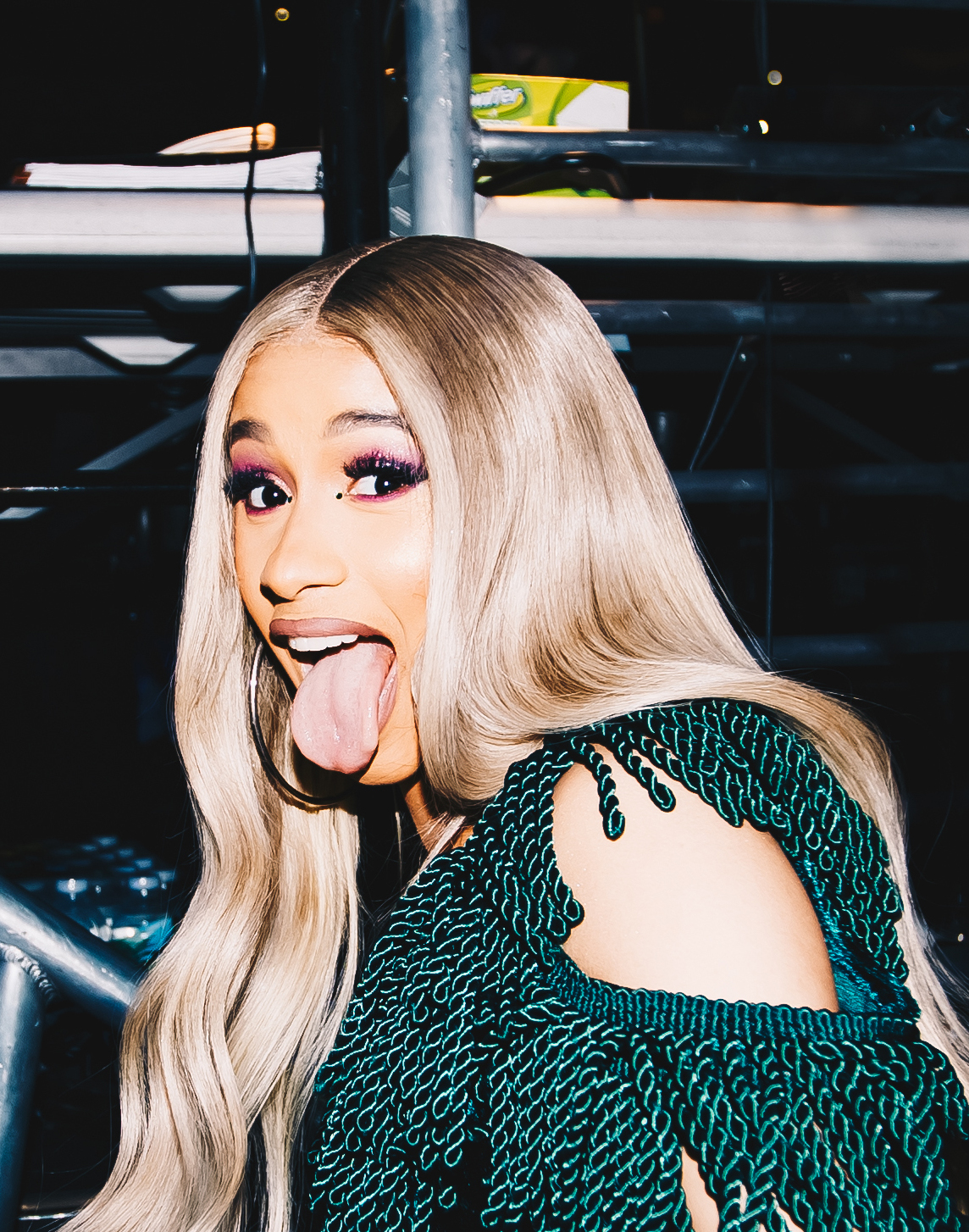
Cardi B has the most appearances of any artist on the list with six songs, three of which appear in the top 40 with "Girls Like You" (Maroon 5 featuring Cardi B), "Please Me" (with Bruno Mars), and "Money" at number 22, number 37, and number 38 respectively.

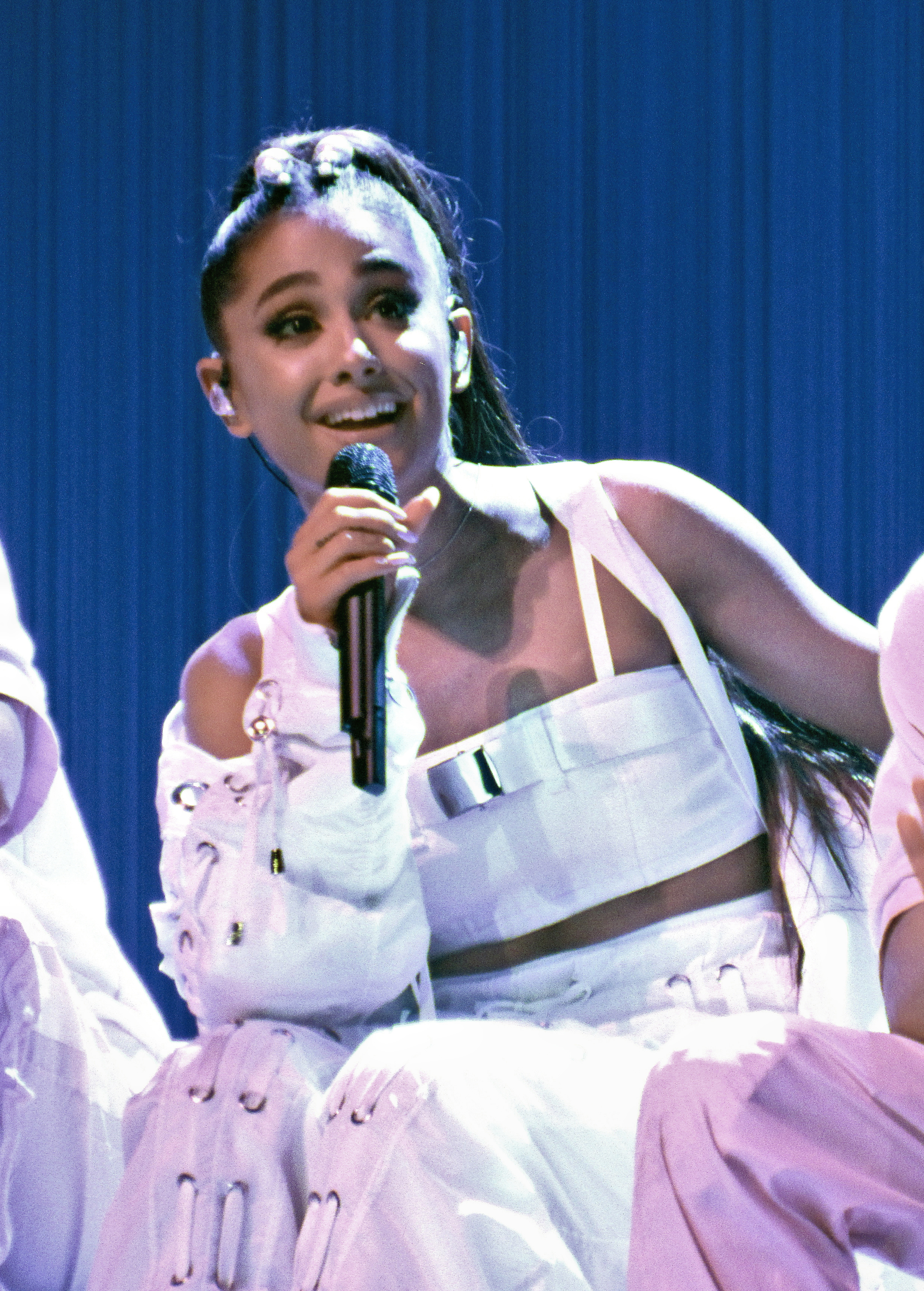
Ariana Grande has five songs on the list, with three songs from her fifth studio album Thank U, Next placing in the top 40. "7 Rings" ranks at number 7, "Thank U, Next" ranks at number 12, and "Break Up with Your Girlfriend, I'm Bored" ranks at number 36.

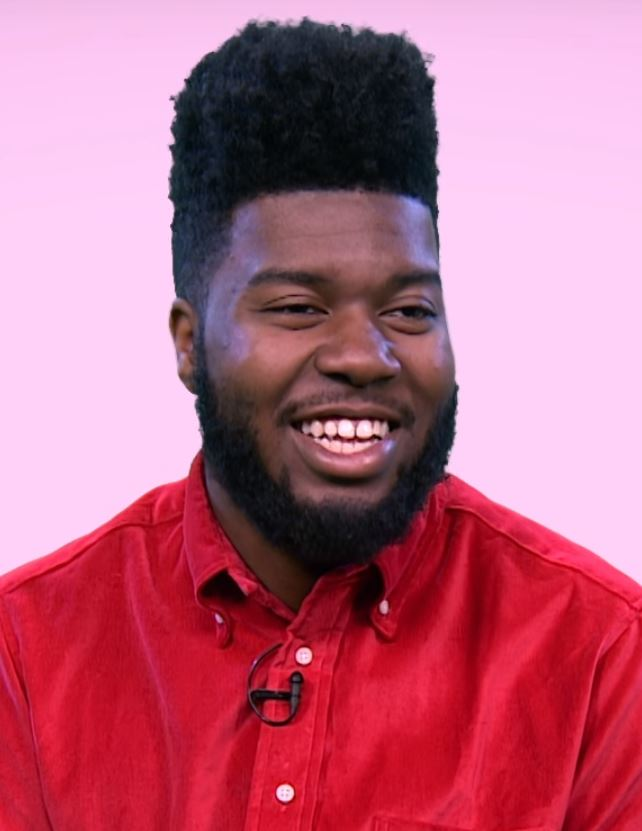
Khalid appears on five songs on the list, three of which are in the top 20 with "Talk" at number 8, "Eastside (with Benny Blanco and Halsey) at number 17, and "Better" at number 20.

List of songs on Billboard's 2019 Year-End Hot 100 chart
No.	Title	Artist(s)
1	"Old Town Road"	Lil Nas X featuring Billy Ray Cyrus
2	"Sunflower"	Post Malone and Swae Lee
3	"Without Me"	Halsey
4	"Bad Guy"	Billie Eilish
5	"Wow"	Post Malone
6	"Happier"	Marshmello and Bastille
7	"7 Rings"	Ariana Grande
8	"Talk"	Khalid
9	"Sicko Mode"	Travis Scott
10	"Sucker"	Jonas Brothers
11	"High Hopes"	Panic! at the Disco
12	"Thank U, Next"	Ariana Grande
13	"Truth Hurts"	Lizzo
14	"Dancing with a Stranger"	Sam Smith and Normani
15	"Señorita"	Shawn Mendes and Camila Cabello
16	"I Don't Care"	Ed Sheeran and Justin Bieber
17	"Eastside"	Benny Blanco, Halsey and Khalid
18	"Going Bad"	Meek Mill featuring Drake
19	"Shallow"	Lady Gaga and Bradley Cooper
20	"Better"	Khalid
21	"No Guidance"	Chris Brown featuring Drake
22	"Girls Like You"	Maroon 5 featuring Cardi B
23	"Sweet but Psycho"	Ava Max
24	"Suge"	DaBaby
25	"Middle Child"	J. Cole
26	"Drip Too Hard"	Lil Baby and Gunna
27	"Someone You Loved"	Lewis Capaldi
28	"Ransom"	Lil Tecca
29	"If I Can't Have You"	Shawn Mendes
30	"Goodbyes"	Post Malone featuring Young Thug
31	"Zeze"	Kodak Black featuring Travis Scott and Offset
32	"Better Now"	Post Malone
33	"Youngblood"	5 Seconds of Summer
34	"Money in the Grave"	Drake featuring Rick Ross
35	"Speechless"	Dan + Shay
36	"Break Up with Your Girlfriend, I'm Bored"	Ariana Grande
37	"Please Me"	Cardi B and Bruno Mars
38	"Money"	Cardi B
39	"You Need to Calm Down"	Taylor Swift
40	"Panini"	Lil Nas X
41	"Look Back at It"	A Boogie wit da Hoodie
42	"A Lot"	21 Savage
43	"Me!"	Taylor Swift featuring Brendon Urie
44	"Mia"	Bad Bunny featuring Drake
45	"Pop Out"	Polo G featuring Lil Tjay
46	"Beautiful Crazy"	Luke Combs
47	"Thotiana"	Blueface
48	"Lucid Dreams"	Juice Wrld
49	"Mo Bamba"	Sheck Wes
50	"Beautiful People"	Ed Sheeran featuring Khalid
51	"Wake Up in the Sky"	Gucci Mane, Bruno Mars and Kodak Black
52	"Whiskey Glasses"	Morgan Wallen
53	"God's Country"	Blake Shelton
54	"Be Alright"	Dean Lewis
55	"Pure Water"	Mustard and Migos
56	"The Git Up"	Blanco Brown
57	"Taki Taki"	DJ Snake featuring Selena Gomez, Ozuna and Cardi B
58	"Close to Me"	Ellie Goulding and Diplo featuring Swae Lee
59	"Envy Me"	Calboy
60	"You Say"	Lauren Daigle
61	"Hey Look Ma, I Made It"	Panic! at the Disco
62	"Circles"	Post Malone
63	"Beer Never Broke My Heart"	Luke Combs
64	"The London"	Young Thug, J. Cole and Travis Scott
65	"Con Calma"	Daddy Yankee and Katy Perry featuring Snow
66	"Murder on My Mind"	YNW Melly
67	"When the Party's Over"	Billie Eilish
68	"Act Up"	City Girls
69	"I Like It"	Cardi B, Bad Bunny and J Balvin
70	"Trampoline"	Shaed
71	"Leave Me Alone"	Flipp Dinero
72	"Breathin"	Ariana Grande
73	"Bury a Friend"	Billie Eilish
74	"Close Friends"	Lil Baby
75	"Baby Shark"	Pinkfong
76	"My Type"	Saweetie
77	"Worth It"	YK Osiris
78	"Only Human"	Jonas Brothers
79	"Knockin' Boots"	Luke Bryan
80	"Trip"	Ella Mai
81	"Rumor"	Lee Brice
82	"Swervin"	A Boogie wit da Hoodie featuring 6ix9ine
83	"How Do You Sleep?"	Sam Smith
84	"Baby"	Lil Baby and DaBaby
85	"Look What God Gave Her"	Thomas Rhett
86	"Good as You"	Kane Brown
87	"Clout"	Offset featuring Cardi B
88	"Love Lies"	Khalid and Normani
89	"One Thing Right"	Marshmello and Kane Brown
90	"Cash Shit"	Megan Thee Stallion featuring DaBaby
91	"Tequila"	Dan + Shay
92	"Shotta Flow"	NLE Choppa
93	"Hot Girl Summer"	Megan Thee Stallion featuring Nicki Minaj and Ty Dolla Sign
94	"Talk You Out of It"	Florida Georgia Line
95	"Beautiful"	Bazzi featuring Camila Cabello
96	"Eyes on You"	Chase Rice
97	"All to Myself"	Dan + Shay
98	"Boyfriend"	Ariana Grande and Social House
99	"Walk Me Home"	Pink
100	"Robbery"	Juice Wrld

== See also ==
- 2019 in American music
- Billboard Year-End Hot R&B/Hip-Hop Songs of 2019
- Billboard Year-End Hot Rap Songs of 2019
- List of Billboard Hot 100 number-one singles of 2019
- List of Billboard Hot 100 top 10 singles in 2019
