= List of Billboard number-one R&B/hip-hop albums of 2019 =

This page lists the albums that reached number-one on the overall Top R&B/Hip-Hop Albums chart, the R&B Albums chart (which was re-created in 2013), and the Rap Albums chart in 2019. The R&B Albums and Rap Albums charts partly serve as distillations of the overall R&B/Hip-Hop Albums chart.

== List of number ones ==
Key
†	Indicates best-performing album of 2019

Issue date	R&B/Hip-Hop Albums	Artist(s)	R&B Albums	Artist(s)	Rap Albums	Artist(s)	Refs.
January 5	I Am > I Was	21 Savage	The Christmas Song	Nat King Cole	I Am > I Was	21 Savage	
January 12	I Am > I Was	21 Savage	Ella Mai	Ella Mai	I Am > I Was	21 Savage	
January 19	Hoodie SZN	A Boogie wit da Hoodie	Ella Mai	Ella Mai	Hoodie SZN	A Boogie wit da Hoodie	
January 26	Hoodie SZN	A Boogie wit da Hoodie	Suncity	Khalid	Hoodie SZN	A Boogie wit da Hoodie	
February 2	The Wizrd	Future	Ella Mai	Ella Mai	The Wizrd	Future	
February 9	The Wizrd	Future	Ella Mai	Ella Mai	The Wizrd	Future	
February 16	Hoodie SZN	A Boogie wit da Hoodie	Ella Mai	Ella Mai	Hoodie SZN	A Boogie wit da Hoodie	
February 23	Hoodie SZN	A Boogie wit da Hoodie	H.E.R.	H.E.R.	Hoodie SZN	A Boogie wit da Hoodie	
March 2	So Far Gone	Drake	Ella Mai	Ella Mai	So Far Gone	Drake	
March 9	Drip or Drown 2	Gunna	While We Wait	Kehlani	Drip or Drown 2	Gunna	
March 16	Rap or Go to the League	2 Chainz	When I Get Home	Solange	Rap or Go to the League	2 Chainz	
March 23	Death Race for Love	Juice Wrld	Ella Mai	Ella Mai	Death Race for Love	Juice Wrld	
March 30	Death Race for Love	Juice Wrld	Ella Mai	Ella Mai	Death Race for Love	Juice Wrld	
April 6	Bad Habits	Nav	American Teen	Khalid	Bad Habits	Nav	
April 13	Victory Lap	Nipsey Hussle	American Teen	Khalid	Victory Lap	Nipsey Hussle	
April 20	Free Spirit	Khalid	Free Spirit	Khalid	Victory Lap	Nipsey Hussle	
April 27	Free Spirit	Khalid	Free Spirit	Khalid	Victory Lap	Nipsey Hussle	
May 4	Free Spirit	Khalid	Free Spirit	Khalid	Victory Lap	Nipsey Hussle	
May 11	Crash Talk	Schoolboy Q	Free Spirit	Khalid	Crash Talk	Schoolboy Q	
May 18	Free Spirit	Khalid	Free Spirit	Khalid	TrapStar Turnt PopStar	PnB Rock	
May 25	Confessions of a Dangerous Mind	Logic	Free Spirit	Khalid	Confessions of a Dangerous Mind	Logic	
June 1	Igor	Tyler, the Creator	Free Spirit	Khalid	Igor	Tyler, the Creator	
June 8	Father of Asahd	DJ Khaled	Free Spirit	Khalid	Father of Asahd	DJ Khaled	
June 15	Father of Asahd	DJ Khaled	Free Spirit	Khalid	Father of Asahd	DJ Khaled	
June 22	Save Me	Future	Free Spirit	Khalid	Save Me	Future	
June 29	Free Spirit	Khalid	Free Spirit	Khalid	Die a Legend	Polo G	
July 6	7	Lil Nas X	Free Spirit	Khalid	7	Lil Nas X	
July 13	Indigo	Chris Brown	Indigo	Chris Brown	7	Lil Nas X	
July 20	Revenge of the Dreamers III	Dreamville and J. Cole	Indigo	Chris Brown	Revenge of the Dreamers III	Dreamville and J. Cole	
July 27	Revenge of the Dreamers III	Dreamville and J. Cole	Indigo	Chris Brown	Revenge of the Dreamers III	Dreamville and J. Cole	
August 3	The Lion King: The Gift	Beyoncé and various artists	The Lion King: The Gift	Beyoncé and various artists	7	Lil Nas X	
August 10	The Search	NF	Indigo	Chris Brown	The Search	NF	
August 17	Care Package	Drake	Indigo	Chris Brown	Care Package	Drake	
August 24	Port of Miami 2	Rick Ross	Indigo	Chris Brown	Port of Miami 2	Rick Ross	
August 31	So Much Fun	Young Thug	Hello from Las Vegas	Lionel Richie	So Much Fun	Young Thug	
September 7	So Much Fun	Young Thug	Indigo	Chris Brown	So Much Fun	Young Thug	
September 14	We Love You Tecca	Lil Tecca	Indigo	Chris Brown	We Love You Tecca	Lil Tecca	
September 21	Hollywood's Bleeding	Post Malone	Indigo	Chris Brown	Hollywood's Bleeding	Post Malone	
September 28	Hollywood's Bleeding	Post Malone	Indigo	Chris Brown	Hollywood's Bleeding	Post Malone	
October 5	Hollywood's Bleeding	Post Malone	Indigo	Chris Brown	Hollywood's Bleeding	Post Malone	
October 12	Kirk	DaBaby	Indigo	Chris Brown	Kirk	DaBaby	
October 19	Over It	Summer Walker	Over It	Summer Walker	Hollywood's Bleeding	Post Malone	
October 26	AI YoungBoy 2	YoungBoy Never Broke Again	Over It	Summer Walker	AI YoungBoy 2	YoungBoy Never Broke Again	
November 2	Hollywood's Bleeding	Post Malone	Over It	Summer Walker	Hollywood's Bleeding	Post Malone	
November 9	Jesus Is King	Kanye West	Over It	Summer Walker	Jesus Is King	Kanye West	
November 16	Hollywood's Bleeding	Post Malone	Over It	Summer Walker	Hollywood's Bleeding	Post Malone	
November 23	Hollywood's Bleeding	Post Malone	Over It	Summer Walker	Hollywood's Bleeding	Post Malone	
November 30	Chixtape 5	Tory Lanez	Chixtape 5	Tory Lanez	Hollywood's Bleeding	Post Malone	
December 7	A Love Letter to You 4	Trippie Redd	Over It	Summer Walker	A Love Letter to You 4	Trippie Redd	
December 14	Hollywood's Bleeding	Post Malone	Merry Christmas	Mariah Carey	Hollywood's Bleeding	Post Malone	
December 21	Please Excuse Me for Being Antisocial	Roddy Ricch	Merry Christmas	Mariah Carey	Please Excuse Me for Being Antisocial	Roddy Ricch	
December 28	Please Excuse Me for Being Antisocial	Roddy Ricch	Merry Christmas	Mariah Carey	Please Excuse Me for Being Antisocial	Roddy Ricch	

== See also ==
- 2019 in music
- List of Billboard 200 number-one albums of 2019
- List of number-one R&B/hip-hop songs of 2019 (U.S.)
