= Father of Four =

Father of Four or Father of 4 may refer to:

- Father of Four (film), a 1953 Danish family comedy directed by Alice O'Fredericks and starring Ib Schønberg and Birgitte Bruun.
- Father of 4 (album), a 2019 solo studio album by American rapper Offset.
