= Death Race for Love =

2019 studio album by Juice Wrld

Studio album by Juice Wrld
- Released: March 8, 2019
- Recorded: 2018–2019
- Genres: Hip hop; rock; emo rap
- Length: 72:04
- Labels: Grade A; Interscope
- Producers: Andrew Watt; Boi-1da; Brent Faiyaz; Cardo; Camden Bench; DY Krazy; Frank Dukes; G. Ry; Hit-Boy; Jahaan Sweet; Louis Bell; Nick Mira; No I.D.; Paperboy Fabe; Power; Purps; Rex Kudo; Rvssian; Tommy Brown; Tone; Yung Exclusive

Juice Wrld chronology
Wrld on Drugs (2018)	Death Race for Love (2019)	Legends Never Die (2020)

Singles from Death Race for Love
- 1. "Robbery" Released: February 13, 2019; 2. "Hear Me Calling" Released: March 1, 2019; 3. "Bandit" Released: October 4, 2019 (Note: Single not included on the original release.)

Death Race for Love is the second studio album by American rapper Juice Wrld and the last to be released during his lifetime. It was released on March 8, 2019, by Grade A Productions and Interscope Records. The production on the album was handled by multiple producers including Nick Mira, Boi-1da, Hit-Boy, No I.D., Frank Dukes, and Tommy Brown, among others. The album features guest appearances from Brent Faiyaz, Rvssian, Clever, and Young Thug. The bonus track edition features the 2019 single "Bandit", with an appearance from rapper YoungBoy Never Broke Again.

Death Race for Love includes the Nick Mira-produced lead single, "Robbery", which was released on February 13, and the Purps-produced "Hear Me Calling", which was released on March 1. While the album received a generally lukewarm response from critics, it was a commercial success. It debuted at number one on the US Billboard 200, earning 165,000 album-equivalent units in its first week. It became Juice Wrld's first US number-one album. In October 2021, the album was certified double platinum by the Recording Industry Association of America (RIAA).

== Promotion ==
On February 7, 2019, Juice Wrld announced the album on Twitter, writing: "I'm losing my mind and loving every minute of it... Just in time for the drop of the album... MARCH 8th..." On February 20, Juice Wrld revealed that he would be headlining a North America concert tour in support of the album with fellow rapper Ski Mask the Slump God. On March 4, he revealed the official tracklist for the album. Juice Wrld appeared on The Tonight Show Starring Jimmy Fallon to perform "Hear Me Calling" on April 8.

=== Singles ===
The album's lead single, "Robbery", was released on February 13, 2019. The song was produced by Nick Mira and peaked at number 27 on the US Billboard Hot 100. The album's second single, "Hear Me Calling", was released on March 1, 2019. The song was produced by Purps and peaked at number 38 on the Hot 100 following the album's release.

== Artwork and title ==
The album's artwork and title are inspired by the Twisted Metal series of video games for the original PlayStation console.

== Critical reception ==
Professional ratings
Aggregate scores
Source	Rating
AnyDecentMusic?	5.4/10
Metacritic	61/100
Review scores
Source	Rating
AllMusic	2.5/5 stars
Consequence	C
The Guardian	3/5 stars
HipHopDX	3.9/5
HotNewHipHop	69%
NME	4/5 stars
Pitchfork	6.8/10
PopMatters	4/10
RapReviews	6.5/10
Rolling Stone	3.5/5 stars

Death Race for Love was met with a mixed reception. At Metacritic, which assigns a normalized rating out of 100 to reviews from professional publications, the album received an average score of 61, based on 11 reviews. Aggregator AnyDecentMusic? gave it 5.4 out of 10, based on their assessment of the critical consensus.

Reviewers generally praised the album's sound and blend of genres. Thomas Hobbs of NME gave a positive 4 star (out of 5) review, stating "Juice Wrld is far less indulgent than XXX[Tentacion], not getting lost in the idea that he's a messianic creative. This will be the moment that solidifies his status as one of rap's most exciting new stars". Scott Glaysher of HipHopDX gave the album a 3.9 out of 5, and argued that; "Genre-blending albums (no matter how commonplace they might be these days) are not easy to pull off and for that, Juice Wrld should be given credit. From the seemingly sincere lyrics to the equally candid delivery, Juice truly goes with his gut in whichever way (rap, sing, hum, sob)".

Most reviewers, however, took issues with the album's length and what was seen as poor writing, even in positive reviews. Pitchfork's Alphonse Pierre wrote, "Fifty percent of the lyrics are bad ("Back on my bullshit, devil emoji") and the other 50 percent are also bad, but then they get stuck in your head and ultimately turn good ("Tell me your darkest secret shit you wouldn't even tell Jesus"). ... Death Race For Love feels like the real Juice Wrld, wearing his influences and heart on his sleeve, putting his ups and downs into the music in real time", and gave the album a 6.8 out of 10. Danny Schwartz of Rolling Stone said in his 3 and half star (out of 5) review that, "Death Race succeeded in its most fundamental mission, which was to prove that "Lucid Dreams" was not a fluke. Songs like "Fast", "Ring, Ring", "Hear Me Calling" strike a dynamic balance of raw charisma and profound anxiety... While his melodrama tends to grow old over the course of a 22-track, 72-minute album, it is captivating in small doses". The Guardian's Kate Hutchinson stated: "It's slim on features (only Young Thug, Clever and Brent Faiyaz) but big on misanthropic head-nodders that put Juice's Fall Out Boy-style whine or raspy flow to the fore: he is more versatile than his peers and also more gifted... But ultimately, the suicide references of songs such as Empty and casual misogyny in the tauntingly violent Syphilis leave an uncomfortable taste.", and gave the album 3 stars out of 5. Steve "Flash" Juon of RapReviews said at the end of his 6.5 out of 10 review that while he enjoyed the "catchy tunes" at times, that it was "hard to call them rap songs and even harder to ignore the subtext that drugs are both the cause of and solution to his problems. Irresponsible abuse of powerful narcotics or prescription medications solves nothing. It's easy to pretend Juice WRLD is just a fiction [sic] character Jarad Higgins portrays for the sake of music, but too many of his peers have died over the years for me to safely assume it's all just a gimmick."

PopMatters critic Mike Schiller said, "The ratio of bangers to duds...is not great, and Death Race for Love feels an awful lot like an unabridged teenage diary; while the occasional clever turn of phrase and moment of profundity is sure to bubble up, most of it is simple self-indulgence, an onslaught of pure emotion whose sincerity is never in question, but all of which starts to blur together after a mere few pages or songs". Fred Thomas was also critical of the album in the review for AllMusic, stating "There's no shortage of highlights, but the lack of editing or focus means every song goes on a little too long and leads to another one that struggles to connect stylistically or emotionally".

=== Year-end lists ===
Select year-end rankings of Death Race for Love
Publication	List	Rank	Ref.
NME	The 50 Best Albums of 2019	49	
Rolling Stone	50 Best Albums of 2019	40	
Uproxx	The Best Albums of 2019	50	

=== Industry awards ===
Awards and nominations for Death Race for Love
Year	Award	Category	Result	Ref.
2020	Billboard Music Awards	Top Rap Album	Nominated	
2020	iHeart Radio Music Awards	Hip-Hop Album of the Year	Won	

== Commercial performance ==
Death Race for Love debuted at number one on the US Billboard 200 chart, earning 165,000 album-equivalent units (including 43,000 copies in pure album sales) in its first week. This became Juice Wrld's first US number-one album. In its second week, the album remained at number one on the chart, moving an additional 74,000 units. In its third week, the album dropped to number three on the chart, earning another 54,000 units. In its fourth week, the album dropped to number five on the chart, earning 44,000 more units. As of May 2019, the album has earned 515,000 album-equivalent units in the US. On October 29, 2021, the album was certified double platinum by the Recording Industry Association of America (RIAA) for combined sales and album-equivalent units of over two million units in the United States.

== Track listing ==
Death Race for Love track listing
No.	Title	Writer(s)	Producer(s)	Length
1.	"Empty"	Jarad Higgins; Nicholas Mira	Nick Mira	4:08
2.	"Maze"	Higgins; Matthew Samuels	Boi-1da	2:24
3.	"HeMotions"	Higgins; Chauncey Hollis	Hit-Boy	3:07
4.	"Demonz (Interlude)" (featuring Brent Faiyaz)	Higgins; Paris Kirk; Fabbien Nahounou; Atupele Ndisale; Christopher Wood	Paperboy Fabe; Brent Faiyaz	1:35
5.	"Fast"	Higgins; Louis Bell; Adam Feeney; Carl Rosen; Andrew Wotman	Bell; Frank Dukes; Andrew Watt	3:28
6.	"Hear Me Calling"	Higgins; Nathanial Caserta; George Dickinson	Purps	3:09
7.	"Big"	Higgins; Hollis	Hit-Boy	3:44
8.	"Robbery"	Higgins; Mira	Mira	4:00
9.	"Flaws and Sins"	Higgins; Mira	Mira	3:38
10.	"Feeling"	Higgins; Mira	Mira	3:21
11.	"Syphilis"	Higgins; Daveon Jackson; Ronald LaTour	Cardo; Yung Exclusive	2:11
12.	"Who Shot Cupid?"	Higgins; Caserta; Dickinson	Purps	3:34
13.	"Ring Ring" (with Rvssian featuring Clever)	Higgins; Joshua Huie; Tarik Johnston	Rvssian	2:51
14.	"Desire"	Higgins; Caserta; Dickinson	Purps	3:09
15.	"Out My Way"	Higgins; Hollis	Hit-Boy	2:36
16.	"The Bees Knees"	Higgins; Hollis; Ernest Wilson	Hit-Boy; No I.D.; G. Ry	5:25
17.	"On God" (featuring Young Thug)	Higgins; Dwan Avery; Masamune Kudo; Jeffery Williams	DY Krazy; Rex Kudo	4:10
18.	"10 Feet"	Higgins; Camden Bench; Arin Ray	Bench; Ray	3:32
19.	"Won't Let Go"	Higgins; Caserta; Dickinson; Michael Montoya	Purps	3:20
20.	"She's the One"	Higgins; Hollis	Hit-Boy	3:08
21.	"Rider"	Higgins; Brandon Mandolph	Power	3:12
22.	"Make Believe"	Higgins; Tommy Brown; Samuels; Anthony M. Jones	Boi-1da; Brown; Jahaan Sweet; Tone	2:22
Total length:				72:04

Bonus track edition
No.	Title	Writer(s)	Producer(s)	Length
11.	"Bandit" (with YoungBoy Never Broke Again)	Higgins; Kentrell Gaulden; Mira	Mira	3:09
Total length:				75:22

== Personnel ==
Credits adapted from iTunes and Tidal.

- Max Lord – recording (tracks 1–22)
- Jaycen Joshua – mixing (track 1–4, 6–22)
- Manny Marroquin – mixing (track 5)
- Lil Bibby – mixing (track 8)
- Jacob Richards – mixing assistant (track 6)
- Rashawn McLean – mixing assistant (track 6)
- Mike Seaberg – mixing assistant (track 6)
- Colin Leonard – mastering (tracks 1–22)

== Charts ==
=== Weekly charts ===
Chart performance for Death Race for Love
Chart (2019)	Peak position
Australian Albums (ARIA)	8
Austrian Albums (Ö3 Austria)	13
Belgian Albums (Ultratop Flanders)	15
Belgian Albums (Ultratop Wallonia)	76
Canadian Albums (Billboard)	1
Danish Albums (Hitlisten)	4
Dutch Albums (Album Top 100)	3
Finnish Albums (Suomen virallinen lista)	7
French Albums (SNEP)	52
German Albums (Offizielle Top 100)	32
Irish Albums (IRMA)	9
Italian Albums (FIMI)	51
Latvian Albums (LAIPA)	3
Lithuanian Albums (AGATA)	3
New Zealand Albums (RMNZ)	4
Norwegian Albums (VG-lista)	6
Swedish Albums (Sverigetopplistan)	4
Swiss Albums (Schweizer Hitparade)	16
UK Albums (Official Charts)	12
UK R&B Albums (Official Charts)	9
US Billboard 200	1
US Top R&B/Hip-Hop Albums (Billboard)	1

2024 chart performance for Death Race for Love
Chart (2024)	Peak position
Nigerian Albums (TurnTable)	74

=== Year-end charts ===
2019 year-end chart performance for Death Race for Love
Chart (2019)	Position
Australian Albums (ARIA)	73
Belgian Albums (Ultratop Flanders)	109
Canadian Albums (Billboard)	31
Danish Albums (Hitlisten)	48
Dutch Albums (Album Top 100)	55
Icelandic Albums (Plötutíóindi)	54
New Zealand Albums (RMNZ)	46
US Billboard 200	22
US Top R&B/Hip-Hop Albums (Billboard)	13

2020 year-end chart performance for Death Race for Love
Chart (2020)	Position
Australian Albums (ARIA)	78
Belgian Albums (Ultratop Flanders)	70
Canadian Albums (Billboard)	40
Danish Albums (Hitlisten)	50
Dutch Albums (Album Top 100)	36
New Zealand Albums (RMNZ)	46
UK Albums (OCC)	91
US Billboard 200	34
US Top R&B/Hip-Hop Albums (Billboard)	17

2021 year-end chart performance for Death Race for Love
Chart (2021)	Position
Belgian Albums (Ultratop Flanders)	106
Canadian Albums (Billboard)	41
Danish Albums (Hitlisten)	79
Dutch Albums (Album Top 100)	67
US Billboard 200	42
US Top R&B/Hip-Hop Albums (Billboard)	20

2022 year-end chart performance for Death Race for Love
Chart (2022)	Position
Belgian Albums (Ultratop Flanders)	193
US Billboard 200	60
US Top R&B/Hip-Hop Albums (Billboard)	25

2023 year-end chart performance for Death Race for Love
Chart (2023)	Position
US Billboard 200	101
US Top R&B/Hip-Hop Albums (Billboard)	69

=== Decade-end charts ===
Decade-end chart performance for Death Race for Love
Chart (2010–2019)	Position
US Billboard 200	159

== Certifications ==
Certifications for Death Race for Love
Region	Certification	Certified units/sales
Australia (ARIA)	Gold	35,000^{‡}
Denmark (IFPI Danmark)	2× Platinum	40,000^{‡}
Italy (FIMI)	Gold	25,000^{‡}
New Zealand (RMNZ)	2× Platinum	30,000^{‡}
Poland (ZPAV)	Platinum	20,000^{‡}
United Kingdom (BPI)	Platinum	300,000^{‡}
United States (RIAA)	2× Platinum	2,000,000^{‡}
^{‡} Sales+streaming figures based on certification alone.

== See also ==
- List of Billboard 200 number-one albums of 2019
- List of Billboard number-one R&B/hip-hop albums of 2019
