= Love for Guala =

Studio album by Flipp Dinero
- Released: November 22, 2019
- Genre: Hip hop
- Label: We the Best; Cinematic; Epic
- Producer: Based 1; Ben Billions; Cam Beats; Cast Beats; Chronic Cloud; DJ Khaled; Dre Moon; Filthy Plux; Frank Dukes; G Koop; Kyle Junior; NOCAP3; Pale 1080; Pluto Beats; Tay Keith; Young Forever Beats

Flipp Dinero chronology
The Guala Way (2017)	Love for Guala (2019)

Singles from Love for Guala
- 1. "Leave Me Alone" Released: September 4, 2018

Love for Guala is the debut studio album by American rapper Flipp Dinero. It was released through We the Best Music Group/Cinematic Music Group/Epic Records on November 22, 2019, and is the follow-up to his 2017 extended play The Guala Way. It features guest appearances from Jay Critch, Kodak Black, Lil Baby and Rich the Kid. Its lead single "Leave Me Alone" peaked at 20 on the Billboard Hot 100 and was certified platinum by the Recording Industry Association of America.

== Track listing ==
Adapted from TIDAL.

No.	Title	Writer(s)	Producer(s)	Length
1.	"Intro" (featuring Maciej Spons)	Christopher St. Victor; Benjamin Sturdivant; Tung Vu Hong	Based 1; Kyle Junior	2:46
2.	"How I Move" (featuring Lil Baby)	Christopher St. Victor; Dominique Jones; Bilall Ukshini; Ermal Ademi; Kyle Stemberger; Osman Osmani	Pluto Beats	3:44
3.	"Fritolays" (featuring Jay Critch)	Christopher St. Victor; Jason Critchlow; Jacari D'Shawn Cameron	Cam Beats	3:49
4.	"Looking at Me" (featuring Rich The Kid)	Christopher St. Victor; Adam Hassan Kolankiewicz	NOCAP3	3:27
5.	"If I Tell You"	Christopher St. Victor; Brytavious Chambers; Robert Mandell	G Koop; Tay Keith	3:34
6.	"Shawty Do You"	Christopher St. Victor; Benjamin Diehl	Ben Billions	3:13
7.	"Take a Lil' Time"	Christopher St. Victor; Andre Eric Proctor; Chris Kim; Sebastian Lopez	Dre Moon	2:59
8.	"Not Too Many"	Christopher St. Victor; Brytavious Chambers	Tay Keith	2:56
9.	"Westside"	Christopher St. Victor; Stefan Vellema	Filthy Plux	3:44
10.	"Hills"	Christopher St. Victor; Cooper McGill; Maxime Ramananjanahary	PALE 1080	2:37
11.	"Perry"	Christopher St. Victor; Tyrese D. Pierre	Chronic Cloud	2:47
12.	"Leave Me Alone"	Christopher St. Victor; Mathias Rosenholm; Per Landas	Cast Beats; YOUNG FOREVER	3:15
13.	"Till I'm Gone" (featuring Kodak Black)	Christopher St. Victor; Bill K. Kapri; Adam Feeney; Benjamin Deihl; Khaled Khaled	Ben Billions; DJ Khaled; Frank Dukes	3:46

== Charts ==
Chart (2019)	Peak position
US Billboard 200	132

== See also ==
- 2019 in hip hop music
