= List of number-one R&B/hip-hop songs of 2019 (U.S.) =

This page lists the songs that reached number-one on the overall Hot R&B/Hip-Hop Songs chart, the R&B Songs chart (which was created in 2012), and the Hot Rap Songs chart in 2019. The R&B Songs and Rap Songs charts partly serve as distillations of the overall R&B/Hip-Hop Songs chart.

== List of number ones ==
Issue date	R&B/Hip-Hop Songs	Artist	R&B Songs	Artist	Rap Songs	Artist	R&B/Hip-Hop Airplay	Artist	Refs.
January 5	"Sicko Mode"	Travis Scott	"Trip"	Ella Mai	"Sicko Mode"	Travis Scott	"Trip"	Ella Mai	
January 12	"Sunflower"	Post Malone and Swae Lee	"Trip"	Ella Mai	"Sunflower"	Post Malone and Swae Lee	"Trip"	Ella Mai	
January 19	"Sunflower"	Post Malone and Swae Lee	"Better"	Khalid	"Sunflower"	Post Malone and Swae Lee	"Trip"	Ella Mai	
January 26	"Sunflower"	Post Malone and Swae Lee	"Better"	Khalid	"Sunflower"	Post Malone and Swae Lee	"Trip"	Ella Mai	
February 2	"Sunflower"	Post Malone and Swae Lee	"Better"	Khalid	"Sunflower"	Post Malone and Swae Lee	"Money"	Cardi B	
February 9	"Sunflower"	Post Malone and Swae Lee	"Better"	Khalid	"Sunflower"	Post Malone and Swae Lee	"Money"	Cardi B	
February 16	"Sunflower"	Post Malone and Swae Lee	"Better"	Khalid	"Sunflower"	Post Malone and Swae Lee	"Money"	Cardi B	
February 23	"Sunflower"	Post Malone and Swae Lee	"Better"	Khalid	"Sunflower"	Post Malone and Swae Lee	"Money"	Cardi B	
March 2	"Sunflower"	Post Malone and Swae Lee	"Better"	Khalid	"Sunflower"	Post Malone and Swae Lee	"Money"	Cardi B	
March 9	"Sunflower"	Post Malone and Swae Lee	"Better"	Khalid	"Sunflower"	Post Malone and Swae Lee	"Money"	Cardi B	
March 16	"Please Me"	Cardi B and Bruno Mars	"Better"	Khalid	"Please Me"	Cardi B and Bruno Mars	"Money"	Cardi B	
March 23	"Sunflower"	Post Malone and Swae Lee	"Better"	Khalid	"Sunflower"	Post Malone and Swae Lee	"Money"	Cardi B	
March 30	"Sunflower"	Post Malone and Swae Lee	"Better"	Khalid	"Sunflower"	Post Malone and Swae Lee	"Money"	Cardi B	
April 6	"Wow"	Post Malone	"Better"	Khalid	"Wow"	Post Malone	"Please Me"	Cardi B and Bruno Mars	
April 13	"Old Town Road"	Lil Nas X featuring Billy Ray Cyrus	"Better"	Khalid	"Old Town Road"	Lil Nas X featuring Billy Ray Cyrus	"Please Me"	Cardi B and Bruno Mars	
April 20	"Old Town Road"	Lil Nas X featuring Billy Ray Cyrus	"Better"	Khalid	"Old Town Road"	Lil Nas X featuring Billy Ray Cyrus	"Please Me"	Cardi B and Bruno Mars	
April 27	"Old Town Road"	Lil Nas X featuring Billy Ray Cyrus	"Better"	Khalid	"Old Town Road"	Lil Nas X featuring Billy Ray Cyrus	"Please Me"	Cardi B and Bruno Mars	
May 4	"Old Town Road"	Lil Nas X featuring Billy Ray Cyrus	"Talk"	Khalid	"Old Town Road"	Lil Nas X featuring Billy Ray Cyrus	"Please Me"	Cardi B and Bruno Mars	
May 11	"Old Town Road"	Lil Nas X featuring Billy Ray Cyrus	"Talk"	Khalid	"Old Town Road"	Lil Nas X featuring Billy Ray Cyrus	"Please Me"	Cardi B and Bruno Mars	
May 18	"Old Town Road"	Lil Nas X featuring Billy Ray Cyrus	"Talk"	Khalid	"Old Town Road"	Lil Nas X featuring Billy Ray Cyrus	"Please Me"	Cardi B and Bruno Mars	
May 25	"Old Town Road"	Lil Nas X featuring Billy Ray Cyrus	"Talk"	Khalid	"Old Town Road"	Lil Nas X featuring Billy Ray Cyrus	"Please Me"	Cardi B and Bruno Mars	
June 1	"Old Town Road"	Lil Nas X featuring Billy Ray Cyrus	"Talk"	Khalid	"Old Town Road"	Lil Nas X featuring Billy Ray Cyrus	"Please Me"	Cardi B and Bruno Mars	
June 8	"Old Town Road"	Lil Nas X featuring Billy Ray Cyrus	"Talk"	Khalid	"Old Town Road"	Lil Nas X featuring Billy Ray Cyrus	"Please Me"	Cardi B and Bruno Mars	
June 15	"Old Town Road"	Lil Nas X featuring Billy Ray Cyrus	"Talk"	Khalid	"Old Town Road"	Lil Nas X featuring Billy Ray Cyrus	"Please Me"	Cardi B and Bruno Mars	
June 22	"Old Town Road"	Lil Nas X featuring Billy Ray Cyrus	"Talk"	Khalid	"Old Town Road"	Lil Nas X featuring Billy Ray Cyrus	"Suge"	DaBaby	
June 29	"Old Town Road"	Lil Nas X featuring Billy Ray Cyrus	"Talk"	Khalid	"Old Town Road"	Lil Nas X featuring Billy Ray Cyrus	"Suge"	DaBaby	
July 6	"Old Town Road"	Lil Nas X featuring Billy Ray Cyrus	"Talk"	Khalid	"Old Town Road"	Lil Nas X featuring Billy Ray Cyrus	"Suge"	DaBaby	
July 13	"Old Town Road"	Lil Nas X featuring Billy Ray Cyrus	"Talk"	Khalid	"Old Town Road"	Lil Nas X featuring Billy Ray Cyrus	"Suge"	DaBaby	
July 20	"Old Town Road"	Lil Nas X featuring Billy Ray Cyrus	"Talk"	Khalid	"Old Town Road"	Lil Nas X featuring Billy Ray Cyrus	"Talk"	Khalid	
July 27	"Old Town Road"	Lil Nas X featuring Billy Ray Cyrus	"Talk"	Khalid	"Old Town Road"	Lil Nas X featuring Billy Ray Cyrus	"Talk"	Khalid	
August 3	"Old Town Road"	Lil Nas X featuring Billy Ray Cyrus	"Talk"	Khalid	"Old Town Road"	Lil Nas X featuring Billy Ray Cyrus	"Talk"	Khalid	
August 10	"Old Town Road"	Lil Nas X featuring Billy Ray Cyrus	"Talk"	Khalid	"Old Town Road"	Lil Nas X featuring Billy Ray Cyrus	"Talk"	Khalid	
August 17	"Old Town Road"	Lil Nas X featuring Billy Ray Cyrus	"Talk"	Khalid	"Old Town Road"	Lil Nas X featuring Billy Ray Cyrus	"Talk"	Khalid	
August 24	"Old Town Road"	Lil Nas X featuring Billy Ray Cyrus	"Talk"	Khalid	"Old Town Road"	Lil Nas X featuring Billy Ray Cyrus	"No Guidance"	Chris Brown featuring Drake	
August 31	"Truth Hurts"	Lizzo	"Talk"	Khalid	"Truth Hurts"	Lizzo	"No Guidance"	Chris Brown featuring Drake	
September 7	"Truth Hurts"	Lizzo	"No Guidance"	Chris Brown featuring Drake	"Truth Hurts"	Lizzo	"No Guidance"	Chris Brown featuring Drake	
September 14	"Truth Hurts"	Lizzo	"No Guidance"	Chris Brown featuring Drake	"Truth Hurts"	Lizzo	"No Guidance"	Chris Brown featuring Drake	
September 21	"Truth Hurts"	Lizzo	"No Guidance"	Chris Brown featuring Drake	"Truth Hurts"	Lizzo	"No Guidance"	Chris Brown featuring Drake	
September 28	"Truth Hurts"	Lizzo	"No Guidance"	Chris Brown featuring Drake	"Truth Hurts"	Lizzo	"No Guidance"	Chris Brown featuring Drake	
October 5	"Truth Hurts"	Lizzo	"No Guidance"	Chris Brown featuring Drake	"Truth Hurts"	Lizzo	"No Guidance"	Chris Brown featuring Drake	
October 12	"Truth Hurts"	Lizzo	"No Guidance"	Chris Brown featuring Drake	"Truth Hurts"	Lizzo	"No Guidance"	Chris Brown featuring Drake	
October 19	"Highest in the Room"	Travis Scott	"No Guidance"	Chris Brown featuring Drake	"Highest in the Room"	Travis Scott	"No Guidance"	Chris Brown featuring Drake	
October 26	"Truth Hurts"	Lizzo	"No Guidance"	Chris Brown featuring Drake	"Truth Hurts"	Lizzo	"No Guidance"	Chris Brown featuring Drake	
November 2	"Truth Hurts"	Lizzo	"No Guidance"	Chris Brown featuring Drake	"Truth Hurts"	Lizzo	"No Guidance"	Chris Brown featuring Drake	
November 9	"Truth Hurts"	Lizzo	"Good as Hell"	Lizzo	"Truth Hurts"	Lizzo	"No Guidance"	Chris Brown featuring Drake	
November 16	"Truth Hurts"	Lizzo	"Good as Hell"	Lizzo	"Truth Hurts"	Lizzo	"No Guidance"	Chris Brown featuring Drake	
November 23	"Good as Hell"	Lizzo	"Good as Hell"	Lizzo	"Truth Hurts"	Lizzo	"No Guidance"	Chris Brown featuring Drake	
November 30	"Good as Hell"	Lizzo	"Good as Hell"	Lizzo	"Truth Hurts"	Lizzo	"No Guidance"	Chris Brown featuring Drake	
December 7	"Good as Hell"	Lizzo	"Good as Hell"	Lizzo	"Roxanne"	Arizona Zervas	"No Guidance"	Chris Brown featuring Drake	
December 14	"Heartless"	The Weeknd	"Heartless"	The Weeknd	"Roxanne"	Arizona Zervas	"No Guidance"	Chris Brown featuring Drake	
December 21	"Good as Hell"	Lizzo	"Good as Hell"	Lizzo	"Roxanne"	Arizona Zervas	"No Guidance"	Chris Brown featuring Drake	
December 28	"Roxanne"	Arizona Zervas	"Good as Hell"	Lizzo	"Roxanne"	Arizona Zervas	"No Guidance"	Chris Brown featuring Drake	

== See also ==
- Billboard Year-End Hot R&B/Hip-Hop Songs of 2019
- List of Billboard Hot 100 number-one singles of 2019
- List of Billboard number-one R&B/hip-hop albums of 2019
