= Red Room (song) =

Single by Offset

from the album Father of 4
- Released: February 14, 2019
- Recorded: 2018
- Genre: Trap
- Length: 4:01
- Label: Quality Control; Motown; Capitol
- Songwriters: Kiari Kendrell Cephus; Leland Wayne
- Producer: Metro Boomin

Offset singles chronology
"Hurts Like Hell" (2018)	"Red Room" (2019)	"Clout" (2019)

Music video
- "Red Room" on YouTube

"Red Room" is the debut solo single by American rapper Offset, from his debut studio album Father of 4. Produced by Metro Boomin, the song was officially released alongside its music video on February 14, 2019, but was previously made available for a short time on November 30, 2018, before later being taken down.

== Background ==
After both other members of Migos, Quavo and Takeoff released their solo studio albums, Offset's was expected to be released on December 14, 2018. "Red Room" was to precede the album, and was made available on November 30, 2018, before being taken down without explanation other than Offset saying the album would be "out soon".

== Critical reception ==
The song was called "introspective" and a "look into" Offset's life on which he raps about "growing up with no father, his brother's arrest, and his brush with death" by XXL.

== Music video ==
The music video was released along with the song on February 14, 2019. It is directed by Aisultan Seitov. The video makes use of a fish-eye lens and features a car accident, which was considered a "reinterpretation" of Offset's real car accident from 2018.

== Charts ==
Chart (2019)	Peak position
Canada Hot 100 (Billboard)	42
Ireland (IRMA)	89
Lithuania (AGATA)	94
New Zealand Hot Singles (RMNZ)	12
UK Singles (Official Charts)	98
US Billboard Hot 100	49
US Hot R&B/Hip-Hop Songs (Billboard)	22

== Certifications ==
Region	Certification	Certified units/sales
Brazil (Pro-Música Brasil)	Gold	20,000^{‡}
United States (RIAA)	Platinum	1,000,000^{‡}
^{‡} Sales+streaming figures based on certification alone.
