= Hear Me Calling =

2019 song by Juice WRLD

Single by Juice Wrld

from the album Death Race for Love
- Released: March 1, 2019
- Recorded: Intro, Chorus & First Verse January 12, 2019; Outro & Second Verse January 23, 2019
- Genre: Emo rap; pop; afrobeats
- Length: 3:09
- Label: Grade A; Interscope
- Songwriters: Jarad Higgins; George Dickinson; Nathanial Caserta
- Producer: Purps

Juice Wrld singles chronology
"Robbery" (2019)	"Hear Me Calling" (2019)	"All Night" (2019)

Music video
- Video on YouTube

"Hear Me Calling" is a song by American rapper Juice Wrld. Produced by Purps of 808 Mafia, it was released as the second single from his second studio album Death Race for Love on March 1, 2019. It was sent to Italy contemporary hit radio on March 22, 2019, through Universal and later sent to US rhythmic contemporary radio on April 9, 2019 The song was featured in the soundtrack of NBA 2K20.

== Background and composition ==
Producer Purps from 808 Mafia states that he was aiming for a more "happy pop" sound when composing the tropical-influenced beat. After Purps played the beat by accident during a recording session, Juice was impressed by the beat and freestyled the lyrics to the song in 40 minutes. In an Instagram live, Higgin's then girlfriend Ally Lotti revealed that the song was made after she almost left him as the first verse alludes to that.

== Music video ==
The video was released on March 11, 2019, and was directed by Bradley & Pablo. In a homage to PlayStation games such as Twisted Metal, Juice is shown rescuing his love interest from a speeding truck with video-game-style CGI graphics integrated with live action, complete with a simulated car chase.

== Charts ==
Chart (2019)	Peak position
Australia (ARIA)	54
Canada (Canadian Hot 100)	45
Ireland (IRMA)	46
Lithuania (AGATA)	82
New Zealand Hot Singles (RMNZ)	9
UK Singles (OCC)	58
US Billboard Hot 100	38
US Hot R&B/Hip-Hop Songs (Billboard)	16
US Hot Rap Songs (Billboard)	15
US Rhythmic (Billboard)	20

== Certifications ==
Region	Certification	Certified units/sales
New Zealand (RMNZ)	Gold	15,000^{‡}
United Kingdom (BPI)	Silver	200,000^{‡}
United States (RIAA)	2× Platinum	2,000,000^{‡}
^{‡} Sales+streaming figures based on certification alone.

== Release history ==
Region	Date	Format	Label	Ref.
Various	March 1, 2019	Digital download	Interscope; Grade A	
Italy	March 22, 2019	Contemporary hit radio	Universal	
United States	April 8, 2019	Rhythmic contemporary	Interscope; Grade A	
United States	April 9, 2019	Rhythmic contemporary	Interscope; Grade A	
United States	April 30, 2019	Contemporary hit radio	Interscope; Grade A	
