= Fast (Juice Wrld song) =

2019 song by Juice Wrld

Song by Juice Wrld

from the album Death Race for Love
- Released: March 8, 2019
- Recorded: November 2018
- Length: 3:29
- Label: Grade A; Interscope
- Songwriters: Jarad Higgins; Andrew Wotman; Adam Feeney; Carl Rosen; Louis Bell
- Producers: Andrew Watt; Louis Bell; Frank Dukes

Music video
- "Fast" on YouTube

"Fast" is a song by American rapper Juice Wrld, released on March 8, 2019, as the fifth track from his second studio album Death Race for Love. A music video for the song was released on April 9, 2019. The song was certified Platinum by the Recording Industry Association of America (RIAA) on October 29, 2021.

== Composition ==
In "Fast", Juice Wrld delves into introspective themes, contemplating the trappings of fame. The artist also reflects on his meteoric success and the effects-both negative and positive- that it has had on him, while maintaining he is "still the same dude [he] was back then".

== Music video ==
The accompanying music video for "Fast" adopts a minimalist narrative approach, prioritizing the use of striking visual effects and themes of psychedelia. The video includes intimate shots of Juice Wrld delivering his verses with imagery featuring race cars, complemented by elements of macrophilia. The vibrant palette and dynamic light trails add to the album's overarching motif of speed and racing. Directed by Alexandre Moors, the video has received over 108 million views as of September 2026.

== Credits and personnel ==
Credits adapted from Tidal.

- Jarad Higgins – vocals, songwriting, composition
- Andrew Wotman – songwriting, composition, production
- Adam Feeney – songwriting, composition, production
- Louis Bell – songwriting, composition, production
- Carl Rosen – songwriting, composition
- Manny Marroquin – mixing, studio personnel

== Charts ==
Chart (2019)	Peak position
Australia (ARIA)	62
Canada Hot 100 (Billboard)	39
Greece (IFPI)	49
Ireland (IRMA)	33
Lithuania (AGATA)	17
Netherlands (Single Top 100)	88
New Zealand Hot Singles (RMNZ)	4
Portugal (AFP)	80
Sweden (Sverigetopplistan)	71
Switzerland (Schweizer Hitparade)	85
UK Singles (Official Charts)	41
UK Hip Hop/R&B (Official Charts)	26
US Billboard Hot 100	47
US Hot R&B/Hip-Hop Songs (Billboard)	22

== Certifications ==
Region	Certification	Certified units/sales
Australia (ARIA)	Gold	35,000^{‡}
Denmark (IFPI Danmark)	Gold	45,000^{‡}
New Zealand (RMNZ)	Gold	15,000^{‡}
United Kingdom (BPI)	Silver	200,000^{‡}
United States (RIAA)	Platinum	1,000,000^{‡}
^{‡} Sales+streaming figures based on certification alone.
