= Father of 4 (album) =

Studio album by Offset
- Released: February 22, 2019
- Studio: Astro; Quality Control; Zac (Atlanta); Boominati; Republic (Los Angeles); Offset In-Home Studio (Los Angeles and Atlanta); Studio Grande Armee (Paris)
- Genre: Hip hop; trap
- Length: 57:14
- Label: Quality Control; Motown
- Producer: Allen Ritter; BLWYRMND; Cubeatz; Doughboy Beatz; Dre Moon; Metro Boomin; Pyrex; So Icey Boyz; Southside; Vou; Wavy; Zaytoven

Offset chronology
Without Warning (2017)	Father of 4 (2019)	Set It Off (2023)

Singles from Father of 4
- 1. "Red Room" Released: February 14, 2019; 2. "Clout" Released: March 15, 2019

Father of 4 is the debut studio album by American rapper Offset. It was released on February 22, 2019, by Quality Control Music and Motown. The album's release makes Offset the third and final member from Migos to release a solo album. It features guest appearances by J. Cole, Cardi B, Travis Scott, 21 Savage, Big Rube, Gunna, CeeLo Green, Quavo, and Gucci Mane. The album was supported by two singles: "Red Room" and "Clout".

Father of 4 received generally positive reviews from critics and debuted at number four on the US Billboard 200. It is Offset's second solo US top 10 album.

== Background ==
The idea of a solo album by Offset was initially revealed shortly after the release of Quavo Huncho and The Last Rocket, both by fellow Migos artists Quavo and Takeoff respectively, and was slated for a December 14, 2018 release date. The album was delayed presumably due to complications between his relationship with his wife Cardi B, on February 10, 2019, the album was given a new release date of February 22. In early 2019, Offset announced a documentary teaser to release alongside the album which shows a scene where his wife and rapper Cardi B gives birth to their daughter, Kulture. On February 18, Offset tweeted that Metro Boomin and Southside were going to be sole producers of his album.

== Promotion ==
The album's lead single, "Red Room", was released on February 14, 2019, but was previously made available for a short time on November 30, 2018, before later being taken down. The song was produced by Metro Boomin. The album's second single, "Clout" featuring his wife Cardi B, was released on March 15, 2019.

== Critical reception ==
Professional ratings
Aggregate scores
Source	Rating
Metacritic	72/100
Review scores
Source	Rating
AllMusic	3/5 stars
Consequence	B−
Entertainment Weekly	B−
Exclaim!	7/10
Highsnobiety	3.5/5
HipHopDX	4.0/5
HotNewHipHop	79%
NME	4/5 stars
Pitchfork	6.9/10
Rolling Stone	3.5/5 stars

Father of 4 was met with generally positive reviews. At Metacritic, which assigns a normalized rating out of 100 to reviews from mainstream publications, the album received an average score of 72, based on eight reviews.

Trent Clark of HipHopDX gave a positive review, stating "The 27-year-old Offset digs deep into his Atlanta Hip Hop lineage, crafting an album that's equal parts rare in this climate (seeing it follows an unfolding narrative) and refreshing, given its telling content". Sam Moore from NME stated, "Father of 4 is a fine body of work that builds a convincing case that Offset is currently best-placed to be Migos' break-out solo star: once again, the final act of a trilogy proves to be the finest". Exclaim! critic Kyle Mullin said, "Sure, some of the dark and downtempo beats can begin to sound same-y by the time you're through. And Offset certainly hasn't attained the lyrical brilliance of Jay-Z on 4:44, or any of the other elder rapper's releases for that matter. Nevertheless, Offset's level of growth and candour on Father of 4 is that of an MC making leaps and bounds, both in his music and his personal life". Charles Holmes of Rolling Stone opined, "Predictably, Father of 4 falls prey to the bloat that characterizes most Migos' projects. ... Father of 4 is decidedly still a trap album, but it bucks the current conventions of the genre. Offset is attempting, often successfully, to showcase the humanity behind his frequently misguided choices – it's a piece of art that likely wouldn't exist if we didn't already know about some of his transgressions".

Stephen Kearse of Pitchfork said, "Father of 4 ultimately works as a solo outing because Offset is such a force of nature, but it's too often cautious where it could be candid, or dull where it should be sharp. Still, the record is a progression for Offset and for Migos". Reviewing the album for Entertainment Weekly, Brian Josephs stated: "Offset often sounds drained in a way that doesn't really invite empathy." Consequence's Wren Graves wrote, "Offset splits his time between personal stories and generalized trapping, with mixed results. When he finds the right flow, few can match him for sheer musical joy. Other times he sound flat and stale. ... You have to respect the work ethic that produced these 16 tracks, even if many of them don't merit a second listen".

== Commercial performance ==
Father of 4 debuted at number four on the US Billboard 200 with 89,000 album-equivalent units, including 7,000 pure album sales in its first week. It is Offset's second solo US top 10 album. In its second week, the album dropped to number nine on the chart, earning an additional 39,000 album-equivalent units that week. As of May 2019, the album has earned 282,000 album-equivalent units including 10,000 copies in pure album sales in the United States.

== Track listing ==
Father of 4 track listing
No.	Title	Writer(s)	Producer(s)	Length
1.	"Father of 4" (featuring Big Rube)	Kiari Cephus; Leland Wayne; Ruben Bailey; Peter Lee Johnson	Metro Boomin; Johnson^{[a]}	4:19
2.	"How Did I Get Here" (featuring J. Cole)	Cephus; Jermaine Cole; Wayne; Andre Proctor	Metro Boomin; Dre Moon	4:36
3.	"Lick"	Cephus; Wayne; Proctor; Montrell Martinez	Dre Moon; Wavy	3:24
4.	"Tats on My Face"	Cephus; Wayne; Joshua Luellen	So Icey Boyz	3:02
5.	"Made Men"	Cephus; Luellen; Ugur Tig	Southside; Vou	3:34
6.	"Wild Wild West" (featuring Gunna)	Cephus; Sergio Kitchens; Wayne; Allen Ritter	Metro Boomin; Ritter^{[a]}	3:56
7.	"North Star" (featuring CeeLo Green)	Cephus; Thomas Callaway; Wayne; Ritter; Robert Mandell; Andy Taylor; John Taylor; Nick Rhodes; Roger Taylor; Simon Le Bon	Metro Boomin; Ritter; Dre Moon; G Koop^{[a]}	4:05
8.	"After Dark"	Cephus; Wayne; Ritter; Proctor; Johnson; Donald Cannon	Metro Boomin; Ritter; Dre Moon; Don Cannon^{[a]}	2:52
9.	"Don't Lose Me"	Cephus; Wayne; Bradley Brandon	Metro Boomin; Doughboy Beatz	3:20
10.	"Underrated"	Cephus; Wayne; Luellen	So Icey Boyz	2:29
11.	"Legacy" (featuring Travis Scott and 21 Savage)	Cephus; Jacques Webster II; Shayaa Abraham-Joseph; Luellen; Tig	Southside; Vou	4:04
12.	"Clout" (featuring Cardi B)	Cephus; Belcalis Almanzar; Luellen; Jordan Thorpe; Kevin Gomringer; Tim Gomringer	Southside; Cubeatz	3:25
13.	"On Fleek" (featuring Quavo)	Cephus; Quavious Marshall; Wayne; Xavier Dotson; Brandon	Metro Boomin; Zaytoven; Doughboy Beatz	3:49
14.	"Quarter Milli" (featuring Gucci Mane)	Cephus; Radric Davis; Kedrick Cannady; Wayne	Metro Boomin; Pyrex	3:14
15.	"Red Room"	Cephus; Wayne	Metro Boomin	4:01
16.	"Came a Long Way"	Cephus; Proctor; Simon Schranz; Wayne	BLWYRMND; Dre Moon; Metro Boomin	2:52
Total length:				57:14

Notes

- ^{^[a]} signifies an additional producer

Sample credits

- "North Star" contains an interpolation from "Save a Prayer", written by Simon Le Bon, Andy Taylor, John Taylor, Roger Taylor, and Nick Rhodes, as performed by Duran Duran.

== Personnel ==
Credits adapted from the album's liner notes and Tidal.

Musicians

- Peter Lee Johnson – strings (tracks 1, 8, 9)
- North Star Choir – choir (track 7)
  - Brandon Whatley, Jonathan Coleman, Deidre Etheridge, Brandelyn Harris-Crumedy, Olivia King, Yolanda Stewart, Marcus Ross, Demetrius Banks, Brandi Jackson, Tiuanna Lemons
- G Koop – guitar (track 9)

Technical

- JRich ENT. – recording (tracks 1, 2, 4, 5, 11, 12)
- Evan LaRay – recording (tracks 1, 11, 12)
- Ethan Stevens – recording (tracks 1, 8, 10, 15, 16), mixing (track 1, 7, 9, 12, 16)
- William "Bilz" Dougan – recording (track 7)
- DJ Durel – mixing (all tracks)
- Thomas "Tillie" Mann – mixing (tracks 2–6, 10–14), recording (tracks 6, 9)
- Princeton "Perfect Harmony" Terry – mixing assistant (track 11)
- Colin Leonard – mastering (all tracks)

== Charts ==
=== Weekly charts ===
Chart performance for Father of 4
Chart (2019)	Peak position
Australian Albums (ARIA)	18
Austrian Albums (Ö3 Austria)	25
Belgian Albums (Ultratop Flanders)	23
Belgian Albums (Ultratop Wallonia)	49
Canadian Albums (Billboard)	3
Danish Albums (Hitlisten)	12
Dutch Albums (Album Top 100)	13
French Albums (SNEP)	35
German Albums (Offizielle Top 100)	54
Irish Albums (IRMA)	20
Italian Albums (FIMI)	63
Latvian Albums (LAIPA)	17
Lithuanian Albums (AGATA)	9
New Zealand Albums (RMNZ)	19
Norwegian Albums (VG-lista)	15
Swedish Albums (Sverigetopplistan)	29
Swiss Albums (Schweizer Hitparade)	14
UK Albums (OCC)	19
US Billboard 200	4
US Top R&B/Hip-Hop Albums (Billboard)	2

=== Year-end charts ===
2019 year-end chart performance for Father of 4
Chart (2019)	Position
US Billboard 200	84
US Top R&B/Hip-Hop Albums (Billboard)	43

== Certifications ==
Certifications for Father of 4
Region	Certification	Certified units/sales
United States (RIAA)	Gold	500,000^{‡}
^{‡} Sales+streaming figures based on certification alone.
