= Bad Bad Bad =

2019 song by Young Thug featuring Lil Baby

Song by Young Thug featuring Lil Baby

from the album So Much Fun
- Released: August 16, 2019
- Length: 2:29
- Label: YSL; 300; Atlantic
- Songwriters: Jeffery Williams; Dominique Jones; Wesley Glass; Nils Noëhden
- Producers: Wheezy; Nils

"Bad Bad Bad" is a song by American rapper Young Thug, released on August 16, 2019, from his debut studio album So Much Fun. Featuring American rapper Lil Baby, it was produced by Wheezy and Nils. The song centers on the rappers' luxurious lifestyles.

== Critical reception ==
The song received generally positive reviews from critics. Lucy Shanker of Consequence commented, "Lil Baby sounded so good on 'Bad Bad Bad' that Thug named the next song after him like he did in the JEFFREY days." Alphonse Pierre of Pitchfork stated, "His most accomplished pupil, Lil Baby, makes him proud on “Bad Bad Bad,” as his unrelatable boasts about real estate and foreign whips are on par with Thug." Jeff Heinzl of Spectrum Culture commented "we can take great pleasure in Thugger's vocal acrobatics", mentioning as an example Young Thug's ability to "squeeze a colony of words into a tiny bit of space" as shown in the song. Scott Glaysher of HipHopDX wrote that "those with a deep desire for overtly audible hit records need look no further than 'Bad Bad Bad' with Lil Baby".

== Charts ==
Chart (2019)	Peak position
Canada Hot 100 (Billboard)	47
New Zealand Hot Singles (RMNZ)	6
UK Singles (OCC)	72
US Billboard Hot 100	32
US Hot R&B/Hip-Hop Songs (Billboard)	15

== Certifications ==
Region	Certification	Certified units/sales
Canada (Music Canada)	Gold	40,000^{‡}
United States (RIAA)	Platinum	1,000,000^{‡}
^{‡} Sales+streaming figures based on certification alone.
