= So Much Fun =

- Standard cover art for the album, deluxe edition features a red landscape.

Studio album by Young Thug
- Released: August 16, 2019
- Studios: Crosby; Electric Lady; Paramount; Record Plant; Tree Sound
- Genres: Hip-hop; trap
- Length: 62:04
- Labels: YSL; 300; Atlantic
- Producers: 12Hunna; ATL Jacob; BLSSD; Chef; Cubeatz; DJ Durel; DY; Felix Leone; Gunboi; Jayrich Laplaya; Makalo; Money Musik; Mustard; Nick Mira; Nils; Pi'erre Bourne; PittThaKid; Prezzley P; Pvlace; Pyrex; Southside; Supah Mario; T-Minus; Wheezy

Young Thug chronology
On the Rvn (2018)	So Much Fun (2019)	Slime & B (2020)

Singles from So Much Fun
- 1. "The London" Released: May 23, 2019; 2. "Hot" Released: October 31, 2019

So Much Fun is the debut studio album by American rapper Young Thug. It was released on August 16, 2019, by YSL Records, 300 Entertainment and Atlantic Records. The album features guest appearances from Future, Machine Gun Kelly, Gunna, Lil Baby, Lil Uzi Vert, Lil Duke, 21 Savage, Doe Boy, Lil Keed, Quavo, Juice Wrld, Nav, J. Cole, and Travis Scott. The album was supported by the singles "The London" and "Hot".

So Much Fun received generally positive reviews and debuted atop the US Billboard 200, becoming Young Thug's first US number-one album.

== Production ==
American musician J. Cole was originally rumored, without any official confirmation from Cole nor Thug, to serve as the executive producer on the album, but his contributions did not make it to the final album. Among others, for the album Thug worked with Roddy Ricch, 21 Savage, and Gunna in recording sessions for the album.

== Release and promotion ==
So Much Fun was originally titled GOLDMOUFDOG (stylized as GØŁDMØÜFDÖG) before Young Thug revealed the new title in an interview with podcast host Adam22 for his No Jumper channel. Thug also announced the album's title had been changed on social media. On August 10, 2019, Thug announced the album would be released on August 16. The deluxe edition of the album was released on December 20, 2019, featuring five new tracks: "Diamonds", "Hop Off a Jet", "Die Today", "Millions", and the remix of "Hot".

=== Singles ===
The album's lead single, "The London" featuring J. Cole and Travis Scott, was released on May 23, 2019. The song was produced by T-Minus. It peaked at number 12 on the US Billboard Hot 100. The second single, "Hot" featuring Gunna, was released in a remix additionally featuring Travis Scott on October 31, 2019. It peaked at number 11 on the Billboard Hot 100.

== Artwork ==
The album's artwork features 803 images of Young Thug posed in order to form Young Thug's face.

== Critical reception ==
Professional ratings
Aggregate scores
Source	Rating
AnyDecentMusic?	7.3/10
Metacritic	79/100
Review scores
Source	Rating
AllMusic	4/5 stars
And It Don't Stop	B+
Consequence	B
HipHopDX	4.0/5
NME	4/5 stars
Pitchfork	8.4/10
PopMatters	7/10
RapReviews	6/10
Rolling Stone	3.5/5 stars
Spectrum Culture	4/5 stars

So Much Fun was met with generally positive reviews. At Metacritic, which assigns a normalized rating out of 100 to reviews from professional publications, the album received an average score of 79, based on 10 reviews. Aggregator AnyDecentMusic? gave it 7.3 out of 10, based on their assessment of the critical consensus.

Alphonse Pierre of Pitchfork gave a positive review, stating "Despite all the collaborations on So Much Fun, the album is about Young Thug. He might not mystify as he did in the early stages of his career, when he was stumbling into new flows and deliveries at an inhuman pace, but now he's able to wield the madness with ease, satisfying in many modes". Scott Glaysher of HipHopDX wrote that "Thugger has performed vocally like this before on Jeffrey, lyrically like this on Slime Season and emotionally like this on Beautiful Thugger Girls but not consistently have they all converged together like this, forging the ultimate Young Thug Voltron. Plus, this top-notch performance has been spread across such perfectly paced beats. Quite literally, the production on this album is just a blast". Jacob Carey of Exclaim! said, "Although it may not be the best project that Young Thug has released, certain tracks off So Much Fun are guaranteed to become classic party anthems played at max volume for years". Kyann-Sian Williams of NME stated, "So Much Fun is a free-spirited record that comes with heavy doses of ridiculousness, but it's lovably silly, and is a welcome dose of light relief". Lucy Shanker of Consequence claimed, "So Much Fun succeeds in its quest to highlight the success of Young Thug; almost all of the 19 tracks could stand alone as a strong demonstration of what Thug does best, but they also work together to create a cohesive project". Magazine publication Spin said, "Some classic records have been made in this mold; plenty of dull ones, too. So Much Fun is somewhere in the middle, with a handful of legitimately great songs, only a couple you may end up skipping, and none that sound like someone forgot to send them to the mastering engineer".

Rolling Stone's critic Danny Schwartz said, "So Much Fun doesn't mark a step forward for his aesthetic, but rather an attempt to refine it". In a mixed review, RapReviews's Steve "Flash" Juon stated: "You can't examine Young Thug's music too closely or think about it too carefully if you want to enjoy it, because the casual misogyny of throwing around "Pussy" as an insult reminds you he's not exactly progressive. If you're looking for bass to shake the concrete and singing so modulated as to nearly be R&B, tracks like "Jumped Out the Window" and "Boy Back" featuring NAV will definitely fit the bill." In his "Consumer Guide" column, Robert Christgau said that, "In alphabetical order, it's alienated, all-embracing, catchy, complacent, crass, dirty, dissolute, facile, fucked up, funny, hedonistic, insular, licentious, light-hearted, materialistic, mumbly, rich, scared, sexist, 'trap', unpretentious, woozy, and wrong. Almost a decade in, I do enjoy and even respect the fella. But I don't admire him. Not enough there there".

=== Year-end lists ===
Select year-end rankings of So Much Fun
Publication	List	Rank	Ref.
Billboard	50 Best Albums of 2019	43	
Complex	Best Albums of 2019	4	
Noisey	The 100 Best Albums of 2019	71	
Rolling Stone	50 Best Albums of 2019	18	
Rolling Stone	20 Best Hip-Hop Albums of 2019	2	
Stereogum	Best Albums of 2019	25	
Stereogum	The 10 Best Rap Albums of 2019	6	
Uproxx	The Best Albums of 2019	3	
Uproxx	The Best Hip-Hop Albums of 2019	1	

=== Industry awards ===
Awards and nominations for So Much Fun
Year	Award	Category	Result	Ref.
2020	Billboard Music Awards	Top Rap Album	Nominated	

== Commercial performance ==
So Much Fun debuted at number one on the US Billboard 200 with 131,000 album-equivalent units (including 5,000 pure album sales). It is Young Thug's first US number-one album, and fifth to place in the top 10 (or sixth, if the 2018 compilation Slime Language is counted). On June 29, 2020, the album was certified platinum by the Recording Industry Association of America (RIAA) for combined sales and album-equivalent units of over one million units in the United States.

== Track listing ==
So Much Fun track listing
No.	Title	Writer(s)	Producer(s)	Length
1.	"Just How It Is"	Jeffery Williams; Wesley Glass; Nicholas Mira	Wheezy; Nick Mira	3:27
2.	"Sup Mate" (featuring Future)	J. Williams; Nayvadius Wilburn; Dwan Avery; Jacob Canady	DY; ATL Jacob	3:58
3.	"Ecstasy" (featuring Machine Gun Kelly)	J. Williams; Colson Baker; Avery; Michael O'Brien	DY; 12Hunna	2:58
4.	"Hot" (featuring Gunna)	J. Williams; Sergio Kitchens; Glass	Wheezy	3:13
5.	"Light It Up"	J. Williams; Jordan Jenks	Pi'erre Bourne	3:29
6.	"Surf" (featuring Gunna)	J. Williams; Kitchens; Jenks	Pi'erre Bourne	3:04
7.	"Bad Bad Bad" (featuring Lil Baby)	J. Williams; Dominique Jones; Glass; Nils Noëhden	Wheezy; Nils	2:29
8.	"Lil Baby"	J. Williams; Jenks	Pi'erre Bourne	3:22
9.	"What's the Move" (featuring Lil Uzi Vert)	J. Williams; Symere Woods; Tariq Sharrieff; Nicholas Emory	BLSSD; Chef	4:11
10.	"I Bought Her" (featuring Lil Duke)	J. Williams; Arnold Martinez; Daryl McPherson; Glass	DJ Durel; Wheezy^{[a]}	3:22
11.	"Jumped Out the Window"	J. Williams; Jonathan Priester	Supah Mario	3:24
12.	"I'm Scared" (featuring 21 Savage and Doe Boy)	J. Williams; Shéyaa Abraham-Joseph; Isam Mostafa; Jenks	Pi'erre Bourne	3:21
13.	"Cartier Gucci Scarf" (featuring Lil Duke)	J. Williams; Martinez; Richard DeBerry; Jonoah Pressley	Jayrich Laplaya; Prezzley P	3:18
14.	"Big Tipper" (featuring Lil Keed)	J. Williams; Raqhid Render; Joshua Luellen; Denis Berger; Tchakalla Romeo	Southside; Pvlace; Gunboi	3:43
15.	"Pussy"	J. Williams; Luellen; Kedrick Cannady	Southside; Pyrex	2:21
16.	"Circle of Bosses" (featuring Quavo)	J. Williams; Quavious Marshall; Glass; Noehden	Wheezy; Nils	2:59
17.	"Mannequin Challenge" (featuring Juice Wrld)	J. Williams; Jarad Higgins; Tyler Williams	T-Minus	2:42
18.	"Boy Back" (featuring Nav)	J. Williams; Navraj Goraya; Dijon McFarlane; Donald Paton; Martin Pitt	Mustard; Felix Leone; PittThaKid	3:23
19.	"The London" (featuring J. Cole and Travis Scott)	J. Williams; Jermaine Cole; Jacques Webster II; T. Williams; Kenneth Edmonds	T-Minus	3:20
Total length:				62:04

Deluxe edition (bonus tracks)
No.	Title	Writer(s)	Producer(s)	Length
1.	"Diamonds" (featuring Gunna)	J. Williams; Kitchens; Jenks	Pi'erre Bourne	3:30
2.	"Hop Off a Jet" (featuring Travis Scott)	J. Williams; Webster; Glass; Kevin Gomringer; Tim Gomringer	Wheezy; Cubeatz	2:54
3.	"Die Today"	J. Williams; Glass; Mohkom Bhangal	Wheezy; Money Musik	3:00
4.	"Millions"	J. Williams; Glass; Makalo	Wheezy; Makalo	2:37
5.	"Hot" (Remix) (featuring Gunna and Travis Scott)	J. Williams; Kitchens; Webster; Glass	Wheezy	4:39
Total length:				78:48

Notes

- ^{^[a]} signifies an additional producer
- Machine Gun Kelly's vocals were added to the track "Ecstasy" as part of a reissue on August 22, 2019.

== Personnel ==
Credits adapted from Geoff Ogunlesi's Instagram.

- A. Bainz – recording (tracks 1–7, 10, 12–18), mixing (tracks 1–18)
- Florian "Flo" Ongonga – recording (tracks 2, 8, 11, 12, 17)
- Fxxxy – recording (track 2)
- Jenso "JP" Plymouth – recording (track 3)
- Shaan Singh – recording (tracks 9, 13, 16), engineering assistant (track 10), mixing (tracks 1–18), engineering (track 19)
- Andrew "Pro Logic" Franklin – recording (track 18)
- Gosha Usov – recording (track 19)
- Alex Tumay – mixing (tracks 1–19)
- Jimmy Cash – additional mixing (track 19)
- Joe LaPorta – mastering (tracks 1–19)

== Charts ==
=== Weekly charts ===
2019 chart performance for So Much Fun
Chart (2019)	Peak position
Australian Albums (ARIA)	36
Austrian Albums (Ö3 Austria)	38
Belgian Albums (Ultratop Flanders)	20
Belgian Albums (Ultratop Wallonia)	38
Canadian Albums (Billboard)	1
Danish Albums (Hitlisten)	11
Dutch Albums (Album Top 100)	9
Finnish Albums (Suomen virallinen lista)	45
French Albums (SNEP)	29
German Albums (Offizielle Top 100)	66
Irish Albums (IRMA)	23
Italian Albums (FIMI)	48
Latvian Albums (LAIPA)	11
Lithuanian Albums (AGATA)	7
New Zealand Albums (RMNZ)	3
Norwegian Albums (VG-lista)	10
Swedish Albums (Sverigetopplistan)	38
Swiss Albums (Schweizer Hitparade)	15
UK Albums (Official Charts)	9
US Billboard 200	1
US Top R&B/Hip-Hop Albums (Billboard)	1

2025 chart performance for So Much Fun
Chart (2025)	Peak position
Portuguese Albums (AFP)	191

=== Year-end charts ===
2019 year-end chart performance for So Much Fun
Chart (2019)	Position
US Billboard 200	48
US Top R&B/Hip-Hop Albums (Billboard)	23

2020 year-end chart performance for So Much Fun
Chart (2020)	Position
US Billboard 200	38
US Top R&B/Hip-Hop Albums (Billboard)	24

2021 year-end chart performance for So Much Fun
Chart (2021)	Position
US Billboard 200	194

== Certifications ==
Certifications and sales for So Much Fun
Region	Certification	Certified units/sales
Canada (Music Canada)	Gold	40,000^{‡}
Denmark (IFPI Danmark)	Gold	10,000^{‡}
France (SNEP)	Gold	50,000^{‡}
United Kingdom (BPI)	Gold	100,000^{‡}
United States (RIAA)	Platinum	1,000,000^{‡}
^{‡} Sales+streaming figures based on certification alone.

== Release history ==
Release dates and formats for So Much Fun
Region	Date	Label(s)	Format(s)	Edition	Ref.
Various	August 16, 2019	YSL; 300; Atlantic	Digital download; streaming	Standard	
Various	December 20, 2019	YSL; 300; Atlantic	Digital download; streaming	Deluxe	
Various	May 2021	YSL; 300; Atlantic	Vinyl	Standard	
