= Press (Cardi B song) =

2019 single by Cardi B

Single by Cardi B
- Released: May 31, 2019
- Genre: Hip hop
- Length: 2:23
- Label: Atlantic
- Songwriters: Belcalis Almanzar; Derrick Milano; Jordan Thorpe; Dwane Weir; Klenord Raphael; Lewdini; Slade Da Monsta
- Producers: Slade Da Monsta; Key Wane

Cardi B singles chronology
"Clout" (2019)	"Press" (2019)	"South of the Border" (2019)

Alternative cover
- Middle East and North Africa release cover

Music video
- "Press" on YouTube

"Press" is a song by American rapper Cardi B. It was released on May 31, 2019, through Atlantic. The song was included on a digital reissue of her second studio album Am I the Drama? (2025). The single was produced by Slade Da Monsta and Key Wane. It debuted and peaked at number 16 on the US Billboard Hot 100. The song has been certified double platinum by the Recording Industry Association of America (RIAA). The parental advisory-labeled music video, starring Cardi B as a naked rampage killer facing a trial, marked her directorial debut.

== Promotion ==
In December 2018, Cardi B posted a video to Instagram of her rapping part of the song. She later said that she was set to release it soon before teasing it, but decided to release "Money" instead. On May 27, 2019, Cardi B tweeted that the "single and official cover art drops this Friday 5/31", that featured the image of Aileen Wuornos in Aileen Wuornos: The Selling of a Serial Killer. She shared the cover art of the single, which features her escorted out of a court room entirely naked by a group of men with paparazzi taking pictures of her.

== Critical reception ==
"Press" received generally positive reviews from critics, with many noting the evolution of the rapper's attitude towards the media in the lyrics from previous songs such as "Bartier Cardi" and her featured verse on husband Offset's single "Clout"; NME called the song "defiant", while Billboard labelled her as "pressing on" amid "bad press, haters, beefs". Pitchfork praised Cardi being "now fully ready to take aim at any haters" while noting the deviation between "non-stop cut-downs" and "goofier boasts about her money and sexual prowess"; the magazine also stated that the rapper had "sharpened her rapping abilities to deadly effect" in the song.

== Music video ==
The video generated controversy; in it, Cardi and other dancers are either partially or fully nude. The scene pictured shows the crew assassinated lying on the floor.

Cardi B announced that the video for "Press" would be released in June 2019 on her Twitter. The video was then officially released on June 26, 2019, on her YouTube account. It was directed by Jora Frantzis and co-directed by Cardi. The parental advisory-marked music video has since received over 100 million views.

The video opens with Cardi B's character shooting a male and a female after having a threesome. Accused of murder, she then is arrested and taken to an interrogation, where she challenges the officers. She is seen leading a choreographed routine with a crew of nude dancers. She killed a courtroom jury and the dancers. The clip closes with her angrily drowning her cellmate in the toilet.

== Live performances ==
The first televised performance of "Press" was when Cardi B performed live at the 2019 BET Awards, along with a performance of "Clout" featuring her husband Offset. Entertainment Weekly named it "the top moment" of the night in their review article. BET ranked the emerald attire as the best performance outfit since their first show in 2001. Introduced by Drake, Cardi B opened her set at the 2019 OVO Fest performing "Press".

== Charts ==
=== Weekly charts ===
Chart (2019)	Peak position
Australia (ARIA)	65
Canada Hot 100 (Billboard)	37
China Airplay/FL (Billboard)	21
France (SNEP)	158
Greece (IFPI)	15
Hungary (Single Top 40)	6
Ireland (IRMA)	38
Lithuania (AGATA)	34
New Zealand Hot Singles (RMNZ)	6
Portugal (AFP)	91
Scottish Singles Sales (Official Charts)	74
Sweden Heatseeker (Sverigetopplistan)	12
Switzerland (Schweizer Hitparade)	97
UK Singles (Official Charts)	44
UK Hip Hop/R&B (Official Charts)	18
US Billboard Hot 100	16
US Hot R&B/Hip-Hop Songs (Billboard)	6
US R&B/Hip-Hop Airplay (Billboard)	7
US Rhythmic Airplay (Billboard)	18
US Rolling Stone Top 100	47

=== Year-end charts ===
Chart (2019)	Position
US Hot R&B/Hip-Hop Songs (Billboard)	55

== Certifications ==
Region	Certification	Certified units/sales
Australia (ARIA)	Platinum	70,000^{‡}
Canada (Music Canada)	Platinum	80,000^{‡}
United States (RIAA)	2× Platinum	2,000,000^{‡}
^{‡} Sales+streaming figures based on certification alone.

== Release history ==
Region	Date	Format	Label
Various	May 31, 2019	Streaming; digital download	Atlantic
