= Hot (Young Thug song) =

2019 single by Young Thug featuring Gunna

- Remix cover

Single by Young Thug featuring Gunna

from the album So Much Fun
- Released: October 31, 2019
- Genre: Trap
- Length: 3:13
- Label: 300; Atlantic
- Songwriters: Jeffery Williams; Sergio Kitchens; Wesley Glass
- Producer: Wheezy

Young Thug singles chronology
"Move" (2019)	"Hot" (2019)	"Yell Oh" (2020)

Gunna singles chronology
"Start wit Me" (2019)	"Hot" (2019)	"Cash Cow" (2019)

Music video
- "Hot" on YouTube

"Hot" is a song by American rapper Young Thug featuring labelmate and fellow American rapper Gunna. It was produced by Wheezy and sent to rhythmic and Urban radio on September 23, 2019. It originally charted in several countries as an album track upon the release of So Much Fun in August 2019, before being released in a remix with an additional feature from fellow American rapper Travis Scott, a frequent collaborator of both, on October 31, 2019, and reaching a new peak of number 11 on the US Billboard Hot 100.

== Music video ==
The music video for the remix was released through Young Thug's official YouTube channel one day later, on November 1, 2019. In the video, Young Thug appears as a fireman, and Gunna is shown rapping in a burning house.

=== Synopsis ===
The video opens with a marching band led by Wheezy, the song's producer, on a gridiron football field. The video then transitions to Gunna writing in cursive as the house he is in continues to burn down, Young Thug then receives a call to help Gunna as he is on fire inside the house. Young Thug puts on his fireman gear and drives a Slime F.D. truck to the scene, and finds Gunna "calmly writing a note like nothing is happening around him". As soon as Thug approaches Gunna, the house explodes from the blaze. The scene then cuts to Travis Scott on a gridiron field, where the fire has now reached. Scott is surrounded by a marching band playing the song's instrumental. The blaze eventually hits each of the marching band members, who are lined up to spell out "Hot" like the track's cover art.

== Personnel ==
- Young Thug – lead vocals, writing
- Gunna – featured vocals, writing
- Wheezy – production

== Charts ==
=== Weekly charts ===
Weekly chart performance for "Hot"
Chart (2019)	Peak position
Australia (ARIA)	49
Austria (Ö3 Austria Top 40)	66
Belgium (Ultratip Bubbling Under Flanders)	20
Canada Hot 100 (Billboard)	18
France (SNEP)	119
Ireland (IRMA)	44
Lithuania (AGATA)	43
New Zealand (Recorded Music NZ)	40
Portugal (AFP)	45
Sweden (Sverigetopplistan)	93
Switzerland (Schweizer Hitparade)	28
UK Singles (Official Charts)	52
US Billboard Hot 100	11
US Hot R&B/Hip-Hop Songs (Billboard)	5
US Rhythmic Airplay (Billboard)	12
US Rolling Stone Top 100	1

=== Year-end charts ===
2019 year-end chart performance for "Hot"
Chart (2019)	Position
US Hot R&B/Hip-Hop Songs (Billboard)	52
US Rolling Stone Top 100	52

2020 year-end chart performance for "Hot"
Chart (2020)	Position
US Billboard Hot 100	72
US Hot R&B/Hip-Hop Songs (Billboard)	35

== Certifications ==
Certifications for "Hot"
Region	Certification	Certified units/sales
Australia (ARIA)	Gold	35,000^{‡}
Canada (Music Canada)	Gold	40,000^{‡}
Denmark (IFPI Danmark)	Gold	45,000^{‡}
France (SNEP)	Gold	100,000^{‡}
Italy (FIMI)	Gold	50,000^{‡}
New Zealand (RMNZ)	2× Platinum	60,000^{‡}
Poland (ZPAV)	Gold	25,000^{‡}
Portugal (AFP)	Gold	5,000^{‡}
United Kingdom (BPI)	Gold	400,000^{‡}
United States (RIAA)	Platinum	1,000,000^{‡}
^{‡} Sales+streaming figures based on certification alone.
