= Leave Me Alone (Flipp Dinero song) =

Single by Flipp Dinero

from the album Love for Guala
- Released: September 4, 2018
- Genre: Hip hop; trap
- Length: 3:15
- Label: Epic; We the Best; Cinematic
- Songwriters: Christopher Victor; Per Landaas; Mathias Rosenholm
- Producers: Young Forever Beats; Cast Beats

Music video
- Video on YouTube

"Leave Me Alone" is a song by American rapper Flipp Dinero. It was released as a single on September 4, 2018. The song was produced by Young Forever Beats and Cast Beats. The song received a boost in popularity from Odell Beckham Jr. dancing in an Instagram video. It was then featured in NBA Live 19, released in 2018. The song soon started to gain traction in September 2018 when it became the most added song on rhythmic radio on the week of September 11, 2018. It was named one of the five hip hop singles to watch of fall 2018 by Forbes.

== Music video ==
The video was released via WorldStarHipHop on May 15, 2018.

== Chart performance ==
Leave Me Alone debuted at number 96 on the US Billboard Hot 100 chart on the chart dated September 29, 2018. On the chart dated February 9, 2019, the song reached its peak on the number 20 on the chart. On November 6, 2020, the song was certified quadruple platinum by the Recording Industry Association of America (RIAA) for combined sales and streaming data of over four million units in the United States.

== Personnel ==
Credits adapted from Tidal.

- Young Forever – production
- Cast Beats – production

== Charts ==
=== Weekly charts ===
Chart (2018–2019)	Peak position
Australia (ARIA)	94
Belgium (Ultratip Bubbling Under Flanders)	15
Canada (Canadian Hot 100)	30
Ireland (IRMA)	74
New Zealand Hot Singles (RMNZ)	31
Portugal (AFP)	65
Sweden Heatseeker (Sverigetopplistan)	19
UK Singles (OCC)	30
US Billboard Hot 100	20
US Hot R&B/Hip-Hop Songs (Billboard)	10
US Rhythmic (Billboard)	4

=== Year-end charts ===
Chart (2019)	Position
US Billboard Hot 100	71
US Hot R&B/Hip-Hop Songs (Billboard)	31
US Rhythmic (Billboard)	29
US Rolling Stone Top 100	97

== Certifications ==
Region	Certification	Certified units/sales
Australia (ARIA)	Gold	35,000^{‡}
Canada (Music Canada)	3× Platinum	240,000^{‡}
Denmark (IFPI Danmark)	Gold	45,000^{‡}
New Zealand (RMNZ)	2× Platinum	60,000^{‡}
United Kingdom (BPI)	Platinum	600,000^{‡}
United States (RIAA)	4× Platinum	4,000,000^{‡}
^{‡} Sales+streaming figures based on certification alone.
