= The London =

2019 single by Young Thug featuring J. Cole and Travis Scott

Single by Young Thug featuring J. Cole and Travis Scott

from the album So Much Fun
- Released: May 23, 2019
- Studio: Electric Lady
- Genre: Hip hop
- Length: 3:20
- Label: 300; Atlantic
- Songwriters: Jeffery Williams; Jermaine Cole; Jacques Webster II; Tyler Williams; Kenneth Edmonds
- Producer: T-Minus

Young Thug singles chronology
"Anybody" (2018)	"The London" (2019)	"Goodbyes" (2019)

J. Cole singles chronology
"Purple Emoji" (2018)	"The London" (2019)	"Down Bad" (2019)

Travis Scott singles chronology
"Power Is Power" (2019)	"The London" (2019)	"Antisocial" (2019)

Music video
- "The London" on YouTube

"The London" is a song by American rapper Young Thug featuring fellow American rappers J. Cole and Travis Scott. It was released on May 23, 2019, by Atlantic Records and 300 Entertainment as the lead single from Young Thug's debut studio album So Much Fun on May 23, 2019. Written alongside Babyface and producer T-Minus, it was nominated for Best Rap/Sung Performance at the 62nd Grammy Awards.

== Background ==
The song is named after The London, a luxury hotel in West Hollywood, California.

== Composition ==
"The London" is in the key of E Minor at 98 BPM.

== Critical reception ==
Writing for Rolling Stone, Charles Holmes said that J. Cole "steals the show" and "sounds at home" on the track, and "outraps" Young Thug.

== Promotion ==
The collaboration was previously advertised on flyers at the Rolling Loud Festival in Miami on May 11, 2019, which said a "summer anthem" was coming from the three rappers.

== Music video ==
The music video for the song was released on August 1, 2019, on Young Thug's official YouTube channel.

== Personnel ==
Credits adapted from Geoff Ogunlesi's Instagram and Tidal.

- Young Thug – vocals, songwriting
- J. Cole – vocals, songwriting
- Travis Scott – vocals, songwriting
- Babyface - songwriting
- T-Minus – production, songwriting
- Gosha Usov – recording
- Juro "Mez" Davis – mixing
- Alex Tumay – mixing
- Jimmy Cash – additional mixing
- Joe LaPorta – mastering
- Shaan Singh – engineering

== Charts ==
=== Weekly charts ===
Chart (2019)	Peak position
Australia (ARIA)	17
Austria (Ö3 Austria Top 40)	37
Belgium (Ultratip Bubbling Under Flanders)	2
Belgium (Ultratip Bubbling Under Wallonia)	26
Canada (Canadian Hot 100)	6
Czech Republic (Singles Digitál Top 100)	66
Denmark (Tracklisten)	32
France (SNEP)	103
Germany (GfK)	71
Hungary (Stream Top 40)	20
Ireland (IRMA)	19
Italy (FIMI)	88
Latvia (LAIPA)	6
Lithuania (AGATA)	10
Netherlands (Single Top 100)	51
New Zealand (Recorded Music NZ)	8
Norway (VG-lista)	21
Portugal (AFP)	16
Slovakia (Singles Digitál Top 100)	33
Sweden (Sverigetopplistan)	40
Switzerland (Schweizer Hitparade)	20
UK Singles (OCC)	18
US Billboard Hot 100	12
US Hot R&B/Hip-Hop Songs (Billboard)	6
US Rhythmic Airplay (Billboard)	5
US Rolling Stone Top 100	13

=== Year-end charts ===
Chart (2019)	Position
Canada (Canadian Hot 100)	58
Latvia (LAIPA)	54
Portugal (AFP)	106
Switzerland (Schweizer Hitparade)	88
US Billboard Hot 100	64
US Hot R&B/Hip-Hop Songs (Billboard)	29
US Rhythmic (Billboard)	31
US Rolling Stone Top 100	43

== Certifications ==
Region	Certification	Certified units/sales
Australia (ARIA)	Platinum	70,000^{‡}
Canada (Music Canada)	2× Platinum	160,000^{‡}
Denmark (IFPI Danmark)	Platinum	90,000^{‡}
France (SNEP)	Gold	100,000^{‡}
Italy (FIMI)	Gold	35,000^{‡}
New Zealand (RMNZ)	2× Platinum	60,000^{‡}
Poland (ZPAV)	Gold	25,000^{‡}
Portugal (AFP)	Platinum	10,000^{‡}
United Kingdom (BPI)	Platinum	600,000^{‡}
United States (RIAA)	3× Platinum	3,000,000^{‡}
^{‡} Sales+streaming figures based on certification alone.

== Release history ==
Region	Date	Format	Label(s)	Ref.
Various	May 23, 2019	Digital download; streaming	300; Atlantic	
United Kingdom	June 7, 2019	Urban contemporary	300; Atlantic	
