= Flipp Dinero =

American rapper

- Born: Christopher Saint Victor; November 16, 1995 (age 30); Canarsie, Brooklyn, New York, U.S.
- Genres: East Coast hip-hop; trap
- Occupations: Rapper; singer; songwriter
- Years active: 2016–2021; 2025–present
- Labels: Cinematic; Epic; We the Best
- Producer(s): DJ Khaled

Christopher Saint Victor (born November 16, 1995), better known by his stage name Flipp Dinero, is an American rapper from Brooklyn, New York City. He is best known for his 2018 single "Leave Me Alone," which received quadruple platinum certification by the Recording Industry Association of America (RIAA) and peaked at number 20 on the Billboard Hot 100. After both football wide-receiver Odell Beckham Jr. and NBA player Jordan Bell danced to and performed the song on Instagram, it quickly gained viral status.

He was first discovered by fellow Brooklyn rapper Joey Badass, who led him to sign with Cinematic Music Group in May 2016, and two years later, Victor signed onto a joint venture with DJ Khaled's We the Best Music Group, an imprint of Epic Records to re-issue "Leave Me Alone" as a single in August 2018. The song served as the lead single for his debut studio album Love for Guala (2019), which was released in November of the following year to commercial failure.

== Early life ==
Flipp Dinero is from the Canarsie neighborhood of Brooklyn and is of Haitian descent. He was raised in a Christian home and attended private school in New York.

== Career ==
Flipp Dinero's music career began in 2016 with the support of his brother, Lows, a sound engineer. Lows promoted Flipp's music and connected him with other artists. During this time, Flipp Dinero received early recognition from fellow Brooklyn-based rapper Joey Badass who came across his songs "Smoke2This" and "I Do." Flipp Dinero signed with Cinematic Music Group in the summer of 2016 and later signed with DJ Khaled's We the Best Music Group, an imprint of Epic Records two years later. Flipp Dinero's music style combines R&B and gospel singing with rapping, hip-hop, and trap music.

In 2017, Flipp Dinero was featured five times on Spotify's popular hip-hop 'Most Necessary' playlist. Later in 2017, Flipp made his first performance on Complex with his single "I Do." This led to the release of his debut extended play The Guala Way in June 2017, which had been streamed over 2 million times on Spotify by the end of that year.

With the help of his brother, Flipp Dinero recorded and released his hit song, "Leave Me Alone" in 2018. The song was written as an expression of his troubles with a woman who would not leave him alone. In 2018, his song "Leave Me Alone" aired on multiple radio stations after recognition from Cleveland Browns' NFL football player, Odell Beckham Jr., who posted a dancing video to the song on Instagram. Months later, Canadian rapper Drake featured "Leave Me Alone" on his Instagram Story, naming it as an inspiration during the production of his fifth album, Scorpion. "Leave Me Alone", received platinum certification by the RIAA on January 15, 2019, and later double-platinum certification on May 23, 2019.

In 2019, Flipp Dinero was featured on hip-hop media company XXL 2019 Freshman class after performing his freestyle "What I Do". Later in 2019, Dinero released his debut studio album, Love for Guala to commercial failure, reaching number 132 on US Billboard 200. Its song, "How I Move", was written to share Dinero's experience in Canarsie as a rapper from a lower socio-economic area.

Flipp includes the word "Guala" into his work, an acronym for Gods, Unique, Accolade, Life, Acquired, and holds significant meaning to him.

== Discography ==
=== Studio albums ===
Title	Album details	Peak chart positions
Title	Album details	US
Love for Guala	Released: November 22, 2019; Label: Cinematic Music Group, Epic Records, We the Best Music; Format: Digital download, streaming	132

=== Mixtapes ===
List of mixtapes with selected details
Title	Details
Guala See Guala	Released: March 7, 2018; Label: Self-released; Format: Digital download, streaming

=== EPs ===
- The Guala Way (2017)
- Table for One (2021)

=== Singles ===
==== As lead artist ====
Title	Year	Peak chart positions								Certifications	Album
Title	Year	US	US R&B/HH	US Main. R&B/HH	US Rhy.	US R&B/HH Air.	AUS	CAN	UK	Certifications	Album
"Play Fair"	2017	—	—	—	—	—	—	—	—		Non-album single
"Say No More"	2017	—	—	—	—	—	—	—	—		The Guala Way
"I Do"	2017	—	—	—	—	—	—	—	—		The Guala Way
"Running Up Bands"	2017	—	—	—	—	—	—	—	—		The Guala Way
"On Some"	2017	—	—	—	—	—	—	—	—		The Guala Way
"Livin' It"	2018	—	—	—	—	—	—	—	—		Non-album singles
"Wanna Ball" (featuring Jay Critch)	2018	—	—	—	—	—	—	—	—		Non-album singles
"You Know It"	2018	—	—	—	—	—	—	—	—		Non-album singles
"Time Goes Down (Remix)" (featuring G Herbo)	2018	—	—	—	—	—	—	—	—		Non-album singles
"Leave Me Alone"	2018	20	11	3	4	4	94	30	30	RIAA: 4× Platinum; ARIA: Gold; BPI: Platinum; MC: 3× Platinum	Love for Guala
"How I Move" (featuring Lil Baby)	2019	— (Note: "How I Move" did not enter the Billboard Hot 100 but peaked at number 6 on the Bubbling Under Hot 100 Singles chart.)	—	15	34	25	—	—	—	RIAA: 2× Platinum	Love for Guala
"If I Tell You"	2019	—	—	—	—	—	—	—	—		Love for Guala
"No No No" (featuring A Boogie wit da Hoodie)	2020	—	—	40	—	—	—	—	—		TBA

==== As featured artist ====
List of singles as featured artist, details of year and album
Year	Title	Album
2018	"To Light" (Kittens featuring Flipp Dinero and Killison)	Zanon & On
2018	"Hunnit & Fifty" (Najjee featuring Flipp Dinero)	Non-album singles
2019	"Magic" (Jovanie featuring Flipp Dinero)	Non-album singles
2019	"All I Want" (T-Pain featuring Flipp Dinero)	1UP
2020	"Milli" (Static & Ben El featuring Flipp Dinero)	Non-album single

== Television performances ==
Flipp Dinero performed his song "Leave Me Alone" for both the 2018 Hip-Hop BET Awards and the 2019 BET awards.
