= Clout (song) =

Single by Offset featuring Cardi B

from the album Father of 4
- Released: March 15, 2019
- Length: 3:25
- Label: Quality Control; Motown; Capitol
- Songwriters: Kiari Cephus; Belcalis Almanzar; Joshua Luellen; Kevin Gomringer; Tim Gomringer
- Producers: Southside; Cubeatz

Offset singles chronology
"Red Room" (2019)	"Clout" (2019)	"Enzo" (2019)

Cardi B singles chronology
"Please Me" (2019)	"Clout" (2019)	"Press" (2019)

Music video
- "Clout ft. Cardi B" on YouTube

"Clout" is a song by American rapper Offset featuring his then-wife, fellow American rapper Cardi B, released as the second single from his debut solo album Father of 4 on March 15, 2019. Although the song initially charted following the album's release, it reached the top 40 of the US Billboard Hot 100 after the release of its music video in April 2019. It received a nomination for Best Rap Performance at the 62nd Grammy Awards, marking Offset's first nomination as a soloist outside of Migos.

== Background ==
The song is a criticism of those who use others for fame, including social climbers or "clout chasers", with the lyrics calling out those who have "the Instagram disease". "Clout" marks Offset and Cardi B's fifth collaboration, following "Um Yea", "Lick (Remix)", "MotorSport" and "Drip".

== Critical reception ==
Writing for AllMusic, Fred Thomas opined that the song "is made by Cardi B's high-energy, high-confrontation cameo." Charles Holmes of Rolling Stone found Cardi's performance "brutal, swift and nimble" and considered it among the best on the album; he noted the song features her "dismantling a variety of unnamed detractors: rappers, blogs, trolls." In NME, Sam Moore opined that Cardi B demonstrates "her show-stopping prowess" in her verse. HotNewHipHop stated that "hip-hop's power couple" delivers "the hardest-hitting banger on the project, blasting the opps while they're at it." In Exclaim!, Kyle Mullin described it as a "swaggering, ominous keys peppered" song, where Cardi B sounds "like the biggest rapper in the world as she nimbly mocks gossipy, nosy haters trolling her in vain." Similarly, Highsnobiety's Thomas Hobbs said that her verse delivers "a necessary dose of energy."

In Consequence of Sound, Wren Graves found "explosive potential" in the song, and noticed that in an album lyrically centered on his personal life, Offset "has retreated to platitudes" and "turn their attention to bloggers" instead of giving details about their relationship, further commenting, "perhaps the marriage wasn't in a place where the couple felt comfortable discussing it." Brian Josephs of Entertainment Weekly deemed the song "a gem", "anchored by a Cardi B verse" to "express her indignation," and noted the hook "features a relatable amount of deadpanned disgust;" however, Josephs felt "unfortunate" that "a song about clout chasers is a highlight from an album introducing a family man." Trent Clarck of HipHopDX felt the performers "can absolutely do better."

== Music video ==
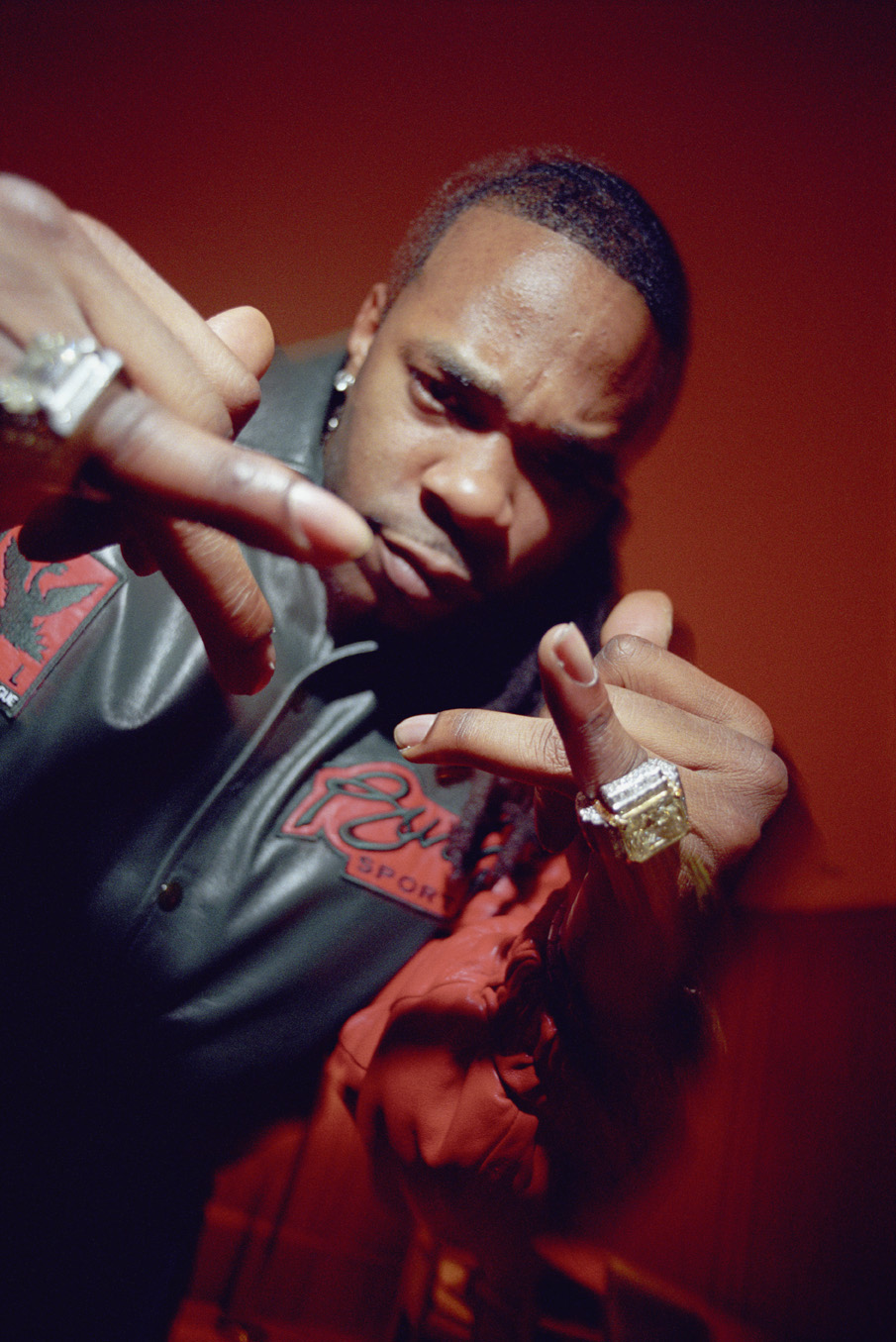
Offset cited Busta Rhymes' work as an inspiration for the visuals.

The Daniel Russell-directed music video was announced by Cardi B on April 16 and released on April 17, 2019. Offset and Joseph Desrosiers Jr. served as creative directors. It features Offset and Cardi B delivering their verses in a yellow and black hall of mirrors. Offset plays piano while wearing a couture hockey mask, and then uses a bright-yellow chainsaw to cut a black cake. Cardi B is shown in an all-yellow outfit in a pile of lemons, and also wearing all-black leather bondage outfit giving a lap dance to Offset in another scene. It was inspired by Busta Rhymes' video for "What's It Gonna Be?!" featuring Janet Jackson (1999). In Stereogum, Tom Breihan praised it saying "the whole thing rules" and called it "a really great music video." Vulture called the video "mostly just an excuse for Offset to show off his piano fingers and Cardi to get her freak on in some increasingly elaborate outfits".

== Live performances ==
Cardi and Offset both performed "Clout" at the 2019 BET Awards, along with a performance of "Press". They also performed "Clout" on Jimmy Kimmel Live! on July 17, 2019.

== Awards and nominations ==
Year	Ceremony	Category	Result	Ref.
2019	BET Hip Hop Awards	Sweet 16: Best Featured Verse	Nominated	
2020	Grammy Awards	Best Rap Performance	Nominated	
2020	ASCAP Rhythm & Soul Music Awards	Winning Songs	Won	

== Personnel ==
Credits adapted from the liner notes of Father of 4.

Personnel

- Offset - primary vocalist, songwriting
- Cardi B - featured artist, songwriting
- Leland Wayne - production, songwriting
- Joshua Luellen - production, songwriting
- Kevin Gomringer - production, songwriting
- Tim Gomringer - production, songwriting
- JRich ENT. - recording
- Evan LeRay - recording
- Thomas "Tillie" Mann - mixing
- DJ Durel - mixing
- Ethan Stevens - mixing

Recording and management

- Recorded at Offset Studios LA (Los Angeles, California)
- Mixed at Mama's House Studios (Atlanta, Georgia)
- Published by YRN Piped Up Ent/JPL QC Music/Reservoir Media Music (ASCAP), Washpoppin/Sony/ATV Allegro (ASCAP), Want Some More/ Songs Of Universal, Inc (BMI), Royal Legend Publishing/Warner-Tamerlane Publishing Corp (BMI), Sony/ATV Music Publishing (BMI), and Songs Of Universal, Inc (BMI)
- Cardi B appears courtesy of KSR/Atlantic Recording Corporation

== Charts ==
=== Weekly charts ===
Chart (2019)	Peak position
Canada Hot 100 (Billboard)	41
Greece International Digital (IFPI Greece)	12
Ireland (IRMA)	54
New Zealand Hot Singles (RMNZ)	22
UK Singles (Official Charts)	64
UK Hip Hop/R&B (Official Charts)	36
US Billboard Hot 100	39
US Hot R&B/Hip-Hop Songs (Billboard)	17
US Rhythmic Airplay (Billboard)	33
US Rolling Stone Top 100	76

=== Year-end charts ===
Chart (2019)	Position
US Billboard Hot 100	87
US Hot R&B/Hip-Hop Songs (Billboard)	36

== Certifications ==
Region	Certification	Certified units/sales
Brazil (Pro-Música Brasil)	Platinum	40,000^{‡}
France (SNEP)	Gold	100,000^{‡}
New Zealand (RMNZ)	Platinum	30,000^{‡}
Portugal (AFP)	Gold	5,000^{‡}
United Kingdom (BPI)	Silver	200,000^{‡}
United States (RIAA)	3× Platinum	3,000,000^{‡}
^{‡} Sales+streaming figures based on certification alone.
