= Envy Me =

Single by Calboy

from the EP Wildboy
- Released: September 13, 2018
- Length: 2:00
- Label: Polo Grounds Music; RCA
- Songwriter(s): Calvin Woods
- Producer(s): JTK

Music video
- "Envy Me" on YouTube

"Envy Me" is the debut single by American rapper and singer Calboy. It was released on September 13, 2018, as the lead single from his debut EP Wildboy. It is known as his breakout single. The song peaked at number 31 on the Billboard Hot 100, making it his first song to chart and his first top 40 entry. It has become a staple on SoundCloud, achieving over 130 million streams. Rolling Stone called it "one of the most successful rap records in the country" at the peak of the song's popularity (in the United States).

== Critical reception ==
Rolling Stone called the song "eerie, bright and hyper-violent", and that it "revels in the dichotomy of Calboy's delivery and is one of the reasons it's an off-kilter hit."

== Music video ==
A music video was released on Calboy's official YouTube channel on August 27, 2018, before the supposed release of the single. It reached 25 million views by January 2019 and as of May 19, 2021, it has amassed over 200 million views.

== Charts ==
=== Weekly charts ===
Chart (2018–2019)	Peak position
Canada (Canadian Hot 100)	51
Sweden Heatseeker (Sverigetopplistan)	8
US Billboard Hot 100	31
US Hot R&B/Hip-Hop Songs (Billboard)	14
US Rhythmic (Billboard)	29
US Rolling Stone Top 100	54

=== Year-end charts ===
Chart (2019)	Position
US Billboard Hot 100	59
US Hot R&B/Hip-Hop Songs (Billboard)	27
US Rolling Stone Top 100	44

== Certifications ==
Region	Certification	Certified units/sales
Canada (Music Canada)	2× Platinum	160,000^{‡}
New Zealand (RMNZ)	Platinum	30,000^{‡}
United Kingdom (BPI)	Silver	200,000^{‡}
United States (RIAA)	5× Platinum	5,000,000^{‡}
^{‡} Sales+streaming figures based on certification alone.
