= Robbery (Juice Wrld song) =

2019 single by Juice Wrld

Single by Juice Wrld

from the album Death Race for Love
- Released: February 13, 2019
- Recorded: January 2018
- Genre: Emo rap; trap; alternative R&B
- Length: 4:00
- Label: Grade A; Interscope
- Songwriters: Jarad Higgins; Nick Mira
- Producer: Nick Mira

Juice Wrld singles chronology
"Roses" (2018)	"Robbery" (2019)	"Hear Me Calling" (2019)

Music video
- "Robbery" on YouTube

"Robbery" is a song by the late American rapper Juice Wrld. It was released on February 13, 2019, via Grade A Productions through exclusive licensing to Interscope Records, as the lead single for his second studio album, Death Race for Love. "Robbery" has over a billion streams on Spotify.

== Background ==
An emotional separation-themed song, "Robbery" was described as being about "a woman stealing Juice's heart", by Complex and how Juice takes revenge against her while consuming liquor.

It was produced by Nick Mira, who also produced Juice's multi-platinum-certified single "Lucid Dreams". Rolling Stone described the song as "dark and melodramatic" while calling it "a clunky metaphor about a woman demanding love" from Juice.

Lyrically, the first verse discusses the comparison of Juice's father advising him about not revealing his insecurities to women and his heart's stance of the contrary.

XXL noted the song as a "heartfelt track about a love that has left Juice broken and confused," while Highsnobiety identified it as a "melancholic lamenting about a past love."

== Music video ==
The official music video for the song was published on Valentine's Day to Lyrical Lemonade, a YouTube channel owned by Cole Bennett, who directed the video along with several of Juice's other music videos.

Bennett was noted for "bringing his after-effects-addled eye" to the video of "Robbery" and "providing it with the same bugged out visual energy" of "Lucid Dreams". Artistically, the video was described as having "splashes of flames" in many scenes while lacking Bennett's signature neon and warping effects.

HipHopDX described the plot as an emo-crooning of Juice while being "surrounded by a background of fire".

Plot-wise, Juice is shown drinking a bottle of Hennessy while walking through the wedding of his ex-lover with another person, to "numb the pain" and "deal with the agony". Shortly after, while leaving, he throws his burning cigarette onto a flower held by a guest, eventually causing the venue's destruction.

The video performance was officially uploaded to the Lyrical Lemonade YouTube channel (as many other Juice songs) on February 14, 2019, a day after the single's release. As of June 2026, the music video has reached more than 587 million views.

== Personnel ==
Adapted from Tidal.

- Jarad Higgins – vocals, composition
- Nick Mira – producer, composition
- Brandon Dickinson Jr. – mixing, studio person

== Charts ==
=== Weekly charts ===
Chart (2019–2020)	Peak position
Australia (ARIA)	41
Austria (Ö3 Austria Top 40)	58
Belgium (Ultratip Bubbling Under Flanders)	18
Canada Hot 100 (Billboard)	22
Czech Republic Singles Digital (ČNS IFPI)	64
Denmark (Tracklisten)	37
Germany (GfK)	99
Global 200 (Billboard)	123
Greece (IFPI)	33
Ireland (IRMA)	22
Latvia (LAIPA)	15
Lithuania (AGATA)	29
Netherlands (Single Top 100)	81
New Zealand (Recorded Music NZ)	33
Norway (VG-lista)	24
Portugal (AFP)	79
Slovakia Singles Digital (ČNS IFPI)	45
Sweden (Sverigetopplistan)	56
Switzerland (Schweizer Hitparade)	92
UK Singles (Official Charts)	39
UK Hip Hop/R&B (Official Charts)	19
US Billboard Hot 100	27
US Hot R&B/Hip-Hop Songs (Billboard)	13
US Hot Rap Songs (Billboard)	12
US Rolling Stone Top 100	29

=== Year-end charts ===
Chart (2019)	Position
Canada (Canadian Hot 100)	86
US Billboard Hot 100	100
US Hot R&B/Hip-Hop Songs (Billboard)	43
US Rolling Stone Top 100	49

Chart (2021)	Position
Portugal (AFP)	192

== Certifications ==
Region	Certification	Certified units/sales
Australia (ARIA)	3× Platinum	210,000^{‡}
Austria (IFPI Austria)	Gold	15,000^{‡}
Brazil (Pro-Música Brasil)	Platinum	40,000^{‡}
Canada (Music Canada)	Gold	40,000^{‡}
Denmark (IFPI Danmark)	Platinum	90,000^{‡}
France (SNEP)	Gold	100,000^{‡}
Germany (BVMI)	Gold	200,000^{‡}
Italy (FIMI)	Gold	35,000^{‡}
New Zealand (RMNZ)	3× Platinum	90,000^{‡}
Poland (ZPAV)	Platinum	50,000^{‡}
Portugal (AFP)	Platinum	10,000^{‡}
Spain (Promusicae)	Gold	30,000^{‡}
United Kingdom (BPI)	2× Platinum	1,200,000^{‡}
United States (RIAA)	5× Platinum	5,000,000^{‡}
Streaming
Greece (IFPI Greece)	Gold	1,000,000^{†}
^{‡} Sales+streaming figures based on certification alone.^{†} Streaming-only figures based on certification alone.

== Release history ==
Region	Date	Format	Label	Ref.
Various	February 13, 2019	Digital download	Interscope; Grade A	
Australia	February 13, 2019	Contemporary hit radio	Universal Music Australia	
