= Calboy =

American rapper (born 1999)

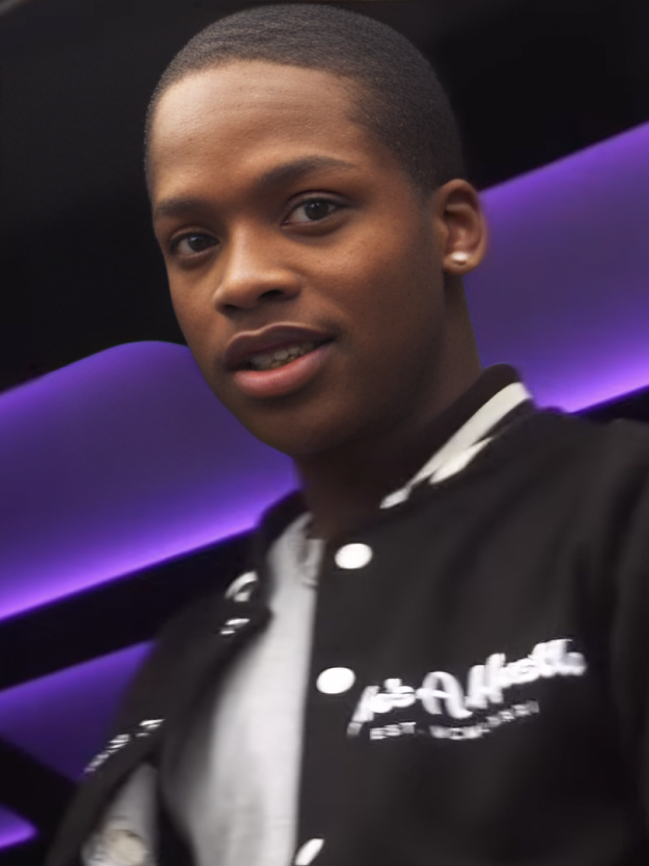
- Calboy in May 2018

Background information
- Also known as: 147Calboy
- Born: Calvin Lashon Woods; April 3, 1999 (age 27); Chicago, Illinois, U.S.
- Origin: Calumet City, Illinois, U.S.
- Genres: Midwestern hip-hop; drill
- Occupations: Rapper; singer; songwriter
- Years active: 2014–present
- Labels: Polo Grounds; RCA

Calvin Lashon Woods (born April 3, 1999), better known by his stage name Calboy (/ˈkælbɔɪ/), is an American rapper from Calumet City, Illinois. He is best known for his 2018 single "Envy Me", which received quintuple platinum certification by the Recording Industry Association of America (RIAA) and peaked within the top 40 of the Billboard Hot 100. Its success led him to sign with Polo Grounds Music, an imprint of RCA Records. His debut extended play, Wildboy (2018), peaked at number 30 on the Billboard 200, while his second, Love Live the Kings (2020), lukewarmly entered the chart.

== Early life ==
On April 3, 1999, Calvin Lashon Woods was born on the South Side of Chicago; he later relocated to Calumet City, Illinois. Woods turned to music to channel the frustrations of growing up below the poverty line. He is one of five children raised by a single mother.

Woods witnessed two of his best friends die, one of a drug overdose and the other to gun violence. His family migrated between small homes to small apartments. His cousin is late rapper King Von.

== Career ==
=== 2016–2017: Career beginnings ===
On July 7, 2017, Calboy released his debut mixtape, The Chosen One. Later that year, Calboy released his second mixtape, Anxiety, on December 7, 2017.

=== 2018–2021: Numerous mixtapes, EPs and RCA Records ===
On June 18, 2018, Woods released his third mixtape, Calboy, the Wildboy. A single off the project was titled, "Unjudge Me", which featured Moneybagg Yo.

He released his single "Envy Me" on September 13, 2018, to critical acclaim. It later served as the lead single for his debut EP Wildboy, released on May 31, 2019. "Envy Me" peaked at number 31 on the Billboard Hot 100 and was certified quintuple platinum by the Recording Industry Association of America (RIAA). With the single's success came the signage of Calboy to Polo Grounds Music, distributed by RCA Records. At the time, the label had already ended their partnership with ASAP Rocky following the May release of his third album, Testing. It was also rumored that Calboy also signed a management deal with Meek Mill's label, Dream Chasers, but he hinted that he left the label in 2021 after a financial disagreement.

The Wildboy EP was followed by another EP, Long Live The Kings, released in March 2020, with the latter receiving a deluxe version the following July, including 6 new tracks. On August 11, Calboy was included on XXL's 2020 Freshman Class.

On March 22, 2021, "Miseducation" featuring fellow rapper Lil Wayne was released as the lead single from Calboy's debut album, Redemption, supposed to be released the same year, but was postponed. Swae Lee was also set to make an appearance on the album. Calboy claimed that the album was completed.

=== 2022–present ===
Calboy publicly disclosed his frustrations with Polo Grounds and RCA Records in 2022, stating that he was being treated like a "label slave". He released his Black Heart EP in 2022. After leaving RCA, he released Unchained under his own independent label. He released Wildboy 2 in January 2026.

== Artistry ==
=== Influences ===
Woods has cited his influences as Tupac Shakur, Michael Jackson, Sherwood, Fuel, Chance the Rapper, The Starting Line, Chief Keef, New Found Glory, G Herbo, The All American Rejects, and 50 Cent.

Woods' rap moniker comes from combining his government name Calvin and the character Cowboy from the 1979 cult film The Warriors.

== Discography ==
=== Albums ===
Title	Details
Unchained	Released: November 3, 2023; Label: Self-released; Format: Digital download, streaming
Wildboy 2	Released: January 2, 2026; Label: Self-released; Format: Digital download, streaming

=== Mixtapes ===
List of mixtapes, with selected details
Title	Details
The Chosen One	Released: July 7, 2017; Label: Paper Gang Inc.; Format: Digital download
Anxiety	Released: December 7, 2017; Label: Paper Gang Inc.; Format: Digital download
Calboy, the Wildboy	Released: June 18, 2018; Label: Paper Gang Inc.; Format: Digital download

=== Extended plays ===
List of EPs with selected details
Title	Details	Peak chart positions				Sales	Certifications
Title	Details	US	US R&B/HH	US Rap	CAN	Sales	Certifications
Wildboy	Released: May 31, 2019; Label: Polo Grounds Music, RCA; Format: Digital download, streaming	30	18	16	62	US: 16,000	RIAA: Gold
Long Live The Kings	Released: February 25, 2020; Label: Polo Grounds Music, RCA; Format: Digital download, streaming	136	—	—	—		
Black Heart	Released: September 9, 2022; Label: Polo Grounds Music, RCA; Format: Digital download, streaming	—	—	—	—		
Sorry 4 The Leaks Vol. 1	Released: December 8, 2023; Label: Self-released; Format: Digital download, streaming	—	—	—	—		
Sorry 4 The Leaks Vol. 2	Released: July 19, 2024; Label: Self-released; Format: Digital download, streaming	—	—	—	—		
"—" denotes a title that did not chart, or was not released in that territory.

=== Singles ===
List of singles showing year released and album name
Title	Year	Peak chart positions			Certifications	Album
Title	Year	US	US R&B/HH	CAN	Certifications	Album
"Envy Me"	2018	31	14	51	RIAA: 5× Platinum; MC: 2× Platinum	Wildboy
"Caroline" (featuring Polo G)	2019	—	—	—		Wildboy
"Unjudge Me" (featuring Moneybagg Yo)	2019	—	—	—		Wildboy
"Chariot" (featuring Meek Mill, Lil Durk and Young Thug)	2019	—	— (Note: "Chariot" did not chart on the Hot R&B/Hip-Hop Songs chart, but did peak at number two on the Bubbling Under Hot R&B/Hip-Hop Singles chart.)	—	RIAA: Gold	Wildboy
"Purpose" (featuring G Herbo)	2019	—	—	—		Long Live the Kings
"Barbarian" (featuring Lil Tjay)	2020	—	—	—		Long Live the Kings
"Brand New" (featuring King Von)	2020	—	—	—		Long Live the Kings
"Rounds" (featuring Fivio Foreign)	2020	—	—	—		Long Live the Kings
"—" denotes a title that did not chart, or was not released in that territory.

=== Guest appearances ===
Title	Year	Other artist(s)	Album
"Get a Bag"	2019	Chance the Rapper	The Big Day
"100k On a Coupe"	2019	Pop Smoke	—N/a
"Diana (Remix)"	2020	Pop Smoke, King Combs	Shoot for the Stars, Aim for the Moon (Deluxe)
"Thug Kry"	2020	YG, Lil Mosey	My Life 4Hunnid
"Why?"	2024	Houdini	HOU I'M MEANT TO BE

== Tours ==
=== Headlining ===
- Rockstar Wild Boyz Tour (2019)

=== Supporting act ===
- Dying to Live Tour (Kodak Black) (2019)
- I Am > I Was Tour (21 Savage) (2019)
