= Juice Wrld discography =

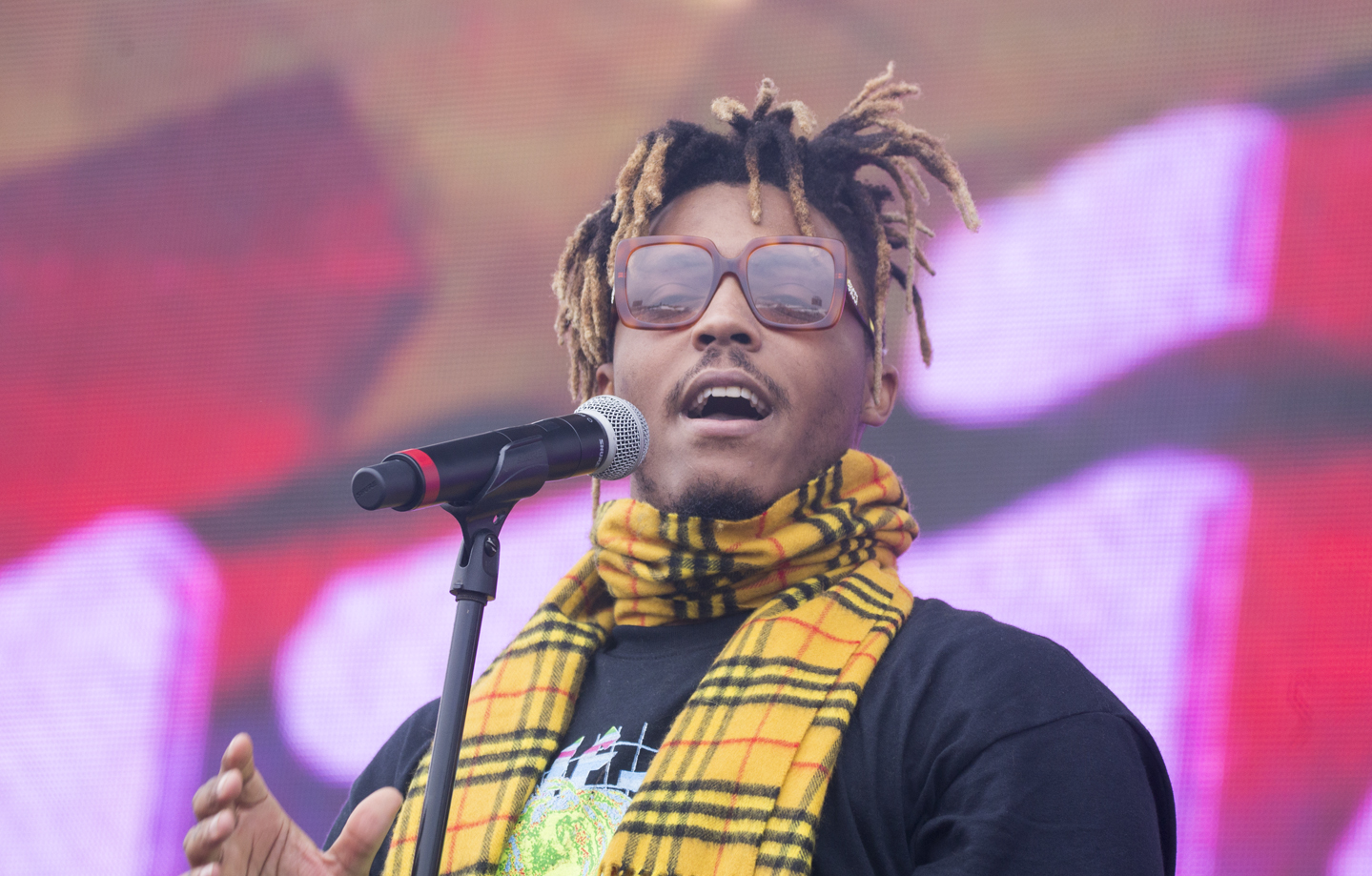
- Juice Wrld performing in May 2019
- Studio albums: 5
- EPs: 11
- Singles: 46
- Music videos: 46
- Mixtapes: 2
- Collaborative mixtapes: 1
- Promotional singles: 2

American rapper Juice Wrld released five studio albums, eleven extended plays, two mixtapes, 46 singles (including three as featured artist), and two promotional singles. Three of the albums were released posthumously.

He released his first mixtape and EP, under the stage name JuiceTheKidd in early 2015 and 2016. Throughout 2017, he released several EPs independently. Following his signing to Grade A, a subsidiary of Interscope, Juice Wrld released his debut album Goodbye & Good Riddance on May 25, 2018. The album debuted at number 15 and peaked at number four on the Billboard 200. On December 5, 2018, the album was certified platinum by the Recording Industry Association of America (RIAA). It spawned five singles, including his debut single "All Girls Are the Same", certified sextuple platinum and his breakthrough hit "Lucid Dreams", which peaked at number two on the Billboard Hot 100 and is certified Diamond, by the RIAA. In June 2018, Juice Wrld released a tribute EP, Too Soon.., in honor of deceased rappers Lil Peep and XXXTentacion. The EP produced the singles "Rich and Blind" and "Legends", which were respectively certified gold and platinum by the RIAA. Juice Wrld released a collaborative mixtape alongside Future, titled Wrld on Drugs on October 19, 2018. It debuted at number two on the Billboard 200, selling 98,000 album-equivalent units, which included 8,000 pure album sales. Furthermore, it peaked in the top 20 in Denmark, Sweden, Netherlands, Norway and peaked at number five in Canada. The mixtape was supported through the single "Fine China", which peaked at number 26 on the Billboard Hot 100 and is certified 2× platinum by the RIAA.

Juice Wrld's second studio album Death Race for Love, was released on March 8, 2019. Led by the singles "Robbery" and "Hear Me Calling", it debuted at number one on the Billboard 200 with 165,000 album-equivalent units. "Bandit" with YoungBoy Never Broke Again was Juice Wrld's final release before his death. (Note: While "Bandit" was Juice Wrld's final release of new material before his death, Interscope Records had given "Let Me Know (I Wonder Why Freestyle)", a song originally released in 2017 on Juice Wrld's SoundCloud as part of his 9 9 9 EP, an official release hours before his death.)

On April 23, 2020, Higgins' estate announced on his Instagram account that his first posthumous single, "Righteous", would be released later that night. "Righteous" was released at midnight on April 24, 2020, and an accompanying music video with footage of Higgins was uploaded to his YouTube channel. Higgins recorded the song at his home studio in Los Angeles. On May 29, the song "Tell Me U Luv Me" featuring Trippie Redd was released alongside a music video directed by Cole Bennett. These songs are included on his first posthumous album, titled Legends Never Die.

On July 6, Higgins' estate publicly announced his first posthumous album Legends Never Die. On the same day, Higgins' estate also released "Life's a Mess" featuring Halsey and "Come & Go" a few days later on July 9 featuring Marshmello. The album was released on July 10, 2020, with 21 songs and five singles that Higgins' estate claims "best represents the music Juice was in the process of creating". The album debuted at number one on the Billboard 200 with 497,000 album-equivalent units. Five of the songs reached the top 10 of the Billboard Hot 100 on the week ending July 25, 2020: "Come & Go", "Wishing Well", "Conversations", "Life's a Mess", and "Hate the Other Side", which reached number two, five, seven, nine, and ten, respectively. Higgins is the third artist to ever accomplish this feat, the other two being The Beatles and Drake. "Life's a Mess" notably jumped from number 74 to number nine that week. Juice Wrld's fifth studio album, The Party Never Ends, was released on November 29, 2024, nearly five years after his death. The project includes 18 tracks.

== Studio albums ==
List of studio albums, with selected details and chart positions
Title	Album details	Peak chart positions										Sales (Note: Sales figures for albums, EPs, and singles are pure sales that do not take equivalent units into account.)	Certifications
Title	Album details	US	AUS	CAN	DEN	GER	IRE	NOR	NZ	SWE	UK	Sales	Certifications
Goodbye & Good Riddance	Released: May 23, 2018; Labels: Grade A, Interscope; Formats: LP, DL, streaming	4	17	5	5	54	16	5	15	7	23	US: 149,000 (Note: In 2018, the album sold 23,000 pure copies, 11,000 in 2019, 29,000 in 2020, 39,000 in 2021, and 47,000 in 2022.)	RIAA: 5× Platinum; ARIA: Platinum; BPI: 2× Platinum; BVMI: Gold; IFPI DEN: 4× Platinum; MC: 5× Platinum; RMNZ: 4× Platinum
Death Race for Love	Released: March 8, 2019; Labels: Grade A, Interscope; Formats: CD, LP, DL, streaming	1	8	1	4	32	9	6	4	4	12	US: 92,800 (Note: In 2019, the album sold 61,000 pure copies, and 31,900 in 2020.)	RIAA: 2× Platinum; ARIA: Gold; BPI: Platinum; IFPI DEN: Platinum; RMNZ: 2× Platinum
Legends Never Die	Released: July 10, 2020; Labels: Grade A, Interscope; Formats: CD, LP, cassette, DL, streaming	1	1	1	1	4	1	1	1	3	1	US: 392,000 (Note: From July 2020 to January 2021, the album sold 301,000 pure copies, 65,000 in 2021, and 26,000 in 2022); CAN: 8,000 (Note: Canada sales figure for Legends Never Die in 2021.)	RIAA: 2× Platinum; ARIA: Platinum; BPI: Platinum; BVMI: Gold; IFPI DEN: 2× Platinum; RMNZ: 3× Platinum
Fighting Demons	Released: December 10, 2021; Labels: Grade A, Interscope; Formats: CD, LP, DL, streaming	2	7	3	6	12	12	5	4	13	8	US: 47,000 (Note: In 2022, the album sold 47,000 pure copies)	BPI: Gold; IFPI DEN: Gold; RMNZ: Gold
The Party Never Ends	Released: November 29, 2024; Labels: Grade A, Interscope; Formats: CD, LP, DL, streaming	4	17	5	14	27	12	12	14	26	5		BPI: Silver
"—" denotes a recording that did not chart or was not released in that territory.

== Mixtapes ==
List of mixtapes, with selected details and chart positions
Title	Mixtape details	Peak chart positions										Certifications
Title	Mixtape details	US	AUS	AUT	CAN	DEN	GER	NOR	NZ	SWE	UK	Certifications
What Is Love? (as JuicetheKidd)	Released: February 9, 2015; Label: Self-released; Format: Streaming	—	—	—	—	—	—	—	—	—	—	
Wrld on Drugs (with Future)	Released: October 19, 2018; Label: Interscope, Grade A, Epic, Freebandz; Format: Cassette, digital download	2	28	44	5	18	87	11	28	17	23	RIAA: Platinum; BPI: Silver; MC: Platinum; RMNZ: Gold
"—" denotes a recording that did not chart or was not released in that territory.

== Extended plays ==
List of extended plays, with selected details
Title	EP details
Juiced Up the EP (as JuicetheKidd)	Released: January 31, 2016; Label: Self-released; Format: Streaming
Twilight Zone (as JuicetheKidd)	Released: July 6, 2016; Label: Self-released; Format: Streaming
Affliction (as Juice)	Released: February 17, 2017; Label: Self-released; Format: Streaming
Heartbroken in Hollywood 9 9 9	Released: April 12, 2017; Label: Self-released; Format: Streaming
JuiceWrld 9 9 9	Released: June 15, 2017; Label: Self-released; Format: Streaming
BingeDrinkingMusic	Released: October 29, 2017; Label: Self-released; Format: Streaming
Nothings Different </3	Released: December 22, 2017; Label: Self-released; Format: Streaming
Too Soon..	Released: June 19, 2018; Labels: Grade A, Interscope; Format: Streaming, digital download
The Pre-Party	Released: September 9, 2024; Labels: Grade A, Interscope; Format: Streaming

== Singles ==
=== As lead artist ===
List of singles as lead artist, with selected chart positions, showing year released and album name
Title	Year	Peak chart positions										Certifications	Album
Title	Year	US	US R&B /HH	AUS	AUT	CAN	DEN	GER	NZ	SWE	UK	Certifications	Album
"All Girls Are the Same"	2018	41	20	98	—	54	—	—	—	— (Note: "All Girls Are the Same" did not enter the Swedish Singellista Chart, but peaked at number three on the Swedish Heatseeker Chart.)	53	RIAA: 8× Platinum; ARIA: 2× Platinum; BPI: Platinum; BVMI: Gold; IFPI AUT: Platinum; IFPI DEN: Platinum; MC: 8× Platinum; RMNZ: 4× Platinum	Nothings Different </3 and Goodbye & Good Riddance
"Lucid Dreams"	2018	2	1	8	26	4	11	36	3	5	10	RIAA: 11× Platinum; ARIA: 6× Platinum; BPI: 3× Platinum; BVMI: 3× Gold; GLF: Platinum; IFPI AUT: 2× Platinum; IFPI DEN: 2× Platinum; MC: 5× Platinum; RMNZ: 6× Platinum	JuiceWrld 9 9 9 and Goodbye & Good Riddance
"Lean wit Me"	2018	68	26	—	—	72	—	—	—	— (Note: "Lean wit Me" did not enter the Swedish Singellista Chart, but peaked at number 20 on the Swedish Heatseeker Chart.)	—	RIAA: 5× Platinum; ARIA: Gold; BPI: Platinum; IFPI AUT: Gold; IFPI DEN: Gold; MC: 5× Platinum; RMNZ: 2× Platinum	Goodbye & Good Riddance
"Rich and Blind"	2018	—	—	—	—	—	—	—	—	—	—	RIAA: Platinum; RMNZ: Gold	Too Soon.. and Fighting Demons
"Legends"	2018	29	13	97	—	26	—	—	— (Note: "Legends" did not enter the NZ Top 40 Singles Chart, but peaked at number three on the NZ Heatseeker Singles Chart.)	— (Note: "Legends" did not enter the Swedish Singellista Chart, but peaked at number six on the Swedish Heatseeker Chart.)	98	RIAA: 2× Platinum; ARIA: Gold; BPI: Gold; IFPI DEN: Gold; MC: Gold; RMNZ: Platinum	Too Soon.. and Fighting Demons
"Wasted" (featuring Lil Uzi Vert)	2018	67	27	—	—	69	—	—	— (Note: "Wasted" did not enter the NZ Top 40 Singles Chart, but peaked at number 17 on the NZ Hot Singles Chart.)	—	—	RIAA: 3× Platinum; ARIA: Gold; BPI: Silver; MC: 3× Platinum; RMNZ: Platinum	Goodbye & Good Riddance
"Fine China" (with Future)	2018	26	14	85	61	24	—	—	— (Note: "Fine China" did not enter the NZ Top 40 Singles Chart, but peaked at number nine on the NZ Hot Singles Chart.)	54	55	RIAA: 3× Platinum; BPI: Silver; MC: 4× Platinum; RMNZ: Platinum	Wrld on Drugs
"Armed and Dangerous"	2018	44	19	—	—	42	—	—	— (Note: "Armed and Dangerous" did not enter the NZ Top 40 Singles Chart, but peaked at number five on the NZ Hot Singles Chart.)	61	80	RIAA: 5× Platinum; ARIA: Gold; BPI: Platinum; IFPI AUT: Gold; IFPI DEN: Gold; MC: 5× Platinum; RMNZ: 2× Platinum	Goodbye & Good Riddance
"Roses" (with Benny Blanco featuring Brendon Urie)	2018	85	—	—	—	58	—	—	— (Note: "Roses" did not enter the NZ Top 40 Singles Chart, but peaked at number 10 on the NZ Hot Singles Chart.)	— (Note: "Roses" did not enter the Swedish Singellista Chart, but peaked at number five on the Swedish Heatseeker Chart.)	—	RIAA: 2× Platinum; BPI: Silver; IFPI DEN: Gold; MC: Platinum; RMNZ: Platinum	Friends Keep Secrets
"Robbery"	2019	27	13	41	58	22	37	99	33	56	39	RIAA: 5× Platinum; ARIA: 3× Platinum; BPI: 2× Platinum; BVMI: Gold; IFPI AUT: Gold; IFPI DEN: Platinum; MC: Gold; RMNZ: 3× Platinum	Death Race for Love
"Hear Me Calling"	2019	38	16	54	—	45	—	—	— (Note: "Hear Me Calling" did not enter the NZ Top 40 Singles Chart, but peaked at number nine on the NZ Hot Singles Chart.)	— (Note: "Hear Me Calling" did not enter the Swedish Singellista Chart, but peaked at number six on the Swedish Heatseeker Chart.)	58	RIAA: 2× Platinum; BPI: Silver; RMNZ: Gold	Death Race for Love
"All Night" (with BTS)	2019	— (Note: "All Night" did not enter the Billboard Hot 100, but peaked at number 18 on the Billboard Bubbling Under Hot 100 chart.)	— (Note: "All Night" did not enter the Billboard Hot R&B/Hip-Hop Songs chart, but peaked at number one on the Billboard Bubbling Under R&B/Hip-Hop Singles chart.)	—	—	—	—	—	— (Note: "All Night" did not enter the NZ Top 40 Singles Chart, but peaked at number 17 on the NZ Hot Singles Chart.)	—	—		BTS World: Original Soundtrack
"Hate Me" (with Ellie Goulding)	2019	56	—	68	51	33	—	70	—	76	33	RIAA: 2× Platinum; ARIA: Platinum; BPI: Platinum; BVMI: Gold; IFPI DEN: Gold; MC: Platinum; RMNZ: 2× Platinum	Brightest Blue
"Run"	2019	—	—	—	—	—	—	—	—	—	—		Non-album single
"Ransom (Remix)" (with Lil Tecca)	2019	—	—	—	—	—	—	—	— (Note: "Ransom (Remix)" did not enter the NZ Top 40 Singles Chart, but peaked at number eight on the NZ Hot Singles Chart.)	—	—		We Love You Tecca
"Graduation" (with Benny Blanco)	2019	— (Note: "Graduation" did not enter the Billboard Hot 100, but peaked at number eight on the Bubbling Under Hot 100 chart.)	—	—	—	90	—	—	— (Note: "Graduation" did not enter the NZ Top 40 Singles Chart, but peaked at number 12 on the NZ Hot Singles Chart.)	—	88	RIAA: Platinum; BPI: Silver; RMNZ: Gold	Friends Keep Secrets 2
"Bandit" (with YoungBoy Never Broke Again)	2019	10	5	45	70	11	—	—	40	57	42	RIAA: 6× Platinum; AFP: Platinum; ARIA: Platinum; BPI: Platinum; BVMI: Gold; IFPI DEN: Gold; ZPAV: Gold; RMNZ: 2× Platinum	Death Race for Love
"Let Me Know (I Wonder Why Freestyle)"	2019	78	34	—	—	73	—	—	— (Note: "Let Me Know (I Wonder Why Freestyle)" did not enter the NZ Top 40 Singles Chart, but peaked at number 14 on the NZ Hot Singles Chart.)	—	—	RIAA: Gold; BPI: Silver; RMNZ: Platinum	JuiceWrld 9 9 9
"No Me Ame" (with Rvssian and Anuel AA)	2020	—	—	—	—	—	—	—	—	—	—		Non-album single
"Righteous"	2020	11	8	15	26	9	32	48	14	31	26	RIAA: 2× Platinum; ARIA: Platinum; BPI: Gold; MC: Platinum; RMNZ: Platinum	Legends Never Die
"Tell Me U Luv Me" (with Trippie Redd)	2020	38	15	51	—	40	—	—	— (Note: "Tell Me U Luv Me" did not enter the NZ Top 40 Singles Chart, but peaked at number 2 on the NZ Hot Singles Chart.)	— (Note: While "Tell Me U Luv Me" did not enter the Swedish Singles Chart, it peaked at number six on the Swedish Heatseeker Chart.)	56	RIAA: Platinum; BPI: Silver; RMNZ: Gold	Legends Never Die
"Go" (with the Kid Laroi)	2020	52	22	23	—	40	—	—	32	—	43	RIAA: 3× Platinum; ARIA: Platinum; BPI: Gold; IFPI DEN: Gold; MC: 2× Platinum; RMNZ: Platinum	F*ck Love
"Life's a Mess" (with Halsey) (Note: "Life's a Mess also appears on Halsey's EP Collabs)	2020	9	7	8	32	10	33	47	14	26	11	RIAA: Platinum; BPI: Silver; RMNZ: Platinum	Legends Never Die
"Come & Go" (with Marshmello)	2020	2	—	4	15	4	15	38	8	7	9	RIAA: 3× Platinum; ARIA: 2× Platinum; BPI: Platinum; BVMI: Gold; IFPI AUT: Gold; IFPI DEN: Gold; MC: 3× Platinum; RMNZ: 2× Platinum	Legends Never Die
"Wishing Well"	2020	5	4	14	36	8	32	88	13	27	15	RIAA: 2× Platinum; ARIA: Platinum; BPI: Platinum; BVMI: Gold; IFPI DEN: Gold; RMNZ: 2× Platinum	Legends Never Die
"Smile" (with the Weeknd)	2020	8	5	8	39	7	24	57	12	17	23	RIAA: Platinum; BPI: Silver; RMNZ: Platinum	Legends Never Die
"Real Shit" (with Benny Blanco)	2020	72	18	52	—	52	—	—	— (Note: "Real Shit" did not enter the NZ Top 40 Singles Chart, but peaked at number four on the NZ Hot Singles Chart.)	— (Note: "Real Shit" did not enter the Swedish Singellista Chart, but peaked at number one on the Swedish Heatseeker Chart.)	75		Friends Keep Secrets 2
"Reminds Me of You" (with the Kid Laroi)	2020	89	26	—	—	56	—	—	— (Note: "Reminds Me of You" did not enter the NZ Top 40 Singles Chart, but peaked at number five on the NZ Hot Singles Chart.)	— (Note: "Reminds Me of You" did not enter the Swedish Singellista Chart, but peaked at number ten on the Swedish Heatseeker Chart.)	63	BPI: Silver; RMNZ: Gold	Non-album singles
"Bad Boy" (with Young Thug)	2021	22	9	55	73	13	—	—	— (Note: "Bad Boy" did not enter the NZ Top 40 Singles Chart, but peaked at number three on the NZ Hot Singles Chart.)	— (Note: "Bad Boy" did not enter the Swedish Singellista Chart, but peaked at number one on the Swedish Heatseeker Chart.)	31	MC: Gold	Non-album singles
"Life's a Mess II" (with Clever and Post Malone)	2021	97	41	—	—	68	—	—	— (Note: "Life's a Mess II" did not enter the NZ Top 40 Singles Chart, but peaked at number 11 on the NZ Hot Singles Chart.)	—	—		Crazy
"Already Dead"	2021	20	6	29	24	14	37	21	30	44	25		Fighting Demons
"Wandered to LA" (with Justin Bieber)	2021	49	9	44	—	29	—	89	— (Note: "Wandered to LA" did not enter the NZ Top 40 Singles Chart, but peaked at number four on the NZ Hot Singles Chart.)	— (Note: "Wandered to LA" did not enter the Swedish Singellista Chart, but peaked at number three on the Swedish Heatseeker Chart.)	59		Fighting Demons
"Cigarettes"	2022	43	12	79	50	24	—	55	— (Note: "Cigarettes" did not enter the NZ Top 40 Singles Chart, but peaked at number three on the NZ Hot Singles Chart.)	87	37	BPI: Silver; RMNZ: Gold	Fighting Demons
"Bye Bye" (with Marshmello)	2022	53	23	67	56	36	—	46	— (Note: "Bye Bye" did not enter the NZ Top 40 Singles Chart, but peaked at number two on the NZ Hot Singles Chart.)	87	45	RIAA: Gold	Non-album single
"In My Head"	2022	23	6	78	63	45	—	58	— (Note: "In My Head" did not enter the NZ Top 40 Singles Chart, but peaked at number four on the NZ Hot Singles Chart.)	— (Note: "In My Head" did not enter the Swedish Singellista Chart, but peaked at number three on the Swedish Heatseeker Chart.)	40		Legends Never Die (5th Anniversary Edition)
"Face 2 Face"	2022	92	33	—	—	82	—	—	— (Note: "Face 2 Face" did not enter the NZ Top 40 Singles Chart, but peaked at number seven on the NZ Hot Singles Chart.)	—	98		Legends Never Die (5th Anniversary Edition)
"The Light"	2023	86	28	—	—	89	—	—	— (Note: "The Light" did not enter the NZ Top 40 Singles Chart, but peaked at number 12 on the NZ Hot Singles Chart.)	—	73		Non-album single
"Doomsday" (with Lyrical Lemonade and Cordae)	2023	58	19	—	—	49	—	—	— (Note: "Doomsday" did not enter the NZ Top 40 Singles Chart, but peaked at number three on the NZ Hot Singles Chart.)	—	92	RIAA: Gold	All Is Yellow
"Lace It" (with Eminem and Benny Blanco)	2023	85	21	—	—	55	—	—	— (Note: "Lace It" did not enter the NZ Top 40 Singles Chart, but peaked at number three on the NZ Hot Singles Chart.)	—	95		The Party Never Ends
"AGATS2 (Insecure)" (with Nicki Minaj)	2024	68	16	—	—	100	—	—	— (Note: "AGATS2 (Insecure)" did not enter the NZ Top 40 Singles Chart, but peaked at number 15 on the NZ Hot Singles Chart.)	—	89		The Party Never Ends
"Whoa (Mind in Awe)" (Remix) (with XXXTentacion)	2025	— (Note: "Whoa (Mind in Awe)" (remix) did not enter the Billboard Hot 100, but peaked at number 16 on the Billboard Bubbling Under Hot 100 chart.)	25	—	—	—	—	—	— (Note: "Whoa (Mind in Awe)" (Remix) did not enter the NZ Top 40 Singles Chart, but peaked at number 9 on the NZ Hot Singles Chart.)	—	—		Non-album singles
"The Way" (with XXXTentacion)	2025	—	—	—	—	—	—	—	— (Note: "The Way" did not enter the NZ Top 40 Singles Chart, but peaked at number 29 on the NZ Hot Singles Chart.)	—	—		Legends Never Die (5th Anniversary Edition)
"We Don't Get Along" (with Marshmello)	2026	— (Note: "We Don't Get Along" did not enter the Billboard Hot 100, but peaked at number 2 on the Billboard Bubbling Under Hot 100 chart.)	32	—	—	—	—	—	—	—	—		TBA
"—" denotes a recording that did not chart or was not released in that territory.

=== As featured artist ===
List of singles as featured artist, with selected chart positions, showing year released and album name
Title	Year	Peak chart positions										Certifications	Album
Title	Year	US	US R&B /HH	AUS	AUT	CAN	DEN	GER	NZ	SWE	UK	Certifications	Album
"Without Me (Remix)" (Halsey featuring Juice Wrld)	2019	—	—	—	—	—	—	—	—	—	—		Collabs and Manic
"Godzilla" (Eminem featuring Juice Wrld)	2020	3	3	3	6	3	4	16	2	7	1	RIAA: 3× Platinum; ARIA: 6× Platinum; BPI: 2× Platinum; BVMI: Platinum; IFPI AUT: Gold; IFPI DEN: Platinum; MC: 2× Platinum; RMNZ: 4× Platinum	Music to Be Murdered By
"Suicidal (Remix)" (YNW Melly featuring Juice Wrld)	2020	20	11	50	75	29	—	—	— (Note: "Suicidal (Remix)" did not enter the NZ Top 40 Singles Chart, but peaked at number 8 on the NZ Hot Singles Chart.)	71	37	RIAA: 4× Platinum; ARIA: Gold; BPI: Gold; IFPI DEN: Gold	Non-album single
"—" denotes a recording that did not chart or was not released in that territory.

=== Promotional singles ===
List of promotional singles, with selected chart positions, showing year released and album name
Title	Year	Peak chart positions									Certifications	Album
Title	Year	US	US R&B /HH	AUS	CAN	HUN	IRE	NZ Hot	POR	WW	Certifications	Album
"MoshPit" (Kodak Black featuring Juice Wrld)	2018	58	19	—	81	—	—	9	—	—	RIAA: Platinum	Dying to Live
"Girl of My Dreams" (with Suga)	2021	29	3	84	56	10	68	3	90	37		Fighting Demons
"—" denotes a recording that did not chart or was not released in that territory.

== Other charted and certified songs ==
List of other charted songs, with selected chart positions, showing year released and album name
Title	Year	Peak chart positions										Certifications	Album
Title	Year	US	US R&B /HH	AUS	CAN	IRE	NZ Hot	POR	SWE	SWI	UK	Certifications	Album
"Hurt Me" (Note: alternatively "Sticks & Stones".)	2017	—	—	—	—	—	—	—	—	—	—	RIAA: Platinum; BPI: Silver; MC: Platinum; RMNZ: Gold	JuiceWrld 9 9 9 and Goodbye & Good Riddance
"Black & White"	2018	— (Note: "Black & White" did not enter the Billboard Hot 100, but peaked at number 23 on the Billboard Bubbling Under Hot 100 chart.)	— (Note: "Black & White" did not enter the Billboard Hot R&B/Hip-Hop Songs chart, but peaked at number eight on the Billboard Bubbling Under R&B/Hip-Hop Singles chart.)	—	—	—	—	—	—	—	—	RIAA: 4× Platinum; BPI: Gold; MC: 3× Platinum; RMNZ: Platinum	Goodbye & Good Riddance
"I'll Be Fine"	2018	—	—	—	—	—	—	—	—	—	—	RIAA: Platinum; BPI: Silver; MC: Platinum; RMNZ: Gold	Goodbye & Good Riddance
"Used To"	2018	—	—	—	—	—	—	—	—	—	—	RIAA: Platinum; BPI: Silver; MC: Platinum; RMNZ: Gold	Goodbye & Good Riddance
"Candles"	2018	—	—	—	—	—	—	—	—	—	—	RIAA: 2× Platinum; BPI: Silver; MC: Platinum; RMNZ: Gold	Goodbye & Good Riddance
"Scared of Love"	2018	—	—	—	—	—	—	—	—	—	—	RIAA: Platinum; BPI: Silver; MC: Platinum; RMNZ: Gold	Goodbye & Good Riddance
"I'm Still"	2018	—	—	—	—	—	—	—	—	—	—	RIAA: Platinum; MC: Platinum; RMNZ: Gold	Goodbye & Good Riddance
"End of the Road"	2018	—	—	—	—	—	—	—	—	—	—	RIAA: Platinum; MC: Platinum	Goodbye & Good Riddance
"Long Gone"	2018	—	—	—	—	—	—	—	—	—	—	RIAA: Platinum; MC: Gold	Goodbye & Good Riddance
"No Bystanders" (Travis Scott featuring Juice Wrld and Sheck Wes)	2018	31	22	—	34	—	—	—	— (Note: "No Bystanders" did not enter the Swedish Singellista Chart, but peaked at number two on the Swedish Heatseeker Chart.)	—	—	RIAA: 2× Platinum; ARIA: Gold; MC: 2× Platinum	Astroworld
"Jet Lag" (with Future featuring Young Scooter)	2018	72	33	—	87	—	29	—	—	—	—	RIAA: Gold; MC: Gold	Wrld on Drugs
"Astronauts" (with Future)	2018	82	39	—	—	—	—	—	—	—	—	RIAA: Gold; MC: Gold	Wrld on Drugs
"Red Bentley" (with Future featuring Young Thug)	2018	— (Note: "Red Bentley" did not enter the Billboard Hot 100, but peaked at number one on the Billboard Bubbling Under Hot 100 chart.)	50	—	—	—	—	—	—	—	—		Wrld on Drugs
"Make It Back"	2018	92	47	—	—	—	—	—	—	—	—	MC: Gold	Wrld on Drugs
"7 AM Freestyle" (with Future)	2018	— (Note: "7 AM Freestyle" did not enter the Billboard Hot 100, but peaked at number eight on the Billboard Bubbling Under Hot 100 chart.)	— (Note: "7 AM Freestyle" did not enter the Billboard Hot R&B/Hip-Hop Songs chart, but peaked at number five on the Billboard Bubbling Under R&B/Hip-Hop Singles chart.)	—	—	—	—	—	—	—	—	RIAA: Gold	Wrld on Drugs
"Shorty" (with Future)	2018	— (Note: "Shorty" did not enter the Billboard Hot 100, but peaked at number 23 on the Billboard Bubbling Under Hot 100 chart.)	—	—	—	—	—	—	—	—	—		Wrld on Drugs
"Realer N Realer" (with Future)	2018	— (Note: "Realer N Realer" did not enter the Billboard Hot 100, but peaked at number two on the Billboard Bubbling Under Hot 100 chart.)	— (Note: "Realer N Realer" did not enter the Billboard Hot R&B/Hip-Hop Songs chart, but peaked at number one on the Billboard Bubbling Under R&B/Hip-Hop Singles chart.)	—	—	—	—	—	—	—	—	RIAA: Platinum; MC: Gold	Wrld on Drugs
"Wrld on Drugs" (with Future)	2018	— (Note: "Wrld on Drugs" did not enter the Billboard Hot 100, but peaked at number 22 on the Billboard Bubbling Under Hot 100 chart.)	—	—	—	—	—	—	—	—			Wrld on Drugs
"Hard Work Pays Off" (with Future)	2018	— (Note: "Hard Work Pays Off" did not enter the Billboard Hot 100, but peaked at number five on the Billboard Bubbling Under Hot 100 chart.)	— (Note: "Hard Work Pays Off" did not enter the Billboard Hot R&B/Hip-Hop Songs chart, but peaked at number three on the Billboard Bubbling Under R&B/Hip-Hop Singles chart.)	—	—	—	35	—	—	—	—	RIAA: Platinum; MC: Gold	Wrld on Drugs
"Yacht Club" (Lil Yachty featuring Juice Wrld)	2018	91	46	—	94	—	26	—	—	—	—	RIAA: Platinum; ARIA: Gold; RMNZ: Gold	Nuthin' 2 Prove
"1400 / 999 Freestyle" (Trippie Redd featuring Juice Wrld)	2018	55	24	—	76	—	7	—	—	—	—	RIAA: Platinum; BPI: Silver; MC: Platinum; RMNZ: Platinum	A Love Letter to You 3
"Nuketown" (Ski Mask the Slump God featuring Juice Wrld)	2018	63	32	—	81	—	10	—	—	—	—	RIAA: 2× Platinum; RMNZ: Platinum	Stokeley
"Hide" (featuring Seezyn)	2018	— (Note: "Hide" did not enter the Billboard Hot 100, but peaked at number 23 on the Billboard Bubbling Under Hot 100 chart.)	— (Note: "Hide" did not enter the Billboard Hot R&B/Hip-Hop Songs chart, but peaked at number five on the Billboard Bubbling Under R&B/Hip-Hop Singles chart.)	—	—	—	21	—	—	—	—	RIAA: 2× Platinum; BPI: Silver; RMNZ: Platinum	Spider-Man: Into the Spider-Verse
"Demons and Angels" (A Boogie wit da Hoodie featuring Juice Wrld)	2018	90	37	—	86	—	19	—	—	—	—	RIAA: Platinum; RMNZ: Gold	Hoodie SZN
"Empty"	2019	41	18	—	58	—	5	—	— (Note: "Empty" did not enter the Swedish Singellista Chart, but peaked at number 17 on the Swedish Heatseeker Chart.)	—	—	RIAA: 2× Platinum; BPI: Gold; RMNZ: Platinum	Death Race for Love
"Maze"	2019	65	32	—	85	—	9	—	—	—	—	RIAA: Platinum; RMNZ: Gold	Death Race for Love
"HeMotions"	2019	— (Note: "HeMotions" did not enter the Billboard Hot 100, but peaked at number three on the Billboard Bubbling Under Hot 100 chart.)	44	—	—	—	—	—	—	—	—	RIAA: Gold	Death Race for Love
"Demonz (Interlude)" (featuring Brent Faiyaz)	2019	— (Note: "Demonz (Interlude)" did not enter the Billboard Hot 100, but peaked at number 17 on the Billboard Bubbling Under Hot 100 chart.)	— (Note: "Demonz (Interlude)" did not enter the Billboard Hot 100, but peaked at number eight on the Billboard Bubbling Under R&B/Hip-Hop chart.)	—	—	—	—	—	—	—	—		Death Race for Love
"Fast"	2019	47	22	62	39	33	4	80	71	85	41	RIAA: Platinum; ARIA: Gold; BPI: Silver; RMNZ: Platinum	Death Race for Love
"Big"	2019	— (Note: "Big" did not enter the Billboard Hot 100, but peaked at number seven on the Billboard Bubbling Under Hot 100 chart.)	— (Note: "Big" did not enter the Billboard Hot 100, but peaked at number one on the Billboard Bubbling Under R&B/Hip-Hop chart.)	—	—	—	—	—	—	—	—		Death Race for Love
"Flaws and Sins"	2019	91	39	—	—	—	—	—	—	—	—	RIAA: Platinum; BPI: Silver; RMNZ: Gold	Death Race for Love
"Feeling"	2019	— (Note: "Feeling" did not enter the Billboard Hot 100, but peaked at number two on the Billboard Bubbling Under Hot 100 chart.)	43	—	—	—	—	—	—	—	—	RIAA: Platinum; BPI: Silver; RMNZ: Gold	Death Race for Love
"Syphilis"	2019	— (Note: "Syphilis" did not enter the Billboard Hot 100, but peaked at number 25 on the Billboard Bubbling Under Hot 100 chart.)	— (Note: "Syphilis" did not enter the Billboard Hot 100, but peaked at number nine on the Billboard Bubbling Under R&B/Hip-Hop chart.)	—	—	—	—	—	—	—	—		Death Race for Love
"Who Shot Cupid?"	2019	— (Note: "Who Shot Cupid?" did not enter the Billboard Hot 100, but peaked at number eight on the Billboard Bubbling Under Hot 100 chart.)	— (Note: "Who Shot Cupid?" did not enter the Billboard Hot 100, but peaked at number two on the Billboard Bubbling Under R&B/Hip-Hop chart.)	—	—	—	—	—	—	—	—	RIAA: Gold	Death Race for Love
"Ring Ring" (featuring Clever)	2019	— (Note: "Ring Ring" did not enter the Billboard Hot 100, but peaked at number five on the Billboard Bubbling Under Hot 100 chart.)	50	—	—	—	—	—	—	—	—	RIAA: Gold	Death Race for Love
"The Bees Knees"	2019	—	—	—	—	—	—	—	—	—	—	RIAA: Gold	Death Race for Love
"On God" (featuring Young Thug)	2019	— (Note: "On God" did not enter the Billboard Hot 100, but peaked at number 12 on the Billboard Bubbling Under Hot 100 chart.)	— (Note: "On God" did not enter the Billboard Hot 100, but peaked at number four on the Billboard Bubbling Under R&B/Hip-Hop chart.)	—	—	—	—	—	—	—	—	RIAA: Gold	Death Race for Love
"10 Feet"	2019	—	—	—	—	—	—	—	—	—	—	RIAA: Gold	Death Race for Love
"Rider"	2019	—	—	—	—	—	—	—	—	—	—	RIAA: Gold	Death Race for Love
"Make Believe"	2019	— (Note: "Make Believe" did not enter the Billboard Hot 100, but peaked at number one on the Billboard Bubbling Under Hot 100 chart.)	42	—	—	—	10	—	—	—	—	RIAA: Platinum; RMNZ: Gold	Death Race for Love
"Mannequin Challenge" (Young Thug featuring Juice Wrld)	2019	— (Note: "Mannequin Challenge" did not enter the Billboard Hot 100, but peaked at number nine on the Billboard Bubbling Under Hot 100 chart.)	— (Note: "Mannequin Challenge" did not enter the Billboard R&B/Hip-Hop Songs chart, but peaked at number one on the Billboard Bubbling Under R&B/Hip-Hop Songs chart.)	—	—	—	—	—	—	—	—		So Much Fun
"6 Kiss" (Trippie Redd featuring Juice Wrld and YNW Melly)	2019	60	28	—	64	97	15	—	—	—	—	RIAA: Gold; MC: Gold	A Love Letter to You 4
"PTSD" (G Herbo featuring Juice Wrld, Lil Uzi Vert, and Chance the Rapper)	2020	38	19	—	69	—	22	—	—	—	—	RIAA: Platinum; RMNZ: Gold	PTSD
"Flex" (Polo G featuring Juice Wrld)	2020	30	14	—	60	75	8	—	—	—	91	RIAA: 3× Platinum; BPI: Silver; MC: Platinum; RMNZ: Gold	The Goat
"Anxiety (Intro)"	2020	—	—	99	—	—	—	—	—	—	— (Note: "Anxiety (Intro)" did not enter the Uk Singles Chart, but peaked at number 92 on the Uk Streaming Top 100.)		Legends Never Die
"Conversations"	2020	7	6	19	13	—	4	62	44	53	— (Note: "Conversations" did not enter the Uk Singles Chart, but peaked at number 23 on the Uk Streaming Top 100.)	RIAA: Platinum; BPI: Silver; RMNZ: Gold	Legends Never Die
"Titanic"	2020	14	11	40	31	—	—	129	98	—	— (Note: "Titanic" did not enter the Uk Singles Chart, but peaked at number 36 on the Uk Streaming Top 100.)	RIAA: Gold	Legends Never Die
"Bad Energy"	2020	16	13	42	36	—	—	136	— (Note: "Bad Energy" did not enter the Swedish Singellista Chart, but peaked at number 2 on the Swedish Heatseeker Chart.)	—	— (Note: "Bad Energy" did not enter the Uk Singles Chart, but peaked at number 41 on the Uk Streaming Top 100.)	RIAA: Gold	Legends Never Die
"Blood on My Jeans"	2020	12	9	45	33	—	—	125	— (Note: "Blood on My Jeans" did not enter the Swedish Singellista Chart, but peaked at number 2 on the Swedish Heatseeker Chart.)	—	— (Note: "Blood on My Jeans" did not enter the Uk Singles Chart, but peaked at number 43 on the Uk Streaming Top 100.)	RIAA: Platinum; BPI: Silver; RMNZ: Gold	Legends Never Die
"Hate the Other Side" (with Marshmello featuring Polo G and the Kid Laroi)	2020	10	8	15	12	—	3	92	54	86	— (Note: "Hate the Other Side" did not enter the Uk Singles Chart, but peaked at number 25 on the Uk Streaming Top 100.)	RIAA: Platinum; BPI: Silver; RMNZ: Platinum	Legends Never Die
"I Want It"	2020	47	26	61	51	—	—	—	— (Note: "I Want It" did not enter the Swedish Singellista Chart, but peaked at number 16 on the Swedish Heatseeker Chart.)	—	— (Note: "I Want It" did not enter the Uk Singles Chart, but peaked at number 61 on the Uk Streaming Top 100.)	RIAA: Gold	Legends Never Die
"Fighting Demons"	2020	35	21	54	42	—	—	171	— (Note: "Fighting Demons" did not enter the Swedish Singellista Chart, but peaked at number 5 on the Swedish Heatseeker Chart.)	—	— (Note: "Fighting Demons" did not enter the Uk Singles Chart, but peaked at number 50 on the Uk Streaming Top 100.)	RIAA: Gold	Legends Never Die
"Screw Juice"	2020	46	25	67	52	—	—	195	—	—	— (Note: "Screw Juice" did not enter the Uk Singles Chart, but peaked at number 65 on the Uk Streaming Top 100.)	RIAA: Gold	Legends Never Die
"Up Up and Away"	2020	42	23	66	47	—	—	—	— (Note: "Up Up and Away" did not enter the Swedish Singellista Chart, but peaked at number 19 on the Swedish Heatseeker Chart.)	—	— (Note: "Up Up and Away" did not enter the Uk Singles Chart, but peaked at number 62 on the Uk Streaming Top 100.)	RIAA: Gold	Legends Never Die
"Stay High"	2020	34	20	58	41	—	—	—	— (Note: "Stay High" did not enter the Swedish Singellista Chart, but peaked at number 10 on the Swedish Heatseeker Chart.)	—	— (Note: "Stay High" did not enter the Uk Singles Chart, but peaked at number 53 on the Uk Streaming Top 100.)	RIAA: Platinum; BPI: Silver; RMNZ: Gold	Legends Never Die
"Can't Die"	2020	50	28	71	54	—	—	—	— (Note: "Can't Die" did not enter the Swedish Singellista Chart, but peaked at number 17 on the Swedish Heatseeker Chart.)	—	— (Note: "Can't Die" did not enter the Uk Singles Chart, but peaked at number 73 on the Uk Streaming Top 100.)	RIAA: Gold	Legends Never Die
"Man of the Year"	2020	51	—	69	53	—	—	—	—	—	— (Note: "Man of the Year" did not enter the Uk Singles Chart, but peaked at number 64 on the Uk Streaming Top 100.)	RIAA: Gold; RMNZ: Gold	Legends Never Die
"Blastoff" (Internet Money featuring Juice Wrld and Trippie Redd)	2020	79	26	—	63	58	5	190	— (Note: "Blastoff" did not enter the Swedish Singellista Chart, but peaked at number 14 on the Swedish Heatseeker Chart.)	—	90	MC: Platinum; RMNZ: Gold	B4 the Storm
"Buck 50" (with DJ Scheme)	2021	—	—	—	—	—	21	—	—	—	—		Family (Deluxe)
"734"	2021	— (Note: "734" did not enter the Billboard Hot 100, but peaked at number two on the Billboard Bubbling Under Hot 100 chart.)	36	—	76	—	6	—	—	—	—	MC: Gold	Goodbye & Good Riddance
"Lucid Dreams" (Remix) (featuring Lil Uzi Vert)	2021	—	—	—	—	—	8	—	—	—	—	RMNZ: 6× Platinum	Goodbye & Good Riddance
"Antisocial" (Migos featuring Juice Wrld)	2021	— (Note: "Antisocial" did not enter the Billboard Hot 100, but peaked at number six on the Billboard Bubbling Under Hot 100 chart.)	—	—	—	—	—	—	—	—	—		Culture III
"Matt Hardy 999" (with Trippie Redd)	2021	49	14	—	54	68	12	—	—	—	—	RIAA: Gold	Trip at Knight
"Rich Nigga Shit" (with Young Thug)	2021	78	29	—	98	—	24	—	—	—	—		Punk
"Burn"	2021	34	6	69	29	55	2	117	—	100	55		Fighting Demons
"You Wouldn't Understand"	2021	64	17	—	64	—	—	—	—	—	—		Fighting Demons
"Rockstar in His Prime"	2021	63	16	—	60	—	6	—	—	—	—		Fighting Demons
"Doom"	2021	75	23	—	70	—	—	—	—	—	—		Fighting Demons
"Go Hard"	2021	76	24	—	74	—	—	—	—	—	—		Fighting Demons
"Not Enough"	2021	80	26	—	72	—	—	—	—	—	—		Fighting Demons
"Feline" (with Polo G and Trippie Redd)	2021	56	13	86	54	—	4	—	—	—	—		Fighting Demons
"Relocate"	2021	87	29	—	85	—	—	—	—	—	—		Fighting Demons
"Juice Wrld Speaks 2"	2021	— (Note: "Juice Wrld Speaks 2" did not enter the Billboard Hot 100, but peaked at number 24 on the Billboard Bubbling Under Hot 100 chart.)	—	—	—	—	—	—	—	—	—		Fighting Demons
"Until the Plug Comes Back Around"	2021	— (Note: "Until the Plug Comes Back Around" did not enter the Billboard Hot 100, but peaked at number one on the Billboard Bubbling Under Hot 100 chart.)	37	—	97	—	—	—	—	—	—		Fighting Demons
"From My Window"	2021	86	28	—	82	—	—	—	—	—	—		Fighting Demons
"Feel Alone"	2021	98	35	—	98	—	—	—	—	—	—		Fighting Demons
"My Life in a Nutshell"	2021	— (Note: "My Life in a Nutshell" did not enter the Billboard Hot 100, but peaked at number nine on the Billboard Bubbling Under Hot 100 chart.)	48	—	—	—	—	—	—	—	—		Fighting Demons
"Sometimes"	2022	57	15	—	59	96	5	—	—	—	—		Fighting Demons
"Juice Wrld Did" (DJ Khaled featuring Juice Wrld)	2022	55	16	—	56	—	11	—	—	—	—		God Did
"Knight Crawler" (with Trippie Redd)	2023	52	19	—	61	—	8	—	—	—	—		Mansion Musik
"No Good" (with Rvssian)	2023	— (Note: "No Good" did not enter the Billboard Hot 100, but peaked at number 22 on the Billboard Bubbling Under Hot 100 chart.)	40	—	—	—	—	—	—	—	—		Goodbye & Good Riddance (5th Anniversary Edition)
"Cross the Globe" (Lil Durk featuring Juice Wrld)	2023	68	23	—	97	—	18	—	—	—	—		Almost Healed
"World Tour (Aquafina)"	2024	— (Note: "World Tour (Aquafina)" did not enter the Billboard Hot 100, but peaked at number four on the Billboard Bubbling Under Hot 100 chart.)	29	—	—	—	24	—	—	—	—		The Pre-Party
"Lightyears" (with Young Thug)	2024	— (Note: "Lightyears" did not enter the Billboard Hot 100, but peaked at number 25 on the Billboard Bubbling Under Hot 100 chart.)	37	—	—	—	19	—	—	—	—		The Pre-Party
"Both Ways"	2024	— (Note: "Both Ways" did not enter the Billboard Hot 100, but peaked at number 25 on the Billboard Bubbling Under Hot 100 chart.)	50	—	—	—	—	—	—	—	—		The Pre-Party
"Cavalier"	2024	—	—	—	—	—	38	—	—	—	—		The Pre-Party
"The Party Never Ends"	2024	80	25	—	92	—	6	—	—	—	—		The Party Never Ends
"Misfit"	2024	65	17	—	64	—	5	—	—	—	87		The Party Never Ends
"Cuffed"	2024	95	30	—	—	—	—	—	—	—	—		The Party Never Ends
"KTM Drip"	2024	91	28	—	—	—	—	—	—	—	—		The Party Never Ends
"Love Letter"	2024	— (Note: "Love Letter" did not enter the Billboard Hot 100, but peaked at number five on the Billboard Bubbling Under Hot 100 chart.)	35	—	—	—	—	—	—	—	—		The Party Never Ends
"Condone It"	2024	— (Note: "Condone It" did not enter the Billboard Hot 100, but peaked at number four on the Billboard Bubbling Under Hot 100 chart.)	34	—	—	—	—	—	—	—	—		The Party Never Ends
"Party by Myself"	2024	— (Note: "Party by Myself" did not enter the Billboard Hot 100, but peaked at number one on the Billboard Bubbling Under Hot 100 chart.)	—	—	—	—	—	—	—	—	—		The Party Never Ends
"Adore You"	2024	— (Note: "Adore You" did not enter the Billboard Hot 100, but peaked at number six on the Billboard Bubbling Under Hot 100 chart.)	—	—	—	—	—	—	—	—	—		The Party Never Ends
"Celebrate" (with Offset)	2024	— (Note: "Celebrate" did not enter the Billboard Hot 100, but peaked at number two on the Billboard Bubbling Under Hot 100 chart.)	31	—	—	—	—	—	—	—	—		The Party Never Ends
"Jeffrey"	2024	— (Note: "Jeffrey" did not enter the Billboard Hot 100, but peaked at number 11 on the Billboard Bubbling Under Hot 100 chart.)	46	—	—	—	—	—	—	—	—		The Party Never Ends
"Barbarian"	2024	— (Note: "Barbarian" did not enter the Billboard Hot 100, but peaked at number eight on the Billboard Bubbling Under Hot 100 chart.)	39	—	—	—	—	—	—	—	—		The Party Never Ends
"Best Friend" (with Fall Out Boy)	2024	— (Note: "Best Friend" did not enter the Billboard Hot 100, but peaked at number nine on the Billboard Bubbling Under Hot 100 chart.)	42	—	—	—	—	—	—	—	—		The Party Never Ends
"Floor It"	2024	— (Note: "Floor It" did not enter the Billboard Hot 100, but peaked at number 15 on the Billboard Bubbling Under Hot 100 chart.)	48	—	—	—	—	—	—	—	—		The Party Never Ends
"Oxycodone"	2024	— (Note: "Oxycodone" did not enter the Billboard Hot 100, but peaked at number 21 on the Billboard Bubbling Under Hot 100 chart.)	—	—	—	—	—	—	—	—	—		The Party Never Ends
"Spend It"	2024	— (Note: "Spend It" did not enter the Billboard Hot 100, but peaked at number 18 on the Billboard Bubbling Under Hot 100 chart.)	—	—	—	—	—	—	—	—	—		The Party Never Ends
"Empty Out Your Pockets"	2024	56	11	—	52	—	3	—	—	—	55		The Party Never Ends
"—" denotes a recording that did not chart or was not released in that territory.

== Guest appearances ==
List of non-single guest appearances, showing other artist(s), year released and album name
Title	Year	Other artist(s)	Album
"Round"	2018	Yung Bans	Yung Bans Vol. 5
"Honestly"	2018	G Herbo, Southside	Swervo
"No Bystanders"	2018	Travis Scott, Sheck Wes	Astroworld
"Yacht Club"	2018	Lil Yachty	Nuthin' 2 Prove
"1400 / 999 Freestyle"	2018	Trippie Redd	A Love Letter to You 3
"Don't Talk to Me (Remix)" (Note: Only available on YouTube and SoundCloud.)	2018	Lil Durk, Gunna	Signed to the Streets 3
"Nuketown"	2018	Ski Mask the Slump God	Stokeley
"Hide"	2018	Seezyn	Spider-Man: Into the Spider-Verse
"Demons and Angels"	2018	A Boogie wit da Hoodie	Hoodie SZN
"Never Scared"	2019	G Herbo, Southside	Still Swervin
"Mannequin Challenge"	2019	Young Thug	So Much Fun
"6 Kiss"	2019	Trippie Redd, YNW Melly	A Love Letter to You 4
"PTSD"	2020	G Herbo, Lil Uzi Vert, Chance the Rapper	PTSD
"Flex"	2020	Polo G	The Goat
"Blastoff"	2020	Internet Money, Trippie Redd	B4 the Storm
"Buck 50"	2021	DJ Scheme	Family (Deluxe)
"Antisocial"	2021	Migos	Culture III
"Can't Leave You Alone"	2021	Maroon 5	Jordi
"Matt Hardy 999"	2021	Trippie Redd	Trip at Knight
"Rich Nigga Shit"	2021	Young Thug	Punk
"Juice Wrld Did"	2022	DJ Khaled	God Did
"Knight Crawler"	2023	Trippie Redd	Mansion Musik
"Cross the Globe"	2023	Lil Durk	Almost Healed
"Money"	2023	Young Thug, Nicki Minaj	Business is Business (Metro's Version)
"Wake Up!"	2024	Ski Mask the Slump God	11th Dimension
"Arctic Tundra"	2024	Nicki Minaj	The Pinkprint (Tenth Anniversary Edition)

== Music videos ==
List of music videos, showing year released and directors
Title	Year	Other artist(s)	Director(s)	Ref.
As lead artist
"All Girls Are the Same"	2018	None	Cole Bennett	
"Lucid Dreams"	2018	None	Cole Bennett	
"Lean wit Me"	2018	None	Sherif Alabede	
"Black & White"	2018	None	R.J. Sanchez	
"No Issue"	2018	Future	Cole Bennett	
"Wrld on Drugs"	2018	Future	Spike Jordan	
"Realer N Realer"	2018	Future	Rick Nyce	
"Armed and Dangerous"	2018	None	Cole Bennett	
"Robbery"	2019	None	Cole Bennett	
"Hear Me Calling"	2019	None	Bradley and Pablo	
"Fast"	2019	None	Alexandre Moors	
"Hate Me"	2019	Ellie Goulding	Saam Farahmand	
"Hate Me" (Vertical video)	2019	Ellie Goulding	Unknown	
"Graduation"	2019	Benny Blanco	Jake Schreier	
"Graduation" (Vertical video)	2019	Benny Blanco	Unknown	
"Bandit"	2019	YoungBoy Never Broke Again	Cole Bennett	
"No Me Ame"	2020	Rvssian, Anuel AA	Arrad Rahgoshay	
"Righteous"	2020	None	Steve Cannon	
"Tell Me U Luv Me"	2020	Trippie Redd	Cole Bennett	
"Come & Go"	2020	Marshmello	Steve Cannon	
"Wishing Well"	2020	None	KDC Visions	
"Smile"	2020	The Weeknd	KDC Visions	
"Bad Boy"	2021	Young Thug	Cole Bennett	
"Conversations"	2021	None	Steve Cannon	
"Burn"	2021	None	Steve Cannon	
"Already Dead"	2022	None	Steve Cannon	
"Go Hard 2.0"	2022	None	Steve Cannon	
"Cigarettes"	2022	None	Steve Cannon	
"Bye Bye"	2022	Marshmello	Stripmall	
"In My Head"	2022	None	Unknown	
"Face 2 Face"	2022	None	Steve Cannon	
"Glo'd Up"	2023	None	Steve Cannon	
"World Tour (Aquafina)"	2024	None	Steve Cannon and Cnote	
"Both Ways"	2024	None	Trippie Redd and Dotcomnirvan	
"Misfit"	2024	None	Steve Cannon	
"The Party Never Ends"	2024	None	Steve Cannon	
"Empty Out Your Pockets"	2024	None	Unknown	
"Cuffed"	2024	None	Steve Cannon and Chris Long	
"Party By Myself"	2024	None	Steve Cannon and Alex Howard	
"Whoa (Mind in Awe) [Remix]"	2025	XXXTentacion	JMP	
"The Way"	2025	XXXTentacion	Steve Cannon and KDC Visions	
As featured artist
"Nuketown"	2019	Ski Mask the Slump God	Cole Bennett	
"Godzilla"	2020	Eminem	Cole Bennett	
"Suicidal (Remix)"	2020	YNW Melly	Nathan R. Smith	
"Go"	2020	The Kid Laroi	Steve Cannon	
"Blastoff"	2021	Internet Money, Trippie Redd	KDC Visions	
"Matt Hardy 999"	2021	Trippie Redd	KDC Visions	
