= Yacht Club (disambiguation) =

A yacht club is a type of boating club related to the sport of yachting.

Yacht Club may also refer to:

- "Yacht Club" (song), by Lil Yachty
- Yacht Club Games, an American video game developer
- "The Yacht Club", a song by Owl City on the 2011 album All Things Bright and Beautiful

== See also ==
- Yot Club, an American singer-songwriter
- List of yacht clubs
