= Krzy Train =

2023 single by Trippie Redd and Travis Scott

Single by Trippie Redd and Travis Scott

from the album Mansion Musik
- Released: January 20, 2023
- Genre: Rap rock
- Length: 3:51
- Label: 1400 Entertainment; 10K Projects
- Songwriters: Michael White II; Jacques Bermon Webster II
- Producers: Bosley; dreamr; Bacon and Popcorn; Igor Mamet; HnrzHunter

"Krzy Train" is a song by American rappers Trippie Redd and Travis Scott. It was released on January 20, 2023 as the lead single from Trippie Redd's fourth studio album Mansion Musik (2023).

== Credits and personnel ==
- Trippie Redd – vocals, songwriting
- Travis Scott – vocals, songwriting
- Bosley – production, songwriting
- dreamr. – production, songwriting
- Bacon and Popcorn – production, songwriting
- HnrzHunter – production, songwriting
- Igor Mamet – mastering, mixing, recording, production

== Charts ==
Chart performance for "Krzy Train"
Chart (2022)	Peak position
New Zealand Hot Singles (RMNZ)	19
US Billboard Hot 100	90
US Hot R&B/Hip-Hop Songs (Billboard)	35
