= Who Want the Smoke? =

2018 single by Lil Yachty featuring Cardi B and Offset

Single by Lil Yachty featuring Cardi B and Offset

from the album Nuthin' 2 Prove
- Released: July 6, 2018
- Genre: Trap
- Length: 3:18
- Label: Capitol; Motown; Quality Control
- Songwriters: Miles McCollum; Belcalis Almanzar; Kiari Cephus; Brytavious Chambers
- Producer: Tay Keith

Lil Yachty singles chronology
"Pretender" (2018)	"Who Want the Smoke?" (2018)	"Go Krazy, Go Stupid Freestyle" (2019)

"Who Want the Smoke?" is a song by American rapper Lil Yachty featuring fellow American rappers Cardi B and Offset. Written alongside producer Tay Keith, it was released on July 6, 2018, as the only single from Yachty's third studio album Nuthin' 2 Prove. The track was certified gold by the Recording Industry Association of America (RIAA).

== Background and release ==
The track was teased on March 29, 2018, by Lil Yachty. It was speculated that BlocBoy JB had a verse on the song, but he turned out only supplying the adlibs on the track. Yachty announced the single the day before its release in the United States. The track was released on July 5, 2018, in select international markets, and was released in the US on July 6.

Yachty previously collaborated with Offset on the tracks "Mickey", "Baby Daddy", and more, with the first two being tracks on Yachty's second studio album Lil Boat 2.

== Production ==
The track was produced by Tay Keith. He did a video for HotNewHipHop breaking down the beat, which was released on July 20, 2018. Jackson Howard of Pitchfork called the instrumental "spooky and crisp".

== Composition and lyrics ==
The track runs at three minutes and eighteen seconds long, and features background vocals from BlocBoy JB. In the song, Cardi B declares herself "the king of New York", allegedly directed at fellow New York rapper 6ix9ine.

== Critical reception ==
The track received mixed-to-positive reviews. Jackson Howard of Pitchfork said that the track "isn’t so much a flop as it is a wasted opportunity for a lost-in-the-woods Yachty to prove himself again" and called his verse and chorus "monotone" and "uninspired". He stated it as "a far cry from the irreverent melodies and charm that made him a burgeoning SoundCloud sensation in 2016, and further proof that his recent switch toward being a hard-hitting rhymeslinger needs serious fine tuning". However, he stated that the song was "saved by the brought-in assistance". He also called Cardi B's verse "one of her most memorable guest appearances in months", and called BlocBoy JB's adlibs "great". Alex Robert Ross of Vice said that Cardi B and Offset "dominated proceedings" while Yachty "continues to misfire", and called him "the fifth-most important musician" on the track. C. Vernon Coleman II of XXL called the song a "banger" and "trap-infused slapper".

== Commercial performance ==
The track debuted and peaked at number nine on the Bubbling Under Hot 100 chart, and fell off the next week. It did not re-enter the charts following the release of Yachty's third studio album Nuthin' 2 Prove, which the track was featured on.

== Charts ==
Chart (2018)	Peak position
New Zealand Hot Singles (RMNZ)	22
US Bubbling Under Hot 100 Singles (Billboard)	9

== Certifications ==
Region	Certification	Certified units/sales
United States (RIAA)	Gold	500,000^{‡}
^{‡} Sales+streaming figures based on certification alone.
