= Fijimacintosh =

American rapper, singer, and songwriter (born 2001)

- Also known as: Lord Nocturnal; Baby Sextile; Heavenboyfiji; Young TV
- Born: Tyvion Harris; May 8, 2001 (age 25)
- Genres: Hip-hop; trap; SoundCloud rap; rage
- Occupations: Rapper; singer; songwriter; producer
- Years active: 2018–present
- Labels: Empire Distribution; Cyber Sound, LLC

Tyvion Broyles Harris (born May 8, 2001), professionally known as Fijimacintosh, is an American rapper from Canton, Ohio.

== Early life ==
Fiji grew up in Canton, Ohio. Then, Fiji, his mother, and two brothers moved to East Atlanta at the age of eight for Fiji to pursue his dream to be a professional artist. He is the cousin of Trippie Redd.

== Career ==
=== Early career ===
Fiji began making music as early as four years old. By 2009, he and his mother began to sell CDs in the streets of Atlanta and at the famous Lennox Mall under the moniker "Young TV", under which he would also perform at local radio events and festivals.

By 2015, Fiji began to make waves in Atlanta with his "Cyber Boyz" movement. In an interview with XXL magazine, Fiji claimed that his biggest influences include 50 Cent, Kid Cudi, Kanye West, Lil Wayne and Neil Young. Fiji also claimed how whenever he felt down, he would listen to Kid Cudi to get through his days in high school. He also claimed listening to Neil Young's music helped affect his music vibe, with Fiji claiming, "It's more like a chillax thing."

In 2016, he began gaining widespread attention after independently releasing singles and EPs onto SoundCloud. This allowed Fiji to join fellow rapper Lil Uzi Vert for a few date spots on his Luv Is Rage tour.

By end of 2017 into 2018, Fiji signed with Empire Distribution. His debut mixtape, titled Satellite Crash, had features from Robb Bank$, and also featured his breakthrough track, "Wintertime Nights".

=== 2019–present ===
In 2019, he released his second mixtape, Teenage Disillusionment, toured with Smooky Margielaa, and released music videos for tracks such as "Demon Slayer".

He released his third mixtape, Beastboy,, on December 25, 2020.

He then released a handful of singles and an EP titled Elements, with breakout records like “Blue Hair Dye” and “Living To Live”, produced by Bnyx.

Fiji returned as a guest rapper on his cousin Trippie Redd's album Mansion Musik, where he featured on "Hideout".

On August 25, 2023, Fiji released his fourth mixtape, titled Nocturnal. The album has 20 tracks, and includes features from notable names such as Trippie Redd, Lil Tracy, Lil B, and Dom Corleo, amongst others.

== Reception ==
Fiji has received praise and was co-signed by the late American rapper, PnB Rock.

== Discography ==
=== Studio albums ===
List of studio albums
| Title | Details |
|---|---|
| Nocturnal | Released: August 25, 2023; Label: CYBER SOUND, LLC; Format: Digital download, streaming |

=== Mixtapes ===
List of mixtapes
| Title | Details |
|---|---|
| Satellite Crash | Released: 2018; Label: EMPIRE; Format: Digital download, streaming |
| Beastboy | Released: 2020; Label: CYBER SOUND, LLC; Format: Digital download, streaming |

=== Extended plays ===
List of extended plays
| Title | Details |
|---|---|
| Blank Substance | Released: February 15, 2019; Label: Cybersound 777, Empire; Format: Digital download, streaming |
| Elements | Released: July 23, 2021; Label: CYBER SOUND, LLC; Format: Digital download, streaming |
| Je T'en Prie | Released: June 19, 2025; Label: CYBER SOUND, LLC; Format: Digital download, streaming |
| Toro | Released: May 8, 2025; Label: CYBER SOUND, LLC; Format: Digital download, streaming |
| Dirt | Released: September 19, 2025; Label: CYBER SOUND, LLC; Format: Digital download, streaming |
| Teenage Disillusionment | Released: January 18, 2019; Label: EMPIRE; Format: Digital download, streaming |
