= Nuthin' 2 Prove =

Studio album by Lil Yachty
- Released: October 19, 2018
- Studio: Hitway Recordings; Paramount; Raymond (Los Angeles); Means Street; Patchwerk; Quality Control (Atlanta)
- Genre: Hip hop; trap-pop
- Length: 47:37
- Label: Capitol; Motown; Quality Control
- Producer: 30 Roc; Chase the Money; Cubeatz; Digital Nas; Earl on the Beat; ISOBeats; Jake Goes Digital; Javar Rockamore; MitchGoneMad; Misogi; OZ; Tay Keith

Lil Yachty chronology
Lil Boat 2 (2018)	Nuthin' 2 Prove (2018)	Lil Boat 3 (2020)

Singles from Nuthin' 2 Prove
- 1. "Who Want the Smoke?" Released: July 6, 2018

Nuthin' 2 Prove is the third studio album by American rapper Lil Yachty. It was released on October 19, 2018, by Capitol Records, Motown and Quality Control Music. The album features guest appearances from Playboi Carti, Juice Wrld, Lil Baby, Young Nudy, Cardi B, Offset, Trippie Redd, Kevin Gates, and Gunna.

== Background ==
Lil Yachty revealed the cover art on October 11, 2018, to Billboard. He confirmed the release date and album name via his Twitter account in September.

== Promotion ==
"Who Want the Smoke?" featuring Cardi B and Offset, was released as the album's lead single on July 6, 2018. The song was produced by Tay Keith.

== Critical reception ==
Professional ratings
Aggregate scores
Source	Rating
Metacritic	52/100
Review scores
Source	Rating
AllMusic	2/5 stars
Exclaim!	3/10
Highsnobiety	3.0/5
HipHopDX	2.9/5
HotNewHipHop	64%
NME	3/5 stars
Pitchfork	6.1/10
XXL	3/5

Nuthin' 2 Prove was met with mixed reviews. At Metacritic, which assigns a normalized rating out of 100 to reviews from professional publications, the album received an average score of 52, based on eight reviews.

Trey Alston of Pitchfork gave a positive review, stating "When he bellows and trills, regardless of what's actually coming out of his mouth, the results are leagues better than when he tries to do his best rapper impression on songs". In a mixed review, XXL's Charles Holmes stated: "Nuthin' 2 Prove, like its 2018 predecessor, Lil Boat 2, largely sees Yachty spinning in place, warring with his past and grasping at a murky future." Sam Moore of NME said, "With a swelling back catalogue, it's becoming increasingly clear what does and doesn't work for Yachty's solo output: skippable braggadocious freestyles? No. Endearing and experimental takes on hip-hop that demonstrate his more individualistic approach to being a major rap artist? Yes please". Kenan Draughorne of HipHopDX said, "By Quality Control's standards, Nuthin' 2 Prove is a brisk listen-through as it clocks in at just over 45 minutes, but it certainly feels as bloated as recent projects from Migos and Quavo's solo album".

Andy Kellman of AllMusic saying "Only with "Who Want the Smoke?" does the first half rise above the preceding album, yet Yachty's the third wheel, eclipsed by verses from Cardi B and Offset. He's more at ease on the lightheaded "melodic" tracks of the latter half, back to goofy-vulgar observations, musical crib-mobile melodies, and occasional openhearted moments that sound natural rather than forced". In a negative review, Exclaim!'s Clayton Tomlinson stated: "Lil Yachty's Nuthin' 2 Prove serves more to show off the talents of the featured artists than anything else. None of the Atlanta artist we know and used to love is present on this joint."

== Track listing ==
Nuthin' 2 Prove track listing
No.	Title	Writer(s)	Producer(s)	Length
1.	"Gimmie My Respect"	Miles McCollum; Samuel Gloade; Derrick Hill; Sakata Oatis	30 Roc	1:48
2.	"Get Dripped" (featuring Playboi Carti)	McCollum; Jordan Carter; Earl Bynum; Brandon Mitchell	Earl on the Beat; MitchGoneMad	2:38
3.	"Riley from the Boondocks"	McCollum; Mitchell	MitchGoneMad	3:05
4.	"I'm the Mac"	McCollum; Nasir Pemberton	Digital Nas	2:11
5.	"Yacht Club" (featuring Juice Wrld)	McCollum; Jarad Higgins; Bynum	Earl on the Beat	2:46
6.	"SaintLaurentYSL" (featuring Lil Baby)	McCollum; Dominique Jones; Bynum; Kevin Gomringer; Tim Gomringer	Earl on the Beat; Cubeatz	2:48
7.	"We Outta Here!" (featuring Young Nudy)	McCollum; Quantavious Thomas; Chase Rose	Chase the Money	3:52
8.	"Who Want the Smoke?" (featuring Cardi B and Offset)	McCollum; Belcalis Almanzar; Kiari Cephus; Brytavious Chambers	Tay Keith	3:18
9.	"Worth It"	McCollum; Javar Rockamore; Gentuar Memishi	Rockamore	2:47
10.	"Everything Good, Everything Right"	McCollum; Zain Siddiqui	Misogi	2:58
11.	"Next Up"	McCollum; Bynum; Mitchell	Earl on the Beat; MitchGoneMad	3:17
12.	"Forever World" (featuring Trippie Redd)	McCollum; Michael White IV; Ozan Yildirim; Sean Combs; Carl Thompson; Faith Evans; Kervin Cotten	OZ	5:01
13.	"Nolia" (featuring Kevin Gates)	McCollum; Kevin Gilyard; Kevin Butcher	Jake Goes Digital	3:22
14.	"Fallin' in Luv" (featuring Gunna)	McCollum; Sergio Kitchens; Gloade	30 Roc	3:40
15.	"Stoney"	McCollum; Kyle Emordi	ISOBeats	4:02
Total length:				47:37

Notes

- "Who Want the Smoke?" features additional vocals from BlocBoy JB

Sample credits

- "Gimmie My Respect" contains elements from "Killa", performed by Kingpin Skinny Pimp, Lil Sko and Lil Gin.
- "Forever World" contains elements from "Soon as I Get Home", written by Sean Combs, Carl Thompson, Faith Evans and Kervin Cotten, performed by Faith Evans.

== Personnel ==
Credits adapted from the album's liner notes and Tidal.

- Thomas "Tillie" Mann – mixing (all tracks)
- Stephen "DotCom" Farrow – mixing assistant (tracks 1–7, 9–15)
- Colin Leonard – mastering (all tracks)
- Gentuar Memishi – engineering (track 1)

== Charts ==
Chart performance for Nuthin' 2 Prove
Chart (2018)	Peak position
Australian Albums (ARIA)	62
Belgian Albums (Ultratop Flanders)	83
Canadian Albums (Billboard)	17
Dutch Albums (Album Top 100)	64
Irish Albums (IRMA)	77
Norwegian Albums (VG-lista)	33
UK Albums (OCC)	81
US Billboard 200	12
US Top R&B/Hip-Hop Albums (Billboard)	9

== Release history ==
Release dates and formats for Nuthin' 2 Prove
Region	Date	Label(s)	Format(s)	Ref.
Various	October 19, 2018	Capitol; Motown; Quality Control	Digital download; streaming	
Various	November 9, 2018	Capitol; Motown; Quality Control	CD	
Various	February 22, 2019	Capitol; Motown; Quality Control	Vinyl	
