= The Light (Juice Wrld song) =

2023 single by Juice Wrld

Single by Juice Wrld
- Released: March 23, 2023
- Length: 2:52
- Label: Grade A; Interscope
- Songwriters: Aaron Gilfenbain; Filip Gezin; Jarad Higgins; Max Lord; Zachary Foster
- Producers: Gezin; Hurtboy AG; Foster; Max Lord

Juice Wrld singles chronology
"Face 2 Face" (2022)	"The Light" (2023)	"Doomsday" (2023)

"The Light" is a song by American rapper Juice Wrld. It was released on March 23, 2023, by Grade A Productions and Interscope Records as part of the soundtrack for the video game MLB The Show 23. The song was produced by Gezin, Hurtboy AG, Foster, and Max Lord.

== Background ==
"The Light" was first previewed by producer Gezin in June 2020, six months after Juice Wrld's death; the song was later leaked online by fans in August of that same year. In March 2023, screenshots of an early-access build of the video game MLB The Show 23 surfaced on the Internet and revealed that the track would be included on the game's soundtrack. An official release date for the song was then teased and subsequently announced by both Juice Wrld's estate and frequent collaborators on various social media platforms in the following days.

== Composition ==
Over an upbeat production laden with hand claps and a backing guitar loop, Juice Wrld sings about the ways in which his partner has helped him out of various dark places throughout their time together. In the song's chorus, Juice Wrld refers to her as "the light" in his life and acknowledges that even though his heart "was once cold as ice", he has been able to open himself up more ever since the start of their relationship.

Following the opening chorus, Juice Wrld delivers the track's first verse and delves into the idea that at times he's felt that he "owes the Devil for life"; however, he pushes back on this by saying that with "God on [his] side", he was sent protection in the form of his partner. Still, he admits that their relationship isn't always perfect and that the two sometimes "argue and fight", while also noting that any conflict is often short lived and will ultimately help them grow as people over time. In the second verse, Juice Wrld refers to his partner as a "lifeline" and an "influence", while also calling what they have "real love" and saying that he's "sorry for the people that don't get it". Before returning to the chorus, Juice Wrld closes by saying that "it's us forever, worse or better, no discussion".

== Charts ==
Chart performance for "The Light"
Chart (2023)	Peak position
Canada Hot 100 (Billboard)	89
Global 200 (Billboard)	182
Netherlands (Single Tip)	24
New Zealand Hot Singles (RMNZ)	12
UK Singles (OCC)	73
US Billboard Hot 100	86
US Hot R&B/Hip-Hop Songs (Billboard)	28
