= The Way (Juice Wrld and XXXTentacion song) =

2025 single by Juice Wrld and XXXTentacion

Single by Juice WRLD and XXXTentacion

from the album Legends Never Die (5 Year Anniversary Edition)
- Released: July 11, 2025
- Recorded: January 2018; June 21, 2018
- Studio: XXX Studio; Paramount Recording Studio, Santa Monica, Los Angeles, California
- Genre: Emo rap; folk-pop; ballad
- Length: 3:51
- Label: Grade A; Interscope
- Songwriters: Jarad Higgins; Jahseh Onfroy; John Cunningham; Robert Soukiasyan
- Producer: John Cunningham

Juice Wrld singles chronology
"Whoa (Mind in Awe) - Remix" (2025)	"The Way" (2025)	"We Don't Get Along" (2026)

XXXTentacion singles chronology
"Whoa (Mind in Awe) - Remix" (2025)	"The Way" (2025)	"Broly" (2025)

Music video
- "The Way" on YouTube

"The Way" is a single by American rappers Juice Wrld and XXXTentacion, included on the fifth-anniversary edition of Juice Wrld's posthumous third studio album, Legends Never Die released on July 11, 2025. It marks the second posthumous collaboration between the two artists, following Juice's remix of XXXTentacion's song "Whoa (Mind in Awe)", which was officially released less than two months prior this song.

== Background ==
In November 2021, Solomon Sobande, XXXTentacion's manager, revealed that a posthumous collaboration between XXXTentacion and Juice Wrld was in development.

The track was completed posthumously by the estates of both artists. On January 28, 2018, XXXTentacion shared a video on social media of himself jokingly performing the song's chorus with a Ugandan accent, which is believed to have been recorded in the studio in a more serious way around the same period. The title is a reference to the popular Ugandan Knuckles meme and its associated catchphrase, "Do you know da wae?".

Juice Wrld's vocals originate from his unreleased track "Traveling (Inner Peace)", recorded at Paramount Recording Studios in Santa Monica on June 21, 2018.

The song features an acoustic guitar-driven instrumental accompanied by subtle keyboard elements, creating a minimal and intimate atmosphere. Both artists reflect on themes of isolation, uncertainty, and emotional struggle, topics that frequently appeared in their previous work.

The animated music video was directed by Juice Wrld's longtime collaborator and photographer Steve Cannon and animated by frequent collaborator KDC Visions. It depicts animated versions of XXXTentacion and Juice Wrld embarking on an intergalactic journey and floating through space.

== Critical reception ==
"The Way" received generally positive coverage from music publications, which praised its emotional tone. Michael Saponara of Billboard described the track as a "poignant" addition to Legends Never Die, while Gabriel Bras Nevares of HotNewHipHop highlighted its acoustic, guitar-led production and introspective lyrics. Antonio Johri of Complex noted that the song combines XXXTentacion's unfinished vocals with Juice Wrld’s vocals from his unreleased track "Traveling (Inner Peace)", forming "a remarkably seamless duet." However some fans questioned the decision to posthumously merge vocals from separate songs, reigniting debate over the ethics of posthumous releases and their commercial motives.

== Personnel ==
Credits adapted from Apple Music.

- Juice Wrld – artist, songwriter
- XXXTentacion – artist, songwriter
- John Cunningham – songwriter, producer, engineer
- Robert Soukiasyan - songwriter, additional producer
- Jon Castelli - mixing engineer
- Dale Becker - mastering engineer

== Charts ==
Chart performance for "The Way"
Chart (2025)	Peak position
New Zealand Hot Singles (RMNZ)	29
