= Fighting Demons =

Studio album by Juice Wrld
- Released: December 10, 2021
- Recorded: 2018–2019; 2021
- Genres: Hip hop; emo rap
- Length: 55:45
- Labels: Grade A; Interscope
- Producers: Audio Jacc; Charlie Handsome; Danny Wolf; Dr. Luke; Gežin; Harv; Jaegen; Jay Craig; Josh J; KBeaZy; Kookoo; Louis Bell; Max Lord; Metro Boomin; Nick Mira; Nils; No Love for the Middle Child; PD; Rex Kudo; Sidepce; T-Minus; Take a Daytrip

Juice Wrld chronology
Legends Never Die (2020)	Fighting Demons (2021)	The Pre-Party (2024)

Singles from Fighting Demons
- 1. "Already Dead" Released: November 12, 2021; 2. "Wandered to LA" Released: December 3, 2021; 3. "Cigarettes" Released: February 2, 2022

Fighting Demons is the fourth studio album by American rapper Juice Wrld. It was posthumously released by Grade A Productions and Interscope Records on December 10, 2021. The album features guest appearances from Justin Bieber, Polo G, Trippie Redd, and Suga of BTS. It serves as a tie-in for an HBO-produced documentary titled Juice Wrld: Into the Abyss, released on December 16, 2021.

== Release and promotion ==
On November 11, 2021, Grade A Productions, in conjunction with Juice Wrld's mother, Carmela Wallace, announced the album with the release date of December 10, 2021. The album's lead single, "Already Dead", was released the following day, November 12, 2021, the song peaked at number 20 on the US Billboard Hot 100.

The second single, "Wandered to LA", a collaboration with Canadian singer Justin Bieber, was released on December 3, 2021, the song peaked at number 49 on the Billboard Hot 100.

On December 9, 2021, a tribute event titled Juice Wrld Day was held at Chicago's United Center. At the event, the album was played prior to its release as a listening party. A few special guests appeared to perform and pay respect to Juice, including Ski Mask the Slump God, Trippie Redd, 24kGoldn, and Lucki. Juice's former DJ Mike P hosted the event.

The song "Girl of My Dreams" with South Korean rapper Suga was released as a promotional single on the album's release date on December 10, 2021.

"Cigarettes" was released for digital download on February 2, 2022, as the album's third single. The song peaked at number 43 on the Billboard Hot 100. The complete edition of the album was released on the same day, alongside the newly released song "Go Hard 2.0".

The previously released singles from the two-track EP Too Soon.., "Rich and Blind" and "Legends", were later added to the album on March 18, 2022, alongside the newly released song "Sometimes".

== Critical reception ==
Professional ratings
Aggregate scores
Source	Rating
Metacritic	73/100
Review scores
Source	Rating
AllMusic	3.5/5 stars
Clash	5/10
HipHopDX	3.6/5
NME	4/5 stars
Pitchfork	6.5/10
RapReviews	7/10
Rolling Stone	3.5/5 stars

Fighting Demons was met with generally positive reviews. At Metacritic, which assigns a normalized rating out of 100 to reviews from professional publications, the album received an average score of 73, based on seven reviews.

A. D. Amorosi of Variety praised many of the guest artists on Fighting Demons, with Justin Bieber's verse on single "Wandered to LA" and Suga's verse on promotional single "Girl of My Dreams" being his two favourites. He mentioned that the album stands out over other post-mortem projects because, in comparison, there are "surprisingly (and happily) few features". Writing for NME, Kyann-Sian Williams gave the project a rating of 4/5 stars citing that Fighting Demons "shows the other side of Juice Wrld, which was never explored enough while he was alive" and that the project manages to deepen his narrative with a level of care rarely seen on posthumous releases. Reviewing the album for HipHopDX, Mackenzie Cummings-Grady stated, "Fighting Demons embodies Juice Wrld in that way: a flawed project with moments of brilliance that feels uncomfortable to listen to but isn't ashamed of its naked humanity. And in that aspect, it becomes a balancing act of the man and the artist, melding the two to create a project that's earnest and authentic – just like Juice Wrld".

Fred Thomas of AllMusic said, "Themes of struggling to overcome depression and drug dependency surface often on Fighting Demons, making it a heavier collection than the sometimes celebratory memoriam of Legends Never Die. It's not an essential piece of the Juice Wrld story, but it's also not without some solid reminders of his greatness". Rolling Stone critic Will Dukes said, "Fighting Demons, his second posthumous album is a tortured but overall grateful memento mori from a talented artist who left us all too soon". In a lukewarm review, Clash's Robin Murray wrote, "Ultimately Fighting Demons works almost as a tribute record, gathering fragments of his undoubted genius. Whether it's a true Juice Wrld album, though, is another matter".

== Commercial performance ==
Fighting Demons debuted at number two on the US Billboard 200 with 119,000 album-equivalent units (including 4,000 pure album sales) in its first week. The album also accumulated a total of 155.49 million on-demand streams of the set's tracks in the week ending December 25.

== Track listing ==
Fighting Demons track listing
No.	Title	Writer(s)	Producer(s)	Length
1.	"Burn"	Jarad Higgins; Joël Fajerman; Leland Wayne	Metro Boomin	3:37
2.	"Already Dead"	Higgins; Nicholas Mira; Dorien Theus	Nick Mira; Sidepce	3:51
3.	"You Wouldn't Understand"	Higgins; Filip Gežin; Nils Noehden; Max Lord; Nedim Melkić	Gežin; Nils; Lord	2:50
4.	"Wandered to LA" (with Justin Bieber)	Higgins; Justin Bieber; Louis Bell; Bernard Harvey; Omer Fedi	Bell; Harv	3:08
5.	"Eminem Speaks"	Marshall Mathers; Higgins		2:13
6.	"Rockstar in His Prime"	Higgins; Tyler Williams	T-Minus	3:00
7.	"Doom"	Higgins; David Biral; Denzel Baptiste; Blake Slatkin	Take a Daytrip	3:37
8.	"Go Hard"	Higgins; Keegan Bach	KBeaZy	2:14
9.	"Juice Wrld Speaks"	Higgins		1:29
10.	"Not Enough"	Higgins; Bach; Lukasz Gottwald; Justin Craig; Pierre DeJournette; Christopher Barnett	KBeaZy; Dr. Luke; Jay Craig; PD	2:51
11.	"Feline" (with Polo G and Trippie Redd)	Higgins; Taurus Bartlett; Michael White II; Mira; Theus	Mira; Sidepce	3:32
12.	"Relocate"	Higgins; Mira	Mira	3:28
13.	"Juice Wrld Speaks 2"	Higgins; Masamune Kudo	Rex Kudo	3:10
14.	"Until the Plug Comes Back Around"	Higgins; Gežin; Lord; Andrew Migliore; Jack Cohen-Mungan	Gežin; Lord; No Love for the Middle Child; Audio Jacc	2:53
15.	"From My Window"	Higgins; Mira; Ryan Vojtesak	Mira; Charlie Handsome	3:07
16.	"Girl of My Dreams" (with Suga of BTS)	Higgins; Min Yoon-gi; Lord; Jagvir Aujla; Joshua Jaramillo; Karim El-Ziftawi	Jaegen; Josh J; Kookoo; Lord	3:46
17.	"Feel Alone"	Higgins; Miguel Curtidor	Danny Wolf	3:50
18.	"My Life in a Nutshell"	Higgins; Mira	Mira	3:08
Total length:				55:45

Complete edition
No.	Title	Writer(s)	Producer(s)	Length
8.	"Go Hard 2.0"	Higgins; Mira	KBeaZy	3:35
Total length:				59:20

Extended edition
No.	Title	Writer(s)	Producer(s)	Length
3.	"Cigarettes"	Higgins; Mira	Mira	3:47
Total length:				63:07

Digital deluxe edition
No.	Title	Writer(s)	Producer(s)	Length
5.	"Sometimes"	Higgins; Curtidor; Subhaan Rahman; Othello Houston	Danny Wolf; Haan; Otxhello	4:20
22.	"Rich and Blind"	Higgins; Biral; Baptiste; Russell Chell	Take a Daytrip; Chell	3:09
23.	"Legends"	Higgins; Biral; Baptiste; Russell Chell	Take a Daytrip; Chell	3:12
Total length:				74:15

== Personnel ==
- Juice Wrld – lead vocals
- Emerson Mancini – mastering (1, 4–9, 11–18)
- Colin Leonard – mastering (2, 3)
- Dale Becker – mastering (10)
- Ethan Stevens – mixing (1)
- Manny Marroquin – mixing (2, 4, 5, 7, 9, 11–13, 15–18)
- Max Lord – mixing (3, 6, 8, 14), recording (1, 7, 8, 11, 12, 14–18)
- Serban – mixing (10)
- Joey Galvan – recording (2)
- Louis Bell – recording (4), vocal editing (4), vocal production (4)
- Austin Patton – recording (5, 9)
- Patrick Ehrenblad-Plummer – recording (6)
- Fili Filizzola – recording (10)
- Logan Haynes – recording (13)
- Viko Marley – recording arrangement (11)
- Chris Galland – mastering assistance (1), mixing assistance (2)
- Robin Florent – mastering assistance (1), mixing assistance (2)
- Zach Pereyra – mastering assistance (1), mixing assistance (2, 4, 5, 7, 9, 11–13, 15–18)
- Anthony Vilchis – mixing assistance (4, 5, 7, 9, 11–13, 15–18)
- Evan Jordan – recording assistance (16)
- James Kang – recording assistance (16)
- Carmella Wallace – additional vocals (12)

== Charts ==
=== Weekly charts ===
Weekly chart performance for Fighting Demons
Chart (2021–2022)	Peak position
Australian Albums (ARIA)	7
Austrian Albums (Ö3 Austria)	12
Belgian Albums (Ultratop Flanders)	10
Belgian Albums (Ultratop Wallonia)	83
Canadian Albums (Billboard)	3
Danish Albums (Hitlisten)	6
Dutch Albums (Album Top 100)	5
Finnish Albums (Suomen virallinen lista)	10
French Albums (SNEP)	102
German Albums (Offizielle Top 100)	12
Irish Albums (Official Charts)	12
Italian Albums (FIMI)	51
Lithuanian Albums (AGATA)	5
New Zealand Albums (RMNZ)	4
Norwegian Albums (VG-lista)	5
Scottish Albums (Official Charts)	77
Spanish Albums (Promusicae)	96
Swedish Albums (Sverigetopplistan)	13
Swiss Albums (Schweizer Hitparade)	12
UK Albums (Official Charts)	8
UK R&B Albums (Official Charts)	22
US Billboard 200	2
US Top R&B/Hip-Hop Albums (Billboard)	1

=== Year-end charts ===
2022 year-end chart performance for Fighting Demons
Chart (2022)	Position
Belgian Albums (Ultratop Flanders)	117
US Billboard 200	24
US Top R&B/Hip-Hop Albums (Billboard)	16

== Certifications ==
Certifications for Fighting Demons
Region	Certification	Certified units/sales
Denmark (IFPI Danmark)	Gold	10,000^{‡}
New Zealand (RMNZ)	Gold	7,500^{‡}
Poland (ZPAV)	Gold	10,000^{‡}
United Kingdom (BPI)	Gold	100,000^{‡}
^{‡} Sales+streaming figures based on certification alone.

== Release history ==
Release dates and formats for Fighting Demons
Region	Date	Label(s)	Format(s)	Edition	Ref.
Various	December 10, 2021	Grade A; Interscope	Digital download; streaming	Standard	
Various	March 18, 2022	Grade A; Interscope	CD; vinyl; cassette	Standard	
