= In My Head (Juice Wrld song) =

2022 single by Juice Wrld

Single by Juice Wrld

from the album Legends Never Die (5th Anniversary Edition)
- Released: October 28, 2022
- Length: 3:12
- Label: Grade A; Interscope
- Songwriters: Jarad Higgins; Jeff Lacroix; Max Lord; Sheldon Ferguson
- Producers: Tre Pounds; Max Lord; Sheldon Ferguson

Juice Wrld singles chronology
"Bye Bye" (2022)	"In My Head" (2022)	"Face 2 Face" (2022)

Music video
- "In My Head" on YouTube

"In My Head" is a posthumous song by American rapper Juice Wrld. It was released as a single on October 28, 2022, by Grade A Productions and Interscope Records. The song was produced by Tre Pounds, Max Lord, and Sheldon Ferguson, and was teased prior to its release under the title "Rush Hour." The song was later added to Juice Wrld's third studio album, Legends Never Die, as part of the 5th Anniverary Edition.

== Background ==
"In My Head" was first previewed by Juice Wrld on August 30, 2019, and would remain unreleased for nearly three years after his death. On October 22, 2022, Lil Bibby, owner of Grade A Productions, began teasing the track's release under the title "Rush Hour"; on October 24, a 30-second snippet of the song was uploaded to streaming services. Lil Bibby would later reveal the track's official title in a post to Instagram, while also revealing that the title "Rush Hour" was used as a "code name ... to prevent hackers from leaking the song early".

== Composition ==
Over a guitar-heavy, trap-infused production Juice Wrld sings about his struggles with substance abuse and the various mental health issues he deals with on a day-to-day basis. The song's chorus consists of Juice Wrld singing that he gets "stuck" in his head "trying to see where [he] fell from", or alternately that he "get[s] high as fuck" because he's "trapped" in his head. Throughout the song, Juice Wrld also sings that his constant use of substances "don't work" and "it's gon' hurt"; still, he manages to express hope that something will change and that in the end, everything will "all [work] out".

== Music video ==
The official music video was directed by Steve Cannon and Chris Long and released on October 28, 2022. The video makes use of archival footage of Juice Wrld that depicts him recording music and touring at various points throughout his career; the video also features brief animated sequences of human lungs and a brain to visually depict various lyrics found throughout the song.

== Charts ==
Chart performance for "In My Head"
Chart (2022)	Peak position
Australia (ARIA)	78
Austria (Ö3 Austria Top 40)	63
Canada Hot 100 (Billboard)	45
Germany (GfK)	58
Global 200 (Billboard)	55
Ireland (IRMA)	49
Netherlands (Single Tip)	1
New Zealand Hot Singles (RMNZ)	4
Sweden Heatseeker (Sverigetopplistan)	3
Switzerland (Schweizer Hitparade)	92
UK Singles (OCC)	40
UK Hip Hop/R&B (OCC)	14
US Billboard Hot 100	23
US Hot R&B/Hip-Hop Songs (Billboard)	6
