= Already Dead (song) =

Single by Juice Wrld

from the album Fighting Demons
- Released: November 12, 2021
- Recorded: March 20, 2018
- Genre: Emo rap
- Length: 3:51
- Label: Grade A; Interscope
- Songwriters: Jarad Higgins; Nicholas Mira; Dorien Theus
- Producers: Nick Mira; DT

Juice Wrld singles chronology
"Life's a Mess II" (2021)	"Already Dead" (2021)	"Wandered to LA" (2021)

Music Video
- "Already Dead" on YouTube

Visualizer
- "Already Dead (Visualizer)" on YouTube

"Already Dead" is a song by American rapper Juice Wrld. It was released via Grade A Productions through exclusive licensing to Interscope Records as the lead single from his fourth studio album, Fighting Demons, on November 12, 2021. Juice Wrld wrote the song with producers Nick Mira and DT.

== Background ==
On March 1, 2018, Juice Wrld tweeted "I've been dead for years", which was the first reference to the song. The song was recorded on March 20, 2018, with the beat having been made 2 days prior on March 18, 2018. The song was soon accompanied with two snippets that Juice previewed. Two years later, on December 9, 2020, Juice WRLD's manager Lil Bibby would tweet out to confirm he was looking for the song. 8 months later, in July 2021, other manager Peter Jideonwo would confirm that Bibby has found the song. Three months later, on October 26, 2021, Lil Bibby tweeted that the song would be released on November 12, 2021. The song would go on to leak 3 hours later along with the entire studio session from the night Juice recorded the song. The music video and visualizer was heavily inspired by the anime and manga series, Demon Slayer: Kimetsu no Yaiba.

== Composition ==
On the track, Juice Wrld talks about overcoming mental health struggles, over a minor-key piano melody. The song was produced by Nick Mira and DT, producers who have worked with Juice several times in the past.

== Personnel ==
Credits adapted from Spotify.

- Jarad Higgins – vocals, composition
- Nick Mira – writer, producer
- Dorian "DT" Theus – writer, producer

== Charts ==
=== Weekly charts ===
Weekly chart performance for "Already Dead"
Chart (2021–2022)	Peak position
Australia (ARIA)	29
Australia Hip Hop/R&B (ARIA)	7
Austria (Ö3 Austria Top 40)	24
Canada Hot 100 (Billboard)	14
Czech Republic Singles Digital (ČNS IFPI)	50
Denmark (Tracklisten)	37
Germany (GfK)	21
Global 200 (Billboard)	17
Greece (IFPI)	49
Ireland (IRMA)	23
Lithuania (AGATA)	38
Netherlands (Single Top 100)	46
New Zealand (Recorded Music NZ)	30
Norway (VG-lista)	38
Portugal (AFP)	59
Slovakia (Singles Digitál Top 100)	37
South Africa (RISA)	34
Sweden (Sverigetopplistan)	44
Switzerland (Schweizer Hitparade)	26
UK Singles (OCC)	25
UK Hip Hop/R&B (OCC)	5
US Billboard Hot 100	20
US Hot R&B/Hip-Hop Songs (Billboard)	6

=== Year-end charts ===
2022 year-end chart performance for "Already Dead"
Chart (2022)	Position
US Hot R&B/Hip-Hop Songs (Billboard)	81
