= Cross the Globe =

2023 song by Lil Durk featuring Juice Wrld

Song by Lil Durk featuring Juice Wrld

from the album Almost Healed
- Released: May 26, 2023
- Recorded: 2019
- Length: 2:04
- Label: Only the Family; Alamo; Sony
- Songwriters: Durk Banks; Jarad Higgins; Wesley Glass; Ryan Vojtesak
- Producers: Wheezy; Charlie Handsome

"Cross the Globe" is a song by American rapper Lil Durk featuring Juice Wrld. It is taken from the former's eighth studio album Almost Healed (2023). The song was produced by Wheezy and Charlie Handsome.

== Composition ==
The song revolves around the themes of sex, drugs, and street violence. Its production contains guitar and the chorus is performed by Juice Wrld. Lil Durk reflects on the violence in his native city of Chicago, rappers who are deceased or imprisoned, the Internet trying to spread negativity and his community efforts of offering scholarships.

== Reception ==
Gabriel Bras Nevares of HotNewHipHop gave a favorable review, writing "the eerie guitar-led beat gives the track a melancholy feel to it, accentuated by their understated vocal deliveries. On Juice WRLD's end, he provides a fitting chorus that meshes well with Lil Durk's heartfelt verse. In fact, it might be a disservice to his lyrical themes on this track to call it a typical focus." Dylan Green of Pitchfork was critical of the song, writing, "'Cross the Globe' boasts a feature from the late Juice WRLD, and his somber and paranoid verse ('I got the juice, feel like 2Pac / They tryna kill me in the black Beamer like 2Pac') doesn't match Durk yelling about going deep into some young lady's guts while screaming 'Free Thug!' There's no humor or fun parallel here—it's a jarring distraction."

== Charts ==
Chart performance for "Cross the Globe"
Chart (2023)	Peak position
Canada Hot 100 (Billboard)	97
New Zealand Hot Singles (RMNZ)	18
US Billboard Hot 100	68
US Hot R&B/Hip-Hop Songs (Billboard)	23
