= Mansion Musik =

2023 studio album by Trippie Redd

Studio album by Trippie Redd
- Released: January 20, 2023
- Genres: Rage; trap; rap rock
- Length: 76:00
- Labels: 10K Projects; 1400 Entertainment
- Producers: Bacon and Popcorn (exec.) •: 1p$ilocybin; 4OUR; Ambezza; Bosley; BrentRambo; CBMIX; Chopsquad DJ; CuBeatz; dreamr.; Ellis Lost; Hitmula; Igor Mamet; Loesoe; malikai; Nadddot; PAX; Peter Jideonwo; Pi'erre Bourne; Redda; Rott; Seal; SJR Beats; star boy; T9C; UK24; Zodiac

Trippie Redd chronology
First Draft (2022)	Mansion Musik (2023)	A Love Letter to You 5 (2023)

Mansion Musik is the fifth studio album by American rapper Trippie Redd. It was released through 10K Projects and 1400 Entertainment on January 20, 2023. The album features guest appearances from Chief Keef, Future, Lil Baby, the late Juice Wrld, Travis Scott, Lil Durk, Nardo Wick, Big30, Lucki, Rich the Kid, Summrs, Fijimacintosh, Rylo Rodriguez, Ski Mask the Slump God, G Herbo, Rob49, DaBaby, Lil B, and Kodak Black. It was executive produced by Chief Keef and serves as the follow-up to Redd's previous album, Trip at Knight (2021).

One critic wrote that "Trippie Redd’s Mansion Musik came exactly as advertised — menacing, villainous and full of murderous anthems the emo-rap pioneer has been known for."

== Release and promotion ==
In early 2023, Redd announced the title of the album. On January 9, 2023, he revealed that Travis Scott would be featured on a song from it by posting a picture of a conversation with him that saw the two discussing details about their collaboration for the album. Exactly one week later, Redd teased snippets of the respective collaborations with both Travis Scott and Future. That same day, he revealed the tracklist of the album, in which he stated that he would announce its release date if his promotional post for it received 80,000 comments that said "#MM", its initials. On January 17, 2023, sources close to Redd revealed to news website TMZ that the album was set to be released three days later and Redd would let his fans know more details later that day.

== Critical reception ==
Professional ratings
Aggregate scores
Source	Rating
Metacritic	58/100
Review scores
Source	Rating
AllMusic	2.5/5 stars
HipHopDX	3.3/5
RapReviews	6/10
Rolling Stone	3.5/5 stars
Slant Magazine	1/5 stars
The Oxford Student	7.1/10

At its release, Mansion Musik received lukewarm reviews from critics. At Metacritic, which assigns a normalized rating out of 100 to reviews from mainstream publications, the album received an average score of 58, based on 5 reviews. Andre Gee of Rolling Stone opined: "Whether Trippie is exploring murky, minimalist beats, tapping into his inner Tom DeLonge, or fighting with the rambunctious synth-driven production that Mansion Musik is stocked with, one thing is for certain: His voice is going to soar. Trippie's vocal skills are his defining attribute, and they're exemplified to great effect on Mansion Musik." Although his review was mostly positive, Gee criticized the content of the tracks, saying that "As compelling as Trippie's vocals and production are, each track leaves the listener feeling like he could be doing more as a songwriter. There's a misconception that melody-driven artists don't prioritize bars, but that's not necessarily true." Scott Glaysher of HipHopDX wrote favorably of the songs but regarded the album as too long, writing: "The songs themselves are actually quite good in their own unique way but it's difficult for anyone to jump around a 25-track album and get the most out of it."

Steve Juon of RapReviews commented: "For an album with so many featured guest stars, it still feels incredibly lonely and isolated in Trippie Redd's world, and that's just depressing when I'm paying close attention. If you can enjoy the music in a vacuum without his lyrics affecting you like they do me, more power to you. Not all negative rap bothers me, but Trippie Redd's dour outlook isn't for me, no matter how much that winds up making me like Grandpa Simpson." Paul Attard of Slant Magazine gave a negative review, writing that the album is "repetitive, shoddily produced, and lacks any real structure" and "consistent in that regard." He added, "There's something to be said for the pure single-mindedness of an album such as this, which vehemently strikes the same numbing note over and over again. Yet, considering how hard it tries to conjure an atmosphere of wild danger, what's perhaps most disappointing about Mansion Musik is how predictable of an experience it ultimately amounts to."

In November 2026, a retrospective review of the project by Maximus Walker of The Oxford Student suggested that the album "has probably previously been reviewed too harshly", adding that its "ambition is undeniable, and it does go a long way". Like past reviews, however, Walker recognised the album's bloat, concluding by calling Mansion Musik "a captivating record whose tirelessness often overshadows its best ideas."

=== Year-end lists ===
Select year-end rankings for Mansion Musik
Publication	List	Rank	Ref.
XXL	The Best Hip-Hop Projects of 2023	–	

== Track listing ==
Mansion Musik track listing
No.	Title	Writer(s)	Producer(s)	Length
1.	"Mansion Musik"	Michael White II; Andreas Matura; Matt Bosley; Igor Mamet; Peter Jideonwo	Peter Jideonwo; Nadddot; Bosley	3:37
2.	"Atlantis" (with Chief Keef)	White; Keith Cozart; Sam Ritter; 1p$ilocybin	SJR; 1p$ilocybin	4:12
3.	"Psycho" (with Future)	White; Nayvadius Wilburn; Cas van der Heijden; Seal	Loesoe; Seal	4:38
4.	"Fully Loaded" (with Future and Lil Baby)	White; Wilburn; Dominique Jones; Van der Heijden; Bryan Trillos; Jideonwo	Loesoe; Jideonwo; Redda	2:55
5.	"Knight Crawler" (with Juice Wrld)	White; Jarad Higgins; Christopher Barnett	CBMix	2:57
6.	"Van Helsing"	White; Matura; Mathias Daniel Liyew; Mamet; Jideonwo	Mamet; Jideonwo; Ambezza; Nadddot	2:53
7.	"Dark Brotherhood" (with Lil Baby)	White; Jones; Matura; Bosley	Nadddot; Bosley	3:39
8.	"Free Rio"	White; Hunter Roberts; Jideonwo; Raymond Herring; Bosley	Bosley; Hunter; Jideonwo; Rott	2:59
9.	"Krzy Train" (with Travis Scott)	White; Jacques Webster II; Dreamr; Mamet; Roberts; Jideonwo; Bosley	Bosley; Dreamr; Hunter; Jideonwo	3:50
10.	"Muscles" (with Lil Durk)	White; Durk Banks; Anton Martin Mendo; Sil van Bebber	UK24; star boy	3:11
11.	"Goodfellas" (with Nardo Wick)	White; Horace Walls III; Tim Gomringer; Kevin Gomringer; Van der Heijden	Loesoe; Cubeatz; Ellis Lost	2:46
12.	"Killionaire"	White; Matura; Mamet; Jideonwo	Mamet; Jideonwo; Nadddot	2:36
13.	"High Hopes" (with Big30)	White; Rodney Wright, Jr.; Darrell Jackson; Mamet	Chopsquad DJ; Mamet	2:53
14.	"Die Die" (with Lucki)	White; Lucki Camel, Jr.; Malikai Temesgen; Jideonwo; van Bebber	UK24; Jideonwo; malikai	3:12
15.	"Who Else!" (with Rich the Kid)	White; Dimitri Roger; Van der Heijden; Roberts	Loesoe; Hunter	2:27
16.	"Biggest Bird" (with Summrs)	White; Deante Johnson; Zodiac	Zodiac; PAX	2:46
17.	"Hideout" (with Fijimacintosh)	White; Tyvion Harris; Van der Heijden; van Bebber; Vladislav Piasetskyi	Loesoe; UK24	2:50
18.	"Witchcraft" (with Rylo Rodriguez)	White; Ryan Adams; Matura; T9C	Nadddot; T9C	2:37
19.	"Toilet Water" (with Ski Mask the Slump God)	White; Stokeley Goulbourne; Jideonwo; Bosley	Bosley; Jideonwo	2:57
20.	"Pure" (with G Herbo)	White; Herbert Wright; Jideonwo; Jackson	Chopsquad DJ; Jideonwo	3:14
21.	"Rock Out" (with Chief Keef)	White; Cozart; Noir Brent; Hitmula	Hitmula; BrentRambo	2:06
22.	"Armageddon" (with Rob49)	White; Robert Thomas; Matura; Mamet; 4OUR	Mamet; 4OUR; Nadddot	2:27
23.	"Nun" (with DaBaby)	White; Jonathan Kirk; van Bebber; Roberts	UK24; Hunter	2:33
24.	"Swag Like Ohio Pt. 2" (with Lil B)	White; Brandon McCartney; Roberts; Bosley	Bosley; Hunter	3:00
25.	"Colors" (with Kodak Black)	White; Bill Kapri; Jordan Jenks	Pi'erre Bourne	2:44
Total length:				76:00

== Personnel ==
- Trippie Redd – vocals
- Igor Mamet – mastering, mixing, engineering
- Matt Spats – guitar (track 1)
- Chief Keef – vocals (2, 21)
- Future – vocals (3, 4)
- Lil Baby – vocals (4, 7)
- Juice Wrld – vocals (5)
- Travis Scott – vocals (9)
- Lil Durk – vocals (10)
- Nardo Wick – vocals (11)
- Big30 – vocals (13)
- Lucki – vocals (14)
- Rich the Kid – vocals (15)
- Summrs – vocals (16)
- Fijimacintosh – vocals (17)
- Rylo Rodriguez – vocals (18)
- Ski Mask the Slump God – vocals (19)
- G Herbo – vocals (20)
- Rob49 – vocals (22)
- DaBaby – vocals (23)
- Lil B – vocals (24)
- Kodak Black – vocals (25)

== Charts ==
=== Weekly charts ===
Weekly chart performance for Mansion Musik
Chart (2023)	Peak position
Australian Albums (ARIA)	73
Austrian Albums (Ö3 Austria)	31
Belgian Albums (Ultratop Flanders)	77
Canadian Albums (Billboard)	9
Dutch Albums (Album Top 100)	39
French Albums (SNEP)	174
German Albums (Offizielle Top 100)	51
New Zealand Albums (RMNZ)	40
Norwegian Albums (VG-lista)	29
Swiss Albums (Schweizer Hitparade)	19
UK Albums (Official Charts)	79
US Billboard 200	3
US Top R&B/Hip-Hop Albums (Billboard)	2

=== Year-end charts ===
Year-end chart performance for Mansion Musik
Chart (2023)	Position
US Top R&B/Hip-Hop Albums (Billboard)	88
