= We Don't Get Along =

Single by Juice Wrld and Marshmello
- Released: March 6, 2026
- Recorded: 2019
- Genre: Emo rap; trap
- Length: 2:29
- Label: Joytime Collective; Grade A; Interscope
- Songwriters: Jarad Higgins; Christopher Comstock
- Producer: Marshmello

Juice Wrld singles chronology
"The Way" (2025)	"We Don't Get Along" (2026)

Marshmello singles chronology
"Kissin' My Friends" (2025)	"We Don't Get Along" (2026)	"Phoenix" (2026)

"We Don't Get Along" is a song by American rapper Juice Wrld and American DJ Marshmello, released on March 6, 2026.

== Composition ==
"We Don't Get Along" is a melodic rap song. Composed of guitar riffs and trap percussion, it finds Juice Wrld exploring his heartbreak from conflicts in relationships.

== Critical reception ==
Tallie Spencer of HotNewHipHop wrote that the song "highlights Juice WRLD's signature vulnerability" and "Marshmello's production frames the track with polished electronic textures, giving the record a cinematic, late-night feel." Cameron Sunkel of EDM.com remarked that Juice Wrld "turns pain into melody without sanding off any of the darkness. It's a source of tension that has always been central to his music and remains a big reason his posthumous releases continue to resonate more than six years after his death."

== Charts ==
Chart performance for "We Don't Get Along"
Chart (2026)	Peak position
US Bubbling Under Hot 100 (Billboard)	2
US Hot R&B/Hip-Hop Songs (Billboard)	32
