= Knight Crawler =

2023 song by Trippie Redd and Juice Wrld

Single by Trippie Redd and Juice Wrld

from the album Mansion Musik
- Released: January 19, 2023
- Genre: Rap metal; screamo rap
- Length: 2:57
- Label: 1400 Entertainment; 10K Projects
- Songwriters: Michael White IV; Jarad Higgins; CB Mix
- Producer: CB Mix

"Knight Crawler" is a song by American rappers Trippie Redd and Juice Wrld. It was released on January 19, 2023, as a single from Trippie Redd's fifth studio album Mansion Musik (2023).

== Critical reception ==
Andre Gee of Rolling Stone stated that Trippie Redd "matches the late Juice WRLD's conviction on" the song, "wailing 'Don't know where I'm from, don't know where I've been'".

== Credits and personnel ==
- Trippie Redd – vocals, songwriting
- Juice Wrld – vocals, songwriting
- CB Mix – production, songwriting
- Igor Mamet – mastering, mixing, recording

== Charts ==
Chart performance for "Knight Crawler"
Chart (2023)	Peak position
Canada Hot 100 (Billboard)	61
Global 200 (Billboard)	108
New Zealand Hot Singles (RMNZ)	8
US Billboard Hot 100	52
US Hot R&B/Hip-Hop Songs (Billboard)	19
