= Face 2 Face (Juice Wrld song) =

2022 single by Juice Wrld

Single by Juice Wrld

from the album Legends Never Die (5th Anniversary Edition)
- Released: December 15, 2022
- Length: 2:04
- Label: Grade A; Interscope
- Songwriters: Jarad Higgins; Joe Reeves; Rex Kudo; Ryan Vojtesak
- Producers: Charlie Handsome; Rex Kudo; Joe Reeves

Juice Wrld singles chronology
"In My Head" (2022)	"Face 2 Face" (2022)	"The Light" (2023)

Music video
- "Face 2 Face" on YouTube

"Face 2 Face" is a song by American rapper Juice Wrld. It was released as a single on December 15, 2022, by Grade A Productions and Interscope Records. The song was produced by Charlie Handsome, Rex Kudo, and Joe Reeves. The song was later added to Juice Wrld's third studio album, Legends Never Die, as part of the 5th Anniversary Edition.

== Background ==
"Face 2 Face" was first previewed on December 8, 2022, at the second annual Juice Wrld Day event, with the song's release date being announced on the same day. The song's cover art was designed by Majinboof and revealed on December 13; Majinboof is also known for designing the cover art for Juice Wrld's first studio album, Goodbye & Good Riddance, and the singles "All Girls Are the Same", "Lucid Dreams", "Wasted", and "In My Head".

== Composition ==
Over an acoustic guitar-heavy production, Juice Wrld sings about his struggles with sleep paralysis. The song opens with Juice Wrld describing what an episode of the condition is typically like for him, saying that his mind becomes a "bloody scene" as "evil" begins to grab hold and he "[detaches] from reality". Following the opening chorus, the song features only a single verse, in which Juice Wrld sings that he feels as if his artistic abilities are a curse, akin to Midas' golden touch. In the second half of the verse, he likens himself to a sinking ship while also making references to "monsters", like "the Devil", that haunt his dreams and seek to "bring [him] down".

== Music video ==
The official music video was directed by Steve Cannon and released on December 15, 2022. It follows a young woman as she spends the night alone and experiences an episode of sleep paralysis. Matching the lyrics of the song, the woman's experience is very similar to Juice Wrld's, with multiple evil spirits and a creature resembling the Devil appearing in her room and towering over her as she lays paralyzed in fear; the video ends with the woman waking up from the episode in shock, before the definition of sleep paralysis is displayed on screen.

== Charts ==
Chart performance for "Face 2 Face"
Chart (2022–2023)	Peak position
Canada Hot 100 (Billboard)	82
Global 200 (Billboard)	150
Netherlands (Single Tip)	9
New Zealand Hot Singles (RMNZ)	7
UK Singles (OCC)	98
UK Hip Hop/R&B (OCC)	29
US Billboard Hot 100	92
US Hot R&B/Hip-Hop Songs (Billboard)	33
