= AGATS2 (Insecure) =

2024 single by Juice Wrld and Nicki Minaj

Single by Juice Wrld and Nicki Minaj

from the album The Party Never Ends
- Released: November 15, 2024
- Genre: Emo rap; trap-pop
- Length: 3:19
- Label: Grade A; Interscope
- Songwriters: Jarad Higgins; Onika Maraj; Louis Bell; Ashley Frangipane
- Producer: Bell

Juice Wrld singles chronology
"Lace It" (2023)	"AGATS2 (Insecure)" (2024)	"Whoa (Mind in Awe) [Remix]" (2025)

Nicki Minaj singles chronology
"Big Foot" (2024)	"AGATS2 (Insecure)" (2024)

"AGATS2 (Insecure)" is a song by American rappers Juice Wrld and Nicki Minaj. It was posthumously released through Grade A Productions and Interscope Records as the second and final single from the former's fifth and final studio album, The Party Never Ends, on November 15, 2024. It also serves as a sequel to his 2018 debut single, "All Girls Are the Same". An emo rap and trap-pop song, it was solely produced by Louis Bell and features background vocals from American singer Halsey, who both wrote it with the two artists.

== Composition and lyrics ==
"AGATS2 (Insecure)" is a trap-pop song that finds both artists rapping and singing. Juice Wrld expresses his sorrow from unrequited love in the first verse, starting with the opening line from the original "All Girls Are the Same" ("I admit it, another ho got me finished") and mentioning how he self-medicates. His tone changes from sad to aggressive as he directs his attention to the boyfriend of the woman he loves, even suggesting to kill him. Nicki Minaj sings the last line of the verse, referencing lyrics from her feature on "My Chick Bad" by Ludacris ("It's Friday the 13th and guess who playing Jason"). On the chorus, Juice Wrld sings "And your insecurities / Will get the best of me". The second verse finds Minaj briefly taking shots at her detractors, before Juice Wrld details trying to recover from a night of taking many drugs. Minaj follows with a short verse of her own, in which she raps about not being the partner in the relationship who is insecure.

== Critical reception ==
Elias Andrews of HotNewHipHop wrote, "The instrumental is classic Juice WRLD. It's spacey, bassy, and allows for the rapper's vocals to weave in and out. Juice WRLD often had an echo effect applied to his vocals that made it seem as though he was projecting from a huge, empty room. And the decision to do so here is reminder of his unique voice. It's a pretty melodic cut, overall, so it should come as no surprise that Nicki Minaj decides to take a more soft approach on her feature. She doesn't drop an aggressive sixteen, but rather harmonizes with Juice in a way that compliments both of their voices. 'AGATS2 (Insecure)' isn't a mind-blowing Juice song, but it's proof that there's plenty of quality material that fans have yet to hear."

== Charts ==
Chart performance for "AGATS2 (Insecure)"
Chart (2024–2025)	Peak position
Canada Hot 100 (Billboard)	100
Global 200 (Billboard)	167
Ireland (IRMA)	29
New Zealand Hot Singles (RMNZ)	15
Suriname (Nationale Top 40)	25
UK Singles (Official Charts)	89
UK Hip Hop/R&B (Official Charts)	34
US Billboard Hot 100	68
US Hot R&B/Hip-Hop Songs (Billboard)	16
US Rhythmic Airplay (Billboard)	23

== Release history ==
Release dates and formats for "AGATS2 (Insecure)"
Region	Date	Format(s)	Version	Label(s)	Ref.
Various	November 15, 2024	Digital download; streaming	Original	Grade A Productions; Interscope Records	
Various	November 19, 2024	Digital download; streaming	Sped Up	Grade A Productions; Interscope Records	
Various	November 19, 2024	Digital download; streaming	Slowed	Grade A Productions; Interscope Records	
Various	November 19, 2024	Digital download; streaming	Instrumental	Grade A Productions; Interscope Records	
Various	November 21, 2024	Digital download; streaming	Extended	Grade A Productions; Interscope Records	
