= The Party Never Ends =

Studio album by Juice WRLD
- Released: November 29, 2024
- Length: 54:24
- Labels: Grade A; Interscope
- Producers: Andrew Watt; Benny Blanco; Blake Slatkin; Boi-1da; Cashmere Cat; Charlie Handsome; DT; Happy Perez; Louis Bell; Metro Boomin; Nick Mira; Purps on the Beat; Rex Kudo; SoundsBy8; Tommy Brown; Zaytoven

Juice WRLD chronology
The Pre-Party (2024)	The Party Never Ends (2024)	The Outsiders (2026)

Singles from The Party Never Ends
- 1. "Lace It" Released: December 16, 2023; 2. "AGATS2 (Insecure)" Released: November 15, 2024

The Party Never Ends is the fifth studio album by the American rapper Juice Wrld. It was posthumously released through Grade A Productions and Interscope Records on November 29, 2024, nearly five years after his death in December 2019. The album contains guest appearances from Nicki Minaj, Benny Blanco, Eminem, the Kid Laroi, Offset, and Fall Out Boy. Various producers contributed to the album, including Blanco, Cashmere Cat, Happy Perez, Nick Mira, Boi-1da, Tommy Brown, Blake Slatkin, Charlie Handsome, Metro Boomin, Andrew Watt, Purps on the Beat, and Zaytoven. It was marketed as Juice WRLD’s final album until the announcement of The Outsiders coming soon from his manager Lil Bibby.

== Release and promotion ==
In July 2021, Juice Wrld's manager, Lil Bibby, revealed the title of the album and shared what his plan with it would be. In February 2023, his estate announced that the album was in active development. After teasing the album's release, the lead single of the album, "Lace It", a collaboration with American rapper Eminem and American record producer Benny Blanco, was released on December 16, 2023. A two-track extended play, The Pre-Party, was released as a precursor to the album on September 9, 2024. The second and final single of the album, "AGATS2 (Insecure)", a collaboration with Trinidadian rapper Nicki Minaj, was released on November 15, 2024.

The album's cover art, which was designed by Japanese contemporary artist Takashi Murakami, was revealed on November 21, 2024. Juice Wrld's estate collaborated with Epic Games to include a character skin of Juice Wrld in Fortnite Battle Royale. At the end of Chapter 2 Remix of Fortnite Battle Royale, a virtual concert was held in tribute to Juice Wrld on November 30, 2024.

On November 30, 2024, an expanded version of the album, titled The Party Never Ends 2.0, was released, replacing the album's original version on streaming services. It includes the additional song "Empty Out Your Pockets", placed between "Cuffed" and "KTM Drip" on the album's track listing.

A deluxe edition of the album, consisting of ten additional tracks that fans voted for, was expected to be released in early 2025, although it has been delayed several times for unknown reasons. In July 2026, it was reported that its release has been cancelled.

== Critical reception ==
Professional ratings
Review scores
Source	Rating
AllMusic	2.5/5 stars
Clash	5/10

The Party Never Ends received mixed-to-negative reviews from critics, who criticized the album for its unfinished sound, bland production, and poor curation of tracks. The album's release was viewed by many fans and critics as an attempt by the label to capitalize off of Juice Wrld's legacy, with fans noting that Juice Wrld had plenty of quality unreleased tracks that were inexplicably left off the album. Robin Murray of Clash wrote that the album lacked a cohesive identity and that the album's material remained "unfinished for a reason." Fred Thomas of AllMusic criticized the album for feeling like "the underheated remaining scraps" of his unreleased material. While he named tracks such as "AGATS2 (Insecure)" and the Kid Laroi's tribute song "Goodbye" as exceptions, he described collaborations such "Lace It" with Eminem as "awkward", with Juice Wrld's presence on the track minimized. He wrote that songs such as "Best Friend" with Fall Out Boy continued this trend, describing it as one of several "placeholder" tracks and concluding that the album overall lacked songs that approach the quality of Juice Wrld's best work.

== Commercial performance ==
The Party Never Ends debuted at number four on the US Billboard 200, with 86,000 album-equivalent units in its first week, including 123.43 million on-demand streams of the songs, and 2,000 in album sales.

== Track listing ==
The Party Never Ends track listing
No.	Title	Writer(s)	Producer(s)	Length
1.	"The Party Never Ends"	Jarad Higgins; Benjamin Levin; Magnus Høiberg; Carlton McDowell, Jr.; Jevais Harris	Benny Blanco; Cashmere Cat; SoundsBy8	2:20
2.	"Misfit"	Higgins; Høiberg; Nathan Perez	Benny Blanco; Cashmere Cat; Happy Perez	2:39
3.	"AGATS2 (Insecure)" (with Nicki Minaj)	Higgins; Onika Maraj; Ashley Frangipane; Louis Bell	Bell	3:19
4.	"Lace It" (with Eminem and Benny Blanco)	Higgins; Marshall Mathers III; Levin; Høiberg; Perez; Luis Resto	Benny Blanco; Cashmere Cat; Happy Perez; Eminem^{[a]}	3:37
5.	"Cuffed"	Higgins; Levin; Høiberg; Nicholas Mira	Benny Blanco; Cashmere Cat; Nick Mira	4:04
6.	"KTM Drip"	Higgins; Mira; Dorien Theus	Mira; DT	4:00
7.	"Love Letter"	Higgins; Andrew Wotman; Levin; Høiberg; Mira; Theus	Benny Blanco; Cashmere Cat; Mira; DT	2:39
8.	"Condone It"	Higgins; Matthew Samuels; Thomas Brown	Boi-1da; Tommy Brown	3:00
9.	"Goodbye" (performed by the Kid Laroi)	Charlton Howard; Nathaniel Ruess; Blake Slatkin; Levin; Høiberg	Slatkin; Benny Blanco; Cashmere Cat	2:41
10.	"Party by Myself"	Higgins; Ryan Vojtesak; Masamune Kudo	Charlie Handsome; Rex Kudo	3:18
11.	"Adore You"	Higgins; Mira	Mira	2:47
12.	"Celebrate" (with Offset)	Higgins; Kiari Cephus; Leland Wayne	Metro Boomin	3:00
13.	"Jeffrey"	Higgins; Mira	Mira	2:55
14.	"Barbarian"	Higgins; Mira; Theus	Mira; DT	2:30
15.	"Best Friend" (with Fall Out Boy)	Higgins; Patrick Stump; Pete Wentz; Levin; Høiberg; Wotman	Benny Blanco; Cashmere Cat; Andrew Watt	2:36
16.	"Floor It"	Higgins; Vojtesak; Kudo	Charlie Handsome; Kudo	3:12
17.	"Oxycodone"	Higgins; Nathaniel Caserta	Purps on the Beat	2:40
18.	"Spend It"	Higgins; Xavier Dotson; Levin; Høiberg	Zaytoven	3:00
Total length:				54:24

The Party Never Ends 2.0 track listing
No.	Title	Writer(s)	Producer(s)	Length
6.	"Empty Out Your Pockets"	Higgins; Mira	Mira	2:15
Total length:				56:39

Notes

- ^{^[a]} signifies a co-producer

== Personnel ==
Musicians

- Juice Wrld – vocals
- Pop Wansel – background vocals (tracks 1, 2, 3, 4, 5)
- Benny Blanco – background vocals (track 5), guitar (tracks 1, 5, 9), keyboards (tracks 1, 2, 4, 5, 7, 9, 15), programming (track 4), vocals (track 4)
- Cashmere Cat – background vocals (track 5), guitar (tracks 1, 5), keyboards (tracks 1, 2, 4, 5, 7, 9, 15), programming (track 4)
- Happy Perez – guitar (tracks 2, 3, 4), keyboards (tracks 2, 4), programming (track 4)
- Nicki Minaj – vocals (track 3)
- Halsey – background vocals (track 3)
- Luis Resto – additional keyboards (track 4), programming (track 4)
- Eminem – vocals (track 4)
- Nick Mira – guitar (track 5), keyboards (tracks 5, 7)
- Dorien "DT" Theus – keyboards (track 7)
- Blake Slatkin – guitar (track 9), keyboards (track 9)
- The Kid Laroi – vocals (track 9)
- Offset – vocals (track 12)
- Andrew Watt – bass (track 15), drums (track 15), guitar (track 15), keyboard (tracks 15)
- Patrick Stump – vocals (track 15)

Technical

- Dave Kutch – mastering (tracks 1, 2, 4–18)
- Zach Pereyra – mastering (track 3)
- Benny Blanco – mixing (tracks 1, 2, 4–18), engineering (tracks 1, 2, 4–18)
- Cashmere Cat – mixing (tracks 1, 2, 4–18), engineering (tracks 1, 2, 4–18)
- Manny Marroquin – mixing (track 3)
- Carlton McDowell – engineering (tracks 1)
- Chris Sclafani – engineering (tracks 1, 2, 4–18)
- Max Lord – engineering (tracks 1, 6–8, 10, 12–14, 16–18)
- Louis Bell – engineering (track 3)
- Aubry "Big Juice" Delaine – engineering (track 3)
- Mike Strange – engineering (track 4)
- Tony Campana – engineering (track 4)
- Blake Slatkin – engineering (track 9)
- Patrick Stump – engineering (track 15)
- Paul LaMalfa – engineering (track 15)
- Anthony Vilchis – mixing assistance (track 3)
- Trey Station – mixing assistance (track 3)

== Charts ==
=== Weekly charts ===
Weekly chart performance for The Party Never Ends
Chart (2024–2025)	Peak position
Australian Albums (ARIA)	17
Australian Hip Hop/R&B Albums (ARIA)	3
Austrian Albums (Ö3 Austria)	10
Belgian Albums (Ultratop Flanders)	12
Belgian Albums (Ultratop Wallonia)	150
Canadian Albums (Billboard)	5
Danish Albums (Hitlisten)	14
Dutch Albums (Album Top 100)	9
Finnish Albums (Suomen virallinen lista)	37
French Albums (SNEP)	119
German Albums (Offizielle Top 100)	27
Hungarian Albums (MAHASZ)	6
Icelandic Albums (Tónlistinn)	28
Irish Albums (Official Charts)	12
Italian Albums (FIMI)	83
Lithuanian Albums (AGATA)	20
New Zealand Albums (RMNZ)	14
Nigerian Albums (TurnTable)	27
Norwegian Albums (VG-lista)	12
Polish Albums (ZPAV)	52
Portuguese Albums (AFP)	39
Swedish Albums (Sverigetopplistan)	26
Swiss Albums (Schweizer Hitparade)	11
UK Albums (Official Charts)	5
UK R&B Albums (Official Charts)	9
US Billboard 200	4
US Top R&B/Hip-Hop Albums (Billboard)	2

=== Year-end charts ===
Year-end chart performance for The Party Never Ends
Chart (2025)	Position
US Billboard 200	173
US Top R&B/Hip-Hop Albums (Billboard)	56

== Certifications ==
Certifications for The Party Never Ends
Region	Certification	Certified units/sales
United Kingdom (BPI)	Silver	60,000^{‡}
^{‡} Sales+streaming figures based on certification alone.
