= Cigarettes (song) =

2022 single by Juice Wrld

Single by Juice Wrld

from the album Fighting Demons (Extended)
- Released: February 2, 2022
- Recorded: 2018
- Length: 3:47
- Label: Grade A; Interscope
- Songwriters: Jarad Higgins; Nicholas Mira
- Producer: Nick Mira

Juice Wrld singles chronology
"Wandered to LA" (2021)	"Cigarettes" (2022)	"Bye Bye" (2022)

Music video
- "Cigarettes" on YouTube

"Cigarettes" is a song by American rapper Juice Wrld. After being leaked for several years, it was released on February 2, 2022, by Grade A Productions and Interscope Records. The song was produced by Nick Mira. It was later added to Juice Wrld's fourth studio album Fighting Demons as a part of the extended edition.

== Background ==
The song first leaked online in October 2018. It continuously garnered attention on the Internet over the next three years. On February 2, 2022, Juice Wrld's estate uploaded the song to streaming services, surprising fans. The single was released alongside an animated music video and another song from Juice Wrld, "Go Hard 2.0".

== Composition ==
Over guitar-laden production, Juice Wrld sings about not wanting to be lonely and his feelings for his loved one, as well as his addiction to smoking.

== Music video ==
The official music video was directed by Steve Cannon and released on March 3, 2022. It follows a young man named Derek (played by Logan Shroyer) whose addiction to alcohol leads to the loss of his job as a warehouse worker and the end of his relationship with his girlfriend. The man begins a journey of being sober for 999 days (a reference to the number which Juice Wrld is associated with) and achieves his goal. However, during a night out with his friends (one of whom is played by actor Angus Cloud), Derek goes to the bar and orders a drink, tempted to drink again. He flips his sobriety coin to decide. After it lands, his ex-girlfriend stops him and they happily walk away, rekindling their relationship.

== Charts ==
Chart performance for "Cigarettes"
Chart (2022)	Peak position
Australia (ARIA)	79
Australia Hip Hop/R&B (ARIA)	22
Austria (Ö3 Austria Top 40)	50
Canada Hot 100 (Billboard)	24
Germany (GfK)	55
Global 200 (Billboard)	36
Greece International (IFPI)	83
Ireland (IRMA)	37
Netherlands (Single Top 100)	78
New Zealand Hot Singles (RMNZ)	3
Portugal (AFP)	118
South Africa Streaming (TOSAC)	81
Sweden (Sverigetopplistan)	87
Switzerland (Schweizer Hitparade)	77
UK Singles (Official Charts)	37
UK Hip Hop/R&B (Official Charts)	20
US Billboard Hot 100	43
US Hot R&B/Hip-Hop Songs (Billboard)	12

== Certifications ==
Certifications for "Cigarettes"
Region	Certification	Certified units/sales
New Zealand (RMNZ)	Gold	15,000^{‡}
United Kingdom (BPI)	Silver	200,000^{‡}
^{‡} Sales+streaming figures based on certification alone.

== Release history ==
Release history for "Cigarettes"
Region	Date	Format	Label	Ref.
Various	February 2, 2022	Digital download; streaming	Grade A; Interscope	
United States	March 1, 2022	Rhythmic contemporary	Grade A; Interscope	
