= Wandered to LA =

2021 single by Juice Wrld and Justin Bieber

Single by Juice Wrld and Justin Bieber

from the album Fighting Demons
- Released: December 3, 2021
- Recorded: 2018 (Justin Bieber’s vocals in 2021)
- Genre: Pop-rap
- Length: 3:09
- Label: Interscope; Grade A
- Songwriters: Jarad Higgins; Justin Bieber; Louis Bell; Bernard Harvey; Omer Fedi
- Producers: Bell; Harv

Juice Wrld singles chronology
"Already Dead" (2021)	"Wandered to LA" (2021)	"Cigarettes" (2022)

Justin Bieber singles chronology
"Lonely Christmas" (2021)	"Wandered to LA" (2021)	"Attention" (2022)

Lyric video
- "Wandered to LA" on YouTube

"Wandered to LA" is a song by American rapper and singer Juice WRLD and Canadian singer Justin Bieber. It was released on December 3, 2021, under Interscope Records and Grade A Productions as the second single from Juice's fourth studio album Fighting Demons, which was released posthumously. Juice and Bieber wrote the song with American record producers Louis Bell and Harv and Israeli songwriter and producer Omer Fedi; Juice had first previewed the song in September 2018, before Bieber was added to it.

== Composition and lyrics ==
"Wandered to LA" is a "glossy pop" song that is set in the key of C major with a tempo of 135 beats per minute. Writing for GQ, Grant Rindner felt that the song was "true to the artist Juice was becoming"; in the chorus and his verse, Juice details his love for consuming drugs, while Bieber details his effort to make a relationship work in his verse.

== Release and promotion ==
On December 2, 2021, what would have been Juice's 23rd birthday, his team announced the single's imminent release along with Bieber being added as the co-lead artist. A trailer video was also released on the same day, which details Juice and Bieber separately talking about their respective previous drug addictions and advising their fans to speak out about loneliness.

== Critical reception ==
Writing for Variety, A.D. Amorosi praised Bieber's verse on "Wandered to LA" and said that it was one of his favorites on Fighting Demons, stating "the gently jiving and soulful track is there to support Juice's jazziest-ever vocal line, with Bieber offering up a similarly slippery sing-song-iness," adding that "as a guest shot, Bieber and Juice sound as if they're playing off one another – the very point of what a dynamic feature should sound like, whether or not its host is living or deceased." Kyann-Sian Williams of NME opined that over the "breezy guitar strums" of the song, the two artists "detail their relationships", acknowledged Juice rapping about "dark themes" in his verse ("Maybe it's because the lies, they fill her up / You see the ghost on her front porch"), but did not agree with Bieber's contribution to the song as the "lines and melodies" in his verse, "although sweet, don't fit in so well with such gothic tone of the song" (“Reminiscing about the days you broke my heart / Thankful that we worked it out – we come so far").

== Charts ==
Chart performance for "Wandered to LA"
Chart (2021–2022)	Peak position
Australia (ARIA)	44
Australia Hip Hop/R&B (ARIA)	12
Canada Hot 100 (Billboard)	29
Germany (GfK)	89
Global 200 (Billboard)	44
Greece (IFPI)	59
Ireland (IRMA)	45
Japan Hot Overseas (Billboard)	20
Lithuania (AGATA)	71
Netherlands (Single Top 100)	89
New Zealand Hot Singles (RMNZ)	4
Portugal (AFP)	79
South Africa (RISA)	78
Sweden Heatseeker (Sverigetopplistan)	3
Switzerland (Schweizer Hitparade)	73
UK Singles (OCC)	59
UK Hip Hop/R&B (OCC)	13
US Billboard Hot 100	49
US Hot R&B/Hip-Hop Songs (Billboard)	9
US Pop Airplay (Billboard)	32
US Rhythmic Airplay (Billboard)	19

== Release history ==
Release dates and formats for "Wandered to LA"
Region	Date	Format(s)	Label(s)	Ref.
Various	December 3, 2021	Digital download; streaming	Grade A; Interscope	
United States	December 7, 2021	Rhythmic contemporary radio	Grade A; Interscope	
Italy	December 17, 2021	Radio airplay	Universal	
