= Lace It =

2023 single by Juice Wrld, Eminem and Benny Blanco

Single by Juice Wrld, Eminem and Benny Blanco

from the album The Party Never Ends
- Released: December 16, 2023
- Genre: Hip-hop
- Length: 3:37
- Label: Grade A; Interscope
- Songwriters: Jarad Higgins; Marshall Mathers; Benjamin Levin; Nathan Perez; Luis Resto; Magnus Høiberg
- Producers: Benny Blanco; Cashmere Cat; Eminem; Happy Perez

Juice Wrld singles chronology
"Doomsday" (2023)	"Lace It" (2023)	"AGATS2 (Insecure)" (2024)

Eminem singles chronology
"Realest" (2023)	"Lace It" (2023)	"Houdini" (2024)

Benny Blanco singles chronology
"Bad Decisions" (2022)	"Lace It" (2023)

"Lace It" is a song by American rappers Juice Wrld and Eminem, and American record producer Benny Blanco. It was released through Grade A Productions and Interscope Records on December 16, 2023, as the lead single from the former's fifth and final studio album, The Party Never Ends (2024). The three artists wrote the song with Happy Perez, Luis Resto, and Cashmere Cat, who produced it with Blanco while Eminem also co-produced it. The song was released on Juice Wrld Day, an annual festival that is held on the third Saturday of December at the United Center in Juice's hometown of Chicago, Illinois, in which artists perform to pay tribute to the late artist.

== Background ==
In a press release: Juice's mother, Carmela Wallace, spoke about the song:

I can recall Jarad [Anthony Higgins aka Juice WRLD] playing Eminem's music on repeat at home because he was a huge fan. This is a bittersweet moment for me; I am happy that Jarad had a chance to make music with someone he admired and sad that he cannot be here to take in the moment; Jarad left us way too soon.

== Composition and lyrics ==
On the song, Juice talks about the impact of the drugs he took in his lifetime. Eminem reflects on his own struggle with drugs early in his career: "I was lucky, my escape was narrow and due / Now think I take it for granted / That I'm still here, synthetic heroin you tried to kill me, then you murdered Jarad, didn't you? / Juice WRLD / Addiction's like a fuckin' vicious cycle / Juice, we will forever miss you / To the younger generation, I ain't lecturin' you, but man just be careful when you…". He name-drops celebrities that died from drugs, such as Lil Peep, Ol' Dirty Bastard, Shock G, Pimp C, Prince, and Michael Jackson.

== Charts ==
Chart performance
Chart (2023–2024)	Peak position
Canada Hot 100 (Billboard)	55
Global 200 (Billboard)	197
New Zealand Hot Singles (RMNZ)	3
UK Singles (Official Charts)	95
UK Hip Hop/R&B (Official Charts)	34
US Billboard Hot 100	85
US Hot R&B/Hip-Hop Songs (Billboard)	21
