= Burn (Juice Wrld song) =

2021 song by Juice Wrld

Song by Juice Wrld

from the album Fighting Demons
- Released: December 10, 2021
- Recorded: 2019
- Length: 3:37
- Label: Grade A; Interscope
- Songwriters: Jarad Higgins; Joël Fajerman; Leland Wayne
- Producer: Metro Boomin

Music video
- "Burn" on YouTube

"Burn" is a song by American rapper Juice Wrld from his fourth studio album Fighting Demons (2021). Produced by Metro Boomin, it contains a sample of "The Magic of the Orchid" by Joël Fajerman. The song peaked at number 34 on the Billboard Hot 100.

== Composition ==
Lyrically, the song finds Juice Wrld discussing his battle with substance abuse, addiction and anxiety, being "cursed since birth", looking for truth in his life, and that his success and wealth cannot solve these problems. over production which features "gunshot-punctuated percussion" and 808s.

== Critical reception ==
The song received generally positive reviews from critics. Mackenzie Cummings-Grady of HipHopDX wrote, "The galactic twinkle of Metro Boomin's production on opener 'Burn' serves as the perfect catalyst for Juice musing whether his substance abuse has warped his perception of reality." Writing for Rolling Stone, Will Dukes commented that the song "feels like a modern-day equivalent to psychedelic '90s journeymen P.M. Dawn on a track by DJ Premier. The contrasts, while thrilling, don't seem too shocking today. But Juice WRLD hails from the same family tree as P.M. Dawn, who were denounced decades ago for their emo image, bright harmonies, and the kind of content that made Juice WRLD such a beloved figure. 'Burn' is all ragged feels ('This remind me of hell, sometimes I wonder if that's where God really sent me') made melodic. And it’s a testament, thankfully, to how times have changed—that, in his passing, kids in Juice WRLD's axis have a safe space to vent without having their agency challenged."

== Music video ==
The official music video was released on December 10, 2021 alongside Fighting Demons. It shows footage of Juice Wrld reciting the lyrics to the song in the studio, in the company of his friends. The clip is also interspersed with people running for shelter from asteroids bringing the apocalypse. Los Angeles burns under the attack and the Earth explodes at the end of the video.

== Charts ==
Chart performance for "Burn"
Chart (2021)	Peak position
Australia (ARIA)	69
Canada Hot 100 (Billboard)	29
Global 200 (Billboard)	43
Ireland (IRMA)	55
New Zealand Hot Singles (RMNZ)	2
Portugal (AFP)	117
Switzerland (Schweizer Hitparade)	100
UK Singles (OCC)	55
US Billboard Hot 100	34
US Hot R&B/Hip-Hop Songs (Billboard)	6
