= Bye Bye (Marshmello and Juice Wrld song) =

2022 single by Marshmello and Juice Wrld

Single by Marshmello and Juice Wrld
- Released: October 14, 2022
- Recorded: December 19, 2018
- Length: 1:49
- Label: Republic; Joytime Collective
- Songwriters: Christopher Comstock; Jarad Higgins
- Producer: Marshmello

Marshmello singles chronology
| "American Psycho" (2022) | "Bye Bye" (2022) | "Other Boys" (2023) |

Juice Wrld singles chronology
| "Cigarettes" (2022) | "Bye Bye" (2022) | "In My Head" (2022) |

Music video
- "Bye Bye" on YouTube

"Bye Bye" is a song by American record producer Marshmello and American rapper Juice WRLD. It was released through Republic Records and Joytime Collective on October 14, 2022. The song serves as the third collaboration between the two artists, following two joint tracks from Juice's posthumous third studio album, Legends Never Die (2020): "Come & Go" and the Polo G and The Kid Laroi-assisted "Hate the Other Side".

== Background and composition ==
On October 14, 2022, Marshmello spoke about the song and its creation in a press release:

I made this song the first night that I met Juice. I was already such a big fan of his and being able to work with him and make music with him was an absolute honor. With this song, I intended to keep it exactly the way we made it that night. I hope everybody enjoys.

Over melodic bass-heavy production and "a droning synth", Juice Wrld sings about heartbreak, getting cheated on and moving on from the relationship. The song was recorded and first teased by Juice via Instagram in February 2019, around 10 months before his death in December that year.

== Music video ==
The official music video for "Bye Bye", directed by Stripmall, was released on Marshmello's YouTube channel on October 14, 2022. It starts with a teenaged boy dropping a quarter in a machine in an abandoned arcade and making it come to life along with an animated Juice WRLD, as he then starts transporting through time and space.

== Charts ==
Chart performance for "Bye Bye"
| Chart (2022) | Peak position |
|---|---|
| Australia (ARIA) | 67 |
| Austria (Ö3 Austria Top 40) | 56 |
| Canada Hot 100 (Billboard) | 36 |
| Germany (GfK) | 46 |
| Global 200 (Billboard) | 56 |
| Ireland (IRMA) | 48 |
| Lithuania (AGATA) | 81 |
| Netherlands (Single Top 100) | 80 |
| New Zealand Hot Singles (RMNZ) | 2 |
| South Africa (RISA) | 99 |
| Sweden (Sverigetopplistan) | 87 |
| Switzerland (Schweizer Hitparade) | 85 |
| UK Singles (OCC) | 45 |
| UK Hip Hop/R&B (OCC) | 19 |
| US Billboard Hot 100 | 53 |
| US Hot R&B/Hip-Hop Songs (Billboard) | 23 |

== Certifications ==
Certifications for "Bye Bye"
| Region | Certification | Certified units/sales |
|---|---|---|
| United States (RIAA) | Gold | 500,000^{‡} |
^{‡} Sales+streaming figures based on certification alone.
