= Yacht Club (song) =

2018 song by Lil Yachty

Song by Lil Yachty featuring Juice WRLD

from the album Nuthin' 2 Prove
- Released: October 19, 2018
- Length: 2:47
- Label: Capitol; Motown; Quality Control
- Songwriters: Miles McCollum; Jarad Higgins; Earl Bynum
- Producer: Earl on the Beat

"Yacht Club" is a song by American rapper Lil Yachty featuring fellow American rapper Juice WRLD. Written alongside producer Earl On The Beat, it was released as the fifth track off of the former's third studio album Nuthin' 2 Prove. The track peaked at number 91 on the Billboard Hot 100.

== Background ==
One of the lines in the track features Yachty and Juice rapping, "I'm a young king, I might fuck Alexis Texas / But I ain't on no Drake shit, I won't get her pregnant". Yachty said that Drake allegedly laughed at the line.

At the time, we were in the booth together actually. He said it and I was like, 'Wow, okay'. I talked to Drake about it and he said it was all good. He felt there was really no harm. I told Drake before, because I fuck with Drake. Then it came out and he laughed at it.

— Lil Yachty

== Critical reception ==
The track received generally positive reviews. Lawrence Burney of The Fader called the track "smooth" and "catchy". Austin Myers of The Standard called the song "the best track on this project". Thomas Hobbs of Highsnobiety called the song Yachty's "best performance as a rapper" on the album and called the lines on the track "mischievous". Sam Moore of NME called the track "refreshing" and "a much-needed boost".

== Charts ==
Chart (2018)	Peak position
Canada (Canadian Hot 100)	94
New Zealand Hot Singles (RMNZ)	26
US Billboard Hot 100	91
US Hot R&B/Hip-Hop Songs (Billboard)	46

== Certifications ==
Region	Certification	Certified units/sales
Australia (ARIA)	Gold	35,000^{‡}
New Zealand (RMNZ)	Gold	15,000^{‡}
United States (RIAA)	2× Platinum	2,000,000^{‡}
^{‡} Sales+streaming figures based on certification alone.
