= List of Billboard Hot 100 top-ten singles in 2020 =

This is a list of singles that charted in the top ten of the Billboard Hot 100, an all-genre singles chart, in 2020.

== Top-ten singles ==
Key

- ↑ – indicates single's top 10 entry was also its Hot 100 debut
- † – indicates Best performing song of the year
- (#) – 2020 Year-end top 10 single position and rank (Despite not reaching the top 10 on the Billboard Hot 100, peaking at #12, "The Bones" by Maren Morris reached #9 on the Year-end Hot 100 single chart of 2020.)
- The "weeks in top ten" column reflects each song's entire chart life, not just its run during 2020.

List of Billboard Hot 100 top ten singles that peaked in 2020
Top ten entry date	Single	Artist(s)	Peak	Peak date	Weeks in top ten	Ref.
Singles from 2019
November 16	"Memories" (#8)	Maroon 5	2	January 11	18	
December 21	"Dance Monkey"^{[B]}	Tones and I	4	February 29	11	
Singles from 2020
January 11	"The Box" (#3)	Roddy Ricch	1	January 18	25	
January 18	"Yummy" ↑	Justin Bieber	2	January 18	2	
January 25	"Life Is Good" (#7) ^{[I]} ↑	Future featuring Drake	2	January 25	17	
February 1	"Godzilla" ↑	Eminem featuring Juice Wrld	3	February 1	1	
February 8	"Don't Start Now" (#4)	Dua Lipa	2	March 21	20	
February 29	"Intentions"^{[D]}^{[I]}	Justin Bieber featuring Quavo	5	June 20	19	
February 29	"Blinding Lights" † ^{[V]} (#1)	The Weeknd	1	April 4	57	
March 7	"On" ↑	BTS	4	March 7	1	
March 14	"Stupid Love" ↑	Lady Gaga	5	March 14	1	
March 21	"Baby Pluto" ↑	Lil Uzi Vert	6	March 21	1	
March 21	"Lo Mein" ↑	Lil Uzi Vert	8	March 21	1	
March 21	"Silly Watch" ↑	Lil Uzi Vert	9	March 21	1	
March 28	"Adore You" (#6)	Harry Styles	6	April 11	7	
April 4	"Say So"	Doja Cat^{1}	1	May 16	16	
April 18	"Toosie Slide" ↑	Drake	1	April 18	10	
May 2	"Rockstar" (#5) ^{[H]} ↑	DaBaby featuring Roddy Ricch	1	June 13	26	
May 9	"The Scotts" ↑	The Scotts, Travis Scott and Kid Cudi	1	May 9	1	
May 9	"Savage"	Megan Thee Stallion featuring Beyoncé^{2}	1	May 30	14	
May 16	"Pain 1993" ↑	Drake featuring Playboi Carti	7	May 16	1	
May 23	"Stuck with U" ↑	Ariana Grande and Justin Bieber	1	May 23	1	
May 23	"Gooba" ↑	6ix9ine	3	May 23	1	
June 6	"Rain on Me" ↑	Lady Gaga and Ariana Grande	1	June 6	4	
June 13	"Roses"	Saint Jhn	4	July 4	13	
June 27	"Trollz" ↑	6ix9ine and Nicki Minaj	1	June 27	1	
June 27	"The Bigger Picture" ↑	Lil Baby	3	June 27	2	
July 4	"Whats Poppin"	Jack Harlow featuring DaBaby, Tory Lanez and Lil Wayne^{3}	2	July 11	13	
July 4	"Blueberry Faygo"^{[L]}	Lil Mosey	8	July 18	4	
July 11	"Watermelon Sugar"^{[K]}^{[Q]}	Harry Styles	1	August 15	14	
July 11	"We Paid"	Lil Baby and 42 Dugg	10	July 11	1	
July 18	"For the Night"^{[S]} ↑	Pop Smoke featuring Lil Baby and DaBaby	6	July 18	3	
July 25	"Come & Go" ↑	Juice Wrld and Marshmello	2	July 25	2	
July 25	"Wishing Well" ↑	Juice Wrld	5	July 25	1	
July 25	"Conversations" ↑	Juice Wrld	7	July 25	1	
July 25	"Life's a Mess"	Juice Wrld and Halsey	9	July 25	1	
July 25	"Hate the Other Side" ↑	Juice Wrld and Marshmello featuring Polo G and The Kid Laroi	10	July 25	1	
August 1	"Popstar"^{[N]} ↑	DJ Khaled featuring Drake	3	August 1	2	
August 1	"Greece" ↑	DJ Khaled featuring Drake	8	August 1	1	
August 8	"Cardigan" ↑	Taylor Swift	1	August 8	2	
August 8	"The 1" ↑	Taylor Swift	4	August 8	1	
August 8	"Exile" ↑	Taylor Swift featuring Bon Iver	6	August 8	1	
August 8	"Savage Love (Laxed – Siren Beat)"	Jawsh 685 and Jason Derulo^{5}	1	October 17	16	
August 15	"My Future" ↑	Billie Eilish	6	August 15	1	
August 22	"WAP" ↑	Cardi B featuring Megan Thee Stallion	1	August 22	13	
August 22	"Smile" ↑	Juice Wrld and The Weeknd	8	August 22	1	
August 22	"Before You Go"^{[M]}^{[O]}	Lewis Capaldi	9	September 26	4	
August 29	"Laugh Now Cry Later" ↑	Drake featuring Lil Durk	2	August 29	19	
August 29	"7 Summers" ↑	Morgan Wallen	6	August 29	1	
August 29	"I Hope"^{[P]}	Gabby Barrett featuring Charlie Puth^{4}	3	November 21	14	
September 5	"Dynamite"^{[T]}^{[W]} ↑	BTS	1	September 5	13	
September 12	"Mood"	24kGoldn featuring Iann Dior	1	October 24	31	
October 3	"Holy"^{[R]}^{[S]} ↑	Justin Bieber featuring Chance the Rapper	3	October 3	14	
October 10	"Franchise" ↑	Travis Scott featuring Young Thug and M.I.A.	1	October 10	1	
October 17	"Runnin" ↑	21 Savage and Metro Boomin	9	October 17	1	
October 17	"Mr. Right Now" ↑	21 Savage and Metro Boomin featuring Drake	10	October 17	1	
October 24	"Lemonade"	Internet Money and Gunna featuring Don Toliver and Nav	6	November 21	7	
November 7	"Positions" ↑	Ariana Grande	1	November 7	17	
November 7	"Forever After All" ↑	Luke Combs	2	November 7	1	
November 14	"Dakiti"^{[U]} ↑	Bad Bunny and Jhay Cortez	5	December 12	4	
November 28	"Therefore I Am"	Billie Eilish	2	November 28	1	
December 5	"Life Goes On" ↑	BTS	1	December 5	1	
December 5	"Monster" ↑	Shawn Mendes and Justin Bieber	8	December 5	1	
December 26	"Willow" ↑	Taylor Swift	1	December 26	1	

=== 2019 peaks ===
List of Billboard Hot 100 top ten singles in 2020 that peaked in 2019
Top ten entry date	Single	Artist(s)	Peak	Peak date	Weeks in top ten	Ref.
September 14	"Circles" (#2) ^{[J]} ↑	Post Malone	1	November 30	39	
September 21	"Someone You Loved" (#10) ^{[E]}^{[G]}	Lewis Capaldi	1	November 2	27	
October 19	"Highest in the Room"^{[B]} ↑	Travis Scott	1	October 19	4	
October 19	"10,000 Hours"^{[B]} ↑	Dan + Shay and Justin Bieber	4	October 19	14	
November 9	"Lose You to Love Me"^{[B]}	Selena Gomez	1	November 9	10	
November 9	"Good as Hell"	Lizzo	3	November 30	11	
November 30	"Everything I Wanted"^{[C]}^{[E]}^{[G]}	Billie Eilish	8	November 30	8	
December 7	"Roxanne"	Arizona Zervas	4	December 28	18	
December 14	"Heartless"^{[F]}	The Weeknd	1	December 14	2	

=== 2021 peaks ===
List of Billboard Hot 100 top ten singles in 2020 that peaked in 2021
Top ten entry date	Single	Artist(s)	Peak	Peak date	Weeks in top ten	Ref.
August 1	"Go Crazy"^{[L]}	Chris Brown and Young Thug	3	March 6	13	
November 14	"34+35" ↑	Ariana Grande^{6}	2	January 30	10	

=== Holiday season ===
Holiday titles first making the Billboard Hot 100 top ten during the 2020–21 holiday season
Top ten entry date	Single	Artist(s)	Peak	Peak date	Weeks in top ten	Ref.
December 19, 2020	"Feliz Navidad"	José Feliciano	6	January 2, 2021	9	

Recurring holiday titles, appearing in the Billboard Hot 100 top ten in previous holiday seasons
Top ten entry date	Single	Artist(s)	Peak	Peak date	Weeks in top ten	Ref.
December 30, 2017	"All I Want for Christmas Is You"^{[U]}	Mariah Carey	1	December 21, 2019	43	
December 29, 2018	"It's the Most Wonderful Time of the Year"^{[A]}^{[V]}	Andy Williams	5	January 2, 2021	24	
January 5, 2019	"Rockin' Around the Christmas Tree"^{[U]}	Brenda Lee	1	December 9, 2023	35	
January 5, 2019	"Jingle Bell Rock"^{[U]}	Bobby Helms	2	December 27, 2025	32	
January 5, 2019	"A Holly Jolly Christmas"^{[W]}	Burl Ives	4	January 4, 2020	26	

== Notes ==
^{1} Nicki Minaj was credited as a featured artist on "Say So" for the weeks ending May 16, 2020, and May 23, 2020. Prior to those two weeks, and since those two weeks, the solo version by Doja Cat has been the official listing on the Hot 100.
^{2} Beyoncé started being credited as a featured artist on "Savage" from the week ending May 16, 2020.
^{3} DaBaby, Tory Lanez and Lil Wayne started being credited as featured artists on "Whats Poppin" from the week ending July 11, 2020.
^{4} Charlie Puth started being credited as a featured artist on "I Hope" from the week ending October 3, 2020.
^{5} BTS was a credited act on "Savage Love (Laxed – Siren Beat)" for the week ending October 17, 2020, when the song reached number one, as remixes of the song figured into the song's chart points. As of the chart dated October 24, 2020, BTS is no longer credited.
^{6} A remix of Ariana Grande's "34+35" that features Doja Cat and Megan Thee Stallion helped to bring the song back into the top ten, to its peak position of number 2, on January 30, 2021, and all three artists were credited on the song that week.

^{A} The single re-entered the top ten on the week ending January 4, 2020.
^{B} The single re-entered the top ten on the week ending January 11, 2020.
^{C} The single re-entered the top ten on the week ending February 8, 2020.
^{D} The single re-entered the top ten on the week ending March 14, 2020.
^{E} The single re-entered the top ten on the week ending March 28, 2020.
^{F} The single re-entered the top ten on the week ending April 4, 2020.
^{G} The single re-entered the top ten on the week ending April 11, 2020.
^{H} The single re-entered the top ten on the week ending May 16, 2020.
^{I} The single re-entered the top ten on the week ending May 30, 2020.
^{J} The single re-entered the top ten on the week ending July 4, 2020.
^{K} The single re-entered the top ten on the week ending August 1, 2020.
^{L} The single re-entered the top ten on the week ending August 15, 2020.
^{M} The single re-entered the top ten on the week ending September 5, 2020.
^{N} The single re-entered the top ten on the week ending September 19, 2020.
^{O} The single re-entered the top ten on the week ending September 26, 2020.
^{P} The single re-entered the top ten on the week ending October 3, 2020.
^{Q} The single re-entered the top ten on the week ending October 24, 2020.
^{R} The single re-entered the top ten on the week ending October 31, 2020.
^{S} The single re-entered the top ten on the week ending November 21, 2020.
^{T} The single re-entered the top ten on the week ending December 5, 2020.
^{U} The single re-entered the top ten on the week ending December 12, 2020.
^{V} The single re-entered the top ten on the week ending December 19, 2020.
^{W} The single re-entered the top ten on the week ending December 26, 2020.

== Artists with most top-ten songs ==
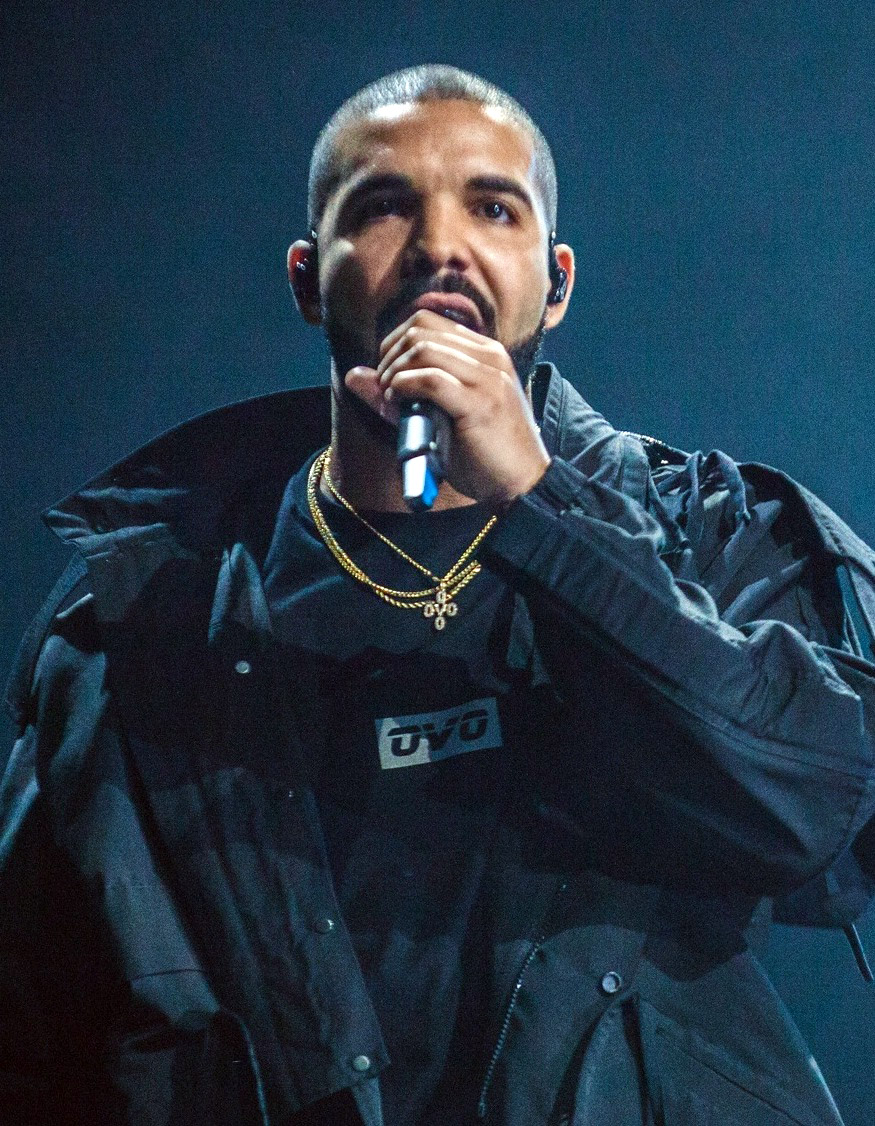
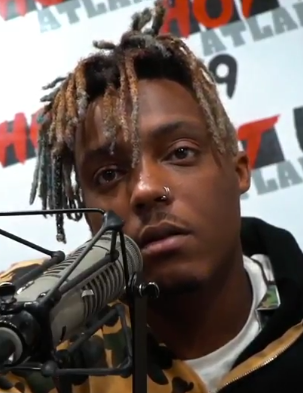
Drake (left) and Juice Wrld (right) are tied with the most top ten hits in 2020, with seven. Six of the latter's top ten hits are from his posthumously-released third studio album Legends Never Die, five of which made up half of the top 10 in the week dated July 25, 2020.

List of artists by total songs peaking in the top-ten
Artist	Numbers of songs
Drake	7
Juice Wrld	7
Justin Bieber	6
Ariana Grande	4
BTS	4
Taylor Swift	4
Billie Eilish	3
DaBaby	3
Lil Baby	3
Travis Scott	3
The Weeknd	3
Harry Styles	2
Lady Gaga	2
Lewis Capaldi	2
Marshmello	2
Megan Thee Stallion	2
Metro Boomin	2
Roddy Ricch	2
Young Thug	2
6ix9ine	2

== See also ==
- 2020 in American music
- List of Billboard Hot 100 number ones of 2020
- Billboard Year-End Hot 100 singles of 2020
