= List of top 10 singles for 2020 in Australia =

This is a list of singles that charted in the top ten of the ARIA Charts in 2020. In 2020, thirty-three acts reached the top ten for the first time.

== Top-ten singles ==
Key

Symbol	Meaning
◁	Indicates single's top 10 entry was also its ARIA top 50 debut
(#)	2020 Year-end top 10 single position and rank

List of ARIA top ten singles that peaked in 2020
Top ten entry date	Single	Artist(s)	Peak	Peak date	Weeks in top ten	References
Singles from 2019
23 December	"Blinding Lights" (#1) ^{[A]} ^{[N]} ^{[O]} ^{[R]} ^{[T]}	The Weeknd	1	27 January	40	
Singles from 2020
13 January	"Yummy" ◁ ^{[G]}	Justin Bieber	4	20 January	5	
20 January	"The Box"	Roddy Ricch	4	10 February	11	
27 January	"Godzilla" ◁	Eminem featuring Juice WRLD	3	27 January	4	
3 February	"Rushing Back"	Flume featuring Vera Blue	8	3 February	1	
10 February	"You Should Be Sad"	Halsey	4	16 March	8	
10 February	"Before You Go" (#8) ^{[I]}	Lewis Capaldi	7	2 March	5	
24 February	"Intentions" (#9)	Justin Bieber featuring Quavo	2	23 March	12	
24 February	"No Time to Die" ◁	Billie Eilish	4	24 February	2	
9 March	"Stupid Love" ◁	Lady Gaga	7	9 March	1	
9 March	"Say So" (#10)	Doja Cat	4	23 March	15	
23 March	"Roses" (#2) ^{[P]} ^{[Q]}	Saint Jhn	1	6 April	26	
23 March	"Supalonely" ^{[K]} ^{[L]}	Benee featuring Gus Dapperton	6	15 June	14	
30 March	"Death Bed"	Powfu featuring Beabadoobee	5	13 April	12	
6 April	"Break My Heart" ◁	Dua Lipa	7	6 April	5	
6 April	"Physical"	Dua Lipa	9	6 April	1	
13 April	"Toosie Slide" ◁	Drake	3	13 April	8	
20 April	"Sunday Best"	Surfaces	10	20 April	1	
4 May	"The Scotts" ◁	Travis Scott and Kid Cudi	4	4 May	2	
11 May	"Savage"	Megan Thee Stallion featuring Beyoncé	4	11 May	7	
11 May	"Rockstar" (#5)	DaBaby featuring Roddy Ricch	1	25 May	21	
18 May	"Stuck with U" ◁	Ariana Grande and Justin Bieber	3	18 May	6	
1 June	"Rain on Me" ◁	Lady Gaga and Ariana Grande	2	1 June	9	
8 June	"Breaking Me"	Topic and A7S	4	22 June	19	
8 June	"Sour Candy" ◁	Lady Gaga and Blackpink	8	8 June	1	
22 June	"Watermelon Sugar" (#6) ^{[O]}	Harry Styles	5	6 July	17	
22 June	"Rover"	S1mba featuring DTG	7	22 June	4	
29 June	"Savage Love (Laxed – Siren Beat)"	Jawsh 685 and Jason Derulo	1	6 July	19	
29 June	"Go Crazy"	Chris Brown and Young Thug	9	29 June	3	
6 July	"Whats Poppin" ^{[M]}	Jack Harlow	8	13 July	3	
20 July	"Come & Go" ◁ ^{[N]}	Juice Wrld and Marshmello	4	27 July	4	
20 July	"Life's a Mess" ◁	Juice Wrld and Halsey	8	20 July	1	
20 July	"Standing with You"	Guy Sebastian	10	20 July	1	
27 July	"Popstar" ◁	DJ Khaled featuring Drake	10	27 July	1	
3 August	"Cardigan" ◁	Taylor Swift	1	3 August	2	
3 August	"Exile" ◁	Taylor Swift featuring Bon Iver	3	3 August	2	
3 August	"The 1" ◁	Taylor Swift	4	3 August	1	
3 August	"The Last Great American Dynasty" ◁	Taylor Swift	7	3 August	1	
3 August	"My Tears Ricochet" ◁	Taylor Swift	8	3 August	1	
10 August	"My Future" ◁	Billie Eilish	3	10 August	1	
17 August	"WAP" ◁	Cardi B featuring Megan Thee Stallion	1	24 August	14	
17 August	"Smile" ◁	Juice WRLD and The Weeknd	8	17 August	1	
17 August	"Mood Swings"	Pop Smoke featuring Lil Tjay	5	7 September	6	
24 August	"Laugh Now Cry Later" ◁	Drake featuring Lil Durk	3	24 August	5	
24 August	"Head & Heart" ^{[V]}	Joel Corry featuring MNEK	2	26 October	26	
31 August	"Dynamite" ◁	BTS	2	31 August	1	
31 August	"Mood"	24kGoldn featuring Iann Dior	1	5 October	28	
28 September	"Holy" ◁	Justin Bieber featuring Chance the Rapper	4	28 September	11	
28 September	"One Too Many" ◁	Keith Urban and Pink	6	28 September	1	
28 September	"Lemonade"	Internet Money and Gunna featuring Don Toliver and Nav	5	9 November	9	
5 October	"You Broke Me First"	Tate McRae	7	23 November	11	
12 October	"Take You Dancing"	Jason Derulo	10	12 October	1	
19 October	"Dreams"	Fleetwood Mac	4	19 October	4	
19 October	"What You Know Bout Love"	Pop Smoke	5	16 November	7	
26 October	"Put Your Records On"	Ritt Momney	10	26 October	1	
2 November	"Positions" ◁	Ariana Grande	1	2 November	12	
16 November	"So Done" ^{[T]}	The Kid Laroi	6	23 November	13	
23 November	"Therefore I Am" ◁	Billie Eilish	3	23 November	5	
30 November	"Monster" ◁	Shawn Mendes & Justin Bieber	7	30 November	2	
7 December	"Midnight Sky"	Miley Cyrus	7	7 December	1	
21 December	"Willow" ◁	Taylor Swift	1	21 December	2	

=== 2019 peaks ===
List of ARIA top ten singles in 2020 that peaked in 2019
Top ten entry date	Single	Artist(s)	Peak	Peak date	Weeks in top ten	References
8 April	"Bad Guy" ◁ ^{[D]}	Billie Eilish	1	8 April	25	
15 July	"Dance Monkey" (#4) ^{[J]}	Tones and I	1	5 August	41	
9 September	"Circles" ◁ (#7)	Post Malone	2	16 September	28	
14 October	"Memories"	Maroon 5	2	18 November	16	
21 October	"Ride It"	Regard	3	11 November	14	
28 October	"Never Seen the Rain" ^{[C]}^{[F]}	Tones and I	7	16 December	14	
4 November	"Good as Hell" ^{[A]}^{[B]}	Lizzo	6	4 November	9	
11 November	"Don't Start Now" ◁ (#3)	Dua Lipa	2	16 December	29	
18 November	"Roxanne" ◁	Arizona Zervas	2	2 December	11	
25 November	"Everything I Wanted" ◁ ^{[E]}	Billie Eilish	2	25 November	6	
23 December	"Adore You" ^{[A]}^{[H]}	Harry Styles	7	23 December	7	

=== 2021 peaks ===
List of ARIA top ten singles in 2020 that peaked in 2021
Top ten entry date	Single	Artist(s)	Peak	Peak date	Weeks in top ten	References
9 November	"34+35" ◁ ^{[U]}	Ariana Grande	5	25 January	2	
16 November	"Levitating"	Dua Lipa	4	11 January	31	
14 December	"Without You" ◁	The Kid Laroi	1	10 May	29	

=== Holiday season ===
Holiday titles first making the ARIA Top 50 top ten during the 2020–21 holiday season
Top ten entry date	Single	Artist(s)	Peak	Peak date	Weeks in top ten	Ref.
28 December 2020	"Santa Tell Me"	Ariana Grande	5	3 January 2022	6	

Recurring holiday titles, appearing in the ARIA Top 50 top ten in previous holiday seasons
Top ten entry date	Single	Artist(s)	Peak	Peak date	Weeks in top ten	Ref.
1 January 2018	"All I Want for Christmas Is You"	Mariah Carey	1	31 December 2018	21	
31 December 2018	"Last Christmas" ^{[S]}	Wham!	2	28 December 2020	13	
30 December 2019	"It's Beginning to Look a Lot Like Christmas" ^{[S]}	Michael Buble	3	3 January 2022	8	

Notes:

^{A} The singles re-entered the top 10 on 6 January 2020.
^{B} The single re-entered the top 10 on 20 January 2020.
^{C} The single re-entered the top 10 on 27 January 2020.
^{D} The single re-entered the top 10 on 3 February 2020.
^{E} The single re-entered the top 10 on 10 February 2020.
^{F} The single re-entered the top 10 on 17 February 2020.
^{G} The single re-entered the top 10 on 24 February 2020.
^{H} The single re-entered the top 10 on 2 March 2020.
^{I} The single re-entered the top 10 on 16 March 2020.
^{J} The single re-entered the top 10 on 27 April 2020.
^{K} The single re-entered the top 10 on 18 May 2020.
^{L} The single re-entered the top 10 on 15 June 2020.
^{M} The single re-entered the top 10 on 27 July 2020.
^{N} The single re-entered the top 10 on 10 August 2020.
^{O} The single re-entered the top 10 on 7 September 2020.
^{P} The single re-entered the top 10 on 21 September 2020.
^{Q} The single re-entered the top 10 on 5 October 2020.
^{R} The single re-entered the top 10 on 14 December 2020.
^{S} The single re-entered the top 10 on 28 December 2020.
^{T} The single re-entered the top 10 on 4 January 2021.
^{U} The single re-entered the top 10 on 25 January 2021.
^{V} The single re-entered the top 10 on 15 February 2021.

== Entries by artist ==
The following table shows artists who achieved two or more top 10 entries in 2020, including songs that reached their peak in 2019. The figures include both main artists and featured artists.

Entries	Artist	Weeks	Songs
6	Taylor Swift	8	"Cardigan", "Exile", "The 1", "The Last Great American Dynasty", "My Tears Ricochet", "Willow"
5	Justin Bieber	33	"Intentions", "Yummy", "Stuck with U", "Holy", "Monster"
5	Ariana Grande	20	"Stuck With U", "Rain On Me", "Positions", "34+35", "Santa Tell Me"
5	Billie Eilish	11	"Bad Guy", "Everything I Wanted", "No Time to Die", "My Future", "Therefore I Am"
4	Dua Lipa	28	"Don't Start Now", "Physical", "Break My Heart", "Levitating"
4	Juice Wrld	9	"Godzilla", "Come & Go", "Life's a Mess", "Smile"
3	Drake	14	"Toosie Slide", "Popstar", "Laugh Now Cry Later"
3	Lady Gaga	10	"Stupid Love", "Rain On Me", "Sour Candy"
2	The Weeknd	39	"Blinding Lights", "Smile"
2	Roddy Ricch	32	"The Box", "Rockstar"
2	Harry Styles	23	"Adore You", "Watermelon Sugar"
2	Megan Thee Stallion	21	"Savage", "WAP"
2	Jason Derulo	20	"Savage Love (Laxed – Siren Beat)", "Take You Dancing"
2	Tones and I	16	"Dance Monkey", "Never Seen the Rain"
2	Pop Smoke	13	"Mood Swings", "What You Know Bout Love"
2	Halsey	9	"You Should Be Sad", "Life's a Mess"
2	The Kid Laroi	8	"So Done", "Without You"

== See also ==
- 2020 in music
- ARIA Charts
- List of number-one singles of 2020 (Australia)
- List of top 10 albums in 2020 (Australia)
