= Bad Boy (Juice Wrld and Young Thug song) =

2021 single by Juice Wrld and Young Thug

Single by Juice Wrld and Young Thug
- Released: January 15, 2021
- Recorded: 2019
- Genre: Melodic trap, emo rap
- Length: 2:37
- Label: Grade A Production; Interscope
- Songwriters: Jarad Higgins; Jeffery Williams; Jordan Jenks
- Producer: Pi'erre Bourne

Juice Wrld singles chronology
"Reminds Me of You" (2020)	"Bad Boy" (2021)	"Life's a Mess II" (2021)

Young Thug singles chronology
"Talk About Love" (2021)	"Bad Boy" (2021)	"That Go!" (2021)

Music video
- "Bad Boy" on YouTube

"Bad Boy" is a song by American rappers Juice Wrld and Young Thug. It was released via Grade A Productions through exclusive licensing to Interscope Records on January 15, 2021. The two artists wrote the song along with its sole producer, Pi'erre Bourne.

== Background ==
In November 2019, Juice Wrld posted via Instagram, with the caption "Great things coming". Scenes with frequent music video collaborator Cole Bennett and Young Thug were revealed as well.

On December 25, 2020, Bennett revealed, after much anticipation, that "Bad Boy" and its supported visuals would be released on January 15, 2021. He also revealed that it was the final filmed collaboration between himself and Juice Wrld.

The song was released on January 15, 2021, and it marks the rappers' fourth official collaboration. The song is also the first official collaboration between Juice Wrld and Pi'erre Bourne.

== Composition ==
On the track, Juice Wrld and Young Thug rap about their reckless lifestyles and liken themselves to Will Smith and Martin Lawrence, the main cast of the 1995 comedy film, Bad Boys.

== Music video ==
The music video, directed by Cole Bennett, released on January 15, 2021, coincided with the release of "Bad Boy". It marks the final music video filmed with Higgins, as well as the eighth (tenth counting "Tell Me U Luv Me" with Trippie Redd), which uses archival footage of Higgins and marks the final music video collaboration between Higgins and Bennett. The music video was filmed on Chicago's west side on October 25, 2019, just a little over a month before Juice WRLD's death in December 2019.

== Credits and personnel ==
Credits adapted from Tidal.

- Jarad Higgins – vocals, songwriting, composition
- Jeffery Williams – vocals, songwriting, composition
- Pi'erre Bourne – songwriting, composition, production
- A "Bainz" Bains – studio personnel, engineering
- Max Lord – studio personnel, engineering, mixing
- Simon Alex – studio personnel, mixing
- Ben Lidsky – studio personnel, assistant mixer
- Colin Leonard – studio personnel, mastering

== Charts ==
Chart performance for "Bad Boy"
Chart (2021)	Peak position
Australia (ARIA)	55
Austria (Ö3 Austria Top 40)	73
Global 200 (Billboard)	19
Canada Hot 100 (Billboard)	13
Greece (IFPI)	79
Hungary (Stream Top 40)	40
Ireland (IRMA)	26
Lithuania (AGATA)	25
Netherlands (Single Top 100)	91
New Zealand Hot Singles (RMNZ)	3
Portugal (AFP)	75
Sweden Heatseeker (Sverigetopplistan)	1
Switzerland (Schweizer Hitparade)	88
UK Singles (Official Charts)	31
UK Hip Hop/R&B (Official Charts)	11
US Billboard Hot 100	22
US Hot R&B/Hip-Hop Songs (Billboard)	9
US Rhythmic Airplay (Billboard)	31
US Rolling Stone Top 100	5

== Certifications ==
Region	Certification	Certified units/sales
Canada (Music Canada)	Gold	40,000^{‡}
^{‡} Sales+streaming figures based on certification alone.
