= Come & Go (song) =

2020 song by Juice Wrld & Marshmello

Single by Juice Wrld and Marshmello

from the album Legends Never Die
- Released: July 9, 2020
- Recorded: 2018
- Genre: Emo rap; EDM; pop punk
- Length: 3:25
- Label: Grade A; Interscope; Joytime Collective; Geffen
- Songwriters: Jarad Higgins; Marshmello
- Producer: Marshmello

Juice Wrld singles chronology
"Life's a Mess" (2020)	"Come & Go" (2020)	"Wishing Well" (2020)

Marshmello singles chronology
"Be Kind" (2020)	"Come & Go" (2020)	"Baggin'" (2020)

Music video
- "Come & Go" on YouTube

"Come & Go" is a song by American rapper Juice Wrld and American DJ and producer Marshmello. It was released on July 9, 2020, as the fourth single from Juice Wrld's posthumous third studio album, Legends Never Die. It debuted at number two on the Billboard Hot 100, respectively matching "Lucid Dreams" and "Happier" (with Bastille) as the artists' highest-charting song.

== Background ==
A rough demo of the song was teased by Juice in 2018. The track then leaked with the numerous demos for tracks in January 2020 along with "Righteous" and "Tell Me U Luv Me".

Shortly before release of the song, Marshmello took to Twitter to talk about his relationship with Higgins, saying that the rapper was "one of the most talented people I have ever met" and how they were both "constantly on the same page when it came to music".

== Critical reception ==
Jon Blistein of Rolling Stone concluded that the "track finds Juice Wrld striving to be a better man over an atmospheric guitar loop that's soon pushed toward the edge by thumping drums", while sonically, Juice Wrld blends "his pop-punk inflected hip hop with Marshmello's big tent EDM". According to Aleia Woods of XXL, the song "has a punk-rock and EDM feel with heavy guitar strums". The Fader's Jordan Darville felt that the song "is an attempt to make good on Juice WRLD's promise of global pop stardom, tragically unfulfilled by his death at age 21 of an accidental drug overdose". Lyrically, Jon Powell of Revolt thought the song saw "the late rapper speaking on his insecurities to his significant other" with lines like "I try to be everything that I can, but sometimes, I come out as bein' nothin'".

== Credits and personnel ==
Credits adapted from Tidal.

- Jarad Higgins – vocalist, song, composition
- Marshmello – song, compositions, producer
- Chris Galland – mixing assistant
- Jeremie Inhaber – mixing assistant
- Robin Florent – mix assistant
- Max Lord – engineer
- Tatsuya Sato – mastered engineering
- Manny Marroquin – mixing

== Charts ==
=== Weekly charts ===
Weekly chart performance for "Come & Go"
Chart (2020–2021)	Peak position
Australia (ARIA)	4
Australia Urban (ARIA)	3
Austria (Ö3 Austria Top 40)	15
Belgium (Ultratop 50 Flanders)	47
Belgium (Ultratip Bubbling Under Wallonia)	13
Global 200 (Billboard)	26
Canada Hot 100 (Billboard)	4
Canada CHR/Top 40 (Billboard)	19
Canada Hot AC (Billboard)	38
Czech Republic Singles Digital (ČNS IFPI)	12
Denmark (Tracklisten)	15
Finland (Suomen virallinen lista)	18
France (SNEP)	146
Germany (GfK)	38
Greece (IFPI)	22
Hungary (Stream Top 40)	14
Iceland (Tónlistinn)	23
Ireland (IRMA)	6
Italy (FIMI)	94
Lithuania (AGATA)	24
Netherlands (Single Top 100)	27
New Zealand (Recorded Music NZ)	8
Norway (VG-lista)	9
Portugal (AFP)	46
Scottish Singles Sales (Official Charts)	52
Singapore (RIAS)	18
Slovakia Singles Digital (ČNS IFPI)	40
Sweden (Sverigetopplistan)	7
Switzerland (Schweizer Hitparade)	21
UK Singles (Official Charts)	9
US Billboard Hot 100	2
US Adult Pop Airplay (Billboard)	31
US Hot Rock & Alternative Songs (Billboard)	1
US Pop Airplay (Billboard)	10
US Rhythmic Airplay (Billboard)	30
US Rock & Alternative Airplay (Billboard)	8
US Rolling Stone Top 100	1

=== Year-end charts ===
2020 year-end chart performance for "Come & Go"
Chart (2020)	Position
Australia (ARIA)	74
Austria (Ö3 Austria Top 40)	41
Canada (Canadian Hot 100)	60
Hungary (Stream Top 40)	74
Ireland (IRMA)	50
US Billboard Hot 100	54
US Hot Rock & Alternative Songs (Billboard)	2
US Mainstream Top 40 (Billboard)	35

2021 year-end chart performance for "Come & Go"
Chart (2021)	Position
US Hot Rock & Alternative Songs (Billboard)	16

== Certifications ==
Certifications and sales for "Come & Go"
Region	Certification	Certified units/sales
Australia (ARIA)	2× Platinum	140,000^{‡}
Austria (IFPI Austria)	Gold	15,000^{‡}
Brazil (Pro-Música Brasil)	2× Platinum	80,000^{‡}
Canada (Music Canada)	3× Platinum	240,000^{‡}
Denmark (IFPI Danmark)	Platinum	90,000^{‡}
Germany (BVMI)	Gold	200,000^{‡}
Italy (FIMI)	Gold	35,000^{‡}
New Zealand (RMNZ)	2× Platinum	60,000^{‡}
Poland (ZPAV)	Gold	25,000^{‡}
Portugal (AFP)	Gold	5,000^{‡}
United Kingdom (BPI)	Platinum	600,000^{‡}
United States (RIAA)	3× Platinum	3,000,000^{‡}
^{‡} Sales+streaming figures based on certification alone.
