= Pegasus (Trippie Redd album) =

Studio album by Trippie Redd
- Released: October 30, 2020
- Recorded: 2017–2020
- Genres: Emo rap; trap
- Length: 74:11
- Labels: 10K Projects; Caroline; 1400 Entertainment
- Producers: OZ; Nik D; Oscar Zulu; LVNDVN; Hammad Beats; Quintin Gulledge; Frano; Burnley AKL; Stoopid Lou; Deats; Goose the Guru; LASTNGHT; Dinuzzo; Loaded; ChaseTheMoney; Heavy Mellow; Starboy; RIP; Psymun; Distance Decay; ATL Jacob; J.U.S.T.I.C.E. League; Mally Mall; 1993; Eesean Bolden; Lateef Garrett; ChopSquad DJ; RMG Nu; FaatKiid; Xeryus; Wheezy; Rance; Khyrie Taylor; Sean Momberger; LNK; Mario Petersen; Nick Mira; Outtatown; CBMix; Cardiak; Scott Storch; Avedon; Angel Lopez; David Morse; KC Supreme; Igor Mamet; Nadddot; Trippie Redd

Trippie Redd chronology
A Love Letter to You 4 (2019)	Pegasus (2020)	Neon Shark vs Pegasus (2021)

Singles from Pegasus
- 1. "Excitement" Released: May 15, 2020; 2. "Dreamer" Released: June 18, 2020; 3. "I Got You" Released: September 11, 2020; 4. "Sleepy Hollow" Released: October 7, 2020

Pegasus is the third studio album by American rapper Trippie Redd, released on October 30, 2020. The album features guest appearances from Myiah Lynnae, Yung LB, PartyNextDoor, Chris Brown, Rich the Kid, Young Thug, Future, Lil Mosey, Quavo, Busta Rhymes, Sean Kingston, Doe Boy, Lil Wayne, HoodyBaby, and Swae Lee. The deluxe version titled Neon Shark vs Pegasus made in collaboration with Travis Barker was released on February 19, 2021, featuring Machine Gun Kelly, blackbear, Chino Moreno, Scarlxrd, and ZillaKami.

The album debuted at number two on the US Billboard 200 chart, earning 60,000 album-equivalent units in its first week.

== Background ==
The album was announced by Redd in March 2020 via his Instagram story with the caption reading "PEGASUS, the album. One day". Redd said that the album would take a "dreamy, nostalgic and outer space" approach this time around. Later in June 2020, Redd had announced a deluxe version for the album, and that it would be his rock project that he teased in March 2019, and gave more information about the upcoming album on an Instagram live stream. He stated that the songs on the album would be put in a specific order as his previous project A Love Letter to You 4, with love songs being first, deep in the middle, and hard songs last. He said Pegasus would "be way better" than A Love Letter to You 4, and that "it takes you from place to place as far as genre goes. The whole goal with that was... I was thinking next level".

In April 2020, Redd stated: "The direction on the album is supposed to feel mystical. Like dreamy, nostalgic, outer space. Everything is gonna feel like some off-the-wall fairy tale type shit. For example, I got songs on there called "Pink Pixie Dust", a self-titled song "Pegasus", a song named "Fairy Tales", a song named "The Milky Way". It's all going in that direction. "Love Scars 4" will be on this album too."

On August 18, 2020, the full album leaked after Redd had stated that he would delay the album further if more of his music continued to leak online. According to an interview with Redd's labelmate, rapper 6ix9ine, Pegasus was pushed back for months by Redd's label who felt that a new project from Redd would not gain enough traction to be financially viable.

On February 19, 2021, the collaborative deluxe project with Travis Barker titled Neon Shark vs Pegasus was released featuring 14 new songs including the 2020 single "Dreamer" and various collaborations with singer Machine Gun Kelly. Prior to the album's official release, the deluxe version was accidentally leaked on the streaming service Tidal, before being taken down minutes later.

== Singles ==
The lead single, "Excitement", with Canadian singer and rapper PartyNextDoor, was released on May 15, 2020.

On September 11, 2020, the album's second single, "I Got You", featuring American rapper Busta Rhymes, was released aside the official music video.

On October 7, 2020, "Sleepy Hollow" was released as the album's third single, while the album's tracklist and release date was also revealed.

== Critical reception ==
Professional ratings
Review scores
Source	Rating
AllMusic	2.5/5 stars
NME	3/5 stars
Pitchfork	5.6/10

Pitchfork said that the album "sounds like a randomly generated playlist: tons of options, very little soul". Minnesota Daily criticized its lyrical content saying: "Lyrically, this album is nothing special. What few lyrics you are able to pick out are either generic or completely overdone".

== Commercial performance ==
Pegasus debuted at number two on the US Billboard 200 chart, earning 60,000 album-equivalent units, (including 4,000 copies as pure album sales) in its first week. This became Trippie Redd's fifth US top-five debut on the chart, following the release of his chart-topping project, A Love Letter to You 4. The album also accumulated a total of 79.2 million on-demand streams from the album's songs that week.

== Cover artwork ==
The cover art was revealed on October 1, 2020, on Trippie Redd's Instagram, and shows him wearing nude-colored underwear, with his arms flailed out in front of a Pegasus horse from Greek mythology. The artwork received mixed reception from fans, with Redd later deleting the picture.

== Track listing ==
Pegasus – Standard edition
No.	Title	Writer(s)	Producer(s)	Length
1.	"Let It Out" (featuring Myiah Lynnae)	Michael White IV; Myiah Lynnae; Ozan Yildrim; Oliver Carnival; Nicholas Frascona	OZ; Nik D^{[a]}; Oscar Zulu^{[a]}; LVNDVN^{[a]}	2:56
2.	"Moonlight"	White; Adrian "Hammad Beats" Rupke; Quintin Gulledge; Joe Talamo	Hammad Beats; Gulledge; Oscar Zulu^{[a]}	2:41
3.	"Love Scars 4"	White; Rupke; Talamo	Hammad Beats; Oscar Zulu^{[a]}	2:36
4.	"The Nether"	White; Yildrim; Frano Huett; Jordan Lusitini	OZ; Frano; Burnley AKL^{[a]}	2:37
5.	"So Stressed" (featuring Yung LB)	White; Fetaiaki "Yung LB" Teaupa; Rupke	Hammad Beats; Stoopid Lou^{[a]}; Oscar Zulu^{[a]}	3:24
6.	"Excitement" (with PartyNextDoor)	White; Jahron Brathwaite; Yildrim; Nik "D" Frascona; Dominik "Deats" Patrzek	OZ; Nik D; Deats	4:43
7.	"Mood" (featuring Chris Brown)	White; Christopher Brown; Nickalas "Goose the Guru" Turner; Kyle "LASTNGHT" Edwards; Darien "Dinuzzo" Overton	Goose the Guru; LASTNGHT; Dinuzzo	2:23
8.	"Pegasus"	White; Rupke	Hammad Beats; Oscar Zulu^{[a]}	2:17
9.	"Weeeeee"	White; Kamil "Loaded" Budek	Loaded	2:32
10.	"Personal Favorite" (featuring Rich the Kid)	White; Dimitri Roger; Chase "TheMoney" Rose; Everett "Heavy Mellow" Romano	ChaseTheMoney; Heavy Mellow	2:35
11.	"V-12"	White; Anton "Starboy" Mendo	Starboy; RIP; Psymun; Distance Decay	2:06
12.	"Spaceships" (featuring Young Thug)	White; Jeffery Williams; Jacob "ATL Jacob" Canady	ATL Jacob	2:54
13.	"Never Change" (featuring Future)	White; Nayvadius Wilburn; Jamal "Mally Mall" Rashid; Erik Ortiz; Kevin Crowe; Kenneth Bartolomei; Overton; 1993; Eesean Bolden; Edwards; Lateef Garrett; Larrance "Rance" Dopson; Khirye Tyler; Stefan Schecter; Don Gerard Di Napoli, Jr.; Zachary Gorrin	Mally Mall; J.U.S.T.I.C.E. League; Dinuzzo; 1993; Bolden; LASTNGHT; Garrett; Rance; Tyler	2:53
14.	"Good Morning"	White; Darrell "ChopSquad DJ" Jackson	ChopSquad DJ	3:21
15.	"No Honorable Mention" (with Lil Mosey featuring Quavo)	White; Lathan Echols; Quavious Marshall; Jackson	ChopSquad DJ; RMG Nu^{[a]}; FaatKiid^{[a]}; Xeryus^{[a]}	4:18
16.	"I Got You" (with Busta Rhymes)	White; Trevor Smith, Jr.; Wesley Glass; Sean Momberger; Roger McNair; Rashia Fisher; William Lewis; Leroy Jones	Wheezy; Momberger; Rance^{[a]}; Taylor^{[a]}	3:05
17.	"Too Fly"	White; Rupke	Hammad Beats; LNK^{[a]}; Mario Petersen^{[a]}	3:04
18.	"Red Beam" (featuring Sean Kingston)	White; Kisean Anderson; Yildrim	OZ; Deats^{[a]}; Nik D^{[a]}	2:07
19.	"Oomps Revenge, Pt. 2"	White; Rupke	Hammad Beats; Oscar Zulu^{[a]}	1:57
20.	"Take One"	White; Nicholas Mira	Nick Mira	2:01
21.	"Sleepy Hollow"	White; Tobias "Outtatown" Dekker	Outtatown	1:41
22.	"Kid That Didd" (featuring Future and Doe Boy)	White; Wilburn; Isam "Doe Boy" Mostafa; Jackson; Christopher "CBMix" Barnett	ChopSquad DJ; CBMix	3:37
23.	"Don"	White; Jackson	ChopSquad DJ	2:24
24.	"Hell Rain" (featuring Lil Wayne and HoodyBaby)	White; Dwayne Carter, Jr.; Omolulu "HoodyBaby" Akinlolu; Carl McCormick	Cardiak	3:47
25.	"TR666" (featuring Swae Lee)	White; Khalif Brown; Scott Storch; Vincent van den Ende	Storch; Avedon	3:00
26.	"Sun God" (featuring Myiah Lynnae)	White; Lynnae; Jose "Angel Lopez" Velazquez	Angel Lopez	3:12
Total length:				74:11

Target Exclusive Edition
No.	Title	Writer(s)	Producer(s)	Length
27.	"Where You Goin"	White; David Morse; Kim Candilora	David Morse; KC Supreme	1:55
28.	"Lighting"	White; Igor Mamet; Andreas Matura	Igor Mamet; Nadddot	2:40

Pegasus: Neon Shark vs. Pegasus Presented By Travis Barker (Deluxe)
No.	Title	Writer(s)	Producer(s)	Length
27.	"Pill Breaker" (featuring Machine Gun Kelly and Blackbear)	White; Colson Baker; Matthew Musto; Travis Barker; Andrew Goldstein; Matt Malpass	Barker	2:57
28.	"Without You"	White; Barker; Nick Long; Carron R.	Barker; Long	3:09
29.	"Swimming"	White; Barker; Will Swan	Barker	2:15
30.	"Female Shark"	White; Barker	Barker	2:43
31.	"Geronimo" (featuring Chino Moreno)	White; Chino Moreno; Barker; Long	Barker; Long	2:59
32.	"Sea World"	White; Barker; Malpass	Barker	2:36
33.	"Red Sky" (featuring Machine Gun Kelly)	White; Baker; Barker; Carron R.John Feldmann	Barker; Feldmann	2:32
34.	"Megladon"	White; Barker; Malpass	Barker	3:14
35.	"Save Yourself"	White; Barker; Carron R.; Feldmann	Barker; Feldmann	2:40
36.	"Dreamer"	White; Francis "Yeezo" Palladino	Yeezo	2:50
37.	"It's Coming"	White; Barker; Malpass	Barker	2:34
38.	"Leaders"	White; Barker; Federico Vindver; Jared "Pearl Lion" Scharff; Jose "Angel Lopez" Velazquez	Barker; Vindver; Pearl Lion; Angel Lopez	2:40
39.	"Frozen Ocean"	White; Barker; Malpass	Barker	3:24
40.	"Dead Desert" (featuring Scarlxrd and ZillaKami)	White; Marius Listhrop; Junius Rogers; Barker; Malpass	Barker	2:41

Pegasus – Spooky Sounds edition
No.	Title	Writer(s)	Producer(s)	Length
1.	"Woooo"	White	Trippie Redd	1:04
2.	"Pegasus Coming"	White	Trippie Redd	1:12
3.	"Laugh"	White	Trippie Redd	1:03
4.	"Growl"	White	Trippie Redd	1:05
5.	"Door + Laugh"	White	Trippie Redd	1:03
6.	"Breathes"	White	Trippie Redd	1:02
Total length:				80:30

Notes

- ^{^[a]} signifies an uncredited additional producer
- "TR666" was initially released on December 26, 2017.
- All songs on the deluxe stylized in all caps.
- All songs on the deluxe are with Travis Barker, except "Dreamer".

Sample credits

- "TR666" contains a sample of "A Garden of Peace" performed by Lonnie Liston Smith.
- "I Got You" interpolates "I Know What You Want" performed by Busta Rhymes and Mariah Carey.

== Charts ==
=== Weekly charts ===
Weekly chart performance for Pegasus
Chart (2020–2021)	Peak position
Australian Albums (ARIA)	60
Belgian Albums (Ultratop Flanders)	60
Belgian Albums (Ultratop Wallonia)	89
Canadian Albums (Billboard)	6
Dutch Albums (Album Top 100)	44
French Albums (SNEP)	50
Irish Albums (Official Charts)	36
Lithuanian Albums (AGATA)	66
New Zealand Albums (RMNZ)	32
Norwegian Albums (VG-lista)	14
Swiss Albums (Schweizer Hitparade)	56
UK Albums (Official Charts)	79
US Billboard 200	2
US Top R&B/Hip-Hop Albums (Billboard)	1

=== Year-end charts ===
Year-end chart performance for Pegasus
Chart (2021)	Position
US Top R&B/Hip-Hop Albums (Billboard)	85

== Certifications ==
Region	Certification	Certified units/sales
United States (RIAA)	Gold	500,000^{‡}
^{‡} Sales+streaming figures based on certification alone.
