= Excitement (song) =

2020 single by Trippie Redd and PartyNextDoor

Single by Trippie Redd and PartyNextDoor

from the album Pegasus
- Released: May 15, 2020
- Genre: R&B
- Length: 4:44
- Label: TenThousand Projects
- Songwriters: Michael Lamar White IV; Jahron Anthony Brathwaite; Ozan Yildirim; Nik Dejan Frascona; Dominik Patrzek
- Producers: Oz, Nik D, Deats

Trippie Redd singles chronology
"Hello Kitty" (2020)	"Excitement" (2020)	"Tell Me U Luv Me" (2020)

PartyNextDoor singles chronology
"Friends" (2020)	"Excitement" (2020)	"My Affection" (2020)

Music video
- "Excitement" on YouTube

"Excitement" is a song by American rapper Trippie Redd and Canadian singer PartyNextDoor, released as the lead single from the former's third studio album Pegasus (2020). Released on May 15, 2020, the track was released under Trippie Redd's labels 1400 Entertainment and 10K Projects. The track went viral on the popular social media app TikTok.

== Background ==
Trippie first previewed the song with a short video on his Instagram on April 4, 2020, captioning the post: “🎠 @partynextdoor.” Trippie previewed a longer high-quality portion of the track on April 20, confirming its title in the post's caption.

== Charts ==
Chart (2020)	Peak position
US Bubbling Under Hot 100 (Billboard)	2

== Music video ==
The music video premiered on May 15, 2020, and was directed by Aidan Cullen.

== Certifications ==
Region	Certification	Certified units/sales
Brazil (Pro-Música Brasil)	Gold	20,000^{‡}
Canada (Music Canada)	Platinum	80,000^{‡}
New Zealand (RMNZ)	Platinum	30,000^{‡}
United States (RIAA)	Platinum	1,000,000^{‡}
^{‡} Sales+streaming figures based on certification alone.
