= Weeeeee =

2020 song by Trippie Redd

Song by Trippie Redd

from the album Pegasus
- Released: October 30, 2020
- Genre: Trap
- Length: 2:33
- Label: TenThousand Projects
- Songwriters: Michael White IV; Loaded
- Producer: Loaded

Music video
- "Weeeeee" on YouTube

"Weeeeee" is a song by American rapper Trippie Redd from his third studio album Pegasus. It was released on October 30, 2020. The song was produced by Loaded. It went viral on TikTok and peaked at number 80 on the Billboard Hot 100.

== Music video ==
The music video was released on November 13, 2020, and was directed by Aidan Cullen and Jimmy Regular.

== Credits and personnel ==
- Trippie Redd – vocals, songwriting
- Loaded – production, songwriting
- LenoxBeatmaker – production
- Igor Mamet – mastering, mixing, recording
- Dylan Del-Olmo – mixing

== Charts ==
Chart (2020)	Peak position
US Billboard Hot 100	80

== Certifications ==
Region	Certification	Certified units/sales
United States (RIAA)	Gold	500,000^{‡}
^{‡} Sales+streaming figures based on certification alone.
