= Be Kind =

2020 single by Marshmello and Halsey

Single by Marshmello and Halsey
- Released: May 1, 2020
- Genre: EDM
- Length: 2:52
- Label: Joytime Collective; Astralwerks; Capitol
- Songwriters: Christopher Comstock; Ashley Frangipane; Miles Ale; Amy Allen; Freddy Wexler; Gian Stone
- Producers: Marshmello; Miles Ale; Gian Stone

Marshmello singles chronology
| "Been Thru This Before" (2020) | "Be Kind" (2020) | "Come & Go" (2020) |

Halsey singles chronology
| "The Other Girl" (2020) | "Be Kind" (2020) | "Life's a Mess" (2020) |

Music video
- "Be Kind" on YouTube

"Be Kind" is a song by American producer Marshmello and American singer Halsey. It was released as a single through Joytime Collective, Astralwerks, and Capitol Records on May 1, 2020. "Be Kind" peaked at number 29 on the Billboard Hot 100. Outside of the United States, "Be Kind" peaked within the top 10 of the charts in Malaysia and Singapore and within the top 20 in Australia, Canada, and Lithuania, as well as the top 40 of the charts in the Czech Republic, Estonia, Hungary, the Netherlands, New Zealand, Norway, the Republic of Ireland, and the United Kingdom. The song appears on Halsey's eighth extended play (EP) and first compilation EP, Collabs (2020) and the deluxe version of her third studio album, Manic (2020).

== Background and promotion ==
Marshmello and Halsey indirectly came out announcing a collaboration on April 29, 2020, through their social media by posting a flower visual each and the caption "friday". The two musicians went on to reveal the song title and cover art, a painting of a flower with a pink sticker, a day later through their social media.

== Composition ==
Musically, "Be Kind" is an "emotional" EDM song that sees Marshmello and Halsey "[exploring] trust issues and [reinforcing] that it's OK to be vulnerable with someone you love." In terms of music notation, "Be Kind" was composed using 4/4 common time in the key of E major, with a tempo of 94 beats per minute. Halsey's vocal range spans from the low note F♯3 to the high note of C♯5.

== Music video ==
A music video was released on YouTube on June 27, 2020. It was directed by Hannah Lux Davis. The video begins with Halsey sitting in a chair and dancing around a large grey room. Later she appears dancing in a seemingly digital utopia full of flowers and sakura trees. At the end of the video, she awakens back in the grey room where she attempts to communicate with Marshmello, who is seen on a small screen directly in front of her. As of August 2026, the video has over 137 million views.

== Remixes ==
A remix of the song by fellow DJ Surf Mesa was released on June 17, 2020. Another remix of the song by DJ Jacques Lu Cont was released on June 26, 2020. A third remix of the song by the DJ trio Joy Club was released on July 10, 2020. A fourth remix of the song by upcoming DJ BLVD was released on the same day as the Joy Club remix for free download.

== Personnel ==
Credits adapted from Tidal.

- Marshmello – songwriting, composition, production, programming
- Ashley Frangipane – vocals, songwriting, composition
- Gian Stone – songwriting, composition, production, additional producer, programming
- Amy Allen – songwriting, composition
- Freddy Wexler – songwriting, composition
- Aria McKnight – A&R
- Jeremy Vuernick – A&R
- Elizabeth Isik – A&R administration
- Brandon Buttner – engineering, vocal production, studio personnel
- Michelle Mansini – master engineering, studio personnel
- John Hanes – mixing engineering, studio personnel
- Serban Ghenea – mixing, studio personnel

== Charts ==
=== Weekly charts ===
| Chart (2020) | Peak position |
|---|---|
| Australia (ARIA) | 15 |
| Austria (Ö3 Austria Top 40) | 33 |
| Belgium (Ultratip Bubbling Under Flanders) | 1 |
| Belgium (Ultratip Bubbling Under Wallonia) | 4 |
| Brazil (Top 100 Brasil) | 53 |
| Canada Hot 100 (Billboard) | 18 |
| Canada CHR/Top 40 (Billboard) | 10 |
| Canada AC (Billboard) | 42 |
| Canada Hot AC (Billboard) | 13 |
| Czech Republic Airplay (ČNS IFPI) | 1 |
| Czech Republic Singles Digital (ČNS IFPI) | 34 |
| Estonia (Eesti Ekspress) | 26 |
| Germany (GfK) | 54 |
| Global 200 (Billboard) | 84 |
| Hungary (Rádiós Top 40) | 2 |
| Hungary (Single Top 40) | 17 |
| Hungary (Stream Top 40) | 22 |
| Ireland (IRMA) | 22 |
| Italy (FIMI) | 72 |
| Japan Hot 100 (Billboard) | 74 |
| Lithuania (AGATA) | 19 |
| Malaysia (RIM) | 4 |
| Netherlands (Dutch Top 40) | 13 |
| Netherlands (Single Top 100) | 34 |
| New Zealand (Recorded Music NZ) | 32 |
| Norway (VG-lista) | 29 |
| Panama (PRODUCE) | 32 |
| Portugal (AFP) | 60 |
| Romania (Airplay 100) | 36 |
| San Marino (SMRRTV Top 50) | 21 |
| Scottish Singles Sales (Official Charts) | 18 |
| Singapore (RIAS) | 3 |
| Slovakia Airplay (ČNS IFPI) | 39 |
| Slovakia Singles Digital (ČNS IFPI) | 45 |
| Slovenia (SloTop50) | 28 |
| Sweden (Sverigetopplistan) | 48 |
| Switzerland (Schweizer Hitparade) | 46 |
| UK Singles (Official Charts) | 33 |
| US Billboard Hot 100 | 29 |
| US Adult Pop Airplay (Billboard) | 17 |
| US Dance Airplay (Billboard) | 3 |
| US Pop Airplay (Billboard) | 15 |
| US Rolling Stone Top 100 | 22 |

=== Year-end charts ===
| Chart (2020) | Position |
|---|---|
| Australia (ARIA) | 64 |
| Canada (Canadian Hot 100) | 61 |
| Hungary (Rádiós Top 40) | 47 |
| Netherlands (Dutch Top 40) | 87 |
| US Dance/Mix Show Airplay (Billboard) | 15 |

| Chart (2021) | Position |
|---|---|
| Hungary (Rádiós Top 40) | 59 |

== Certifications ==
| Region | Certification | Certified units/sales |
|---|---|---|
| Australia (ARIA) | Platinum | 70,000^{‡} |
| Austria (IFPI Austria) | Gold | 15,000^{‡} |
| Brazil (Pro-Música Brasil) | Diamond | 160,000^{‡} |
| Canada (Music Canada) | 3× Platinum | 240,000^{‡} |
| Denmark (IFPI Danmark) | Gold | 45,000^{‡} |
| France (SNEP) | Gold | 100,000^{‡} |
| Italy (FIMI) | Platinum | 70,000^{‡} |
| Mexico (AMPROFON) | Gold | 30,000^{‡} |
| New Zealand (RMNZ) | 2× Platinum | 60,000^{‡} |
| Norway (IFPI Norway) | Gold | 30,000^{‡} |
| Poland (ZPAV) | 2× Platinum | 100,000^{‡} |
| Portugal (AFP) | Gold | 5,000^{‡} |
| Spain (Promusicae) | Gold | 30,000^{‡} |
| United Kingdom (BPI) | Gold | 400,000^{‡} |
| United States (RIAA) | 2× Platinum | 2,000,000^{‡} |
^{‡} Sales+streaming figures based on certification alone.

== Release history ==
| Region | Date | Format | Label | Ref. |
|---|---|---|---|---|
| Various | May 1, 2020 | Digital download; streaming | Joytime Collective; Astralwerks; Capitol | |
| Australia | May 1, 2020 | Contemporary hit radio | Capitol | |
| United States | May 5, 2020 | Contemporary hit radio | Astralwerks; Capitol | |
| Italy | May 8, 2020 | Contemporary hit radio | Universal | |
| United States | June 1, 2020 | Hot adult contemporary | Astralwerks; Capitol | |
