= Willow (song) =

2020 single by Taylor Swift

Single by Taylor Swift

from the album Evermore
- Written: 2020
- Released: December 11, 2020
- Recorded: 2020
- Studio: Long Pond (Hudson Valley)
- Genre: Chamber folk
- Length: 3:34
- Label: Republic
- Songwriters: Taylor Swift; Aaron Dessner
- Producer: Aaron Dessner

Taylor Swift singles chronology
"Betty" (2020)	"Willow" (2020)	"No Body, No Crime" (2021)

Music video
- "Willow" on YouTube

"Willow" (stylized in all lowercase) is a song by the American singer-songwriter Taylor Swift from her ninth studio album, Evermore (2020). It was released on December 11, 2020, by Republic Records as the lead single from the album. "Willow" is a chamber folk love song making use of several metaphors to convey Swift's romantic state of mind, such as portraying her life as a willow tree, over picked guitars, glockenspiel, flute, strings, and percussion.

Swift penned the song's lyrics upon hearing an instrumental composition by the song's producer Aaron Dessner. She compared the song's overarching motif to casting a love spell. An accompanying music video, directed by Swift, premiered the same day as the song's release. The video is a continuation of the storyline from her preceding video for "Cardigan" (2020), showing a golden thread that guides the singer through a mystical saga and leads her to her fated lover. It received widespread critical acclaim from music critics and audiences alike, with particular praise for its romantic lyricism and guitar-centric sound.

"Willow" debuted atop the Billboard Hot 100, scoring Swift her seventh number-one song in the United States, third number-one debut, (Note: Following "Shake It Off" (2014) and "Cardigan" (2020).) and second chart-topper in 2020 after "Cardigan"; simultaneously, Evermore opened at number-one on the Billboard 200, making Swift the first act in history to debut atop both the charts in the same week on two occasions, following Folklore and "Cardigan". "Willow" further topped Billboard's Hot Alternative Songs, Hot Rock & Alternative Songs, Digital Song Sales, and Adult Pop Songs charts. The song also reached number one in Australia, Canada, and Singapore, and the top 10 in Belgium, Croatia, Hungary, Ireland, Malaysia, New Zealand, and the United Kingdom. Swift performed "Willow" live for the first time at the 63rd Annual Grammy Awards, which was described by Rolling Stone as one of the greatest Grammy performances of all time. The music video of "Willow" earned three nominations at the 2021 MTV Video Music Awards.

== Production and release ==
American singer-songwriter Taylor Swift launched her eighth studio album, Folklore, in July 2020. After its release, the album's co-producer Aaron Dessner composed an instrumental track "Westerly", named after the location of Swift's Rhode Island home. An hour later, Swift wrote "Willow" to the track and sent him back the finished song. "Willow" was surprise released on December 11, 2020, alongside Swift's ninth album, Evermore, as its lead single. The song was written by Swift and Dessner, who also produced the track. Dessner programmed the track and played drums, percussion, keyboards, synthesizers, piano, and electric, bass, and acoustic guitars. The orchestration was provided by Bryce Dessner. Greg Calbi and Steve Fallone mastered the track at Sterling Sound, Edgewater, New Jersey, while Jonathan Low mixed it at Long Pond Studios in Hudson Valley, New York.

"Willow"
A sample of "Willow", a song driven by a melodious guitar riff

On December 13, 2020, Swift's 31st birthday, an electronic "Dancing Witch" version of "Willow" was released, remixed by the Swedish producer Elvira Anderfjärd. It was followed by an acoustic "Lonely Witch" version on December 14, and a synth-driven "Moonlit Witch" version on December 15. A video for the "Lonely Witch" version, featuring behind-the-scenes pictures from the "Willow" music video, and a video for the "Dancing Witch" version, featuring the storyboards of the "Willow" music video, were uploaded to Swift's YouTube channel on December 15, 2020. "Willow (90's trend remix)", an electronic remix of the song, was released as part of the Evermore fan edition, which was available for digital download on June 3, 2021. The remix was later independently released onto digital download and streaming services on June 14.

== Composition ==
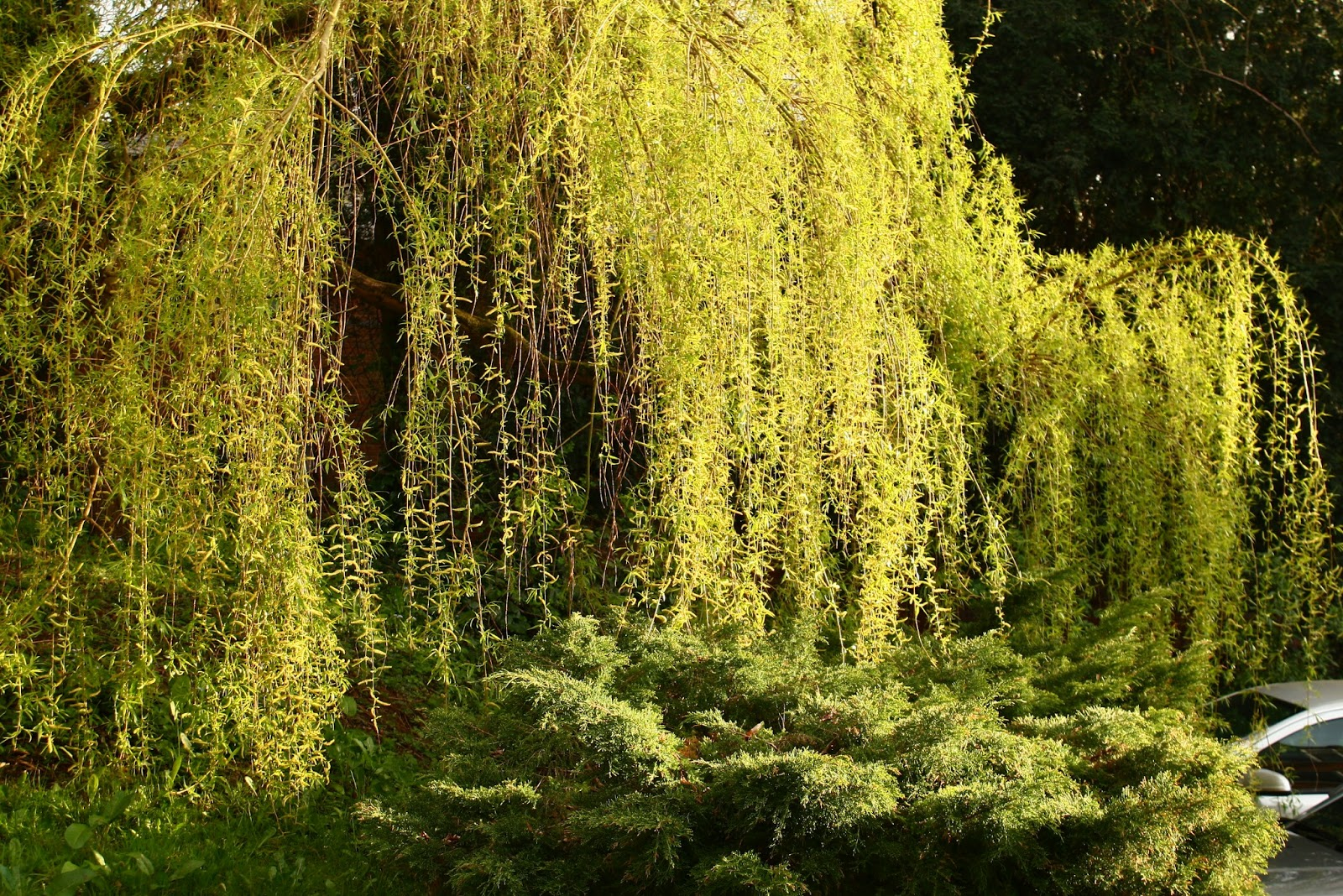
The song portrays life as a willow tree (pictured), and life-changing love as a wind that bends the tree.

"Willow" is a chamber folk ballad with Americana stylings, indie folk orchestration, tropical house accents, and a hip hop-leaning rhythm reminiscent of Swift's 2017 album, Reputation. It is built around a glockenspiel, drum machines, cello, French horn, electric guitars, violin, flute, and orchestrations, and is characterized by its "breathless" chorus.

"Willow" is about intrigue, desire, and the complexity that goes into wanting someone. I think it sounds like casting a spell to make someone fall in love with you.

— Swift, American Songwriter

The song is mostly set in 4/4 common time with 2/4 bars in the chorus. It has a tempo of 84 beats per minute. It is written in the key of E minor and Swift's vocals span from E_{3} to C_{5}. Constructed in verse–chorus form, it follows the chord progression Em–D–Em–D–Em–D–C. Lyrically, "Willow" is a love song that sees Swift invite her soulmate into her life, making use of several metaphors. Its chorus consists of lyrics such as "Wherever you stray, I follow" and "I'm begging for you to take my hand", which reference Swift's older lyrics: "nothing safe is worth the drive / And I will follow you, follow you home" in "Treacherous" (2012), and "you take my hand and drag me head first" in "Fearless" (2008), respectively.

== Critical reception ==
Patrick Ryan of USA Today named "Willow" as a lyrical standout on Evermore. In his album review for The New York Times, Jon Pareles complimented the song's "restlessly intertwined guitar picking" as one of Evermore's numerous musical flourishes. Paste critic Ellen Johnson commended the song as a "graceful opener" to Evermore, while Bobby Olivier of Spin called it an earworm suited for beach bonfires. Writing for The Guardian, Alexis Petridis opined that "Willow" could easily function as a "pop banger" if synthesizers, auto-tune and programmed beats replaced its "tasteful" acoustic arrangement. Variety's Chris Willman wrote that the song represents Swift's state of mind, and deemed it a cousin to "Invisible String" and "Peace", the eleventh and fifteenth tracks on Folklore (2020), respectively. Insider writers Courteney Larocca and Callie Ahlgrim lauded "Willow"; Ahlgrim admired the song's chorus and lyrics that can easily convey "deeply tangled" human emotions, while Larocca thought that the song resumes Swift's "dreamland" trope from "The Lakes" (2020), the final track on Folklore. Rolling Stone named "Willow" one of 2020's best pop collaborations, praising the pairing between Swift and producer Dessner.

== Commercial performance ==
Debuting at number one on the Billboard Hot 100, "Willow" scored Swift her seventh number-one single in the US. (Note: Following "We Are Never Ever Getting Back Together" (2012), "Shake It Off" (2014)", "Blank Space" (2014), "Bad Blood" (2015), "Look What You Made Me Do" (2017), and "Cardigan" (2020).) It made her the first artist in history to debut an album and a single at number one simultaneously on two occasions, previously achieving it with Folklore and "Cardigan" (2020). "Willow" was Swift's third number-one debut on the Hot 100, after "Shake It Off" (2014) and "Cardigan". The song became Swift's 29th top-10 hit on the Hot 100, surpassing Mariah Carey and Stevie Wonder as the artist with the sixth most top-10 entries in the chart's history, and extended her female record for the most debuts in the top-10, with 19. "Willow" collected 30 million streams, 12.3 million radio impressions, and 59,000 digital sales in its first week. On the chart dated January 2, 2021, it descended to number 38 on the Hot 100, breaking the record for the biggest fall from the number-one spot at that time.

"Willow" also debuted atop the Billboard Digital Songs chart, furthering her record for the most number-one tracks on the chart, with 21. The song also topped the Billboard Hot Rock & Alternative Songs chart, followed by 13 other Evermore tracks, giving Swift her second number-one song on the chart after "Cardigan". On the Billboard Hot Alternative Songs chart, Swift claimed 16 spots led by "Willow", besting Machine Gun Kelly's 12 simultaneous entries. Additionally, the song topped Billboard Alternative Streaming Songs and Alternative Digital Song Sales. Four months after its release, "Willow" topped the Billboard Adult Top 40 airplay chart dated April 21, 2021. It marked Swift's eighth number-one single on the chart and her first since "Delicate" (2018), tying her with Katy Perry for the third-most leaders on the chart. It spent three weeks atop it.

In Canada, "Willow" arrived at number one on the Canadian Hot 100, generating Swift's seventh number-one hit in the country. On the UK Singles Chart, "Willow" arrived at number three, shifting 35,183 units in its opening week; it was blocked from the top spot by two Christmas songs. The song marked Swift's eleventh top-five hit in the country. "Willow", along with fellow Evermore tracks "Champagne Problems" (number 15) and "No Body, No Crime" (number 19), increased Swift's total top-20 entries in the country to 21. Similarly, "Willow" landed at number three on Irish Singles Chart, alongside tracks "Champagne Problems" and "No Body, No Crime" at numbers six and 11, respectively, increasing Swift's total amount of Irish top-50 hits to 38.

In Australia, Swift achieved a "Chart Double" by topping both albums and singles charts at the same time. "Willow" opened atop the ARIA Singles Chart, garnering the singer her seventh Australian number-one hit, and the second in 2020 following "Cardigan". In New Zealand, "Willow" debuted at number three on the Top 40 Singles chart, with Evermore tracks "Champagne Problems", "No Body, No Crime" and "Gold Rush" landing at numbers 24, 29 and 34, respectively. On Billboard Global 200 and Global Excl. U.S. charts, "Willow" peaked at numbers two and five, respectively.

== Music video ==
An accompanying music video for "Willow", directed by Swift, was released along with the song. It is Swift's third self-directed video, following "The Man" and "Cardigan". The video describes the experience of yearning for someone and life's twists along the way to finding the right person. On December 15, 2020, a behind-the-scenes video and a "Before and After" video, featuring the original video footage side by side with their corresponding digital storyboard shots, illustrated by Vincent Lucido, were released.

=== Synopsis and analysis ===
The "Willow" music video is a continuation of the "Cardigan" video, picking up where the former left off. Swift, drenched from her oceanic voyage, (Note: In the music video for "Cardigan", Swift enters a magical piano in her cottage, which teleports her to an enchanted forest, and then to a dark, stormy ocean. She is stranded on the water surface, clinging on to a floating piano.) sits covered by a warm glow of her rustic cabin. A golden string in her hands (referencing the Folklore track "Invisible String") leads her to an alternate reality inside the back of her magical piano that helps her to traverse time and space. Swift has used the color gold to represent her then-boyfriend, Joe Alwyn, throughout her albums Reputation (2017), Lover (2019) and Folklore. The piano opens into a rabbit hole under the roots of a willow tree in an autumnal forest, on the other side. Swift emerges from the willow, embarking on a mystical journey guided by the magical thread. She sees a reflection of herself with a man (Korean-American dancer Taeok Lee) in a moonlit pool.

A scene in the "Willow" music video, where Swift is trapped inside a glass box, unable to join her love interest

The string later leads her to a scene from her childhood (a reference to "Seven"), where the child versions of Swift and Lee are seen playing together with the string, suggesting that the pair is destined to be together. Swift exits the tent and finds her adult self at a carnival tent party, where she performs with a golden mist-emitting lute inside a glass box (a metaphor from "Mirrorball"), dressed in a cream-colored Zimmerman gown and a bridal headpiece by Jennifer Behr (a "Love Story" reference). While Swift finds Lee, she is trapped inside the glass box, which Swift described before the video's premiere as a metaphor for her feelings about fame. She then realizes that the only way out is to follow the magical thread through the rabbit hole under floor of the glass box, a scene that may represent Swift reaching her lowest moments before finding a golden path once more. During this scene, Swift looks into the camera, while mouthing the lyrics "I come back stronger than a '90s trend", a nod to 1989, which is her first pop album.

The scene shifts to a wintry forest, where Swift emerges hooded in a cloak reminiscent of her video for "...Ready for It?" (2017). She is joined by other hooded dancers who gather in a circle to perform a ceremony around a bonfire that oozes lots of golden mist and magical orbs. Swift has referenced witchcraft in previous songs such as "...Ready for It?", "I Did Something Bad" (2017), and "Mad Woman" (2020). While dancing, she finds the golden string once again and follows it, leading her back to her cottage. Lee pulls off his mask and looks at the departing Swift in despair. Swift exits the piano wearing a new gown, representing the journey back to her roots as a changed person due to her experiences in the outside world.

At the end of the string, Swift finds out that she is not alone in the cottage and that the string has guided her to back to her lover, Lee, while the lyrics "every bait-and-switch was a work of art" play. The scene sees Swift appreciate the obstacles in her life that led to their relationship. The hook that she repeats throughout the song—"I'm begging for you to take my hand / Wreck my plans, that's my man"—finally comes true at the video's end. The couple walks out the door, holding hands, into a forest shrouded in golden sunlight. This climax references "Daylight", the final track on Swift's seventh album Lover, in which she sings about abandoning her cloaks, and how one has to "step into the daylight and let it go".

=== Production ===
Abiding COVID-19 regulations, the music video was shot using a remote camera mounted on a jib, without the need for a professional camera operator.

The cinematography was handled by Rodrigo Prieto, who worked on the "Cardigan" video as well. Swift did not reveal to Prieto or the technical crew that the video was for a new album or song, so the video was shot without using the song. The shooting took place under strict COVID-19 pandemic safety measures, including testing protocols, as advised by Directors Guild of America, Screen Actors Guild and International Cinematographers Guild. The entire crew, including Swift and Lee, had their masks on; the pair took off their masks only during action. The dancers in the scene depicting witchcraft had their masks on while performing, thus their faces are not visible in the video. A color-coded system was used to signify which crew member could be close to the set and the actors; anybody in immediate vicinity of a scene had to wear a red wristband. Face shields were used whenever Swift or any cast was approached. The video was shot without a camera operator, using a crane-directed remote camera.

The pre-production phase was a back-and-forth interactive process between Swift, Prieto and other technicians. Swift wanted the video to conclude back in the cabin (as with "Cardigan") and that her lover, Lee, would be inside when she returns. Upon further discussion with Prieto and team, it was decided that both Swift and Lee would leave the cabin at the end. Swift initially developed the idea for the video as set at night, but then decided it would occur during the daytime. For the witchcraft scene, Swift did not want to use a real bonfire due to the 2020 California wildfires. Instead, she conceived of using magical orbs.

Ethan Tobman, the production designer, presented Swift with reference images and ideas for the sets, and one of them was having magenta leaves on the ground, which the singer liked. Tobman also suggested the idea for the autumnal forest. He worked with his art director, Simon Morgan, over Zoom. For the bonfire scene, Morgan and Prieto, gaffer Manny Tapia and key grip Donald Reynolds, sound-staged first and taped the space in the center where the magic orbs would be. The distance was measured to the blue screen background, and taped the spots of the trees, and mapped the lighting for the set of the carnival scene.

== Awards and nominations ==
"Willow" was nominated for a Nashville Songwriters Award in 2021, for the category "Ten Songs I Wish I'd Written", while the music video was nominated for an Association of Independent Commercial Producers (AICP) award in the editorial category. At the 2021 Meus Prêmios Nick, "Willow" received a nomination for Video of the Year. At the 2021 MTV Video Music Awards, "Willow" received three nominations for Best Pop, Best Direction, and Best Art Direction, while Swift received a nod for Artist of the Year.

Awards and nominations for "Willow"
Year	Ceremony	Award	Result	Ref.
2021	AICP Awards	Editorial: Music Videos	Nominated	
2021	MTV Video Music Awards	Best Pop	Nominated	
2021	MTV Video Music Awards	Best Direction	Nominated	
2021	MTV Video Music Awards	Best Art Direction	Nominated	
2021	Meus Prêmios Nick	Video of the Year	Nominated	
2021	MTV Europe Music Awards	Best Video	Nominated	
2021	Nashville Songwriters Association International	Ten Songs I Wish I'd Written	Nominated	
2022
2022	ASCAP Awards	ASCAP Pop Award	Won	
2022	BMI Awards	Best Performed Song of the Year	Won	

== Live performances ==
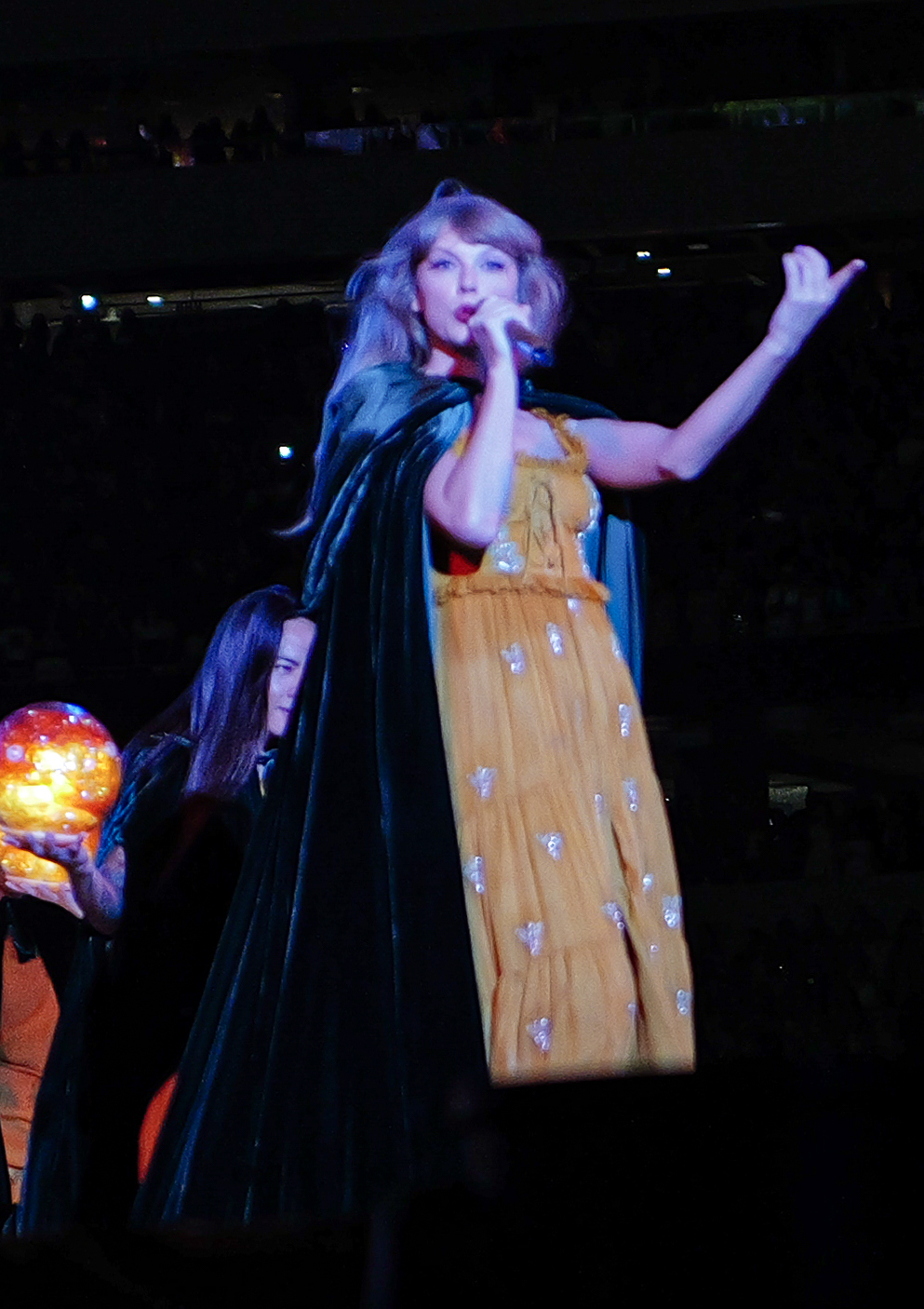
Swift singing "Willow" on the Eras Tour (2023)

Swift performed "Willow" for the first time at the 63rd Annual Grammy Awards as part of a medley with "Cardigan" and "August", in a "dreamy" cottagecore setting featuring a moss-covered cabin in a forest, accompanied by collaborators Dessner and Jack Antonoff. The singer won Album of the Year for Folklore at the ceremony. Pitchfork critic Cat Zhang praised the performance as one of the show's best moments. Zhang lauded Swift's vocals and the enchanted forest-themed spectacle of the set, describing her look as a "benevolent fairy princess in a kingdom of dwarves". The Washington Post ranked Swift's performance as the sixth best of the evening, and highlighted its "woodsy, mystical aesthetic" aligning with that of Folklore, with "haunted-looking trees and glittering gold lights in the background". Billboard writer Heran Mamo ranked the "Lord of the Rings-meets-Twilight fantasy" performance as the fourth best of the show. Music journalist Rob Sheffield ranked Swift's performance as the first of the "10 Reasons We Loved the 2021 Grammys." Rolling Stone listed it as one of the top-five greatest Grammy performances of all time.

Swift included "Willow" on the set list of the Eras Tour (2023–2024).

== Track listing ==
Digital download and streaming

1. "Willow" – 3:34

Digital download and streaming (dancing witch version — Elvira remix)

1. "Willow" (dancing witch version) [Elvira remix] – 3:04

Digital download and streaming (lonely witch version)

1. "Willow" (lonely witch version) – 3:34

Digital download and streaming (moonlit witch version)

1. "Willow" (moonlit witch version) – 3:29

Digital download and streaming – Willow (the witch collection) – EP

1. "Willow" – 3:34
2. "Willow" (dancing witch version) [Elvira remix] – 3:04
3. "Willow" (lonely witch version) – 3:34
4. "Willow" (moonlit witch version) – 3:28
5. "Willow" (music video) – 4:12
6. "Willow" (lyric video) – 3:40

Digital download and streaming (dancing witch version — Elvira remix, web store exclusive)

1. "Willow" (dancing witch version) [Elvira remix]
2. "Willow" (instrumental version)

Digital download and streaming (lonely witch version, web store exclusive)

1. "Willow" (lonely witch version)
2. "Willow" (songwriting demo)

Digital download and streaming (moonlit witch version, web store exclusive)

1. "Willow" (moonlit witch version)
2. "Christmas Tree Farm" (recorded live at the 2019 iHeartRadio Jingle Ball)

Digital download and streaming (90's trend remix)

1. "Willow" (90's trend remix) – 3:45

== Credits and personnel ==
Credits adapted from YouTube.

=== Song ===
- Taylor Swift – vocals, songwriter
- Aaron Dessner – producer, songwriter, vocal recorder, drum machine programmer, percussion, keyboards, synthesizers, piano, electric guitar, bass guitar, acoustic guitar
- Jonathan Low – vocal recorder, mixer
- Bryce Dessner – orchestrator
- Greg Calbi – masterer
- Steve Fallone – masterer
- James McAlister – synthesizers, drum machine programmer
- Bryan Devendorf – percussion, drum machine programmer
- Yuki Numata Resnick – violin
- Josh Kaufman – electric guitar
- Clarice Jensen – cello
- Jason Treuting – glockenspiel
- Alex Soop – flute
- CJ Camerieri – French horn
- Thomas Bartlett – keyboard, synthesizers
- Benjamin Lanz – modular synth (music video only)

=== Video ===
- Taylor Swift – director
- Rodrigo Prieto – director of photography
- Jil Hardin – producer
- Chancler Haynes – editor
- Ethan Tobman – production designer
- Regina Fernandez – production designer
- Joseph Cassell – stylist
- Sunshine Madsen – stylist
- Joe Osborne – first assistant director
- EV Salomon – co-first assistant director
- Ingenuity Studios – visual effects
- Grant Miller – visual effects
- David Lebensfeld – visual effects
- Jumanah Shaheen – visual effects
- Rebecca Skinner – executive producer
- Kathy Palmer – co-producer
- Manny Tapia – gaffer
- Alexander Griffiths – key grip
- Vincent Lucido – storyboarder

== Charts ==
=== Weekly charts ===
Weekly chart performance for "Willow"
Chart (2020–2022)	Peak position
Australia (ARIA)	1
Australia Country Hot 50 (TMN)	48
Austria (Ö3 Austria Top 40)	30
Belgium (Ultratop 50 Flanders)	40
Belgium (Ultratip Bubbling Under Wallonia)	1
Canada Hot 100 (Billboard)	1
Canada AC (Billboard)	9
Canada CHR/Top 40 (Billboard)	27
Canada Hot AC (Billboard)	7
Croatia (HRT)	4
Croatia Songs (Billboard)	9
Czech Republic Singles Digital (ČNS IFPI)	54
Euro Digital Song Sales (Billboard)	7
France (SNEP)	111
Germany (GfK)	46
Global 200 (Billboard)	2
Greece International (IFPI)	20
Hungary (Single Top 40)	9
Iceland (Tónlistinn)	37
Israel (Galgalatz)	4
Ireland (IRMA)	3
Italy (FIMI)	70
Lebanon (Lebanese Top 20)	16
Lithuania (AGATA)	25
Malaysia (RIM)	2
Netherlands (Dutch Top 40)	30
Netherlands (Single Top 100)	49
New Zealand (Recorded Music NZ)	3
Portugal (AFP)	20
Singapore (RIAS)	1
Slovakia (Singles Digitál Top 100)	50
Sweden (Sverigetopplistan)	67
Switzerland (Schweizer Hitparade)	21
UK Singles (Official Charts)	3
US Billboard Hot 100	1
US Adult Contemporary (Billboard)	6
US Adult Pop Airplay (Billboard)	1
US Hot Rock & Alternative Songs (Billboard)	1
US Pop Airplay (Billboard)	17

=== Year-end charts ===
Year-end chart performance for "Willow"
Chart (2021)	Position
Australia (ARIA)	68
Canada (Canadian Hot 100)	47
Global 200 (Billboard)	101
Israel International (Galgalatz)	27
US Billboard Hot 100	55
US Adult Contemporary (Billboard)	6
US Adult Top 40 (Billboard)	6
US Hot Rock & Alternative Songs (Billboard)	6

== Certifications ==
Certifications for "Willow"
Region	Certification	Certified units/sales
Australia (ARIA)	5× Platinum	350,000^{‡}
Brazil (Pro-Música Brasil)	Diamond	160,000^{‡}
Canada (Music Canada)	Platinum	80,000^{‡}
Denmark (IFPI Danmark)	Platinum	90,000^{‡}
France (SNEP)	Gold	100,000^{‡}
Italy (FIMI)	Gold	50,000^{‡}
New Zealand (RMNZ)	2× Platinum	60,000^{‡}
Norway (IFPI Norway)	Gold	30,000^{‡}
Poland (ZPAV)	Platinum	50,000^{‡}
Spain (Promusicae)	Platinum	60,000^{‡}
United Kingdom (BPI)	Platinum	600,000^{‡}
United States (RIAA)	Platinum	1,000,000^{‡}
^{‡} Sales+streaming figures based on certification alone.

== Release history ==
Release dates and formats for "Willow"
Region	Date	Format(s)	Version	Label	Ref.
Various	December 11, 2020	Digital download; streaming	Original	Republic	
Various	December 13, 2020	Digital download; streaming	"Dancing Witch"	Republic	
United States	December 14, 2020	Adult contemporary radio	Original	Republic	
United States	December 15, 2020	Contemporary hit radio	Original	Republic	
Various	December 15, 2020	Digital download; streaming	"Lonely Witch"	Republic	
Various	December 16, 2020	Digital download; streaming	"Moonlit Witch"	Republic	
Italy	December 18, 2020	Radio airplay	Original	Universal	
Various	June 14, 2021	Digital download; streaming	90's trend remix	Republic	

== See also ==
- List of Billboard Adult Top 40 number-one songs of the 2020s
- List of Billboard Digital Song Sales number ones of 2020
- List of Billboard Hot 100 number-one singles of the 2020s
- List of Billboard Hot 100 number ones of 2020
- List of Billboard Hot 100 top-ten singles in 2020
- List of Canadian Hot 100 number-one singles of 2020
- List of number-one singles of 2020 (Australia)
- List of number-one songs of 2020 (Singapore)
- List of top 10 singles in 2020 (Australia)
- List of top 10 singles in 2020 (Ireland)
- List of UK top-ten singles in 2020
