= Wishing Well (Juice Wrld song) =

2020 single by Juice Wrld

Single by Juice Wrld

from the album Legends Never Die
- Released: July 28, 2020
- Recorded: 2018
- Genre: Soft rock; emo rap
- Length: 3:14
- Label: Grade A; Interscope
- Songwriters: Jarad Higgins; Darrel Jackson; Lukasz Gottwald
- Producers: Dr. Luke; Chopsquad DJ

Juice Wrld singles chronology
"Come & Go" (2020)	"Wishing Well" (2020)	"Smile" (2020)

Music video
- "Wishing Well" on YouTube

"Wishing Well" is a song by American rapper Juice Wrld, from his posthumous third studio album Legends Never Die. Written alongside producers Dr. Luke and Chopsquad DJ, it was sent to rhythmic contemporary radio as the album's fifth single on July 28, 2020. An animated music video was released on July 13, 2020. An uplifting song reflecting on fame, depression and drug use, the song received positive reviews from critics who regarded it as a standout, with Billboard ranking it as the best song on the album. It debuted at number five on the Billboard Hot 100, simultaneously charting in the top 10 with four other songs from the album.

== Background and composition ==
The song first leaked under the title "Lauryn Hill", due to the line "Drugs killing me softly, Lauryn Hill". The track starts off with a guitar intro, and consists of a Robotech sample. Deemed a haunting, yet "uplifting" track, it finds Juice singing about how he is going to be ok, although it may not always be the case, because, in the end, he wants to keep his fans and family happy. Felson Sajonas of Hypebeast noted "Wishing Well" for being a metaphor for Juice's "deep desire to be free from his demons and the constant cycle of drugs and depression". In the chorus, the line "Perky got me itching like a anthill", references Percocet, a drug that led to his death. Genius' Chris Mench described the line as "a grim prediction" of Juice's passing.

== Critical reception ==
Billboard ranked the song as the best on Legends Never Die, with the magazine's Michael Saponara regarding it as "a bonafide stand-out cut with Juice putting his gifts on display". Rolling Stone's Danny Schwartz called it a "soaring standout", comparing it to Blink-182. Alex Zidel of HotNewHipHop said the song stands out "because of the troubling story that Juice tells". Aaron Williams of Uproxx praised it as the album's centerpiece, stating that the track "is a real heartbreaker and leads to some of the emotional high points of the album", while pointing out Juice Wrld's awareness of his drug problem, citing the lyrics "If it wasn't for the pills, I wouldn't be here / But if I keep taking these pills, I won't be here". Variety's Jem Aswad named it one of the top songs of the week, noting its "unintentionally timely" opening line: "I can't breathe". However, the magazine misattributed the line to a different Juice Wrld song, "Conversations".

== Music video ==
An official animated video was released on July 13, 2020. The KDC Visions-created visual opens with Juice throwing his feelings out of a cardboard box into an actual wishing well. As with the song's lyrics, it further shows Juice reflecting on how he copes with fame and drug use. A variety of emojis acts as his emotions, while scenes cut to an army of ants, Juice gazing into the stars on top of his convertible, and living an extravagant lifestyle at his mansion. He is also seen seeking help through phone calls and talking to a psychiatrist, portrayed by himself.

== Charts ==
=== Weekly charts ===
Chart (2020–2021)	Peak position
Australia (ARIA)	14
Austria (Ö3 Austria Top 40)	36
Belgium (Ultratip Bubbling Under Flanders)	2
Global 200 (Billboard)	46
Canada Hot 100 (Billboard)	8
Czech Republic Singles Digital (ČNS IFPI)	27
Denmark (Tracklisten)	32
Germany (GfK)	88
Greece (IFPI)	30
Hungary (Stream Top 40)	24
Iceland (Tónlistinn)	32
Ireland (IRMA)	9
Lithuania (AGATA)	21
Netherlands (Single Top 100)	41
New Zealand (Recorded Music NZ)	13
Norway (VG-lista)	23
Portugal (AFP)	57
Slovakia Singles Digital (ČNS IFPI)	50
Sweden (Sverigetopplistan)	27
Switzerland (Schweizer Hitparade)	63
UK Singles (OCC)	15
US Billboard Hot 100	5
US Hot R&B/Hip-Hop Songs (Billboard)	4
US Rhythmic Airplay (Billboard)	9
US Rolling Stone Top 100	4

=== Year-end charts ===
Chart (2020)	Position
Canada (Canadian Hot 100)	87
US Billboard Hot 100	92
US Hot R&B/Hip-Hop Songs (Billboard)	45
US Rhythmic (Billboard)	43

== Certifications ==
Region	Certification	Certified units/sales
Australia (ARIA)	Platinum	70,000^{‡}
Brazil (Pro-Música Brasil)	Platinum	40,000^{‡}
Denmark (IFPI Danmark)	Gold	45,000^{‡}
Germany (BVMI)	Gold	200,000^{‡}
New Zealand (RMNZ)	2× Platinum	60,000^{‡}
Poland (ZPAV)	Gold	25,000^{‡}
Portugal (AFP)	Platinum	10,000^{‡}
United Kingdom (BPI)	Platinum	600,000^{‡}
United States (RIAA)	2× Platinum	2,000,000^{‡}
^{‡} Sales+streaming figures based on certification alone.
