= DJ Scheme =

American DJ and record producer

- Born: May 23, 1997 (age 29); Palm Beach County, Florida, U.S.
- Origin: Florida, U.S.
- Genre: Hip hop
- Occupations: Disc jockey; record producer; songwriter; music executive
- Years active: 2014–present
- Labels: Empire Distribution; Scheme Records
- Member of: Members Only

Gabriel Guerra (born May 23, 1997), known professionally as DJ Scheme, is an American DJ and record producer. He first gained recognition as part of the duo Wifisfuneral and later became known for his work in the hip-hop scene, including his associations with rappers XXXTentacion, Ski Mask the Slump God, and Juice Wrld, as well as his involvement in the hip hop collective Members Only.

== Early life ==
Guerra is from Palm Beach, Florida. From a young age, he developed an interest in music and was exposed to a range of genres, including hip hop and alternative rock. He initially played instruments such as drums and trumpet before becoming interested in DJing and music production.

== Career ==
Guerra began his career as part of the musical duo Wifisfuneral, alongside Izzy Kill$. Following the group’s split, Izzy Kill$ continued to use the name Wifisfuneral as a solo artist, while Guerra pursued his career independently. In 2016, Guerra became affiliated with the hip hop collective Members Only and served as the official DJ for rapper XXXTentacion. Through these associations, he gained recognition within the SoundCloud rap scene and collaborated with artists such as Ski Mask the Slump God, for whom he served as a record producer and DJ.

Guerra later worked closely with rapper Juice Wrld, producing music for him and serving as a DJ during his tours.

He has also been a recurring DJ at the Rolling Loud festival and served as the DJ for the 2019 XXL Freshman Class cyphers.

On July 10, 2020, Legends Never Die, the third studio album by American rapper Juice Wrld was released. Guerra co-produced the track "Conversations".

On December 4 2020, DJ Scheme released his debut studio album Family, through Empire Distribution, featuring 17 tracks and guest appearances from artists including Skrillex, Joey Badass, Ty Dolla Sign, Cordae, Snot, Lil Yachty, Lil Mosey, Lil Keed, and Ski Mask the Slump God. A deluxe version, titled Family (Deluxe), was released the following month and included the track “Buck 50”, featuring Juice Wrld. The album was ranked second on a Rolling Stone chart highlighting breakthrough artists, driven by nearly 15 million streams during the month of its release.

In 2022, Guerra co-produced the single “Surround Sound” by JID, featuring 21 Savage and Baby Tate.

Guerra co-produced IShowSpeed’s debut extended play, Trip 2 Brazil, which was released on March 24, 2024.

== Awards and nominations ==
In 2021, DJ Scheme won the award for DJ of the Year at the BET Hip Hop Awards.

== Discography ==
=== Studio albums ===
Family (2020)
