= Legends Never Die (Juice Wrld album) =

2020 posthumous studio album by Juice Wrld

- Standard cover

Studio album by Juice Wrld
- Released: July 10, 2020
- Genres: Hip-hop; emo rap
- Length: 58:50
- Labels: Grade A; Interscope
- Producers: 1Mind; 2Fly; Blake Slatkin; Charlie Handsome; Chopsquad DJ; Cxdy; Dr. Luke; Dre Moon; DT; DY Krazy; Gezin; Heavy Mellow; Joe Reeves; KhaledBeats; Marshmello; Max Lord; Morgan O'Connor; Nick Mira; OkTanner; Rex Kudo; Ronny J; Skrillex; Strapazoot; Take a Daytrip; Taz Taylor; Tyler Turner

Juice Wrld chronology
Death Race for Love (2019)	Legends Never Die (2020)	Fighting Demons (2021)

Singles from Legends Never Die
- 1. "Righteous" Released: April 24, 2020; 2. "Tell Me U Luv Me" Released: May 29, 2020; 3. "Life's a Mess" Released: July 6, 2020; 4. "Come & Go" Released: July 9, 2020; 5. "Wishing Well" Released: July 28, 2020; 6. "Smile" Released: August 7, 2020

Legends Never Die is the third studio album by American rapper Juice Wrld. It was posthumously released by Grade A Productions and Interscope Records on July 10, 2020. The album follows Juice Wrld's death from a drug-related seizure approximately seven months prior, on December 8, 2019. It features guest appearances from the Weeknd, Trippie Redd, Marshmello, Polo G, the Kid Laroi, and Halsey. The 5th anniversary deluxe edition was released on July 11, 2025 and features an additional appearance from XXXTentacion and also includes the singles "In My Head" and "Face 2 Face".

Legends Never Die received generally positive reviews and debuted atop the US Billboard 200 with 497,000 album-equivalent units in its first week. It also reached number one in several other countries, including Australia, Canada, Ireland and the United Kingdom. The album was supported by six singles: "Righteous", "Tell Me U Luv Me", "Life's a Mess", "Come & Go", "Wishing Well", and "Smile".

== Background ==
In January 2020, a month following Juice Wrld's death, it was reported that at least two thousand songs were recorded before he died. 26 of these were leaked onto the streaming platform SoundCloud by the user "999 WRLD". Juice's label (Grade A) and family released a statement regarding his unreleased music:

From the bottom of our hearts, we want to thank each and every one of you for your undivided adoration and love for Juice. You guys meant the entire world to Juice and by listening to his music, watching his videos and sharing your stories about him, you are keeping his memory alive forever. We plan to honor Juice's talents, his spirit, and the love he felt for his fans by sharing unreleased music and other projects that he was passionately in the process of developing.

On May 4, 2020, Juice's girlfriend Ally Lotti referenced an album under the title of The Outsiders, which Juice Wrld had intended to make his next album. However, the label and Juice Wrld's grieving family chose to delay The Outsiders and first put a 15-track tribute album titled Legends Never Die that was announced on July 7, 2020. Two days after the album announcement, Juice's manager Lil Bibby hinted at a deluxe edition after fans demanded more songs. A new version of the album's final song "Man of the Year" was added in the track listing on July 14, 2020, just days after the album's release.

== Promotion ==
"Righteous" was released on April 24, 2020, as the album's lead single, the song peaked at number 11 on the US Billboard Hot 100. "Tell Me U Luv Me" featuring Trippie Redd, was released on May 29, 2020, as the album's second single, the song peaked at number 38 on the Billboard Hot 100.

"Life's a Mess" featuring Halsey, was released on July 6, 2020, as the album's third single, the song peaked at number nine on the Billboard Hot 100. A teaser video of the album was released later that day. "Come & Go" featuring EDM producer Marshmello, was released on July 9, as the album's fourth single, the song peaked at number two on the Billboard Hot 100.

The album's fifth single, "Wishing Well", was sent to rhythmic contemporary radio on July 28, 2020, the song peaked at number five on the Billboard Hot 100. "Smile" featuring the Weeknd, was released on August 7, 2020, as the album's sixth single, the song peaked at number eight on the Billboard Hot 100.

== Critical reception ==
Professional ratings
Aggregate scores
Source	Rating
AnyDecentMusic?	7.2/10
Metacritic	75/100
Review scores
Source	Rating
AllMusic	4/5 stars
And It Don't Stop	A−
Clash	9/10
The Guardian	3/5 stars
HipHopDX	3.7/5
The Line of Best Fit	9/10
NME	3/5 stars
Pitchfork	7.1/10
RapReviews	6.5/10
Rolling Stone	3.5/5 stars

Legends Never Die was met with generally positive reviews. At Metacritic, which assigns a normalized rating out of 100 to reviews from professional publications, the album received an average score of 75, based on 10 reviews. Aggregator AnyDecentMusic? gave it 7.2 out of 10, based on their assessment of the critical consensus.

Writing for Clash, Mike Milenko acclaimed the album, calling it "poetic, prophetic and poignant". Milenko further stated that the album's production works well with Wrld's voice and noted "Life's a Mess", "Come & Go", "Man of the Year" and "Wishing Well" as standouts from the record. However, Milenko opined that "some tracks are throwaway". Sheldon Pearce of The Guardian wrote that Legends Never Die is "overstuffed, sometimes underwritten and often puerile", but praise was directed towards Wrlds' performances on the album. Pearce also commended the way Wrld's "leading his listeners through their own angst", referring to the tracks "Bad Energy" and "Fighting Demons", on which Pearce opined that he "sounds like a patron saint of the melancholy masses". The Line of Best Fit's reviewer Steven Loftin, who praised the album, wrote that it's "both a celebration and a standing document to the intricate mind he [Wrld] truly was, and it indeed does justice to a unique mind". A. D. Amorosi of Variety said, "Sonically, compared with Juice WRLD's early SoundCloud material, Legends Never Die, is positively lush – not over-produced, but comparatively elaborately arranged". Fred Thomas of AllMusic gave a positive review, stating, "Legends Never Die is as strong a collection of Juice WRLD songs as any, with already-searing songs made more intense by the shadow of their departed creator looming over the album". Mimi Kenny of HipHopDX said, "Legends Never Die functions as a goodbye to and from Juice WRLD. His exact wishes for a post-death album might never be known, but this avoids feeling exploitative". Robert Christgau appraised Juice Wrld as an "anxiety-ridden melodicist" and went on to say:

However effortless his tuneful rivulets of pitch-corrected singsong, however proud his talent and earned his success, he was frightened and insecure underneath. This kind of torment always has a biochemical component and afflicts humans of every background. But how can it not be exacerbated by systemic racism? Many rappers admit that it afflicts them to one extent or other. But Juice Wrld put it front and center, and for me that renders his melodies more likable and his art uncommonly affecting—I feel for this drug abuser and enjoy his music more as a result. Materially, he did quite well for himself during his brief lifetime. But he was honest and decent enough to deserve better.

Other reviewers were less impressed. Dhruva Balram of NME called the album bloated and noted that it does "little to serve his [Wrld's] legacy justice". However, Barlam praised the first half of the album, while opining that the "intimacy" of Wrld's other projects is missing on Legends Never Die. Balram described the criticism as the following: "Despite the contagious nature of most of the tracks, that message is muted or left jumbled within a meandering album. Juice Wrld's music came to life most when he made it seem like you were the only two people in the room like he was speaking directly to you, the listener. That intimacy is sadly missing here." Brandon Caldwell of Pitchfork called the record repetitive at times, but stated that "the gripping parts of Legends Never Die come when Juice is speaking from the heart". Writing for Rolling Stone, Danny Schwartz wrote that "the album shines brightest when Juice stops navel-gazing, when he tempers his fatalism with a sense of hope and togetherness, the yang to his depressive yin". Schwartz noted the tracks "Righteous" and "Wishing Well" as standouts.

=== Year-end lists ===
Select year-end rankings of Legends Never Die
Publication	List	Rank	Ref.
Billboard	The 20 Best Rap Albums of 2020	10	
Cleveland.com	Best Albums of 2020	41	
Complex	The Best Albums of 2020	40	

=== Industry awards ===
Awards and nominations for Legends Never Die
Year	Ceremony	Category	Result	Ref.
2021	American Music Awards	Favorite Rap/Hip Hop Album	Nominated	
2021	Billboard Music Awards	Top Billboard 200 Album	Nominated	
2021	Billboard Music Awards	Top Rap Album	Nominated	

== Commercial performance ==
Legends Never Die debuted at number one on the US Billboard 200 with 497,000 album-equivalent units (including 209,000 pure album sales) in its first week, becoming the rapper's second number-one album. The album also accumulated a total of 422.63 million on-demand streams of the set's tracks in the week ending July 25. For the week ending July 25, 2020, a total of 17 of the album's songs charted on the US Billboard Hot 100, with five entries in the top 10: "Come & Go", "Wishing Well", "Conversations", "Life's a Mess", and "Hate the Other Side", which reached numbers two, five, seven, nine, and 10, respectively. This made Juice Wrld the third artist to ever achieve this, behind the Beatles and Drake; the album also became the most successful posthumous release in 20 years. "Life's a Mess" notably jumped from number 74 to number nine that week. Legends Never Die was the fifth best selling album of 2020 with 1.990 million album-equivalent units, including 301,000 pure copies in the United States.

In the United Kingdom, Legends Never Die debuted at number one on the UK Albums Chart with 22,000 album-equivalent units.

== Track listing ==
Legends Never Die track listing
No.	Title	Writer(s)	Producer(s)	Length
1.	"Anxiety" (Intro)	Jarad Higgins		1:10
2.	"Conversations"	Higgins; Ronald Spence Jr.; Christian Monaco; Gabriel Guerra	Ronny J; Ardist^{[a]}; DJ Scheme^{[a]}; Nils^{[b]}	3:01
3.	"Titanic"	Higgins; Dwan Avery; Masamune Kudo	DY Krazy; Rex Kudo	2:56
4.	"Bad Energy"	Higgins; Denzel Baptiste; David Biral; Blake Slatkin	Take a Daytrip; Slatkin	3:06
5.	"Righteous"	Higgins; Nicholas Mira; Ryan Vojtesak	Nick Mira; Charlie Handsome^{[a]}	4:02
6.	"Blood on My Jeans"	Higgins; Filip Gežin; Max Lord; Arian-Zvonimir Vuica	Gezin; Lord; Strapazoot	2:34
7.	"Smile" (with the Weeknd)	Higgins; Abel Tesfaye; Mira; Cody Rounds; Danny Snodgrass, Jr.	Mira; Cxdy; Taz Taylor	3:16
8.	"Tell Me U Luv Me" (with Trippie Redd)	Higgins; Michael White II; Mira; Tanner Katich	Mira; OkTanner	3:00
9.	"Hate the Other Side" (with Marshmello featuring Polo G and the Kid Laroi)	Higgins; Christopher Comstock; Taurus Bartlett; Charlton Howard; Niles Hollowell-Dhar; David Moody	Marshmello	2:40
10.	"Get Through It" (Interlude)	Higgins		0:20
11.	"Life's a Mess" (with Halsey)	Higgins; Ashley Frangipane; Brandon Dickinson; Vojtesak; Kudo	Charlie Handsome; Kudo; Heavy Mellow^{[c]}; Rick Rubin^{[c]}	3:22
12.	"Come & Go" (with Marshmello)	Higgins; Comstock	Marshmello	3:25
13.	"I Want It"	Higgins; Sebastian Lopez; Andre Proctor; Tyler Turner	1Mind; Dre Moon; Turner	2:53
14.	"Fighting Demons"	Higgins; Dorien Theus; Mira	DT; Mira	3:20
15.	"Wishing Well"	Higgins; Darrell Jackson; Lukasz Gottwald	Chopsquad DJ; Dr. Luke	3:14
16.	"Screw Juice"	Higgins; Mira	Mira	2:59
17.	"Up Up and Away"	Higgins; Kudo; Vojtesak	Kudo; Charlie Handsome^{[b]}	2:27
18.	"The Man, the Myth, the Legend" (Interlude)	Higgins		2:16
19.	"Stay High"	Higgins; Lloyd Mizell; Khaled Rohaim	2Fly; KhaledBeats; Sid Mallick^{[b]}	2:48
20.	"Can't Die"	Higgins; Avery; Morgan O'Connor	DY Krazy; O'Connor	3:02
21.	"Man of the Year"	Higgins; Everett Romano; Joe Reeves; Kudo; Sonny Moore; James Throckmorton	Heavy Mellow; Reeves; Kudo; Skrillex	2:16
22.	"Juice WRLD Speaks from Heaven" (Outro)	Higgins		0:30
Total length:				58:50

Japanese edition (bonus tracks)
No.	Title	Writer(s)	Producer(s)	Length
23.	"All Girls Are the Same"	Higgins; Mira	Mira	2:45
24.	"Lucid Dreams"	Higgins; Snodgrass; Mira; Gordon Sumner; Dominic Miller	Mira	3:59
25.	"Robbery"	Higgins; Mira	Mira	4:00
Total length:				69:35

5th Anniversary Edition
No.	Title	Writer(s)	Producer(s)	Length
23.	"The Way" (with XXXTentacion)	Higgins; Jahseh Onfroy; John Cunningham; Robert Soukiasyan	John Cunningham	3:50
24.	"All Life Long"	Higgins; Dot Da Genius; Denzel Baptiste; David Biral	Dot Da Genius; Take a Daytrip	3:28
25.	"In My Head"	Higgins; TrePounds; Max Lord; Sheldon Ferguson	TrePounds; Max Lord; Sheldon Ferguson	3:12
26.	"Face 2 Face"	Higgins; Ryan Vojtesak; Rex Kudo; Joe Reeves	Charlie Handsome; Rex Kudo; Joe Reeves	2:04
Total length:				71:00

Notes

- ^{^[a]} signifies a co-producer
- ^{^[b]} signifies an uncredited co-producer
- ^{^[c]} signifies an uncredited additional producer
- "Smile" was added to the album as part of a reissue on August 7, 2020.

== Personnel ==
Credits adapted from the album's liner notes.

- Juice Wrld – vocals (all tracks)
- Halsey – vocals (11), background vocals (11, 13)
- Bibby – engineer (1, 10, 18, 22)
- Max Lord – engineer (2, 3, 9, 12–14, 16, 17, 20, 21), mixer (3, 5, 7, 16, 19), mastering engineer (5), recording engineer (5)
- Clint Gibbs – engineer (15)
- Kalani Thompson – engineer (15)
- Lloyd "2Fly" Mizell – engineer (15, 19)
- Tyler Sheppard – engineer (15)
- Tatsuya Sato – mastering engineer (1, 3, 4, 6, 9–14, 16–19, 21, 22)
- Dale Becker – mastering engineer (15)
- Serban Ghenea – mixer (15)
- Ben Lidsky – mixer (15, 18, 20)
- Manny Marroquin – mixer (2, 4, 6, 8–14, 17, 20)
- Rafael "Come2Brazil" Fadul – mixer (7)
- Chris Galland – assistant mixer (2, 4, 6, 9, 11–14, 17, 20)
- Jeremie Inhaber – assistant mixer (2, 4, 6, 9, 11–14, 17, 20)
- Robin Florent – assistant mixer (2, 4, 6, 9, 11–14, 17, 20)
- Colt Blumenthal – assistant mixer (21)
- KhaledBeats – recording arranger (1), string arranger (10, 18, 22)
- Hylton Mowday – strings (1, 10, 18)
- Brandon Buttner – vocal producer (13)

== Charts ==
=== Weekly charts ===
2020 chart performance for Legends Never Die
Chart (2020)	Peak position
Australian Albums (ARIA)	1
Austrian Albums (Ö3 Austria)	2
Belgian Albums (Ultratop Flanders)	3
Belgian Albums (Ultratop Wallonia)	18
Canadian Albums (Billboard)	1
Czech Albums (ČNS IFPI)	1
Danish Albums (Hitlisten)	1
Dutch Albums (Album Top 100)	2
Estonian Albums (IFPI)	1
Finnish Albums (Suomen virallinen lista)	1
French Albums (SNEP)	23
German Albums (Offizielle Top 100)	4
Irish Albums (Official Charts)	1
Italian Albums (FIMI)	9
Lithuanian Albums (AGATA)	2
New Zealand Albums (RMNZ)	1
Norwegian Albums (VG-lista)	1
Scottish Albums (Official Charts)	56
Slovak Albums (IFPI)	3
Spanish Albums (Promusicae)	12
Swedish Albums (Sverigetopplistan)	3
Swiss Albums (Schweizer Hitparade)	2
UK Albums (Official Charts)	1
UK R&B Albums (Official Charts)	2
US Billboard 200	1
US Top R&B/Hip-Hop Albums (Billboard)	1

2025 chart performance for Legends Never Die
Chart (2025)	Position
Nigerian Albums (TurnTable)	51

=== Year-end charts ===
2020 year-end chart performance for Legends Never Die
Chart (2020)	Position
Australian Albums (ARIA)	13
Austrian Albums (Ö3 Austria)	41
Belgian Albums (Ultratop Flanders)	21
Belgian Albums (Ultratop Wallonia)	184
Canadian Albums (Billboard)	12
Danish Albums (Hitlisten)	17
Dutch Albums (Album Top 100)	14
Icelandic Albums (Tónlistinn)	23
Irish Albums (IRMA)	13
New Zealand Albums (RMNZ)	23
Swedish Albums (Sverigetopplistan)	25
UK Albums (OCC)	17
US Billboard 200	9
US Top R&B/Hip-Hop Albums (Billboard)	7

2021 year-end chart performance for Legends Never Die
Chart (2021)	Position
Australian Albums (ARIA)	29
Austrian Albums (Ö3 Austria)	22
Belgian Albums (Ultratop Flanders)	25
Canadian Albums (Billboard)	13
Danish Albums (Hitlisten)	24
Dutch Albums (Album Top 100)	20
German Albums (Offizielle Top 100)	95
Icelandic Albums (Tónlistinn)	72
Irish Albums (IRMA)	39
New Zealand Albums (RMNZ)	32
Norwegian Albums (VG-lista)	17
Swedish Albums (Sverigetopplistan)	82
UK Albums (OCC)	36
US Billboard 200	11
US Top R&B/Hip-Hop Albums (Billboard)	5

2022 year-end chart performance for Legends Never Die
Chart (2022)	Position
Australian Albums (ARIA)	82
Austrian Albums (Ö3 Austria)	66
Belgian Albums (Ultratop Flanders)	72
Canadian Albums (Billboard)	41
Dutch Albums (Album Top 100)	97
UK Albums (OCC)	98
US Billboard 200	38
US Top R&B/Hip-Hop Albums (Billboard)	17

2023 year-end chart performance for Legends Never Die
Chart (2023)	Position
Belgian Albums (Ultratop Flanders)	113
US Billboard 200	81
US Top R&B/Hip-Hop Albums (Billboard)	42

2024 year-end chart performance for Legends Never Die
Chart (2024)	Position
Australian Hip Hop/R&B Albums (ARIA)	48
Belgian Albums (Ultratop Flanders)	151
US Billboard 200	168

2025 year-end chart performance for Legends Never Die
Chart (2025)	Position
US Top R&B/Hip-Hop Albums (Billboard)	82

== Certifications ==
Certifications and sales for Legends Never Die
Region	Certification	Certified units/sales
Australia (ARIA)	Platinum	70,000^{‡}
Belgium (BRMA)	Platinum	20,000^{‡}
Brazil (Pro-Música Brasil)	Platinum	40,000^{‡}
Denmark (IFPI Danmark)	2× Platinum	40,000^{‡}
France (SNEP)	Gold	50,000^{‡}
Germany (BVMI)	Gold	100,000^{‡}
Italy (FIMI)	Gold	25,000^{‡}
New Zealand (RMNZ)	3× Platinum	45,000^{‡}
Poland (ZPAV)	Platinum	20,000^{‡}
United Kingdom (BPI)	Platinum	300,000^{‡}
United States (RIAA)	2× Platinum	301,000
^{‡} Sales+streaming figures based on certification alone.

== Release history ==
Release dates and formats for Legends Never Die
Region	Date	Label(s)	Format(s)	Ref.
Various	July 10, 2020	Grade A; Interscope	Digital download; streaming	
Various	October 10, 2020	Grade A; Interscope	CD; vinyl	
Japan	October 28, 2020	Universal Music Japan	CD	
