= Hate the Other Side =

2020 song by Juice Wrld and Marshmello featuring Polo G and the Kid Laroi

Song by Juice Wrld and Marshmello featuring Polo G and The Kid Laroi

from the album Legends Never Die
- Released: July 10, 2020
- Recorded: 2019–2020
- Genre: Emo rap; trap
- Length: 2:40
- Label: Grade A; Interscope; Joytime Collective; Geffen
- Songwriters: Jarad Higgins; Christopher Comstock; Charlton Howard; Taurus Bartlett; David Lynn Moody; Niles Hollowell-Dhar
- Producer: Marshmello

Visualizer
- "Hate the Other Side" on YouTube

"Hate the Other Side" is a song by American rapper Juice Wrld and American producer Marshmello featuring fellow American rapper Polo G and Australian rapper the Kid Laroi. It was released on July 10, 2020, as the ninth track from the former's posthumous third studio album Legends Never Die.

== Composition ==
Marshmello handles the guitar-driven production, followed by, as noted by Billboard's Michael Saponara, a "four-lane highway" for Juice, his protégé the Kid Laroi, and Polo G to drift into the abyss. Built around Juice's heartbreaking chorus, he gets candid about the pain from "trying to balance the love for those closest to him and securing the bag".

== Visualizer ==
In the visualizer, the artist David Garibaldi appears painting portraits of the artists. The visualizer was directed by Ricky Yee.

== Chart performance ==
The song debuted and peaked at number ten on the Billboard Hot 100, being Juice Wrld's eighth and Marshmello's third top ten entry; it also became Polo G and Laroi's highest-charting song at the time. It also debuted and peaked at number 12 in Canada and number 15 in Australia.

== Credits and personnel ==
Credits adapted from Tidal.

- Jarad Higgins – vocals, songwriting, composition
- Marshmello – songwriting, composition, production
- Charlton Howard – vocals, songwriting, composition
- Taurus Bartlett – vocals, songwriting, composition, remixing, studio personnel
- Nyles Hollowell-Dhar – songwriting, composition
- David Lynn Moody – songwriting, composition
- Manny Marroquin – mixing, studio personnel
- Chris Galland – mixing assistance, studio personnel
- Jeremie Inhaber – mixing assistance, studio personnel
- Robin Florent – mixing assistance, studio personnel
- Max Lord – engineer, studio personnel
- Tatsuya Sato – mastering, studio personnel

== Charts ==
=== Weekly charts ===
Chart (2020)	Peak position
Australia (ARIA)	15
Australia Hip Hop/R&B (ARIA)	10
Canada Hot 100 (Billboard)	12
Czech Republic Singles Digital (ČNS IFPI)	63
Greece International (IFPI)	48
Lithuania (AGATA)	83
New Zealand (Recorded Music NZ)	27
Portugal (AFP)	92
Slovakia Singles Digital (ČNS IFPI)	90
Sweden (Sverigetopplistan)	54
Switzerland (Schweizer Hitparade)	86
UK Audio Streaming (Official Charts)	25
US Billboard Hot 100	10
US Hot R&B/Hip-Hop Songs (Billboard)	8
US Rolling Stone Top 100	6

=== Year-end charts ===
Chart (2020)	Position
US Hot R&B/Hip-Hop Songs (Billboard)	98

== Certifications ==
Region	Certification	Certified units/sales
Brazil (Pro-Música Brasil)	Gold	20,000^{‡}
New Zealand (RMNZ)	Platinum	30,000^{‡}
Portugal (AFP)	Gold	5,000^{‡}
United Kingdom (BPI)	Gold	400,000^{‡}
United States (RIAA)	Platinum	1,000,000^{‡}
^{‡} Sales+streaming figures based on certification alone.
