= Righteous (song) =

2020 single by Juice Wrld

Single by Juice Wrld

from the album Legends Never Die
- Released: April 24, 2020
- Recorded: 2019
- Genre: Alternative rock; emo rap
- Length: 4:03
- Label: Grade A Productions; Interscope
- Songwriters: Jarad Higgins; Nick Mira; Ryan Vojtesak
- Producers: Nick Mira; Charlie Handsome

Juice Wrld singles chronology
"No Me Ame" (2020)	"Righteous" (2020)	"Tell Me U Luv Me" (2020)

Music video
- "Righteous" on YouTube

"Righteous" is a song by American rapper Juice Wrld. It is the first posthumous single released with him as the lead artist. It was released on April 24, 2020, via Grade A Productions through exclusive licensing to Interscope Records, as the lead single for his posthumous album, Legends Never Die.

== Background and composition ==
Juice Wrld's family announced "Righteous" would be releasing hours before it was released at midnight on April 24, 2020. Rolling Stone described the song as "pensive" and that it "addresses anxiety and trying to quell it by self-medicating while also acknowledging the cyclical addiction that ensues."

Lyrically, Juice Wrld dances around the theme of death in the song with the lyrics "Over ice, I'm freezing/Beautiful eyes, deceiving/We may die this evening/Coughing, wheezing, bleeding," and "High, I'm an anxious soul/Blood moons are my eyes, stay low/Red and black, they glow/Under attack, in my soul/When it's my time, I'll know."

Stylistically, Stereogum describes the track as a "melancholy swoon built from arpeggiated guitar riffs and moonbeam melodies; it's all smooth edges, moody textures, breathy vocals."

"Righteous" was produced by Nick Mira and Charlie Handsome. Mira has worked with Juice Wrld in the past on multiple songs, including Juice Wrld's multi-platinum-certified single, "Lucid Dreams". The song was recorded at Juice Wrld's home studio in Los Angeles.

== Music video ==
The official music video for the song was published on the same day the song was released on Juice Wrld's YouTube channel. The video was directed, shot and edited by Steve Cannon.

The first half of the video shows footage of Juice Wrld in his daily life including touring, traveling and recording at various studios. The second half of the video is an animation depicting Juice Wrld fighting his inner demons before changing forms and leaving Earth. The video concludes with him disappearing into space.

Cannon first started working with Juice Wrld in March 2018 as a photographer and videographer.

== Personnel ==
Credits adapted from Spotify.

- Jarad Higgins – vocals, composition
- Nick Mira – writer, producer
- Ryan "Charlie Handsome" Vojtesak – writer, producer

== Charts ==
=== Weekly charts ===
Chart (2020)	Peak position
Australia (ARIA)	15
Austria (Ö3 Austria Top 40)	26
Belgium (Ultratip Bubbling Under Flanders)	12
Canada Hot 100 (Billboard)	9
Czech Republic Singles Digital (ČNS IFPI)	47
Denmark (Tracklisten)	32
Estonia (Eesti Tipp-40)	8
Finland (Suomen virallinen lista)	19
France (SNEP)	186
Germany (GfK)	48
Greece (IFPI)	20
Hungary (Stream Top 40)	18
Iceland (Tónlistinn)	21
Ireland (IRMA)	7
Italy (FIMI)	76
Lithuania (AGATA)	20
Netherlands (Single Top 100)	38
New Zealand (Recorded Music NZ)	14
Norway (VG-lista)	20
Portugal (AFP)	41
Sweden (Sverigetopplistan)	31
Switzerland (Schweizer Hitparade)	38
UK Singles (OCC)	26
UK Hip Hop/R&B (OCC)	14
US Billboard Hot 100	11
US Hot R&B/Hip-Hop Songs (Billboard)	8
US Rolling Stone Top 100	3

=== Year-end charts ===
Chart (2020)	Position
US Hot R&B/Hip-Hop Songs (Billboard)	56

== Certifications ==
Region	Certification	Certified units/sales
Australia (ARIA)	Platinum	70,000^{‡}
Brazil (Pro-Música Brasil)	Gold	20,000^{‡}
Canada (Music Canada)	Platinum	80,000^{‡}
Denmark (IFPI Danmark)	Gold	45,000^{‡}
New Zealand (RMNZ)	Platinum	30,000^{‡}
Poland (ZPAV)	Gold	25,000^{‡}
Portugal (AFP)	Gold	5,000^{‡}
United Kingdom (BPI)	Gold	400,000^{‡}
United States (RIAA)	2× Platinum	2,000,000^{‡}
^{‡} Sales+streaming figures based on certification alone.

== Release history ==
Region	Date	Format	Label	Ref.
Various	April 24, 2020	Digital download	Interscope; Grade A	
