= Conversations (song) =

2020 song by Juice Wrld

Song by Juice Wrld

from the album Legends Never Die
- Released: July 10, 2020
- Recorded: 2019
- Genre: Emo rap
- Length: 3:01
- Label: Grade A; Interscope
- Songwriters: Jarad Higgins; Ronald Spence Jr.; Gabriel Guera
- Producers: Ronny J; DJ Scheme; Nils; Ardist

Music video
- "Conversations" on YouTube

"Conversations" is a song by American rapper Juice Wrld, released on July 10, 2020, as the second track from his posthumous third studio album Legends Never Die.

== Background ==
The song's co-producer DJ Scheme said he "fought for a year to make sure this record came out some how some way". The song was the first collaboration between Scheme and Juice Wrld, alongside the unreleased track "Way Too Many". According to Scheme, the song was conceived while on tour, when Juice invited him to his hotel and asked Scheme to play a beat.

== Composition ==
The song opens with "a chilling intro", followed by, as noted by Billboard's Michael Saponara, Juice Wrld chugging the Ronny J beat "like a Red Bull and gets right to naming all of the vices that have given him trouble along with his favorite fashion brands that became a staple in his wardrobe". Juice boasts on the line "I can have my cake and eat it too", directing it to his critics who he has grown impatient with.

== Commercial performance ==
On its first day of release, the track topped the US Spotify chart and both the US and global Apple Music charts. Despite never having been released as a single, "Conversations" debuted at number seven on the Billboard Hot 100. "Conversations" was one of four other songs on Legends Never Die to reach the top 10 for the week ending July 25, 2020. The song was certified platinum in October 2021.

== Charts ==
Chart (2020)	Peak position
Australia (ARIA)	19
Canada Hot 100 (Billboard)	13
Czech Republic Singles Digital (ČNS IFPI)	42
Greece (IFPI)	42
Hungary (Stream Top 40)	36
Iceland (Tónlistinn)	28
New Zealand Hot Singles (RMNZ)	4
Portugal (AFP)	62
UK Streaming (Official Charts Company)	23
US Billboard Hot 100	7
US Hot R&B/Hip-Hop Songs (Billboard)	6
US Rolling Stone Top 100	2

== Certifications ==
Region	Certification	Certified units/sales
Brazil (Pro-Música Brasil)	Gold	20,000^{‡}
New Zealand (RMNZ)	Gold	15,000^{‡}
United Kingdom (BPI)	Silver	200,000^{‡}
United States (RIAA)	Platinum	1,000,000^{‡}
^{‡} Sales+streaming figures based on certification alone.
