= Tell Me U Luv Me =

2020 single by Juice Wrld and Trippie Redd

Single by Juice Wrld and Trippie Redd

from the album Legends Never Die
- Released: May 29, 2020
- Recorded: 2019
- Genre: Emo rap; dancehall; alternative rock
- Length: 3:00
- Label: Grade A; Interscope
- Songwriters: Jarad Higgins; Michael White IV; Nicholas Mira; Tanner Katich
- Producers: Nick Mira; OkTanner

Juice Wrld singles chronology
"Righteous" (2020)	"Tell Me U Luv Me" (2020)	"Go" (2020)

Trippie Redd singles chronology
"Excitement" (2020)	"Tell Me U Luv Me" (2020)	"Dreamer" (2020)

Music video
- "Tell Me U Luv Me" on YouTube

"Tell Me U Luv Me" is a song by American rappers Juice Wrld and Trippie Redd. It was released on May 29, 2020, through Grade A Productions under exclusive license to Interscope Records, as the second single for Juice Wrld's posthumous third studio album, Legends Never Die.

== Background ==
Juice Wrld first performed the song with Trippie Redd at a concert in late 2019. In January 2020, "Tell Me U Luv Me" was leaked on SoundCloud before being taken down on copyright grounds. In February, the track resurfaced on YouTube. Later, Trippie Redd and Juice Wrld's label both took to Instagram to tease the track a few hours before it was officially released.

The song was released on the birthday of Juice's girlfriend Ally Lotti, who teased lines from the track in less than an hour prior to its release. Juice Wrld finished the last verse for the song only a few days prior to his passing.

== Music video ==
The official music video was released on May 28, 2020. Directed by Cole Bennett, it is filmed in half-animation and half-live action, and features sketches and drawings of "high school doodles". Trippie Redd is shown performing against a "crumpled-up paper background", while Juice appears via archive footage from his old music videos, which were also filmed and directed by Bennett. The video also shows clips of Juice Wrld's girlfriend, Ally Lotti, rapping some of Juice's parts in the video. At The End Of The Video, Bennet Gives a Tribute to the late rapper. He also honors him by adding the "Legends Never Die" Phrase, which was made up by Higgins in his Posthumous Album Legends Never Die (Juice Wrld album).

== Charts ==
Chart performance for "Tell Me U Luv Me"
Chart (2020)	Peak position
Australia (ARIA)	51
Canada Hot 100 (Billboard)	40
Lithuania (AGATA)	47
New Zealand Hot Singles (RMNZ)	2
Portugal (AFP)	77
Sweden Heatseeker (Sverigetopplistan)	6
UK Singles (Official Charts)	56
US Billboard Hot 100	38
US Hot R&B/Hip-Hop Songs (Billboard)	15
US Hot Rap Songs (Billboard)	13
US Rhythmic Airplay (Billboard)	35
US Rolling Stone Top 100	15

== Certifications ==
Certifications for "Tell Me U Luv Me"
Region	Certification	Certified units/sales
New Zealand (RMNZ)	Gold	15,000^{‡}
United Kingdom (BPI)	Silver	200,000^{‡}
United States (RIAA)	Platinum	1,000,000^{‡}
^{‡} Sales+streaming figures based on certification alone.
