= Life's a Mess =

2020 single by Juice Wrld and Halsey

Single by Juice Wrld and Halsey

from the album Legends Never Die
- Released: July 6, 2020
- Recorded: 2019–2020
- Length: 3:22
- Label: Grade A; Interscope
- Songwriters: Jarad Higgins; Ashley Frangipane; Ryan Vojesak; Masamune Kudo
- Producers: Rex Kudo; Heavy Mellow (add.); Rick Rubin (add.)

Juice Wrld singles chronology
"Pray "Put Me Down"" (2020)	"Life's a Mess" (2020)	"Come & Go" (2020)

Halsey singles chronology
"Be Kind" (2020)	"Life's a Mess" (2020)	"I Am Not a Woman, I'm a God" (2021)

Music video
- "Life's A Mess (Visualizer)" on YouTube

"Life's a Mess II"

Juice Wrld singles chronology
"Bad Boy" (2021)	"Life's a Mess II" (2021)	"Already Dead" (2021)

Clever singles chronology
"Rolls Royce Umbrellas" (2020)	"Life's a Mess II" (2021)	"Tattoo Your Name" (2021)

Post Malone singles chronology
"Only Wanna Be with You (Pokémon 25 Version)" (2021)	"Life's a Mess II" (2021)	"I Did It" (2021)

Official audio
- "Life's a Mess II" on YouTube

"Life's a Mess" is a song by American rapper Juice Wrld and American singer Halsey. It was released on July 6, 2020, through Grade A Productions under exclusive license to Interscope Records as the third single for the former's posthumous studio album, Legends Never Die, and was later included on Halsey's Collabs EP that dropped 3 weeks after. It was released the same day that Juice Wrld's estate announced the album and the release date of it. This marks the second collaboration between the two artists, following the remix of Halsey's chart-topping single "Without Me".

== Other versions ==
On March 5, 2021, a sequel to the song called "Life's A Mess II" was released, featuring fellow American musicians Clever and Post Malone.

== Credits and personnel ==
Credits adapted from Tidal.

- Jarad Higgins – vocals, songwriting, composition
- Ashley Frangipane – vocals, songwriting, composition
- Rex Kudo – songwriting, composition, production
- Charlie Handsome – production
- Heavy Mellow – additional production
- Rick Rubin – additional production
- Ryan Vojesak – songwriting, composition
- Manny Marroquin – mixing, studio personnel
- Chris Galland – mixing assistance

== Charts ==
=== Weekly charts ===
Chart performance for "Life's a Mess"
Chart (2020)	Peak position
Australia (ARIA)	8
Austria (Ö3 Austria Top 40)	32
Belgium (Ultratip Bubbling Under Flanders)	21
Canada Hot 100 (Billboard)	10
Czech Republic Singles Digital (ČNS IFPI)	24
Denmark (Tracklisten)	33
Germany (GfK)	47
Greece (IFPI)	33
Hungary (Stream Top 40)	25
Iceland (Tónlistinn)	34
Ireland (IRMA)	11
Lithuania (AGATA)	34
Netherlands (Single Top 100)	40
New Zealand (Recorded Music NZ)	14
Norway (VG-lista)	22
Portugal (AFP)	49
Slovakia Singles Digital (ČNS IFPI)	51
Sweden (Sverigetopplistan)	26
Switzerland (Schweizer Hitparade)	58
UK Singles (Official Charts)	11
US Billboard Hot 100	9
US Hot R&B/Hip-Hop Songs (Billboard)	7
US Rolling Stone Top 100	5

Chart performance for "Life's a Mess II"
Chart (2021)	Peak position
Canada Hot 100 (Billboard)	68
New Zealand Hot Singles (RMNZ)	11
US Billboard Hot 100	97
US Hot R&B/Hip-Hop Songs (Billboard)	41

== Certifications ==
Region	Certification	Certified units/sales
New Zealand (RMNZ)	Platinum	30,000^{‡}
United Kingdom (BPI)	Silver	200,000^{‡}
United States (RIAA)	Platinum	1,000,000^{‡}
^{‡} Sales+streaming figures based on certification alone.

== Release history ==
Region	Date	Format	Label	Ref.
Various	July 6, 2020	Digital download	Interscope; Grade A	
