= Smile (Juice Wrld and the Weeknd song) =

Single by Juice Wrld and the Weeknd

from the album Legends Never Die
- Released: August 7, 2020
- Recorded: May 26, 2018 (The Weeknd's vocals in 2020)
- Genre: Hip hop; emo rap; R&B
- Length: 3:16
- Label: Grade A; Interscope
- Songwriters: Jarad Higgins; Abel Tesfaye; Nicholas Mira; Cody Rounds; Danny Snodgrass, Jr.
- Producers: Nick Mira; Cxdy; Taz Taylor

Juice Wrld singles chronology
"Wishing Well" (2020)	"Smile" (2020)	"Real Shit" (2020)

The Weeknd singles chronology
"In Your Eyes" (2020)	"Smile" (2020)	"Save Your Tears" (2020)

Music video
- "Smile" on YouTube

"Smile" is a song by American rapper and singer Juice Wrld and Canadian singer the Weeknd. It was released on August 7, 2020, as the sixth single from the former's posthumous third studio album Legends Never Die. On the day of the single's release, an updated version of the album featuring the song was released.

== Background and release ==
In mid 2018, an early demo of the track that only had Higgins' vocals on it leaked and quickly became one of his most popular leaks amongst fans. On September 10, 2019, Juice Wrld first revealed his interest in making a track with the Weeknd via Twitter, in a tweet saying "Me and The Weeknd would make a diamond record...". Nearly a month after the release of Juice Wrld's posthumous third studio album Legends Never Die, on August 4, 2020, the Weeknd announced that a collaboration between the two artists was on the way soon, tweeting out "XO + 999 Thursday Night". Shortly before the song's release, on August 6, 2020, the Weeknd announced the single's title as being "Smile", with the artist upon the song's release, later on stating that he wished Juice Wrld could be alive at the moment to celebrate the song's release. An updated version of Legends Never Die featuring the song was also released alongside the single.

== Lyrics and composition ==
The lyrics of the song revolve around Juice Wrld and the Weeknd speaking about their inner demons, heartbreak and their willingness to make sacrifices in order to make their relationship work with their partner. In the song, Juice Wrld unknowingly foreshadows and references his 2019 death through the line "Devil on my shoulder telling me I'll die soon, I don't really want that to impact you." The single's composition purposely highlights and attempts to uplift the duo's vocals, with it featuring a simple sonic bass drop that emphasizes hi-hats, timely claps, and a heavy bass drum underneath their vocals.

== Music videos ==
The lyric video for "Smile" was released alongside the song on August 7, 2020. The visual follows David Garibaldi in various shots, painting portraits of Juice Wrld and the Weeknd while the song's lyrics appear on the bottom center of the footage. An official animated video was later released on August 11, 2020, which showcases Juice Wrld and the Weeknd in the afterlife. The video contains references to previous visuals done by KDC Visions, with the music video featuring the car and landscape from the official video of the song "Wishing Well".

== Commercial performance ==
The single charted within the top 40 of various nations worldwide, with it reaching the top ten in Australia, Canada, and the United States.

== Credits and personnel ==
Credits adapted from Tidal.

- Jarad Higgins – vocals, songwriting, composition
- Abel Tesfaye – vocals, songwriting, composition
- Taz Taylor – songwriting, composition, production
- Cxdy – songwriting, composition, production
- Nicholas Mira – songwriting, composition, production

== Charts ==
=== Weekly charts ===
Chart (2020)	Peak position
Australia (ARIA)	8
Austria (Ö3 Austria Top 40)	39
Belgium (Ultratop 50 Flanders)	48
Canada Hot 100 (Billboard)	7
Czech Republic Singles Digital (ČNS IFPI)	27
Denmark (Tracklisten)	24
Finland (Suomen virallinen lista)	17
France (SNEP)	152
Germany (GfK)	57
Global 200 (Billboard)	49
Greece (IFPI)	23
Hungary (Stream Top 40)	15
Iceland (Tónlistinn)	22
Ireland (IRMA)	14
Lithuania (AGATA)	15
Netherlands (Single Top 100)	47
New Zealand (Recorded Music NZ)	12
Norway (VG-lista)	16
Portugal (AFP)	32
Scotland Singles (OCC)	49
Singapore (RIAS)	14
Slovakia Singles Digital (ČNS IFPI)	32
Sweden (Sverigetopplistan)	17
Switzerland (Schweizer Hitparade)	42
UK Singles (OCC)	23
US Billboard Hot 100	8
US Hot R&B/Hip-Hop Songs (Billboard)	5
US Rolling Stone Top 100	2

=== Year-end charts ===
Chart (2020)	Position
US Hot R&B/Hip-Hop Songs (Billboard)	77

== Certifications ==
Region	Certification	Certified units/sales
Brazil (Pro-Música Brasil)	Platinum	40,000^{‡}
New Zealand (RMNZ)	Platinum	30,000^{‡}
Portugal (AFP)	Gold	5,000^{‡}
United Kingdom (BPI)	Silver	200,000^{‡}
United States (RIAA)	Platinum	1,000,000^{‡}
^{‡} Sales+streaming figures based on certification alone.

== Release history ==
Region	Date	Format	Label(s)	Ref.
Various	August 7, 2020	Digital download; streaming	Grade A; Interscope	
