= Jetski (song) =

Single by Internet Money, Lil Mosey and Lil Tecca

Single by Internet Money, Lil Mosey and Lil Tecca
- Released: March 26, 2021
- Genre: Pop rap; trap
- Length: 2:45
- Label: Internet Money; 10K
- Songwriters: Lathan Echols; Tyler-Justin Anthony Sharpe; Nicholas Mira; Nico Baran; Danny Snodgrass, Jr.; Kim Candilora
- Producers: Nick Mira; Nico Baran; Taz Taylor; KC Supreme

Internet Money singles chronology
"Hey!" (2020)	"Jetski" (2021)	"His & Hers" (2021)

Lil Mosey singles chronology
"Try Me" (2021)	"Jetski" (2021)	"Pass Out" (2021)

Lil Tecca singles chronology
"Dolly" (2020)	"Jetski" (2021)	"Show Me Up" (2021)

Music video
- "Jetski" on YouTube

"Jetski" (stylized in all caps) is a single by American record label Internet Money and American rappers Lil Mosey and Lil Tecca. The song was released on March 26, 2021, and features "glossy" production by Nick Mira. It marks the first official collaboration between the artists, as well as signalling the end of an ongoing feud between Mosey and Tecca, which dated back to 2019. The song was released as Internet Money's first single of 2021. Although failing to chart on the US Billboard Hot 100, it managed to peak at number 19 on the US Bubbling Under the Hot 100 and number 88 on the Canadian Hot 100, going on to be Lil Mosey’s most successful release post "Blueberry Faygo", his 2020 hit single.

== Background ==
On March 15, 2021, Internet Money announced the track's release date with an Instagram post, with Mosey and Tecca putting up individual stories on their own Instagram accounts over the next few days to promote the song. The song was released two weeks later on March 26. Although this is the first official collaboration between the artists, it is not Internet Money's first run-in with either artist. Mosey had previously featured on "Lost Me" alongside fellow American rappers Iann Dior and Lil Skies in 2020, a song from Internet Money's debut studio album B4 the Storm. Tecca had also worked with Internet Money multiple times before, notably on Internet Money's 2019 debut single "Somebody" alongside American rapper A Boogie wit da Hoodie, as well as "Out of Love", the lead single for Tecca's debut studio album Virgo World.

The release of "Jetski" came as a surprise to many fans as Mosey and Tecca had been rumoured to be at loggerheads since 2019, after "trolls on social media tried to pit the two against each other" in the early stages of their careers. This resulted in "various subliminals being fired on both sides", and both rappers had indirectly addressed the beef on social media since then. Interestingly, Mosey and Tecca have actually worked with each other before prior to "Jetski", on an unreleased song titled "Regular", and have even fully recorded a music video for it.

== Composition ==
The song features an infectious guitar melody in the instrumental, laden with "bouncy" and "summer vibes", and follows a "similar structure" to Internet Money's 2020 hit single "Lemonade". The track finds Lil Mosey and Lil Tecca "trading bars" and "bragging about their individual successes", and follows them "bouncing through bragadoccio verses about Bentleys, knee-high stacks of money, and traveling to Ibiza, with a sticky and unforgettable chorus". Mosey opens up the track with the hook “Yeah, they tryna ride the wave like a jet-ski/100 bitches on my line tryna sext me/Yeah, my pockets gettin’ full, gettin’ hefty”, while Tecca comes in on the first verse rapping about his money aspirations with lines such as, “I’m countin’ seven, yeah, I want like three more figures/And with all the baddies, I'ma be the same old nigga/They gon’ hate you now, that’s how the game go, nigga/They ain’t in my mind, lil’ bitch, yeah, I’m a go-getter." The song was described as having "all the makings of a smash hit", and one that could "do wonders to cement the careers of Lil Mosey and Lil Tecca as superstars for years to come" with the "right treatment on the promotional side".

== Music video ==
An accompanying music video directed by Omar Jones was released a day later on Internet Money's YouTube channel. It sees the rappers "enjoy their time living lavishly in the sun". The music video has amassed over 23 million views to date.

== Charts ==
Chart (2021)	Peak position
Canada Hot 100 (Billboard)	88
New Zealand Hot Singles (RMNZ)	16
US Bubbling Under Hot 100 (Billboard)	19
US Rhythmic Airplay (Billboard)	38
