= We All We Needed =

Studio album by Internet Money
- Released: August 14, 2026
- Genre: Hip-hop
- Length: 37:46
- Labels: Internet Money; Mercury Records
- Producers: Brav06; Cxdy; EasyMoneyCaleb, Georgie; Jayms; JimmelJimmie; KC Supreme; Kferno; Maaly Raw; MaxFlames; Nash; Pilot; Project4Play; Ripsodivine; Tjay; Zaan; Taz Taylor (exec.)

Internet Money chronology
We All We Got (2022)	We All We Needed (2026)

Singles from We All We Needed
- 1. "556" Released: July 24, 2026

We All We Needed (stylized in all caps) is the second studio album by American hip-hop collective and record label Internet Money. It was released on August 14, 2026 via Internet Money Records and Mercury Records.

Serving as their first album release since their 2020 project, B4 The Storm, We All We Needed has a total of twenty tracks and has guest appearances from Sir Untre, Unitus, Lade, and BabyBartier.

== Background and release ==
Before the release of the album, Internet Money founder Taz Taylor spoke on the design of the project, stating how the project is an "expression of confidence in the group before wider recognition arrives". Taylor also further explained how he didn't want to rush the process and how he wants to work with artists who he believes he wants to hear it from. On July 24, 2026, Internet Money would release the album's lead single, titled "556", with Babybartier and Sir Untre.

The album would officially release on August 14, 2026, it arrives on the anniversary of Internet Money's breakthrough hit "Lemonade". Alongside the album's release, a music video for "Flexed Up" would also concurrently release at the same time.

== Composition and lyricism ==
We All We Needed is a hip hop album; it has twenty tracks and has features from Sir Untre, Unitus, Lade, and BabyBartier.

The album starts with "Lambo, Maybach & Black Truck" which sees the trio of Sir Untre, BabyBartier, and Unitus boast their luxurious vehicles over a Nash instrumental. "Helly" sees the same trio approach a Cxdy instrumental to rap about keeping it down for their "rebels". On "Flexed Up", the same trio once again approaches a instrumental filled with 808s and synthesizers to rap about drug use. On "No Problems", BabyBartier expands on the song title and raps about not dealing with the music industry and personal issues. On "Tellin Lies", Unitus raps about using his money differently compared to his contemporaries. "Monster" is a rage track which sees BabyBartier and Untre trade verses. "Home" sees Untre take to his own to rap about leaving poverty; "Medusa" sees Untre and BabyBartier reunite and rap over a Project4Play instrumental about topically getting "gangsta shit" together.

On "Yellow", BabyBartier raps about consuming lean while "Pop Tags" sees Unitus and BabyBartier rap about sexual intercourse over synthesizers and hi-hats. On "Ceiling", BabyBartier raps over a bell-laden instrumental about accumulating money. At the same time, "Steve Nash" sees him reference the player while mentioning his team, the Phoenix Suns. On "556", BabyBartier and Sir Untre approach an instrumental which sees the duo violently rap over synth layers in courtesy of Maaly Raw. Writing for AllMusic, Andy Kellman called the track an aggressive one. On "Do The Most", Unitus raps about women and his lavish lifestyle, On "Sing" Lade and Untre, Lade takes to the verse to rap a bout "gangsta shit" while "Down" sees Untre, Unitus, and BabyBartier talk about cutting ties with "promiscuous women who have "no swag" over a Zaan instrumental. On "Words Don't Hurt, Bullets Do", Untre violently raps about using violence as a solution. On "Whole Lot", BabyBartier raps about having too much of one product- showcasing his wealth and what he can buy with it. On "I Love", Untre raps about how he enjoys the sound of hearing gunfire while the closing track "Mojo" sees Unitus, BabyBartier, and Lade talk about getting drugs off a boat.

== Critical reception ==
Professional ratings
Review scores
Source	Rating
LegendsNeverDie	3.5/5
HipHopDrops	2.5/5 stars
RapReviews	6/10

Upon release, We All We Needed drew positive reviews from music critics, who praised the project's "new generation" direction. A reviewer from LegendsNeverDie rated the project a 3.5 out of five, writing that BabyBartier, Lade, and Sir Untre deliver some of the "hungriest" performances while praising the music production throughout the project. A reviewer from HipHopDrops rated the project a 2.5 out of 5, writing that the project's mixing is "crisp", the melodies are "sticky", and the chemistry between the artists elevates the project beyond just "another average trap tape."

== Track listing ==
Credits adapted from Spotify and Tidal.

We All We Needed track listing
No.	Title	Writer(s)	Producer(s)	Length
1.	"Lambo, Maybach, and Black Truck" (featuring BabyBartier, Sir Untre, Unitus)	Internet Money; Brandon Briscoe; Kemontre Fitzpatrick; Untius Beatty; Nathan Scott Lamarche; Kim Candilora II; Danny Lee Snodgrass, Jr.	KC Supreme; Nash	2:00
2.	"Helly" (featuring BabyBartier, Unitus, & Sir Untre)	Briscoe; Beatty; Fitzpatrick; Cody H. Rounds; Jack Baker; Trey Hedderly; Snodgrass	Cxdy; Tjay; Taz Taylor	2:01
3.	"Flexed Up" (featuring Unitus, Sir Untre, & BabyBartier)	Briscoe; Beatty; Fitzpatrick; Rounds; Baker; Hedderly; Snodgrass	Cxdy; Tjay	1:34
4.	"No Problem" (featuring BabyBartier)	Briscoe; Anthony Ray Fontonette Jr.; Snodgrass	Brav06	1:51
5.	"Tellin' Lies" (featuring Unitus)	Beatty; Quincy Germany; Kore Jeremiah; Snodgrass	Pilot; Kferno	1:49
6.	"Monster" (featuring BabyBartier & Sir Untre)	Briscoe; Fitzpatrick; Snodgrass; Elliot Cadeau	Ripsodivine	1:39
7.	"Home" (featuring Sir Untre)	Fitzpatrick; Cadeau; Snodgrass	Ripsodivine	1:51
8.	"Medusa" (featuring BabyBartier & Sir Untre)	Briscoe; Fitzpatrick; Snodgrass; Jordan McDonald	Project4Play	1:51
9.	"Yellow" (featuring BabyBartier)	Briscoe; Snodgrass; Jimmy Armstrong	JimmelJimmie	1:45
10.	"Pop Tags" (featuring Unitus & BabyBartier)	Beatty; Briscoe; Fontonette; Snodgrass	Brav06	1:45
11.	"Ceiling" (featuring BabyBartier)	Briscoe; Snodgrass; James Marshall Bice	Jayms	1:41
12.	"Steve Nash" (featuring BabyBartier)	Briscoe; Lamarche; Snodgrass; Salvino; George Thomas Harrison	Nash; Georgie	1:48
13.	"556" (featuring BabyBartier & Sir Untre)	Briscoe; Fitzpatrick; Sodgrass; Jamaal Talib Henry; Max Rafael	Maaly Raw; MaxFlames	1:40
14.	"Do The Most" (featuring Unitus)	Beatty; Snodgrass; Rounds; Baker	Cxdy; Tjay	1:38
15.	"Sing" (featuring Sir Untre & Lade)	Fitzpatrick; Snodgrass; Fontonette; Zaire Poole	Brav06	1:47
16.	"Down" (featuring BabyBartier, Unitus, & Sir Untre)	Briscoe; Beatty; Fitzpatrick; Snodgrass; Caleb Rollins; Azzan Nasir Porter	EasyMoneyCaleb; Zaan	2:30
17.	"Words Don't Hurt, Bullets Do" (featuring Sir Untre)	Fitzpatrick; Snodgrass; Fontonette	Brav06	1:39
18.	"Whole Lot" (featuring BabyBartier)	Briscoe; Snodgrass; Harrison	Georgie	2:09
19.	"I Love" (featuring Sir Untre)	Fitzpatrick; Snodgrass; Lamarche	Nash	1:46
20.	"Mojo" (featuring Unitus, Lade, & Sir Untre)	Fitzpatrick; Briscoe; Poole; Snodgrass; Rounds; Baker	Cxdy; Tjay	2:55
Total length:				37:46

=== Notes ===
- All tracks are stylized in all caps

=== Personnel ===
- Edgard Noel Herrera - mixing, mastering
