= Whipski =

Single by Snot featuring Lil Skies and Internet Money

Single by Snot featuring Lil Skies and Internet Money
- Released: April 8, 2021
- Genre: Trap
- Length: 3:03
- Label: 300
- Songwriters: Edy Edouard; Kimetrius Foose; Danny Snodgrass, Jr.; Nathan Lamarche; Cody Rounds
- Producers: Taz Taylor; Nash Beats; Cxdy

Snot singles chronology
"Calabasas" (2021)	"Whipski" (2021)	"Tell Em" (2021)

Lil Skies singles chronology
"Not the Same" (2021)	"Whipski" (2021)	"My Baby" (2021)

Internet Money singles chronology
"Superstar" (2021)	"Whipski" (2021)	"Baby Choppa" (2021)

Music video
- "Whipski" on YouTube

"Whipski" is a song by American rapper Snot featuring fellow American rapper Lil Skies and American record label/production collective Internet Money. It was released on April 8, 2021, with an accompanying music video.

== Background ==
Prior to its release, the song was teased for a while. It gained higher anticipation when it was revealed that Cole Bennett would be directing the visual.

== Composition ==
The song finds Snot rapping about driving in a car and partying with a girl over a guitar instrumental.

== Music video ==
The music video was released on April 8, 2021, through Bennett's Lyrical Lemonade channel. It depicts Snot and Lil Skies as employees at an automobile repair shop. They catch their boss sleeping, attack him and take a van for a joyride. The van breaks down, but Snot solves the problem by turning it into a vintage BMW with a magic wrench. However, the boss appears and burns down the car with a flamethrower, and is hit by a passing vehicle. A pair of purple alien girls show up and give the rappers a ride, with something in store for them.

== Charts ==
Chart (2021)	Peak position
New Zealand Hot Singles (RMNZ)	13
US Bubbling Under Hot 100 Singles (Billboard)	25
