= Poorstacy =

American musician (1999–2025)

- Born: Carlito Junior Milfort; March 15, 1999; Palm Beach, Florida, U.S.
- Died: December 1, 2025 (aged 26) Boca Raton, Florida, U.S.
- Cause of death: Suicide by gunshot
- Genres: Emo rap; post-punk; punk rock; punk rap; dance-punk
- Instruments: Vocals; guitar; piano; bass guitar
- Years active: 2019–2025
- Labels: 10K Projects; Internet Money

Carlito Junior Milfort (March 15, 1999 – December 1, 2025), known professionally as Poorstacy (stylized in all caps), was an American musician from Palm Beach, Florida. His music merged influences from hip-hop, punk rock, and heavy metal. He released two studio albums, two EPs, and was featured on the Grammy Award nominated Bill & Ted Face the Music soundtrack.

== Life and career ==
Carlito Junior Milfort was born in Palm Beach, Florida. His father taught him multiple instruments as a child. He was inspired to listen to rock music and play guitar through playing Guitar Hero. Early in life, he was inspired by his local metalcore as well as the underground Miami hip-hop scene. He soon began performing live with his band in the local heavy metal, punk rock and gothic rock scenes. He soon began uploading music online, particularly on SoundCloud.

Originally performing under several pseudonyms, including Lito Xantana, Vizion and Scarybrats, he eventually took on the stage name "Poorstacy" in reference to skater Stacy Peralta. His explanation for the name was that "Stacy Peralta himself was not shown a lot of attention at the start, but he ended up being one of the biggest legends in skateboarding in the end. I always loved the idea of that, of doing your own thing and having it pay off".

Milfort's song "Make Up", uploading to SoundCloud in March 2019 received 35,000 views in one day. On September 13 of the same year, his debut EP I Don't Care, produced by Nick Mira, was released through Internet Money Records, Milfort was featured on the song "Urself" from Iann Dior's debut album Industry Plant, released on November 8, 2019.

On January 31, 2020, he released the song "I Can't Sleep" featuring Iann Dior as a single. His debut album, The Breakfast Club was originally planned to be released on February 7, through 10K Projects. The album's track "Darkness" was released as a single on March 6, and the album was then released on March 13, 2020. On June 12, he was featured on the song "Headspace" by the band Fame on Fire. On June 21, he released the single "Choose Life", featuring Travis Barker. With a title taken from a monologue from the film Trainspotting, the song was a departure from emo rap and into punk rock.

On July 26, a deluxe version of The Breakfast Club was released with three bonus tracks, "Choose Life", "Don't Go Outside", and "Don't Look at Me", featuring Whethan. Milfort's song "Darkest Night" was featured on the soundtrack for Bill & Ted Face the Music released on August 28, 2020. The soundtrack was eventually nominated for a Grammy Award. On September 20, he independently released a mini EP through SoundCloud, titled I Don't Rap, his first release to entirely consist of rapping and no singing.

On November 13, he released the single "Nothing Left". On December 11, he released the single "Hills Have Eyes", both featuring Travis Barker. On May 21, 2021, he released the single "Public Enemy" which was accompanied by a music video. On July 9, 2021, he released the post-hardcore song "Children of the Dark", along with a music video, and announced that his second studio album Party at the Cemetery was set to be released in the fall of that year. On August 13, he released the single "Party at the Cemetery".

=== Death ===
On November 29, 2025, while staying at a motel with his son and the child's mother in Boca Raton, Florida, Milfort shot himself in the head and was rushed to a local hospital. He died two days later after being taken off life support. He was 26 years old.

The woman stated that she and Milfort used drugs during their stay at the motel, and that on the night of November 28–29 they began to argue, which led to Milfort hitting her and threatening to shoot her or himself with a gun. She was arrested for child neglect.

== Musical style and influence ==
His music has been described as emo rap, dance-punk, post-punk punk rap and punk rock, often incorporating elements of post-hardcore, grunge, alternative rock, pop-punk and gothic rock. Musician Oliver Tree stated in an article for Billboard that Milfort "is making his own new wave of emo alternative".

A March 2021 article by Alternative Press writer Alex Darus described his music as "taking edgy SoundCloud rap and giving it a gritty pop-punk spin" and as "combin[ing] rap and pop-punk but also steady emo, dreamy indie and catchy pop to make a sound all his own". Another article by the magazine described how "Making his appearance during the rise of SoundCloud rap, Milfort sets himself apart from other trap artists with his non-conformist approach to genre and the result is a fusion of different vibes created with stark enginuity". Revolver writer Eli Enis described his sound as "Eschewing booming 808s for a rubbery electro-punk groove".

His musical influences included the Sisters of Mercy, Billy Idol, XXXTentacion, the Kooks, the Strokes, My Chemical Romance, Pierce the Veil, AFI, Slipknot, Earl Sweatshirt and Flatbush Zombies, and lyrical narrative influences including V for Vendetta, Trainspotting and Halloween. He was cited by Yungblud as an influence on his 2020 album Weird!.

== Discography ==
=== Studio albums ===
| Title | Album details |
|---|---|
| The Breakfast Club | Released: March 13, 2020; Label: 10K Projects; Format: Digital download, streaming |
| Party at the Cemetery | Released: October 8, 2021; Label: 10K Projects; Format: Digital download, streaming |

=== Extended plays ===
| Title | EP details |
|---|---|
| I Don't Care | Released: September 13, 2019; Label: Internet Money; Format: Digital download, streaming |
| I Don't Rap | Released: September 20, 2020; Label: Independent; Format: Digital download |

=== Singles ===
==== As lead artist ====
| Title | Year | Album |
|---|---|---|
| "I Can't Sleep" (featuring Iann Dior) | 2020 | The Breakfast Club |
| "Darkness" | 2020 | The Breakfast Club |
| "Choose Life" (featuring Travis Barker) | 2020 | The Breakfast Club: Deluxe Edition |
| "Love Spells" | 2020 | Non-album singles |
| "Nothing Left" (featuring Travis Barker) | 2020 | Non-album singles |
| "Hills Have Eyes" (featuring Travis Barker) | 2020 | Non-album singles |
| "Public Enemy" | 2021 | Non-album singles |
| "Children of the Dark" | 2021 | Party at the Cemetery |
| "Party at the Cemetery" | 2021 | Party at the Cemetery |
| "Abuse Me" (featuring The Requiem) | 2022 | Non-album single |

==== As featured artist ====
| Title | Artist | Year |
|---|---|---|
| "Urself" | Iann Dior | 2019 |
| "Lately" | Lil Playah | 2020 |
| "Headspace" | Fame on Fire | 2020 |
| "Bottle of Rain" | Kayzo | 2022 |
