= Doja =

Doja may refer to:

== Music ==
- Doja Cat (born 1995), American rapper and singer
- "Doja" (Snot and ASAP Rocky song), 2022
- "Doja" (Central Cee song), 2022

== Other ==
- DoJa, a Java application environment specification
- "Doja", slang for cannabis

== See also ==
- Dojo
