= Blastoff (Internet Money song) =

2020 song by Internet Money, Diplo and Trippie Redd featuring Juice Wrld

Song by Internet Money, Diplo and Trippie Redd featuring Juice Wrld

from the album B4 the Storm
- Released: August 28, 2020
- Recorded: 2018–2019
- Length: 2:54
- Label: Internet Money; TenThousand
- Songwriters: Jarad Higgins; Michael White IV; Danny Snodgrass, Jr; Nicholas Mira; Henry Nichols; Kim Candilora II; William Repko II; Thomas Wesley Pentz; David Karbal
- Producers: Nick Mira; Taz Taylor; Pharaoh Vice; Repko; KC Supreme; Diplo; Aryay

Music video
- "Blastoff" on YouTube

"Blastoff" is a song by American hip hop collective and record label Internet Money, American DJ and music producer Diplo and American rapper Trippie Redd featuring late fellow American rapper Juice Wrld. It was released on August 28, 2020, as the second track from Internet Money's debut album B4 the Storm. An emotionally-driven melodic song, it sees the artists crooning about their past relationships. The song is a reworked version of a leaked track called "Tragedy".

== Background and recording ==
The song initially leaked under the title "Tragedy", with a different beat. One of the song's producer's, Nick Mira, also produced Juice Wrld's breakout hit, "Lucid Dreams". Mira recalled that "Blastoff" was done at least a year prior to its release. The song went through over 40 versions with different mixes and layouts tried out. Co-producer and Internet Money founder Taz Taylor said it "meant something" to him to have Juice on the album, as it was the final song they worked on. Taylor was working on "Blastoff" just a day before Juice's death, and called his verse "crazy". Originally, Juice and Trippie Redd's other collaboration, "6 Kiss", was to be included on B4 the Storm, however that track was instead released in November 2019.

== Composition ==
A soulful, melodic song, "Blastoff" contains a "delicate, Spanish guitar approach" laid over Juice Wrld's "heartbroken", "emotional" lyrics: "I should've turned away when I found out you were demonic / Let's be honest, you're the devil's daughter".

== Critical reception ==
In NME's album review, Kyann-Sian Williams stated: "Luckily the lower half of B4 the Storm is more cohesive than the top, a run that begins with a great display of braggadocio from the late Juice Wrld (aka Jarad Higgins) and Redd. The duo's chemistry has been undeniable – take their viral TikTok viral hit '6 Kiss' – and 'Blastoff' perfectly showcases their interconnected talents". HotNewHipHop's Mitch Findlay deemed the song a "bittersweet standout" from the album and said the duo make a compelling team. Jessica McKinney of Complex named it among the Best New Music of the Week, noting how the artists reflect on their past relationships.

== Charts ==
Chart (2020)	Peak position
Canada (Canadian Hot 100)	63
Global 200 (Billboard)	155
New Zealand Hot Singles (RMNZ)	5
Sweden Heatseeker (Sverigetopplistan)	14
UK Singles (OCC)	90
US Billboard Hot 100	79
US Hot R&B/Hip-Hop Songs (Billboard)	26
US Rolling Stone Top 100	30

== Certifications ==
Region	Certification	Certified units/sales
Canada (Music Canada)	Platinum	80,000^{‡}
New Zealand (RMNZ)	Gold	15,000^{‡}
United States (RIAA)	Platinum	1,000,000^{‡}
^{‡} Sales+streaming figures based on certification alone.
