= Pain 3 =

Mixtape by Derez De'Shon
- Released: August 21, 2020
- Genre: Hip hop
- Length: 57:57
- Labels: Commission; BMG
- Producers: ADP; Boobie; Dez Wright; Don Salute; Drumma Boy; JR Hitmaker; K Rich; Kzuni; London on da Track; Off The Wall; Platinum Libraries; Roark Bailey; SephGotTheWaves; Southside; Vou; Wavvy Pluto

Derez De'Shon chronology
Pain 2 (2018)	Pain 3 (2020)	Bigger Than Me (2022)

Singles from Pain 3
- 1. "Calm Down" Released: August 7, 2020

Pain 3 is a mixtape by American rapper Derez De'Shon. It was released on August 21, 2020, through Commission Music and BMG Rights Management. The mixtape features guest appearances from A Boogie wit da Hoodie, Boosie Badazz, G 5aby, Paxquiao and Ralo. The production on the mixtape was handled by Southside, London on da Track, and Drumma Boy, among others.

The mixtape was supported by the one and only single: "Calm Down". The mixtape serves as a sequel to the 2018 album Pain 2, and the third installment of the Pain series. The album charted at number 10 on the US Heatseekers Albums chart. This project marks as Derez's final release under the BMG and Commission label imprints.

== Release and promotion ==
=== Singles ===
On February 7, 2020, Derez De'Shon released two songs — "How Many Shots" and "Party Pack". The music video for the song "How Many Shots", was released on May 29, 2020. Both songs was not included on the mixtape.

The mixtape's one and only single, "Calm Down", was released on August 7, 2020. The music video for the song was released on August 21, 2020, on the same day as the mixtape's release.

=== Music videos ===
The music video for the song "Trappin Out da Mansion", was released on August 24, 2020, two days after the mixtape's release. The second music video, "No Mo Pain", was released on August 28, 2020. The third music video, "Get the Money", was released on September 4, 2020. The fourth music video, "Alot Changed", was released on September 9, 2020. The fifth and last music video, "Mental", was released on September 18, 2020.

== Commercial performance ==
On September 5, 2020, Pain 3 debuted at number 10 on the US Heatseekers Albums chart, making Derez De'Shon first top-10 project on the chart.

== Track listing ==
Credits adapted by Tidal and Genius.

Pain 3 track listing
No.	Title	Writer(s)	Producer(s)	Length
1.	"Autopilot"	Derez Lenard; Joseph Boyden; Jabrielle Brooks	SephGotTheWaves; JR Hitmaker	3:44
2.	"Schizophrenic"	Lenard; Hector Chapparo; June Jonez; Johnny Homen	Off The Wall; Platinum Libraries^{[a]}	3:19
3.	"No Mo Pain"	Lenard; Joshua Luellen	Southside	2:40
4.	"Yea Yea" (featuring A Boogie wit da Hoodie)	Lenard; Artist Dubose; London Holmes; Chaparro; Roark Bailey	London on da Track; Off The Wall; Roark Bailey^{[b]}	3:05
5.	"Special"	Lenard; Holmes; Dylan Clearly-Krell; Aubrey Robinson	London on da Track; Dez Wright; Boobie	2:40
6.	"Trappin Out da Mansion"	Lenard; Holmes; Chaparro	London on da Track; Off The Wall	2:05
7.	"Get The Money" (featuring Boosie Badazz)	Lenard; Terrence Hatch; Luellen	Southside	2:50
8.	"Active"	Lenard; Kevin Richardson; Jonez	K Rich	2:51
9.	"Everything I Love"	Lenard; Chaparro; Jonez	Off The Wall	3:00
10.	"Calm Down"	Lenard; Jarus Kelsey	Wavy Pluto	2:31
11.	"Permanent Skarz" (featuring G 5aby & Paxquiao)	Lenard; Kendall Bailey; Michael Kendall; Ashton Lowery; Richardson; Robinson; Bailey	K Rich; Boobie; Roark Bailey^{[b]}	3:31
12.	"It's Up"	Lenard; Holmes; Joas Valentino Kaissoun	London on da Track; Kzuni	2:43
13.	"Wake Up" (featuring Ralo)	Lenard; Terrell Davis; Holmes	London on da Track	3:08
14.	"Alot Changed"	Lenard; Christopher Gholson	Drumma Boy	3:27
15.	"Right Now"	Lenard; Amish Dilipkumar	ADP	3:16
16.	"Mental"	Lenard; Luellen	Southside	2:39
17.	"What's Changed"	Lenard; Richardson; Jonez	K Rich	3:02
18.	"Hard To Luv"	Lenard; Holmes; Ugar Tig	London on da Track; Vou	3:35
19.	"Burn It Down"	Lenard; Lajuan Raines; Taye Wilson; Von Wilson	Don Salute	3:51
Total length:				57:57

=== Notes ===
- ^{^[a]} signifies an uncredited co-producer
- ^{^[b]} signifies an additional producer

== Personnel ==
Credits adapted from Tidal.

=== Vocalists ===
- Derez De'Shon – primary artist
- A Boogie wit da Hoodie – featured artist (track 4)
- Boosie Badazz – featured artist (track 7)
- G 5aby – featured artist (track 11)
- Paxquiao – featured artist (track 11)
- Ralo – featured artist (track 13)

=== Production ===
- SephGotTheWaves – producer (track 1)
- JR Hitmaker – producer (track 1)
- Off The Wall – producer (tracks 2, 4, 6 and 9)
- Platinum Libraries – uncredited co-producer (track 2)
- Southside – producer (tracks 3, 7, 16)
- London on da Track – producer (tracks 4–6, 12, 13 and 18)
- Roark Bailey – additional producer (tracks 4 and 11)
- Dez Wright – producer (track 5)
- Boobie – producer (tracks 5 and 11)
- K Rich – producer (tracks 8, 11 and 17)
- Wavy Pluto – producer (track 10)
- Kzuni – producer (track 12)
- Drumma Boy – producer (track 14)
- ADP – producer (track 15)
- Vou – producer (track 18)
- Don Salute – producer (track 19)

=== Technical ===
- Glenn Schick – engineer (all tracks)
- KY – engineer (tracks 1 and 15)
- June Jonez – engineer (tracks 2–14, 16–19)
- Roark Bailey – engineer (tracks 2–14, 16–19)

== Charts ==
Chart performance for Pain 3
Chart (2020)	Peak position
US Heatseekers Albums (Billboard)	10
