= Hardaway (song) =

2017 single by Derez De'Shon

Single by Derez De'Shon

from the album Pain 2
- Released: April 8, 2017
- Length: 3:56
- Label: Commission Music
- Songwriter(s): Derez Lenard
- Producer(s): London on da Track

Derez De'Shon singles chronology
"Chose Me" (2016)	"Hardaway" (2017)	"Pain" (2017)

Alternate cover
- Alternate cover

Music video
- "Hardaway" on YouTube

"Hardaway" is a song by American rapper Derez De'Shon, first released on April 8, 2017 and followed by re-releases on streaming services in November and December 2017. Produced by London on da Track, it appears on the deluxe edition of De'Shon's debut studio album Pain 2 (2018) and is considered his breakout hit.

== Composition ==
"Hardaway" is an uptempo song that finds Derez De'Shon reflecting on his struggles and perseverance in the hard times of his life to become successful, through a performance in Auto-Tune-laced vocals.

== Release and promotion ==
The song was a sleeper hit. Its music video was released on January 15, 2018, following which the song significantly increased in popularity. It debuted on the Billboard charts Hot R&B/Hip-Hop Songs and then Hot 100 in February 2018, debuting at number 90 on the latter. According to Nielsen Music, it raked in 7 million U.S. streams (up 17 percent), 11 million radio audience impressions (up 10 percent) and 1,000 downloads sold (up 2 percent) in the week ending February 8.

== Remix ==
An official remix of the song with DJ Envy was released on March 16, 2018, after surfacing online a few weeks prior. It features American rappers 2 Chainz and Yo Gotti, who also reflect on the hardships of their respective pasts.

== Charts ==
Chart performance for "Hardaway"
Chart (2018)	Peak position
US Billboard Hot 100	61
US Hot R&B/Hip-Hop Songs (Billboard)	26
US Rhythmic (Billboard)	27
