= Pain 2 =

Studio album by Derez De'Shon
- Released: December 14, 2018
- Genre: Hip hop
- Length: 43:05
- Label: Commission; BMG
- Producer: ADP; Beezo; CashMoneyAP; Cassius Jay; DJ Chose; E-Trou; KGrayWhatitDo; London on da Track; Nick Mira; Quin with the Keyz; Shun On Da Beat; Sidepce; Stoopid Beats; Taz Taylor; TM88; Touch of Trench; Will-A-Fool; YIB

Derez De'Shon chronology
Thank Da Streets (2017)	Pain 2 (2018)	Pain 3 (2020)

Singles from Pain 2
- 1. "Beat The Odds" Released: July 13, 2018; 2. "Whaddup Doe" Released: November 16, 2018; 3. "By the Scale" Released: December 7, 2018

Pain 2 is a debut studio album by American rapper Derez De'Shon. It was released on December 14, 2018, via Commission Music and BMG Rights Management. The album features guest appearances from Yella Beezy, Lil Durk, Lil Baby, Russ, Mozzy, Dreezy, Moneybagg Yo, Trouble and YFN Lucci. Production was handled by London on da Track, Taz Taylor, DJ Chose, CashMoneyAP, Will-A-Fool, and TM88, among others. The album also serves as the second installment of the Pain series, and a sequel to his 2017 Pain mixtape. On December 29, 2018, the album peaked at number 186 on the Billboard 200.

== Singles ==
The lead single from the album, "Beat The Odds", was released on July 13, 2018. The music video for the song was released on September 6, 2018.

The second single from the album, "Whaddup Doe" featuring American rapper Mozzy, was released on November 16, 2018. The song's music video was released on January 17, 2019.

The third and final single from the album, "By the Scale", was released on December 7, 2018. The music video for the song was released on December 18, 2018.

== Commercial performance ==
On December 29, 2018, Pain 2 debuted at number 186 on the US Billboard 200 chart, which became Derez's first chart entry. Plus, the album debuted at number 17 on the US Heatseekers Albums and also debuted at number 42 on the US Independent Albums chart.

== Track listing ==
Credits adapted from Spotify and Tidal.

No.	Title	Writer(s)	Producer(s)	Length
1.	"Ball 2Getha" (featuring Yella Beezy)	Derez Lenard; Conway Markies; Lemarcus Wright; Quintin Gray	Quin with the Keyz; Shun On Da Beat	3:11
2.	"Wassa Friend"	Lenard; Norman Payne; Danny Snodgrass Jr.	DJ Chose; Taz Taylor	2:29
3.	"Reasonz" (featuring Lil Durk)	Lenard; Payne; Snodgrass Jr.; Trenton Turner; Durk Banks	DJ Chose; Taz Taylor; Touch of Trent	3:13
4.	"By the Scale"	Lenard; Payne; Willie Byrd	DJ Chose; Will-A-Fool	3:13
5.	"Need Sum Mo" (featuring Lil Baby)	Lenard; Dominique Jones; Brince Elam	Stoopid Beats	3:09
6.	"Fallin" (featuring Russ)	Lenard; London Holmes; Russell Vitale	London on da Track	3:05
7.	"Dark Places"	Lenard; Ryan Waldorf; Byrd	Will-A-Fool; YIB	2:36
8.	"Whaddup Doe" (featuring Mozzy)	Lenard; Holmes; Timothy Cornell	London on da Track	2:26
9.	"We Both Know"	Lenard; Snodgrass Jr.; Dorien Theus; Elias Latrou	E-Trou; Sidepce; Taz Taylor	3:30
10.	"Actin' Different" (featuring Dreezy)	Lenard; Alex Petit; Amish Patal; Seandrea Sledge	ADP; CashMoneyAP	3:18
11.	"Wanna Believe U" (featuring Moneybagg Yo)	Lenard; Byrd; DeMario White, Jr.	Will-A-Fool	3:10
12.	"Too Many Nights" (featuring Trouble)	Lenard; Bishop Grinnage; Joshua Cross; Mariel Orr	Beezo; Cassius Jay	3:14
13.	"Addin' Up"	Lenard; Payne	DJ Chose	2:53
14.	"Beat The Odds" (featuring YFN Lucci)	Lenard; Nicholas Mira; Snodgrass, Jr.; Rayshawn Bennett	Nick Mira; Taz Taylor	2:58
15.	"Crash"	Lenard; Bryan Simmons	TM88	3:30
16.	"Same Way"	Lenard; Kermit Wayne Gray Jr.; Payne	DJ Chose; KGrayWhatitDo	3:50
17.	"Lately"	Lenard; Holmes	London on da Track	2:55
Total length:				52:49

== Personnel ==
Credits were adapted from Tidal.

Vocalists
- Derez De'Shon – primary artist
- Yella Beezy – featured artist (track 2)
- Lil Durk – featured artist (track 3)
- Lil Baby – featured artist (track 5)
- Russ – featured artist (track 6)
- Mozzy – featured artist (track 8)
- Dreezy – featured artist (track 10)
- Moneybagg Yo – featured artist (track 11)
- Trouble – featured artist (track 12)
- YFN Lucci – featured artist (track 14)

Production

- Quin with the Keyz – producer (track 1)
- ShunOnDaBeat – producer (track 1)
- DJ Chose – producer (tracks 2–4, 13, 16)
- Taz Taylor – producer (tracks 2, 3, 9, 14)
- Touch of Trent – producer (track 3)
- Will-A-Fool – producer (tracks 4, 7, 11)
- Stoopid Beats – producer (track 5)
- London on da Track – producer (tracks 6, 8, 17)
- YIB – producer (track 7)
- E-Trou – producer (track 9)
- Sidepce – producer (track 9)
- ADP – producer (track 10)
- CashMoneyAP – producer (track 10)
- Beezo – producer (track 12)
- Cassius Jay – producer (track 12)
- Nick Mira – producer (track 14)
- TM88 – producer (track 15)
- KGrayWhatitDo – producer (track 16)

Technical

- Glenn Schick – mastering engineer (tracks 1–7, 9, 10, 12, 13, 15, 16)
- K.Y. – mixing engineer (tracks 1–10, 12, 13, 15–17)
- Dave Kutch – mastering engineer (track 17)

== Charts ==
Chart performance for Pain 2
Chart (2018)	Peak position
US Billboard 200	186
US Heatseekers Albums (Billboard)	17
US Independent Albums (Billboard)	42
