= Iann Dior =

American rapper and singer (born 1999)

- Also known as: Olmo; Sad Boy Dior
- Born: Michael Ian Olmo; March 25, 1999 (age 27); Arecibo, Puerto Rico
- Origin: Corpus Christi, Texas, U.S.
- Genre: Emo rap
- Occupations: Rapper; singer; songwriter
- Years active: 2019–present
- Labels: Internet Money; 10K Projects; Caroline; Big Noise
- Website: ianndior.com

Michael Ian Olmo (born March 25, 1999), known professionally as Iann Dior (stylized in all lowercase), is an American rapper and singer. He is best known for his guest appearance on 24kGoldn's 2020 single "Mood", which peaked atop the Billboard Hot 100 and remains his sole entry on the chart. He signed to Internet Money Records and 10K Projects prior to the release of his debut album, Industry Plant (2019), which was followed by On to Better Things (2022)—both of which entered the Billboard 200.

== Early life ==
Michael Ian Olmo was born on March 25, 1999, in Arecibo, Puerto Rico, to Tommy and Anabelle Olmo. He graduated high school in May 2017. Growing up, Olmo listened mostly to rap, and through his mother, some Spanish music, including Marc Anthony. He recalls how his father would listen to Jay-Z and introduce him to rock bands such as The Fray.

== Career ==
=== 2019: Career beginnings and Industry Plant ===
Fired from a job at United Parcel Service in 2019, Olmo started recording his songs on SoundCloud. Olmo's first song was "Cutthroat", which has been played over 5 million times. He subsequently released 7 other songs, one of which was "Emotions". Although it failed to chart, "Emotions" has gone on to become Olmo's second most popular and most streamed song to date. These 8 songs would make up his debut mixtape Nothings Ever Good Enough, released on May 22, 2019.

Soon after, Olmo began working on his debut studio album Industry Plant. He released "What is real" on July 3, the album's lead single. The next day, he released "Gone Girl" featuring Trippie Redd, the album's second single. Although it did not chart on the US Billboard Hot 100, it peaked at number 13 on the Official New Zealand Music Chart, becoming his third most popular song to date. On October 25, he released the third single, "Strings" featuring Gunna. Industry Plant was published on November 8, peaking at number 44 on the US Billboard 200.

=== 2020: Breakthrough and rise to fame ===
Olmo started off 2020 by releasing "Good Day" on January 24; the first single for his upcoming extended play I'm Gone. It charted at number 33 on the Official New Zealand Music Chart. On April 17, Olmo released the pop-punk track "Sick and Tired" featuring Machine Gun Kelly and Travis Barker, the EP's second single. This was a notable change of style by Olmo, with previous releases being mainly trap and emo rap. Although it did not chart on the US Billboard Hot 100, it did peak at number 15 on the US Bubbling Under Hot 100 Singles, as well as number 3 the US Hot Rock & Alternative Songs. It also charted at number 9 on the Official New Zealand Music Chart. Olmo released the EP's third single, "Prospect" featuring Lil Baby, on May 22. Although again not charting on the US Billboard Hot 100, "Prospect" peaked at number 8 on the US Bubbling Under Hot 100 Singles, number 50 on the US Hot R&B/Hip-Hop Songs, and number 27 on the Official New Zealand Music Chart. I'm Gone was published on June 12, peaking at number 45 on the US Billboard 200.

The biggest breakthrough in Olmo's career came on July 24 when he was featured on the pop rap single "Mood" by fellow American rapper 24kGoldn. The song became a commercial success after earning popularity on the video-sharing app TikTok. It peaked at number 1 on the US Billboard Hot 100, where it spent eight non-consecutive weeks, and also topped the charts in the United Kingdom, Australia, Ireland, Austria, Denmark, the Netherlands, Norway, and Sweden. To date, "Mood" has amassed over 1.35 billion Spotify streams and 326 million views on its official music video. On August 27, Olmo collaborated with record producer Internet Money, as well as Lil Mosey and Lil Skies, on "Lost Me", a song off Internet Money's debut studio album B4 the Storm. The song reached number 28 on the Official New Zealand Music Chart. Olmo was then featured on the track "nothing inside" from Machine Gun Kelly's pop-punk album Tickets To My Downfall, on September 25. "nothing inside" peaked at number 20 on the US Hot Rock & Alternative Songs. This follows the success of their previous collaboration on "Sick and Tired". On October 21, Olmo collaborated with American TikTok personality and singer Jxdn on "Tonight", the third single from Jxdn's debut studio album Tell Me About Tomorrow. "Tonight" charted at number 29 on the US Hot Rock & Alternative Songs. On October 30, Olmo was featured on "Like Me" from $NOT's second album Beautiful Havoc. A remix of "Mood" was released on November 6, featuring singers Justin Bieber and J Balvin. To end off 2020, Olmo released a non-album single "Holding On" on November 20, coming in at number 14 on the Official New Zealand Music Chart.

=== 2021–present: On to Better Things ===
On January 29, Olmo was the lead vocalist for the single "Higher" by British electronic music group Clean Bandit. Although not charting on the US Billboard Hot 100, the song peaked at number 67 on the Irish Singles Chart and number 66 on the UK Singles Chart. He then collaborated with American DJ and record producer Illenium on another single "First Time" on March 12, from Illenium's fourth studio album Fallen Embers. Although again not reaching the US Billboard Hot 100, "First Time" charted at number 23 on the US Hot Rock & Alternative Songs and number 21 on the Official New Zealand Music Chart. Two weeks later, Olmo was featured on the remix of the 2020 hit song "Heat Waves" by British indie rock band Glass Animals. On April 16, Olmo released the 2-track EP Still Here, containing "shots in the dark" featuring Trippie Redd, and "don't wanna believe". Both songs managed to chart on the Official New Zealand Music Chart, coming in at number 8 and number 34 respectively, while "shots in the dark" also peaked at number 81 on the Canadian Hot 100. In addition, "shots in the dark" served as a follow-up to the two artists' previous collaboration, "gone girl" in 2019. On August 27, Olmo was featured on the track "Seaside" from Lil Tecca's second studio album We Love You Tecca 2. It charted at number 38 on the Official New Zealand Music Chart. Olmo released his highly anticipated single "V12" featuring Lil Uzi Vert on September 14, the lead single for his second studio album On to Better Things. "V12" peaked at number 20 on the US Bubbling Under Hot 100 Singles as well as number 22 on the Official New Zealand Music Chart. The album's second single, "Let You", was released on November 12, reaching number 18 on the Official New Zealand Music Chart.

Olmo's first single of 2022 came on January 18; he released "Thought It Was" with previous collaborators Travis Barker and Machine Gun Kelly, as the album's third single. This came three days before the album's release on January 21. With this album, he experimented with "smooth pop-punk beats and rap-rock crossovers", working with Barker and Taz Taylor, among others. He described the album as more "personal" than his previous, and also directed his own music videos. Throughout 2022, Olmo embarked on the Better Things Tour which started on January 22 and concluded February 28, 2022.

== Discography ==
=== Studio albums ===
Title	Album details	Peak chart positions					
Title	Album details	US	AUS	CAN	NLD	NOR	UK
Industry Plant	Released: November 8, 2019; Label: WorldWide Records, Internet Money Records, 10K Projects; Format: Digital download, streaming	44	—	51	—	—	—
On to Better Things	Released: January 21, 2022; Label: 10K Projects; Format: Digital download, streaming	28	80	28	81	29	92
Leave Me Where You Found Me	Released: April 21, 2023; Label: Internet Money Records, 10K Projects; Format: Digital download, streaming	—	—	—	—	—	—
Cycles	Released: June 13, 2025; Label: Big Noise Music Group	—	—	—	—	—	85

=== Extended plays ===
Title	EP details	Peak chart positions		
Title	EP details	US	CAN	NZ
I'm Gone	Released: June 12, 2020; Label: Internet Money Records, 10K Projects; Format: Digital download, streaming	45	37	40
Still Here	Released: April 15, 2021; Label: 10K Projects; Format: Digital download, streaming	—	—	—
Blind	Released: March 1, 2024; Label: 10K Projects; Format: Digital download, streaming	—	—	—
Nothings Ever Good Enough II	Released: February 21, 2025; Label: Big Noise Music Group; Format: Digital download, streaming	—	—	—
"—" denotes a recording that did not chart, was not eligible to chart, or was not released in that territory.

=== Mixtapes ===
Title	Mixtape details
Nothings Ever Good Enough	Released: April 12, 2019; Label: 10K Projects; Format: Digital download, streaming

=== Compilations ===
Title	Mixtape details
Headliners: iann dior	Released: October 15, 2021; Label: Universal Music Group, Inc. FP; Format: Digital download, streaming

=== Singles ===
==== As lead artist ====
List of singles as lead artist, with selected chart positions
Title	Year	Peak chart positions							Certifications	Album
Title	Year	US Bub.	US R&B /HH	US Rock	CAN	HUN	NZ Hot	SMR	Certifications	Album
"Gone Girl" (featuring Trippie Redd)	2019	—	—	—	—	—	13	—	RIAA: Platinum; ARIA: Gold; RMNZ: Gold	Industry Plant
"What Is Real"	2019	—	—	—	—	—	—	—		Industry Plant
"Pouring"	2019	—	—	—	—	—	—	—		Non-album single
"Strings" (featuring Gunna)	2019	—	—	—	—	—	—	—		Industry Plant
"Good Day"	2020	—	—	—	—	—	33	—	MC: Gold; RIAA: Gold	I'm Gone
"Sick and Tired" (featuring Machine Gun Kelly and Travis Barker)	2020	15	—	3	—	—	9	—	RIAA: Platinum; MC: Gold; RMNZ: Gold	I'm Gone
"Prospect" (featuring Lil Baby)	2020	8	50	—	—	—	27	—	RIAA: Platinum; MC: Platinum	I'm Gone
"Lose Somebody" (with Jack Gilinsky)	2020	—	—	—	—	—	—	—		Non-album singles
"Holding On"	2020	—	—	—	—	—	14	—	MC: Gold	Non-album singles
"First Time" (with Illenium)	2021	—	—	23	—	—	21	—		Fallen Embers
"Heat Waves" (Remix) (with Glass Animals)	2021	—	—	—	—	—	—	—		Non-album single
"V12" (featuring Lil Uzi Vert)	2021	20	—	—	—	—	22	—		On to Better Things
"Let You"	2021	—	—	—	—	—	18	6		On to Better Things
"Thought It Was" (with Travis Barker and Machine Gun Kelly)	2022	23	—	18	76	—	15	—		On to Better Things
"Be U (216 Hz)" (with Maejor)	2022	—	—	—	—	—	—	—		Non-album singles
"Live Fast Die Numb"	2022	—	—	40	—	—	—	—		Non-album singles
"I Find It Hard"	2022	—	—	—	—	—	—	—		Non-album singles
"Valley of Lies" (with Tomorrow X Together)	2022	—	—	—	—	35	36	—		Non-album singles
"Do It All"	2023	—	—	—	—	—	—	—		Non-album singles
"Low Tide"	2023	—	—	—	—	—	—	—		Non-album singles
"Edge of Tomorrow"	2024	—	—	—	—	—	—	—		Non-album singles
"I Think You Should Go"	2024	—	—	—	—	—	—	—		Blind
"—" denotes a recording that did not chart, was not eligible to chart, or was not released in that territory.

==== As featured artist ====
Title	Year	Peak chart positions										Certifications	Album
Title	Year	US	US Rock	AUS	CAN	IRE	NLD	NZ	SWE	UK	WW	Certifications	Album
"Come Again" (Bernard Jabs featuring Iann Dior)	2019	—	—	—	—	—	—	—	—	—	—		Non-album single
"I Can't Sleep" (Poorstacy featuring Iann Dior)	2020	—	—	—	—	—	—	—	—	—	—		The Breakfast Club
"Too Much" (Zoahh featuring Iann Dior)	2020	—	—	—	—	—	—	—	—	—	—		Graduation
"Mood" (24kGoldn featuring Iann Dior)	2020	1	1	1	1	1	1	1	1	1	2	RIAA: 7× Platinum; ARIA: 7× Platinum; BPI: 2× Platinum; GLF: 4× Platinum; MC: Diamond; RMNZ: 6× Platinum	El Dorado
"Ego" (Carlie Hanson featuring Iann Dior)	2020	—	—	—	—	—	—	—	—	—	—		DestroyDestroyDestroyDestroy
"Tonight" (Jxdn featuring Iann Dior)	2020	—	29	—	—	—	—	—	—	—	—		Tell Me About Tomorrow
"Higher" (Clean Bandit featuring Iann Dior)	2021	—	—	—	—	67	—	— (Note: "Higher" did not enter the NZ Top 40 Singles Chart, but peaked at number seven on the NZ Hot Singles Chart.)	—	66	—		Non-album singles
"Happy Endings" (Mike Shinoda featuring Iann Dior and Upsahl)	2021	—	50	—	—	—	—	—	—	—	—		Non-album singles
"Don't Freak Out" (LilHuddy featuring Iann Dior, Travis Barker, and Tyson Ritter)	2021	—	46	—	—	—	—	— (Note: "Don't Freak Out" did not enter the NZ Top 40 Singles Chart, but peaked at number 36 on the NZ Hot Singles Chart.)	—	—	—		Teenage Heartbreak
"Kick Off The Wall" (KickFlip featuring Iann Dior)	2026	-	-	-	-	-	-	-	-	-	-		KICK OFF THE WALL Pt. 1
"—" denotes a recording that did not chart, was not eligible to chart, or was not released in that territory.

=== Other charted and certified songs ===
Title	Year	Peak chart positions				Certifications	Album
Title	Year	US Bub.	US Rock	CAN	NZ Hot	Certifications	Album
"Molly" (featuring Bernard Jabs)	2019	—	—	—	—	RIAA: Gold	Nothings Ever Good Enough
"Emotions"	2019	—	—	—	—	RIAA: Platinum; BPI: Silver; RMNZ: Gold	Nothings Ever Good Enough
"Darkside" (featuring Travis Barker)	2019	—	—	—	36		Industry Plant
"Paradise"	2020	—	—	—	30		I'm Gone
"Pretty Girls"	2020	—	—	—	21	MC: Gold; RIAA: Gold	I'm Gone
"Lost Me" (Internet Money featuring Lil Mosey, Lil Skies, and Iann Dior)	2020	—	—	—	28		B4 the Storm
"Nothing Inside" (Machine Gun Kelly featuring Iann Dior)	2020	—	20	—	—		Tickets to My Downfall
"Honest" (Phem featuring Iann Dior)	2020	—	— (Note: "Honest" did not enter the Hot Rock & Alternative Songs chart, but peaked at number 35 on the Alternative Airplay chart.)	—	—		How U Stop Hating Urself Pt. 1
"Shots in the Dark" (with Trippie Redd)	2021	—	—	81	8		Still Here
"Don't Wanna Believe"	2021	—	—	—	34		Still Here
"Is It You"	2022	—	37	—	—		On to Better Things
"Obvious" (with Travis Barker)	2022	—	50	—	—		On to Better Things
"Fake Love Don't Last" (with Machine Gun Kelly)	2022	14	16	90	14		Mainstream Sellout
"—" denotes a recording that did not chart, was not eligible to chart, or was not released in that territory.

=== Guest appearances ===
List of non-single guest appearances, showing other artist(s), year released and album name
Title	Year	Other artist(s)	Album
"One Love One Life"	2019	1kLove	One Love One Life
"Run Away"	2020	Kierra Luv	Take It or Leave It
"Irregular"	2020	Zoahh	Graduation
"Trust You"	2020	Zoahh	Graduation
"Forget"	2020	Kyle, Trippie Redd, The Drums	See You When I Am Famous
"Lost Me"	2020	Internet Money, Lil Mosey, Lil Skies	B4 the Storm
"Nothing Inside"	2020	Machine Gun Kelly	Tickets to My Downfall
"Like Me"	2020	$NOT	Beautiful Havoc
"Baby"	2020	DJ Scheme	Family
"Honest"	2020	Phem	How U Stop Hating Urself Pt. 1
"Seaside"	2021	Lil Tecca	We Love You Tecca 2
"Circles"	2021	None	Blade Runner: Black Lotus (Original Television Soundtrack)
"Let U Go"	2022	FLW Lözzvã	Seule Vie

=== Collaborative ===
Title	Album details
Audio Up presents Original Music from Halloween In Hell	Released: October 2020; Label: Audio Up; With: Machine Gun Kelly, Iann Dior, Phem, Dana Dentata, Tommy Lee

== Filmography ==
Year	Title	Role	Notes
2021	Downfalls High	Himself	

=== Audio ===
Year	Title	Role	Notes
2020	Halloween in Hell	Himself	

== Tours ==
Headlining

- Better Things Tour (2022)

Supporting

- Mainstream Sellout Tour (2022)
