= Sick and Tired (Iann Dior song) =

2020 single by Iann Dior featuring Machine Gun Kelly and Travis Barker

Single by Iann Dior featuring Machine Gun Kelly and Travis Barker

from the EP I'm Gone
- Released: April 17, 2020
- Genre: Pop-punk
- Length: 2:24
- Label: 10K
- Songwriters: Michael Olmo; Colson Baker; Travis Barker; Omer Fedi
- Producers: Barker; Fedi

Iann Dior singles chronology
"Good Day" (2020)	"Sick and Tired" (2020)	"Prospect" (2020)

Machine Gun Kelly singles chronology
"Bullets with Names" (2020)	"Sick and Tired" (2020)	"Stay Away" (2020)

Travis Barker singles chronology
"Sick of Me" (2020)	"Sick and Tired" (2020)	"Sex with My Ex" (2020)

Music video
- "Sick and Tired" on YouTube

"Sick and Tired" is a song by American rapper Iann Dior, released on April 17, 2020 as the second single from his EP I'm Gone (2020). It features American musicians Machine Gun Kelly and Travis Barker, who produced the song along with Omer Fedi.

== Background ==
Regarding the collaboration, Iann Dior told Complex:

I'm so excited to be releasing this new song which I made with two of my favorite people in music. It was so fun working with them and Omer Fedi on this song. We shot the video in L.A. right before everything got shut down because of coronavirus, so I'm very happy that we made it just in time! I hope you guys enjoy it and I can't wait for you to her more. Stay safe!

Machine Gun Kelly stated the song was one of three that he made with Dior during a studio session.

== Composition ==
"Sick and Tired" is a pop-punk-infused track. It centers on Iann Dior and Machine Gun Kelly dealing with their respective issues, and being "stuck inside" a house.

== Music video ==
The music video was directed by Mooch and released alongside the single. Set in a haunted house, it sees Dior and Kelly searching through rooms before finding each other and then meeting up with Travis Barker to form a band.

== Charts ==
Chart performance for "Sick and Tired"
Chart (2020)	Peak position
New Zealand Hot Singles (RMNZ)	9
US Bubbling Under Hot 100 (Billboard)	15
US Hot Rock & Alternative Songs (Billboard)	3

== Certifications ==
Certifications for "Sick and Tired"
Region	Certification	Certified units/sales
Canada (Music Canada)	Platinum	80,000^{‡}
New Zealand (RMNZ)	Gold	15,000^{‡}
United States (RIAA)	Platinum	1,000,000^{‡}
^{‡} Sales+streaming figures based on certification alone.
