= Bill & Ted Face the Music (soundtrack) =

2020 soundtrack albums

Bill & Ted Face the Music: The Original Motion Picture Soundtrack

Soundtrack album by Various artists
- Released: August 28, 2020
- Genres: Heavy metal; space rock; hard rock; alternative rock
- Length: 43:44
- Labels: 10K Projects; Caroline

Bill & Ted Face the Music: The Original Motion Picture Soundtrack is the soundtrack to the 2020 film of the same name, released on August 28, 2020 by 10K Projects and Caroline Distribution, the same day as the film's theatrical release. The album features a selection of musical tracks handpicked by music supervisor Jonathan Leahy whose goal was to make the soundtrack a celebration of the electric guitar.

== Background ==
Rather than focus on the hair metal of the original films, music director Jonathan Leahy involved groups such as Weezer, Mastodon and Lamb of God, who he believed represented the current state of electric guitar. He helped them compose songs for the film, such as Lamb of God's "The Death of Us", used in the future prison scene. As Tosin Abasi was also serving as the "air shredder" for Bill & Ted, Leahy brought in his band, Animals as Leaders, to play on the soundtrack version of the world-saving song.

In addition to selecting the musical acts, Leahy also worked with Gibson to select the various styles of guitars that are used to represent various eras of music in the film. During a performance in August 2019, Kid Cudi announced that the soundtrack for the film features a remix of his 2010 song "Erase Me" done by Steve Aoki, but was not included in the album. Weezer released a music video for "Beginning of the End" released as a single on August 14, 2020. Mastodon released a single entitled "Rufus Lives" on August 28, 2020.

== Track listing ==
No.	Title	Artist	Length
1.	"Lost in Time"	Big Black Delta	4:08
2.	"Big Red Balloon"	Alec Wigdahl	3:04
3.	"Beginning of the End" (Wyld Stallyns Edit)	Weezer	3:27
4.	"Story of Our Lives"	Cold War Kids	3:31
5.	"Rufus Lives"	Mastodon	3:32
6.	"Circuits of Time"	Big Black Delta	2:43
7.	"Darkest Night"	Poorstacy	2:15
8.	"The Death of Us"	Lamb of God	3:59
9.	"Breaker"	Fidlar	3:00
10.	"Leave Me Alone"	Culture Wars	3:02
11.	"Right Where You Belong"	Blame My Youth	2:40
12.	"Face the Music"	Wyld Stallyns (feat. Animals As Leaders, Christian Scott aTunde Adjuah)	4:29
13.	"That Which Binds Us Through Time: The Chemical, Physical and Biological Nature of Love; an Exploration of The Meaning of Meaning, Part 1"	Wyld Stallyns	3:54
Total length:			43:44

== Reception ==
Evan Minsker of Pitchfork called the film's music as the "worst part of the film" as it "feels safe and homogeneous".

== Score album ==
Bill & Ted Face the Music: Original Motion Picture Score

Film score by Mark Isham
- Released: August 28, 2020
- Genre: Film score
- Length: 34:04
- Label: Lakeshore
- Producer: Mark Isham

Mark Isham chronology
Togo (2019)	Bill & Ted Face the Music (2020)	Honest Thief (2020)

Bill & Ted Face the Music: Original Motion Picture Score is the album featuring excerpts from the film score composed by Mark Isham. It was released on August 28, 2020 by Lakeshore Records, the same day as the film.

Isham started working on the film's music during the COVID-19 pandemic where he had to score for the film remotely. The score was recorded in June 2020, laying 40 string players, nine brass players, and woodwinds from the Budapest Scoring Orchestra recording per day. He said "I think in another year, given the right software and the right internet connections, you’ll be able to record effectively with anyone in the world".

=== Track listing ===
No.	Title	Length
1.	"Welcome To The Future (Whoa)"	1:54
2.	"Reality As We Know It"	3:17
3.	"A Destiny To Fulfill"	1:05
4.	"Taking It From Ourselves"	1:30
5.	"The Great Turntable"	1:53
6.	"Unite The World In Music"	1:29
7.	"We're Gonna Fix This"	1:26
8.	"We Got The Song"	3:46
9.	"Freeze! Preston-Logan"	2:08
10.	"We're Dead! And In Hell!"	2:12
11.	"Textbook Entanglement"	2:15
12.	"Dennis Caleb McCoy"	1:21
13.	"Put It All Together"	1:16
14.	"The Unravelling Has Begun"	1:53
15.	"You Must Earn The Right To Rock"	1:07
16.	"MP46"	4:41
17.	"One Last Shred"	0:51
Total length:		34:04
