= Snot (rapper) =

American rapper, singer, and songwriter (born 1997)

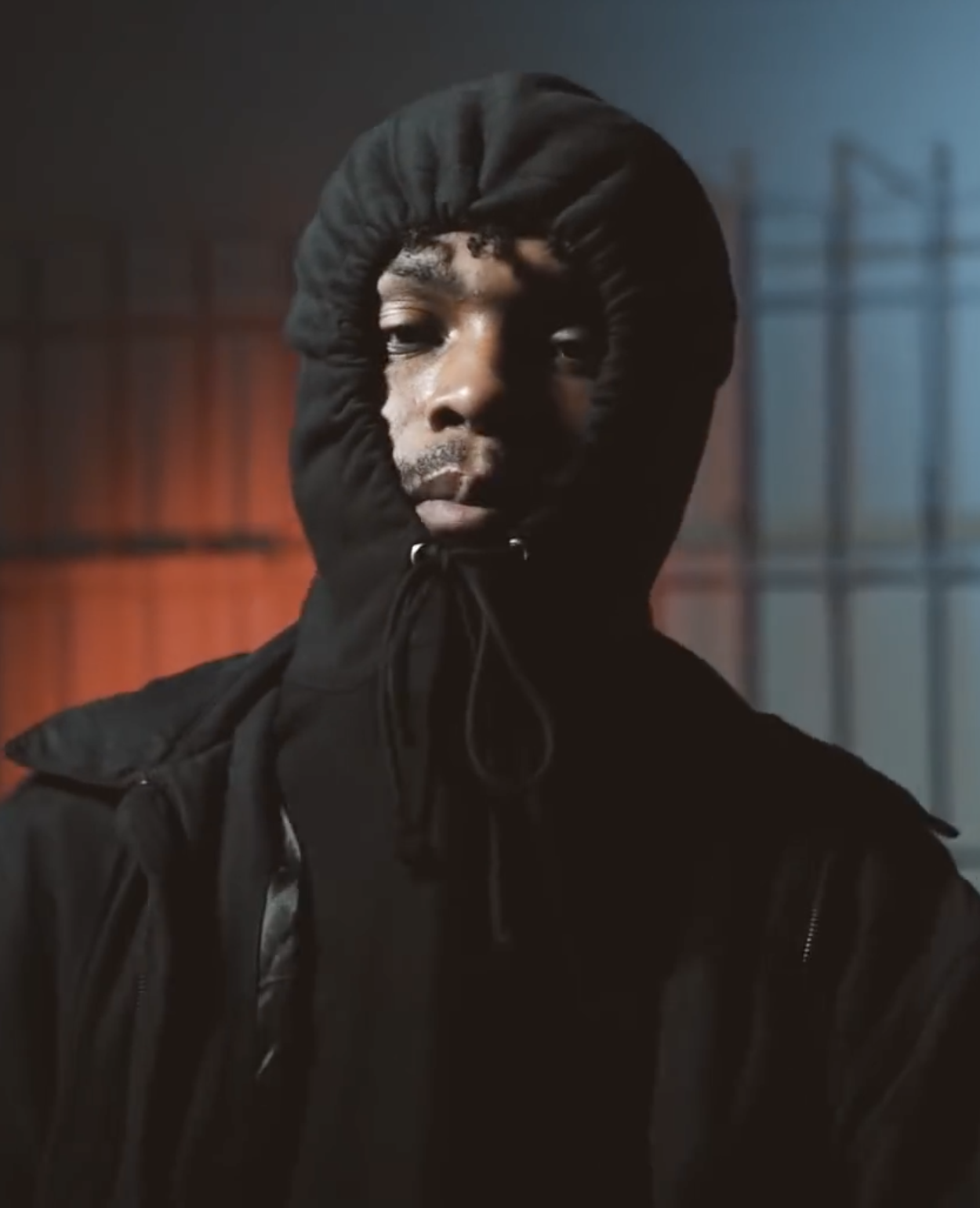
- Snot in 2020

Background information
- Born: Edy Junior Edouard; December 16, 1997 (age 28); Brooklyn, New York, U.S.
- Origin: Lake Worth Beach, Florida, U.S.
- Genres: Southern hip-hop; trap; lo-fi; chill-out; emo rap; cloud rap; chillwave
- Occupations: Rapper; singer; songwriter
- Years active: 2015–present
- Label: 300 Entertainment
- Website: snot.xyz

Edy Junior Edouard (born December 16, 1997), known professionally as SNOT (stylized as $NOT), is an American singer-songwriter and rapper. Born in New York City, he moved to Lake Worth Beach, Florida at seven years old, where he would begin his rap career through SoundCloud in 2016. Edouard rose to prominence with his 2018 song "Gosha", which received platinum certification by the Recording Industry Association of America (RIAA). The following year, he signed with 300 Entertainment to release his second studio album, Beautiful Havoc (2020).

== Early life ==
Edy Junior Edouard was born on December 16, 1997, in Brooklyn, New York City. He is of Haitian and Dominican descent. His family would move to Lake Worth Beach in Florida when he was seven. When he was in high school, $NOT and his friend would begin experimenting with music, and recording themselves using a USB microphone. In an interview with Jack Angell of Complex, $NOT stated that he "was listening to dudes like Xavier Wulf, Bones, Yung Lean, Lil Wayne, and Tyler, the Creator... along with Memphis artists like Shawty Pimp and the influential Memphis-based group Three 6 Mafia". Snot expanded more on the topic by stating to interviewers, "That's how I got into this stuff, and things started happening. My friend Wetback Manny was already putting shit on SoundCloud and he introduced me to recording and how to use a microphone."

== Career ==
=== 2018–2019: The Tissue Files and "Gosha" ===
In April 2018, Snot had self-released his first extended play (EP) The Tissue Files, featuring verses from Cameronazi and Subjectz, as well as production from Frakcija, Kaji, Windxws, and YZ. This EP was Snot's final release before releasing his YZ-produced breakout hit "Gosha" on September 7, 2018.

Snot's single "Billy Boy" was featured in the pilot episode of HBO's American teen drama Euphoria.

=== 2020–present: - Tragedy +, Beautiful Havoc, and Ethereal ===
Following the success of his singles "Gosha" and "Megan", Snot signed to 300 Entertainment. On March 6, 2020, Snot released - Tragedy +, his debut studio album, which features Maggie Lindemann and Wifisfuneral and includes the aforementioned singles.

On September 24, 2020, Snot released "Revenge", the first single from his second album, alongside a music video directed by Cole Bennett under his multimedia company Lyrical Lemonade. Snot teamed up with Flo Milli for the project's second single, "Mean", on October 15, 2020, accompanied by another Cole Bennett music video. On October 30, 2020, Snot released his second studio album titled Beautiful Havoc, with 300 Entertainment. The project features Iann Dior, Denzel Curry, and Flo Milli, and charted at number 172 on the Billboard 200. Snot released five additional music videos following the album: "Who Do I Trust" on November 5, 2020, "Watch Out" on December 13, 2020, "Like Me" on January 15, 2021, "Sangria" (featuring Denzel Curry) on February 17, 2021, and "Life" on March 30, 2021.

On April 9, 2021, Snot released the single "Whipski", which features a guest appearance from fellow rapper and singer Lil Skies. It is expected to be the lead single to his third album. "Whipski" became Snot's first song to reach a major chart, peaking at number 25 on the Bubbling Under Hot 100. On May 28, 2021, Snot collaborated with fellow rapper Cochise on the song "Tell Em". This would become his and Cochise's debut on the Billboard Hot 100, peaking at number 64.

On November 24, 2021, Snot released the single "Go". He followed up with his single "Doja" with ASAP Rocky, released on February 4, 2022. Both singles appear on his third album Ethereal, which Snot released on February 11, 2022. The album features ASAP Rocky, Teddi Jones, Trippie Redd, Kevin Abstract, Juicy J, and Joey Badass. Snot had finished 2022 with his single "SIMPLE" and was released simultaneously with a music video on October 14, 2022.

== Discography ==
=== Studio albums ===
List of studio albums, with selected details
Title	Studio album details	Peak chart positions	
Title	Studio album details	US	CAN
Tragedy +	Released: March 6, 2020; Label: 300; Format: Digital download, streaming	—	—
Beautiful Havoc	Released: October 30, 2020; Label: 300; Format: Digital download, streaming, vinyl	172	—
Ethereal	Released: February 11, 2022; Label: 300; Format: Digital download, streaming, LP	66	61
Viceroy	Released: July 12, 2024; Label: 300; Format: Digital download, streaming	—	—

=== Mixtapes ===
List of mixtapes, with selected details
Title	Mixtape details
High + Risk	Released:August 21, 2026; Label: Self-released; Format: Digital download, streaming

=== Extended plays ===
List of EPs, with selected details
Title	EP details
The Tissue Files	Released: April 27, 2018 (Note: This EP was released exclusively on SoundCloud.); Label: Self-released; Format: Digital download, streaming

=== Singles ===
List of singles as featured artist, showing year released and album name
Title	Year	Peak chart positions					Certifications	Album
Title	Year	US	US R&B /HH	CAN	NZ Hot	UK	Certifications	Album
"Stamina"	2018	—	—	—	—	—		Non-album singles
"Lovely" (featuring $US Valentino)	2018	—	—	—	—	—		Non-album singles
"Gucci"	2018	—	—	—	—	—		Non-album singles
"Seven Corps" (featuring $US Valentino)	2018	—	—	—	—	—		Non-album singles
"Pull Up"	2018	—	—	—	—	—		Non-album singles
"Champion"	2018	—	—	—	—	—		Non-album singles
"Kill Me Bitch" (featuring Lil Toe)	2018	—	—	—	—	—		Non-album singles
"Vintage Dior"	2018	—	—	—	—	—		Non-album singles
"Gosha"	2018	—	—	—	—	—	RIAA: Platinum	Tragedy +
"Drip"	2018	—	—	—	—	—		Non-album singles
"Northface"	2018	—	—	—	—	—		Non-album singles
"Motorola"	2018	—	—	—	—	—		Non-album singles
"Billy Boy"	2019	—	—	—	—	—		Non-album singles
"Xanax Flies"	2019	—	—	—	—	—		Non-album singles
"Megan"	2019	—	—	—	—	—		Tragedy +
"Vision" (featuring Lil Tracy)	2019	—	—	—	—	—		Non-album single
"Beretta" (featuring Wifisfuneral)	2019	—	—	—	—	—	RIAA: Gold	Tragedy +
"Moon & Stars" (featuring Maggie Lindemann)	2020	—	—	—	—	—	RIAA: Gold	Tragedy +
"Human" (featuring Night Lovell)	2020	—	—	—	—	—		Non-album singles
"Can You Help Me"	2020	—	—	—	—	—		Non-album singles
"Revenge"	2020	—	—	—	—	—		Beautiful Havoc
"Mean" (with Flo Milli)	2020	—	—	—	—	—	RIAA: Gold	Beautiful Havoc
"Sangria" (featuring Denzel Curry)	2020	—	—	—	—	—		Beautiful Havoc
"Whipski" (featuring Lil Skies and Internet Money)	2021	— (Note: "Whipski" did not enter the Billboard Hot 100, but peaked at number 25 on the Bubbling Under Hot 100 chart.)	—	—	13	—		Non-album singles
"Tell Em" (with Cochise)	2021	64	22	51	1	99	RIAA: 2× Platinum	Non-album singles
"Red"	2021	—	—	—	29	—		Non-album singles
"Go"	2021	—	—	—	—	—		Ethereal
"Doja" (with ASAP Rocky)	2022	87	30	67	4	—		Ethereal
"Vivid" (with Rich Brian)	2022	—	—	—	—	—		Non-album singles
"Easter Pink"	2023	—	—	—	—	—		Non-album singles
"Cruel World"	2023	—	—	—	—	—		Viceroy
"0%" (featuring ZillaKami)	2024	—	—	—	—	—		Non-album single
"Bully"	2024	—	—	—	—	—		Viceroy
"Hilarious" (with Cochise)	2024	—	—	—	—	—		Viceroy
"So What"	2024	—	—	—	—	—		Non-album singles
"Where My Hug At"	2024	—	—	—	—	—		Non-album singles
"Pain4Real"	2024	—	—	—	—	—		Non-album singles
"The Great Oath"	2025	—	—	—	—	—		TBA
"La Tradito"	2025	—	—	—	—	—		TBA
"A New Day Is a New Play"	2025	—	—	—	—	—		TBA
"Dresscode"	2025	—	—	—	—	—		TBA
"Imma Ride 4 You"	2025	—	—	—	—	—		TBA
"I Have Patience"	2025	—	—	—	—	—		TBA
"—" denotes a recording that did not chart or was not released in that territory.
