= Derez De'Shon =

American rapper and singer

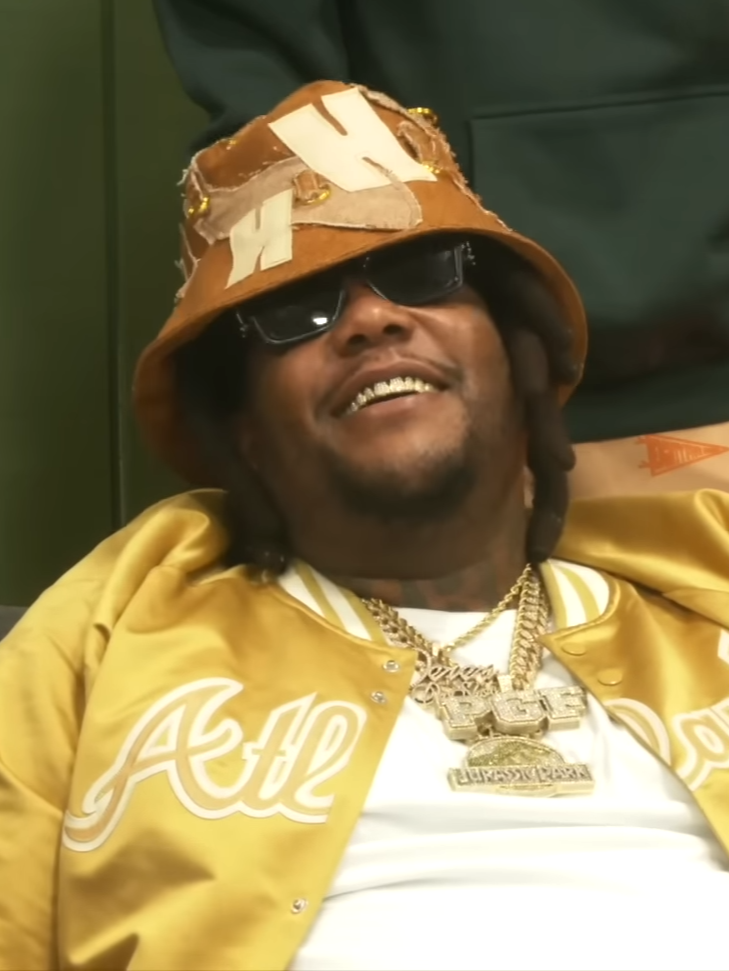
- Lenard in 2024

Background information
- Also known as: D Dash; D-Bo
- Born: Derez De'Shon Lenard; March 25, 1989 (age 37); Atlanta, Georgia, U.S.
- Occupations: Rapper; singer; songwriter
- Years active: 2011–present
- Labels: The Connect; Venice; Commission Music; BMG; Brick Squad Monopoly
- Formerly of: Rich Gang

Derez De'Shon Lenard (born March 25, 1989), formerly known as D-Dash, is an American rapper and singer from Atlanta, Georgia. He is best known for his 2017 single "Hardaway", which peaked at number 61 on the Billboard Hot 100. His debut studio album, Pain 2 (2018), narrowly entered the Billboard 200.

== Early life ==
Lenard was born on March 25, 1989, in Atlanta, Georgia.

== Career ==
Lenard began his career as part of the short-lived hip-hop group Dirt Gang, who were signed by fellow Atlanta rapper Waka Flocka Flame to his record label, Brick Squad Monopoly in 2011.

Although Lenard gained some recognition with the singles "Emotionz" and "Came a Long Way", he did not break into the mainstream until his single "Hardaway" was released. It became his first Billboard charting single, peaking at number 61 on the Billboard Hot 100. His debut studio album, Pain 2 (2018), narrowly entered the Billboard 200. Prior to its release, he joined Birdman's hip-hop collective Rich Gang, although he released no projects under its parent entity, Cash Money Records.

In 2022, Lenard was credited as a songwriter on Summer Walker's project Still Over It, as he frequently collaborates with the album's producer and fellow Atlanta native, London on da Track. That year, he released his second studio album, Bigger Than Me.

On August 7, 2026, he released his third studio album, I'm Not Ok But....

== Discography ==
=== Studio albums ===
Title	Album details	Peak chart positions	
Title	Album details	US	US Heat.
Pain 2	Released: December 14, 2018; Label: Commission Music, BMG; Format: Digital download, streaming	186	17
Bigger Than Me	Released: November 4, 2022; Label: The Connect, Venice; Format: Digital download, streaming	—	—
I'm Not Ok But...	Released: August 7, 2026; Label: The Connect; Format: Digital download, streaming	—	—

=== Mixtapes ===
Title	Mixtape details	Peak chart positions
Title	Mixtape details	US Heat.
The Warm Up	Released: January 11, 2013; Label: Self-released; Format: Digital download, streaming	—
Mill B4 Dinner Time	Released: May 20, 2013; Label: Self-released; Format: Digital download, streaming	—
The Warm Up 2	Released: March 26, 2014; Label: Self-released; Format: Digital download, streaming	—
The Greatest	Released: February 10, 2015; Label: Self-released; Format: Digital download, streaming	—
AmeriKKKa	Released: February 24, 2015; Label: Self-released; Format: Digital download, streaming	—
Pain	Released: August 21, 2017; Label: Commission Music, BMG; Format: Digital download, streaming	—
Thank Da Streets	Released: November 23, 2017; Label: Commission Music, BMG; Format: Digital download, streaming	—
Pain 3	Released: August 21, 2020; Label: Commission Music, BMG; Format: Digital download, streaming	10

=== Singles ===
Title	Year	Peak chart positions				Certifications	Album
Title	Year	US	US R&B/ HH	US Rhythmic	US R&B/HH Air.	Certifications	Album
"Emotionz" (featuring Kevin Gates)	2016	—	—	—	—		Non-album singles
"Came A Long Way" (featuring Trae tha Truth and M.U.G.)	2016	—	—	—	—		Non-album singles
"World Is Ours" (featuring K Camp and Ace Hood)	2016	—	—	—	—		Non-album singles
"Pain"	2017	—	—	—	—		Pain
"Hardaway" (solo or featuring 2 Chainz and Yo Gotti)	2017	61	26	27	11	RIAA: Gold	Pain
"Fed Up"	2018	—	—	—	31		Pain
"Beat The Odds" (featuring YFN Lucci)	2018	—	—	—	—		Pain 2
"Whaddup Doe" (featuring Mozzy)	2018	—	—	37	—		Pain 2
"How Many Shots"	2020	—	—	—	—		Non-album singles
"Party Pack"	2020	—	—	—	—		Non-album singles
"Calm Down"	2020	—	—	—	—		Pain 3
"In My Feelings"	2021	—	—	—	—		Bigger Than Me
"Residue" (featuring Money Mu)	2021	—	—	—	—		Bigger Than Me
"All Them Days" (featuring Morray)	2021	—	—	—	—		Bigger Than Me
"Abandoned"	2021	—	—	—	—		Bigger Than Me
"Dirty Mirror"	2022	—	—	—	—		Bigger Than Me
"Save Me" (featuring 1Shot Dealz)	2022	—	—	—	—		Bigger Than Me
"S.T.L.B." (featuring Big Boogie)	2022	—	—	—	—		Bigger Than Me
"Can't Lie" (with Kirky)	2022	—	—	—	—		Non-album singles
"Car Crash Part 2" (with Fooley)	2024	—	—	—	—		Non-album singles
"3 da Hardway" (with Goldmouf Famgoon and Ralo)	2025	—	—	—	—		Non-album singles
"Forever Amb Lo" (with Spiffie Luciano and Cobby Supreme)	2025	—	—	—	—		Non-album singles
"Wherever It's Love" (with Paxqiuao)	2025	—	—	—	—		Non-album singles
"The Holy Trinity" (with Big Boogie and Boosie Badazz)	2025	—	—	—	—		Non-album singles
"Southside God"	2026	—	—	—	—		I'm Not Ok But...
"FrFr" (featuring Morray and T-Rell)	2026	—	—	—	—		I'm Not Ok But...
"All in My Head"	2026	—	—	—	—		I'm Not Ok But...
"What You On"	2026	—	—	—	—		I'm Not Ok But...
