= Higher (Clean Bandit song) =

Single by Clean Bandit featuring Iann Dior
- Released: 29 January 2021
- Length: 3:23
- Label: Atlantic; Warner
- Songwriters: Dan Smith; Jack Patterson; Iann Dior
- Producers: Grace Chatto; Patterson; Mark Ralph

Clean Bandit singles chronology
"Tick Tock" (2020)	"Higher" (2021)	"Drive" (2021)

Iann Dior singles chronology
"Holding On" (2020)	"Higher" (2021)	"Happy Endings" (2021)

Music video
- "Higher" on YouTube

"Higher" is a song by British electronic music group Clean Bandit, featuring vocals from Puerto Rican-American rapper, singer, and songwriter Iann Dior. It was released as a single on 29 January 2021 by Atlantic and Warner Music. The song was written by Dan Smith, Jack Patterson and Mark Ralph.

== Music video ==
A music video to accompany the release of "Higher" was first released onto YouTube on 29 January 2021. A man sings while he dances in a tropical island. The video was filmed at Lime Cay, off the coast of Jamaica.

== Personnel ==
Credits adapted from Tidal.

- Grace Chatto – producer, steel drums
- Jack Patterson – producer, composer, keyboards, programmer
- Mark Ralph – producer, additional keyboards, mixer, percussion, programmer
- Dan Smith – composer, additional vocals
- Michael Olomo – composer
- Mike Hough – additional vocals
- Yasmin Green – additional vocals
- Gemma Chester – assistant engineer
- Luke Patterson – drums
- Josh Green – engineer
- Iann Dior – featured artist
- Stuart Hawkes – masterer
- Ryan Cantu – recording engineer

== Charts ==
=== Weekly charts ===
Weekly chart performance for "Higher"
Chart (2021)	Peak position
CIS (Tophit)	242
Czech Republic Airplay (ČNS IFPI)	28
Ireland (IRMA)	67
New Zealand Hot Singles (RMNZ)	7
Poland Airplay (ZPAV)	39
San Marino (SMRRTV Top 50)	45
UK Singles (Official Charts)	66
UK Dance (Official Charts)	19
US Hot Dance/Electronic Songs (Billboard)	9

=== Year-end charts ===
Year-end chart performance for "Higher"
Chart (2021)	Position
US Hot Dance/Electronic Songs (Billboard)	27

== Release history ==
Release history for "Higher"
Region	Date	Format	Label	Ref.
United Kingdom	29 January 2021	Digital download; streaming	Atlantic; Warner Music	
Italy	5 February 2021	Contemporary hit radio	Warner	
