= His & Hers (song) =

2021 single by Internet Money, Don Toliver and Lil Uzi Vert featuring Gunna

Single by Internet Money featuring Don Toliver, Lil Uzi Vert and Gunna
- Released: May 13, 2021
- Length: 3:44
- Label: Internet Money; TenThousand
- Songwriters: Danny Snodgrass, Jr.; Nick Mira; Alec Wigdahl; Henry Nichols; Cody Rounds; Caleb Toliver; Symere Woods; Sergio Kitchens; Cole Bennett; Michael Dean; Tyshane Thompson; Donny Flores; Giorgio Ligeon; Edgard Herrera; Juan Botero; Maxwell Nichols; Simon Plummer
- Producers: Taz Taylor; Nick Mira; Alec Wigdahl; Cxdy; Pharoah Vice

Internet Money singles chronology
"Whipski" (2021)	"His & Hers" (2021)	"Fast Lane" (2021)

Don Toliver singles chronology
"What You Need" (2021)	"His & Hers" (2021)	"Fast Lane" (2021)

Lil Uzi Vert singles chronology
"Badass" (2021)	"His & Hers" (2021)	"Sossboy 2" (2021)

Gunna singles chronology
"Keep My Distance" (2021)	"His & Hers" (2021)	"Work Out" (2021)

Music video
- "His & Hers" on YouTube

"His & Hers" is a single by American record collective Internet Money, featuring American rappers Don Toliver, Lil Uzi Vert, and Gunna. It was released on May 13, 2021, and was produced by Internet Money members Taz Taylor, Nick Mira, Alec Wigdahl, Zia Mian, Pharaoh Vice, and Cxdy.

== Background ==
In an interview, Taz Taylor told Zane Lowe that he started working on the song after the release of another song he produced, "Lemonade" by Internet Money, featuring Gunna, Toliver, and Canadian rapper Nav. Taylor was inspired to make another hit song, adding:

So at that point, I was like, "All right, well they want me to go make the biggest records. They want me to go get the biggest artists on the songs. That's what they want." So I was just searching for the biggest songs that I heard. And then "His & Hers", I heard a demo with a different guitar and it was way slow. It was like 127 BPM. And I was just like, "This is it. I got to do it." So August 15th was the first day of this song. I started working on it and I just finished it.

== Composition ==
The song, described as melodic, sees the rappers melodically rapping about their wealth, drugs and guns and "harmonizing about their rockstar lifestyles", over an instrumental of acoustic guitars and "booming" percussion. The chorus finds Don Toliver "crooning" about "rocking matching designer items with his girlfriend."

== Critical reception ==
Joshua Robinson of HotNewHipHop wrote that "Don's earworm of a hook is easily the most recognizable early highlight". Tara C. Mahadevan of Complex called Toliver's chorus "soulful". Elliot Santiago of Hypebeast wrote that Gunna and Lil Uzi Vert "elevate the track with a verse a piece", and the instruments in the beat "anchor the new tune, making for a breezy and soulful beat to add to your playlist." Chris DeVille of Stereogum compared "His & Hers" to the aforementioned song "Lemonade", writing that it is similar to the latter in which it "boasts chilled-out yet sweltering minor-key production that seems precision engineered for playlist placement". He added that Lil Uzi Vert's replacement for Nav "should theoretically be an upgrade."

== Music video ==
A music video for the song was directed by Cole Bennett and released on May 14, 2021. It shows Don Toliver, Lil Uzi Vert and Gunna inside a Windows XP computer screen, where they make their way through a misty forest, dressed in camouflage. Toliver performs his verse on a "grassy hilltop under a partially cloudy blue sky" and "frolics among a field of sunflowers" during the chorus. Gunna's performance setting is in a cubical room with a pattern also with hills in the sky on the walls and ceiling. Uzi appears on the surface of the Moon.

== Credits and personnel ==
Credits adapted from Tidal.

- Internet Money
  - Taz Taylor – production, songwriting
  - Nick Mira – production, songwriting
  - Alec Wigdahl – production, songwriting
  - Pharaoh Vice – production, songwriting
  - Cxdy – production, songwriting
- Don Toliver – lead vocals, songwriting
- Lil Uzi Vert – lead vocals, songwriting
- Gunna – featured vocals, songwriting
- Cole Bennett – songwriting
- Mike Dean – songwriting
- Beam – songwriting
- Donny Flores – songwriting
- Giorgio Ligeon – songwriting
- Edgard Herrera – songwriting, mixing, engineering, studio personnel
- Juan Botero – songwriting
- Maxwell Nichols – songwriting
- Simon Plummer – songwriting
- Chris Galland – mixing, studio personnel
- Manny Marroquin – mixing, studio personnel
- Francisco Salcido – mixing, studio personnel
- Anthony Vilchis – assistant mixing, studio personnel
- Jeremie Inhaber – assistant mixing, studio personnel
- Zach Pereyra – assistant mixing, studio personnel
- Emerson Mancini – mastering, studio personnel

== Charts ==
Chart performance for "His & Hers"
Chart (2021)	Peak position
Canada Hot 100 (Billboard)	53
Global 200 (Billboard)	74
New Zealand Hot Singles (RMNZ)	9
US Billboard Hot 100	67
US Hot R&B/Hip-Hop Songs (Billboard)	34
US Rhythmic Airplay (Billboard)	24
US Rolling Stone Top 100	44

== Certifications ==
Region	Certification	Certified units/sales
Brazil (Pro-Música Brasil)	Gold	20,000^{‡}
New Zealand (RMNZ)	Gold	15,000^{‡}
United States (RIAA)	Gold	500,000^{‡}
^{‡} Sales+streaming figures based on certification alone.
