= Somebody (Internet Money song) =

2019 single by Internet Money, Lil Tecca and A Boogie wit da Hoodie

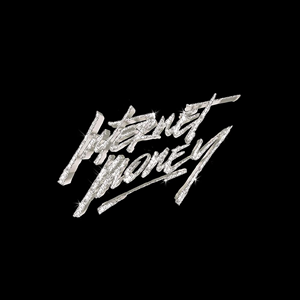

Single by Internet Money, Lil Tecca and A Boogie wit da Hoodie

from the album B4 the Storm
- Released: October 10, 2019
- Length: 2:54
- Label: Internet Money; TenThousand
- Songwriters: Danny Snodgrass, Jr.; Tyler-Justin Sharpe; Nick Mira; Artist Dubose
- Producers: Taz Taylor; Nick Mira

Internet Money singles chronology
"Somebody" (2019)	"Out of Love" (2020)

Lil Tecca singles chronology
"Did It Again (Remix)" (2019)	"Somebody" (2019)	"Why U Look Mad" (2019)

A Boogie wit da Hoodie singles chronology
"Party" (2019)	"Somebody" (2019)	"Reply" (2019)

Music video
- "Somebody" on YouTube

"Somebody" is the debut single by American record collective Internet Money and American rappers Lil Tecca and A Boogie wit da Hoodie. It was released on October 10, 2019 as the lead single from Internet Money's debut studio album B4 the Storm (2020).

== Charts ==
Chart (2019)	Peak position
Canada Hot 100 (Billboard)	54
Ireland (IRMA)	93
New Zealand Hot Singles (RMNZ)	16
UK Singles (OCC)	75
US Billboard Hot 100	96
US Hot R&B/Hip-Hop Songs (Billboard)	44

== Certifications ==
Region	Certification	Certified units/sales
Canada (Music Canada)	Platinum	80,000^{‡}
United States (RIAA)	Platinum	1,000,000^{‡}
^{‡} Sales+streaming figures based on certification alone.
