= Prospect (song) =

2020 single by Iann Dior featuring Lil Baby

Single by Iann Dior featuring Lil Baby

from the EP I'm Gone
- Released: May 22, 2020
- Length: 3:46
- Label: 10K
- Songwriters: Michael Olmo; Dominique Jones; Wesley Glass; Keegan Bach
- Producers: Wheezy; KBeaZy

Iann Dior singles chronology
"Sick and Tired" (2020)	"Prospect" (2020)	"Mood" (2020)

Lil Baby singles chronology
"Dealer (Remix)" (2020)	"Prospect" (2020)	"Both Sides" (2020)

Music video
- "Prospect" on YouTube

"Prospect" is a song by American rapper Iann Dior, released on May 22, 2020 as the third single from his EP I'm Gone (2020). Featuring American rapper Lil Baby, it was produced by Wheezy and KBeaZy.

== Composition ==
The production of the song contains a chimed beat.

== Critical reception ==
Lynn S. of HotNewHipHop wrote, "both iann and Baby deliver solid verses, keeping up with one another without stealing the spotlight." Noting the shift from Dior's previous pop-punk single "Sick and Tired" to his normal style, she further stated, "This dramatic switch proves that, as per usual, iann seems to be able to pull off almost any sound, and practically any artist can hop on a track and mesh well with him."

== Music video ==
The music video was directed by Omar Jones and released on August 11, 2020. Featuring East Asian elements, it shows Iann Dior surrounded by Asian architecture, kung fu, and Chinese mountains.

== Charts ==
Chart performance for "Prospect"
Chart (2020)	Peak position
New Zealand Hot Singles (RMNZ)	27
US Bubbling Under Hot 100 (Billboard)	8
US Hot R&B/Hip-Hop Songs (Billboard)	50

== Certifications ==
Certifications for "Prospect"
Region	Certification	Certified units/sales
Canada (Music Canada)	Platinum	80,000^{‡}
United States (RIAA)	Platinum	1,000,000^{‡}
^{‡} Sales+streaming figures based on certification alone.
