= Tell Em (Cochise and Snot song) =

Single by Cochise and Snot
- Released: May 28, 2021
- Genre: Hip hop
- Length: 3:00
- Label: Columbia
- Songwriters: Terrell Cox; Edy Edouard; Christian Pitts
- Producer: Jootsu

Cochise singles chronology
"Sanji" (2021)	"Tell Em" (2021)	"Sandman" (2021)

Snot singles chronology
"Whipski" (2021)	"Tell Em" (2021)	"Red" (2021)

Music video
- "Tell Em" on YouTube

"Tell Em" is a song by American rappers Cochise and $NOT, released on May 28, 2021, with an accompanying music video directed by Cole Bennett. Written by the artists alongside producer Jootsu, the song is about the rappers' success and money-making. After snippets of the song appeared on TikTok, it became popular and highly anticipated. After plenty of choreography/dance based videos on the social media platform TikTok, The song's popularity continued growing.

== Origin ==
The beat and melody for Cochise and $NOT's song "Tell Em" was created by Music Producer 'Christian Pitts' otherwise known as 'Jootsu'. Cochise and $NOT rapped on the beat about their success and lifestyle and explained their lyrics on Verified video by Genius.

Cochise and $NOT released an official music video for the song, which was directed by Cole Bennett, who is the founder of Lyrical Lemonade. The Music Video features Cochise and $NOT riding a tractor vehicle which was given by 'Smooth Offroad Performance' and was co-ordinated by Sebastian Rodriguez.

== Charts ==
Chart (2021)	Peak position
Canada (Canadian Hot 100)	51
New Zealand Hot Singles (RMNZ)	1
UK Singles (OCC)	99
US Billboard Hot 100	64
US Hot R&B/Hip-Hop Songs	22

== Certifications ==
Region	Certification	Certified units/sales
Poland (ZPAV)	Gold	25,000^{‡}
United Kingdom (BPI)	Silver	200,000^{‡}
United States (RIAA)	2× Platinum	2,000,000^{‡}
^{‡} Sales+streaming figures based on certification alone.
