= Doja (Snot and ASAP Rocky song) =

2022 single by Snot and ASAP Rocky

Single by Snot and ASAP Rocky

from the album Ethereal
- Released: February 4, 2022
- Length: 2:51
- Label: 300
- Songwriters: Edy Edouard; Rakim Mayers; Deshon Gillian; Yoshihisa Shimizu
- Producer: Dee B

Snot singles chronology
"Go" (2021)	"Doja" (2022)

ASAP Rocky singles chronology
"Arya" (2022)	"Doja" (2022)	"The God Hour" (2022)

Music video
- "Doja" on YouTube

"Doja" is a song by American rappers Snot and ASAP Rocky. It was released on February 4, 2022 as the second single from Snot's third studio album Ethereal (2022) and was produced by Dee B. The song caused some controversy over misheard lyrics regarding singer and rapper Doja Cat.

== Music video ==
The official music video was shot in December 2021, and released alongside the single. Directed by Hidji, it finds Snot and ASAP Rocky with their friends in various places in New York City, including a nail salon, tattoo shop and park, and stampeding through an underground subway tunnel. The video ends with a tribute to fashion designer Virgil Abloh, as Rocky looks at a mural of him painted on a brick apartment building.

== Controversy ==
In the chorus of the song, Snot raps, "I'll fuck that bitch named Doja Cat". Many mistook the line as "I fucked that bitch named Doja Cat", including Doja Cat herself, who responded in a Tweet, "you fucked who?", which she then deleted. Snot cleared up the misunderstanding on Twitter, revealing the actual lyrics and adding, "Im talkin my recklessness with no cognizance. It’s no disrespect to Doja. she a queen fr. I made this song to get lit in a moshpit typeshit".

== Charts ==
Chart performance for "Doja"
Chart (2022)	Peak position
Canada Hot 100 (Billboard)	67
Global 200 (Billboard)	125
New Zealand Hot Singles (RMNZ)	4
US Billboard Hot 100	87
US Hot R&B/Hip-Hop Songs (Billboard)	30
