= Cochise (rapper) =

American rapper (born 1998)

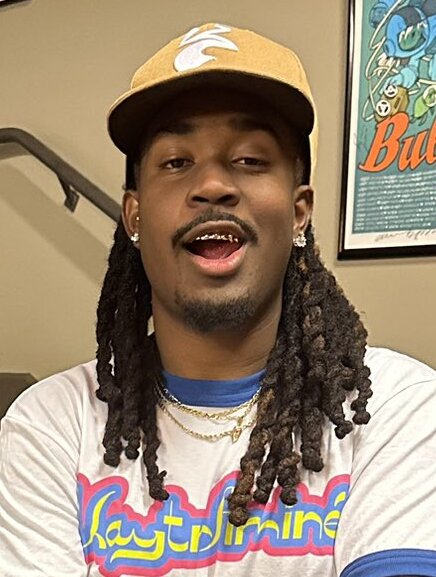
- Cochise at Motorco Music Hall in 2023

Background information
- Also known as: Yung Cochise
- Born: Terrell Anthony Cox; May 29, 1998 (age 28); Palm Beach, Florida, U.S.
- Origin: Palm Bay, Florida, U.S.
- Genres: Trap; cloud rap; dancehall
- Occupations: Rapper; singer; songwriter; record producer; streamer
- Years active: 2015–present
- Labels: Columbia (former); ONErpm

Terrell Anthony Cox (born May 29, 1998), known professionally as Cochise (Note: Pronounced /koʊˈtʃiːz/.) (Note: The namesake of Cox's stage name is a character from the 1979 film The Warriors played by David Harris.) (formerly known as Yung Cochise (Note: Pronounced /jʌŋ/ /koʊˈtʃiːz/.)), is an American rapper. He initially garnered attention after his single "Hatchback" rose to popularity on TikTok in 2020. His 2021 single, "Tell Em" (with $not), peaked at number 64 on the Billboard Hot 100. Cochise has since released three studio albums, with his debut being Benbow Crescent in 2021.

== Early life ==
Cox was born in Palm Beach, Florida, and grew up in Palm Bay. Being of Jamaican descent, he began to listen to reggae and dancehall music when he was young. As a kid, he was influenced by Chubb Rock. He attended Heritage High School and had aspirations of becoming a pro footballer. He graduated in 2016 and ultimately decided to pursue his passion in rap, citing the lack of control in a footballing career as being undesirable.

== Career ==
=== 2015–2017: Beginnings ===
Starting in late 2015, Cox posted his first few songs on SoundCloud under the name Yung Cochise. Since the beginning, he has been accompanied by his cousin and producer, Lousho. The first song that gained him some popularity was "Let a Nigga Smash", which he featured on with DBangz in late 2017.

=== 2018–2019: Pulp and Hijack ===
On May 3, 2018, Cochise self-released his debut mixtape Pulp, with production from Hella Sketchy, Lousho, and VashVash. He continued releasing songs throughout late 2018 and early 2019, with exclusive releases on SoundCloud. On August 23, 2019, he released his collab EP Hijack with Lousho. In late 2019, he released his single "Red Head", which later gained popularity alongside "Hatchback" in 2020.

=== 2020–2021: "Hatchback" and Benbow Crescent ===
Following the success of his singles "Red Head" and "Hatchback", Cochise signed to Columbia Records after being introduced by his manager, Solomon. Cox was featured on records by Lil Yachty in late 2020.

On May 7, 2021, Cox released Benbow Crescent, his debut studio album. Recorded between early 2020 and early 2021, five singles supported it; "Hatchback", "Lost It", "Knicks", "Usopp", and "Sanji". This album was an homage to Cox's Jamaican roots and included 18 featureless songs. Production was handled by Archie Cardella, ProdLouis, ProdbyCarlos, Lousho, and Cox himself. On May 28, 2021, he released his song "Tell Em" with rapper Snot which peaked at number 64 on the Billboard Hot 100. This became both rappers' first song to chart on the Billboard Hot 100. Riding off the success of "Tell Em", Cox released "Pocket Rocket" in August 2021, which gained popularity on TikTok.

=== 2022–2023: The Inspection and No One's Nice To Me ===
Cox began the rollout of his next album in January 2022 by wearing a tan colored trench coat, black glasses, and black gloves. He portrayed himself as an inspector and called himself "Mr. Professor". He set the theme of the upcoming album around the outfit. In early 2022, he released two album-supporting singles: "Do It Again" and "Turn It Up". On June 2, 2022, Cox announced his new album named The Inspection in a video of him painting while dressed up as Bob Ross. On June 14, 2022, it was revealed that Cox was a part of XXL's 2022 Freshman Class. On June 24, 2022, Cox released his second album The Inspection, which included features from Young Nudy and Chief Keef, among others. In December 2022, Cox had a TikTok that gained traction featuring an unheard snippet of his song "Cook Up". He soon after released the single on December 9.

In January 2023, Cox collaborated with the video game Rocket League. His songs "Pocket Rocket" and "Turn It Up" were featured in the game along with a new single titled "Long Way". In May 2023, Cox released the single "Kaneki," which was produced by Bnyx. On May 26, 2023, Cox released his second EP No One's Nice To Me, which sees him experiment with more aggressive instrumentals. Production was handled by Dreamz, Yaego, BNYX, and others. This is the first project by Cox that does not officially list Lousho as a collaborator or producer. On November 10, 2023, Cox released his third EP Care Package.

=== 2024–present: Multiple singles, Why Always Me?, and Trench Town ===
On January 26, 2024, Cox and other artists performed on "First Night" as a track on the collaborative album All Is Yellow. On February 16, 2024, Cox released the single "Yoshimitsu", produced by Orchid, Dreamz, and Venny. From March 8 to October 4, 2024, Cox released 5 singles, including "Geeked", "Jackpot", Lay Up", "4 AM", and "Nasty". On October 15, 2024, Cox announced his third studio album titled Why Always Me?. Cox followed this up with the single "Google Me", released on October 18, 2024. The album was released on October 25, 2024. Following a series of independent releases and the release of Why Always Me? throughout 2024.

Cox signed to ONErpm on August 3, 2025. According to Cochise, he said, “I always moved like an independent artist. So now, finally being fully in control with the support of ONErpm is a dream come true. Now it’s time to make some new history.” Cox released his first album after departing from Columbia Records titled Trench Town on June 19, 2026. It was supported by the singles “Hashtag” and “SRT”.

== Personal life ==
In an interview with Briana Lawrence of Crunchyroll, Cox stated how he's a big fan of anime. His favorite anime is One Piece and his favorite character is Monkey D. Luffy. Cox also enjoys drinking orange juice.

== Discography ==
=== Studio albums ===
Title	Album Details
Benbow Crescent	Released: May 7, 2021; Label: Columbia; Formats: Digital download, streaming
The Inspection	Released: June 24, 2022; Label: Columbia; Formats: Digital download, streaming
Why Always Me?	Released: October 25, 2024; Label: Columbia; Formats: Digital download, streaming
Trench Town	Released: June 19, 2026; Label: ONErpm; Formats: Digital download, streaming

=== Mixtapes ===
Title	Mixtape Details
Pulp	Released: May 3, 2018 (US); Label: Self-released; Formats: Digital download, streaming

=== Extended plays ===
Title	EP Details
Hijack (with Lousho)	Released: August 23, 2019; Label: Self-released; Formats: Digital download, streaming
No One's Nice To Me	Released: May 26, 2023; Label: Columbia; Formats: Digital download, streaming
Care Package	Released: November 10, 2023; Label: Columbia; Formats: Digital download, streaming

=== Singles ===
List of singles showing year released and album name (Note: Cox has numerous unlisted singles that are unofficially released on platforms such as SoundCloud and YouTube.)
Title	Year	Peak chart positions	Certifications	Album
Title	Year	US	Certifications	Album
"Sippin Sake"	2017	—		Non-album singles
"Daniel Bryan (Yes)"	2017	—		Non-album singles
"Bumba"	2018	—		Non-album singles
"WEAK"	2018	—		Non-album singles
"Baxter"	2018	—		Non-album singles
"My Year"	2019	—		Non-album singles
"Dolla"	2019	—		Non-album singles
"Let Me Know"	2019	—		Non-album singles
"Dig Me Freestyle"	2019	—		Non-album singles
"Riri"	2019	—		Non-album singles
"Stars"	2019	—		Non-album singles
"Hatchback"	2019	—	RIAA: Gold	Benbow Crescent
"Red Head"	2019	—		Non-album singles
"Spaceship"	2019	—		Non-album singles
"Elbow Room"	2020	—		Non-album singles
"Milo"	2020	—		Non-album singles
"Joans Garden"	2020	—		Non-album singles
"Yessir"	2020	—		Non-album singles
"Taxin"	2020	—		Non-album singles
"Lost It"	2020	—		Benbow Crescent
"Knicks"	2020	—		Benbow Crescent
"Usopp"	2021	—		Benbow Crescent
"Bratz (Remix)"	2021	—		Non-album singles
"Sanji"	2021	—		Benbow Crescent
"Tell Em" (with Snot)	2021	64	RIAA: 2× Platinum	Non-album singles
"Pocket Rocket"	2021	—	RIAA: Gold	Non-album singles
"Cautious"	2021	—		Non-album singles
"Do It Again"	2022	—		The Inspection
"Turn It Up"	2022	—		The Inspection
"Creme Brulee"	2022	—		Non-album singles
"Cook Up"	2022	—		Non-album singles
"Long Way"	2023	—		Non-album singles
"Perm"	2023	—		Non-album singles
"Kaneki"	2023	—		No One's Nice To Me
"Champions League"	2023	—		Care Package
"Lukaku"	2023	—		Care Package
"Hop In The Whip"	2023	—		Care Package
"Yoshimitsu"	2024	—		Why Always Me?
"Geeked"	2024	—		Non-album singles
"Jackpot"	2024	—		Non-album singles
"Lay Up"	2024	—		Non-album singles
"4AM"	2024	—		Why Always Me?
"Nasty" (with Aminé)	2024	—		Why Always Me?
"Google Me"	2024	—		Why Always Me?
"Bridge" (with Waera)	2026	—		Non-album singles
