= B4 the Storm =

Studio album by Internet Money
- Released: August 28, 2020
- Genre: Hip-hop
- Length: 48:12
- Label: Internet Money; TenThousand Projects
- Producer: Alec Wigdahl; Cxdy; DT; E-Trou; Jasper Harris; John Luther; KC Supreme; Nick Mira; Nico Baran; OkTanner; Pharaoh Vice; ProdByNash; Repko; Resource; Rio Leyva; Spaceman; Taz Taylor; Tim Henson; Vvspipes

Internet Money chronology
B4 the Storm (2020)	We All We Got EP (2022)

Singles from B4 the Storm
- 1. "Somebody" Released: October 10, 2019; 2. "Lemonade" Released: August 14, 2020; 3. "Thrusting" Released: August 21, 2020

Professional ratings
Review scores
Source	Rating
Clash	6/10
NME	3/5 stars
The Line of Best Fit	8/10

B4 the Storm is the debut studio album by American hip-hop collective and record label Internet Money. It was released on August 28, 2020 via Internet Money Records and TenThousand Projects. The album was completed in one month and contains many throwaway songs that were reworked. The album features guest appearances from TyFontaine, Trippie Redd, Lil Keed, Young Nudy, Iann Dior, Lil Skies, Lil Mosey, Cochise, TheHxliday, Lil Tecca, Swae Lee, Future, the Kid Laroi, late rapper and singer Juice Wrld, 24kGoldn, A Boogie wit da Hoodie, Wiz Khalifa, StaySolidRocky, LilSpirit, Kevin Gates, Gunna, Don Toliver, and Nav.

== Background ==
The album was first announced by Nick Mira and Taz Taylor in July 2020 during an interview with Lyrical Lemonade. Taylor stated: "We finalized our deal with 10K Projects in like August or September of last year [2019], but we had already been talking about an album for a minute. I brought it up to Elliot [Grainge] that I wanted to drop songs as an artist under Internet Money—just my favorite artists working together and putting songs together, like some DJ Khaled type." Taylor said he gave himself a deadline of June 1, 2020 to turn the album in: "So we did the whole album in a month, top to bottom: features, big artists, beats, everything. We mixed and mastered the whole album at least 50 different times". The tracklist was revealed on August 14, 2020, along with the release of the single "Lemonade". According to Taylor, B4 the Storm contains many "throwaway" songs that artists did not want. With the blessing of the artists, many of the songs were changed into completely new records.

== Cover art ==
Alex Zidel of HotNewHipHop described the original album artwork, which "show[ed] an amusement park with American rapper and singer Trippie Redd's face opening up to allow people entry to the rides, much like American rapper and singer Travis Scott did for the cover of his third studio album, Astroworld. There [was] a special section for American rapper Lil Tecca and a blimp flying above for the late American rapper and singer Juice Wrld as each member of the Internet Money collective goes on a thrill-seeking rollercoaster ride". The artwork was designed by Moodzanzan.

== Commercial performance ==
The album debuted and peaked at number 10 on the Billboard 200 during the chart week of September 12, 2020.

== Track listing ==
B4 the Storm track listing
No.	Title	Writer(s)	Producer(s)	Length
1.	"Lemonade" (with Gunna and Don Toliver featuring Nav)	Snodgrass; Mira; Wigdahl; H. Nichols; Latrou; Sergio Kitchens; Caleb Toliver; Navraj Goraya; Jonathan Mitchell; Jocelyn Donald; Flores	Taz Taylor; Nick Mira; Wigdahl; E-Trou; Pharaoh Vice	3:15
2.	"Blastoff" (with Diplo and Trippie Redd featuring Juice Wrld)	Snodgrass; Mira; William Repko II; Kim Candilora II; Henry Nichols; Jarad Higgins; White	Taz Taylor; Nick Mira; Repko; KC Supreme; Pharaoh Vice	2:54
3.	"Lost Me" (with Iann Dior and Lil Skies featuring Lil Mosey)	Snodgrass; Cody Rounds; Elias Iatrou; Lathan Echols; Michael Olmo; Kimetrius Foose	Taz Taylor; Cxdy; E-Trou	2:58
4.	"Lemonade (Remix)" (with Don Toliver and Roddy Ricch)	Snodgrass; Mira; Wigdahl; H. Nichols; Latrou; Toliver; Rodrick Moore, Jr.; Flores; Mitchell; Donald	Taz Taylor; Nick Mira; Wigdahl; E-Trou; Pharaoh Vice	3:01
5.	"Thrusting" (featuring Swae Lee and Future)	Snodgrass; Mira; Leyva; Rounds; Nathan Lamarche; Donny Flores; Edgard Herrera; Khalif Brown; Nayvadius Wilburn; Jasper Harris; Braylin Bowman	Taz Taylor; Nick Mira; Leyva; Cxdy; Resource; Harris; ProdByNash	3:42
6.	"Somebody" (with Lil Tecca and A Boogie wit da Hoodie)	Snodgrass; Mira; Sharpe; Artist Dubose	Taz Taylor; Nick Mira	2:54
7.	"Speak" (with the Kid Laroi)	Snodgrass; Leyva; Rounds; Nicholas Baran; Charlton Howard	Taz Taylor; Leyva; Cxdy; Nico Baran	2:02
8.	"JLO" (featuring Lil Tecca)	Snodgrass; Mira; Tyler-Justin Sharpe	Taz Taylor; Nick Mira	2:44
9.	"Giddy Up" (featuring Wiz Khalifa and 24kGoldn)	Snodgrass; Mira; Carolus; Theus; Cameron Thomaz; Jones	Taz Taylor; Nick Mira; John Luther; DT	2:38
10.	"No Option" (with Kevin Gates)	Snodgrass; Candilora; Maxwell Nichols; Kevin Gilyard	Taz Taylor; KC Supreme; mjNichols	3:22
11.	"Take It Slow" (with TyFontaine featuring 24kGoldn)	Snodgrass; Leyva; Rounds; Campbell; Golden Jones; Terrell; Rolston-Clemmer; Dorien Theus	Taz Taylor; Leyva; Cxdy; DT; Spaceman	3:54
12.	"Really Redd" (with Trippie Redd and Lil Keed featuring Young Nudy)	Snodgrass; Nicholas Mira; Michael White II; Raqhid Render; Quantavious Thomas	Taz Taylor; Nick Mira	3:06
13.	"Let You Down" (with TyFontaine and TheHxliday)	Snodgrass; Mira; Terrell; Lee	Taz Taylor; Nick Mira	2:42
14.	"Familiar" (with TheHxliday)	Snodgrass; Leyva; Tanner Katich; Noah Lee	Taz Taylor; Leyva; OkTanner	2:39
15.	"Block" (with Trippie Redd featuring StaySolidRocky)	Snodgrass; Mira; White; Darak Figueroa; Timothy Henson	Taz Taylor; Nick Mira; Tim Henson	2:34
16.	"Devastated" (with LilSpirit)	Snodgrass; Mira; Alec Wigdahl; Geno Gitas	Taz Taylor; Nick Mira; Wigdahl	2:20
17.	"Right Now" (with TyFontaine featuring Cochise)	Snodgrass; Rounds; John Carolus; Michael Pieper; Terrell Cox; Terrell	Taz Taylor; Cxdy; John Luther; Vvspipes	2:56
18.	"Message" (with TyFontaine)	Danny Snodgrass, Jr.; Rio Leyva; Nicco Catalano; Julius Terrell	Taz Taylor; Leyva; Neek	1:29
Total length:				48:12

== Charts ==
=== Weekly charts ===
Chart performance for B4 the Storm
Chart (2020)	Peak position
Australian Albums (ARIA)	43
Belgian Albums (Ultratop Flanders)	126
Canadian Albums (Billboard)	5
Danish Albums (Hitlisten)	28
Dutch Albums (Album Top 100)	54
Finnish Albums (Suomen virallinen lista)	32
French Albums (SNEP)	88
Norwegian Albums (VG-lista)	4
UK Albums (OCC)	73
US Billboard 200	10
US Top R&B/Hip-Hop Albums (Billboard)	6

=== Year-end charts ===
2020 year-end chart performance for B4 the Storm
Chart (2020)	Position
US Billboard 200	184
US Top R&B/Hip-Hop Albums (Billboard)	69

2021 year-end chart performance for B4 the Storm
Chart (2021)	Position
US Billboard 200	166
US Top R&B/Hip-Hop Albums (Billboard)	71

== Certifications ==
Certifications for B4 the Storm
Region	Certification	Certified units/sales
New Zealand (RMNZ)	Platinum	15,000^{‡}
United States (RIAA)	Gold	500,000^{‡}
^{‡} Sales+streaming figures based on certification alone.
