= Dro Kenji =

American rapper (born 2002)

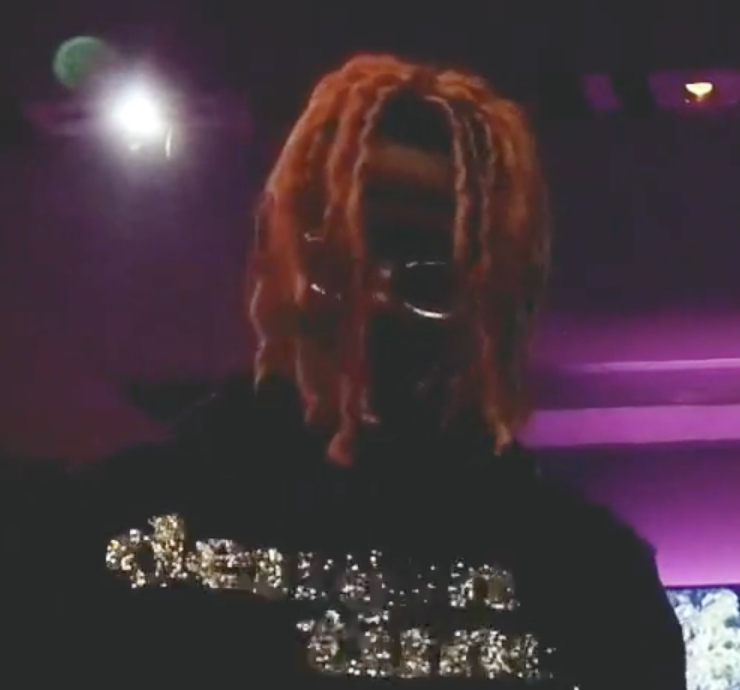
- Jenrette in 2022.

Background information
- Born: Daniel Jerome Jenrette; January 11, 2002 (age 24); Summerville, South Carolina, U.S.
- Genres: Experimental hip-hop; trap; emo rap
- Occupations: Rapper; songwriter; singer; record producer
- Years active: 2019–present
- Labels: MiraTouch; Internet Money; 10K Projects

Daniel Jerome Jenrette (born January 11, 2002), known professionally as Dro Kenji, is an American rapper. He signed with record producer Nick Mira's record label MiraTouch, as well as Internet Money Records and 10K Projects in 2020.

== Career ==
In 2019, at the age of 17, Dro Kenji started rapping. Kenji's name was inspired by his nickname "Dro," which his dad gave him, and he derived it from "Benji." However, he found "Benji" to be corny, so he reworded it to Kenji. In June 2021, he released his fourth studio album, F*ck Your Feelings. In January 2022, he released his fifth studio album, With or Without You, with appearances from Scorey, Highway, and Internet Money. In August 2022, he released his sixth studio album, Anywhere But Here, with appearances from DC the Don, Mike Dimes, NoCap, Ka$hdami, and midwxst. On August 18, 2023, he released his seventh studio album, Wish You Were Here, with appearances from Mike Dimes and Powers Pleasant. On February 14, 2025, Kenji would follow through with his eighth studio album, LOVE KILLS, the album was executively produced by Census. On June 12, 2026, Kenji released It Is What It Is.

== Artistry ==
Growing up, Kenji listened to artists such as Young Thug, Future, French Montana, Radiohead, Green Day, and Weezer.

== Personal life ==
Kenji's father was a member of the U.S. Army, he considered joining the army before he took rap seriously, because he didn't want to go to college. Kenji identifies himself as a spiritual person, and he likes taking scenic photos of nature. He always wears a purple jasper pendant, paired with an amethyst ring. In an interview with Everything Colossal, Kenji stated that his favorite anime is One Piece.

== Discography ==
=== Albums ===
Studio albums

Title	Album details
Tears and Pistols	Released: November 13, 2020; Label: Internet Money Records, MiraTouch, 10K Projects; Format: Digital download, LP, streaming
Race Me to Hell	Released: December 25, 2020; Label: Label: Internet Money Records, MiraTouch, 10K Projects; Format: Digital download, LP, streaming
Eat Your Heart Out	Released: February 26, 2021; Label: Internet Money Records, MiraTouch, 10K Projects; Format: Digital download, LP, streaming
Fuck Your Feelings	Released: June 18, 2021; Label: Label: Internet Money Records, MiraTouch, 10K Projects; Format: Digital download, LP, streaming
With or Without You	Released: January 28, 2022; Label: Label: Internet Money Records, MiraTouch, 10K Projects; Format: Digital download, LP, streaming
Anywhere but Here	Released: August 26, 2022; Label: Label: Internet Money Records, MiraTouch, 10K Projects; Format: Digital download, LP, streaming
Wish You Were Here	Released: August 18, 2023; Label: Label: Internet Money Records, MiraTouch, 10K Projects; Format: Digital download, LP, streaming

Compilation albums

Title	Album details
Headliners: Dro Kenji	Released: September 23, 2021; Label: Universal Music Group; Format: Digital download, streaming

=== Mixtapes ===
Title	Album details
Love Kills	Released: February 14, 2025; Label: 10K Projects; Format: Digital download, streaming

=== Extended plays ===
Title	EP details
Lost in Here	Released: August 5, 2022; Label: Internet Money Records, MiraTouch, 10K Projects; Format: Digital download, streaming

=== Singles ===
As lead artist

Title	Year	Album	Details
"Rokstarr"	2019	Non-album singles	Released: August 27, 2019; Label: Self-released; Format: Digital download, streaming
"Rob da Bank"	2019	Non-album singles	Released: October 16, 2019; Label: Self-released; Format: Digital download, streaming
"Knot" (with KobeKo)	2019	Non-album singles	Released: November 14, 2019; Label: Self-released; Format: Digital download, streaming
"Finnished" (featuring KobeKo)	2020	Get Up Wit Me!	Released: June 19, 2020; Label: HAPPINESS4SALE; Format: Digital download, streaming
"Save Me"	2020	Pistols and Tears	Released: November 10, 2020; Label: Self-released; Format: Digital download, streaming
"Up"	2020	Race Me to Hell	Released: December 4, 2020; Label: Self-released; Format: Digital download, streaming
"Houdini"	2020	Race Me to Hell	Released: December 21, 2020; Label: Self-released; Format: Digital download, streaming
"Superstar"	2021	F*ck Your Feelings	Released: April 2, 2021; Label: Internet Money Records, MiraTouch, 10K Projects; Format: Digital download, streaming
"Vanish"	2021	With or Without You	Released: October 29, 2021; Label: Internet Money Records, MiraTouch, 10K Projects; Format: Digital download, streaming
"Finders Keepers" (featuring Scorey & Internet Money)	2021	With or Without You	Released: December 10, 2021; Label: Internet Money Records, MiraTouch, 10K Projects; Format: Digital download, streaming
"Somebody I Know" (with Era)	2022	Non-album singles	Released: January 7, 2022; Label: Self-released; Format: Digital download, streaming
"They Don't Know"	2022	Anywhere but Here	Released: May 6, 2022; Label: Internet Money Records, MiraTouch, 10K Projects; Format: Digital download, streaming
"My World" (with KillBunk)	2022	Pilot	Released: June 29, 2022; Label: New 11 Records, Internet Money Records, MiraTouch, 10K Projects; Format: Digital download, streaming
"Step Back" (with Mike Dimes)	2022	Anywhere but Here	Released: August 25, 2022; Label: Internet Money Records, MiraTouch, 10K Projects; Format: Digital download, streaming
"Arsonist"	2023	WISH YOU WERE HERE	Released: April 14, 2023; Label: Internet Money Records, 10K Projects; Format: Digital download, streaming
"OVER & OVER"	2023	WISH YOU WERE HERE	Released: June 16, 2023; Label: Internet Money Records, 10K Projects; Format: Digital download, streaming
"UDntLuvMe"	2023	Non-album singles	Released: February 17, 2023; Label: Internet Money Records, 10K Projects; Format: Digital download, streaming
"CALM"	2023	Non-album singles	Released: December 1, 2023; Label: Internet Money Records, 10K Projects; Format: Digital download, streaming
"HEARTLESS"	2024	Non-album singles	Released: May 24, 2024; Label: Internet Money Records, 10K Projects; Format: Digital download, streaming
"Evil Twin"	2024	Non-album singles	Released: September 27, 2024; Label: Internet Money Records, 10K Projects; Format: Digital download, streaming
"AMSTERDAM"	2024	LOVE KILLS	Released: December 13, 2024; Label: Internet Money Records, 10K Projects; Format: Digital download, streaming

As featured artist

Title	Year	Album	Details
"Run em Down" (Graham Lake & Avelino featuring Dro Kenji)	2022	Non-album singles	Released: December 30, 2022; Label: Universal Music AB, EMI Sweden; Format: Digital download, streaming
"KISS 'N TELL" (Mike Dimes featuring Dro Kenji)	2023	Non-album singles	Released: March 24, 2023; Label: Since the 80's, CAMP BILLY; Format: Digital download, streaming
"No Lies" (Lucid Kidd featuring Dro Kenji)	2023	Non-album singles	Released: May 5, 2023; Label: Martynas Music, under exclusive license to INVTBL; Format: Digital download, streaming
"DO NOT DISTURB" (with Mike Dimes)	2023	Non-album singles	Released: October 13, 2023; Label: Since the 80's, CAMP BILLY; Format: Digital download, streaming
"In My Head" (DJ Topgun featuring Dro Kenji)	2024	IN MY HEAD / DAMN	Released: August 16, 2024; Label: Copyright Control, Rave Star; Format: Digital download, streaming
"Damn" (DJ Topgun featuring Dro Kenji)	2024	IN MY HEAD / DAMN	Released: August 16, 2024; Label: Copyright Control, Rave Star; Format: Digital download, streaming

== Musical style ==
Steve Juon writing for Rap Reviews describes Dro Kenji's music in the following manner: "His music is not an evolution, a revolution, or any kind of solution. It's just the same nihilistic world view of a generation that grew up in a world where you had to live it up fast because Death comes even faster."
