= Lemonade (Internet Money, Gunna and Don Toliver song) =

2020 single by Internet Money, Gunna and Don Toliver featuring Nav

Single by Internet Money, Gunna and Don Toliver featuring Nav

from the album B4 the Storm and Demons Protected by Angels
- Released: August 14, 2020
- Genre: Pop-trap
- Length: 3:15
- Label: Internet Money; TenThousand
- Songwriters: Danny Snodgrass, Jr.; Nicholas Mira; Alec Wigdahl; Henry Nichols; Elias Latrou; Sergio Kitchens; Caleb Toliver; Navraj Goraya; Jonathan Mitchell; Jocelyn Donald; Donny Flores
- Producers: Taz Taylor; Nick Mira; Wigdahl; E-Trou; Pharaoh Vice

Internet Money singles chronology
"Out of Love" (2020)	"Lemonade" (2020)	"Thrusting" (2020)

Gunna singles chronology
"Cafeteria" (2020)	"Lemonade" (2020)	"Famous" (2020)

Don Toliver singles chronology
"De La Hoya" (2020)	"Lemonade" (2020)	"Don't Like Me" (2020)

Nav singles chronology
"Painless 2" (2020)	"Lemonade" (2020)	"Young Wheezy" (2021)

Music video
- "Lemonade" on YouTube

"Lemonade" is a song by American hip hop collective and record label Internet Money and American rappers Gunna and Don Toliver featuring Canadian rapper Nav. It was released as the second single from Internet Money's debut studio album, B4 the Storm, on August 14, 2020. The song was produced by Internet Money producers Taz Taylor, Nick Mira, Alec Wigdahl, E-Trou, and Pharaoh Vice, who all wrote it with the rappers alongside John Mitchell, Jozzy, and Donny Flores. On September 14, 2022, it was included as the sole bonus track on Nav's fourth studio album, Demons Protected by Angels, which was released five days before. The official music video premiered later the same day as the song on Lyrical Lemonade and followed a SpongeBob SquarePants theme. The first remix of the song added a verse from Toliver along with another verse from fellow American rapper Roddy Ricch, omitting Gunna and Nav; this was released on September 30, 2020, and was included on the complete edition of B4 the Storm. The second and final remix, titled the Latin remix, adds Puerto Rican rapper Anuel AA to the original song and was released on November 20, 2020.

"Lemonade" peaked at number six on the US Billboard Hot 100 and topped the charts in the United Kingdom, Greece, and Portugal. The song also peaked within the top ten of the charts in several other countries, including Australia, Canada, Denmark, Germany, New Zealand, the Republic of Ireland and Sweden, which became the highest-charting single for all artists except for Gunna. The success of the song on social media, especially TikTok, during the COVID-19 lockdowns in 2020 was very influential to its chart success and viral status.

== Background ==
"Lemonade" was first teased by Internet Money founder and producer Taz Taylor during an Instagram Live video in June 2020. The same month, producer Nick Mira confirmed a collaboration between Gunna, Don Toliver, and Nav on Twitter, while Gunna also previewed the song on Instagram. The track was officially announced by the producers in a July interview with music video company Lyrical Lemonade, who worked on the song's official music video.

The song was conceived in 2017 by Taylor, Jozzy, and Johnny Yukon, and Toliver ended up on the song after their now-former record label, Artist Partner Group, offered Taylor old songs by Toliver. He received the original and a capella versions without Toliver's knowledge. Producer Only1Zay later added the guitar to the track. Taylor originally planned to have Toliver's label boss, Travis Scott, on the song, because the guitar melody reminded him of his single, "Yosemite", which also featured both Gunna and Nav, from his third studio album, Astroworld (2018). The collaboration came to full circle when Gunna was added to the song, which then led to Nav's feature, due to Gunna's close relationship with Nav and the record label that he is signed to, XO. Toliver later gave his approval for the song. At the same time, Gunna and Toliver were working together with the former's DJ, Chase B, on the latter two's single, "Cafeteria", which was released exactly three weeks prior to "Lemonade". Gunna thought he had recorded a verse for only the former track, but Taylor said that Gunna actually recorded verses for both songs without knowing. "Lemonade" was finished and mixed in mid-2020 along with the rest of its parent album, B4 the Storm. It experienced numerous leaks before being officially released.

== Composition ==
Over a "bouncy", guitar-laden beat, the song sees Gunna and Nav delivering their "usual rockstar talk" on their respective verses, with Toliver performing both the pre-chorus and chorus. Uproxx's Wongo Okon noted how the artists are "fascinated by the shine and icy nature of their yellow diamonds" as they "relish in their successful careers".

== Critical reception ==
Revolt's Jon Powell called the song "infectious". Erika Marie of HotNewHipHop gave it a "VERY HOTTTTT" rating, opining that with the "hitmaking trifecta" on the track, "it's sure to quickly be in heavy rotation among rap fans". Complex's Jessica McKinney named it among the best releases of the week, and noted Gunna and Nav for being "emotional as they lay down intoxicating verses about their rags-to-riches stories and heavy drug use". Ryan Shepard of Def Pen called the track a "summer banger" and referenced the COVID-19 pandemic, an ongoing pandemic at the time of the release of the song, stating that "you'll just have to enjoy it from your own backyard and patio".

== Music videos ==
The official music video for the original version of the song was released later the same day as its release. It was directed by Cole Bennett for his Lyrical Lemonade channel. Bennett had listened to its parent album, B4 the Storm, prior to the video shoot and expressed his love for "Lemonade". Internet Money producers Nick Mira and Taz Taylor recalled how cooperative Bennett and his team were despite the weather being very hot. The visual is reminiscent of the Nickelodeon television show SpongeBob SquarePants and sees the artists living "lavish" lifestyles underwater as they swim in a fishbowl of lemonade. Gunna is sitting above in a boat fishing, while Toliver and Nav are seen around mermaids and other sea creatures. Revolt's Jon Powell noted how they show off "futuristic old-school whips and high ends jewelry and threads to match".

The music video for the remix with Roddy Ricch was released on October 27, 2020, on Internet Money's YouTube channel. In the video, Taz Taylor and Nick Mira cruise around a city in a lemonade truck, giving out lemonade to people. The truck contains logos from Cole Bennett's association Lyrical Lemonade, who also directed the original music video. It also shows a banner promoting the song's parent album, B4 the Storm. The video also contains cameos from Toliver himself and fellow American rapper and singer Lil Nas X.

== Charts ==
=== Weekly charts ===
Weekly chart performance for "Lemonade"
Chart (2020–2021)	Peak position
Argentina Hot 100 (Billboard)	92
Australia (ARIA)	5
Austria (Ö3 Austria Top 40)	2
Belgium (Ultratop 50 Flanders)	13
Belgium (Ultratop 50 Wallonia)	29
Canada Hot 100 (Billboard)	3
Czech Republic Singles Digital (ČNS IFPI)	11
Denmark (Tracklisten)	2
Finland (Suomen virallinen lista)	6
France (SNEP)	13
Germany (GfK)	2
Global 200 (Billboard)	4
Greece (IFPI)	1
Hungary (Rádiós Top 40)	17
Hungary (Single Top 40)	17
Hungary (Stream Top 40)	2
Iceland (Tónlistinn)	11
Ireland (IRMA)	3
Italy (FIMI)	49
Lithuania (AGATA)	4
Netherlands (Dutch Top 40)	14
Netherlands (Single Top 100)	3
New Zealand (Recorded Music NZ)	2
Norway (VG-lista)	2
Portugal (AFP)	1
Romania (Airplay 100)	51
Scotland Singles (OCC)	45
Singapore (RIAS)	21
Slovakia Singles Digital (ČNS IFPI)	6
Spain (Promusicae)	61
Sweden (Sverigetopplistan)	3
Switzerland (Schweizer Hitparade)	3
UK Singles (OCC)	1
UK Hip Hop/R&B (OCC)	2
US Billboard Hot 100	6
US Hot R&B/Hip-Hop Songs (Billboard)	3
US Pop Airplay (Billboard)	28
US Rhythmic Airplay (Billboard)	1
US Rolling Stone Top 100	1

=== Year-end charts ===
2020 year-end chart performance for "Lemonade"
Chart (2020)	Position
Australia (ARIA)	73
Austria (Ö3 Austria Top 40)	26
Canada (Canadian Hot 100)	68
Denmark (Tracklisten)	48
France (SNEP)	136
Germany (Official German Charts)	34
Hungary (Stream Top 40)	23
Iceland (Tónlistinn)	66
Netherlands (Dutch Top 40)	94
Netherlands (Single Top 100)	40
Norway (VG-lista)	28
Portugal (AFP)	25
Sweden (Sverigetopplistan)	60
Switzerland (Schweizer Hitparade)	29
UK Singles (OCC)	59
US Hot R&B/Hip-Hop Songs (Billboard)	51

2021 year-end chart performance for "Lemonade"
Chart (2021)	Position
Australia (ARIA)	50
Canada (Canadian Hot 100)	52
Denmark (Tracklisten)	75
France (SNEP)	114
Germany (Official German Charts)	98
Global 200 (Billboard)	31
Hungary (Rádiós Top 40)	58
Hungary (Stream Top 40)	41
New Zealand (Recorded Music NZ)	44
Portugal (AFP)	36
Switzerland (Schweizer Hitparade)	82
UK Singles (OCC)	77
US Billboard Hot 100	51
US Hot R&B/Hip-Hop Songs (Billboard)	30
US Rhythmic (Billboard)	18

== Certifications ==
Certifications for "Lemonade"
Region	Certification	Certified units/sales
Australia (ARIA)	3× Platinum	210,000^{‡}
Belgium (BRMA)	2× Platinum	80,000^{‡}
Brazil (Pro-Música Brasil)	Diamond	160,000^{‡}
Canada (Music Canada)	4× Platinum	320,000^{‡}
Denmark (IFPI Danmark)	2× Platinum	180,000^{‡}
France (SNEP)	Diamond	333,333^{‡}
Germany (BVMI)	Platinum	400,000^{‡}
Italy (FIMI)	Platinum	70,000^{‡}
Mexico (AMPROFON)	Gold	30,000^{‡}
New Zealand (RMNZ)	4× Platinum	120,000^{‡}
Poland (ZPAV)	Platinum	50,000^{‡}
Portugal (AFP)	3× Platinum	30,000^{‡}
Spain (Promusicae)	Gold	30,000^{‡}
United Kingdom (BPI)	2× Platinum	1,200,000^{‡}
United States (RIAA)	4× Platinum	4,000,000^{‡}
Streaming
Greece (IFPI Greece)	Platinum	2,000,000^{†}
^{‡} Sales+streaming figures based on certification alone.^{†} Streaming-only figures based on certification alone.

== Release history ==
Release dates for "Lemonade"
Region	Date	Format	Label	Ref.
Various	August 14, 2020	Digital download, streaming	Internet Money; TenThousand	
Various	August 14, 2020	Contemporary hit radio	Internet Money; TenThousand	
Various	September 30, 2020	Remix	Internet Money; TenThousand	

== See also ==
- List of Billboard Hot 100 top-ten singles in 2020
- List of number-one singles of 2020 (Portugal)
- List of Rolling Stone Top 100 number-one songs of 2020
- List of top 10 singles in 2020 (Australia)
- List of top 10 singles in 2020 (Ireland)
- List of UK top-ten singles in 2020
