= Internet Money Records =

American record label and record producer collective

- Parent company: Warner Music Group
- Founded: 2015; 11 years ago
- Founder: Taz Taylor (CEO)
- Distributors: Ten Thousand Projects Virgin Music (current) Alamo Records Interscope Records (former); (in the US); Universal Music Group; (outside the US)
- Genre: Hip-hop; trap; alternative R&B; emo rap; pop rap
- Country of origin: United States
- Location: Los Angeles, California
- Official website: internetmoneyrecords.com

Internet Money Records, often credited as Internet Money, is an American record label and record producer collective. It was founded in 2015 by American record producer Taz Taylor, who is the chief executive officer (CEO). The producer collective consists of Taylor himself, Nick Mira, Rio Leyva, Zia Mian, Thankyouwill, Mason Wu, Vendrbeats, Noah Mejia, Spaceman, Cxdy, E-Trou, KC Supreme, Pharaoh Vice, Census, Paryo, and Birdman Zoe. A blend of a YouTube channel, record label, and producer union, Internet Money is a medium and agency for producers, as well as an aggregator.

As a collective outfit, Internet Money has produced for multiple songs that have proved commercially successful on the Billboard Hot 100. Members of the collective have produced for artists such as Lil Tecca, Juice Wrld, Trippie Redd, the Kid Laroi, Lil Tjay and YoungBoy Never Broke Again, among others. On August 28, 2020, Internet Money released their debut album, B4 the Storm, which peaked at number ten on the Billboard 200. It was supported by the single, "Lemonade" (with Gunna, Don Toliver, and Nav), which peaked at number six on the Billboard Hot 100. Their beats are known for their heavy use of the 808.

== History ==
In 2016, American record producer Taz Taylor started Internet Money Records. Taylor believes that Internet Money is a way to help producers make money off of music using the same techniques he uses. In 2018, Internet Money signed a record deal with Alamo and Interscope Records. During a stint in mid-2019, Taylor's relationship with Alamo and Interscope soured. By late summer, Taylor had agreed to a buyout with Alamo and Interscope and signed a new record deal with TenThousand Projects and Virgin Music, giving him more control of who he could sign to the joint venture. On August 16, 2018, Internet Money was featured alongside American rapper 03 Greedo on fellow American rapper Mozzy's single, "Free Greedo".

On October 11, 2019, Internet Money released a collaboration with American rappers Lil Tecca and A Boogie wit da Hoodie, "Somebody", as the collective's debut single. The song entered at number 96 on the US Billboard Hot 100 and received platinum certification by the Recording Industry Association of America (RIAA). On April 17, 2020, they were featured on Lil Tecca's single, "Out of Love", from the latter's debut studio album, Virgo World. On August 14, 2020, they released a collaboration with American rapper Gunna and American singer Don Toliver, "Lemonade", which features Canadian rapper Nav. The song reached number six on the Hot 100, becoming Internet Money's highest-charting song, and received triple platinum certification by the RIAA. Exactly a week later, they released the promotional single, "Thrusting", which features American rappers Swae Lee and Future. Internet Money released their debut studio album, B4 the Storm, on August 28, 2020. The album debuted and peaked at number 10 on the US Billboard 200 and received gold certification by the RIAA. "Somebody" and "Lemonade" were the lead and second singles of the album, while "Thrusting" was the sole promotional single. After the release of the album, "Lemonade" received two remixes. The first remix of the song, which replaces Gunna and Nav with American rapper Roddy Ricch, was released on September 30, 2020. It was added as the only new addition to the complete edition of the album, which was released on October 23, 2020. The second remix of "Lemonade", which is a Latin remix that adds Gunna and Nav back and replaces Roddy Ricch with Puerto Rican rapper Anuel AA, was released on November 20, 2020. On the same day the latter remix was released, Internet Money released a collaboration with Lil Gnar and Lil Keed, "Hey!".

On March 26, 2021, Internet Money released a collaboration with Lil Tecca and American rapper Lil Mosey, "Jetski", which possibly is the lead single of the collective's upcoming second studio album. On April 8, 2021, they were featured alongside American rapper Lil Skies on fellow American rapper Snot's single, "Whipski". On May 13, 2021, they released a collaboration with Don Toliver and American rapper Lil Uzi Vert, "His & Hers", which features Gunna, as the potential second single of their next album. The song debuted and peaked at number 67 on the Billboard Hot 100 and received gold certification by the RIAA. On July 29, 2021, they released a collaboration with Hong Kong singer Jackson Wang, "Drive You Home". On December 10, 2021, they released a collaboration with American rappers Dro Kenji and Scorey, "Finders Keepers". On January 21, 2022, Internet Money released a collaboration with American rapper YoungBoy Never Broke Again, "Flossin'", as the possible third single of their next album, but appeared as the only new track to the deluxe edition to YoungBoy's commercial mixtape, Colors, which was taken down later. The song debuted and peaked at number 72 on the Hot 100. On March 24, 2023, Internet Money released a collaboration single "I Remember" with Roddy Ricch and Kodak Black.

== Artists ==
=== Current acts ===
Act	Year signed	Releases (under the label)
Haring Manggi	2019	5
Toni Fowler	2019	1
Turbo	2020	2

== Discography ==
=== Studio albums ===
Studio album, with selected details
Title	Details	Peak chart positions										Certifications
Title	Details	US	US R&B/HH	US Rap	AUS	CAN	FRA	BEL (FL)	NLD	NOR	UK	Certifications
B4 the Storm	Released: August 28, 2020; Label: Internet Money, TenThousand Projects; Format: Digital download, streaming, CD, LP	10	6	7	43	7	88	126	54	4	73	RIAA: Gold
We All We Needed	Released: August 14, 2026; Label: Internet Money; Format: Digital download, streaming, CD, LP	—	—	—	—	—	—	—	—	—	—	

=== Extended plays ===
Title	Album details
We All We Got	Released: August 19, 2022; Label: Internet Money, TenThousand Projects; Format: Digital download, streaming

=== Singles ===
==== As lead artist ====
Title	Year	Peak chart positions							Certifications	Album
Title	Year	US	US R&B/HH	US Rap	CAN	IRE	NZ	UK	Certifications	Album
"Somebody" (with Lil Tecca and A Boogie wit da Hoodie)	2019	96	44	—	54	93	— (Note: "Somebody" did not enter the NZ Top 40 Singles Chart, but peaked at number 16 on the NZ Hot Singles Chart.)	75	RIAA: Platinum; MC: Platinum	B4 the Storm
"Lemonade" (with Gunna featuring Don Toliver and Nav)	2020	6	3	3	3	3	2	1	RIAA: 4× Platinum; MC: 4× Platinum; BPI: Platinum; ARIA: 3× Platinum; RMNZ: 4× Platinum	B4 the Storm
"Hey!" (with Lil Gnar and Lil Keed)	2020	—	—	—	—	—	—	—		Non-album single
"Jetski" (with Lil Tecca and Lil Mosey)	2021	— (Note: "Jetski" did not enter the Billboard Hot 100, but peaked at number 19 on the Bubbling Under Hot 100 chart.)	—	—	88	—	—	—		Non-album singles
"His & Hers" (with Don Toliver and Lil Uzi Vert featuring Gunna)	2021	67	34	—	53	—	— (Note: "His & Hers" did not enter the NZ Top 40 Singles Chart, but peaked at number 9 on the NZ Hot Singles Chart.)	—	RIAA: Gold; RMNZ: Gold	Non-album singles
"Drive You Home" (with Jackson Wang)	2021	—	—	—	—	—	—	—		Non-album single
"Finders Keepers" (with Dro Kenji and Scorey)	2021	—	—	—	—	—	—	—		With or Without You
"Flossin'" (with YoungBoy Never Broke Again)	2022	72	27	20	—	—	— (Note: "Flossin'" did not enter the NZ Top 40 Singles Chart, but peaked at number 25 on the New Zealand Hot Singles Chart.)	—		Colors
"Options" (featuring 24kGoldn)	2022	—	—	—	—	—	— (Note: "Options" did not enter the NZ Top 40 Singles Chart, but peaked at number 28 on the NZ Hot Singles Chart.)	—		Non-album single
"She Want Some More" (with Lil Tecca featuring Ken Carson)	2022	—	—	—	—	—	—	—		We All We Got
"I Remember" (with Roddy Ricch and Kodak Black)	2023	—	41	—	—	—	— (Note: "Internet Money" did not enter the NZ Top 40 Singles Chart, but peaked at number 24 on the NZ Hot Singles Chart.)	—		Non-album singles
"Keep It Cool" (with Rich Amiri)	2024	—	—	—	—	—	— (Note: "Keep It Cool" did not enter the NZ Top 40 Singles Chart, but peaked at number 32 on the NZ Hot Singles Chart.)	—		Non-album singles
"—" denotes a recording that did not chart or was not released in that territory.

==== As featured artist ====
Title	Year	Peak chart positions		Certifications	Album
Title	Year	US Bub.	NZ Hot	Certifications	Album
"Free Greedo" (Mozzy featuring 03 Greedo and Internet Money)	2018	—	—		Non-album singles
"Code" (Wavy-E featuring Internet Money)	2020	—	—		Non-album singles
"Out of Love" (Lil Tecca featuring Internet Money)	2020	—	15	RMNZ: Gold	Virgo World
"Girls Wanna Have Fun" (Lil HBK featuring Internet Money)	2020	—	—		Non-album singles
"Feelings" (SSGKobe featuring Internet Money)	2020	—	—		Non-album singles
"Phone Call" (Jayy Queezy featuring Internet Money)	2020	—	—		Non-album singles
"Whipski" (Snot featuring Lil Skies and Internet Money)	2021	25	13		Non-album singles
"House Party" (DCG Brothers, DCG Shun, and DCG Bsavv featuring Internet Money)	2021	—	—		Non-album singles
"Last Night" (Lil Saddyz featuring BabyxxJay and Internet Money)	2021	—	—		Non-album singles
"Loyalty" (22Gz featuring Internet Money)	2022	—	—		Non-album singles
"—" denotes a recording that did not chart or was not released in that territory.

==== Promotional singles ====
List of singles as featured artist, with selected chart positions and certifications shown
Title	Year	Album
"Thrusting" (featuring Swae Lee and Future)	2021	B4 the Storm

=== Other charted songs ===
Title	Year	Peak chart positions				Certifications	Album
Title	Year	US	US R&B/HH	CAN	NZ Hot	Certifications	Album
"Speak" (with the Kid Laroi)	2020	—	—	—	16		B4 the Storm
"Blastoff" (featuring Juice Wrld and Trippie Redd)	2020	79	26	63	5	MC: Platinum; RMNZ: Gold	B4 the Storm
"Tragic" (The Kid Laroi featuring YoungBoy Never Broke Again and Internet Money)	2020	76	30	59	2	RIAA: Platinum; ARIA: Gold; MC: Platinum; RMNZ: Gold	F*ck Love (Savage)
"—" denotes a recording that did not chart or was not released in that territory.

=== Guest appearance ===
Title	Year	Other performer(s)	Album
"Tragic"	2020	The Kid Laroi, YoungBoy Never Broke Again	F*ck Love (Savage)
