= Taz Taylor (music producer) =

American record producer (born 1992)

- Born: Danny Lee Snodgrass Jr. October 20, 1992 (age 34); Jacksonville, Florida, U.S.
- Origin: Los Angeles, California, U.S.
- Genres: Hip hop; trap; R&B; emo rap
- Occupations: Record producer; songwriter; record executive
- Years active: 2010–present
- Labels: Warner/Chappell; APG; Atlantic; TenThousand; Virgin Music; Internet Money (current); Alamo; Interscope (former)

Danny Lee Snodgrass Jr. (born October 20, 1992), professionally known as Taz Taylor, is an American record producer, songwriter, and record executive, as well as the founder of the Internet Money collective and record label.

He is signed to Warner Chappell Music, Artist Publishing Group and Atlantic Records on the publishing side, while currently signed as Internet Money Records with Ten Thousand Projects and Virgin Music on the label side. He formerly signed a record deal with Alamo Records and Interscope Records.

== Early life ==
Danny Lee Snodgrass Jr. was born on October 20, 1992, in Jacksonville, Florida, where he was also raised. His father, the drummer for a local band, brought him to band practice where he began learning the drums, and guitar. Taylor lost interest in playing instruments as he grew up and dropped out of school in 7th grade. At the age of 17, his mother was diagnosed with cancer, and Taylor looked for a new way of earning income. After a brief stint as a graphic designer, Taylor turned to production. He sold his first beat online for $250, and began to produce full-time.

== Career ==
After realizing that he could make money selling beats online, Taylor pawned many of his possessions to furnish his in-home studio. As he developed his beat creation, he also developed his business strategy, which at first revolved around using Twitter and PayPal to sell his beats to any artist who wanted them. Taylor sells his creations via a one-time payment for usage of his material, eschewing the more complicated publishing and songwriting deals traditionally preferred by producers. In 2016, Taylor placed songs with Trey Songz and Desiigner, which were his first major placements. This led to a publishing deal signed in August 2017 with Warner Chappell Music, Artist Publishing Group and Atlantic Records, which allowed him to lease his works in the traditional way, as well as independently sell beats via his Internet Money YouTube channel.

== Internet Money Records ==
Internet Money Records is a record label and record producer collective founded by Taz Taylor, Nick Mira, and DT (formerly known as Sidepce), with Taylor being CEO. A blend of a YouTube channel, a record label, and a producer union, Internet Money is a medium for producers to sell beats, as well as an aggregator for producers and creatives. Beyond helping other producers with the business side of making music, Taylor and Internet Money host "tours", where producers can collaborate and work together. Taylor believes that Internet Money is a way to help producers make money off of music using the same techniques he uses. In 2018, Internet Money Records signed a record deal with Alamo Records and Interscope Records. During a stint in mid-2019, Taz's relationship with Alamo and Interscope soured. By late summer, Taz had agreed to a buyout with Alamo and Interscope and signed a new record deal with TenThousand Projects and Virgin Music, giving him more control of who he could sign to the joint venture.

As a producer collective, Internet Money has been responsible for multiple singles that have ascended to the Billboard Hot 100, and has earned the RIAA Platinum and Gold certificates as well.

The label released their debut album, B4 the Storm on August 28, 2020. It includes vocals from Future, Kevin Gates, Gunna, Don Toliver, Nav, Trippie Redd, Juice Wrld, 24kGoldn, Iann Dior and the Kid Laroi, among others.

== Personal life ==
In 2025, Taz stated on his Instagram story that he is not very religious, while also emphasising the importance of living with kindness, gratitude, and unity.

== Production credits ==
Taz Taylor has produced for Juice WRLD, Drake, Lil Skies, Tay-K, Trippie Redd, and many others. In 2019, he collaborated with fellow producer Nick Mira on the song, "Ransom", by Lil Tecca, later becoming a top five hit on the Billboard Hot 100.

=== 2017 ===
- "Fuck Love" – XXXTentacion, featuring Trippie Redd (produced with Nick Mira & Dex Duncan)
- "Freestyle (Lil Baby song)" - Lil Baby (produced with JRHITMAKER & Joseph DaVinci)

=== 2018 ===
- "Candles" – Juice Wrld (produced Nick Mira)

=== 2019 ===
- "Ransom" – Lil Tecca (produced with Nick Mira)
- "Shots" – Lil Tecca (produced with Nick Mira)

=== 2020 ===
- "Smile" – Juice WRLD & The Weeknd (produced with Cxdy & Nick Mira)
- Internet Money - B4 the Storm (Complete Edition)

=== 2021 ===
- "Dangerous" – Dro Kenji (produced with Nick Mira & John Luther)
- "Hades" – Dro Kenji (produced with DT, Nick Mira)
- "Lambo Truck" – Dro Kenji (produced with Brian Lee & Nick Mira)
- "Expensive" – Dro Kenji (produced with Nico Baran, Nick Mira, Census & Cxdy)
- "Lonely and F*cked Up" – The Kid LAROI (produced with Nick Mira and Cxdy)

=== 2022 ===
- "Codeine Cowboy" – Internet Money, feat. Lil Yachty (produced with Nick Mira)
- "BackOutsideBoyz" – Drake

=== 2023 ===
- "500lbs" – Lil Tecca (produced with Rio Leyva & 4OUR)
- "Spinnin" – EST Gee and Lil Durk (produced with E-Trou, Ryder Johnson, Humblebee)

=== 2024 ===
- "Magic Johnson" – Ian (produced with Qioh, thankyoudesmos, Rio Leyva)
- "Bad Time" - Lil Tecca (produced with Census)
- "Rockstar Girl" - Don Toliver (produced with Georgie, Noah Mejia)

=== 2025 ===
- "Owa Owa" – Lil Tecca (produced with Rio Leyva)

==== Non-album singles ====
- "His & Hers" - Internet Money (featuring Don Toliver, Gunna, and Lil Uzi Vert) (produced with Nick Mira, Alec Wigdahl, Pharaoh Vice, and Cxdy)
- "V12" (iann dior [feat. Lil Uzi Vert]) (produced with Nick Mira and Cxdy)
- "Beautiful" (Rot Ken and SoFaygo) (produced with jetsonmade, Nick Mira, Neeko Baby, John Luther, and Paryo)
- "FINDERS KEEPERS" (Dro Kenji and Scorey) (produced with Nash Beats and Nick Mira)
