= Sheesh =

Sheesh may refer to:

- "Sheesh", a song by Benee from her 2020 album Hey U X
- "Sheesh", a 2023 song by Mirror
- "Sheesh!", a 2021 song by Surfaces
- "Sheesh" (BabyMonster song), a 2024 song by Babymonster
- Taylor Sheesh (born 1994), Filipino drag queen
