= Love or Lust =

Love or Lust may refer to:

== Music ==
- Love or Lust?, a 1991 album by American singer Adeva
- Love or Lust (album), by Cash Cash

=== Songs ===
- "Love or Lust" (song), by 24kGoldn
- "Love Or Lust", a 1992 song by Debbie Gibson from the single "Shock Your Mama"
- "Love or Lust", a song by Ken Hirai from the album Gaining Through Losing
