= 3, 2, 1 (24kGoldn song) =

2021 single by 24kGoldn

Single by 24kGoldn

from the album El Dorado
- Released: February 19, 2021
- Length: 2:11
- Label: Records; Columbia
- Songwriters: Golden Von Jones; Tatiauna Matthews; Donald Andrews; Nicholas Mira; Kim Candilora II; Rio Leyva; Omer Fedi; Blake Slatkin
- Producers: Nick Mira; KC Supreme; Leyva; Fedi; Slatkin

24kGoldn singles chronology
"Coco" (2020)	"3, 2, 1" (2021)	"Love or Lust" (2021)

Music video
- "3, 2, 1" on YouTube

"3, 2, 1" is a song by American rapper 24kGoldn, released on February 19, 2021, as the third single from his debut studio album El Dorado (2021). The song was produced by Nick Mira, KC Supreme, Rio Leyva, Omer Fedi and Blake Slatkin.

== Composition ==
The song contains a bassline and guitar riff in production, as well as "thunderous distorted power chords" during the chorus. 24kGoldn reflects on a turbulent relationship, and being lied to by his partner.

== Music video ==
The music video was directed by Austin Peters and released alongside the single.

== Live performances ==
24kGoldn performed the song on The Tonight Show Starring Jimmy Fallon in March 2021.

== Charts ==
Chart performance for "3, 2, 1"
Chart (2021)	Peak position
Canada Hot 100 (Billboard)	80
New Zealand Hot Singles (RMNZ)	20
US Hot Rock & Alternative Songs (Billboard)	19

== Certifications ==
Certifications for "3, 2, 1"
Region	Certification	Certified units/sales
Canada (Music Canada)	Platinum	80,000^{‡}
United States (RIAA)	Gold	500,000^{‡}
^{‡} Sales+streaming figures based on certification alone.
