= 24kGoldn =

American singer (born 2000)

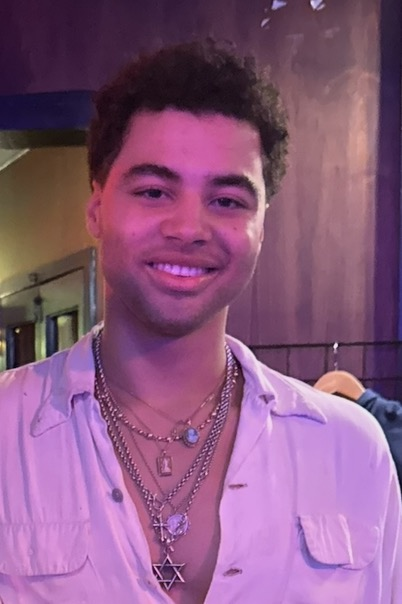
- 24kGoldn in 2025

Background information
- Also known as: Goldn; El Dorado
- Born: Golden Landis Von Jones; November 13, 2000 (age 26); San Francisco, California, U.S.
- Genres: Pop; trap; pop rap
- Occupations: Singer; songwriter; rapper
- Instrument: Vocals
- Years active: 2016–present
- Labels: RECORDS; Columbia
- Producer(s): D.A. Got That Dope, Omer Fedi
- Website: 24kgoldn.com

Golden Landis Von Jones (born November 13, 2000), known professionally as 24kGoldn, is an American singer, songwriter, and rapper. He initially saw recognition for his 2019 single "Valentino", which marked his first entry on the Billboard Hot 100, received double platinum certification by the Recording Industry Association of America (RIAA), and led him to sign with Barry Weiss' Records, an imprint of Columbia Records. His 2020 single, "Mood" (featuring Iann Dior), peaked atop the Billboard Hot 100 for 8 non consecutive weeks, and led his debut studio album El Dorado (2021), which peaked at number 22 on the Billboard 200.

== Early life and education ==
Golden Landis Von Jones was born on November 13, 2000, in San Francisco, California, to Kimberly Landis, an Ashkenazi Jewish mother, and Torino Von Jones, an African-American Catholic father. He has a younger sister named Sage Landis Von Jones. Both of his parents worked as fashion models before he was born. He was raised celebrating both Christmas and Hanukkah, and attended Hebrew school. As a child, 24kGoldn acted in commercials. He sang in the choir in middle school and high school, and, with that, the importance of music in his life grew with his "own growth". Before he realized he could do music professionally, he planned on becoming a hedge fund manager. 24kGoldn attended Lowell High School, a selective public high school, where he graduated in 2018.

24kGoldn attended the University of Southern California's Marshall School of Business, joking that they accepted him because of a double entendre in "Valentino", where he joined the Beta-Sigma Chapter of Tau Kappa Epsilon fraternity, as a Spring 2019 initiate. He took a leave of absence from school to pursue his rap career. 24kGoldn stated that he was not anticipating "that things were going to happen so fast when I came to USC", and did not think he would finish University, but he wanted to round off the school year to further develop the relationships he made, stating his love for being on campus, and that being a student kept him "grounded".

== Career ==
In 2017, 24kGoldn released his first music video for his first song, titled "Trappers Anthem". In January 2019, he released the single, titled "Valentino", which received over 350 million plays on Spotify. He received his first record deal through producer D.A. Doman. 24kGoldn got his big break through his "high-energy" single "Valentino". However, in 2020, the artist said that "those ['Valentino'] were recorded over a year ago and don't exactly reflect the person I have become since then". In November 2019, 24kGoldn released his debut extended play (EP), titled Dropped Outta College, and he signed a record deal with Records, LLC and Columbia Records. In 2020, 24kGoldn gained further attention with single, titled "City of Angels", which was officially released to US alternative radio on March 31; as well as he follow with an official remix of the song by English singer-songwriter Yungblud, released in May 2020. On May 20, 24kGoldn was featured on the remix of Olivia O'Brien's single "Josslyn". Candles

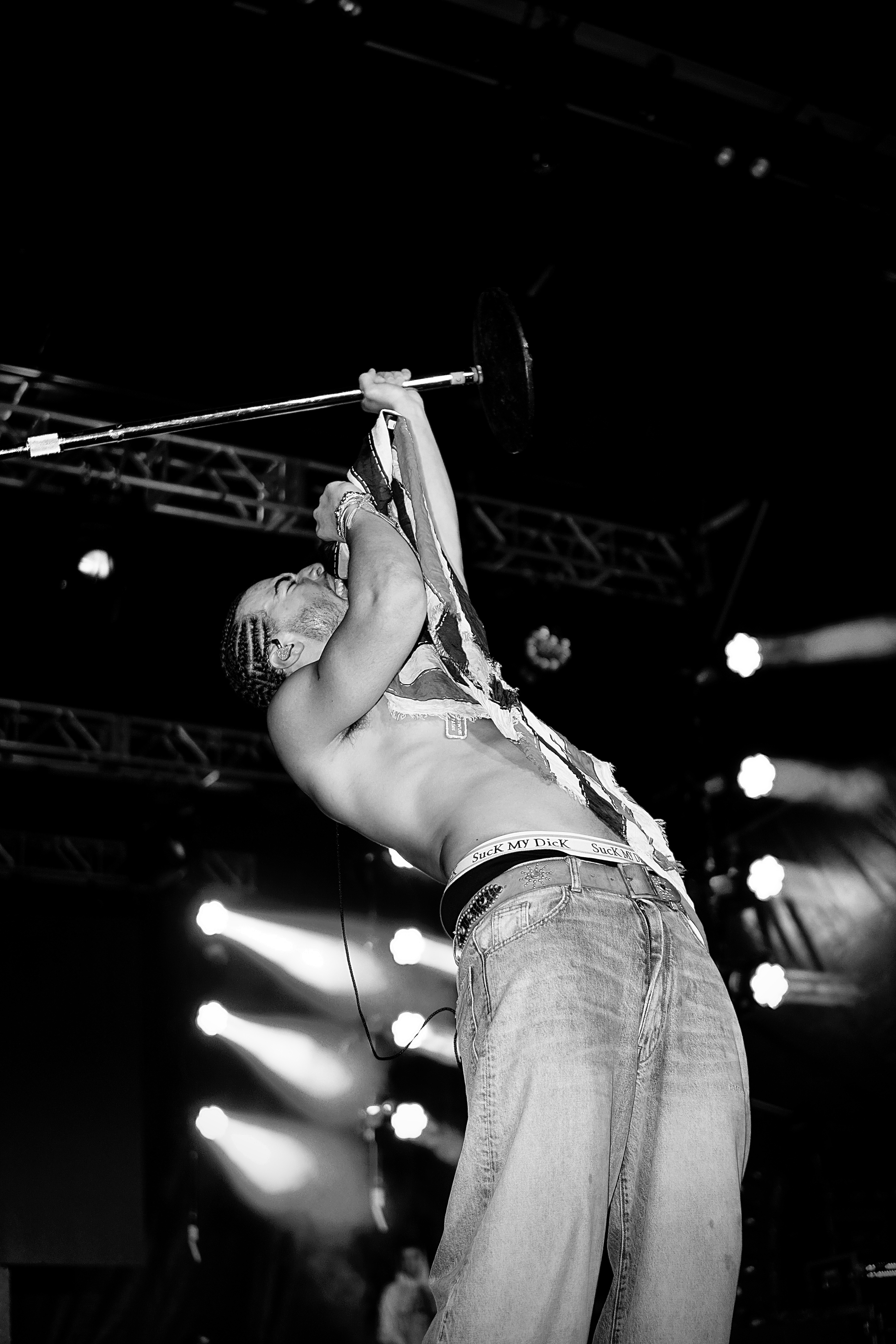
24kGoldn performing in 2023

On August 11, 2020, he was included on XXL's 2020 Freshman Class, placing in the tenth position after receiving the most fan votes. Later that same month, 24kGoldn's July 2020 single, titled "Mood" (featuring Iann Dior), hit the charts. It went on to peak at number one on the US Billboard Hot 100. In October 2020, these four episodes of Halloween in Hell, a fictionalised musical horror podcast that Jones starred in, were released. The series also starred Iann Dior, Machine Gun Kelly, Dana Dentata, Phem and Tommy Lee.

On March 26, 2021, he released his first studio album, titled El Dorado. The album features thirteen songs, with guest appearances from Future, Iann Dior, Swae Lee and DaBaby. Lil Tecca and Travis Barker appear on deluxe edition tracks.

On March 11, 2024, he announced an upcoming EP, Growing Pains, along with its cover artwork. It was released on March 15, 2024.

== Artistry ==
24kGoldn's music spans a variety of genres, motivated by his want "never ... to be constricted by one genre". Regarding his style, he stated: "depending on what song you listen to, my music can be described different ways". He attributes his "maturity and development" to rapper Paypa Boy & 24Kay, and Reckless Rinoe who initially got him into recording music.

== Discography ==
=== Studio albums ===
Title	Details	Peak chart positions						Certifications
Title	Details	US	AUS	CAN	IRE	NLD	NOR	Certifications
El Dorado	Released: March 26, 2021; Label: Records, Columbia; Format: Digital download, streaming	22	75	7	85	83	9	RIAA: Platinum; MC: Platinum

=== Extended plays ===
Title	Details	Peak chart positions	Certifications
Title	Details	US	Certifications
Dropped Outta College	Released: November 22, 2019; Label: Records, Columbia; Format: Digital download, streaming	122	RIAA: Gold
Growing Pains	Released: March 15, 2024; Label: Records, Columbia; Format: Digital download, streaming	133	
Icarus	Released: July 25, 2025; Label: Columbia; Format: Digital download, streaming	144	
Icarus 2	Released: November 14, 2025; Label: Columbia; Format: Digital download, streaming	155	
"—" denotes a recording that did not chart or was not released.

=== Singles ===
==== As lead artist ====
Title	Year	Peak chart positions										Certifications	Album
Title	Year	US	US Rock	AUS	CAN	GER	IRE	NLD	NZ	SWE	UK	Certifications	Album
"Ballin' Like Shareef"	2018	—	—	—	—	—	—	—	—	—	—		Non-album single
"Valentino"	2019	92	—	—	38	—	—	—	—	—	—	RIAA: 2× Platinum; BPI: Silver; MC: 4× Platinum; RMNZ: Platinum	Dropped Outta College
"Time for That"	2019	—	—	—	—	—	—	—	—	—	—		Non-album single
"A Lot to Lose"	2019	—	—	—	—	—	—	—	—	—	—		Dropped Outta College
"Games on Your Phone"	2019	—	—	—	—	—	—	—	—	—	—		Dropped Outta College
"Dropped Outta College"	2019	—	—	—	—	—	—	—	—	—	—		Dropped Outta College
"City of Angels"	2020	— (Note: "City of Angels" did not enter the Billboard Hot 100, but peaked at number three on the Bubbling Under Hot 100 chart.)	7	25	54	—	26	88	38	— (Note: "Too Much" did not enter the Swedish Singles Chart, but peaked at number 13 on the Swedish Heatseeker chart.)	25	RIAA: Platinum; ARIA: Platinum; BPI: Platinum; MC: 3× Platinum; RMNZ: Platinum	Dropped Outta College
"Unbelievable" (featuring Kaash Paige)	2020	—	—	—	—	—	—	—	—	—	—		Non-album singles
"Water Run Dry" (with Chelsea Collins)	2020	—	—	—	—	—	—	—	—	—	—		Non-album singles
"Mood" (featuring Iann Dior)	2020	1	1	1	1	1	1	1	1	1	1	RIAA: 7× Platinum; ARIA: 7× Platinum; BPI: 3× Platinum; BVMI: 2× Platinum; GLF: 4× Platinum; MC: Diamond; RMNZ: 6× Platinum	El Dorado
"Coco" (featuring DaBaby)	2020	—	—	—	78	—	83	—	— (Note: "Coco" did not enter the NZ Top 40 Singles Chart, but peaked at number nine on the NZ Hot Singles Chart.)	—	—	RIAA: Gold; MC: Platinum	El Dorado
"3, 2, 1"	2021	—	19	—	80	—	—	—	— (Note: "3, 2, 1" did not enter the NZ Top 40 Singles Chart, but peaked at number 20 on the NZ Hot Singles Chart.)	—	—	RIAA: Gold; MC: Platinum	El Dorado
"Love or Lust"	2021	—	36	—	—	—	—	—	— (Note: "Love or Lust" did not enter the NZ Top 40 Singles Chart, but peaked at number 33 on the NZ Hot Singles Chart.)	—	—		El Dorado
"Company" (featuring Future)	2021	—	—	—	—	—	—	—	— (Note: "Company" did not enter the NZ Top 40 Singles Chart, but peaked at number 37 on the NZ Hot Singles Chart.)	—	—	RIAA: Gold; MC: Gold	El Dorado
"I Won" (with Ty Dolla Sign and Jack Harlow)	2021	—	—	—	—	—	—	—	—	—	—		F9: The Fast Saga (Original Motion Picture Soundtrack)
"Alright" (with Hvme featuring Quavo)	2021	—	—	—	—	—	—	—	—	—	—		Non-album singles
"A-O-K" (Remix) (with Tai Verdes)	2021	—	—	57	—	—	—	—	—	—	—		Non-album singles
"Prada" (with Lil Tecca)	2021	—	—	—	71	—	—	—	— (Note: "Prada" did not enter the NZ Top 40 Singles Chart, but peaked at number 18 on the NZ Hot Singles Chart.)	—	—		El Dorado (Deluxe)
"More than Friends"	2021	—	—	—	—	—	—	—	— (Note: "More than Friends" did not enter the NZ Top 40 Singles Chart, but peaked at number 15 on the NZ Hot Singles Chart.)	—	—		El Dorado (Deluxe)
"Bella" (with Static & Ben El)	2022	—	—	—	—	—	—	—	—	—	—		Non-album singles
"Options" (with Internet Money)	2022	—	—	—	—	—	—	—	—	—	—		Non-album singles
"In My Head" (featuring Travis Barker)	2022	—	43	—	—	—	—	—	— (Note: "In My Head" did not enter the NZ Top 40 Singles Chart, but peaked at number 30 on the NZ Hot Singles Chart.)	—	—		El Dorado (Deluxe)
"Scar" (with Sokodomo)	2022	—	—	—	—	—	—	—	—	—	—		Non-album single
"Overthinking" (with Mabel)	2022	—	—	—	—	—	87	—	—	—	88		About Last Night...
"Oh My Lord" (with Arizona Zervas)	2022	—	—	—	—	—	—	—	—	—	—		Non-album single
"Mistakes"	2022	—	—	—	—	—	—	—	—	—	—		El Dorado (Deluxe)
"Checkers" (featuring Bandmanrill)	2022	—	—	—	—	—	—	—	—	—	—		Non-album singles
"Bite"	2023	—	—	—	—	—	—	—	—	—	—		Non-album singles
"My City" (with Kane Brown featuring G Herbo)	2023	—	—	—	—	—	—	—	—	—	—		Fast X (Original Motion Picture Soundtrack)
"Madness" (with Terrace Martin)	2023	—	—	—	—	—	—	—	—	—	—		Forever
"Good Intentions"	2024	—	—	—	—	—	—	—	—	—	—		Growing Pains
"Clarity"	2024	—	—	—	—	—	—	—	—	—	—		Growing Pains
"It's a Feeling" (with Sigala and Trevor Daniel)	2024	—	—	—	—	—	—	—	—	—	—		Non-album single
"June"	2025	—	—	—	—	—	—	—	—	—	—		Icarus
"—" denotes a recording that did not chart or was not released.

==== As featured artist ====
Title	Year	Peak chart positions										Certifications	Album
Title	Year	US Dance	AUS	CAN	GER	IRE	ITA	NLD	NZ Hot	SWE	UK	Certifications	Album
"2drunk" (MAJ featuring 24kGoldn)	2019	—	—	—	—	—	—	—	—	—	—		Majestic
"Love Dies" (12AM featuring 24kGoldn)	2019	—	—	—	—	—	—	—	—	—	—		Non-album singles
"Pretty" (Landon Cube featuring 24kGoldn)	2019	—	—	—	—	—	—	—	—	—	—		Non-album singles
"Sidelines" (Just Juice featuring 24kGoldn)	2019	—	—	—	—	—	—	—	—	—	—		Non-album singles
"Problems" (Remix) (DeathbyRomy featuring 24kGoldn)	2020	—	—	—	—	—	—	—	—	—	—		Non-album singles
"Earthquake" (KRYPTO9095 featuring 24kGoldn)	2020	—	—	—	—	—	—	—	—	—	—		Non-album singles
"Josslyn" (Olivia O'Brien featuring 24kGoldn)	2020	—	—	—	—	—	—	—	—	—	—	MC: Gold	Non-album singles
"Tinted Eyes" (Dvbbs featuring blackbear and 24kGoldn)	2020	23	—	62	—	—	—	—	—	—	—	MC: Platinum	Non-album singles
"Eighties" (Landon Cube featuring 24kGoldn)	2020	—	—	—	—	—	—	—	—	—	—		Non-album singles
"Belt" (Lil Dexx featuring 24kGoldn)	2020	—	—	—	—	—	—	—	—	—	—		Non-album singles
"Tick Tock" (Clean Bandit and Mabel featuring 24kGoldn)	2020	10	61	—	48	13	33	27	16	94	8	BPI: Platinum; FIMI: Platinum; RMNZ: Gold	TBA
"Cigarettes on Patios" (Remix) (BabyJake featuring 24kGoldn)	2020	—	—	—	—	—	—	—	—	—	—		Non-album singles
"I Admit It" (Zhu featuring 24kGoldn)	2020	23	—	—	—	—	—	—	—	—	—		Non-album singles
"Sorry!" (Tokyo's Revenge featuring 24kGoldn)	2020	—	—	—	—	—	—	—	—	—	—		Lilium
"Monsters" (Dynoro featuring 24kGoldn)	2021	37	—	—	—	—	—	—	—	—	—		Non-album single
"Talkin' About It" (Jihyo from Twice featuring 24KGoldn)	2023	—	—	—	—	—	—	—	—	—	—		Zone
"NaNaNa Tokyo" (Repezen Foxx featuring 24kGoldn)	2023	—	—	—	—	—	—	—	—	—	—		Non-album single
"WYA" (Leah Kate featuring 24kGoldn)	2024	—	—	—	—	—	—	—	—	—	—		TBA
"—" denotes a recording that did not chart or was not released.

==== Promotional singles ====
Title	Year	Album
"Ice Cream Man"	2018	Non-album singles
"Workin'"	2019	Non-album singles

=== Guest appearances ===
Title	Year	Other artist(s)	Album(s)
"Picture Perfect"	2019	Gabeo	Lock Up Lilies Bloom
"LIT"	2020	Lonr.	Land of Nothing Real
"Bayside"	2020	Skizzy Mars	Free Skizzy Mars
"Take It Slow"	2020	Internet Money, TyFontaine	B4 the Storm
"Giddy Up"	2020	Internet Money, Wiz Khalifa	B4 the Storm

=== Collaborative ===
Title	Album details
Audio Up presents Original Music from Halloween In Hell	Released: October 2020; Label: Audio Up; With: Machine Gun Kelly, Iann Dior, Phem, Dana Dentata, Tommy Lee

== Filmography ==
Year	Title	Role	Notes
2020	Halloween in Hell	Himself	Scripted podcast
2021	Home Economics	Himself	1 episode ("49ers Foam Fingers, $7")

== Tours ==
=== Headlining ===
- The El Dorado Tour (2021)
- The Growing Pains Tour (2024)

=== Supporting ===
- Logic & Wiz Khalifa – Vinyl Verse Summer Tour (2022)
