= Company (24kGoldn song) =

2021 single by 24kGoldn featuring Future

Single by 24kGoldn featuring Future

from the album El Dorado
- Released: April 27, 2021
- Genre: Pop; trap
- Length: 3:33
- Label: Records; Columbia
- Songwriters: Golden Von Jones; Nayvadius Wilburn; Nicholas Mira; Omer Fedi; Blake Slatkin
- Producers: Nick Mira; Fedi; Slatkin

24kGoldn singles chronology
"Love or Lust" (2021)	"Company" (2021)	"Monsters" (2021)

Future singles chronology
"Hard for the Next" / "Holdin Me Down" (2021)	"Company" (2021)	"Take Off" (2021)

Music video
- "Company" on YouTube

"Company" is a song by American rapper 24kGoldn featuring fellow American rapper Future. It was sent to rhythmic contemporary radio in the United States on April 27, 2021, as the fifth single from the former's debut studio album El Dorado (2021). The song was produced by Nick Mira, Omer Fedi and Blake Slatkin.

== Composition ==
The song contains a melodic, up-tempo guitar-driven instrumental with a trap bass. The lyrics center on the rappers' hedonistic lifestyles; 24kGoldn sings about the women who keep him company.

== Critical reception ==
Mitch Findlay of HotNewHipHop commented that Future "doesn't disappoint" in the song. Kyann-Sian Williams of NME wrote that 24kGoldn "holds his own" with Future on the song, even more so than on the song "Coco". Chris DeVille of Stereogum stated that "He finds a grittier mode on the hard-nosed 'Company' alongside Future".

== Music video ==
The music video was directed by Daps and released on May 26, 2021. It pays homage to the film Coming to America and its setting resembles the Joffer estate from the film, complete with golden accents and occupied by many beautiful women. It begins with 24kGoldn surrounded by a number of women in a room. He walks through the mansion before Future appears in a bathtub filled with gold jewelry, accompanied by two women and wearing diamonds on his wrist. In a recurring shot, the rappers perform their verses on a plush red couch while a party happens around them. Toward the end of the video, 24kGoldn and various women are shown covered in glow-in-the-dark neon body paint and dancing in a dark, empty void.

== Charts ==
Chart performance for "Company"
Chart (2021)	Peak position
New Zealand Hot Singles (RMNZ)	37

== Certifications ==
Certifications for "Company"
Region	Certification	Certified units/sales
Canada (Music Canada)	Gold	40,000^{‡}
United States (RIAA)	Gold	500,000^{‡}
^{‡} Sales+streaming figures based on certification alone.
