= City of Angels (24kGoldn song) =

2020 single by 24kGoldn

Single by 24kGoldn

from the EP Dropped Outta College
- Released: March 31, 2020
- Genre: Pop-punk
- Length: 1:54
- Label: Columbia
- Songwriters: Golden Landis Von Jones; Nicco Catalano; Omer Fedi

24kGoldn singles chronology
"Dropped Outta College" (2019)	"City of Angels" (2020)	"Unbelievable" (2020)

Music video
- "City of Angels" on YouTube

"City of Angels" is a song by American rapper 24kGoldn. It was released as a single on March 31, 2020, peaking at number 25 on the UK Singles Chart and number 3 on the US Billboard Bubbling Under Hot 100.

== Background ==
The song's title refers the nickname of Los Angeles, City of Angels; Goldn explains during the chorus "the city of angels is where I have my fun".

== Music video ==
The video was directed by Nicholas Jandora and filmed in Los Angeles. Clear skies and swaying palm trees cut to roaring protestors on the picket line, and Goldn strides past them in a red suit, braids flying, to slide into a car with a couple of angels in the form of leggy women in feathery attire. Things go awry, a quick escape results in a car crash and he ends up in heaven.

== Remix ==
On May 19, 2020, English singer Yungblud shared a remix version of "City of Angels".

== Charts ==
=== Weekly charts ===
Chart (2020)	Peak position
Australia (ARIA)	25
Belgium (Ultratip Bubbling Under Flanders)	9
Canada Hot 100 (Billboard)	54
Czech Republic Singles Digital (ČNS IFPI)	72
Hungary (Stream Top 40)	40
Ireland (IRMA)	26
Netherlands (Single Top 100)	88
New Zealand (Recorded Music NZ)	38
Portugal (AFP)	135
Scottish Singles Sales (Official Charts)	47
Sweden Heatseeker (Sverigetopplistan)	13
UK Singles (Official Charts)	25
US Bubbling Under Hot 100 (Billboard)	3
US Rock & Alternative Airplay (Billboard)	25
US Hot Rock & Alternative Songs (Billboard)	7

=== Year-end charts ===
Chart (2020)	Position
US Hot Rock & Alternative Songs (Billboard)	26

== Certifications ==
Region	Certification	Certified units/sales
Australia (ARIA)	Platinum	70,000^{‡}
Canada (Music Canada)	3× Platinum	240,000^{‡}
Denmark (IFPI Danmark)	Gold	45,000^{‡}
Hungary (MAHASZ)	Platinum	4,000^{‡}
Mexico (AMPROFON)	Gold	30,000^{‡}
New Zealand (RMNZ)	Platinum	30,000^{‡}
Portugal (AFP)	Gold	5,000^{‡}
United Kingdom (BPI)	Platinum	600,000^{‡}
United States (RIAA)	Platinum	1,000,000^{‡}
^{‡} Sales+streaming figures based on certification alone.

== Release history ==
Region	Date	Format	Label	Ref.
United States	March 31, 2020	Alternative radio	Columbia	
