= A-O-K (song) =

2021 single by Tai Verdes

Single by Tai Verdes

from the album TV
- Released: June 8, 2021
- Genre: Roots rock; pop
- Length: 2:53; 3:01 (remix); 3:13 (Manuel Turizo remix)
- Label: Arista
- Songwriters: Adam Friedman; Brian William Brundage; Martijn Tienus Konijnenburg; Tyler Colon
- Producer: Adam Friedman

Tai Verdes singles chronology
"We Would Have Some Cute Kids." (2021)	"A-O-K" (2021)	"Feeling This Bad (v2)" (2021)

24kGoldn singles chronology
"Alright" (2021)	"A-O-K (Remix)" (2021)	"Prada" (2021)

Music videos
- "A-O-K" on YouTube; "A-O-K" (Remix) on YouTube

"A-O-K" is a song by American singer Tai Verdes. It was released on June 8, 2021, as the fifth single from his debut studio album TV via Arista Records. The song was written by Adam Friedman, Brian William Brundage, Martijn Tienus Konijnenburg and Tai Verdes, and produced by Friedman. A remix featuring guest vocals from fellow American rapper 24kGoldn was released on September 10, 2021. Additionally, an alternative version featuring latin artist Manuel Turizo was released on November 18, 2021.

The song is also the walk-up song for Philadelphia Phillies second baseman Bryson Stott aside from a period in 2026, making it particularly popular throughout the Philadelphia metropolitan area.

== Background ==
In a press release, Verdes explained "'A-O-K' is just a song for anyone who wants to feel 2% better. I made it to help myself, and I hope that it's helping other people when they listen to it." He also expressed to The Music Network that the song "provide[s] an uplifting message for listeners throughout the COVID-19 pandemic."

== Music video ==
The song received two music video releases. The original version was released on May 19, 2021. The remix version with 24kGoldn was released on September 14, 2021, and directed by Logan Meis. In a backyard party, 24kGoldn and Verdes showcase their "eclectic styles and mischievous sense of humour reign free in a laid-back Sunday style". It includes "lemonade stands, pugs and flamingos."

== Charts ==
=== Weekly charts ===
Weekly chart performance for "A-O-K"
Chart (2021)	Peak position
Australia (ARIA)	24
Canada (Canadian Hot 100)	20
Global 200 (Billboard)	86
Ireland (IRMA)	59
New Zealand (Recorded Music NZ)	26
Sweden Heatseeker (Sverigetopplistan)	2
UK Singles (Official Charts)	92
US Billboard Hot 100	34
US Adult Top 40 (Billboard)	21
US Hot Rock & Alternative Songs (Billboard)	4
US Mainstream Top 40 (Billboard)	12
US Rock & Alternative Airplay (Billboard)	21

=== Year-end charts ===
Year-end chart performance for "A-O-K"
Chart (2021)	Position
Canada (Canadian Hot 100)	65
US Hot Rock & Alternative Songs (Billboard)	10
US Mainstream Top 40 (Billboard)	48

== Certifications ==
Certifications for "A-O-K"
Region	Certification	Certified units/sales
Australia (ARIA)	Platinum	70,000^{‡}
Canada (Music Canada)	4× Platinum	320,000^{‡}
New Zealand (RMNZ)	2× Platinum	60,000^{‡}
United Kingdom (BPI)	Silver	200,000^{‡}
United States (RIAA)	3× Platinum	3,000,000^{‡}
^{‡} Sales+streaming figures based on certification alone.

== Release history ==
Release history for "A-O-K"
Region	Date	Format	Version	Label	Ref.
Various	May 20, 2021	Digital download; streaming	Original	Arista	
United States	June 8, 2021	Contemporary hit radio	Original	Arista	
Various	September 10, 2021	Digital download; streaming	24kGoldn remix	Arista	
Various	November 18, 2021	Digital download; streaming	Manuel Turizo remix	Arista	
