= Prada (24kGoldn and Lil Tecca song) =

2021 single by 24kGoldn and Lil Tecca

Single by 24kGoldn and Lil Tecca

from the album El Dorado (Deluxe)
- Released: October 8, 2021
- Length: 2:31
- Label: Records; Columbia
- Songwriters: Golden Von Jones; Tyler-Justin Sharpe; Cody Rounds; Tobias Fagerström; Niccolo Short; Danny Snodgrass Jr.
- Producers: Cxdy; Humblebee; OVRCZ; Taz Taylor

24kGoldn singles chronology
"Spaceship" (2021)	"Prada" (2021)	"Big Swag" (2021)

Lil Tecca singles chronology
"Come Through" (2021)	"Prada" (2021)	"Fallin" (2022)

Music video
- "Prada" on YouTube

"Prada" is a single by American rappers 24kGoldn and Lil Tecca, released on October 8, 2021. It was produced by Cxdy, Humblebee, OVRCZ and Taz Taylor.

== Background ==
The artists first performed the song at the Governors Ball Music Festival in September 2021, prior to releasing it on October 8. In an interview with Hypebeast, 24kGoldn spoke about the collaboration process:

It was very natural, he was working on We Love You Tecca 2 with Internet Money and Taz, they told me pull up come catch a vibe. We ended up banging out two of them, and this is the one I fuck with the most, so I decided to put it out. Tecca had a great verse, he bodied his verse, I did my thing on there like always, and I think it came together really really nice.

== Composition ==
24kGoldn explained the meaning behind the song in the aforementioned interview:

At first glance, it's safe to assume it's about Prada, but really the underlying message is about confidence, growth, and change. They not gonna fuck with you when you down, but they gonna fuck with you when you up, and how I dealt with that, how Tecca dealt with that.

The song mentions getting "guala" and spending it. In the chorus, 24kGoldn sings "Prada, that's on my shoes, that's on my shirt, that's on my collar / I hit it once, ain't hit her back 'cause I'm a baller".

== Music video ==
The music video was directed by John Tashiro and released alongside the single. It takes place in a shopping mall. Dressed exclusively in Prada, the artists are seen pulling stunts, such as leading a group of teenagers on a quad bike, and being chased by the mall's security.

== Charts ==
Chart performance for "Prada"
Chart (2021)	Peak position
Canada Hot 100 (Billboard)	71
New Zealand Hot Singles (RMNZ)	18
