= Tai Verdes =

American singer (born 1995)

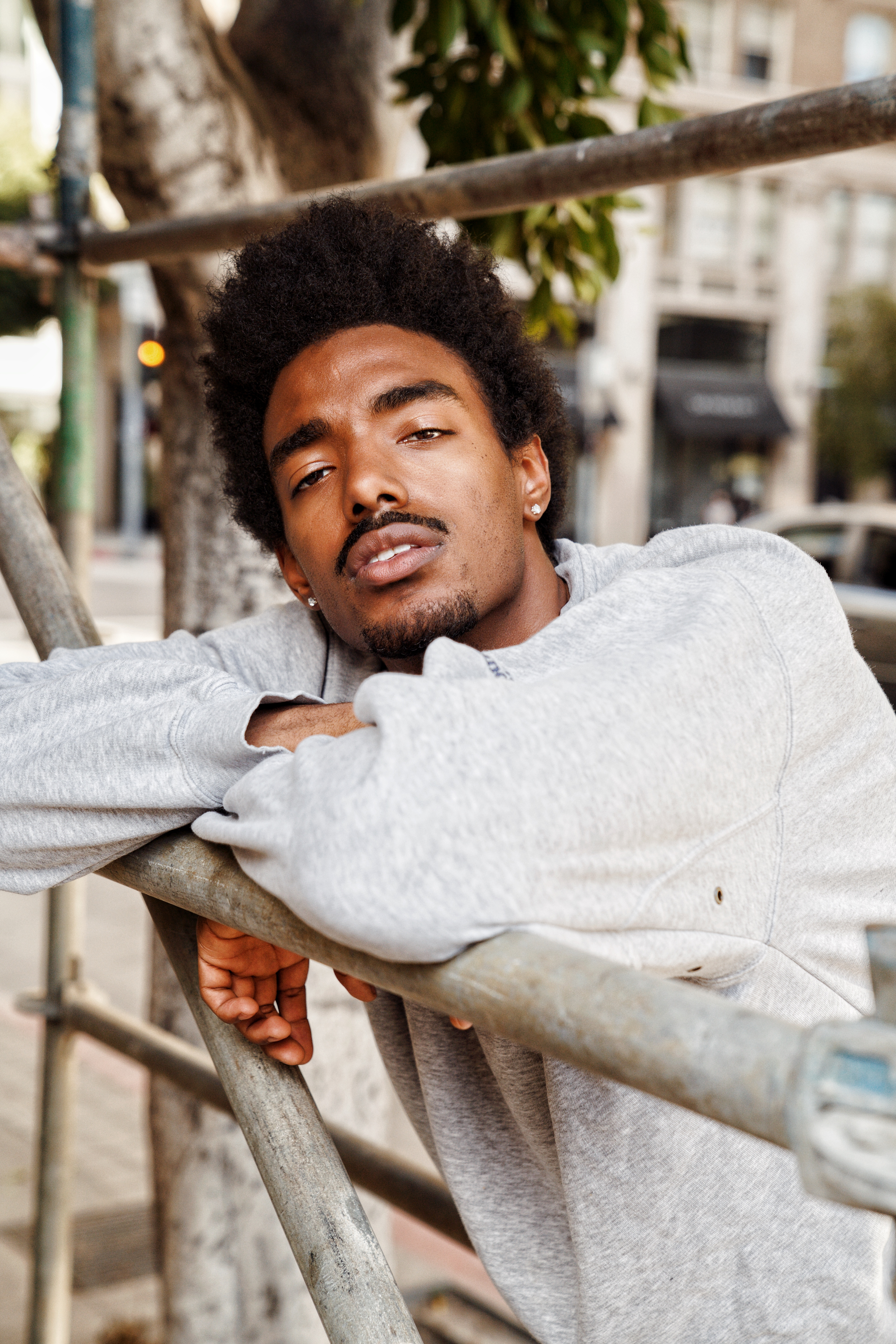
- Verdes in 2020

Background information
- Also known as: Tylersemicolon
- Born: Tyler James Colon; December 6, 1995 (age 30); Los Angeles, California, U.S.
- Genres: Pop
- Occupations: Singer; songwriter; record producer
- Instruments: Vocals; guitar; ukulele
- Years active: 2020–present
- Website: taiverdes.com

Tyler James Colon (born December 6, 1995), known professionally as Tai Verdes, is an American singer. He grew up in Southern California where he played guitar, piano, and ukulele. Playing on the basketball team during his attendance at Babson College, he maintained his love for music and eventually dropped out. He was also featured on and won season 6 of Are You the One?. He worked at a phone store during the COVID-19 pandemic, but this still helped further his musical passion and during the same time, he released his breakout single "Stuck in the Middle" in June 2020. The song went viral on TikTok. He responded to his newfound success saying the song "doesn't just turn into a million dollars and a nice car. It turns into waiting-which I think I've gotten pretty good at."

In May 2021, he released his debut full-length studio album, TV. The album featured the single "A-O-K", which peaked at No. 34 on the Billboard Hot 100 and achieved 24.7 million radio plays.

== Career ==
Verdes released his first single, "Stuck in the Middle," in mid-2020, which garnered millions of views across various streaming platforms. At the time, he was living on a friend’s couch and working at a Verizon phone service store. Prior to this, he auditioned for shows like The Voice and American Idol without success. However, he won an MTV dating series when he starred on season 6 of Are You the One?.

"Stuck in the Middle" went viral on TikTok, and this success extended to other singles like "Sheesh!" and "Drugs."

In January 2022, Verdes signed a global publishing deal with Kobalt Music Group, citing "artist-friendly" contract terms. He had previously signed with Arista Records, a record label owned by Sony Music.

On September 16, 2022, Verdes released his second studio album HDTV.

== Discography ==
=== Studio albums ===
List of studio albums, with selected details and chart positions
Title	Album details	Peak chart positions		Certifications
Title	Album details	US	CAN	Certifications
TV	Released: May 20, 2021; Label: Fourth Wall, Last Nite, Arista; Formats: Digital download, streaming	168	62	RIAA: Gold; MC: Gold
HDTV	Released: September 16, 2022; Label: Fourth Wall, Last Nite, Arista; Formats: CD, Digital download, streaming	—	—	

=== Singles ===
List of singles as lead artist, with year released, selected chart positions, and album name shown
Title	Year	Peak chart positions								Certifications	Album
Title	Year	US	US Rock	AUS	CAN	IRE	NZ	SWE Heat.	UK	Certifications	Album
"Stuck in the Middle" (original or "Pt. II" version featuring Kiana Ledé)	2020	—	—	—	—	—	—	—	—	RIAA: Gold; MC: Platinum; RMNZ: Gold	TV
"Drugs"	2020	—	—	—	—	—	—	—	—	RIAA: Gold; MC: Platinum	TV
"Bad Bad News"	2021	—	—	—	—	—	—	—	—		TV
"We Would Have Some Cute Kids."	2021	—	—	—	—	—	—	—	—		TV
"A-O-K" (original or remix with 24kGoldn)	2021	34	4	24	20	59	26	2	92	RIAA: 3× Platinum; ARIA: Platinum; BPI: Silver; MC: 4× Platinum; RMNZ: 2× Platinum	TV
"Feeling This Bad (v2)"	2021	—	—	—	—	—	—	—	—		Non-album single
"Sheesh!" (with Surfaces)	2021	—	—	—	—	—	— (Note: "Sheesh!" did not enter the NZ Top 40 Singles Chart, but peaked at number 30 on the NZ Hot Singles Chart.)	—	—	RIAA: Gold	Pacifico (Deluxe)
"Let's Go to Hell"	2021	—	—	—	—	—	—	—	—		HDTV
"Last Day on Earth"	2022	—	—	—	—	—	— (Note: "Last Day on Earth" did not enter the NZ Top 40 Singles Chart, but peaked at number 22 on the NZ Hot Singles Chart.)	—	—		HDTV
"3 Outfits"	2022	—	—	—	—	—	—	—	—		HDTV
"100sadsongs"	2022	—	—	—	—	—	—	—	—		HDTV
"Sheluvme"	2022	—	—	—	—	—	—	—	—		HDTV
"How Deep"	2022	—	—	—	—	—	—	—	—		HDTV
"Sandman"	2023	—	—	—	—	—	—	—	—		TBA
"All White"	2023	—	—	—	—	—	—	—	—		TBA
"Sunset"	2023	—	—	—	—	—	—	—	—		TBA
"Stars"	2023	—	—	—	—	—	—	—	—		TBA
"Pipe Down"	2024	—	—	—	—	—	—	—	—		TBA
"—" denotes a recording that did not chart or was not released in that territory.

== Notes ==
He’s no longer signed to ARISTA as he was delisted from the label website in June 2026
