= El Dorado (24kGoldn album) =

Studio album by 24kGoldn
- Released: March 26, 2021
- Genres: Pop; alternative rock; hip-hop
- Length: 36:49
- Labels: Records; Columbia
- Producers: 94Skrt; Blake Slatkin; Carter Lang; Haan; Ilya; Internet Money; JaeGreen; Jasper Harris; KBeaZy; Louis Bell; Neek; Nick Mira; Omer Fedi; Westen Weiss

24kGoldn chronology
Dropped Outta College (2019)	El Dorado (2021)	Growing Pains (2024)

Singles from El Dorado
- 1. "Mood" Released: July 24, 2020; 2. "Coco" Released: December 4, 2020; 3. "3, 2, 1" Released: February 19, 2021; 4. "Love or Lust" Released: April 23, 2021; 5. "Company" Released: April 27, 2021

El Dorado is the debut studio album by American rapper and singer-songwriter 24kGoldn. It was released on March 26, 2021, by Records and distributed by Columbia Records. It follows his debut extended play, Dropped Outta College, which was released in late 2019. The album features guest appearances from DaBaby, Future, Swae Lee, and Iann Dior. The album was certified Platinum by the RIAA in the United States in January 2024 for selling one million units in the country.

== Background ==
The album's title was confirmed by the singer in September 2020, while the album's lead single "Mood" reached its peak success. On March 15, 2021, he revealed the album's tracklist in a video. Four days later, he announced the album's release date along with revealing the cover art. That same day, he also teased a deluxe edition of the album by responding to a fan's comment on TikTok. He toured in support of the album; the El Dorado Tour began on November 2, 2021, and ended on January 27, 2022.

A digital deluxe edition with five additional tracks was released on September 30, 2022. This issue of the album includes the remix of "Mood", featuring Justin Bieber and J Balvin. Additionally, it features collaborations performed by Lil Tecca and Travis Barker.

== Singles ==
The album was preceded by three singles. The lead single, "Mood", featuring Puerto Rican rapper Iann Dior, was released on July 24, 2020, and would go on to achieve success on several charts worldwide. In September 2020, while the song was in the top 10 in both the United States and United Kingdom, 24kGoldn announced that an album would follow the single. The second single, "Coco", featuring American rapper DaBaby, was released on December 4, 2020. The third single, "3, 2, 1", was released on February 19, 2021.

Following the release of the album, "Love or Lust" was sent to contemporary hit radio in Italy on April 23, 2021, as the album's fourth single. The following week, "Company", featuring American rapper Future, was sent to rhythmic contemporary radio in the United States on April 27, 2021, as the album's fifth single.

Four new singles dropped in late 2021 and early 2022, prior to the album's deluxe reissue on September 30, 2022.

== Critical reception ==
Professional ratings
Review scores
Source	Rating
AllMusic	3.5/5 stars
NME	4/5 stars
Rolling Stone	3/5 stars

Nick Catucci of Rolling Stone described 24kGoldn and his emotion as "sunny as he can be sad", comparing his sounds to Chance the Rapper on "The Top" and Post Malone on "3, 2, 1" and "Empty", the latter of which features American rapper and singer Swae Lee.

== Track listing ==
El Dorado track listing
No.	Title	Writer(s)	Producer(s)	Length
1.	"The Top"	Golden Landis Von Jones; Jasper Harris; Keegan Bach; Subhaan Rahman	Harris; KBeazy; Haan	3:16
2.	"Company" (featuring Future)	Landis Von Jones; Nayvadius Wilburn; Nicholas Mira; Omer Fedi; Blake Slatkin	Nick Mira; Fedi; Slatkin	3:33
3.	"Love or Lust"	Landis Von Jones; Billy Walsh; Louis Bell; Fedi	Bell; Fedi	2:56
4.	"Outta Pocket"	Landis Von Jones; Mira; Fedi; Slatkin; Nicco Catalano	Mira; Fedi; Slatkin; Neek	2:27
5.	"Coco" (featuring DaBaby)	Landis Von Jones; Jonathan Kirk; Fedi; Jace Jennings	94Skrt; Fedi	2:22
6.	"Butterflies"	Landis Von Jones; D'Kyla Woolen; Fedi; Bach; Slatkin; Westen Weiss	Fedi; KBeazy; Slatkin; Weiss	3:40
7.	"Breath Away"	Landis Von Jones; Walsh; Carter Lang; Fedi; Bach; Slatkin; Carter Lang	Lang; Fedi; KBeazy; Slatkin	2:51
8.	"Yellow Lights"	Landis Von Jones; Fedi; Slatkin; Jennings; Jacob Greenspan	94Skrt; Fedi; Slatkin; JaeGreen	2:26
9.	"3, 2, 1"	Landis Von Jones; Tatiauna Matthews; Donald Andrews; Mira; Kim Candilora II; Rio Leyva; Fedi; Slatkin	Internet Money; Fedi; Slatkin	2:12
10.	"Empty" (featuring Swae Lee)	Landis Von Jones; Khalif Brown; Mira; Fedi; Bach; Slatkin	Mira; Fedi; KBeazy; Slatkin	2:43
11.	"Cut It Off"	Landis Von Jones; Fedi; Slatkin; Catalano	Fedi; Slatkin; Neek	2:35
12.	"Don't Sleep"	Landis Von Jones; Rami Yacoub; Walsh; Ilya Salmanzadeh; Fedi	Ilya; Fedi	3:27
13.	"Mood" (featuring Iann Dior)	Landis Von Jones; Michael Olmo; Bach; Fedi; Slatkin	KBeazy; Fedi; Slatkin	2:21
Total length:				36:49

Digital deluxe edition track listing
No.	Title	Writer(s)	Producer(s)	Length
14.	"Mood" (Remix) (featuring Justin Bieber, J Balvin, and Iann Dior)	Landis Von Jones; Olmo; Bach; Fedi; Slatkin; Bieber; José Balvin	KBeazy; Fedi; Slatkin	3:12
15.	"Prada" (with Lil Tecca)	Landis Von Jones; Tyler-Justin Sharpe; Cody Rounds; Tobias Fagerstrom; Niccolo Short; Danny Snodgrass Jr.	Internet Money; Cxdy; Humblebee; OVRCZ	2:31
16.	"More Than Friends"	Marcel Hall; Manny Marroquin; Philip Lawrence; Davy Nathan; Landis Von Jones	Elephant Castle	2:54
17.	"In My Head" (with Travis Barker)	Landis Von Jones; Barker; Einer Bankz	Barker; Bankz	2:10
18.	"Mistakes"	Landis Von Jones; Catalono; Nathan Mayne; Tristan Securro	Neek; RMBeatz; Tico Beats	2:29
Total length:				50:05

== Personnel ==
Musicians

- Omer Fedi – guitar (2–10, 12, 13), bass (3, 4, 8, 9, 13), keyboards (6, 11, 12), programming (13)
- Jace Jennings – drums (5)
- Kaash Paige – background vocals (6)
- Nick Mira – drums (9)
- Blake Slatkin – guitar (9, 13), bass (13), programming (13)

Technical

- Golden Landis Von Jones – executive producer
- Omer Fedi – executive producer
- Dale Becker – mastering engineer (1–12)
- Chris Gehringer – mastering engineer (13)
- Manny Marroquin – mixing engineer (1–11, 13)
- Robin Florent – mixing engineer (1–11, 13)
- Serban Ghenea – mixing engineer (12)
- John Hanes – mixing engineer (12)
- Hector Vega – engineer (1–12)
- Fili Filizzola – engineer (1–12)
- Connor Hedge – engineer (1–12)
- Blake Slatkin – engineer (13), recording engineer (2, 4–7, 10, 11)
- Ryan Adam Cantu – engineer, recording engineer (13)
- Donn Robb – recording engineer (1)
- Louis Bell – recording engineer (3)
- Jace Jennings – recording engineer (8)
- Ilya Salmanzadeh – recording engineer (12)
- Jeremie Inhaber – assistant engineer (1–11, 13)
- Chris Galland – assistant engineer (1–11, 13)

== Charts ==
=== Weekly charts ===
Weekly chart performance for El Dorado
Chart (2021)	Peak position
Australian Albums (ARIA)	75
Belgian Albums (Ultratop Flanders)	124
Canadian Albums (Billboard)	7
Danish Albums (Hitlisten)	28
Dutch Albums (Album Top 100)	44
Finnish Albums (Suomen virallinen lista)	31
French Albums (SNEP)	127
Irish Albums (IRMA)	85
Italian Albums (FIMI)	77
Lithuanian Albums (AGATA)	10
Norwegian Albums (VG-lista)	9
Swedish Albums (Sverigetopplistan)	43
US Billboard 200	22
US Top Alternative Albums (Billboard)	3
US Top Rap Albums (Billboard)	1

=== Year-end charts ===
Year-end chart performance for El Dorado
Chart (2021)	Position
US Top Alternative Albums (Billboard)	25

== Certifications ==
Certifications for El Dorado
Region	Certification	Certified units/sales
Canada (Music Canada)	Platinum	80,000^{‡}
Denmark (IFPI Danmark)	Gold	10,000^{‡}
Hungary (MAHASZ)	Gold	2,000^{‡}
New Zealand (RMNZ)	Gold	7,500^{‡}
Poland (ZPAV)	Gold	10,000^{‡}
Switzerland (IFPI Switzerland)	Gold	10,000^{‡}
United States (RIAA)	Platinum	1,000,000^{‡}
^{‡} Sales+streaming figures based on certification alone.
