= Love or Lust (song) =

2021 single by 24kGoldn

Single by 24kGoldn

from the album El Dorado
- Released: April 23, 2021
- Genre: Pop; funk; house; R&B; power pop
- Length: 2:56
- Label: Records; Columbia
- Songwriters: Golden Von Jones; Billy Walsh; Louis Bell; Omer Fedi
- Producers: Bell; Fedi

24kGoldn singles chronology
"3, 2, 1" (2021)	"Love or Lust" (2021)	"Company" (2021)

"Love or Lust" is a song by American singer 24kGoldn from his debut studio album El Dorado (2021). It was sent to Italian contemporary hit radio on April 23, 2021, as the album's fourth single. The song was produced by Louis Bell and Omer Fedi.

== Critical reception ==
The song received generally positive reviews from music critics. Fred Thomas of AllMusic commented the song "approaches Maroon 5 levels of pop, rooted by 24kGoldn's infectious flows." In a review of El Dorado, Chris DeVille of Stereogum stated, "The bass-driven 'Love Or Lust' and the reggae-tinged 'Breath Away' are like Gym Class Heroes trying to write Police songs; upon exposure you pray they don't end up stuck in your head. Those are works of genius compared to 'Coco'". Alexander Cole of HotNewHipHop praised the song, saying "the song has a kind of Bruno Mars feel to it. From the bass lines to the strings, the beat is incredibly groovy and 24kGoldn makes use of the production by bringing in some solid songwriting and catchy flows. It's yet another solid effort from the young hitmaker, and it will surely make a few playlists."

== Commercial performance ==
Following the release of the album, the song debuted at number 36 on the US Hot Rock and Alternative Songs chart, becoming the third highest-charting song off the album on the chart, only behind his breakthrough hit "Mood", and "3, 2, 1".

== Charts ==
Chart performance for "Love or Lust"
Chart (2021)	Peak position
New Zealand Hot Singles (RMNZ)	33
US Hot Rock & Alternative Songs (Billboard)	36
