= List of Tau Kappa Epsilon chapters =

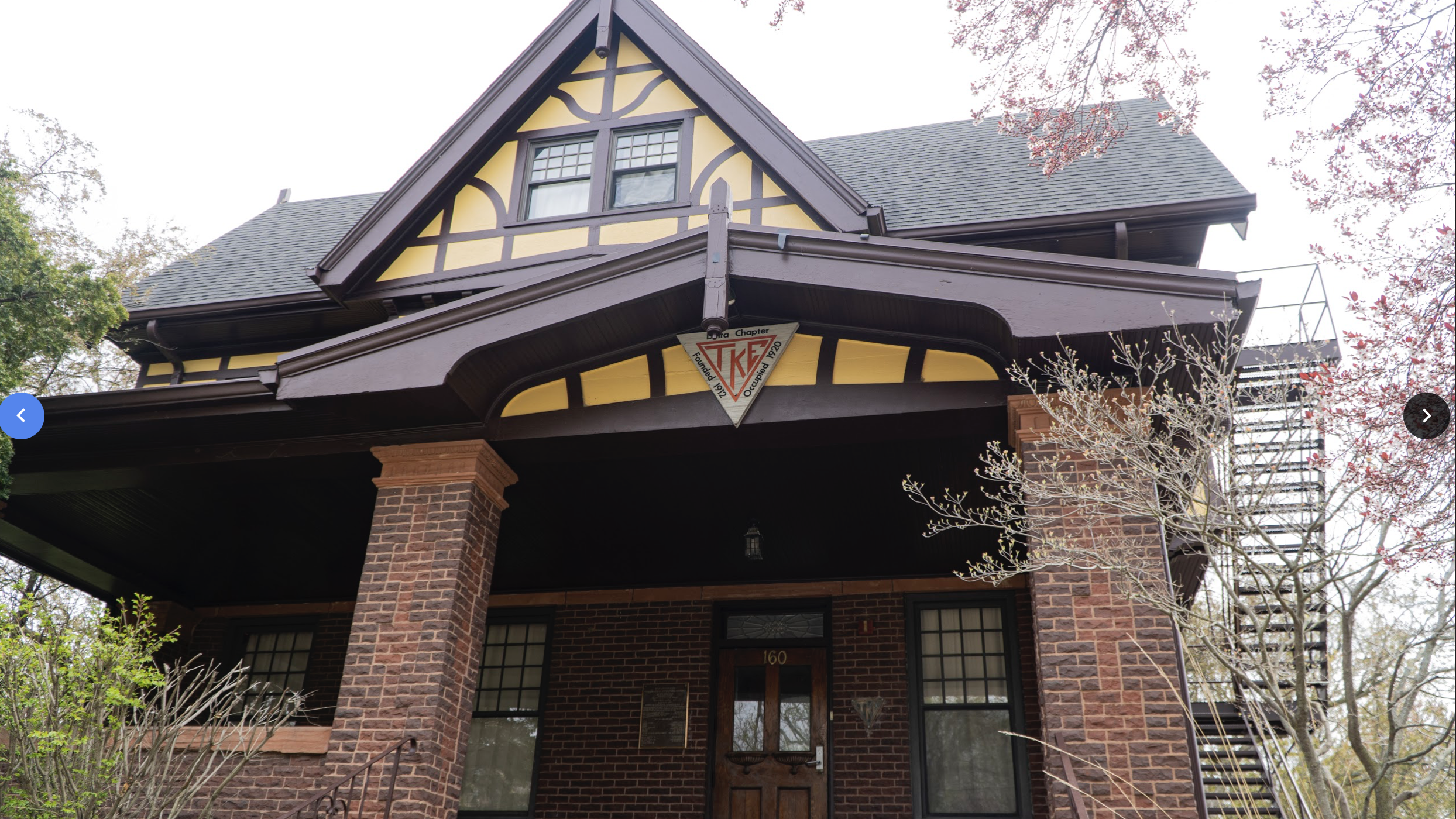
Knox College Delta chapter house, the oldest ΤΚΕ chapter house

Tau Kappa Epsilon is a social college fraternity founded on January 10, 1899, at Illinois Wesleyan University. Its chapters and colonies are individual organizations of initiated members of Tau Kappa Epsilon associated with a university or college. After the first, or single-letter Alpha series, chapters are named with a two-letter Greek letter combination in alphabetical order of the Greek alphabet, such as Alpha-Alpha, Beta-Alpha, etc. The Greek letter Eta was skipped over as a named series. Naming occurs according to the date when the chapter's charter was granted. In one exception to this general rule, the group that would have been the Sigma chapter received special permission to be referred to as the Scorpion chapter, honoring the name of a long-standing local affiliate into the fraternity.

A colony is defined as unit of the fraternity awaiting its official charter by the Grand Council, which is the fraternity's board of directors. Once a colony has obtained at least twenty qualified members and has petitioned for a charter, the Grand Council may grant a charter by a two-thirds vote. As of 2022, colonies are officially referred to as "emerging chapters" by the fraternity.

Chapters may have become inactive after being granted a charter, due to membership decline, misconduct, or school closure. In some cases, the Fraternity and alumni volunteers may restore a dormant chapter using the same chapter name. Numerous chapters that were once closed have been reorganized and have successfully reestablished themselves in their school and community.

== Chapters ==
The following is a list of Tau Kappa Epsilon chapters in order of their chapter number, with active chapters indicated in bold and inactive chapters and institutions in italics.

#	Chapter	Charter date and range	Institution	Location	Status	Ref.
001	**Alpha**	January 10, 1899 – c. 1941; c. 1944	Illinois Wesleyan University	Bloomington, Illinois	Active	(Note: Chapter formed from the Knights of Classic Lore (local), established on January 10, 1899. It ceased operations during World War II for three years but did not lose its charter. In 1998, the Alpha chapter briefly lost University recognition due to violations of the school's alcohol policy.)
002	**Beta**	April 17, 1908 – c. 1941; February 1946	Millikin University	Decatur, Illinois	Active	(Note: Chapter originated as Chi Rho Sigma (local). It closed during World War II but did not lose its charter.)
003	Gamma	February 3, 1912 – 1987 ?; 1998–2015	University of Illinois at Urbana–Champaign	Champaign, Illinois	Inactive	(Note: Chapter originated as the Campus Club (local) in 1911. Later, it would absorb the campus chapters of Sigma Mu Sigma and Sigma Phi Sigma.)
004	**Delta**	November 22, 1912	Knox College	Galesburg, Illinois	Active	
005	**Epsilon**	May 28, 1915	Iowa State University	Ames, Iowa	Active	(Note: Chapter originated as the Seminoles (local) in 1911.)
006	**Zeta**	May 12, 1916	Coe College	Cedar Rapids, Iowa	Active	(Note: Chapter originated as Chi Theta Psi (local) in 1915.)
007	Eta	February 17, 1917 – 1932	University of Chicago	Chicago, Illinois	Inactive	(Note: Chapter originated as Eta Tau Epsilon (local) in 1916. It went inactive during the Great Depression.)
008	**Theta**	March 10, 1917 – 1942; 1948–1963; 1980–1987; 2014	University of Minnesota	Minneapolis, Minnesota	Active	(Note: Chapter originated as Eta Sigma Rho (local) in 1916.)
009	**Iota**	April 21, 1917	Eureka College	Eureka, Illinois	Active	(Note: Chapter originated as Pi Alpha Theta (local) in 1906, the first fraternity at Eureka College.)
010	**Kappa**	1984	Beloit College	Beloit, Wisconsin	Active	(Note: Chapter originated as Delta Phi Upsilon (local) in 1908.)
011	**Lambda**	December 15, 1917 – 1933; 1947–1971; 1974–19xx ?; 1992	University of Wisconsin–Madison	Madison, Wisconsin	Active	(Note: Chapter originated as the Akela Club (local) in 1916.)
012	Mu	September 19, 1919 – 1994	Carroll University	Waukesha, Wisconsin	Inactive	(Note: Chapter originated as Sigma Alpha Phi (local) in 1910.)
013	**Nu**	October 3, 1919 – 1933; 1947–1994; 2004	University of California, Berkeley	Berkeley, California	Active	(Note: Chapter originated as the Sequoyah Club (local) in 1913.)
014	**Xi**	September 17, 1920	Washington University in St. Louis	St. Louis County, Missouri	Active	(Note: Chapter originated as Phi Omega (local) in 1919.)
015	**Omicron**	May 27, 1921 – April 2001; April 2002 – January 2018; January 25, 2026	Ohio State University	Columbus, Ohio	Active	(Note: Chapter originated as Beta Alpha Chi (local) in 1914. The university suspended the chapter for one year in April 2001. In January 2018, the university suspended the chapter for three years. Its return was approved by the university in the spring of 2021.)
016	**Pi**		Pennsylvania State University	State College and College Township, Pennsylvania	Active	(Note: Chapter originated as Tau Sigma Tau (local) in 1920. It announced in June 2017 that it would close its house for the 2017–2018 school year for "a year of reconsideration and recharge of the values, traditions, and mission of Pi Chapter ΤΚΕ" in the wake of the death of Tim Piazza.)
017	**Rho**	January 1, 1923 – April 2017; 202x ?	West Virginia University	Morgantown, West Virginia	Active	(Note: Chapter originated as the Avena Club (local) in 1920. As of April 2017, the university no longer recognizes the chapter as a campus organization. The chapter was approved to return in Spring 2022.)
018	Scorpion	May 24, 1923 – 1934; 1940–2012	Cornell University	Ithaca, New York	Inactive	(Note: The chapter is formally recognized as the Scorpion chapter in The Black Book. It originated as Kappa Psi (local) in 1907. Later, it absorbed the campus chapter of Sigma Phi Sigma. In 2011, the chapter accepted sixteen pledges from the local Sigma Alpha Epsilon chapter after it lost university recognition.)
019	**Tau**	January 17, 1924 – 1933; 1951–1977; 19xx ?–2014, 2024	Oregon State University	Corvallis, Oregon	Active	(Note: Chapter originated as Tau Sigma Phi (local) in 1922. In 2017, it was suspended through 2020 for membership misconduct.)
020	**Upsilon**	January 1, 1925 – 1942; 1948–1981; 1987–2002, 2012–2017, 2024	University of Michigan	Ann Arbor, Michigan	Active	(Note: Chapter originated as the Peers Club (local) in 1922.)
021	Phi	May 28, 1925 – 1935; 1947–1958; 1969–1996; 2008–2021	University of Nebraska–Lincoln	Lincoln, Nebraska	Inactive	(Note: Chapter originated as Alpha Delta (local) in 1923. It went inactive during the Great Depression but was later re-established.)
022	**Chi**	May 20, 1926 – 199x ?; 1990s	University of Washington	Seattle, Washington	Active	(Note: Chapter originated as Sigma Delta Theta (local) in 1922.)
023	Psi	November 23, 1926 – 2010	Gettysburg College	Gettysburg, Pennsylvania	Inactive	(Note: Chapter originated as Delta Kappa Sigma (local) in 1916.)
024	**Omega**	January 1, 1927	Albion College	Albion, Michigan	Active	(Note: Chapter originated as the Zetalethian Literary Society (local) in 1903.)
025	**Alpha-Alpha**	June 16, 1927 – 1937; 1962	Wabash College	Crawfordsville, Indiana	Active	(Note: Chapter originated as the Karnak Club (local) in 1921.)
026	**Alpha-Beta**	November 18, 1927 – 1977; 2024	Ohio University	Athens, Ohio	Active	(Note: Chapter originated as Kappa Psi Alpha (local) in 1921.)
027	**Alpha-Gamma**	December 29, 1927 – 2000; 2009	Washington State University	Pullman, Washington	Active	(Note: Chapter originated as Delta Tau Alpha (local) in 1920.)
028	**Alpha-Delta**	December 29, 1927 – 2003; 2022	University of Idaho	Moscow, Idaho	Active	(Note: Chapter originated as Tau Kappa Iota (local) in 1923. Later, it absorbed the campus chapter of Chi Alpha Pi.)
029	Alpha-Epsilon	October 4, 1928 – 1993	Monmouth College	Monmouth, Illinois	Inactive	(Note: Chapter originated as Phi Sigma Alpha (local) in 1909.)
030	Alpha-Zeta	December 20, 1928 – 202x ?	Purdue University	West Lafayette, Indiana	Inactive	(Note: Chapter originated as the Trigon Club (local) in 1922. Later, it absorbed the campus chapter of Sigma Mu Sigma. In July 2005, the university withdrew recognition of the chapter.)
031	Alpha-Eta	June 2, 1930 – 200x ?; 2011–2018	Rutgers University–New Brunswick	New Brunswick, New Jersey	Inactive	(Note: Chapter originated as Phi Sigma Tau (local) in 1927.)
032	**Alpha-Theta**	September 29, 1930	Whitman College	Walla Walla, Washington	Active	(Note: Chapter originated as Alpha Omicron Kappa (local) in 1923.)
033	Alpha-Iota	November 20, 1930 – 1943; 1948–1971; 2002–20xx ?	Hamilton College	Clinton, New York	Inactive	(Note: Chapter originated as Lambda Xi Sigma (local) in 1923.)
034	Alpha-Kappa	December 5, 1930 – 1943	University of Pennsylvania	Philadelphia, Pennsylvania	Inactive	(Note: Chapter originated as Alpha Pi Epsilon (local) in 1923. Later, it absorbed the campus chapter of Sigma Zeta.)
035	Alpha-Lambda	January 29, 1931 – 2020	Kansas State University	Manhattan, Kansas	Inactive	(Note: Chapter originated as Alpha Sigma Psi (local) in 1923.)
036	Alpha-Mu	September 18, 1931 – 1993	Ohio Wesleyan University	Delaware, Ohio	Inactive	(Note: Chapter originated as Beta Sigma Tau (local) in 1923.)
037	**Alpha-Nu**	January 1, 1932 – 1989; 2012	University of New Hampshire	Durham, New Hampshire	Active	(Note: Chapter originated as Delta Sigma Chi (local) in 1926.)
038	**Alpha-Xi**	December 16, 1932	Drake University	Des Moines, Iowa	Active	(Note: Chapter originated as Delta Zeta Chi (local) in 1921.)
039	**Alpha-Omicron**	March 23, 1934	New Mexico State University	Las Cruces, New Mexico	Active	(Note: Chapter originated as Gamma Sigma (local) in 1921.)
040	**Alpha-Pi**	June 1, 1935 – 2015; 2019	George Washington University	Washington, D.C.	Active	(Note: Chapter was acquired after ΤΚΕ absorbed the membership of Sigma Mu Sigma in 1934 during the Great Depression.)
041	**Alpha-Rho**	June 10, 1937 – 2009; 2014	University of Rhode Island	Kingston, Rhode Island	Active	(Note: Chapter originated as Phi Beta Chi (local) in 1921.)
042	Alpha-Sigma	June 3, 1938 – 1994	University of North Dakota	Grand Forks, North Dakota	Inactive	(Note: Chapter originated as Tau Sigma Rho (local) in 1923. Later, it absorbed the campus chapter of Phi Delta Epsilon.)
043	**Alpha-Tau**	May 26, 1939 – May 2017; November 4, 2023	Drexel University	Philadelphia, Pennsylvania	Active	(Note: Chapter originated as Phi Kappa Beta (local) in 1919. The university suspended the chapter for five years in May 2017. The chapter was approved to return to the university in Spring 2022. It was officially reinstated on November 4, 2023.)
044	Alpha-Upsilon	April 18, 1942 –19xx ?; 1987 – April 2014	Fort Hays State University	Hays, Kansas	Inactive	(Note: Chapter was closed by the national fraternity in 2014.)
045	Alpha-Phi	April 25, 1942 – 2018	University of Kansas	Lawrence, Kansas	Inactive	(Note: Chapter was founded as the fraternity's first colony in December 1939. It was approved to return to the university in Fall 2020.)
046	**Alpha-Chi**	September 12, 1942	University of Louisville	Louisville, Kentucky	Active	(Note: Chapter originated as Alpha Zeta (local) in 1929.)
047	**Alpha-Psi**	October 4, 1946 – 20xx ?	Davis & Elkins College	Elkins, West Virginia	Emerging Chapter	(Note: Chapter originated as Chi Omicron Delta (local) in 1915. After going inactive, it was reestablished as an emerging chapter as of December 9, 2024.)
048	Alpha-Omega	May 24, 1947 – 1956; 1977–1994	University of California, Los Angeles	Los Angeles, California	Inactive	
049	Beta-Alpha	October 26, 1946 – 1991	Bradley University	Peoria, Illinois	Inactive	(Note: Chapter originated as Beta Sigma Mu (local) in 1911.)
050	**Beta-Beta**	January 18, 1947	North Carolina State University	Raleigh, North Carolina	Active	(Note: Chapter originated as Alpha Lambda Tau on November 15, 1925, and was one of five chapters acquired after Alpha Lambda Tau announced its dissolution in 1947. It was the first ΤΚΕ chapter in the south and is known as 'Dixie Alpha'. It lost University recognition in 2017 but returned to campus in the spring of 2019.)
051	Beta-Gamma	February 1, 1947 – 1971; 1993–200x ?; 2008–2017	Oklahoma State University–Stillwater	Stillwater, Oklahoma	Inactive	
052	Beta-Delta	February 1, 1947 – 1972; 1981–1995; 2005 – March 2016	University of Maryland, College Park	College Park, Maryland	Inactive	(Note: This is one of five chapters acquired after Alpha Lambda Tau announced its dissolution in 1947.) (Note: The chapter was closed by the university and ΤΚΕ Headquarters in March 2016.)
053	**Beta-Epsilon**	February 22, 1947 – 1949; 1966	Trine University	Angola, Indiana	Active	(Note: Chapter was originally the Alpha chapter of a small national fraternity that merged into ΤΚΕ called Sigma Mu Sigma in 1935. However, the Trine chapter didn't join that merger due to a lack of school accreditation. In 1936, it became the Psi chapter of Alpha Lambda Tau, a Junior NIC member, not subject to the same accreditation rules. Eleven years later, Alpha Lambda Tau also merged with ΤΚΕ, bringing its Psi chapter with it. After ΤΚΕ gained this chapter in 1947, the NIC demanded that ΤΚΕ revoke the charter if they wanted to remain in the NIC because Tri-State University was still not an accredited university. ΤΚΕ revoked the charter of this new Beta-Epsilon chapter at the next Conclave. The chapter then affiliated with Kappa Sigma Kappa, another Junior NIC member, in 1952. When Kappa Sigma Kappa merged with Theta Xi in 1962, the chapter was again ineligible for the merger due to the accreditation status of Tri-State University. Tri-State University finally achieved accreditation, a year later, in 1963. The chapter petitioned Kappa Sigma and became a chapter of that fraternity in 1966. Now that the school was accredited, ΤΚΕ reestablished its chapter on the campus in 1989. This group retained the Beta-Epsilon chapter designation, even though the earlier group remains a chapter of Kappa Sigma.)
054	**Beta-Zeta**	April 10, 1947 – 2006; 2019	Louisiana Tech University	Ruston, Louisiana	Active	
055	**Beta-Eta**	March 8, 1947	Missouri University of Science and Technology	Rolla, Missouri	Active	
056	**Beta-Theta**	April 13, 1947 – 1997; 2008	University of Missouri	Columbia, Missouri	Active	(Note: Chapter originated as Tau Sigma Gamma (local) in 1946.)
057	Beta-Iota	May 30, 1947 – 1954	Iowa Wesleyan University	Mount Pleasant, Iowa	Inactive	(Note: Chapter originated as Tau Sigma Gamma (local) in 1946.)
058	Beta-Kappa	June 13, 1947 – 1970; 1987–1992	University of Oregon	Eugene, Oregon	Inactive	
059	**Beta-Lambda**	July 12, 1947 – 1999; 2005	Auburn University	Auburn, Alabama	Active	
060	Beta-Mu	December 6, 1947 – 1998; 2003–2019	Bucknell University	Lewisburg, Pennsylvania	Inactive	(Note: Chapter originated as Alpha Chi Mu (local) in 1921.)
061	Beta-Nu	December 6, 1947 – 2006; 2012–2012	Marshall University	Huntington, West Virginia	Inactive	(Note: Chapter originated as Chi Delta (local) in 1947.)
062	Beta-Xi	April 16, 1948 – 1970; 1983–199x ?; 2001 – January 23, 2014	Arizona State University	Tempe, Arizona	Inactive	(Note: Chapter originated as Mu Sigma Chi (local) in 1935. It was permanently banned in 2014 due to violating previous suspensions and hosting non-sanctioned events.)
063	Beta-Omicron	May 23, 1948 – 1979	Wayne State University	Detroit, Michigan	Inactive	(Note: Chapter originated as the Shahs Club (local) in 1925.)
064	**Beta-Pi**	June 5, 1948	Georgia Tech	Atlanta, Georgia	Active	
065	**Beta-Rho**	September 18, 1948	University of Akron	Akron, Ohio	Active	
066	**Beta-Sigma**	October 30, 1948	University of Southern California	Los Angeles, California	Active	(Note: Chapter originated as the Scorpion Club (local) in 1947.)
067	Beta-Tau	November 27, 1948 – 1958; 1964–1985	Florida Southern College	Lakeland, Florida	Inactive	(Note: Chapter originated as Phi Beta Chi (local) in 1947. Later, it absorbed the campus chapter of Phi Delta.)
068	**Beta-Upsilon**	December 11, 1948	University of Maine	Orono, Maine	Active	(Note: Chapter originated as Chi Rho Sigma (local) in 1947.)
069	**Beta-Phi**	January 1, 1949	Louisiana State University	Baton Rouge, Louisiana	Active	
070	**Beta-Chi**	February 12, 1949 – 1990; 2006–2021; 2023	Southern Illinois University Carbondale	Carbondale, Illinois	Active	(Note: Chapter originated as Delta Delta Chi (local) in 1940.)
071	Beta-Psi	March 6, 1949 – 2007	Arkansas State University	Jonesboro, Arkansas	Inactive	(Note: Chapter originated as Delta Omega Sigma (local) in 1933. In April 2016, Arkansas State University authorized the recolonization of ΤΚΕ on its campus.)
072	**Beta-Omega**	April 23, 1949 – 200s ?; 2008	Missouri State University	Springfield, Missouri	Active	(Note: Chapter originated as Tri-C, which stood for Camden Country Club, in 1929.)
073	Gamma-Alpha	May 21, 1949 – 1975	University of Wyoming	Laramie, Wyoming	Inactive	(Note: Chapter originated as Chi Eta (local) in 1948.)
074	**Gamma-Beta**	May 21, 1949 – 1975; 199x ?–2013	Colorado State University	Fort Collins, Colorado	Emerging Chapter	(Note: The chapter was approved to return to the university in Fall 2023.)
075	Gamma-Gamma	September 10, 1949 – 200x ?	University of Texas at El Paso	El Paso, Texas	Inactive	
076	**Gamma-Delta**	October 28, 1949 – 1961; 1966–200x ?; 202x ?	University of Miami	Coral Gables, Florida	Active	
077	**Gamma-Epsilon**	October 14, 1949 – 2006; 2017	Rensselaer Polytechnic Institute	Troy, New York	Active	
078	**Gamma-Zeta**	December 11, 1949 – 1972; 1994	Hartwick College	Oneonta, New York	Active	(Note: Chapter originated as Theta Chi Rho (local) in 1947.)
079	**Gamma-Eta**	December 18, 1949 – 1981; 2024	Idaho State University	Pocatello, Idaho	Active	(Note: Chapter originated as the Lancers (local) in 1948.)
080	**Gamma-Theta**	January 28, 1950	University of Florida	Gainesville, Florida	Active	(Note: Chapter originated as Psi Alpha (local) in 1949.)
081	**Gamma-Iota**	February 11, 1950 – 19xx ?; 1987–199x ?; 2005–2006; 2015	University of Colorado Boulder	Boulder, Colorado	Active	(Note: Chapter originated as Chi Mu (local) in 1949. Later, it absorbed the campus chapter of Zeta Theta Chi.)
082	Gamma-Kappa	April 16, 1950 – 2004; 2014 – February 2018	Indiana University Bloomington	Bloomington, Indiana	Inactive	(Note: Chapter originated as Chi Nu (local) in 1948. In February 2018, ΤΚΕ Headquarters closed the chapter until at least fall 2021 for undisclosed violations of its bylaws and constitution.)
083	**Gamma-Lambda**	May 19, 1950 – 1991; 199x ? – December 2000; 2022	San Diego State University	San Diego, California	Active	(Note: Chapter originated as Sigma Lambda (local) in 1927. It was closed by the university in 2000 and could not be considered for recolonization until at least the 2003–2004 academic year. The university approved its return in the fall of 2020.)
084	Gamma-Mu	May 21, 1950 – 1963; 1984–20xx ?; October 2017 – 2018	Furman University	Greenville, South Carolina	Inactive	(Note: Chapter originated as Phi Sigma (local) in 1941. It was closed in 2019 for risk management infractions.)
085	Gamma-Nu	May 28, 1950 – 199x ?; 2002–2006	University of Toledo	Toledo, Ohio	Inactive	(Note: Chapter originated as Pi Rho Sigma (local) in 1944. It closed in 2006 due to a lack of members.)
086	Gamma-Xi	December 2, 1950 – 1964; 199x ?–200x ?	University of New Mexico	Albuquerque, New Mexico	Inactive	(Note: Chapter originated as Tau Kappa (local) in 1949.)
087	Gamma-Omicron	December 3, 1950 – 199x ?; 2014 – 2025	University of Virginia	Charlottesville, Virginia	Inactive	(Note: Chapter originated as Psi Gamma (local) in 1949.)
088	Gamma-Pi	January 13, 1951 – 1971	Parsons College	Fairfield, Iowa	Inactive	(Note: Chapter originated as Alpha Kappa Chi (local) in 1921.) (Note: Parsons College permanently closed in 1973.)
089	Gamma-Rho	January 20, 1951 – 1972; 1976–199x ?; 2003-202x ?	Indiana State University	Terre Haute, Indiana	Inactive	(Note: Chapter originated as the Forum (local) in 1901.)
090	Gamma-Sigma	January 27, 1951 – 199x ?	University of Kentucky	Lexington, Kentucky	Inactive	(Note: Chapter originated as Tau Kappa (local) in 1947.)
091	Gamma-Tau	February 17, 1951 – 1978	University of Denver	Denver, Colorado	Inactive	
092	**Gamma-Upsilon**	March 3, 1951 – 1972; 19xx ?–199x ?; 2007	University of Texas at Austin	Austin, Texas	Active	
093	Gamma-Phi	May 11, 1951 – 19xx ?; 199x ?–200x ?	Emporia State University	Emporia, Kansas	Inactive	(Note: Chapter originated as Kappa Sigma Epsilon (local) in 1915.)
094	Gamma-Chi	May 12, 1951 – 1988	Valparaiso University	Valparaiso, Indiana	Inactive	(Note: Chapter originated as Alpha Epsilon (local) in 1902.)
095	Gamma-Psi	October 20, 1951 – May 2012	Butler University	Indianapolis, Indiana	Inactive	(Note: Chapter was closed due to membership misconduct.)
096	Gamma-Omega	March 14, 1952 – 19xx ?; 199x ?–200x ?	Eastern Illinois University	Charleston, Illinois	Inactive	(Note: Chapter originated as Epsilon Iota Sigma (local) in 1950.)
097	Delta-Alpha	March 22, 1952 – 2016	Western Michigan University	Kalamazoo, Michigan	Inactive	(Note: Chapter originated as Theta Delta Chi (local) in 1929.)
098	Delta-Beta	May 25, 1952 – 1972	Lake Forest College	Lake Forest, Illinois	Inactive	(Note: Chapter originated as Omega Psi (local) in 1902.)
099	**Delta-Gamma**	October 24, 1952 – 1972; 1990–2018; 20xx ?	University of Connecticut	Storrs, Connecticut	Active	(Note: Chapter originated as Phi Tau Eta (local) in 1950.)
100	Delta-Delta	February 28, 1953 – 200x ?	University of Northern Colorado	Greeley, Colorado	Inactive	(Note: Chapter originated as Delta Delta Tau (local) in 1948.)
101	**Delta-Epsilon**	May 9, 1953	Cleveland State University	Cleveland, Ohio	Active	(Note: Chapter originated as Beta Beta Alpha (local) in 1932.)
102	**Delta-Zeta**	May 23, 1953 – 1992; 2016	Southeast Missouri State University	Cape Girardeau, Missouri	Active	(Note: Chapter originated as Delta Chi Delta (local) in 1949.)
103	**Delta-Eta**	May 31, 1953 – 1982; 2002	Northern Illinois University	DeKalb, Illinois	Active	(Note: Chapter originated as Sigma Pi Delta (local) in 1952.)
104	**Delta-Theta**	January 9, 1954 – 1972; 1989	California State University, Long Beach	Long Beach, California	Active	(Note: Chapter originated as Alpha Kappa Chi (local) in 1952. It was officially associated with CSU–Long Beach in the fall of 2010.)
105	Delta-Iota	April 10, 1954 – 200x ?	Lenoir–Rhyne University	Hickory, North Carolina	Inactive	(Note: Chapter originated as Eta Delta Zeta (local) in 1947.)
106	Delta-Kappa	April 23, 1954 – 1966	High Point University	High Point, North Carolina	Inactive	(Note: Chapter originated as Iota Tau Kappa (local) in 1927.)
107	**Delta-Lambda**	April 23, 1954 – 200x ?; 2008	University of Central Missouri	Warrensburg, Missouri	Active	
108	Delta-Mu	May 15, 1954 – 1988	Pittsburg State University	Pittsburg, Kansas	Inactive	(Note: Chapter originated as Kappa Delta Kappa (local) in 1927.)
109	**Delta-Nu**	May 15, 1954 – 2015; 2019	Northwest Missouri State University	Maryville, Missouri	Active	(Note: Chapter was closed by the university in 2015, but it was approved to return to the university in the fall of 2018.)
110	**Delta-Xi**	May 16, 1954	Miami University	Oxford, Ohio	Active	(Note: Chapter originated as Sigma Tau Alpha (local) in 1949.)
111	Delta-Omicron	May 29, 1954 – 2000	Central Michigan University	Mount Pleasant, Michigan	Inactive	(Note: Chapter originated as Chi Phi Beta (local) in 1947.)
112	**Delta-Pi**	January 15, 1955 – 1972; 19xx ?	Eastern Michigan University	Ypsilanti, Michigan	Active	(Note: Chapter originated as Phi Delta Pi (local) in 1902.)
113	Delta-Rho	January 29, 1955 – 1974; 19xx ?–200x ?; 2007–2014	Indiana University of Pennsylvania	Indiana, Pennsylvania	Inactive	(Note: Chapter originated as Phi Sigma (local) in 1924.)
114	Delta-Sigma	March 26, 1955 – 1987	Morningside College	Sioux City, Iowa	Inactive	(Note: Chapter originated as Phi Sigma (local) in 1924.)
115	Delta-Tau	May 7, 1955 – 1969; 1979–2008	University of Northern Iowa	Cedar Falls, Iowa	Inactive	(Note: Chapter originated as Lambda Gamma Nu (local) in 1923.)
116	**Delta-Upsilon**	May 7, 1955 – 2023	Missouri Valley College	Marshall, Missouri	Emerging Chapter	
117	**Delta-Phi**	May 14, 1955 – 200x ?; 2009	Saint Francis University	Loretto, Pennsylvania	Active	(Note: Chapter originated as Chi Phi Chi (local) in 1946.)
118	Delta-Chi	May 8, 1955 – 2025	Gannon University	Erie, Pennsylvania	Inactive	(Note: Chapter originated as Gamma Chi (local) in 1954.)
119	**Delta-Psi**	May 14, 1955	North Dakota State University	Fargo, North Dakota	Active	(Note: Chapter originated as Kappa Sigma Chi (local) in 1928.)
120	Delta-Omega	May 13, 1955 – 1989	Western State College of Colorado	Gunnison, Colorado	Inactive	(Note: Chapter originated as Alpha Lambda Tau (local) in 1935.)
121	Epsilon-Alpha	May 21, 1955 – 2026	Saint Louis University	St. Louis, Missouri	Inactive	
122	**Epsilon-Beta**	May 27, 1955 – 1979; 2013	University of Tampa	Tampa, Florida	Active	(Note: Chapter originated as Pi Phi Omega (local) in 1954.)
123	Epsilon-Gamma	January 6, 1956 – 1966	Moravian College	Bethlehem, Pennsylvania	Inactive	(Note: Chapter originated as Sigma Theta Pi (local) in 1923.)
124	**Epsilon-Delta**	March 17, 1956 – 1972; 200x ?–20xx ?; 2013	University of Massachusetts Amherst	Amherst, Massachusetts	Active	(Note: Chapter originated as Delta Sigma Chi (local) in 1952.)
125	Epsilon-Epsilon	April 21, 1956 – 200x ?	University of Nebraska Omaha	Omaha, Nebraska	Inactive	(Note: Chapter originated as Phi Beta Chi (local) in 1953.)
126	**Epsilon-Zeta**	April 20, 1956 – 1987; 2008	Rider University	Lawrence Township, New Jersey	Active	(Note: Chapter originated from a chapter of [Phi Sigma Nu (junior fraternity)] in 1931.)
127	**Epsilon-Eta**	May 5, 1956	Southwestern Oklahoma State University	Weatherford, Oklahoma	Active	(Note: Chapter originated as Alpha Nu (local) in 1946.)
128	Epsilon-Theta	May 5, 1956 – 200x?; 20xx ? – 2023	Southeastern Oklahoma State University	Durant, Oklahoma	Inactive	(Note: Chapter originated as Beta Gamma (local) in 1955.)
129	Epsilon-Iota	May 5, 1956 – 1992; 2013–2017	Youngstown State University	Youngstown, Ohio	Inactive	(Note: Chapter originated as Pi Beta Chi (local) in 1948.)
130	**Epsilon-Kappa**	May 12, 1956 – 200x ?; 2004	Loyola University Chicago	Chicago, Illinois	Active	(Note: Chapter originated as the University Club (local) in 1938.)
131	Epsilon-Lambda	May 12, 1956 – 1980	University of Missouri–Kansas City	Kansas City, Missouri	Inactive	(Note: Chapter originated as Tau Kappa Nu (local) in 1945.)
132	Epsilon-Mu	May 20, 1956 – 1988	University of Louisiana at Monroe	Monroe, Louisiana	Inactive	(Note: Chapter originated as Alpha Theta Chi (local) in 1950.)
133	Epsilon-Nu	May 26, 1956 – 2014	University of Wisconsin–Stevens Point	Stevens Point, Wisconsin	Inactive	(Note: Chapter originated as Kappa Lambda Mu (local) in 1954. In 2014, the chapter house was raided by a SWAT team as part of a drug investigation, which resulted in the suspension of the chapter.)
134	**Epsilon-Xi**	June 3, 1956	Shepherd University	Shepherdstown, West Virginia	Active	(Note: Chapter originated as Zeta Sigma (local) in 1940.)
135	**Epsilon-Omicron**	May 26, 1956	University of Houston	Houston, Texas	Active	(Note: Chapter originated as Rho Beta (local) in 1951.)
136	Epsilon-Pi	September 29, 1956 – 1972	Colgate University	Hamilton, New York	Inactive	(Note: Chapter originated as Alpha Beta (local) in 1951.)
137	**Epsilon-Rho**	October 6, 1956 – 19xx ?; 1989–2019; 202x ?	Northern Arizona University	Flagstaff, Arizona	Active	(Note: Chapter originated as Tau Kappa Theta (local) in 1953.)
138	Epsilon-Sigma	February 23, 1957 – 2020	University of Central Oklahoma	Edmond, Oklahoma	Inactive	(Note: Chapter originated as Delta Nu (local) in 1954.)
139	Epsilon-Tau	April 27, 1957 – 1976; 19xx ?–200x ?	University of Rochester	Rochester, New York	Inactive	(Note: Chapter originated as Omega Alpha Kappa (local) in 1953.)
140	**Epsilon-Upsilon**	May 4, 1957	Northwestern State University	Natchitoches, Louisiana	Active	(Note: Chapter originated as Lambda Zeta (local) in 1924.)
141	Epsilon-Phi	May 10, 1957 – 1975	University of Detroit Mercy	Detroit, Michigan	Inactive	(Note: Chapter originated as Kappa Sigma Epsilon (local) in 1950.)
142	Epsilon-Chi	May 18, 1957 – 1975; 1982–200x ?; 2006–2020	University at Buffalo	Buffalo, New York	Inactive	(Note: Chapter originated as Sigma Alpha Nu (local) in 1945.)
143	Epsilon-Psi	May 18, 1957 – 1976	McNeese State University	Lake Charles, Louisiana	Inactive	(Note: Chapter originated as the Deacons (local) in 1940.)
144	Epsilon-Omega	May 18, 1957 – 1983	Minot State University	Minot, North Dakota	Inactive	(Note: Chapter originated as Alpha Kappa Delta (local) in 1928.)
145	**Zeta-Alpha**	May 25, 1957 – 19xx ?; 1989	Wagner College	Staten Island, New York	Active	(Note: Chapter originated as Omicron Pi Theta (local) in 1953.)
146	**Zeta-Beta**	May 24, 1957	University of Evansville	Evansville, Indiana	Active	(Note: Chapter originated as the Teke Club (local) in 1955.)
147	Zeta-Gamma	June 1, 1957 – 200x ?	Nebraska Wesleyan University	Lincoln, Nebraska	Inactive	(Note: Chapter originated as the Tri-Pod Club (local) in 1956)
148	**Zeta-Delta**	October 26, 1957	Alma College	Alma, Michigan	Active	(Note: Chapter originated as Phi Phi Alpha (local) in 1905.)
149	Zeta-Epsilon	January 10, 1958 – 1999	Waynesburg College	Waynesburg, Pennsylvania	Inactive	(Note: Chapter originated as Alpha Gamma (local) in 1956. It went inactive when fraternities phased out of college and town.)
150	Zeta-Zeta	January 10, 1958 – 1978; 1987–2014	University of Wisconsin–Milwaukee	Milwaukee, Wisconsin	Inactive	(Note: Chapter originated as Beta Phi Theta's Alpha chapter in 1917.)
151	Zeta-Eta	January 10, 1958 – 2003	Muhlenberg College	Allentown, Pennsylvania	Inactive	(Note: Chapter originated as Alpha Mu Iota (local) in 1955. The college suspended it for three years in February 2003.)
152	Zeta-Theta	February 22, 1958 – 200x ?; 2009 – 2025	Western Illinois University	Macomb, Illinois	Inactive	(Note: Chapter originated as Epsilon Tau Omega (local) in 1957.)
153	Zeta-Iota	March 15, 1958 – 1981	University of Manitoba	Winnipeg, Manitoba, Canada	Inactive	(Note: Chapter was founded as the first Canadian ΤΚΕ chapter. It was approved to return to the university in Fall 2016.)
154	Zeta-Kappa	May 30, 1958 – 201x ?	Portland State University	Portland, Oregon	Inactive	(Note: Chapter originated as Theta Nu (local) in 1954.)
155	**Zeta-Lambda**	May 30, 1958 – 1985; 2011	Bowling Green State University	Bowling Green, Ohio	Active	(Note: Chapter originated as Delta Epsilon (local) in 1948.)
156	**Zeta-Mu**	January 10, 1959	Worcester Polytechnic Institute	Worcester, Massachusetts	Active	(Note: Chapter originated as Sigma Delta (local) in 1956.)
157	**Zeta-Nu**	January 17, 1959	Valdosta State University	Valdosta, Georgia	Active	(Note: Chapter originated as Mu Alpha (local) in 1952.)
158	**Zeta-Xi**	March 22, 1959 – 1971; 19xx ?–200x ?	Boston University	Boston, Massachusetts	Emerging Chapter	(Note: Chapter originated as Lambda (local) in 1912. Later, it absorbed the campus chapter of Kappa Phi Alpha.)
159	Zeta-Omicron	April 4, 1959 – 200x ?	Western Carolina University	Cullowhee, North Carolina	Inactive	(Note: Chapter originated as Lambda Phi Kappa (local) in 1957.)
160	**Zeta-Pi**	April 4, 1959 – 1981; 1990	Culver–Stockton College	Canton, Missouri	Active	(Note: Chapter originated in 1868 as the Mathetrophian Literary Society and adopted the letters Mu Theta Nu (ΜΘΝ) until joining TKE.)
161	Zeta-Rho	April 19, 1959 –198x ?	American International College	Springfield, Massachusetts.	Inactive	(Note: Chapter originated as Sigma Alpha Phi (local) in 1932.)
162	Zeta-Sigma	April 24, 1959 – 1999	Marietta College	Marietta, Ohio	Inactive	(Note: Chapter originated as Kappa Alpha Epsilon (local) in 1955.)
163	Zeta-Tau	May 9, 1959 – 1995; 2005–2020	Shippensburg University of Pennsylvania	Shippensburg, Pennsylvania	Inactive	(Note: Chapter originated as Alpha Kappa Psi (local) in 1957.)
164	Zeta-Upsilon	May 9, 1959 – 1987	Alliance College	Cambridge Springs, Pennsylvania	Inactive	(Note: Chapter originated as Tau Sigma Pi (local) in 1931. The chapter closed when Alliance College closed in 1987.)
165	**Zeta-Phi**	May 16, 1959 – 1986; 1992	Rollins College	Winter Park, Florida	Active	(Note: Chapter originated as Tau Kappa Phi (local) in 1956.)
166	Zeta-Chi	May 22, 1959 – 1991	Murray State University	Murray, Kentucky	Inactive	(Note: Chapter originated as Delta Sigma (local) in 1958.)
167	Zeta-Psi	May 22, 1959 – 1982	Hamline University	Saint Paul, Minnesota	Inactive	(Note: Chapter originated as Sigma Phi Alpha (local) in 1921.)
168	Zeta-Omega	May 29, 1959 – 200x ?; 2007–201x ?	California University of Pennsylvania	California, Pennsylvania	Inactive	(Note: Chapter originated as Omicron Alpha Kappa (local) in 1957.)
169	Theta-Alpha	January 10, 1960 – 1967	Loyola Marymount University	Los Angeles, California	Inactive	(Note: Chapter originated as the Aristonian Club (local) in 1930.)
170	Theta-Beta	February 14, 1960 – 1988; 19xx ?–200x ?	Belmont Abbey College	Belmont, North Carolina	Inactive	(Note: Chapter originated as Gamma Tau Epsilon (local) in 1959.)
171	Theta-Gamma	April 22, 1960 – 200x ?	Lock Haven University of Pennsylvania	Lock Haven, Pennsylvania	Inactive	(Note: Chapter originated as Sigma Beta Iota (local) in 1958.)
172	**Theta-Delta**	May 14, 1960	Fairmont State University	Fairmont, West Virginia	Active	(Note: Chapter originated as Zeta Sigma (local) in 1935.)
173	Theta-Epsilon	May 13, 1960 – 1977; 19xx ?–200x ?	Humboldt State University	Arcata, California	Inactive	(Note: Chapter originated as Alpha Sigma (local) in 1958.)
174	Theta-Zeta	June 3, 1960 – 2023	Rutgers University–Newark	Newark, New Jersey	Inactive	(Note: Chapter originated as Sigma Beta Chi (local) in 1929.)
175	**Theta-Eta**	June 4, 1960 – 199x ?; 2005}	University of South Dakota	Vermillion, South Dakota	Active	
176	Theta-Theta	November 23, 1960 – 1977	California State University, Los Angeles	Los Angeles, California	Inactive	(Note: Chapter originated as Phi Delta (local) in 1948.)
177	**Theta-Iota**	February 18, 1961 –19xx ?; 199x ?	Northern Michigan University	Marquette, Michigan	Active	(Note: Chapter originated as Phi Delta (local) in 1948.)
178	**Theta-Kappa**	March 18, 1961 – 200x ?; 2015	LIU Post	Brookville, New York	Active	(Note: Chapter originated as Alpha Mu Omega (local) in 1953.)
179	**Theta-Lambda**	April 29, 1961 – 1987; 1998	Widener University	Chester, Pennsylvania	Active	(Note: Chapter originated as Delta Delta Rho (local) in 1951.)
180	Theta-Mu	May 5, 1961 – 199x ?; 2002–20xx ?	University of New Orleans	New Orleans, Louisiana	Inactive	(Note: Chapter originated as Theta Phi (local) in 1958.)
181	**Theta-Nu**	May 6, 1961 – 2012; 2022	Southeastern Louisiana University	Hammond, Louisiana	Active	(Note: Chapter originated as Alpha Omega (local) in 1946.)
182	**Theta-Xi**	May 11, 1961 – 1973; 19xx ?–1997	University of Arkansas	Fayetteville, Arkansas	Emerging Chapter	
183	**Theta-Omicron**	May 20, 1961 – 200x ?; 2010	Adrian College	Adrian, Michigan	Active	(Note: Chapter originated as Phi Tau (local) in 1959.)
184	**Theta-Pi**	May 20, 1961 – 2012	California State University, Chico	Chico, California	Emerging Chapter	(Note: Chapter originated as Alpha Sigma Nu (local) in 1958.)
185	**Theta-Rho**	May 20, 1961	St. Cloud State University	St. Cloud, Minnesota	Active	(Note: Chapter originated as Delta Eta (local) in 1960.)
186	Theta-Sigma	May 13, 1961 – 2020	St. John's University	New York City, New York	Inactive	(Note: Chapter originated as Sigma Lambda Pi (local) in 1956.)
187	**Theta-Tau**	May 13, 1961 – 1980; 19xx ?	Minnesota State University, Mankato	Mankato, Minnesota	Active	(Note: Chapter originated as Gamma Kappa Epsilon (local) in 1960.)
188	**Theta-Upsilon**	December 2, 1961 – 19xx ?; 2006–20xx ?; 2019	California State University, Sacramento	Sacramento, California	Active	(Note: Chapter originated as Chi Sigma Rho (local) in 1956.)
189	Theta-Phi	February 23, 1962 – 1983; 199x ?–200x ?	University of Wisconsin–La Crosse	La Crosse, Wisconsin	Inactive	(Note: Chapter originated as Zeta Sigma Phi (local) in 1953.)
190	Theta-Chi	April 6, 1962 – 1988; 2005–2022	Frostburg State University	Frostburg, Maryland	Inactive	(Note: Chapter originated as Omega Sigma Phi (local) in 1935.)
191	Theta-Psi	May 4, 1962 – 1987	Ferris State University	Big Rapids, Michigan	Inactive	(Note: Chapter originated as Omega Tau Omega (local) in 1949.)
192	Theta-Omega	May 5, 1962 – 20xx ?	University of Charleston	Charleston, West Virginia	Inactive	(Note: Chapter originated as Phi Sigma Phi (local) in 1929.)
193	Iota-Alpha	May 5, 1962 – 1982	University of Wisconsin–Superior	Superior, Wisconsin	Inactive	(Note: Chapter originated as Iota Delta Chi (local) in 1919.)
194	**Iota-Beta**	May 19, 1962 – 1982; 2006	Susquehanna University	Selinsgrove, Pennsylvania	Active	(Note: Chapter originated as Phi Epsilon (local) in 1961.)
195	Iota-Gamma	May 19, 1962 – 202x ?	Truman State University	Kirksville, Missouri	Inactive	
196	Iota-Delta	May 25, 1962 – 1978	Southern Oregon University	Ashland, Oregon	Inactive	(Note: Chapter originated as Tau Kappa (local) in 1956.)
197	Iota-Epsilon	January 19, 1963 – 1988	Minnesota State University Moorhead	Moorhead, Minnesota	Inactive	(Note: Chapter originated as Kappa Nu Alpha (local) in 1961.)
198	**Iota-Zeta**	February 1, 1963 – 199x ?; 2003–2015, 2024	Syracuse University	Syracuse, New York	Active	(Note: The chapter had its origin in 1907 as the Alpha chapter of Theta Alpha. That small national fraternity merged into Delta Sigma Lambda in 1933, but by 1937, with the demise of its new national fraternity, the Syracuse chapter reverted to local status, naming itself Pi Alpha Chi. In 1947, it again took the name Theta Alpha, and in 1963 it became the Iota-Zeta chapter of Tau Kappa Epsilon.)
199	Iota-Eta	March 8, 1963 – 1987	Slippery Rock University of Pennsylvania	Slippery Rock, Pennsylvania	Inactive	(Note: Chapter originated as Gamma Phi (local) in 1958. The chapter went dormant after an underage student died in a car crash after being served alcohol at a chapter party in 1986.)
200	**Iota-Theta**	March 23, 1963	Centenary College of Louisiana	Shreveport, Louisiana	Active	(Note: Chapter originated as Alpha Nu (local) in 1962.)
201	Iota-Iota	April 27, 1963 – 200x ?	La Salle University	Philadelphia, Pennsylvania	Inactive	(Note: Chapter originated as Phi Sigma Upsilon (local) in 1959.)
202	**Iota-Kappa**	April 27, 1963 – 2000; 2016	Clarkson University	Potsdam, New York	Active	(Note: Chapter originated as Phi Delta (local) in 1960.)
203	Iota-Lambda	April 27, 1963 – 19xx ?	Indiana Institute of Technology	Fort Wayne, Indiana	Inactive	(Note: Chapter originated as Kappa Sigma Phi (local) in 1946.)
204	Iota-Mu	May 4, 1963 – xxxx ?	University of Findlay	Findlay, Ohio	Inactive	(Note: Chapter originated as Sigma Kappa Tau (local) in 1960.)
205	Iota-Nu	May 11, 1963 – 200x ?	Hillsdale College	Hillsdale, Michigan	Inactive	(Note: Chapter originated as Kappa Sigma Kappa in 1929.)
206	**Iota-Xi**	May 12, 1963	Concord University	Athens, West Virginia	Active	(Note: Chapter originated as Tri Delta Tau (local) in 1921.)
207	**Iota-Omicron**	May 18, 1963 – 2008; 2017	University of Wisconsin–Whitewater	Whitewater, Wisconsin	Active	(Note: Chapter originated as the Cavaliers (local) in 1960.)
208	**Iota-Pi**	May 25, 1963 – 1971; 198x ?	Kent State University	Kent, Ohio	Active	(Note: Chapter originated as Tau Beta Rho (local) in 1959.)
209	Iota-Rho	June 15, 1963 – 2005	Seton Hall University	South Orange, New Jersey	Inactive	(Note: Chapter originated as Delta Beta Chi (local) in 1962.)
210	Iota-Sigma	December 14, 1963 – 199x ?; 200x ?–20xx?	University of Wisconsin–Eau Claire	Eau Claire, Wisconsin	Inactive	(Note: Chapter originated as Eta Phi (local) in 1949.)
211	Iota-Tau	January 25, 1964 – 200x ?	East Stroudsburg University of Pennsylvania	East Stroudsburg, Pennsylvania	Inactive	
212	Iota-Upsilon	February 28, 1964 – 2023	University of West Alabama	Livingston, Alabama	Inactive	(Note: Chapter originated as Kappa Alpha Epsilon (local) in 1950.)
213	Iota-Phi	February 28, 1964 – 200x ?	Defiance College	Defiance, Ohio	Inactive	(Note: Chapter originated as Delta Chi Rho (local) in 1962.)
214	Iota-Chi	May 2, 1964 – 1975	New Mexico Highlands University	Las Vegas, New Mexico	Inactive	
215	Iota-Psi	May 2, 1964 – 1988	Dickinson State University	Dickinson, North Dakota	Inactive	(Note: Chapter originated as Epsilon Omega (local) in 1963.)
216	**Iota-Omega**	May 16, 1964 – 20xx ?	Glenville State University	Glenville, West Virginia	Emerging Chapter	(Note: Chapter originated as the Holy Roller Court (local) in 1928.)
217	Kappa-Alpha	May 23, 1964 – 19xx ?	Franciscan University of Steubenville	Steubenville, Ohio	Inactive	
218	**Kappa-Beta**	December 29, 1964 – 1983; 199x ?–200x ?; 20xx ?	University of Texas Rio Grande Valley	Edinburg, Texas	Active	
219	Kappa-Gamma	March 26, 1965 – 1977	Catholic University of America	Washington, D.C.	Inactive	(Note: Chapter originated as Chi Alpha Beta (local) in 1960.)
220	Kappa-Delta	March 6, 1965 – 2020	Old Dominion University	Norfolk, Virginia	Inactive	(Note: Chapter originated as Pi Phi Sigma (local) in 1955.)
221	Kappa-Epsilon	May 15, 1965 – 1983	Northland College	Ashland, Wisconsin	Inactive	
222	Kappa-Zeta	May 15, 1965 – 1969	Hobart College	Geneva, New York	Inactive	(Note: Chapter originated as Phi Phi Delta (local) in 1900.)
223	**Kappa-Eta**	May 29, 1965	New Jersey Institute of Technology	Newark, New Jersey	Active	(Note: Chapter originated as Phi Beta Tau (local) in 1943.)
224	Kappa-Theta	June 5, 1965 – 1990	Adelphi University	Garden City, New York	Inactive	(Note: Chapter originated as Epsilon Phi (local) in 1947.)
225	Kappa-Iota	March 5, 1966 – 1975; 198x ?–2003	University of Hartford	West Hartford, Connecticut	Inactive	(Note: Chapter originated as Omega Kappa Delta (local) in 1958.)
226	Kappa-Kappa	March 12, 1966 – 2018	Monmouth University	West Long Branch, New Jersey	Inactive	(Note: Chapter originated as Tau Kappa Beta (local) in 1956.)
227	Kappa-Lambda	March 26, 1966 – 1987	University of Minnesota Morris	Morris, Minnesota	Inactive	(Note: Chapter originated as Alpha Rho Psi (local) in 1960.)
228	Kappa-Mu	April 16, 1966 – 2013	Edinboro University of Pennsylvania	Edinboro, Pennsylvania	Inactive	(Note: Chapter originated as Kappa Delta Phi (local) in 1938.)
229	**Kappa-Nu**	April 23, 1966 – 2014, 202x ?	Rockhurst University	Kansas City, Missouri	Active	(Note: Chapter originated as Sigma Phi Delta (local) in 1964.)
230	Kappa-Xi	May 7, 1966 – 1974	Black Hills State University	Spearfish, South Dakota	Inactive	(Note: Chapter originated as Psi Omega Chi (local) in 1964.)
231	Kappa-Omicron	May 7, 1966 – 1977	Thomas Jefferson University	Philadelphia, Pennsylvania	Inactive	(Note: Chapter originated as Delta Kappa Phi in 1899. It was approved to return to the university in the fall of 2016.)
232	Kappa-Pi	May 28, 1966 – 1980	University of San Diego	San Diego, California	Inactive	(Note: Chapter originated as Pi Kappa Epsilon (local) in 1961.)
233	Kappa-Rho	May 29, 1966 – 1984	Mississippi State University	Starkville, Mississippi	Inactive	
234	**Kappa-Sigma**	November 5, 1966 – 1974; 2012	City College of New York	New York City, New York	Active	(Note: Chapter originated as Gamma Delta Phi (local) in 1963.)
235	**Kappa-Tau**	January 14, 1967 – 1986; 1991–200x ?; 2006–2012; 2019	University of Arizona	Tucson, Arizona	Active	(Note: Chapter originated as Beta Nu (local) in 1965.)
236	Kappa-Upsilon	January 21, 1967 – 1980	Villanova University	Villanova, Pennsylvania	Inactive	(Note: Chapter originated as Phi Kappa Pi (local) in 1907.)
237	Kappa-Phi	February 4, 1967 – 1978; 199x ?–200x ?	University of Wisconsin–Oshkosh	Oshkosh, Wisconsin	Inactive	
238	Kappa-Chi	March 18, 1967 – 2023	Concordia University	Montreal, Quebec, Canada	Inactive	(Note: Chapter originated as Kappa Chi (local) in 1965.)
239	**Kappa-Psi**	March 18, 1967 – 197x ?; 1987 – December 2014; 2024	Quinnipiac University	Hamden, Connecticut	Active	(Note: Chapter originated as Kappa Delta Mu (local) in 1951. It was suspended by the university in December 2014.)
240	Kappa-Omega	March 18, 1967 – 1979	Washburn University	Topeka, Kansas	Inactive	(Note: Chapter originated as the Cambridge Gentlemen (local) in 1965.)
241	Lambda-Alpha	April 26, 1967 – 1988; 2003–2005	University of South Florida	Tampa, Florida	Inactive	(Note: Chapter originated as Phi Sigma Xi (local) in 1966. It was suspended by the university in 2005.)
242	Lambda-Beta	May 6, 1967 – 1983	Lewis University	Romeoville, Illinois	Inactive	(Note: Chapter originated as Pi Iota Tau (local) in 1965.)
243	**Lambda-Gamma**	May 13, 1967	University of Cincinnati	Cincinnati, Ohio	Active	(Note: Chapter originated as the University of Cincinnati chapter of the American Association of Commons Clubs in 1926.)
244	Lambda-Delta	May 14, 1967 –200x ?	University of Southern Maine	Portland, Maine	Inactive	
245	Lambda-Epsilon	April 20, 1967 – 199x ?; 2005 – 2015	Clarion University of Pennsylvania	Clarion, Pennsylvania	Inactive	(Note: Chapter originated as Gamma Delta Iota (local) in 1964.)
246	**Lambda-Zeta**	April 27, 1967	Troy University	Troy, Alabama	Active	
247	**Lambda-Eta**	January 7, 1968 – 199x ?; 2007	University of Iowa	Iowa City, Iowa	Active	
248	Lambda-Theta	February 3, 1968 – 1977	Santa Fe University of Art and Design	Santa Fe, New Mexico	Inactive	(Note: SFUAD permanently closed in May 2018.)
249	**Lambda-Iota**	February 24, 1968 – 199x ?; 2003	Florida State University	Tallahassee, Florida	Active	(Note: Chapter originated as Sigma Gamma (local) in 1967.)
250	Lambda-Kappa	March 23, 1968 – 1979	DePaul University	Chicago, Illinois	Inactive	(Note: Chapter originated as Tau Kappa Phi (local) in 1965.)
251	Lambda-Lambda	April 20, 1968 – 20xx ?	Utica College	Utica, New York	Inactive	(Note: Chapter originated as Alpha Delta Epsilon (local) in 1946.)
252	Lambda-Mu	April 27, 1968 – 1989	Elon University	Elon, North Carolina	Inactive	(Note: Chapter originated as Alpha Pi Delta (local) in 1926.)
253	Lambda-Nu	May 4, 1968 – 1983	University of Wisconsin–Stout	Menomonie, Wisconsin	Inactive	
254	Lambda-Xi	May 4, 1968 – 1983	Sul Ross State University	Alpine, Texas	Inactive	
255	Lambda-Omicron	May 11, 1968 – 1983	University of North Texas	Denton, Texas	Inactive	(Note: Chapter originated as Nu Phi (local) in 1964.)
256	Lambda-Pi	May 12, 1968 – 1975; 19xx ?–200x ?	Northeastern Illinois University	Chicago, Illinois	Inactive	(Note: Chapter originated as Sigma Kappa Epsilon (local) in 1964.)
257	Lambda-Rho	May 11, 1968 – 1978	Plymouth State University	Plymouth, New Hampshire	Inactive	(Note: Chapter originated as Phi Mu Kappa (local) in 1963.)
258	Lambda-Sigma	May 18, 1968 – 2001; 2010–2024	Keene State College	Keene, New Hampshire	Inactive	(Note: Chapter originated as Theta Chi Delta (local) in 1954.)
259	Lambda-Tau	May 18, 1968 – 1993	Northrop University	Inglewood, California	Inactive	(Note: Chapter originated as Alpha Epsilon Rho (local) in 1966.) (Note: Northrop University permanently closed in September 1993.)
260	**Lambda-Upsilon**	May 25, 1968 – 19xx ?; 199x ?–2011; 2017	Georgia Southern University	Statesboro, Georgia	Active	
261	**Lambda-Phi**	September 28, 1968	Bryant University	Smithfield, Rhode Island	Active	(Note: Chapter originated as Beta Iota Beta (local) in 1944.)
262	Lambda-Chi	September 28, 1968 – 2023	Wayne State College	Wayne, Nebraska	Inactive	
263	**Lambda-Psi**	November 16, 1968 – 2017; 2024	East Carolina University	Greenville, North Carolina	Active	(Note: Chapter originated as Alpha Kappa Psi (local) in 1966. In January 2018, the chapter was shut down by ΤΚΕ Headquarters for four years through the end of Fall 2021. It was approved to return to the university in the spring of 2022.)
264	Lambda-Omega	November 29, 1968 – 19xx ?	Georgia State University	Atlanta, Georgia	Inactive	(Note: Chapter originated as Kappa Alpha Epsilon (local) in 1957.)
265	**Mu-Alpha**	January 11, 1969 – 1990; 1997–2007; 2021	West Chester University	West Chester, Pennsylvania	Active	(Note: Chapter originated as Kappa Sigma Alpha (local) in 1967. It lost University recognition in 2007 due to underage drinking and was suspended for five years.)
266	**Mu-Beta**	February 15, 1969	Eastern Kentucky University	Richmond, Kentucky	Active	(Note: Chapter originated as Kappa Tau Epsilon (local) in 1966.)
267	Mu-Gamma	February 22, 1969 – 2023	Midwestern State University	Wichita Falls, Texas	Inactive	(Note: Chapter originated as Pi Delta Upsilon (local) in 1965.)
268	Mu-Delta	March 1, 1969 – 1995; 2010–2012	Athens State University	Athens, Alabama	Inactive	(Note: Chapter originated as Phi Delta Tau (local) in 1965.)
269	Mu-Epsilon	March 1, 1969 – 200x ?	University of Massachusetts Lowell	Lowell, Massachusetts	Inactive	(Note: Chapter originated as Lambda Tau (local) in 1967.)
270	**Mu-Zeta**	March 8, 1969	Nicholls State University	Thibodaux, Louisiana	Active	
271	Mu-Eta	March 15, 1969 – 200x ?	Northeastern University	Boston, Massachusetts	Inactive	(Note: Chapter originated as Theta Rho Epsilon (local) in 1963.)
272	**Mu-Theta**	April 12, 1969	Lycoming College	Williamsport, Pennsylvania	Active	
273	Mu-Iota	April 26, 1969 – 1983	Western New England University	Springfield, Massachusetts	Inactive	(Note: Chapter originated as Sigma Sigma Iota (local) in 1966.)
274	Mu-Kappa	April 26, 1969 – 1983	University of New Haven	West Haven, Connecticut	Inactive	(Note: Chapter originated as Phi Zeta Psi (local) in 1963.)
275	**Mu-Lambda**	May 3, 1969	Michigan Technological University	Houghton, Michigan	Active	
276	Mu-Mu	May 10, 1969 – 2015	Hofstra University	Hempstead, New York	Inactive	(Note: Chapter originated as Upsilon Gamma Alpha (local) in 1947.)
277	**Mu-Nu**	May 17, 1969	University of Wisconsin–Platteville	Platteville, Wisconsin	Active	(Note: Chapter originated as Phi Delta Chi (local) in 1965.)
278	**Mu-Xi**	May 17, 1969 – 1989; 199x ?	California State University, Fullerton	Fullerton, California	Active	(Note: Chapter originated as Kappa Gamma Nu (local) in 1966.)
279	**Mu-Omicron**	May 17, 1969	Tennessee Tech	Cookeville, Tennessee	Active	(Note: Chapter originated as Alpha Nu Delta (local) in 1965.)
280	Mu-Pi	May 17, 1969 – 1972	Stony Brook Southampton	Southampton, New York	Inactive	(Note: Chapter originated as Alpha Omega (local) in 1963.)
281	Mu-Rho	May 24, 1969 – 1978	Bethel University	McKenzie, Tennessee	Inactive	(Note: Chapter originated as Omega Phi (local) in 1936.)
282	**Mu-Sigma**	May 31, 1969 – 199x ?; 2001–2014; 2026	Morehead State University	Morehead, Kentucky	Active	(Note: Chapter originated as Zeta Alpha Phi (local) in 1966.)
283	**Mu-Tau**	November 8, 1969 – 2019; 2025	James Madison University	Harrisonburg, Virginia	Active	(Note: Chapter originated as Sigma Delta Rho (local) in 1947.)
284	**Mu-Upsilon**	November 22, 1969 – 1979; 1990–2013, 2024	Illinois State University	Normal, Illinois	Active	(Note: Chapter originated as Al Azhar (local) in 1964. After being suspended, it was approved to return to the university in the fall of 2022.)
285	Mu-Phi	November 22, 1969 – 1974	Texas A&M University–Corpus Christi	Corpus Christi, Texas	Inactive	(Note: Chapter originated as Theta Sigma Chi (local) in 1966.)
286	Mu-Chi	January 24, 1970 – 1985; 2006 - 2025	University of North Carolina Wilmington	Wilmington, North Carolina	Inactive	(Note: Chapter originated as Sigma Phi Kappa (local) in 1967.)
287	Mu-Psi	February 14, 1970 – 200x ?	University of Massachusetts Dartmouth	Dartmouth, Massachusetts	Inactive	(Note: Chapter originated as Phi Psi (local) in 1904.)
288	**Mu-Omega**	February 21, 1970 – 2016; 2022	George Mason University	Fairfax, Virginia	Active	(Note: Chapter originated as the Symposium (local).)
289	Nu-Alpha	February 21, 1970 – 1977; 2010–2023	Niagara University	Lewiston, New York	Inactive	
290	Nu-Beta	February 28, 1970 – 1992	Albright College	Reading, Pennsylvania	Inactive	(Note: Chapter originated as Kappa Upsilon Phi (local) in 1900.)
291	Nu-Gamma	March 15, 1970 – 1984	University of St. Thomas		Inactive	(Note: Chapter originated as Delta Pi (local) in 1967.)
292	Nu-Delta	April 18, 1970 – 1979	Colorado State University Pueblo	Pueblo, Colorado	Inactive	(Note: Chapter originated as Iota Xi (local) in 1955.)
293	**Nu-Epsilon**	April 18, 1970 – 200x ?	Suffolk University	Boston, Massachusetts	Emerging Chapter	(Note: Chapter originated as Sigma Upsilon (local) in 1969.)
294	Nu-Zeta	May 2, 1970 – 2002	Elmhurst College	Elmhurst, Illinois	Inactive	(Note: Chapter originated as Epsilon Chi (local) in 1968.)
295	**Nu-Eta**	May 2, 1970 – 1990; 20xx ?	Boise State University	Boise, Idaho	Active	(Note: Chapter originated as Pi Sigma (local) in 1949.)
296	**Nu-Theta**	May 9, 1970 – 1978; 200x ?–20xx ?	University of Utah	Salt Lake City, Utah	Expansion	
297	Nu-Iota	May 16, 1970 – 1987; 20xx ?–201x ?	University of Illinois Chicago	Chicago, Illinois	Inactive	(Note: The Nu-Iota chapter originated as Kappa Phi (local) in 1965.)
298	Nu-Kappa	May 16, 1970 – 1976; 2000–2021	Winona State University	Winona, Minnesota	Inactive	
299	**Nu-Lambda**	November 28, 1970	University of Southern Indiana	Evansville, Indiana	Active	(Note: Chapter originated as Sigma Tau Epsilon (local) in 1969.)
300	Nu-Mu	December 19, 1970 – 2024	University of South Alabama	Mobile, Alabama	Inactive	(Note: Chapter originated as Kappa Epsilon (local), established in 1965.)
301	Nu-Nu	February 13, 1971 – 1976; 1990–200x ?	University of Windsor	Windsor, Ontario, Canada	Inactive	
302	**Nu-Xi**	February 13, 1971 – 1988; 1998	Stephen F. Austin State University	Nacogdoches, Texas	Active	
303	Nu-Omicron	February 20, 1971 – 1988	University of Bridgeport	Bridgeport, Connecticut	Inactive	
304	**Nu-Pi**	March 6, 1971 – 200x ?; 2021	University of Delaware	Newark, Delaware	Active	(Note: Chapter originated as Delta Epsilon Chi (local) in 1968.)
305	Nu-Rho	March 6, 1971 – 1983; 199x ?–200x ?	Salem International University	Salem, West Virginia	Inactive	(Note: Chapter originated as Omega Delta Phi (local) in 1968.)
306	Nu-Sigma	March 6, 1971 – 1985	Upper Iowa University	Fayette, Iowa	Inactive	(Note: Chapter originated as Tau Kappa Upsilon (local) in 1965.)
307	Nu-Tau	March 20, 1971 – 200x ?	Mansfield University of Pennsylvania	Mansfield, Pennsylvania	Inactive	(Note: Chapter originated as B R A D (local) in 1968.)
308	Nu-Upsilon	April 3, 1971 – 1982	Texas A&M University–Kingsville	Kingsville, Texas	Inactive	(Note: Chapter originated as Gamma Delta Chi (local) in 1968.)
309	**Nu-Phi**	April 17, 1971	Duquesne University	Pittsburgh, Pennsylvania	Active	(Note: Chapter originated as Alpha Gamma Omega (local) in 1965.)
310	Nu-Chi	April 24, 1971 – 20xx ?	Bentley University	Waltham, Massachusetts	Inactive	(Note: Chapter originated as Beta Chi (local) in 1968.)
311	Nu-Psi	May 8, 1971 – 1977; 2010–20xx ?	West Liberty University	West Liberty, West Virginia	Inactive	(Note: Chapter originated as Kappa Delta Kappa (local) in 1950.)
312	**Nu-Omega**	May 15, 1971	William Paterson University	Wayne, New Jersey	Active	(Note: Chapter originated as Delta Omega Epsilon (local) in 1949.)
313	Xi-Alpha	1968 – 1975	Massachusetts College of Liberal Arts	North Adams, Massachusetts	Inactive	
314	Xi-Beta	May 22, 1971 – 200x ?	Southern Illinois University Edwardsville	Edwardsville, Illinois	Inactive	(Note: The chapter was approved to return to the university in Fall 2022 or 2023.)
315	**Xi-Gamma**	May 22, 1971	New York Institute of Technology	Old Westbury, New York	Active	
316	Xi-Delta	May 22, 1971 – 200x ?	Fairleigh Dickinson University	Madison, New Jersey	Inactive	(Note: Chapter originated as Chi Nu Kappa (local) in 1958.)
317	Xi-Epsilon	May 22, 1971 – 1975	Huron University College	London, Ontario, Canada	Inactive	
318	Xi-Zeta	May 22, 1971 – 1977	Bluefield State College	Bluefield, West Virginia	Inactive	
319	Xi-Eta	May 29, 1971 – 1983; 1999–20xx ?	Missouri Western State University	St. Joseph, Missouri	Inactive	(Note: Chapter originated as Phi Kappa Tau (local) in 1969.)
320	**Xi-Theta**	June 5, 1971 – 1978; May 7, 1988 – 1997; 2000–2019; 202x ?	University of West Georgia	Carrollton, Georgia	Active	(Note: Chapter originated as Pi Kappa Sigma (local) in 1969.)
321	**Xi-Iota**	December 4, 1971	University of Central Florida	Orlando, Florida	Active	(Note: Chapter originated as Pi Kappa Epsilon (local) in 1968.)
322	Xi-Kappa	March 4, 1972 – 1976	Baker University	Baldwin City, Kansas	Inactive	
323	**Xi-Lambda**	March 25, 1972 – 2003; 2011–2022	University of Georgia	Athens, Georgia	Emerging Chapter	(Note: Chapter originated as Upsilon Gamma Alpha (local) in 1970.)
324	Xi-Mu	April 8, 1972 – 200x ?	University of Dayton	Dayton, Ohio	Inactive	(Note: Chapter originated as Upsilon Delta Lambda (local) in 1959.)
325	Xi-Nu	April 15, 1972 – 19xx ?	Miami Dade College	Miami, Florida	Inactive	
326	Xi-Xi	April 29, 1972 – 2015	Texas State University	San Marcos, Texas	Inactive	(Note: Chapter originated as Delta Sigma Lambda (local) in 1968.)
327	Xi-Omicron	May 20, 1972 – 200x ?	William Penn University	Oskaloosa, Iowa	Inactive	(Note: Chapter originated as Sigma Delta Pi (local) in 1961.)
328	Xi-Pi	May 30, 1972 – 1987	Valley City State University	Valley City, North Dakota	Inactive	
329	Xi-Rho	May 20, 1972 – 1978	Lander University	Greenwood, South Carolina	Inactive	(Note: Chapter originated as Lambda Pi (local) in 1969.)
330	Xi-Sigma	January 27, 1973 – 1976	Milton College	Milton, Wisconsin	Inactive	(Note: Milton College permanently closed in 1982.)
331	**Xi-Tau**	January 27, 1973	Lyon College	Batesville, Arkansas	Active	(Note: Chapter originated as Chi Beta Phi (local) in 1964.)
332	**Xi-Upsilon**	February 24, 1973	Rochester Institute of Technology	Henrietta, New York	Active	(Note: Chapter originated as Zeta Tau (local).)
333	**Xi-Phi**	February 24, 1973 – 1977; 199x ?–2017; 2026	Kutztown University of Pennsylvania	Kutztown, Pennsylvania	Active	
334	Xi-Chi	February 24, 1973 – 2025	Kennesaw State University	Cobb County, Georgia	Inactive	(Note: Chapter originated as Delta Tau Phi (local).)
335	Xi-Psi	March 31, 1973 – 1990	South Dakota State University	Brookings, South Dakota	Inactive	
336	**Xi-Omega**	April 14, 1973	Virginia Tech	Blacksburg, Virginia	Active	(Note: Chapter originated as Alpha Chi (local) in 1969.)
337	Omicron-Alpha	April 14, 1973 – 2017	Appalachian State University	Boone, North Carolina	Inactive	(Note: In 2019, the chapter lost its university recognition due to membership misconduct.)
338	Omicron-Beta	April 28, 1973 – 1980	Saint Mary's University of Minnesota	Winona, Minnesota	Inactive	
339	Omicron-Gamma	May 5, 1973 – 1982; 19xx ?–200x ?	Central Connecticut State University	New Britain, Connecticut	Inactive	
340	Omicron-Delta	May 12, 1973 – 1981; 1983 – 2000	University of North Carolina at Pembroke	Pembroke, North Carolina	Inactive	(Note: Chapter originated as Alpha Theta Mu (local) in 1967.)
341	Omicron-Epsilon	May 19, 1973 – 200x ?	Bemidji State University	Bemidji, Minnesota	Inactive	(Note: Chapter originated as Lambda Alpha Beta (local) in 1966.)
342	Omicron-Zeta	May 19, 1973 – 19xx ?	Weber State University	Ogden, Utah	Inactive	(Note: Chapter originated as Beta Phi Beta (local).)
343	Omicron-Eta	March 16, 1974 – 1978; 19xx ?–200x ?	West Virginia University Institute of Technology	Beckley, West Virginia	Inactive	(Note: Chapter originated as Alpha Zeta Delta (local) in 1972.)
344	Omicron-Theta	March 30, 1974 – 202x ?	Newberry College	Newberry, South Carolina	Inactive	(Note: Chapter originated as Sigma Epsilon (local) in 1968.)
345	Omicron-Iota	May 4, 1974 – 200x ?	Rowan University	Glassboro, New Jersey	Inactive	(Note: Chapter originated as Tau Omega Phi (local) in 1968.)
346	**Omicron-Kappa**	May 9, 1974 – 1988; 199x ?–200x ?	University of Louisiana at Lafayette	Lafayette, Louisiana	Active	
347	Omicron-Lambda	May 18, 1974 – 1988	Broward College	Fort Lauderdale, Florida	Inactive	(Note: Chapter originated as Tau Kappa Beta (local).)
348	Omicron-Mu	May 10, 1975 – 200x ?	Husson College	Bangor, Maine	Inactive	(Note: Chapter originated as Alpha Omega (local) in 1967.)
349	**Omicron-Nu**	May 24, 1975 – 1976; 1988	Florida Institute of Technology	Melbourne, Florida	Active	(Note: Chapter originated as Eta Sigma (local) in 1973.)
350	**Omicron-Xi**	September 27, 1975 – 1984; 2021	University of Alabama	Tuscaloosa, Alabama	Active	
351	Omicron-Omicron	March 13, 1976 – 1996	University of Missouri–St. Louis	St. Louis, Missouri	Inactive	(Note: Chapter originated as Tau Kappa Delta (local).)
352	Omicron-Pi	March 20, 1976 – 2026	Baylor University	Waco, Texas	Inactive	
353	**Omicron-Rho**	November 6, 1976	Texas Tech University	Lubbock, Texas	Active	(Note: Chapter originated as Tau Epsilon Kappa (local) in 1975.)
354	**Omicron-Sigma**	December 11, 1976	Indiana University Southeast	New Albany, Indiana	Active	(Note: Chapter originated as Alpha Delta Omega (local) in 1975.)
355	Omicron-Tau	January 22, 1977 – 2020	Columbus State University	Columbus, Georgia	Inactive	
356	**Omicron-Upsilon**	March 19, 1977	York College of Pennsylvania	Spring Garden Township, Pennsylvania	Active	(Note: Chapter originated as Alpha Sigma Chi (local).)
357	Omicron-Phi	April 12, 1977 – 1987; 200x ?–20xx ?	University of Oklahoma	Norman, Oklahoma	Inactive	(Note: The chapter was approved to return to the university in the fall of 2024.)
358	Omicron-Chi	April 30, 1977 – 200x ?	Robert Morris University	Moon Township, Pennsylvania	Inactive	(Note: Chapter originated as Tau Kappa Phi (local).)
359	Omicron-Psi	May 7, 1977 – 1988	Lakeland University	Sheboygan, Wisconsin	Inactive	
360	Omicron-Omega	May 21, 1977 – 2012	Radford University	Radford, Virginia	Inactive	
361	Pi-Alpha	March 11, 1978 – 2021	Ashland University	Ashland, Ohio	Inactive	
362	**Pi-Beta**	April 1, 1978 – 19xx ?; 1997	Bloomsburg University of Pennsylvania	Bloomsburg, Pennsylvania	Active	
363	Pi-Gamma	May 5, 1979 – 200x ?	East Tennessee State University	Johnson City, Tennessee	Inactive	(Note: The chapter was approved to return to the university in the fall of 2019.)
364	Pi-Delta	May 19, 1979 – 19xx?; 2002–2023	University of Alabama at Birmingham	Birmingham, Alabama	Inactive	
365	**Pi-Epsilon**	January 10, 1981	Christian Brothers University	Memphis, Tennessee	Active	
366	Pi-Zeta	January 24, 1981 – 1988	Auburn University at Montgomery	Montgomery, Alabama	Inactive	
367	**Pi-Eta**	March 28, 1981 – 2001; 2004–20xx ?; 2016	Texas A&M University	College Station, Texas	Active	
368	**Pi-Theta**	April 25, 1981	University of Texas at San Antonio	San Antonio, Texas	Active	
369	**Pi-Iota**	February 13, 1982	University of Nevada, Reno	Reno, Nevada	Active	
370	Pi-Kappa	February 13, 1982 – 1983	Colorado Mesa University	Grand Junction, Colorado	Inactive	
371	**Pi-Lambda**	February 13, 1982	University of Nevada, Las Vegas	Paradise, Nevada	Active	
372	Pi-Mu	April 24, 1982 – 202x ?	Buffalo State University	Buffalo, New York	Inactive	
373	Pi-Nu	March 25, 1983 – 200x ?	Fairleigh Dickinson University	Madison, New Jersey	Inactive	
374	**Pi-Xi**	May 28, 1983	University of California, San Diego	San Diego, California	Active	
375	Pi-Omicron	December 17, 1983 – 2026	Northern Kentucky University	Highland Heights, Kentucky	Inactive	
376	Pi-Pi	April 27, 1984 – 1988	Cameron University	Lawton, Oklahoma	Inactive	
377	Pi-Rho	April 29, 1984 – 20xx ?	Babson College	Wellesley, Massachusetts	Inactive	
378	Pi-Sigma	May 12, 1984 – 199x ?; 2002–2009	Stockton University	Galloway Township, New Jersey	Inactive	(Note: Chapter closed due to violations of university fraternity policies.)
379	Pi-Tau	May 4, 1985 – 19xx ?; 200x ?–2004	Iona College	New Rochelle, New York	Inactive	
380	Pi-Upsilon	May 10, 1985 – 1989; 2002 – March 2016	Towson University	Towson, Maryland	Inactive	(Note: Chapter originated as Beta Sigma Tau Epsilon (local) in 1968. It was suspended by the university and ΤΚΕ Headquarters in March 2016.)
381	Pi-Phi	May 11, 1985 – 200x ?	University of Maine at Presque Isle	Presque Isle, Maine	Inactive	
382	**Pi-Chi**	October 12, 1985 – 200x ?; 2011	Rutgers University–Camden	Camden, New Jersey	Active	
383	Pi-Psi	January 11, 1986 – 200x ?	University of Southern Mississippi	Hattiesburg, Mississippi	Inactive	
384	Pi-Omega	March 15, 1986 – 2018	University at Albany, SUNY	Albany, New York	Inactive	
385	Rho-Alpha	April 19, 1986 – 199x?; 2000–201x ?; 201x ?–2018	Winthrop University	Rock Hill, South Carolina	Inactive	
386	**Rho-Beta**	April 19, 1986 – 199x ?; 199x ?–2006; 2016	Michigan State University	East Lansing, Michigan	Active	
387	Rho-Gamma	April 26, 1986 – 200x ?	University of North Carolina at Greensboro	Greensboro, North Carolina	Inactive	
388	**Rho-Delta**	May 3, 1986 – 199x ?; 2001	California State Polytechnic University, Pomona	Pomona, California	Active	
389	**Rho-Epsilon**	May 10, 1986	Northwood University	Midland, Michigan	Active	
390	Rho-Zeta	May 10, 1986 – 2011	Montclair State University	Montclair, New Jersey	Inactive	
391	**Rho-Eta**	February 18, 1987	Stony Brook University	Stony Brook, New York	Active	
392	**Rho-Theta**	March 14, 1987	Lake Superior State University	Sault Ste. Marie, Michigan	Active	
393	Rho-Iota	April 25, 1987 – 1991	Tarkio College	Tarkio, Missouri	Inactive	(Note: Tarkio College closed in 1992.)
394	Rho-Kappa	April 29, 1987 – 2013	Longwood University	Farmville, Virginia	Inactive	
395	Rho-Lambda	May 2, 1987 – 1997; 2012–202x ?	State University of New York at Oswego	Oswego, New York	Inactive	(Note: Chapter originated as Delta Chi Omega (local) in 1967.)
396	Rho-Mu	May 2, 1987 – 202x ?	Binghamton University	Vestal, New York	Inactive	(Note: Chapter originated as Phi Epsilon Tau (local) in 1982)
397	Rho-Nu	May 9, 1987 – 200x ?	San Francisco State University	San Francisco, California	Inactive	
398	Rho-Xi	May 9, 1987 – 2000	San Jose State University	San Jose, California	Inactive	
399	Rho-Omicron	May 19, 1987 – 199x ?; 199x ?–2019	California Polytechnic State University, San Luis Obispo	San Luis Obispo, California	Inactive	
400	**Rho-Pi**	November 20, 1987 – 20xx ?	University of Rio Grande	Rio Grande, Ohio	Emerging Chapter	(Note: Chapter originated as Alpha Delta Epsilon (local) in 1968.)
401	**Rho-Rho**	December 11, 1987	Sam Houston State University	Huntsville, Texas	Active	
402	Rho-Sigma	December 12, 1987 – 200x ?	Grand Valley State University	Allendale, Michigan	Inactive	
403	**Rho-Tau**	January 10, 1988	University of Michigan–Dearborn	Dearborn, Michigan	Active	
404	**Rho-Upsilon**	March 12, 1988	Franklin College	Franklin, Indiana	Active	
405	Rho-Phi	April 30, 1988 – 200x ?	State University of New York at Cortland	Cortland, New York	Inactive	
406	**Rho-Chi**	April 30, 1988	Lebanon Valley College	Annville Township, Pennsylvania	Active	
407	**Rho-Psi**	May 7, 1988	Millersville University of Pennsylvania	Millersville, Pennsylvania	Active	(Note: Chapter originated as the Wickers (local) in 1947.)
408	**Rho-Omega**	November 12, 1988 – 200x ?; 2008–2018, 202x ?	University of South Carolina	Columbia, South Carolina	Active	(Note: The chapter was approved to return to the university in Spring 2022.)
409	**Sigma-Alpha**	November 12, 1988 – October 2017	Florida International University	Miami, Florida	Emerging Chapter	(Note: In 2006, a member of the chapter was killed in a boating accident. The chapter was suspended in October 2017 until a university investigation was concluded. In February 2018, the university suspended the chapter for two years.)
410	Sigma-Beta	February 25, 1989 – 200x ?	The College at Brockport, State University of New York	Brockport, New York	Inactive	
411	**Sigma-Gamma**	April 1, 1989 – 200x ?; 2012	State University of New York at Plattsburgh	Plattsburgh, New York	Active	
412	Sigma-Delta	April 22, 1989 – 20xx ?	Penn State Erie, The Behrend College	Erie, Pennsylvania	Inactive	
413	**Sigma-Epsilon**	May 6, 1989 – 200x ?; 200x ?–200x ?; 202x ?	State University of New York at Oneonta	Oneonta, New York	Active	
414	Sigma-Zeta	May 20, 1989 – 200x ?; 2008–2023	University of South Carolina Aiken	Aiken, South Carolina	Inactive	
415	Sigma-Eta	June 3, 1989 – 2006	California State University, San Bernardino	San Bernardino, California	Inactive	
416	**Sigma-Theta**	September 16, 1989 – 1994; 2007	Saint Leo University	St. Leo, Florida	Active	
417	Sigma-Iota	March 31, 1990 – 201x ?	Pace University	New York City, New York	Inactive	
418	**Sigma-Kappa**	April 21, 1990	Merrimack College	North Andover, Massachusetts	Active	(Note: The Sigma-Kappa chapter originated as Delta Phi Kappa (local).)
419	**Sigma-Lambda**	April 27, 1990	Northeastern State University	Tahlequah, Oklahoma.	Active	
420	Sigma-Mu	April 28, 1990 – 200x ?	Marquette University	Milwaukee, Wisconsin	Inactive	
421	Sigma-Nu	May 5, 1990 – 202x ?	State University of New York at New Paltz	New Paltz, New York	Inactive	
422	**Sigma-Xi**	May 5, 1990	St. Norbert College	De Pere, Wisconsin	Active	
423	Sigma-Omicron	May 5, 1990 – 2012	Middle Tennessee State University	Murfreesboro, Tennessee	Inactive	
424	Sigma-Pi	September 22, 1990 – 199x ?	Wake Forest University	Winston-Salem, North Carolina	Inactive	
425	Sigma-Rho	December 1, 1990 – 201x ?	Marist College	Poughkeepsie, New York	Inactive	
426	Sigma-Sigma	May 9, 1992 – 2010	Salisbury University	Salisbury, Maryland	Inactive	
427	Sigma-Tau	May 16, 1992 – 200x ?	State University of New York at Geneseo	Geneseo, New York	Inactive	
428	**Sigma-Upsilon**	May 16, 1992	Ramapo College	Mahwah, New Jersey	Active	
429	Sigma-Phi	May 23, 1992 – 2014	Temple University	Philadelphia, Pennsylvania	Inactive	
430	**Sigma-Chi**	May 30, 1992	University of California, Davis	Davis, California	Active	
431	Sigma-Psi	November 12, 1992 – 2026	Clemson University	Clemson, South Carolina	Inactive	
432	Sigma-Omega	January 10, 1993 – 20xx ?	University of Tennessee at Chattanooga	Chattanooga, Tennessee	Inactive	
433	Tau-Alpha	January 9, 1993 – 201x ?	New York University	New York City, New York	Inactive	
434	Tau-Beta	April 1, 1993 – 2019	Sonoma State University	Rohnert Park, California	Inactive	
435	Tau-Gamma	April 25, 1993 – 200x ?	Manhattan University	Bronx, New York City, New York	Inactive	
436	**Tau-Delta**	April 30, 1993	New Jersey City University	Honolulu, Hawaii	Active	
437	**Tau-Epsilon**	May 1, 1993	University of Hawaiʻi at Mānoa	Honolulu, Hawaii	Active	
438	**Tau-Zeta**	May 1, 1993	Western Connecticut State University	Danbury, Connecticut	Active	
439	**Tau-Eta**	May 8, 1993 – 1998; 2007	Southern Connecticut State University	New Haven, Connecticut	Active	
440	**Tau-Theta**	May 15, 1993	Fairleigh Dickinson University–Madison	Madison, New Jersey	Active	
441	Tau-Iota	October 23, 1993 – 200x ?	University of Western Ontario	London, Ontario, Canada	Inactive	
442	Tau-Kappa	November 20, 1993 – 2002	Virginia Commonwealth University	Richmond, Virginia	Inactive	
443	**Tau-Lambda**	March 19, 1994	Kean University	Union Township, New Jersey	Active	
444	Tau-Mu	April 23, 1994 – 2015	Johnson & Wales University	Providence, Rhode Island	Inactive	
445	**Tau-Nu**	May 14, 1994	Shawnee State University	Portsmouth, Ohio	Active	
446	Tau-Xi	October 29, 1994 – 200x ?	Ithaca College	Ithaca, New York	Inactive	
447	Tau-Omicron	May 6, 1995 – 200x ?	St. Thomas University	Miami Gardens, Florida	Inactive	
448	Tau-Pi	December 2, 1995 – 201x ?	Pace University–Manhattan	Manhattan, New York	Inactive	
449	Tau-Rho	December 2, 1996 – 2016	California State University, San Marcos	San Marcos, California	Inactive	(Note: The chapter is active but not officially associated with California State University, San Marcos.)
450	**Tau-Sigma**	April 9, 1997	Francis Marion University	Florence, South Carolina	Active	
451	Tau-Tau	April 18, 1998 – 2014	Coastal Carolina University	Conway, South Carolina	Inactive	(Note: Chapter closed by national fraternity.)
452	Tau-Upsilon	May 16, 1998 – 200x ?; 2013–2023	Louisiana State University Shreveport	Shreveport, Louisiana	Inactive	
453	Tau-Phi	January 10, 1999 – 2025	University of Pittsburgh	Pittsburgh, Pennsylvania	Inactive	
454	Tau-Chi	January 10, 1999 – 202x ?	Carthage College	Kenosha, Wisconsin	Inactive	
455	Tau-Psi	April 29, 2000 – 2017	University of West Florida	Pensacola, Florida	Inactive	
456	Tau-Omega	May 6, 2000 – 202x ?	Carleton University	Ottawa, Ontario, Canada	Inactive	(Note: Chapter originated as Sigma Chi Nu (local) in 1994.)
457	**Upsilon-Alpha**	May 6, 2000	Spring Hill College	Mobile, Alabama	Active	
458	Upsilon-Beta	May 27, 2000 – 2015	California State University, Northridge	Los Angeles, California	Inactive	(Note: The chapter was suspended by the university until July 20, 2018.)
459	**Upsilon-Gamma**	March 24, 2001	University of Minnesota Duluth	Duluth, Minnesota	Active	
460	**Upsilon-Delta**	April 13, 2002	Saginaw Valley State University	University Center, Michigan	Active	
461	Upsilon-Epsilon	May 11, 2002 – 200x ?	West Virginia State University	Institute, West Virginia	Inactive	
462	Upsilon-Zeta	April 24, 2004 – 2020	Angelo State University	San Angelo, Texas	Inactive	
463	**Upsilon-Eta**	April 30, 2005	Ontario Tech University	Oshawa, Ontario, Canada	Active	
464	**Upsilon-Theta**	May 21, 2005	University of Maryland, Baltimore County	Catonsville, Maryland	Active	
465	**Upsilon-Iota**	August 20, 2005	Indiana University Indianapolis	Indianapolis, Indiana	Active	
466	**Upsilon-Kappa**	May 12, 2007	Trent University	Peterborough, Ontario, Canada	Active	
467	**Upsilon-Lambda**	May 3, 2008	College of Staten Island	Staten Island, New York City, New York	Active	(Note: Chapter originated as Delta Tau Omega (local).)
468	Upsilon-Mu	May 30, 2009 – 202x ?	New York Institute of Technology–Manhattan	Manhattan, New York	Inactive	
469	Upsilon-Nu	September 12, 2009 – 20xx ?	University of North Carolina at Chapel Hill	Chapel Hill, North Carolina	Inactive	
470	Upsilon-Xi	May 22, 2010 – 2021	Oakland University	Oakland County, Michigan	Inactive	
471	Upsilon-Omicron	November 20, 2010 – April 2013	American University	Washington, D.C.	Inactive	(Note: Chapter was closed by the national fraternity.)
472	**Upsilon-Pi**	April 28, 2012	University of California, Santa Cruz	Santa Cruz, California	Active	
473	Upsilon-Rho	May 12, 2012 – 2020	Central Methodist University	Fayette, Missouri	Inactive	(Note: Chapter originated as Delta Sigma Psi (local) in 1961.)
474	Upsilon-Sigma	November 3, 2012 – 2019	University of Arkansas at Monticello	Monticello, Arkansas	Inactive	
475	Upsilon-Tau	November 17, 2012 – 202x ?	California State University, Stanislaus	Turlock, California	Inactive	
476	**Upsilon-Upsilon**	February 9, 2013	Farmingdale State College	East Farmingdale, New York	Active	
477	**Upsilon-Phi**	April 6, 2013	State University of New York at Delhi	Delhi, New York	Active	
478	Upsilon-Chi	May 26, 2013 – 2025	St. Francis College	Brooklyn, New York City, New York	Inactive	
479	**Upsilon-Psi**	May 17, 2014	California State University, East Bay	Hayward, California	Active	
480	**Upsilon-Omega**	November 1, 2014	Santa Clara University	Santa Clara, California	Active	
481	**Phi-Alpha**	March 28, 2015	University of Alaska Anchorage	Anchorage, Alaska	Active	
482	**Phi-Beta**	April 15, 2023	The College of New Jersey	Ewing Township, New Jersey	Active	
