= Sheesh! =

2021 single by Surfaces

- Official cover art

Single by Surfaces featuring Tai Verdes

from the album Pacifico (deluxe edition)
- Released: August 20, 2021
- Recorded: 2021
- Genre: Pop
- Length: 2:29
- Label: TenThousand
- Songwriters: Forrest Frank; Colin Padalecki; Kameron Glasper; Tayla Parx
- Producers: Forrest Frank; Colin Padalecki; Medasin

Surfaces singles chronology
| "So Far Away" (2021) | "Sheesh!" (2021) | "C'est La Vie" (2021) |

Tai Verdes singles chronology
| "Feeling This Bad (v2)" (2021) | "Sheesh!" (2021) | "Let's Go to Hell" (2021) |

Music video
- "Sheesh!" (live performance) on YouTube

"Sheesh!" is a 2021 song by the American music group Surfaces, featuring singer Tai Verdes, from the deluxe edition of the group's fourth studio album, Pacifico (2021). The song was recorded at rental accommodation fitted with music production equipment. The music composition is credited to Kameron Glasper and Tayla Parx.

"Sheesh!" was debuted live on July 31, 2021, the night before Surfaces' performance at Lollapalooza, and was released as a single a few weeks later. The song was presented at a time when the phrase "sheesh" was rising in prominence as a slang term with new meaning, as an internet meme and a viral TikTok theme. It charted on the NZ Hot Singles Chart. The song has been used commercially in a variety of ways, including ad campaigns by Toyota and Pizza Hut. The song was certified gold by Recording Industry Association of America on August 30, 2024.

== Background ==
The use of "sheesh" as an expression has a history of popular use on TikTok, and in 2021, the phrase spiked as a viral trend on the platform. This was often in humorous, memetic contexts, as well as being used as an ad-lib in hip-hop performances. The song samples the TikTok meme.

== Production and release ==
Surfaces, a band from College Station, Texas, rented a house fitted with music production equipment in Malibu, California, for two weeks, where they created "Sheesh!" and other songs. The group performed at Lollapalooza on August 1, 2021, which was their first music festival performance. They debuted "Sheesh!" the night before at a smaller venue, but played it for a large audience for the first time at Lollapalooza. This performance was streamed live on Hulu, and the song was subsequently re-streamed 4 million times within 11 days.

The studio version of the song was released on August 21, 2021, as part of Universal Music Canada's New Music Friday release (Universal Music is the parent label of TenThousand Projects, the label which Surfaces signed on to). The song's music video comprises videos of live performances featuring Tai Verdes, filmed at festivals including Lollapalooza before the September 8, 2021, start of their "Good 2 Be Back Tour". "Sheesh!" was included on the deluxe version of Surfaces' fourth album, Pacifico, which was released on August 31, 2021, according to SoundCloud.

On "Sheesh!", Surfaces members Forrest Frank and Colin Padalecki are credited as composers and Tai Verdes is a featured artist, while Kameron Glasper and Tayla Parx have music composer credits. Other credits include Colin Leonard as mastering engineer, Medasin as producer, and Sacco as mixer.

== Reception ==
"Sheesh!" peaked at number 30 on the NZ Hot Singles Chart on August 30, 2021. Despite its lack of commercial success, the song has been described as a "fan favorite".

The staff at The Austin Chronicle, a Central Texas newspaper, noted that Verdes contributes "hooky grandeur and speedy-smooth lines" to the song.

== Use in television ==
In early 2022, Saatchi & Saatchi produced a commercial for that year's Toyota Corolla Cross. The ad, known as "Olympics: Perfect Getaway", featured "Sheesh!" in the background. The commercial aired during the 2022 Winter Olympics. Toyota was still using the song in its commercials as of May 2022.

In late 2022, the song was featured in a Pizza Hut ad campaign, in their "World of Me" and "Hands" commercials. The Pizza Hut commercials, which feature Craig Robinson and Oriana Siphanoum, initially targeted NBC Sunday Night Football, Bachelor in Paradise, and College GameDay audiences, as well as digital channels such as YouTube, TikTok, Snapchat, and Twitch. The "World of Me" commercial was produced by Spark Foundry, GSD&M, and Deutsch NY.

The song has been used in other ads, including a March 2022 Rock County, Wisconsin, public safety community outreach video effort. Additionally, a sample of the song can be heard on a second-season episode of The D'Amelio Show.

== Charts ==
Weekly chart performance for "Sheesh!"
| Chart (2021) | Peak position |
|---|---|
| New Zealand Hot Singles (RMNZ) | 30 |

== Certifications ==
Certifications for "Sheesh!"
| Region | Certification | Certified units/sales |
|---|---|---|
| United States (RIAA) | Gold | 500,000^{‡} |
^{‡} Sales+streaming figures based on certification alone.
