= Coco (24kGoldn song) =

2020 single by 24kGoldn featuring DaBaby

Single by 24kGoldn featuring DaBaby

from the album El Dorado
- Released: December 4, 2020
- Genre: Pop; trap; R&B
- Length: 2:22
- Label: Records; Columbia
- Songwriters: Golden Von Jones; Jonathan Kirk; Jace Jennings; Omer Fedi
- Producers: 94Skrt; Fedi

24kGoldn singles chronology
"I Admit It" (2020)	"Coco" (2020)	"3, 2, 1" (2021)

DaBaby singles chronology
"Nah Nah Nah (Remix)" (2020)	"Coco" (2020)	"Masterpiece" (2021)

Music video
- "Coco" on YouTube

"Coco" is a song by American rapper 24kGoldn featuring fellow American rapper DaBaby, It was released as the second single from 24KGoldn's debut studio album, El Dorado (2021), on December 4, 2020.

== Background and composition ==
24kGoldn announced the song via social media on December 1, 2020. Complex described the song as a fusion of "pop, trap, R&B, and more." The song's title is a reference to fashion brand Chanel.

== Music video ==
The official music video, directed by Cole Bennett, was released on December 16, 2020. The visual sees the two artists in a "winter wonderland" with DaBaby dressed as Santa Claus.

== Personnel ==
Credits adapted from Tidal.

- 24kGoldn – lead vocals, songwriting, lyrics
- DaBaby – featured vocals, songwriting, lyrics
- 94Skrt – songwriting, lyrics, production, drums
- Omer Fedi – songwriting, lyrics, production, guitar
- Chris Galland – assistant engineer
- Jeremie Inhaber – assistant engineer
- Manny Marroquin – mixing engineer
- Robin Florent – mixing engineer

== Charts ==
Chart performance for "Coco"
Chart (2020–2021)	Peak position
Canada Hot 100 (Billboard)	78
Canada CHR/Top 40 (Billboard)	47
Ireland (IRMA)	83
New Zealand Hot Singles (RMNZ)	9
Romania (Airplay 100)	85

== Certifications ==
Certifications for "Coco"
Region	Certification	Certified units/sales
Canada (Music Canada)	Platinum	80,000^{‡}
Hungary (MAHASZ)	Gold	2,000^{‡}
Portugal (AFP)	Gold	5,000^{‡}
United States (RIAA)	Gold	500,000^{‡}
^{‡} Sales+streaming figures based on certification alone.

== Release history ==
Release history for "Coco"
Country	Date	Format	Label	Ref.
Various	December 4, 2020	Digital download; streaming	Records; Columbia	
Italy	February 5, 2021	Contemporary hit radio	Sony	
