= Lil Skies discography =

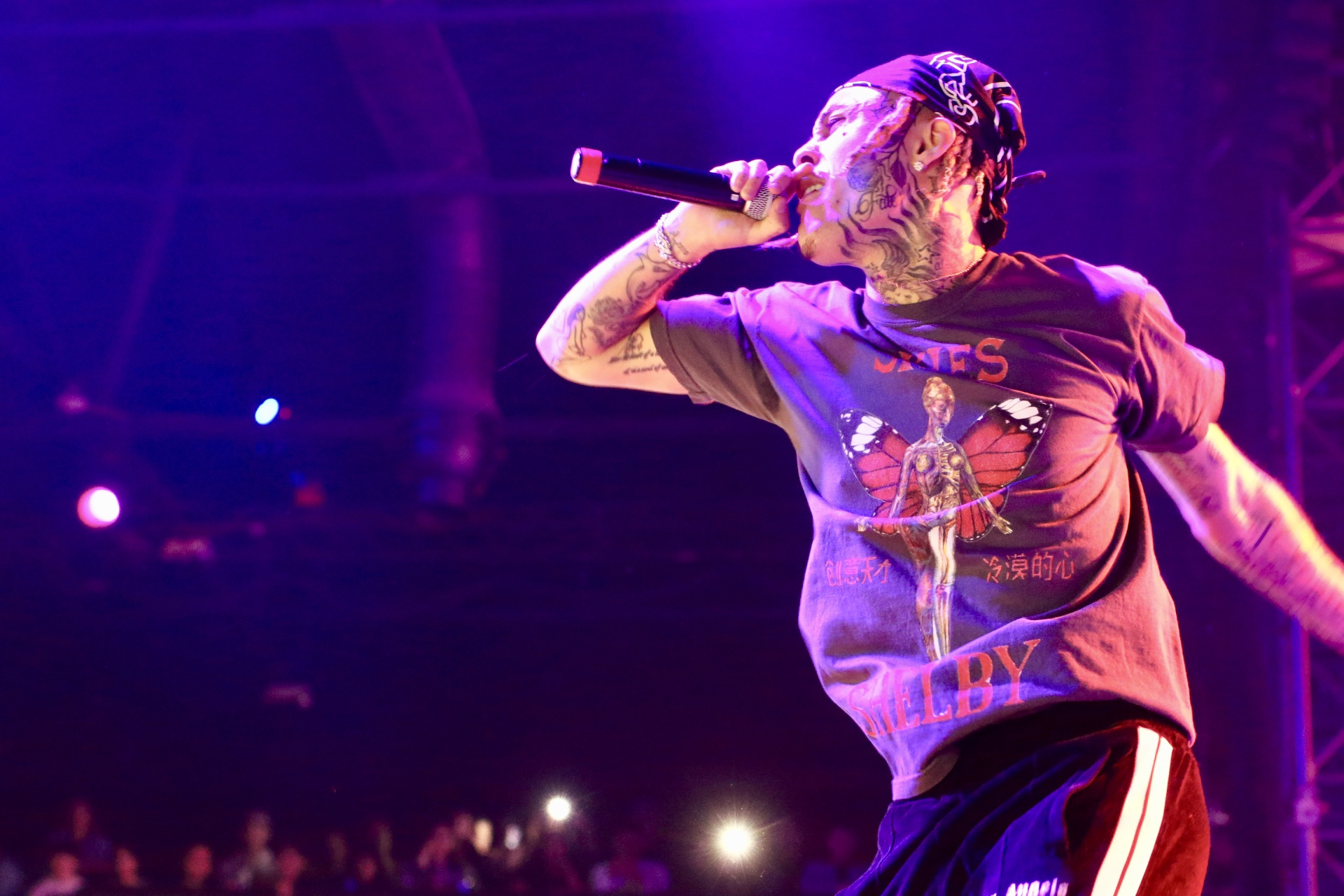
- Lil Skies performing in July 2018.
- Studio albums: 3
- Singles: 73
- Music videos: 63
- Mixtapes: 9

The discography of American rapper Lil Skies consists of three studio albums, nine mixtapes and 73 singles (including 33 as a featured artist).

== Albums ==
=== Studio albums ===
List of studio albums, with selected details, chart positions and certifications
Title	Studio album details	Peak chart positions										Certifications
Title	Studio album details	US	US R&B/HH	US Rap	AUS	BEL (FL)	CAN	NLD	NZ	SWE	UK	Certifications
Shelby	Released: March 1, 2019; Label: All We Got, Atlantic; Format: CD, digital download, streaming	5	2	2	20	57	7	11	21	27	30	RIAA: Gold
Unbothered	Released: January 22, 2021; Label: All We Got, Atlantic; Format: CD, LP, digital download, streaming	50	29	24	—	—	48	—	—	—	—	
The Evolution of the Rose	Released: June 27, 2025; Label: Big Noise Music Group; Format: CD, LP, digital download, streaming	—	—	—	—	—	—	—	—	—	—	
"—" denotes a recording that did not chart or was not released in that territory.

=== Mixtapes ===
List of mixtapes, with selected details, chart positions and certifications
Title	Mixtape details	Peak chart positions				Certifications
Title	Mixtape details	US	US R&B/HH	US Rap	CAN	Certifications
The Freestyles	Released: February 16, 2009; Label: Self-released; Format: CD, digital download, streaming	—	—	—	—	
The Freestyles Vol. 2	Released: December 31, 2009; Label: Self-released; Format: Digital download, streaming	—	—	—	—	
Glowing Microphones	Released: September 22, 2012; Label: Self-released; Format: Digital download, streaming	—	—	—	—	
Father-Son Talk (with Dark Skies)	Released: August 23, 2013; Label: Self-released; Format: Digital download, streaming	—	—	—	—	
Good Grades Bad Habits	Released: September 14, 2015; Label: Self-released; Format: Digital download, streaming	—	—	—	—	
Good Grades Bad Habits 2	Released: February 25, 2016; Label: Self-released; Format: Digital download, streaming	—	—	—	—	
Alone	Released: January 20, 2017; Label: Self-released; Format: Digital download, streaming	—	—	—	—	
Life of a Dark Rose	Released: January 10, 2018; Label: All We Got, Atlantic; Format: CD, LP, digital download, streaming	10	6	8	17	RIAA: Platinum; BPI: Silver; MC: Gold
Out Ur Body Music	Released: March 29, 2024; Label: All We Got; Format: CD, LP, digital download, streaming	—	—	—	—	
"—" denotes a recording that did not chart or was not released in that territory.

== Singles ==
=== As lead artist ===
List of singles, with selected chart positions, showing year released and album name
Title	Year	Peak chart positions						Certifications	Album
Title	Year	US	US R&B /HH	US Rap	CAN	NZ Hot	UK	Certifications	Album
"Red Roses" (featuring Landon Cube)	2017	69	28	24	76	—	—	RIAA: 2× Platinum; BPI: Silver; MC: Platinum	Life of a Dark Rose
"Signs of Jealousy"	2017	—	—	—	—	—	—		Life of a Dark Rose
"Lust"	2017	87	47	—	—	—	—	RIAA: 2× Platinum; BPI: Gold; MC: Platinum	Life of a Dark Rose
"Nowadays" (featuring Landon Cube)	2017	55	22	20	63	—	—	RIAA: 2× Platinum; BPI: Gold; MC: Platinum	Life of a Dark Rose
"Welcome to the Rodeo"	2018	— (Note: "Welcome to the Rodeo" did not enter the Billboard Hot 100, but peaked at number 20 on the Bubbling Under Hot 100 chart.)	—	—	—	—	—	RIAA: Gold; MC: Gold	Life of a Dark Rose
"Creeping" (featuring Rich the Kid)	2018	— (Note: "Creeping" did not enter the Billboard Hot 100, but peaked at number one on the Bubbling Under Hot 100 Singles chart.)	44	—	93	—	—	RIAA: Gold	Non-album singles
"I Know You" (featuring Yung Pinch)	2018	79	40	—	94	—	—	RIAA: Gold	Non-album singles
"Pop Star"	2018	—	—	—	—	—	—		Non-album singles
"World Rage"	2018	—	—	—	—	—	—		Non-album singles
"No Rest"	2018	—	—	—	—	—	—		Non-album singles
"Opps Want Me Dead"	2018	—	—	—	—	—	—		Non-album singles
"Name in the Sand"	2018	—	—	—	—	28	—		Shelby
"Real Ties"	2019	—	—	—	—	—	—		Non-album single
"I"	2019	39	17	15	51	6	93	RIAA: Platinum; BPI: Silver; MC: Gold	Shelby
"Going Off"	2019	—	—	—	—	—	—		Non-album singles
"Magic"	2019	—	—	—	—	—	—		Non-album singles
"More Money More Ice"	2019	—	—	—	—	—	—		Non-album singles
"Havin My Way" (featuring Lil Durk)	2020	— (Note: "Havin My Way" did not enter the Billboard Hot 100, but peaked at number 18 on the Bubbling Under Hot 100 chart.)	—	—	—	28	—	RIAA: Gold	Unbothered
"Fidget"	2020	—	—	—	—	—	—		Non-album single
"Riot"	2020	—	—	—	—	37	—		Unbothered
"Red & Yellow"	2020	—	—	—	—	—	—		Road to F9
"Lightbeam" (featuring NoCap)	2020	—	—	—	—	—	—		Non-album single
"On Sight"	2020	—	—	—	—	—	—		Unbothered
"Ok"	2020	—	—	—	—	—	—		Unbothered
"My Baby" (Note: Only on the deluxe edition of Unbothered) (featuring Zhavia Ward)	2021	—	—	—	—	—	—		Unbothered
"Play This at My Funeral" (featuring Landon Cube)	2022	—	—	—	—	—	—		Non-album singles
"Rage!"	2022	—	—	—	—	—	—		Non-album singles
"Make a Toast"	2023	—	—	—	—	—	—		Non-album singles
"Base"	2023	—	—	—	—	—	—		Non-album singles
"How Things Go"	2023	—	—	—	—	—	—		Non-album singles
"Wake Up"	2023	—	—	—	—	—	—		Non-album singles
"M.O.M!"	2023	—	—	—	—	—	—		Non-album singles
"Out My Way"	2023	—	—	—	—	—	—		Non-album singles
"Thousands"	2024	—	—	—	—	—	—		Out Ur Body Music
"Death"	2024	—	—	—	—	—	—		Out Ur Body Music
"Runnin Through the Fire"	2024	—	—	—	—	—	—		Non-album singles
"Pain"	2024	—	—	—	—	—	—		Non-album singles
"High Maintenance"	2025	—	—	—	—	—	—		Non-album singles
"2Much 2Fast" (featuring Landon Cube)	2025	—	—	—	—	—	—		The Evolution of The Rose
"Falling Backwards"	2025	—	—	—	—	—	—		The Evolution of The Rose
"Monster" (featuring Landon Cube)	2025	—	—	—	—	—	—		Non-album singles
"Make A Wish"	2026	—	—	—	—	—	—		Non-album singles
"No Fear"	2026	—	—	—	—	—	—		Non-album singles
"3rd Eye"	2026	—	—	—	—	—	—		Non-album singles
"—" denotes a recording that did not chart or was not released in that territory.

=== As featured artist ===
List of songs, with selected chart positions and certifications, showing year released and album name
Title	Year	Peak chart positions				Certifications	Album
Title	Year	US	US R&B	CAN	NZ Hot	Certifications	Album
"Ice" (Choo Jackson featuring Lil Skies)	2016	—	—	—	—		Pray 4 The Best
"Lavagirl" (Sprite Lee featuring Lil Skies)	2017	—	—	—	—		Non-album single
"Lonely" (Note: Also appears on the EP Yung Bans Vol.2) (Yung Bans featuring Lil Skies)	2017	—	—	—	—	RIAA: Gold	Yung Bans
"Now" (Suigeneris featuring Lil Skies)	2018	—	—	—	—		Non-album single
"LilSkiesFuneral" (Wifisfuneral featuring Lil Skies)	2018	—	—	—	—		Ethernet
"Off the Gas" (6 Dogs featuring Lil Skies)	2018	—	—	—	—		Non-album single
"Drop Top Benz" (Lil Gnar featuring Lil Skies)	2018	—	—	—	—		Gnar Lif3
"Moving On" (Global Dan featuring Lil Skies)	2018	—	—	—	—		Non-album single
"Fr Fr" (Wiz Khalifa featuring Lil Skies)	2018	73	31	89	—	RIAA: Gold	Rolling Papers II
"Lies" (Lil Xan featuring Lil Skies)	2018	—	—	—	—		Non-album single
"Celebrate" (Hoodrich Pablo Juan and Danny Wolf featuring Lil Skies)	2018	—	—	—	—		Hoodwolf 2
"Side Swipe" (Kamrin Houser featuring Lil Skies)	2018	—	—	—	—		All of Me
"Rockstar" (Lil Durk featuring Lil Skies)	2018	—	—	—	—		Signed to the Streets 3
"Meds" (Ybs Skola featuring Lil Skies)	2018	—	—	—	—		Only Hope 3
"Nightmares" (Yung Pinch featuring Lil Skies)	2019	—	—	—	—		Non-album singles
"Let Me See" (Juicy J featuring Lil Skies and Kevin Gates)	2019	—	—	—	—		Non-album singles
"Heartbreaker" (The Drip featuring Lil Skies)	2019	—	—	—	—		Mood
"I Like Girls" (PnB Rock featuring Lil Skies)	2019	— (Note: "I Like Girls" did not enter the Billboard Hot 100, but peaked at number seven on the Bubbling Under Hot 100 Singles chart.)	48	—	39	RIAA: Gold	TrapStar Turnt PopStar
"Death Note" (Lil Gnar featuring Lil Skies and Craig Xen)	2019	—	—	—	—	RIAA: Gold	Fire Hazard
"17" (Landon Cube featuring Lil Skies)	2019	—	—	—	—		Orange
"Carrie" (Landon Cube featuring Lil Skies)	2019	—	—	—	—		Non-album single
"Dirty Dirty" (Smokepurpp featuring Lil Skies)	2019	—	—	—	37		Deadstar 2
"G-Code" (Kamrin Houser featuring Lil Skies)	2021	—	—	—	—		Non-album single
"Not the Same" (Lil Gnar featuring Lil Skies)	2021	—	—	—	—		Die Bout It
"Whipski" ($not featuring Lil Skies and Internet Money)	2021	— (Note: "Whipski" did not enter the Billboard Hot 100, but peaked at number 25 on the Bubbling Under Hot 100 chart.)	—	—	13		Non-album single
"IOD" (Token and YKD Jah featuring Lil Skies)	2021	—	—	—	—		Pink is Better
"Style" (Sprite Lee featuring Lil Skies)	2022	—	—	—	—		Non-album single
"Deep End" (Bankrol Hayden featuring Lil Skies)	2022	—	—	—	—		29
"GB Pre$$i" (Bry Greatah featuring Lil Skies)	2023	—	—	—	—		Non-album singles
"Givenchy" (Apel8 featuring Lil Skies)	2024	—	—	—	—		Non-album singles
"Dash" (Lil Baddg featuring Lil Skies and YBN Nahmir)	2024	—	—	—	—		Non-album singles
"Counter-Strike" (Apel8 featuring Lil Skies)	2024	—	—	—	—		Nuka-Cola
"Pull the Trigger" (Masked Wolf featuring Lil Skies)	2024	—	—	—	—		The Devil Wears Prada; But God Wears Gucci
"—" denotes a recording that did not chart or was not released in that territory.

== Guest appearances ==
List of non-single guest appearances, with other performing artists
Title	Year	Other artist(s)	Album
"Gtfu"	2016	C-Trox	5 Reasons to Party
"Battlescars"	2018	Pollari	Lil Jesus
"Think Twice"	2018	YBN Nahmir, Almighty Jay	YBN: The Mixtape
"Grave"	2018	Lil Gnar	Gnar Lif3
"Mad Russian"	2018	Gucci Mane	Evil Genius
"Waterslide"	2018	Yung Bans	Yung Bans
"Checkmate"	2019	Sprite Lee	Super 8
"Burning Memories"	2019	Machine Gun Kelly	Hotel Diablo
"Feel the Vibe"	2019	Danny Wolf	Dark Nights In Paradise
"Broken (Remix)"	2020	Lund, Noah Cyrus	Non-album remix
"Lost Me"	2020	Internet Money, Lil Mosey, Iann Dior	B4 The Storm
"Run it Back"	2021	Bry Greatah	The Wait is Over
"Feel My Pain"	2023	Tana Too Official	Sorry I’m Too Turnt
"This My Life"	2024	Lyrical Lemonade, Lil Tecca, The Kid Laroi	All Is Yellow
"Halo"	2025	Iann Dior	Nothing's Ever Good Enough II
"Playboy Party"	2025	Yung Pinch	I Would Hate Me Too
"Till The End"	2026	Cel NoLackin	The Kid, Who Did
"Sensei"	2026	Mightyy!	Mightyy!

== Other charted and certified songs ==
Title	Year	Peak chart positions			Certifications	Album
Title	Year	US Bub.	US R&B /HH	NZ Hot	Certifications	Album
"Cloudy Skies"	2018	—	—	—	RIAA: Gold	Life of a Dark Rose
"Bad Girls" (featuring Gucci Mane)	2019	9	50	16		Shelby
"Nowadays Pt. 2" (featuring Landon Cube)	2019	—	—	25		Shelby
"Breathe"	2019	—	—	31		Shelby
"Lost Me" (Internet Money, Lil Mosey, Iann Dior featuring Lil Skies)	2020	—	—	28		B4 the Storm
"This My Life" (Lyrical Lemonade featuring Lil Tecca, The Kid Laroi and Lil Skies)	2024	19	49	20		All Is Yellow
"—" denotes a recording that did not chart or was not released in that territory.

== Music videos ==
Year	Title	Release date	Director	Artist(s)
As lead artist
2013	"Live 4 the Moment"	June 16, 2013	Skies	Dark Skies (his dad)
2016	"Da Sauce"	March 25, 2016	Nicholas Jandora	—N/a
2017	"Some Way"	April 18, 2017	Nicholas Jandora	—N/a
2017	"Rude"	July 11, 2017	Nicholas Jandora	—N/a
2017	"Signs of Jealousy"	November 14, 2017	Nicholas Jandora	—N/a
2017	"Fake"	January 25, 2017	Nicholas Jandora	—N/a
2017	"Red Roses"	October 19, 2017	Cole Bennett	Landon Cube
2017	"Nowadays"	December 18, 2017	Cole Bennett	Landon Cube
2018	"Lettuce Sandwich"	February 1, 2018	Nicholas Jandora	—N/a
2018	"Welcome to the Rodeo"	March 29, 2018	Cole Bennett	—N/a
2018	"Lust"	May 3, 2018	Nicholas Jandora	—N/a
2018	"I Know You"	May 31, 2018	Nicholas Jandora	Yung Pinch
2018	"Creeping"	July 9, 2018	Cole Bennett	Rich the Kid
2019	"Real Ties"	January 17, 2019	Xandros	—N/a
2019	"Name In The Sand"	January 31, 2019	Nicholas Jandora	—N/a
2019	"Breathe"	May 20, 2019	Nicholas Jandora	—N/a
2019	"Going Off"	July 18, 2019	Louieknows	—N/a
2019	"I"	March 1, 2019	Cole Bennett	—N/a
2019	"Stop The Madness"	March 18, 2019	Sara Lacombe	Gunna
2019	"More Money More Ice"	September 6, 2019	Cole Bennet	—N/a
2020	"Havin My Way"	March 4, 2020	Astroknot and Nick Tabidze	Lil Durk
2020	"Fidget"	April 20, 2020	Kristian Bennese	—N/a
2020	"Riot"	May 14, 2020	LOUIEKNOWS	—N/a
2020	"Lightbeam"	July 23, 2020	Nicholas Jandora	NoCap
2020	"On Sight"	November 6, 2020	Kristian Bennese	—N/a
2020	"OK"	December 16, 2020	STRIPMALL	—N/a
2021	"Dead Broke"	January 22, 2021	Nicholas Jandora	—N/a
2021	"Take 5"	March 22, 2021	Bobby Lee Palmer	—N/a
2022	"Play This at My Funeral"	March 25, 2022	Nicholas Jandora	Landon Cube
2022	"RAGE!"	October 21, 2022	Sam McGrath	—N/a
2023	"Make A Toast"	February 21, 2023	Sam McGrath	—N/a
2023	"Base"	May 19, 2023	Sam McGrath	—N/a
2023	"How Things Go"	July 7, 2023	Sam McGrath	—N/a
2023	"Wake Up"	August 4, 2023	Tanner Hench	—N/a
2023	"Out My Way"	October 13, 2023	Nicholas Jandora	—N/a
2024	"Thousands"	March 7, 2024	Tanner Hench	—N/a
2024	"Runnin Thru The Fire"	July 2, 2024	Tanner Hench	—N/a
2024	"Pain"	July 5, 2024	Tanner Hench	—N/a
2025	"High Maintenance"	January 10, 2025	Tanner Hench	—N/a
2025	"2Much 2Fast"	February 28, 2025	Nicholas Jandora	Landon Cube
2025	"Falling Backwards"	June 2, 2025	Andrew Edward P.	—N/a
2025	"Burn"	June 27, 2025	Nicholas Jandora	Landon Cube
2025	"Benjis"	July 10, 2025	Tanner Hench	—N/a
2025	"My Anxiety"	September 18, 2025	Tanner Hench	—N/a
2026	"Make A Wish"	April 10, 2026	Tanner Hench & Himself	—N/a
2026	"No Fear"	May 1, 2026	Tanner Hench	—N/a
2026	"Chaos"	September 9, 2026	Tanner Hench	—N/a
As featured artist
2017	"Lavagirl"	January 4, 2017	Nicholas Jandora	Sprite Lee
2017	"Lonely"	December 26, 2017	Cole Bennett	Yung Bans
2018	"Side Swipe"	May 8, 2018	Nicholas Jandora	Kamrin Houser
2018	"Moving On"	June 15, 2018	Unknown	Global Dan
2018	"Fr fr"	September 18, 2018	Cole Bennett	Wiz Khalifa
2018	"Now"	October 16, 2018	Nicholas Jandora	Suigeneris
2018	"Rockstar"	October 26, 2018	JerryPHD	Lil Durk
2018	"Grave"	October 31, 2018	Nicholas Jandora	Lil Gnar
2019	"Nightmares"	January 23, 2019	MikeDiva	Yung Pinch
2019	"Let Me See"	February 15, 2019	Psycho Films	Juicy J and Kevin Gates
2019	"I Like Girls"	March 21, 2019	Majik Films	PnB Rock
2019	"Death Note"	June 4, 2019	Cole Bennett	Lil Gnar and Craig Xen
2019	"17"	July 11, 2019	Nicholas Jandora	Landon Cube
2019	"Dirty Dirty"	November 22, 2019	Kenneth Cappello	Smokepurpp
2021	"Not The Same"	April 2, 2021	Highdeas	Lil Gnar
2021	"Whipski"	April 9, 2021	Cole Bennett	$not
2021	"IOD"	December 9, 2021	Ben Proulx and Token	Token
2022	"Style"	May 20, 2022	Kristian Bennese	Sprite Lee
2022	"Deep End"	July 18, 2022	JakeTheShooter	Bankrol Hayden
2023	"GB Pre$$i"	May 14, 2023	TH Media	Bry Greatah
2023	"Feel My Pain"	June 20, 2023	Unknown	Tana Too Official
2024	"This My Life"	February 15, 2024	Cole Bennett	Lyrical Lemonade, Lil Tecca, The Kid Laroi
2026	"Till The End"	September 9, 2026	Tanner Hench	Cel NoLackin
