= Plano High School (Illinois) =

Location
- 704 W. Abe St. Plano, Illinois 60545; United States; 41.6658°N 88.5468°W

Information
- School type: Public high school
- Motto: Strive for Excellence
- School district: Plano Community Unit School District #88
- Principal: Mark Heller
- Faculty: 53.19 (on FTE basis)
- Grades: 9 to 12
- Enrollment: 786 (2023-2024)
- Student to teacher ratio: 14.78
- Colors: Purple; White
- Mascot: Reaper
- Website: School Website

Plano High School is a public high school in Plano, Illinois, serving students in grades 9–12. The school is part of the Plano Community Unit School District #88. This school had an average ACT score of 18.8 in 2013, and had 44 percent of students meeting or exceeding standards on the PSAE.

As of the 2011–2012 school year, the school had an enrollment of 619 students and 44.66 classroom teachers (on an FTE basis), for a student-teacher ratio of 1:13.86.

Plano High school was the filming location of the music video of Lil Skies' and Landon Cube's hit single, "Nowadays", shot and filmed by Cole Bennett.

== History ==
Due to high population growth rates in Plano, an addition was built in 2007–2008 to alleviate overcrowding.

In the fall of 2010, principal William Johnson announced his retirement after serving as principal for seven years. In the spring of 2010, it was announced that Eric M. Benson would take over the position.

== Plano-Sandwich rivalry ==
The high schools in the neighboring cities of Plano and Sandwich have an historic rivalry. The two are members of the same conference, the Kishwaukee River Conference. The rivalry game has garnered names such as the "War of the Line" and the "War on 34" due to the location of US 34 passing through the communities and Sandwich's municipal limits coming into Kendall County, where Plano is also located.

== Schedule ==
Plano high school operates on a 8:20 a.m. to 3:15 p.m. schedule.

== Extracurricular activities ==
Plano currently has chapters of organizations such as the National Honor Society, the International Thespian Troupe #1535, and Operation Snowball.

=== Athletics ===
Plano's teams compete in the Interstate Eight Conference through the Illinois High School Association (IHSA).

In 2012, there was a rape incident regarding five students.

==== Football ====
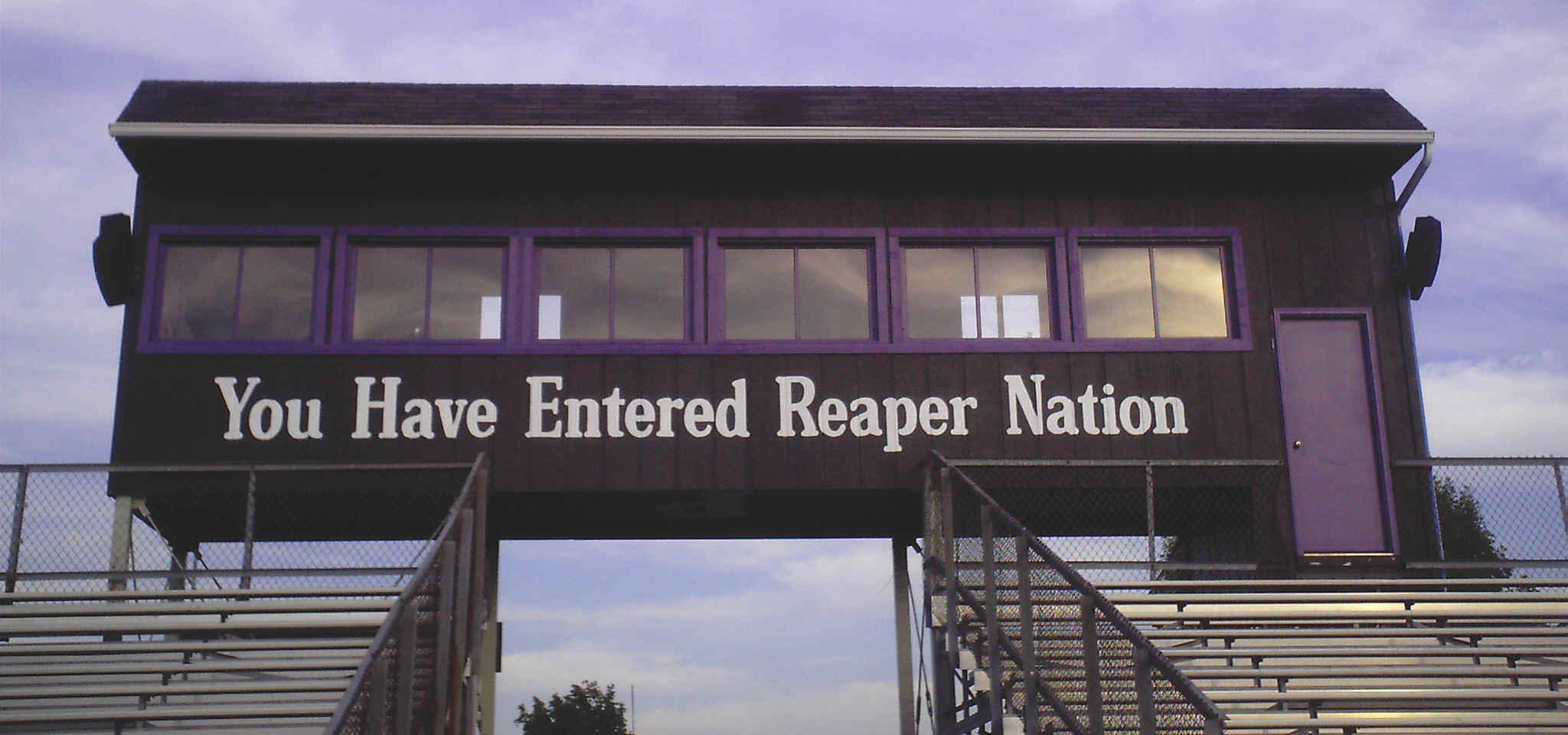
Pressbox

The Plano Varsity football team has competed in, and won, two IHSA state championships, in 2006 and 2007.

==== Basketball ====
The Plano boys' basketball team hosts the Plano Christmas Classic basketball tournament annually in late December.

== Notable alumni ==
- Joseph Jones, linebacker for NFL's Tennessee Titans
- Cole Bennett, founder of Lyrical Lemonande
