= I Know You Know (disambiguation) =

I Know You Know is a film.

I Know You Know may also refer to:

- "I Know You Know", a song from the album BTR by Big Time Rush
- I Know, You Know (Psych), the theme song of the television series Psych by The Friendly Indians
- I Know You Know, the 1974 debut album by Meg Christian
- "I Know U Know", a song by Basshunter from Bass Generation
- "I Know You Know", a song from the show Produce 101
- "I Know, You Know", a song by Gotthard from Need to Believe
- "I Know You Know", a song by Esperanza Spalding from Esperanza
- "I Know U Know", a song by Zerobaseone from Never Say Never

== See also ==
- I Know You (disambiguation)
