= The Evolution of the Rose =

The Evolution of The Rose

Studio album by Lil Skies
- Released: June 27, 2025
- Recorded: 2022–2025
- Genres: Hip hop; rap; alternative rock; emo rap
- Length: 36:08
- Label: Big Noise Music Group
- Producers: CashMoneyAP; John Feldmann; Nash Beats; Nick Mira; RJ Pasin; Travis Barker; Tyler Made It; Zerby

Lil Skies chronology
Out Ur Body Music (2024)	The Evolution of The Rose (2025)

Singles from The Evolution of The Rose
- 1. "2Much 2Fast" Released: 28 February 2025; 2. "Falling Backwards" Released: 11 April 2025

The Evolution of The Rose is the third studio album by American rapper Lil Skies and acts as a sequel to his 2018 mixtape Life of a Dark Rose. It was released on June 27, 2025, by Big Noise Music Group. The album features guest appearances from Landon Cube and Ravenna Golden. It follows his previous album Unbothered (2021).

== Background ==
Skies first started teasing a sequel to Life of a Dark Rose as early as 2022, posting an Instagram story asking whether fans wanted a sequel. Life of a Dark Rose 2 never released due to label issues. Skies would announce his parting with Atlantic Records in February 2023. Skies wouldn't touch on a sequel album until he announced the title of The Evolution of The Rose in June 2025 via Instagram. In a post announcing the pre sale, Skies announced a fan favourite snippet "Ganja" would be released as part of the album.

== Singles ==
The lead single "2Much 2Fast", featuring Landon Cube, was released on February 28, 2025. The song adopted a new Pop Rock/Rap style sound. A music video was released on the same day, directed by Nicholas Jandora. As of June 2025 the video has 1.2 Million views.

The second single "Falling Backwards" was released April 11, 2025, this song too followed in the pop rock/rap sound. A music video was released on June 2, directed by Andrew Edward P. and featured a cameo from John Feldmann.

== Track listing ==
The Evolution of The Rose track listing
No.	Title	Writer(s)	Producer(s)	Length
1.	"Sick and Tired"	Kimetrius Foose; John Feldmann	John Feldmann	2:29
2.	"Burn" (featuring Landon Cube)	Foose; Landon Cube; Feldmann	John Feldmann	2:48
3.	"Ganja"	Foose; Alex Petit	CashMoneyAP	2:48
4.	"2Much 2Fast" (featuring Landon Cube)	Foose; Cube; Feldmann	John Feldmann	2:37
5.	"My Anxiety"	Foose; Nathan Lamarche; Nicholas Mira	Nash Beats; Nick Mira	2:26
6.	"The Loners"	Foose; Travis Barker; Feldmann	Travis Barker; John Feldmann	2:16
7.	"Falling Backwards"	Foose; Feldmann; RJ Pasin	John Feldmann; RJ Pasin	2:05
8.	"Window Down"	Foose; Mira	Nick Mira	2:59
9.	"Bright Side"	Foose; Feldmann	John Feldmann	2:27
10.	"Xs and Os"	Foose; Feldmann	John Feldmann	2:32
11.	"Chaos"	Foose; Zerby	Zerby	3:01
12.	"Wildfire" (featuring Ravenna Golden)	Foose; Ravenna Golden; Feldmann	John Feldmann	2:31
13.	"Renegade"	Foose; Feldmann	John Feldmann	1:53
14.	"Benjis"	Foose; Zerby; Tyler Made It	Zerby; Tyler Made It	3:10
Total length:				36:08
