= Play This at My Funeral =

Single by Lil Skies featuring Landon Cube

Single by Lil Skies featuring Landon Cube
- Released: March 25, 2022
- Genre: Emo rap
- Length: 3:06
- Label: All We Got; Atlantic
- Songwriters: Kimetrius Foose; Landon Cube; John Luther; Nathan Lamarche; Nick Mira
- Producers: Nick Mira; John Luther; Nathan Lamarche

Lil Skies singles chronology
"IOD" (2022)	"Play This at My Funeral" (2022)	"Style" (2022)

Landon Cube singles chronology
"2Fast" (2022)	"Play This at My Funeral" (2022)	"Gone" (2022)

"Play This at My Funeral" is a song by American rapper and singer Lil Skies featuring frequent collaborator Landon Cube. The song was released on March 25, 2022, and was produced by Nick Mira, John Luther and Nathan Lamarche.

== Background ==
"Play This at My Funeral" marks the first collaboration between Skies and Cube since 2019 on the latter's debut album, Shelby, on the song "Nowadays Pt.2".

== Music video ==
The music video depicts Skies and Cube in a church and graveyard rapping about beloved ones not coming to their funeral.
