= Welcome to the Rodeo =

Single by Lil Skies

Single by Lil Skies

from the album Life of a Dark Rose
- Released: January 10, 2018
- Genre: Hip hop
- Length: 2:49
- Label: All We Got; Atlantic
- Songwriters: Kimetrius Foose; Danny Snodgrass, Jr.
- Producer: Taz Taylor

Lil Skies singles chronology
"Now" (2018)	"Welcome to the Rodeo" (2018)	"LilSkiesFuneral" (2018)

Music video
- "Welcome to the Rodeo" on YouTube

"Welcome to the Rodeo" is a song by American rapper Lil Skies from his mixtape Life of a Dark Rose. It was produced by Taz Taylor.

== Composition ==
Jordan Sargent of Spin described the song as gathering "intoxicating, careening momentum as Skies unravels his origin story", with Skies rapping in a confident manner over a "darting, subterranean beat".

== Music video ==
A music video for the song was released on March 29, 2018. Directed by Cole Bennett, it pays homage to the music video of "A Milli" by Lil Wayne. It follows Lil Skies interacting with fans while accompanied by a security guard. He is taken photos, and makes his way to a convertible as a crowd of fans dances behind him, and drives off.

== Charts ==
Chart (2018)	Peak position
US Bubbling Under Hot 100 Singles	20

== Certifications ==
Region	Certification	Certified units/sales
Canada (Music Canada)	Gold	40,000^{‡}
United States (RIAA)	Gold	500,000^{‡}
^{‡} Sales+streaming figures based on certification alone.
