= 17 (Zhavia Ward EP) =

2019 EP by Zhavia Ward

EP by Zhavia
- Released: June 14, 2019
- Genre: R&B; soul
- Length: 17:33
- Label: Columbia; Sony
- Producer: Hit-Boy; Swagg R'Celious; Cody Tarpley; Supa Dups; Oak

Singles from 17
- 1. "Candlelight" Released: July 26, 2018; 2. "Deep Down" Released: August 30, 2018; 3. "100 Ways" Released: December 12, 2018; 4. "17" Released: May 31, 2019

17 is the debut extended play (EP) by American R&B singer-songwriter Zhavia Ward. It was released on June 14, 2019, by record labels Columbia Records and Sony Music. 17 follows Ward's appearance on Fox reality television series The Four: Battle for Stardom, where she placed as one of the four finalists. In May 2019, Ward was featured on the soundtrack album Aladdin (2019), performing a version of the song "A Whole New World" with English musician Zayn.

== Track listing ==
| No. | Title | Writer(s) | Producer(s) | Length |
|---|---|---|---|---|
| 1. | "17" | Carisa Zhavia Ward; Chauncey Alexander Hollis; Dustin Corbett; Samuel Elliot Roman | Hit-Boy; Corbett^{[a]}; Cody Tarpley^{[b]} | 2:45 |
| 2. | "Deep Down" | Ward; D. Arcelious Harris; Elijah Bliss Dias; Guy Hershko; Jenna Andrews; Maxx Moore; Billy Foster; Ellington Jordan; Etta James | Swagg R'Celious | 2:58 |
| 3. | "Candlelight" | Ward; Tarpley; Joseph Somers-Morales; Ronald Allen Jr. | Tarpley | 3:09 |
| 4. | "All I Am" (featuring Skip Marley) | Ward; Marley; Ashante Reid; Dwayne Chin-Quee; Jason Arthur Farmer; Mitchum Khan Chin; Stephen David McGregor | Supa Dups | 3:25 |
| 5. | "EZ" | Ward; Hollis; Andrews; Darhyl Camper; Paul Edwin Shelton | Hit-Boy | 2:29 |
| 6. | "100 Ways" | Ward; Shelton; Alexandra Shungudzo Govere; Trevor David Brown; Warren Okay Felder III; William Zaïre Simmons | Oak; Brown^{[a]}; Zaïre Kaolo^{[a]} | 2:47 |
| Total length: | | | | 17:33 |

Notes

- ^{^[a]} signifies a co-producer
- ^{^[b]} signifies a vocal producer
- "Deep Down" contains a sample of "I'd Rather Go Blind", written by Bill Foster, Ellington Jordan and Etta James, and performed by James
