= Joseph Jones (American football) =

American football player (born 1994)

Joe Jones
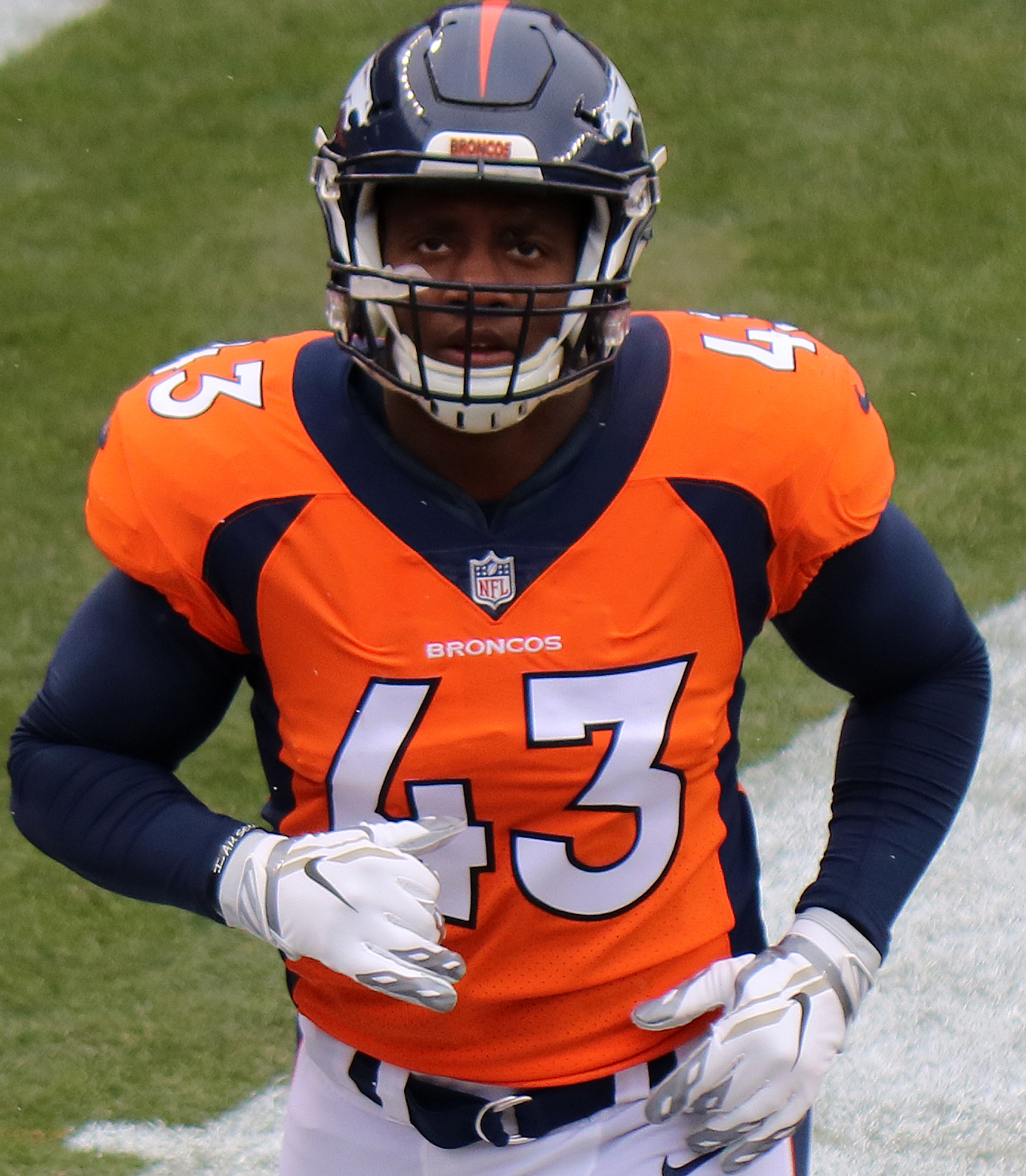
- Jones with the Denver Broncos in 2017

Profile
- Position: Linebacker

Personal information
- Born: February 21, 1994 (age 32); Plano, Illinois, U.S.
- Listed height: 6 ft 0 in (1.83 m)
- Listed weight: 240 lb (109 kg)

Career information
- High school: Plano
- College: Northwestern (2012–2016)
- NFL draft: 2017: undrafted

Career history
- Dallas Cowboys (2017)*; Los Angeles Chargers (2017)*; Seattle Seahawks (2017)*; Denver Broncos (2017–2020); Tampa Bay Buccaneers (2021)*; Tennessee Titans (2021–2023)
- * Offseason or practice squad member only

Career NFL statistics as of 2023
- Total tackles: 57
- Stats at Pro Football Reference

Joseph Edwin Jones (born February 21, 1994) is an American professional football linebacker. He played college football at Northwestern.

== Early life ==
Jones began playing football in the eighth grade at the insistence of his mother. He attended Plano High School, where he was an All-conference running back as a senior. He played with a broken bone in his right hand, collecting 710 rushing yards, 8 rushing touchdowns, 11 receptions for 328 yards and 5 touchdowns in eight games.

He also practiced track and basketball, winning a state championship in the 110 metres hurdles as a senior.

== College career ==
Jones accepted a football scholarship from Northwestern University. He was converted into a linebacker as a freshman and had only 6 tackles after his first 2 seasons, playing almost exclusively on special teams. As a junior, he appeared in 13 games, making 18 tackles (14 solo) and one sack.

He became a starter at linebacker as a fifth year senior, playing most of the season with a broken right thumb and his hand and wrist in a cast. He appeared in 13 games (5 starts), while posting 43 tackles, 2 sacks, 2 passes defensed, 3.5 tackles for loss and one fumble recovery. He finished his college career after appearing in 37 games (5 starts), recording 70 tackles (44 solo), 3 sacks, 2 passes defensed and one fumble recovery.

== Professional career ==
Pre-draft measurables
Height	Weight	Arm length	Hand span	40-yard dash	10-yard split	20-yard split	20-yard shuttle	Three-cone drill	Vertical jump	Broad jump	Bench press
5 ft 11 3/4 in (1.82 m)	231 lb (105 kg)	31 1/2 in (0.80 m)	8 1/2 in (0.22 m)	4.50 s	1.63 s	2.60 s	4.22 s	6.83 s	35.0 in (0.89 m)	10 ft 3 in (3.12 m)	18 reps
All values from Pro Day

=== Dallas Cowboys ===
Jones was signed as an undrafted free agent by the Dallas Cowboys after the 2017 NFL draft on May 12, because his pro day workout would have placed him near the top of the linebackers participating at the NFL Scouting Combine. He was waived on September 2.

=== Los Angeles Chargers ===
On September 4, 2017, Jones was signed to the Los Angeles Chargers' practice squad, but was released two days later.

=== Seattle Seahawks ===
On September 19, 2017, Jones was signed to the Seattle Seahawks' practice squad.

=== Denver Broncos ===
On November 7, 2017, Jones was signed by the Denver Broncos off the Seahawks' practice squad to replace linebacker Kevin Snyder. He appeared in 7 games, playing mainly on special teams.

Jones re-signed with the Broncos on a one-year contract on March 27, 2020.

=== Tampa Bay Buccaneers ===
On May 5, 2021, Jones signed with the Tampa Bay Buccaneers. He was waived on August 31, 2021.

=== Tennessee Titans ===
On September 13, 2021, Jones was signed to the Tennessee Titans' practice squad. He was promoted to the active roster on October 8, 2021. He was waived on January 4, 2022 and re-signed to the practice squad. After the Titans were eliminated in the Divisional Round of the 2021 playoffs, he signed a reserve/future contract on January 24, 2022.

On August 30, 2022, Jones was waived by the Titans and signed to the practice squad the next day. He was promoted to the active roster on September 12, 2022.

On October 24, 2023, Jones was signed to the Tennessee Titans practice squad. He was promoted to the active roster on December 2.

== Personal life ==
Jones married in college and became a father to a daughter in 2016 and again in 2018. He had three part-time jobs during the offseason, two as an exercise trainer and occasionally delivering flowers.
