= Comethazine the Album =

2021 album by Comethazine

Studio album by Comethazine
- Released: October 22, 2021
- Genre: Gangsta rap; Soundcloud rap; Hip-hop; Trap
- Length: 32:52
- Label: Alamo
- Producer: St00pid99; 1Jayem; Toom; David Morse; Danny Wolf; Sredna; div; ProdByAlien; Quay Global; 808iden; Melee Beats; Bobby Johnson Beats; ICEDOUTRAY; Kriime; ChildBoy

Comethazine chronology
Bawskee 4 (2020)	Comethazine the Album (2021)	Bawskee 5 (2022)

Singles from Comethazine the Album
- 1. "Spinback" Released: September 15, 2021; 2. "Six Flags" Released: October 20, 2021

Comethazine the Album is the second studio album by American rapper Comethazine, released on October 22, 2021, by Alamo Records.

Professional ratings
Review scores
Source	Rating
Allmusic	3/5 stars

== Track listing ==
Comethazine the Album track listing
No.	Title	Length
1.	"No Hype"	1:41
2.	"God's Schedule"	1:37
3.	"Hallla"	1:55
4.	"Lord"	1:23
5.	"Solar Freestyle"	3:25
6.	"Six Flags"	2:03
7.	"Wake Up" (2016 unreleased)	2:38
8.	"Spinback"	1:45
9.	"Balls to the Wall"	1:40
10.	"4 Deep"	1:43
11.	"I Been Loved Guns"	2:01
12.	"So You Say You a Gangsta"	1:39
13.	"SK Music"	1:16
14.	"Buffed Up"	2:13
15.	"Pimps in the House"	1:21
16.	"Deuces"	1:42
17.	"Niggas Is Niggas"	1:30
18.	"1 Deep"	1:12
Total length:		32:52

== Charts ==
Chart performance for Comethazine the Album
Chart (2021)	Peak position
US Billboard 200	185
