= Cole Bennett =

American artist; founder of Lyrical Lemonade (born 1996)

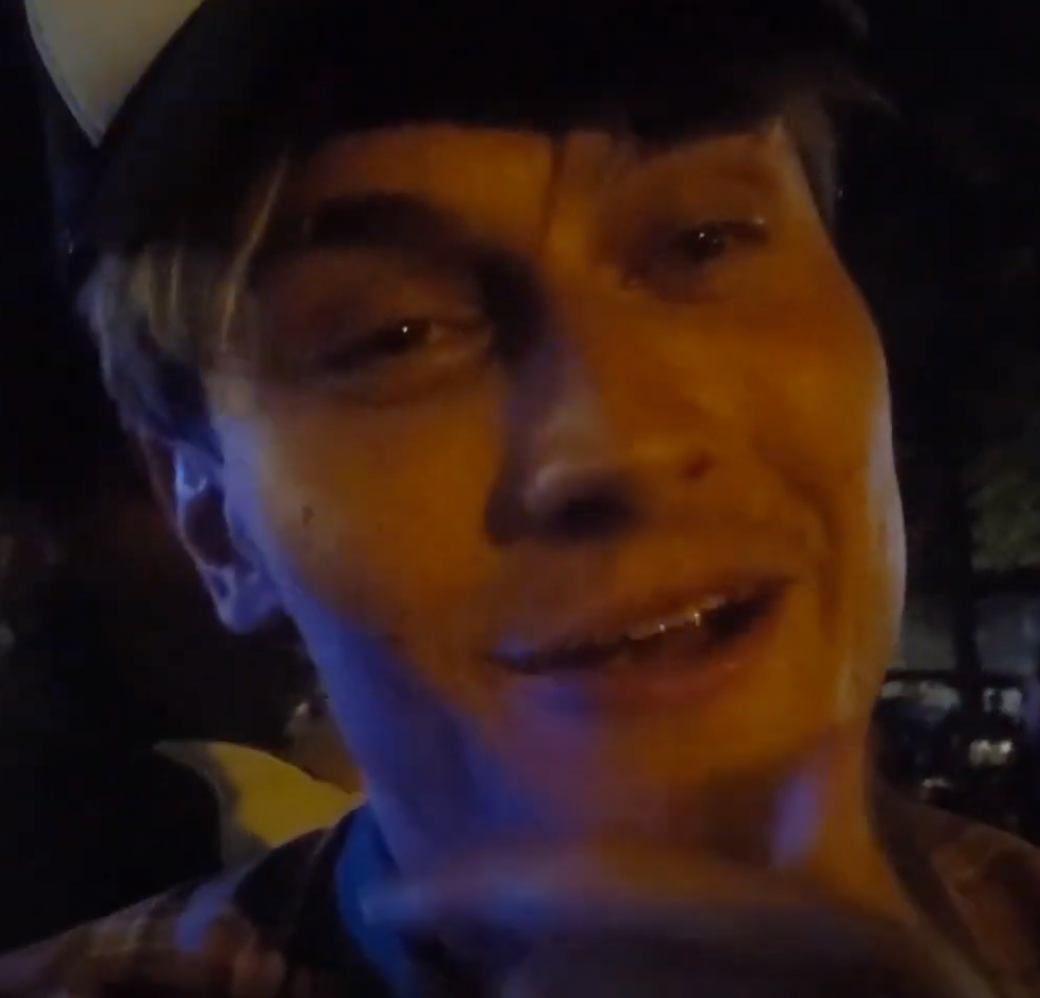
- Born: Cole Michael Bennett; May 14, 1996 (age 30); Plano, Illinois, U.S
- Occupations: Music video director; videographer; music promoter
- Years active: 2013–present

YouTube information
- Channel: Lyrical Lemonade
- Subscribers: 24.1 million
- Views: 13.1 billion
- Last updated: May 2026
- Website: lyricallemonade.com

Cole Michael Bennett (born May 14, 1996) is an American music video director and record executive. As founder of the video production banner Lyrical Lemonade, he has directed music videos for artists including Yeat, Eminem, Justin Bieber, Juice Wrld, Kanye West, Drake, Tyler, the Creator, Clipse, Sienna Spiro, Jack Black, and J. Cole, among others. His debut studio album All Is Yellow (2024), was released by Def Jam Recordings.

== Early life ==
Cole Michael Bennett was born on May 14, 1996, in Plano, Illinois. His father died when Bennett was two years old, resulting in him being raised by his mother and two older sisters. He went to Plano High School and DePaul University before dropping out to focus on his career in videography and hip-hop, which he had been interested in since childhood.

== Career ==
=== 2013–2016: Early career ===
Bennett originally founded Lyrical Lemonade as an internet blog when he was a high school student in Plano, Illinois. His mother helped him come up with the blog's name and had given him a video camera. He began directing music videos for local Chicago rappers, such as Vic Mensa, Taylor Bennett, King Louie, and Ridgio, all of which he uploaded onto the Lyrical Lemonade channel. His channel also featured live show recaps, cyphers, documentaries and interviews.

=== 2016–2023: Rise to popularity and numerous music videos ===
The channel then expanded into other sub-genres of hip hop beyond the local Chicago scene, such as the emerging Soundcloud rap sub-genre. In 2016 and early 2017, he gained early recognition, working with artists such as Famous Dex, Lil Pump, Smokepurpp, and Ski Mask the Slump God. On April 7, 2017, he released his first short film, "Lone Springs". In August 2017, he directed the music video for the Lil Xan single, "Betrayed", which was certified Platinum by the RIAA in 2018. He later directed numerous music videos for hit songs, which include Ski Mask the Slump God's "BabyWipe", Lil Skies' "Red Roses" and "Nowadays", and YBN Nahmir's "Bounce Out with That".

In May 2018, he directed the music video for Chicago rapper Juice Wrld's "Lucid Dreams", which peaked at number 2 on the Billboard Hot 100. As of August 2024, the video has surpassed 1 billion views on YouTube, becoming his most popular video on the channel. He has since worked with mainstream figures in hip hop such as J. Cole, Wiz Khalifa, Kanye West, and Eminem.

In January 2020, he directed the music video for Kentucky rapper Jack Harlow's breakout single "What's Poppin". Later that month, Bennett directed the music video for The Kid Laroi and Lil Tecca's song "Diva". In March 2020, he directed the music video for Eminem's hit single "Godzilla". The video itself features cameos from Dr. Dre and Mike Tyson. It gained 13 million views in 24 hours. In December 2020, in his second collaboration with Eminem, Bennett directed the music video for the rapper's single "Gnat".

=== 2023–2024: All Is Yellow ===
In 2023, Bennett began releasing tracks from his debut studio album, titled All Is Yellow (2024). The lead single from the album, "Doomsday", with Juice Wrld and Cordae, was released on June 23, 2023, and reached number 58 on the Billboard Hot 100, 49 on the Canadian Hot 100, 83 on the Irish Singles Chart, and 92 on the UK Singles Chart. The album's second single, "Guitar in My Room", with Lil Durk and Kid Cudi, was released on September 29. The third single, "Hello There", with Corbin, Lil Tracy and Black Kray, was released on October 20. The album's fourth single, "Stop Giving Me Advice", with Dave and Jack Harlow, was released on December 8 and charted at number 33 on the Irish Singles Chart, and 29 on the UK Singles Chart. The fifth and final single, "Fallout", with Gus Dapperton, Lil Yachty and Joey Badass, was released on January 12, 2024.

All Is Yellow was released on January 26, 2024. The tracklist was revealed on January 13, 2024.

Bennett went on to direct a music video for every song of off the album. Three of the videos are yet to be released.

=== 2024–present: Films, documentaries and entrepreneurship ===
In May 2024, Bennett announced that he would be stepping down from directing every Lyrical Lemonade video on the YouTube channel. Mentioning that he would be directing only a select music videos a year moving forward. With this, he also stated that he will be signing video directors to keep the story going. Since then, Lyrical Lemonade has signed 3 music video directors – AMD, Diamond Visuals and Reduciano.

In October 2024, Rolling Stone announced that Bennett would be directing a Chief Keef documentary detailing the story of Keef's return home to Chicago, produced by Kenya Barris. Bennett has mentioned he is focused on making a feature film in the coming years while continuing to build his production company.

== Impact ==
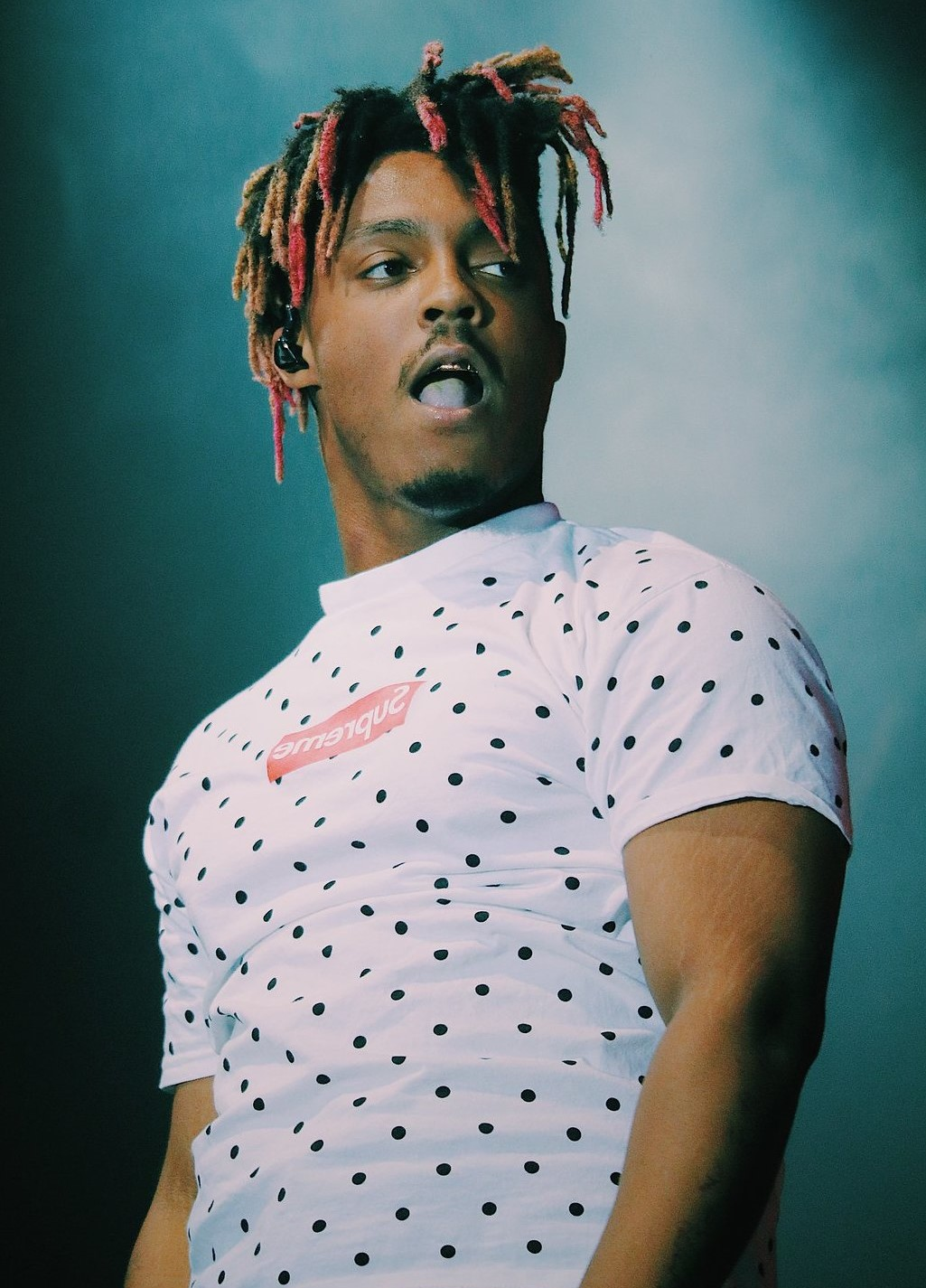
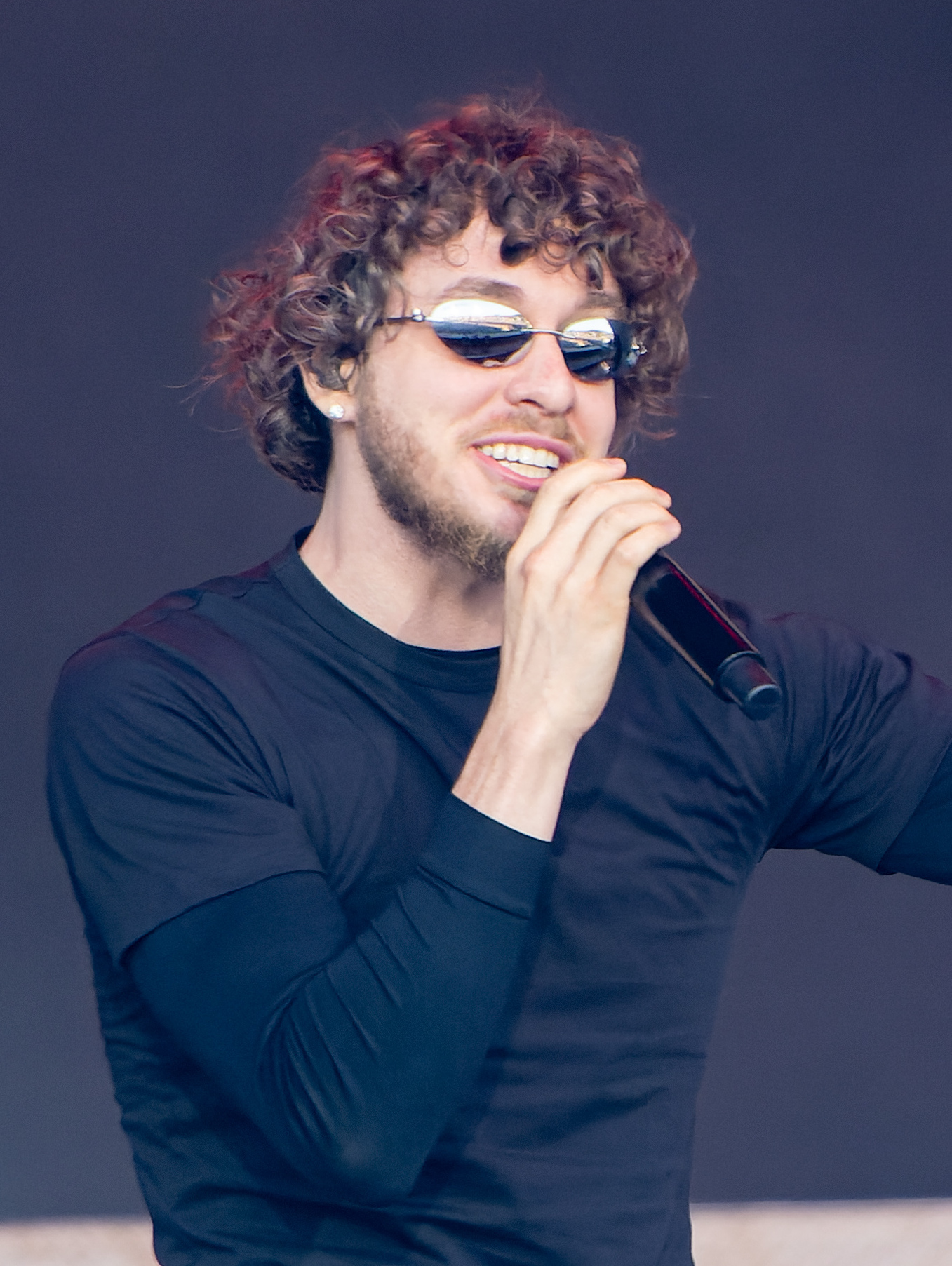
Lyrical Lemonade has contributed to the rise of various rappers such as Juice Wrld (left) and Jack Harlow (right).

Bennett's Lyrical Lemonade frequently promotes and contributes to the rise of upcoming rappers. Examples of this include Lil Pump, whose appearance on Lyrical Lemonade elevated his popularity to a certain extent. Other examples include Smokepurpp, Juice Wrld, Ski Mask the Slump God, YNW Melly, Lil Tecca, NLE Choppa, Lil Mosey, The Kid Laroi, Yeat, Trippie Redd, and Jack Harlow.

Pitchfork named Ski Mask the Slump God's 2017 "Catch Me Outside" music video, which was directed by Bennett, one of their favorite music videos of the 2010s.

== Other ventures ==
Bennett hosts an independent music festival called The Lyrical Lemonade Summer Smash every Summer. It was started in 2018 in partnership with Chicago-based event production label SPKRBX. The festival is three days long and brings in over 40,000 people a day. Summer Smash has featured acts such as Travis Scott, Post Malone, Juice Wrld, Lauryn Hill, Insane Clown Posse and many more.

Bennett has also ventured into creating merchandise and lemonade beverages under the Lyrical Lemonade name. He said, "I really want to compete with Minute Maid and all of the elite lemonade and juice companies and I really think we can do that."

In February 2020, Lyrical Lemonade collaborated with Jordan Brand. The collection included an Aerospace 720 shoe, a hooded sweatshirt, and a long sleeve t-shirt. In April 2020, Lyrical Lemonade collaborated with streetwear brand FTP. The collection included a hooded sweatshirt, a t-shirt, and co-branded cans of lemonade.

Since then, Lyrical Lemonade joined Illumination Studios for a partnership. Lyrical Lemonade has done two creative projects for The Minions and one for The Super Mario Bros. Movie with Jack Black.

In November 2021, Bennett launched another virtual retail space called "By Cole Bennett." Here, individuals are able to buy clothing and other soft goods that are designed by Bennett himself and are subject to very limited releases. On the same virtual store front, Bennett occasionally allows fans to purchase props previously used in Lyrical Lemonade videos.

== Lyrical Lemonade discography ==
=== Studio albums ===
List of studio albums, with selected details
Title	Details	Peak chart positions				
Title	Details	US	US R&B/HH	AUS	CAN	NZ
All Is Yellow	Released: January 26, 2024; Label: Lyrical Lemonade, Def Jam; Format: CD, LP, digital download, streaming	43	16	86	51	23

=== Singles ===
List of singles with chart positions
Title	Year	Peak chart positions						Certifications	Album
Title	Year	US	US R&B/HH	CAN	IRE	NZ Hot	UK	Certifications	Album
"Doomsday" (with Juice Wrld and Cordae)	2023	58	19	49	83	3	92	RIAA: Gold	All Is Yellow
"Guitar in My Room" (with Kid Cudi and Lil Durk)	2023	—	—	—	—	—	—		All Is Yellow
"Hello There" (with Corbin and Lil Tracy featuring Black Kray)	2023	—	—	—	—	—	—		All Is Yellow
"Stop Giving Me Advice" (with Dave featuring Jack Harlow)	2023	—	—	—	33	7	29		All Is Yellow
"Fallout" (with Gus Dapperton featuring Lil Yachty and Joey Badass)	2024	—	—	—	—	—	—		All Is Yellow
"Tree on the Hill (Lunch Break Freestyle)" (with Nino Paid)	2025	—	35	—	—	—	—	RIAA: Gold	Non-album single
"—" denotes a recording that did not chart or was not released in that territory.

=== Other charted songs ===
List of other charted songs, with chart positions
Title	Year	Peak chart positions			Album
Title	Year	US Bub.	US R&B/HH	NZ Hot	Album
"Fly Away" (with JID, Sheck Wes, and Ski Mask the Slump God)	2024	—	—	34	All Is Yellow
"Say Ya Grace" (with Chief Keef and Lil Yachty)	2024	—	—	32	All Is Yellow
"This My Life" (with Lil Tecca featuring the Kid Laroi and Lil Skies)	2024	19	49	20	All Is Yellow
"Doomsday Pt. 2" (with Eminem)	2024	—	—	16	All Is Yellow

== Accolades ==
Award ceremony	Year	Category	Nominated work	Result	Ref(s)
BET Awards	2020	Video Director of the Year	Himself	Nominated	
BET Awards	2021	Video Director of the Year	Himself	Nominated	
BET Awards	2023	Video Director of the Year	Himself	Nominated	
BET Awards	2024	Video Director of the Year	Himself	Won	
BET Awards	2025	Video Director of the Year	Himself	Nominated	
BET Awards	2026	Video Director of the Year	Himself	Nominated	
BET Hip Hop Awards	2020	Video Director of the Year	Himself	Nominated	
BET Hip Hop Awards	2021	Video Director of the Year	Himself	Nominated	
BET Hip Hop Awards	2022	Video Director of the Year	Himself	Nominated	
BET Hip Hop Awards	2023	Video Director of the Year	Himself	Nominated	
BET Hip Hop Awards	2024	Video Director of the Year	Himself	Nominated	
Streamy Awards	2019	Directing	Lyrical Lemonade	Nominated	
Streamy Awards	2020	Cinematography	Lyrical Lemonade	Nominated	
Streamy Awards	2022	Cinematography	Lyrical Lemonade	Won	
Streamy Awards	2023	Cinematography	Lyrical Lemonade	Nominated	

== Selected videography ==
List of music videos directed, showing year released
Year	Title	Artist
2017	"D Rose"	Lil Pump
2017	"Catch Me Outside"	Ski Mask the Slump God
2017	"Betrayed"	Lil Xan
2017	"BabyWipe"	Ski Mask the Slump God
2017	"Red Roses" (featuring Landon Cube)	Lil Skies
2017	"Nowadays" (featuring Landon Cube)	Lil Skies
2018	"Bounce Out with That"	YBN Nahmir
2018	"All Girls Are the Same"	Juice Wrld
2018	"123"	Smokepurpp and Murda Beatz
2018	"Welcome to the Rodeo"	Lil Skies
2018	"Bands"	Comethazine
2018	"Lucid Dreams"	Juice Wrld
2018	"DoIHaveTheSause?"	Ski Mask the Slump God
2018	"Creeping" (featuring Rich the Kid)	Lil Skies
2018	"Noticed"	Lil Mosey
2018	"Fr Fr" (featuring Lil Skies)	Wiz Khalifa
2018	"Walk"	Comethazine
2018	"Magic in the Hamptons" (featuring Lil Yachty)	Social House
2018	"Kamikaze"	Lil Mosey
2018	"Armed and Dangerous"	Juice Wrld
2018	"Off Deez" (featuring J. Cole)	JID
2018	"Bleed It"	Blueface
2019	"Mixed Personalities" (featuring Kanye West)	YNW Melly
2019	"Thotiana" (Remix) (featuring YG)	Blueface
2019	"Robbery"	Juice Wrld
2019	"Thotiana" (Remix) (featuring Cardi B)	Blueface
2019	"Faucet Failure"	Ski Mask the Slump God
2019	"i"	Lil Skies
2019	"Have Mercy"	YBN Cordae
2019	"Ransom"	Lil Tecca
2019	"Stop Snitchin" (Remix) (featuring DaBaby)	YG
2019	"Shotta Flow" (Remix) (featuring Blueface)	NLE Choppa
2019	"Camelot"	NLE Choppa
2019	"Bandit" (featuring NBA YoungBoy)	Juice Wrld
2019	"Nuketown" (featuring Juice Wrld)	Ski Mask the Slump God
2020	"Whats Poppin"	Jack Harlow
2020	"Diva" (featuring Lil Tecca)	The Kid Laroi
2020	"Thief in the Night"	Rod Wave
2020	"Godzilla" (featuring Juice Wrld)	Eminem
2020	"Blueberry Faygo"	Lil Mosey
2020	"Tell Me U Luv Me" (featuring Trippie Redd)	Juice Wrld
2020	"Shotta Flow 5"	NLE Choppa
2020	"21"	Polo G
2020	"3 Headed Goat" (featuring Lil Baby & Polo G)	Lil Durk
2020	"Tell Me Why"	The Kid Laroi
2020	"Lemonade" (featuring Gunna, Nav and Don Toliver)	Internet Money
2020	"Gifted" (featuring Roddy Ricch)	Cordae
2020	"Dolly" (featuring Lil Uzi Vert)	Lil Tecca
2020	"So Done"	The Kid Laroi
2020	"Coco" (featuring DaBaby)	24kGoldn
2020	"Gnat"	Eminem
2021	"Bad Boy" (featuring Young Thug)	Juice Wrld
2021	"GNF (OKOKOK)"	Polo G
2021	"Whipski" (featuring Lil Skies)	Snot
2021	"Knock Knock"	SoFaygo
2021	"His & Hers" (featuring Don Toliver, Lil Uzi Vert and Gunna)	Internet Money
2021	"Tell Em" (featuring Snot)	Cochise
2021	"Motley Crew"	Post Malone
2021	"Papercuts"	Machine Gun Kelly
2021	"Who Want Smoke??" (featuring Lil Durk, 21 Savage and G Herbo)	Nardo Wick
2022	"Life Goes On" (featuring Trippie Redd & Ski Mask the Slump God)	Oliver Tree
2022	"What Happened to Virgil" (featuring Gunna)	Lil Durk
2022	"Honest" (featuring Don Toliver)	Justin Bieber
2022	"Talk About Me" (featuring JID, Denzel Curry and Kid Cudi)	Dot da Genius
2022	"Doja"	Central Cee
2022	"Out thë Way"	Yeat
2022	"Backstage Passes" (featuring Jack Harlow)	EST Gee
2022	"Poland"	Lil Yachty
2022	"Edging"	Blink-182
2022	"My All"	Polo G
2023	"Peaches"	Jack Black
2023	"Strike (Holster)"	Lil Yachty
2023	"Doomsday"	Lyrical Lemonade, Juice Wrld and Cordae
2023	"Bigger Thën Everything"	Yeat
2023	"Tesla"	Lil Yachty
2023	"Fighting My Demons"	Ken Carson
2023	"Stop Giving Me Advice"	Lyrical Lemonade, Jack Harlow and Dave
2024	"Doomsday Pt. 2"	Lyrical Lemonade and Eminem
2024	"Praise Jah in the Moonlight"	YG Marley
2024	"Tobey" (featuring Big Sean and BabyTron)	Eminem
2024	"Hate Me"	Lil Yachty and Ian
2024	"Sorry Not Sorry"	Lil Yachty and Veeze
2024	"Bad Time"	Lil Tecca
2024	"F*ck Swag"	Nettspend
2024	"Change Me"	BigXthaPlug
2025	"GBP"	Central Cee and 21 Savage
2025	"ExtraL"	Jennie and Doechii
2025	"Catch Me Outside 2"	Ski Mask the Slump God
2025	"Yukon"	Justin Bieber
2025	"P.O.V."	Clipse and Tyler, the Creator
2026	"Die on This Hill"	Sienna Spiro
2026	"Rendezvous"	Don Toliver and Yeat

== Filmography ==
Year	Title	Role	Ref.
2021	Juice Wrld: Into the Abyss	Himself	
