= Creeping (song) =

Single by Lil Skies featuring Rich the Kid

Single by Lil Skies featuring Rich the Kid
- Released: March 19, 2018
- Genre: Hip hop; trap
- Length: 2:59
- Label: All We Got; Atlantic
- Songwriters: Kimetrius Foose; Dimitri Roger; Amin Elamin
- Producer: Menoh Beats

Lil Skies singles chronology
"Pop Star" (2018)	"Creeping" (2018)	"Off the Gas" (2018)

Rich the Kid singles chronology
"Early Morning Trappin" (2018)	"Creeping" (2018)	"Back Quick" (2018)

Music video
- "Creeping" on YouTube

"Creeping" is a song by American rapper Lil Skies, first released on March 5, 2018, as a track from Ethika's mixtape RBG 2 (2018), before being released as a single on March 19, 2018. It features American rapper Rich the Kid and was produced by Menoh Beats.

== Composition ==
In the song, Lil Skies "takes aim at women who hated on him in the past" with the lyrics: "Why you like to lie, shawty, you know you impressed / See you fuckin' with me now 'cause I bossed up and I flex / All they like to do is talk when they knew that I was next / I just come up with these hits and lay low, collect my checks". Rich the Kid raps about "his newfound lavish lifestyle and materialistic ways".

== Critical reception ==
Emmanuel Maduakolam of Hypebeast called the track the "prime song for late night parties". Aron A. of HotNewHipHop described it as "an infectious joint that highlights both of their strengths." Joe Price of Complex writes that Lil Skies "flexes his talents" with a "melodic and mesmerizing flow", and that Rich the Kid switches "between different flows with a stop-start approach that adds a lot to song."

== Music video ==
A music video was released on July 9, 2018. Directed by Cole Bennett, the video shows Lil Skies on a school bus trying to impress a girl he likes. After she goes home, Skies and Rich the Kid rap from her yard of her home. The girl's father then comes outside and snatches Skies into the house.

== Charts ==
Chart performance for "Creeping"
Chart (2018)	Peak position
Canada (Canadian Hot 100)	93
US Bubbling Under Hot 100 Singles (Billboard)	1
US Hot R&B/Hip-Hop Songs	44

== Certifications ==
Certifications for "Creeping"
Region	Certification	Certified units/sales
United States (RIAA)	Gold	500,000^{‡}
^{‡} Sales+streaming figures based on certification alone.
