= Bands (song) =

Single by Comethazine

Single by Comethazine

from the album Bawskee
- Released: March 2, 2018
- Genre: Trap
- Length: 1:38
- Label: Alamo
- Songwriters: Frankie Childress; Luis Rodrigues
- Producer: Foreign Heat

Comethazine singles chronology
"Piped Up" (2017)	"Bands" (2018)	"Let It Eat" (2018)

Music video
- "Bands" on YouTube

"Bands" is a song by American rapper Comethazine. It was first released in January 2018 through the streaming platform SoundCloud, before being released again in March of that year. The song is the second single from his debut mixtape Bawskee (2018), and is one of the songs that propelled him to fame. It was certified gold by RIAA.

== Background ==
In January 2018, the song was uploaded on SoundCloud via an account called "sound_clout_xxx", which previously hosted rapper YBN Nahmir's viral song "Bounce Out with That" on the platform. The aforementioned track's audio file had been replaced with that of "Bands". As a result, "Bands" quickly reached No. 1 on the SoundCloud Charts. On Reddit, some users noticed the swap and that the account was an impostor, leading to it being deleted along with the song. The incident helped the song increase in popularity. On March 2, 2018, the song was officially released to streaming services.

== Remix ==
An official remix of the song featuring American rapper Rich the Kid was released on March 8, 2018.

== Music video ==
A music video for the song directed by Cole Bennett was released on May 2, 2018. In it, Comethazine is a newspaper delivery boy in a suburban neighborhood, and burglarizes an empty house.

== Certifications ==
Region	Certification	Certified units/sales
United States (RIAA)	Gold	500,000^{‡}
^{‡} Sales+streaming figures based on certification alone.
