= Walk (Comethazine song) =

2018 single by Comethazine

- Remix cover

Single by Comethazine

from the album Bawskee
- Released: September 22, 2018
- Genre: Trap
- Length: 1:36
- Label: Alamo
- Songwriters: Frankie Childress; Brandon Wright
- Producer: BHUNNA

Comethazine singles chronology
"Oowee" (2018)	"Walk" (2018)	"High Riser" (2018)

Music video
- "Walk" on YouTube

"Walk" is a song by American rapper Comethazine. It is the fourth single from his debut mixtape Bawskee (2018), and is considered his breakout hit. On March 18, 2019, a remix of the song featuring American rapper ASAP Rocky was released.

== Music video ==
A music video for the song was directed by Cole Bennett and released on September 22, 2018. In it, Comethazine plays the role of a husband and father in a family.

== Remix ==
The official remix of the song features American rapper ASAP Rocky and was released on March 18, 2019. Comethazine premiered it on Zane Lowe's Beats 1 show. In regards to his collaboration, he stated that Rocky had reached out to him before the release of his mixtape Bawskee 2, that the remix was not made in an in-person session since both artists were on the road, and that they finished working on the song after Bawskee 2 was released. In addition, Comethazine praised Rocky's style, saying "I fuck with Rocky, bro. We both walk around like that for real, basically. So he just relates to me a lot... He's got a real good energy. He's real creative."

On the remix, ASAP Rocky performs the opening verse, before Comethazine raps for the rest of the song, including an additional verse. In his verse, Rocky raps about his wealth, references comedian Katt Williams' fight with a teenager in 2016, and uses a pun on Pebbles cereal and The Flintstones sitcom.

ASAP Rocky's feature was well-received by music critics. Aron A. of HotNewHipHop gave the remix a "Very Hottttt" rating and described Rocky as "flexing his volatile flow". Jordan Coley of Uproxx commented that Rocky, "as one would expect, absolutely brings the heat", and wrote, "Rocky is a natural fit over song's buzzy, extraterrestrial-sounding melody. Between its crisp claps and thudding 808, his silky, veteran cool is also a pleasant compliment to Comethazine's sneering brashness."

== Charts ==
Chart (2019)	Peak position
US Bubbling Under Hot 100 (Billboard)	20
US Bubbling Under R&B/Hip-Hop Singles (Billboard)	5

== Certifications ==
Region	Certification	Certified units/sales
United States (RIAA)	Platinum	1,000,000^{‡}
^{‡} Sales+streaming figures based on certification alone.
