= Bawskee 3.5 =

2019 mixtape by Comethazine

Mixtape by Comethazine
- Released: July 26, 2019
- Genre: Hip-hop
- Length: 22:16
- Label: Alamo
- Producer: KC Supreme; div; Toom; Shoki; ChildBoy; ReidMD; BluntedBeatz; M-80; Honorable C.N.O.T.E.

Comethazine chronology
| Bawskee 2 (2019) | Bawskee 3.5 (2019) | PANDEMIC (2020) |

Singles from Bawskee 3.5
- 1. "Just Saying" Released: June 21, 2019; 2. "Stand" Released: July 19, 2019

Bawskee 3.5 (stylized in all-caps) is the third mixtape by American rapper Comethazine, released on July 26, 2019 by Alamo Records and Interscope Records. It serves as the third installment in the Bawskee mixtape series.

== Singles ==
The mixtape's lead single "Just Saying" was released on June 21, 2019.

The second single "Stand" was released on July 19, only eight days before the release of the mixtape.

== Critical reception ==
Professional ratings
Review scores
| Source | Rating |
|---|---|
| HipHopDX | 3/5 stars |
| AllMusic | mixed |

Bawskee 3.5 mostly mixed reviews. Neil Z. Yeung of AllMusic wrote, "While not much has changed -- both in regards to lyrical content and production quality -- listeners in need of another dose of the Bawskee will be pleased with this fresh dozen."

Riley Wallace of HipHopDX gave the mixtape a 3/5 rating saying, "While his ultra-violent, gruff, murder raps remain almost painfully consistent, he still manages to experiment with his style and beat selection playfully."

== Commercial performance ==
Bawskee 3.5 debuted at number 53 on the US Billboard 200 chart.

== Track listing ==
Credits adapted from Genius.

| No. | Title | Writer(s) | Producer(s) | Length |
|---|---|---|---|---|
| 1. | "Hench Mafia" | Frank Childress; Divjot Anand | Div; KC Supreme | 1:43 |
| 2. | "Rasputia" | Childress; Thomas Herrick | Toom | 1:35 |
| 3. | "Goddontlikeugly" | Childress; Shoki | Shoki | 2:01 |
| 4. | "Find Him!" | Childress; Anand | Div | 1:43 |
| 5. | "Stand" | Childress | | 1:38 |
| 6. | "Solved the Problem" | Childress; Anand | Div | 1:57 |
| 7. | "No Evidence" | Childress; Anand | Div | 1:57 |
| 8. | "Dangerous" | Childress; Herrick | Toom | 2:20 |
| 9. | "Fuck Errbody" | Childress; ChildBoy | ChildBoy | 2:07 |
| 10. | "Just Saying" | Childress; Anand; Reid | Div; ReidMD | 1:49 |
| 11. | "Act" | Childress; Carlton Mays, Jr. | Honorable C.N.O.T.E.; BluntedBeatz; M-80 | 1:56 |
| 12. | "Touched" | Childress; Anand | Div | 1:36 |
| Total length: | | | | 22:16 |

Notes

- All track titles are stylized in all caps.

== Charts ==
| Chart (2019) | Peak position |
|---|---|
| Lithuanian Albums (AGATA) | 32 |
| US Billboard 200 | 53 |
| US Top R&B/Hip-Hop Albums (Billboard) | 26 |
