= Bawskee 4 =

Studio album by Comethazine
- Released: October 23, 2020
- Genre: Hip-hop
- Length: 26:43
- Label: Alamo Records
- Producers: ChildBoy; div; Toom; Nik Dean; Ambezza; IanoBeatz

Comethazine chronology
Pandemic (2020)	Bawskee 4 (2020)	Comethazine the Album (2021)

Singles from Bawskee 4
- 1. "Air Max" Released: September 9, 2020; 2. "We Gon Win" Released: September 23, 2020; 3. "Derek Jeter" Released: October 7, 2020

Bawskee 4 is the fourth mixtape by American rapper Comethazine and serves as the fourth installment in the Bawskee mixtape, released on October 23, 2020 by Alamo Records and Interscope Records.

== Singles ==
This album would have the most rollout compared to his previous albums, debuting his most singles to date. It would also feature a horror/slasher theme trailer presenting the album.

The first single to be released was "Air Max" released on September 9, 2020.

The second single "We Gon Win" was released on September 23, 2020

The final single "Derek Jeter" was released on October 7, 2020

== Chart performance ==
Bawskee 4 debuted at No. 177 on the Billboard 200.

== Track listing ==
Credited from Genius.

No.	Title	Writer(s)	Producer(s)	Length
1.	"Riddle"	Frank Childress; Childboy	Childboy	1:52
2.	"556"	Childress; div	div	2:28
3.	"Air Max"	Childress; div	div	2:26
4.	"Doubledecker"	IanoBeatz; Toom	IanoBeatz; Toom	2:06
5.	"Jumpman 4's"	Childress; div	div	1:25
6.	"Lame"	Childress; div; Nik Dean	Nik Dean; div	1:30
7.	"Sip Lean"	Childress; div	div	1:20
8.	"We Gone Win"	Childress; div; Ambezza	Ambezza; div	2:29
9.	"Two 45s"	Childress; div	div	1:33
10.	"Murder Passion"	Childress; ChildBoy	ChildBoy	1:24
11.	"Still A OG"	Childress; div	div	1:40
12.	"Derek Jeter"	Childress; ChildBoy	ChildBoy	1:37
13	"Complaining"	Childress; Childboy	ChildBoy	1:31
14	"Skin That I'm in"	Childboy; Childress	ChildBoy	1:46
15	"Get Naked"	ChildBoy; Childress	ChildBoy	1:48
Total length:				26:48

== Charts ==
Chart performance for Bawskee 4
Chart (2020)	Peak position
US Billboard 200	177
