= Pandemic (album) =

Studio album by Comethazine
- Released: March 27, 2020
- Genre: Hip-hop
- Length: 20:12
- Label: Alamo
- Producer: ChildBoy; div; Toom; Flip_00; Myles William

Comethazine chronology
Bawskee 3.5 (2019)	Pandemic (2020)	Bawskee 4 (2020)

Singles from Pandemic
- 1. "Glide" Released: September 28, 2019; 2. "No Front" Released: March 20, 2020

Pandemic is the debut studio album by American rapper Comethazine. it was released on March 27, 2020, by Alamo Records.

== Promotion ==
=== Singles ===
- "Glide" was released as the album's first single on September 28, 2019, under the title "Glide Freestyle". A music video accompanied the release of the track.
- "No Front" was released as the album's second single on March 20, 2020, along with a music video.

== Track listing ==
All tracks are written by Frank "Comethazine" Childress alongside the producer(s).

Pandemic track listing
No.	Title	Producer(s)	Length
1.	"No Front"	ChildBoy	1:46
2.	"Mama's Glizzy"	ChildBoy	1:36
3.	"Permanent"	ChildBoy	1:25
4.	"Ambitions"	ChildBoy	1:25
5.	"Blu-Ray"	div; Toom	2:05
6.	"Pitbull"	ChildBoy	1:46
7.	"Get Out"	div	1:25
8.	"Nutted"	div; Flip_00; Myles William	1:57
9.	"Lead the Race (Undefeated)"	ChildBoy	1:51
10.	"Glide"	ChildBoy	1:26
11.	"Plottin'"	ChildBoy	1:46
12.	"Gallardo"	div	1:44
Total length:			20:12

== Charts ==
Chart performance for Pandemic
Chart (2020)	Peak position
US Billboard 200	151
