= Nowadays (song) =

2017 single by Lil Skies

Single by Lil Skies featuring Landon Cube

from the album Life of a Dark Rose
- Released: December 17, 2017
- Recorded: 2017
- Genre: Trap; emo rap; R&B
- Length: 3:24
- Label: All We Got; Atlantic
- Songwriters: Lil Skies; Landon Cube; Alex Petit
- Producer: CashMoneyAP

Lil Skies singles chronology
"Lonely" (2017)	"Nowadays" (2017)	"Now" (2018)

Music video
- "Nowadays" on YouTube

"Nowadays" is a song by American rapper and singer Lil Skies featuring American singer Landon Cube. It was released for digital download on December 17, 2017, as the second single from Skies' mixtape Life of a Dark Rose. The song is one of the two first Lil Skies songs (alongside "Red Roses", another collaboration with Landon Cube) to reach the US Billboard Hot 100, debuting at number 85 and peaking at number 55.

The sequel to the track, "Nowadays, Pt. 2" featuring Landon Cube was featured on Skies' debut studio album Shelby released on March 1, 2019.

== Background ==
This song is about lil skies break up with his bff claire echoing the distaste for a relationship as well as "fake friends" from his previous hit "Red Roses", Lil Skies and previous collaborator Landon Cube harmonize about their fast-paced living and achievements, presumably after their newfound fame, on an up-tempo CashMoneyAP production.

== Music video ==
The music video was shot at Plano High School (Illinois). On December 17, 2017, Cole Bennett uploaded the music video for "Nowadays" on his YouTube account, Lyrical Lemonade. The music video has amassed over 309 million views, as of June, 2021.

The music video for the song, set in a high school and depicting Skies as a senior jock, is directed by Cole Bennett.

== Track listing ==
No.	Title	Writer(s)	Producer(s)	Length
1.	"Nowadays"	Lil Skies, Landon Cube, Fame-Is	CashMoneyAP, Mono Beats	3:24

== Charts ==
=== Weekly charts ===
Chart (2018)	Peak position
Canada Hot 100 (Billboard)	63
Portugal (AFP)	72
US Billboard Hot 100	55
US Hot R&B/Hip-Hop Songs (Billboard)	22

=== Year-end charts ===
Chart (2018)	Position
US Hot R&B/Hip-Hop Songs (Billboard)	81

== Certifications ==
Region	Certification	Certified units/sales
Canada (Music Canada)	Platinum	80,000^{‡}
Denmark (IFPI Danmark)	Gold	45,000^{‡}
Portugal (AFP)	Gold	5,000^{‡}
United Kingdom (BPI)	Gold	400,000^{‡}
United States (RIAA)	2× Platinum	2,000,000^{‡}
^{‡} Sales+streaming figures based on certification alone.
