= I Know You =

I Know You may refer to:

- "I Know You" (Skylar Grey song), a 2015 song
- "I Know You" (Craig David song), a 2017 song
- "I Know You" (Lil Skies song), a 2018 song
- "I Know You", a 1997 song by Jann Arden from the album Happy?
