= Zhavia Ward =

American singer and songwriter (born 2001)

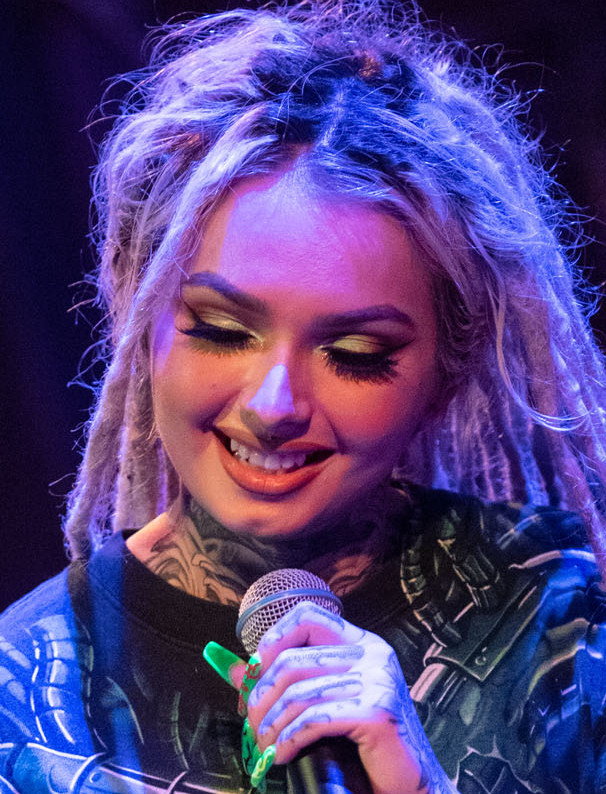
- Ward performing in 2019

Background information
- Born: Carisa Zhavia Ward; March 6, 2001 (age 25); Los Angeles, California, US
- Genres: R&B
- Occupations: Singer; songwriter
- Years active: 2018–present
- Label: Columbia

Carisa Zhavia Ward (born March 6, 2001) is an American singer and songwriter. Ward rose to fame after competing in the Fox reality television show The Four: Battle for Stardom, in 2018, where she was one of four finalists. That same year, Ward signed with Columbia Records, and guest appeared on Diplo, French Montana, and Lil Pump's single "Welcome to the Party" for the Deadpool 2 soundtrack, which peaked at number 78 on the Billboard Hot 100. She co-performed a cover of "A Whole New World" with Zayn Malik for the Aladdin soundtrack, which entered the Bubbling Under Hot 100 chart.

== Discography ==
=== Extended plays ===
List of extended plays, with selected details and chart positions
Title	Details
17	Released: June 13, 2019; Label: Columbia, Sony; Formats: Digital download, streaming

=== Singles ===
==== As a lead artist ====
Title	Year	Peak chart positions	Album
Title	Year	US Rhy	Album
"Candlelight" (solo or featuring Jeremih)	2018	40	17
"Deep Down"	2018	—	17
"100 Ways"	2018	—	17
"17"	2019	—	17
"Waiting"	2020	—	TBA
"God Sent You"	2022	—	TBA

==== As featured artist ====
List of singles as featured artist, with selected chart positions
Title	Year	Peak chart positions								Certifications	Album
Title	Year	US	US R&B/HH	AUS	CAN	CZH	FRA	NZ Heat.	SCO	Certifications	Album
"Welcome to the Party" (Diplo, French Montana and Lil Pump featuring Zhavia)	2018	78	54	87	55	36	146	8	93	RMNZ: Gold	Deadpool 2
"My Baby" (Lil Skies featuring Zhavia)	2021	-	-	-	-	-	-	-	-		Unbothered (Deluxe)

==== Promotional singles ====
Title	Year	Peak chart positions						Certifications	Album
Title	Year	US Bub.	AUS	IRE	NZ Hot	SWE	UK	Certifications	Album
"Unforgettable" (The Four Performance)	2018	—	—	—	—	—	—		Non-album single
"Killing Me Softly with His Song" (The Four Performance)	2018	—	—	—	—	—	—		Non-album single
"Say Something" (The Four Performance)	2018	—	—	—	—	—	—		Non-album single
"Man Down" (The Four Performance)	2018	—	—	—	—	—	—		Non-album single
"A Whole New World (End Title)" (with Zayn)	2019	17	73	64	8	— (Note: "A Whole New World" did not enter the Swedish Singellista Chart, but peaked at number 11 on the Swedish Heatseeker Chart.)	68	RMNZ: Gold	Aladdin (Original Motion Picture Soundtrack)
"—" denotes a recording that did not chart or was not released in that territory.

== Filmography ==
Television roles
Year	Title	Role	Note
2018	The Four: Battle for Stardom	Herself	Season 1 finalist

== Awards and nominations ==
Year	Award	Category	Nominated work	Result
2018	Talent Recap Fan Choice Awards	Breakout Talent Show Star	The Four: Battle for Stardom	Nominated
2019	Teen Choice Awards	Choice Song From A Movie	A Whole New World	Won

== Tours ==
=== Headlining ===
- 2019: The 17 Tour
