= 2Much 2Fast =

Single by Lil Skies featuring Landon Cube

Single by Lil Skies featuring Landon Cube

from the album The Evolution of the Rose
- Released: February 28, 2025
- Genre: Alternative hip-hop
- Length: 3:06
- Label: Big Noise Music Group
- Songwriters: Kimetrius Foose; Landon Cube; John Feldmann
- Producer: John Feldmann

Lil Skies singles chronology
"High Maintenance" (2025)	"2Much 2Fast" (2025)	"Falling Backwards" (2025)

Landon Cube singles chronology
"I Hate Being Away From You!" (2025)	"2Much 2Fast" (2025)

"2Much 2Fast" is a song by American rapper and singer Lil Skies featuring frequent collaborator Landon Cube. The song was released on February 28, 2025, and was produced by John Feldmann. "2much 2Fast" is the lead single to Skies third studio album The Evolution of the Rose.

== Lyrics ==
In the song Skies and Cube reflect on their past and quick rise to fame and the struggles of maintaining it. "I had too much, too fast, I knew it couldn't last. I flew too close to the sun, LA was hot, But I got lost, I flew too close to the sun" is the opening lines of the chorus.

== Music video ==
The music video displays both Skies and Cube in a run down trailer park, with an intro talking about their "fall off".
