= Red Roses (song) =

2017 single by Lil Skies featuring Landon Cube

Single by Lil Skies featuring Landon Cube

from the album Life of a Dark Rose
- Released: June 25, 2017
- Recorded: 2017
- Studio: DreamLabs
- Genre: Trap
- Length: 4:23
- Label: All We Got; Atlantic
- Songwriters: Kimetrius Foose; Landon Cube; Amin Elamin
- Producer: Menoh Beats

Lil Skies singles chronology
"Red Roses" (2017)	"Off The Goop" (2017)

Music video
- "Red Roses" on YouTube

"Red Roses" is the debut single by American rapper and singer Lil Skies featuring fellow American singer Landon Cube. It was released for digital download on June 25, 2017, as the lead single from the former's mixtape Life of a Dark Rose. The song is one of the two first Lil Skies songs (alongside "Nowadays", another collaboration with Landon Cube) to reach the Billboard Hot 100, debuting at number 98 and peaking at number 69. The song is a global hit, racking up over 300 million streams on each streaming service it was released through.

== Music video ==
On October 18, 2017, Cole Bennett uploaded the music video for "Red Roses" on his YouTube account. The music video currently has over 251 million views as of October 2022.

The visual shows the artists seated in front of an RV. A woman walks past them and they follow her.

== Charts ==
=== Weekly charts ===
Chart (2018)	Peak position
Canada Hot 100 (Billboard)	76
US Billboard Hot 100	69
US Hot R&B/Hip-Hop Songs (Billboard)	28

=== Year-end charts ===
Chart (2018)	Position
US Hot R&B/Hip-Hop Songs (Billboard)	72

== Certifications ==
Region	Certification	Certified units/sales
Canada (Music Canada)	Platinum	80,000^{‡}
Poland (ZPAV)	Gold	25,000^{‡}
United Kingdom (BPI)	Silver	200,000^{‡}
United States (RIAA)	2× Platinum	2,000,000^{‡}
^{‡} Sales+streaming figures based on certification alone.

== Release history ==
Region	Date	Format	Label	Ref.
Various	June 25, 2017	Digital download	All We Got	
United States	April 17, 2018	Urban contemporary radio	Atlantic	
