= Out Ur Body Music =

Mixtape by Lil Skies
- Released: March 29, 2024
- Recorded: 2023–2024
- Genre: Hip-hop
- Length: 24:48
- Label: All We Got
- Producers: Chris Marek; Ellis Lost; Monstereal; Prodbychaz; Zerby

Lil Skies chronology
Unbothered (2021)	Out Ur Body Music (2024)	The Evolution of the Rose (2025)

Singles from Out Ur Body Music
- 1. "Thousands" Released: February 9, 2024; 2. "Death" Released: March 8, 2024

Our Ur Body Music is the ninth mixtape by American rapper Lil Skies. It was released on March 29, 2024, by Skies own record label All We Got. The album was supported by singles "Thousands" and "Death". The mixtape features no guest appearances.

== Reception ==
With Teejay Small of HotNewHipHop stating "Lil Skies didn't put his best foot forward on this mixtape, leaving very little to love about Out Ur Body Music." Steve Juon of Rap Reviews called it "the latest in an ongoing series of releases that reflects how little Skies wants to connect with reality."

== Track listing ==
All tracks are written by Kimetrius Foose.

Our Ur Body Music track listing
No.	Title	Producer(s)	Length
1.	"Call Me"	Zerby	3:00
2.	"Drank Talk"	Zerby; Prodbychaz	3:01
3.	"Thousands"	Zerby; Chris Marek	2:49
4.	"Death"	Zerby	3:04
5.	"Pivot"	Zerby; Monstereal; Ellis Lost	3:36
6.	"Misunderstood"	Zerby	3:12
7.	"Runnin Out Of Time"	Zerby	2:59
8.	"Change On Me"	Zerby	3:05
Total length:			24:48

Notes:

- All tracks are stylised in uppercase aside from track 7, which is stylised as "Running Out Of Time"
