= Operation Snowball =

Drug-use prevention program based in Illinois, US

Operation Snowball is an international alcohol, tobacco and drug-use prevention program founded in Illinois in 1977, focusing on leadership development to encourage young people to avoid taking drugs. The name originates from the idea that having a positive impact on an individual can "snowball" into positive results for an entire community and beyond.

Operation Snowball is part-funded by the Illinois Department of Human Services, and governed by an elected board of directors.

== History ==
Operation Snowball was founded in 1977 in Rockford, Illinois, for youth and adults who attended the Illinois Teenage Institute on Substance Abuse (ITI), sponsored by the Illinois Alcoholism and Drug Dependence Association (IADD). In 1979, the Superintendent of Barrington Area Schools asked three Barrington High School students to identify ways Operation Snowball could work to have a positive impact on middle school and high school students. The students designed and piloted a peer-to-peer drug and alcohol prevention and intervention program in 1980, in which Barrington High School students met with class groups at Barrington Middle School to discuss the impact of alcohol on their lives, their decision to abstain, and the consequences of abstaining for their lives. From its inception, Operation Snowball was run by youth managers, with adults in primarily advisory roles. By 1989, the Barrington model was in use in all of Illinois School District 220, and later chapters throughout the state of Illinois. At first the program was targeted at high school (Operation Snowball) and junior high school students (Operation Snowflake), but was later expanded to include elementary schools (Operation Snowflurry). The model is now implemented mainly through retreats.

== Program models ==
Operation Snowball runs school-based and community-based chapters. Different program models include:

- Operation Snowflurry: Preschool and elementary age youth
- Operation Snowflake: Middle school and junior high school age youth
- Operation Snowball: High school age youth
- Operation Segue: young adults age 18–24
- Operation Blizzard: Families and adults
- Operation Snowcap: Senior citizens

Each program model focuses on the issues resulting from alcohol and other drug use and abuse in a manner appropriate for each age group. The programs follow the same principles and guidelines, and may include weekly meetings, weekend retreats, drug-free alternative activities, peer mentoring, and community events.
