= Havin My Way =

2020 single by Lil Skies featuring Lil Durk

Single by Lil Skies featuring Lil Durk

from the album Unbothered
- Released: March 4, 2020
- Length: 3:31
- Label: All We Got; Atlantic
- Songwriters: Kimetrius Foose; Durk Banks; Mattias Ringleb
- Producer: Slim Pharaoh

Lil Skies singles chronology
"Dirty Dirty" (2019)	"Havin My Way" (2020)	"Fidget" (2020)

Lil Durk singles chronology
"Real Nigga Party" (2020)	"Havin My Way" (2020)	"Chiraq Demons" (2020)

Music video
- "Havin My Way" on YouTube

"Havin My Way" is a song by American rapper Lil Skies, released on March 4, 2020 as the lead single from his second studio album Unbothered (2021). It features American rapper Lil Durk and was produced by Slim Pharaoh.

== Composition ==
The song contains a guitar beat and opens with Lil Skies performing the chorus, before proceeding to his verse. Lil Durk borrows the flow from "Drip Too Hard" by Lil Baby and Gunna in the beginning of his verse.

== Music video ==
The music video was released alongside the single. It depicts Lil Skies and Lil Durk as marionettes who are moved by an unseen puppet master to perform the track onstage to a crowd of people, who are also shown to be controlled by an outside force. The rappers eventually break free from the strings, which were tied to their arms and legs, and escape the building.

== Charts ==
Chart (2020)	Peak position
New Zealand Hot Singles (RMNZ)	28
US Bubbling Under Hot 100 (Billboard)	18

== Certifications ==
Region	Certification	Certified units/sales
United States (RIAA)	Gold	500,000^{‡}
^{‡} Sales+streaming figures based on certification alone.
