= I (Lil Skies song) =

2019 single by Lil Skies

Single by Lil Skies

from the album Shelby
- Released: March 1, 2019
- Genre: Hip hop; trap; emo rap
- Length: 3:01
- Label: All We Got; Atlantic
- Songwriters: Kimetrius Foose; Miguel Curtidor; Othello Houston; Timothy Gomringer; Kevin Gomringer
- Producers: Danny Wolf; Otxhello; Cubeatz

Lil Skies singles chronology
"Let Me See" (2019)	"I" (2019)	"Side Swipe" (2019)

Music video
- "I" on YouTube

"I" (stylized as "i") is a song by American rapper Lil Skies, released as the second single from his debut studio album Shelby on March 1, 2019. The track reminisces on Skies' past experiences with love and personal struggles among other memories.

== Music video ==
On February 28, 2019, Cole Bennett uploaded the music video for "I" on his YouTube account. The music video currently has over 95 million views as of July 2022.

== Charts ==
=== Weekly charts ===
Chart (2019)	Peak position
Canada (Canadian Hot 100)	51
New Zealand Hot Singles (RMNZ)	6
UK Singles (Official Charts)	93
US Billboard Hot 100	39
US Hot R&B/Hip-Hop Songs (Billboard)	17

=== Year-end charts ===
Chart (2019)	Position
US Hot R&B/Hip-Hop Songs (Billboard)	100

== Certifications ==
Region	Certification	Certified units/sales
Canada (Music Canada)	Gold	40,000^{‡}
New Zealand (RMNZ)	Platinum	30,000^{‡}
United Kingdom (BPI)	Silver	200,000^{‡}
United States (RIAA)	Platinum	1,000,000^{‡}
^{‡} Sales+streaming figures based on certification alone.
