= My Baby (Lil Skies song) =

Single by Lil Skies featuring Zhavia Ward

Single by Lil Skies featuring Zhavia Ward

from the album Unbothered
- Released: April 29, 2021
- Genre: Alternative R&B; emo rap; pop rap
- Length: 2:13
- Label: All We Got; Atlantic
- Songwriters: Kimetrius Foose; Carisa Zhavia Ward; Alex Petit
- Producer: CashMoneyAP

Lil Skies singles chronology
"Whipski" (2021)	"My Baby" (2021)	"Run It Back" (2021)

Zhavia Ward singles chronology
"Waiting" (2020)	"My Baby" (2021)	"Big Girl$ Don't Cry" (2021)

"My Baby" is a song by American rapper and singer Lil Skies featuring fellow American singer Zhavia Ward. Written alongside producer CashMoneyAP, it was released on April 29, 2021, as the lead single from the deluxe version of Skies' second studio album Unbothered (2021).

== Composition ==
In the song, Lil Skies and Zhavia Ward sings about their feelings towards their respective romantic interests.

== Reception ==
Samantha Agate of TalentRecap praised the song but wrote she would have liked it to have been longer.
