= Lust (Lil Skies song) =

2017 single by Lil Skies

Single by Lil Skies

from the album Life of a Dark Rose
- Released: December 12, 2017
- Recorded: 2017
- Genre: Cloud rap; trap
- Length: 2:36
- Label: All We Got; Atlantic
- Songwriters: Kimetrius Foose; Alex Petit
- Producer: CashMoneyAP

Lil Skies singles chronology
| "Moving On" (2017) | "Lust" (2017) | "Lonely" (2017) |

Music video
- "Lust" on YouTube

"Lust" is a single by American rapper Lil Skies. It was released for digital download on December 12, 2017, as the third single from his mixtape Life of a Dark Rose. The song peaked at no. 87 on the Billboard Hot 100.

== Music video ==
The video was directed by Nicholas Jandora. It depicts Skies as a detective who follows a female robber, whom he deems attractive. She later drugs Skies and the music video goes on when he is under the influence, and clearly captivated by the female's charm. It is partially animated and partially real-life visuals.

== Charts ==
| Chart (2018) | Peak position |
|---|---|
| US Billboard Hot 100 | 87 |
| US Hot R&B/Hip-Hop Songs (Billboard) | 47 |

== Certifications ==
| Region | Certification | Certified units/sales |
|---|---|---|
| Canada (Music Canada) | Platinum | 80,000^{‡} |
| Denmark (IFPI Danmark) | Gold | 45,000^{‡} |
| New Zealand (RMNZ) | 2× Platinum | 60,000^{‡} |
| Poland (ZPAV) | Gold | 25,000^{‡} |
| Portugal (AFP) | Gold | 5,000^{‡} |
| United Kingdom (BPI) | Gold | 400,000^{‡} |
| United States (RIAA) | 2× Platinum | 2,000,000^{‡} |
^{‡} Sales+streaming figures based on certification alone.
