= Comethazine =

American rapper (born 1998)

Frank Kole
- Born: Frank Childress; July 6, 1998 (age 28); East St. Louis, Illinois, U.S.
- Genres: Comethazine: Gangsta rap; Soundcloud rap; Midwestern hip-hop; trap; drill; Frank Kole: Alternative rock; Jazz
- Occupations: Rapper; singer; songwriter; director; trumpeter
- Years active: 2015–present
- Labels: Hench Mafia; Alamo; Sony (current); Interscope (former)
- Website: https://www.youtube.com/@FranzKole

Frank Jahmier Childress (born July 6, 1998), known professionally as Frank Kole and formerly as Comethazine, is an American rapper, singer, songwriter, and musician. He is best known for his platinum-selling single "Walk", which peaked at number 20 on the Billboard Bubbling Under Hot 100 chart and "Bands". Both songs were included on his debut mixtape, Bawskee (2018).

Bawskee was followed up by four sequels; Bawskee 2, Bawskee 3.5, Bawskee 4, and Bawskee 5. His debut album, Pandemic, was released in early 2020 to mainly positive critical reception. In 2019, he was an XXL Freshman and performed his cypher alongside rappers Roddy Ricch and Tierra Whack. His latest mixtape, Bawskee 5, was released in November 2022.

== Career ==
Childress began posting his music on audio distribution platform SoundCloud and video distribution platform Spotify as a teenager, allowing him to quit his job as a mechanic to focus on music full-time.

In early 2018, a feature on SoundCloud that allows their original sound file to be switched was abused for an unofficial upload of rapper YBN Nahmir's song "Bounce Out with That", that was replaced with his song "Bands", causing it to acquire the chart data of "Bounce Out with That". It is unclear who perpetrated this, though the account associated with the switch has since been removed. This incident helped increase the popularity of "Bands", which later appeared on his debut mixtape Bawskee. Another song on the mixtape, "Walk", became a viral hit and propelled Childress to further recognition. In 2019, he was selected to be a part of the 2019 XXL Freshmen Class. Comethazine announced the creation of his own record label, Hench Mafia Records, in June 2019.

On March 27, 2020, Childress's debut studio album as Comethazine, Pandemic, was released. His next project, Bawskee 4 followed on October 23, 2020, preceded by the music videos for "We Gone Win", "Air Max", and "Derek Jeter". Childress shot another music video for the song, "556", and released the entire album alongside it.

In late December 2020, Childress announced that his upcoming album would be titled Comethazine the Album.

On October 22, 2021, Comethazine the Album was released. It was promoted with the singles "Spinback" and "Six Flags".

On November 17, 2022, Bawskee 5 was released. Childress previewed the tracklist in a tweet posted the day prior.

=== As Frank Kole ===
Following the release of Bawskee 5, Childress discontinued the Comethazine moniker and began creating alternative rock music under the name Frank Kole. In October 2024, he released his first single, Smokestack Lightning, as the introduction for his upcoming studio album, Electric Mazeland. In November 2025, Childress released a rendition of Autumn Leaves by Hungarian composer Joseph Kosma, which he played on trumpet.

== Musical style and influences ==
Comethazine's music has been compared as a mixture of Playboi Carti, Smokepurpp and Tay-K, and has been referred to as anti-melody, a derivative form of trap that uses the bass as a source of melody instead of traditional instrumentation. He has cited rappers such as Big Mike, Pimp C, Chingy, Jadakiss, Special Ed, Chief Keef, Playboi Carti, Eminem, Waka Flocka Flame, 50 Cent, and Jim Jones as musical influences.

== Discography ==
=== Albums ===
Title	Details	Peak chart positions
Title	Details	US
Pandemic	Released: March 27, 2020; Label: Alamo; Format: Digital download, streaming	151
Comethazine the Album	Released: October 22, 2021; Label: Alamo; Format: Digital download, streaming	185

=== Mixtapes ===
Title	Details	Peak chart positions				Sales
Title	Details	US	US R&B /HH	US Rap	CAN	Sales
Bawskee	Released: August 24, 2018; Label: Alamo Records; Format: Digital download	136	—	—	—	
Bawskee 2	Released: January 11, 2019; Label: Alamo Records; Format: Digital download	61	36	—	66	
Bawskee 3.5	Released: July 26, 2019; Label: Alamo Records; Format: Digital download	53	26	23	59	• US: 13,000
Bawskee 4	Released: October 23, 2020; Label: Alamo Records; Format: Digital download	177	—	—	—	• US: 7,000
Bawskee 5	Released: November 18, 2022; Label: Alamo Records; Format: Digital download	—	—	—	—	
"—" denotes a recording that did not chart or was not released in that territory.						

=== Singles ===
Title	Year	Peak chart positions		Certifications	Album(s)
Title	Year	US Bub.	US R&B/HH Bub.	Certifications	Album(s)
"Piped Up"	2017	—	—		Bawskee
"Bands" (solo or with Rich the Kid)	2018	—	—	RIAA: Gold	Bawskee
"Let It Eat" (featuring Ugly God)	2018	—	—		Bawskee
"Oowee"	2018	—	—		Bawskee
"Walk" (solo or with A$AP Rocky)	2018	20	5	RIAA: Platinum	Bawskee
"Highriser"	2018	—	—		Non-album single
"DeMar DeRozan"	2018	—	—		Bawskee 2
"Nonsense"	2019	—	—		Bawskee 2
"Just Saying"	2019	—	—		Bawskee 3.5
"Stand"	2019	—	—		Bawskee 3.5
"50 Bars"	2019	—	—		Non-album single
"Glide"	2019	—	—		Pandemic
"No Front"	2020	—	—		Pandemic
"Air Max"	2020	—	—		Bawskee 4
"We Gone Win"	2020	—	—		Bawskee 4
"Derek Jeter"	2020	—	—		Bawskee 4
"Malcolm in the Middle"	2021	—	—		Non-album single
"Spinback"	2021	—	—		Comethazine the Album
"Six Flags"	2021	—	—		Comethazine the Album
"Like Dat"	2022	—	—		Non-album single
"Smokestack Lightning" _{(performed as Frank Kole)}	2024	—	—		
"Autumn Leaves" _{(performed as Frank Kole)}	2025	—	—		
"—" denotes a recording that did not chart or was not released in that territory.

=== Other charted songs ===
Title	Year	Peak chart positions	Certifications	Album
Title	Year	NZ Hot	Certifications	Album
"Find Him!"	2019	33		Bawskee 3.5
"Solved the Problem"	2019	34	RIAA: Gold	Bawskee 3.5
