= I Know You (Lil Skies song) =

Single by Lil Skies featuring Yung Pinch

Single by Lil Skies featuring Yung Pinch
- Released: May 31, 2018
- Length: 3:31
- Label: All We Got
- Songwriters: Kimetrius Foose; Blake Sandoval; Danny Snodgrass, Jr.; Dylan Clearly-Kell; Henry Nichols
- Producers: Taz Taylor; Dez Wright; Pharaoh Vice

Lil Skies singles chronology
"World Rage" (2018)	"I Know You" (2018)	"Name in the Sand" (2018)

Yung Pinch singles chronology
"Wake Up" (2018)	"I Know You" (2018)	"This My Wave" (2018)

Music video
- "I Know You" on YouTube

"I Know You" is a single by American rapper Lil Skies featuring American rapper Yung Pinch. It was released on May 31, 2018 with an accompanying music video and was produced by Taz Taylor. It is Yung Pinch's first and only song to chart, peaking at number 78 on the Billboard Hot 100.

== Background and composition ==
The song surfaced on the Internet and was teased for months before it was released. It finds Lil Skies and Yung Pinch singing about dealing with "groupies" since their newfound fame. Aron A. of HotNewHipHop described the production as "dark and heavy".

== Music video ==
The official music video was directed by Nicholas Jandora. The videos features "plenty of eclectic work on the graphics as effects boost the spaceship allure of the Tesla in which Skies lets off a few lines".

== Charts ==
Chart (2018)	Peak position
Canada (Canadian Hot 100)	94
US Billboard Hot 100	79
US Hot R&B/Hip-Hop Songs (Billboard)	40

== Certifications ==
Region	Certification	Certified units/sales
United States (RIAA)	Gold	500,000^{‡}
^{‡} Sales+streaming figures based on certification alone.
