= Unbothered =

Studio album by Lil Skies
- Released: January 22, 2021
- Recorded: 2019–2020
- Genre: Hip hop; trap; emo rap
- Length: 42:00
- Label: All We Got; Atlantic
- Producer: Andrew Cedar; Based1; Buddah Bless; CashMoneyAP; Cubeatz; Danny Wolf; Dru Armada; Gibbo; Hagan; Jakik; LMC; MVA Beats; Neel & Alex; Nils; Noahsaki; Pvlace; Rello; Slim Pharaoh; Sprite Lee; Steeze; T-Minus; Vendr

Lil Skies chronology
Shelby (2019)	Unbothered (2021)	Out Ur Body Music (2024)

Alternate cover
- Deluxe edition cover

Singles from Unbothered
- 1. "Havin My Way" Released: March 4, 2020; 2. "Riot" Released: May 14, 2020; 3. "On Sight" Released: November 6, 2020; 4. "Ok" Released: December 16, 2020; 5. "My Baby" Released: April 29, 2021

Unbothered is the second studio album by American rapper Lil Skies. It was released on January 22, 2021, by All We Got Entertainment and Atlantic Records. The album features guest appearances from Wiz Khalifa and Lil Durk. The deluxe version was released on May 14, 2021. It features additional guest appearances from Trippie Redd, Zhavia Ward, and Drakeo the Ruler. It follows Skies' previous album, Shelby (2019).

The album debuted and peaked at number 50 on the Billboard 200 with 15k album equivalent units.

== Background ==
In an interview with Complex, Skies elaborated on the album, explaining:

I just hope people take away from my album—just from me in general—is to just chase your dreams, and don't let nobody tell you what to do. I'm learning that still myself. I got a lot of people around me in my life tellin' me what I should do, what I shouldn't do… Do what you love, man. Life is too short.

The title of the album is a self-analysis of Skies, that nothing can distract him from doing what he is doing. The cover art depicts him in a room that is filled with items that are distracting, in which he sits down in a chair, thinking about his ideas. He chose Wiz Khalifa and Lil Durk to appear on the album as they are some of his most favorite artists. As with Shelby (2019), the project that was released before Unbothered, it only contains a few features for Skies to showcase his own talent.

== Release and promotion ==
Skies announced the album along with its title, cover art, and release date in an Instagram post on December 16, 2020. The track listing was revealed three days before its release, on January 19, 2021.

== Singles ==
Skies released the album's lead single, "Havin My Way", which features fellow American rapper Lil Durk, on March 4, 2020. It was followed by the second single, "Riot", which was released on May 14, 2020. The third single, "On Sight", was released on November 6, 2020. "Ok" was released as the fourth and final single on December 16, 2020. The lead single of the deluxe edition of the album, "My Baby", which features American singer Zhavia Ward, was released on April 29, 2021.

== Critical reception ==
Professional ratings
Review scores
Source	Rating
AllMusic	3/5 stars
Clash	7/10
Vinyl Chapters	3/5

Writing for Clash, Robin Murray felt that "every element on the album feels exact, placed with real precision"; Murray specifically praised the singles "Ok" and "Havin My Way", the latter of which features Lil Durk, opining that the album is an "inward journey" and the two singles exemplify that, while complimenting the songs "Trust Nobody", "Riot", and "Think Deep Don't Sink".

== Track listing ==
Unbothered track listing
No.	Title	Writer(s)	Producer(s)	Length
1.	"Fade Away"	Kimetrius Foose; Benjamin Sturdivant; Jake Wogan	Based1; Jakik	3:21
2.	"Take 5"	Foose; Sturdivant; Hagan Lange	Based1; Hagan	2:52
3.	"Excite Me" (featuring Wiz Khalifa)	Foose; Cameron Thomaz; Alex Petit	CashMoneyAP	2:51
4.	"Havin My Way" (featuring Lil Durk)	Foose; Durk Banks; Mattias Ringleb	Slim Pharaoh	3:31
5.	"Ok"	Foose; Tyron Douglas	Buddah Bless	2:35
6.	"Dead Broke"	Foose; Ringleb; Lange; Mitchell Cooper	Slim Pharaoh; Hagan; Sprite Lee	2:24
7.	"On Sight"	Foose; Ringleb; Garrison Webster	Slim Pharaoh; Vendr	2:41
8.	"Think Deep Don't Sink"	Foose; Sturdivant; Jack Gibson; Andrew Porter	Based1; Gibbo; Dru Armada	4:07
9.	"Red Wine & Jodeci"	Foose; Miguel Curtidor; Denis Berger; Andrew Cedar	Danny Wolf; Pvlace; Cedar	2:27
10.	"Locked Up"	Foose; Durrell Barbour; Connor Mannina	Rello; Steeze	3:05
11.	"Trust Nobody"	Foose; Vladislav Makhin; Noah Bridges	MVA Beats; Noahsaki	3:34
12.	"Riot"	Foose; Petit; Joshua Pinter; Alexander Mullarkey	CashMoneyAP; Neel & Alex	2:46
13.	"Sky High"	Foose; Curtidor; Liam McAlister; Nils Noehden	Danny Wolf; LMC; Nils	3:19
14.	"Mhmmm"	Foose; Tyler Williams; Kevin Gomringer; Tim Gomringer	T-Minus; Cubeatz	2:21
Total length:				42:00

Deluxe bonus tracks
No.	Title	Writer(s)	Producer(s)	Length
15.	"Ice Water" (featuring Trippie Redd)	Foose; Michael White IV; Sturdivant	Based1	3:00
16.	"Bloody Emotions"	Foose; Liam McAlister; James Jarvis; Jake Martin; Paul Gachie	LMC; JustAcoustic; Twoprxducers	2:41
17.	"My Baby" (featuring Zhavia Ward)	Foose; Carisa Ward; Petit; Luis Witkiewitz	CashMoneyAP; WizzleGotBeats	2:12
18.	"How You Feel"	Foose; McAlister; Josh O'Brien; Ryan LeRoy-Dyson	LMC; O'Brien; Dyce	3:04
19.	"Perfect Groove"	Foose; Mackenzie Edward	Ghxst	3:01
20.	"Posse" (featuring Drakeo the Ruler)	Foose; Darrell Caldwell; Ringleb; Martin Puschel	Slim Pharaoh; Minor2Go	2:49
21.	"Backup"	Foose; Ringleb; Lange	Slim Pharaoh; Hagan	2:37
Total length:				1:01:25

== Personnel ==
Credits adapted from Tidal.

=== Musicians ===
- Lil Skies – primary artist (all tracks)
- Wiz Khalifa – featured artist (track 3)
- Lil Durk – featured artist (track 4)
- Trippie Redd – featured artist (track 15)
- Zhavia Ward – featured artist (track 17)
- Drakeo the Ruler – featured artist (track 20)

=== Technical ===
- Samantha Kossoff – assistant mixing (tracks 5, 8–11, 14)
- Chris Athens – mastering (tracks 2, 3, 6–11, 13, 14)
- Neek – mixing (tracks 1–6, 12, 13), mastering (tracks 1, 4, 12)
- Joe Fitz – mixing (tracks 5, 7–11, 14), mastering (track 5)
- Based1 – programming (tracks 1, 2, 8)
- Jakik – programming (track 1)
- Hagan – programming (tracks 2, 6)
- CashMoneyAP – programming (tracks 3, 12)
- Slim Pharaoh – programming (tracks 4, 6, 7)
- Buddah Bless – programming (track 5)
- Sprite Lee – programming (track 6)
- Vendr – programming (track 7)
- Gibbo & Armada – programming (track 8)
- Pvlace – programming (track 9)
- Danny Wolf – programming (tracks 9, 13)
- Rello – programming (track 10)
- Steeze – programming (track 10)
- Noahsaki – programming (track 11)
- MVA Beats – programming (track 11)
- Neel & Alex – programming (track 12)
- Nils – programming (track 13)
- LMC – programming (track 13)
- T-Minus – programming (track 14)
- Cubeatz – programming (track 14)

== Charts ==
Chart performance for Unbothered
Chart (2021)	Peak position
Canadian Albums (Billboard)	48
Lithuanian Albums (AGATA)	60
US Billboard 200	50
US Top R&B/Hip-Hop Albums (Billboard)	29
