= Life of a Dark Rose =

Mixtape by Lil Skies
- Released: January 10, 2018
- Recorded: 2017
- Genre: Hip hop; trap
- Length: 41:00
- Label: All We Got; Atlantic
- Producer: Aguafina; CashMoneyAP; Ghxst; J Gramm; JR Hitmaker; Maaly Raw; Menoh Beats; Mono Beats; Nick Mira; Sidepce; Taz Taylor; The Martianz

Lil Skies chronology
Alone (2017)	Life of a Dark Rose (2018)	Shelby (2019)

Singles from Life of a Dark Rose
- 1. "Red Roses" Released: June 26, 2017; 2. "Signs of Jealousy" Released: September 6, 2017; 3. "Lust" Released: December 12, 2017; 4. "Nowadays" Released: December 17, 2017; 5. "Welcome to the Rodeo" Released: January 10, 2018

Life of a Dark Rose is the eighth mixtape by American rapper Lil Skies, released on January 10, 2018, by All We Got Entertainment and Atlantic Records. The mixtape debuted at number 23 and peaked at number ten on the US Billboard 200 albums chart. It features a sole guest appearance from Landon Cube who appears on two of the singles, "Red Roses" and "Nowadays".

== Singles ==
After the release of the single "Red Roses", the track "Lust" from the album, which was produced by CashMoneyAP and Menoh Beats, was released as a promotional single on December 15, 2017. A second single from the album, "Nowadays", was released in alongside a music video on December 17, 2017. After releasing "Red Roses" and "Lust" in the latter half of 2017, Lil Skies signed with Atlantic Records.

"Lust" has been certified gold, while "Red Roses" and "Nowadays" have been certified platinum.

The album itself was released on January 10, 2018 with 14 songs and only one guest appearance, from Landon Cube, who appears on two tracks: Nowadays" and "Red Roses".

== Critical reception ==
Pitchfork gave it a score of 6.4/10, with reviewer Evan Rytlewski writing that the lyrics were very simple in meaning or inane, and the music unoriginal. However, it also said the album was an "easygoing 40 minutes of sugary trap and mellow, blissfully hazy vibe music," which used sounds "of the moment without advancing them much." Not assigning it a number rating, Paul Simpson of Allmusic said the release "generally feels easy, relaxed, and uncomplicated, with hazy trap beats accompanied by Skies' straightforward, Auto-Tune-free rapping/singing." Uproxx gave it a positive review, saying in the headline that there was the "polish of a seasoned veteran" on the album, with Lil Skies "mixing in plenty of new school influence with his own smooth, polished delivery." Giving it a score of 3.2 of out 5, HipHopDX praised the tracks "Red Roses" and "Nowadays" as the highlights of the album, and said the rest of the tracks were "eh," even if "polished" with catchy beats and good production.

== Commercial performance ==
Life of a Dark Rose debuted at number 23 on the US Billboard 200, also opening at number 13 on the US Top Rap Albums chart and number 16 on the US Top R&B/Hip-Hop Albums chart. The song "Nowadays" from the album, featuring Landon Cube, reached number 85 on the US Billboard Hot 100 for songs by January 17, 2018. It also reached number 33 on the US Hot R&B/Hip-Hop Songs chart, with the album's song "Red Roses" also on that chart, reaching number 36 by January 17, 2018. Uproxx said that the climbing ranking from the week before in the charts was spiked when he released the music video for "Nowadays.

In January 2018, the album reached the top ten of Billboard's Top R&B/Hip-Hop Albums chart, jumping from number 16 to number six in its second week, and reaching six as of January 25, 2018. Billboard wrote about the singles at that point, "Nowadays" was 22 on the Hot R&B/Hip-Hop Songs chart and "Roses" was 28.

On November 9, 2018, the album was certified gold by the Recording Industry Association of America (RIAA) for combined sales and album-equivalent units of over 500,000 units. By December 2018, Life of a Dark Rose had sold 652,000 album-equivalent units in the United States. It was eventually certified Platinum in February 2020.

== Track listing ==
No.	Title	Writer(s)	Producer(s)	Length
1.	"Welcome to the Rodeo"	Kimetrius Foose; Danny Snodgrass	Taz Taylor; Mono Beats	2:49
2.	"The Clique"	Foose; Jamaal Henry	Maaly Raw	2:26
3.	"Red Roses" (featuring Landon Cube)	Foose; Landon Cube	Menoh Beats	4:23
4.	"Lust"	Foose; Alex Petit	CashMoneyAP	2:36
5.	"Cloudy Skies"	Foose; Brian Aubert; Christopher Guanlao; Joe Lester; Nikki Monninger; Jason Luu	Ghxst	3:13
6.	"Signs of Jealousy"	Foose	Menoh Beats	2:58
7.	"Big Money"	Foose; Julian Gramma	J Gramm	2:35
8.	"Tell My Haters"	Foose; Snodgrass	Taz Taylor; JR Hitmaker	2:00
9.	"Boss Up"	Foose	Aguafina	2:36
10.	"Garden"	Foose	Menoh Beats	3:05
11.	"Lettuce Sandwich"	Foose	Menoh Beats	3:15
12.	"Strictly Business"	Foose; Snodgrass; Nicholas Mira	Taz Taylor; Nick Mira; Menoh Beats	2:39
13.	"Kill4u"	Foose; Snodgrass; Jordan Hutchins	Taz Taylor; Sidepce; The Martianz	3:01
14.	"Nowadays" (featuring Landon Cube)	Foose; Cube; Petit	CashmoneyAP; Mono Beats	3:24
Total length:				41:00

== Charts ==
=== Weekly charts ===
Weekly chart performance for Life of a Dark Rose
Chart (2018)	Peak position
Australian Albums (ARIA)	92
Belgian Albums (Ultratop Flanders)	115
Canadian Albums (Billboard)	17
Dutch Albums (Album Top 100)	94
Finnish Albums (Suomen virallinen lista)	43
New Zealand Albums (RMNZ)	38
US Billboard 200	10
US Top R&B/Hip-Hop Albums (Billboard)	6
US Top Rap Albums (Billboard)	5

=== Year-end charts ===
2019 year-end chart performance for Life of a Dark Rose
Chart (2018)	Position
Canadian Albums (Billboard)	46
Icelandic Albums (Plötutíóindi)	93
US Billboard 200	44
US Top R&B/Hip-Hop Albums (Billboard)	26

2019 year-end chart performance for Life of a Dark Rose
Chart (2019)	Position
US Billboard 200	197

== Certifications ==
Region	Certification	Certified units/sales
Canada (Music Canada)	Gold	40,000^{‡}
Denmark (IFPI Danmark)	Gold	10,000^{‡}
United Kingdom (BPI)	Silver	60,000^{‡}
United States (RIAA)	Platinum	1,000,000^{‡}
^{‡} Sales+streaming figures based on certification alone.
