= Shelby (album) =

Studio album by Lil Skies
- Released: February 28, 2019
- Recorded: 2017–2019
- Genre: Hip hop; trap; emo rap
- Length: 42:56
- Label: All We Got; Atlantic
- Producer: Based1; CashMoneyAP; Cris Dinero; Cubeatz; Cvre; Danny Wolf; Dilip; Dru Armada; Ill Wayno; LNK; Mario Petersen; Menoh Beats; MVA Beats; Otxhello; Palazzo Beats; VinnyxProd; Yugi Boi

Lil Skies chronology
Life of a Dark Rose (2018)	Shelby (2019)	Unbothered (2021)

Singles from Shelby
- 1. "Name in the Sand" Released: June 19, 2018; 2. "I" Released: March 1, 2019

Professional ratings
Review scores
Source	Rating
Highsnobiety	3.5/5
HipHopDX	3.6/5

Shelby is the debut studio album by American rapper Lil Skies. It was released on February 28, 2019, by All We Got Entertainment and Atlantic Records. The album features guest appearances from Gucci Mane, Landon Cube, and Gunna. It peaked at number five on the US Billboard 200. The album is named after his mother. It serves as the follow-up to his breakthrough mixtape, Life of a Dark Rose (2018).

== Background ==
Lil Skies dedicated the album to his mother, who appears in the album title and cover. It describes the hard times he has gone through with the help of his fans.

== Release and promotion ==
On February 27, 2019, a day before the album was released, Lil Skies revealed the title and cover art of the album through Twitter.

== Singles ==
On January 31, 2019, Skies released the lead single from the project, "Name in the Sand". On March 1, 2019, "I" was released as the second and final single along with the album, debuting at number 39 on the Billboard Hot 100, becoming the highest-charting single of Skies' career.

== Commercial performance ==
Shelby debuted at number five on the US Billboard 200 chart, earning 54,000 album-equivalent units (including 6,000 copies as pure album sales) in its first week. This became Lil Skies' second US top-ten album on the chart, surpassing his debut mixtape and first project, Life of a Dark Rose (2018), which went at number 10 on the chart. The album also accumulated a total of 68.6 million on-demand audio streams that week. On January 21, 2021, the day before Skies released the follow-up to the album, his second studio album, Unbothered, the album was certified gold by the Recording Industry Association of America (RIAA) for combined sales and album-equivalent units of over 500,000 units in the United States.

== Track listing ==
No.	Title	Writer(s)	Producer(s)	Length
1.	"I"	Kimetrius Foose; Miguel Curtidor; Othello Houston; Timothy Gomringer; Kevin Gomringer	Danny Wolf; Otxhello; Cubeatz	3:01
2.	"Bad Girls" (featuring Gucci Mane)	Foose; Radric Davis; Curtidor; Houston; Dilip Venkatesh	Danny Wolf; Otxhello; Dilip	3:39
3.	"Breathe"	Foose; Benjamin Sturdivant; Vladislav Mokshin; Pascal Punz	Based1; MVA Beats; Palazzo Beats	2:34
4.	"Nowadays, Pt. 2" (featuring Landon Cube)	Foose; Landon Cube; Curtidor; Venkatesh; Daniel Rothenberg	Danny Wolf; Dilip; Yugi Boi	3:41
5.	"Flooded"	Foose; Sturdivant; Leon Krol; Mario Petersen	Based1; LNK; Petersen	1:55
6.	"Blue Strips"	Foose; Sturdivant	Based1	3:27
7.	"Stop the Madness" (featuring Gunna)	Foose; Sergio Kitchens; Sturdivant; Andrew Porter	Based1; Dru Armada	4:14
8.	"Ok 4 Now"	Foose; Curtidor; Houston	Danny Wolf; Otxhello	2:44
9.	"When I'm Wasted"	Foose; Alex Petit; Rui Wen Pan; Jun Ha Kim	CashMoneyAP; VinnyxProd; Cvre	3:21
10.	"Mansion"	Foose; Cristian Maldonado	Cris Dinero	2:33
11.	"Through the Motions"	Foose; Amin Elamin	Menoh Beats	3:10
12.	"Highs and Lows"	Foose; Petit; Dwayne Shippy	CashMoneyAP; Ill Wayno	2:54
13.	"Name in the Sand"	Foose; Elamin	Menoh Beats	2:48
14.	"No Rainy Days"	Foose; Elamin	Menoh Beats	2:55
Total length:				42:56

== Charts ==
=== Weekly charts ===
Chart (2019)	Peak position
Australian Albums (ARIA)	20
Austrian Albums (Ö3 Austria)	56
Belgian Albums (Ultratop Flanders)	57
Canadian Albums (Billboard)	7
Dutch Albums (Album Top 100)	11
Irish Albums (IRMA)	25
Latvian Albums (LAIPA)	3
Lithuanian Albums (AGATA)	5
New Zealand Albums (RMNZ)	21
Swedish Albums (Sverigetopplistan)	27
Swiss Albums (Schweizer Hitparade)	93
UK Albums (OCC)	30
US Billboard 200	5
US Top R&B/Hip-Hop Albums (Billboard)	2
US Top Rap Albums (Billboard)	2

=== Year-end charts ===
Chart (2019)	Position
US Billboard 200	194
US Top R&B/Hip-Hop Albums (Billboard)	81

== Certifications ==
Region	Certification	Certified units/sales
United States (RIAA)	Gold	500,000^{‡}
^{‡} Sales+streaming figures based on certification alone.
