= Lil Skies =

American rapper and singer-songwriter (born 1998)

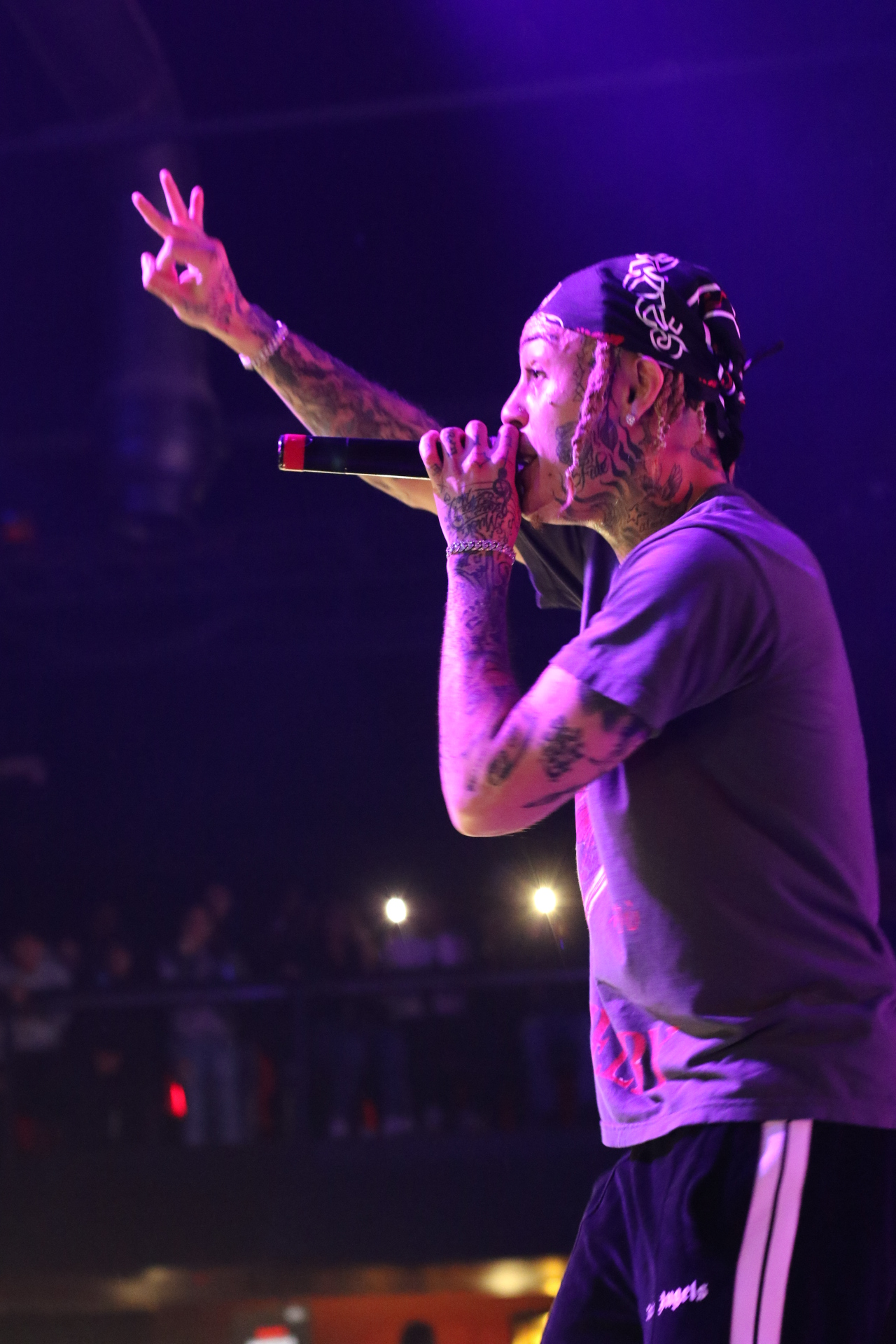
- Lil Skies performing at Fillmore Auditorium in 2019

Background information
- Born: Kimetrius Christopher Foose; August 4, 1998 (age 28); Chambersburg, Pennsylvania, U.S.
- Origin: Chambersburg, Pennsylvania, U.S.
- Genres: Hip hop; trap; emo rap; SoundCloud rap; pop rap
- Occupations: Rapper; singer; songwriter
- Years active: 2012–present
- Labels: Roc Nation; All We Got; Atlantic
- Partner(s): Jacey Fugate (2018–present; engaged)
- Children: 1
- Website: lilskiesofficial.com

Kimetrius Christopher Foose (born August 4, 1998), known by his stage name Lil Skies, is an American rapper and singer from Waynesboro, Pennsylvania. He signed with Atlantic Records in 2017 to release the singles "I", "Nowadays", and "Red Roses." The songs peaked at numbers 39, 55, and 69 on the Billboard Hot 100, respectively. His eighth mixtape and major label debut, Life of a Dark Rose (2018), peaked at number ten on the Billboard 200 and received platinum certification by the Recording Industry Association of America (RIAA). His debut studio album, Shelby (2019), and its follow-up Unbothered (2021), peaked at numbers five and 50 on the chart, respectively. He has since released the mixtape “Out Ur Body Music” in March 2024, and the album “Evolution of the Rose” in June 2025, and his new album “LS4*” will be released in 2026.

== Early life ==
Kimetrius Christopher Foose was born August 4, 1998, in Chambersburg, Pennsylvania. He began freestyling at age three. He was introduced to music by his father, Michael Burton Jr., a hip hop artist formerly known as Dark Skies, now as BurntMan, and his mother Shelby Foose. Foose's stage name is a play on his father's. Foose and his family moved to Waynesboro, Pennsylvania, when he was in third grade. When he was 11, his father was injured in a workplace chemical explosion at the Rust-Oleum plant near Williamsport, Maryland.

== Career ==
=== 2016–2018: Career beginnings and Life of a Dark Rose ===
Skies claims he used to have to sell marijuana and work "little jobs" to pay for studio time and music videos. He also worked at a McDonald's and a Japanese restaurant in his hometown. In the meantime, he would spend the summer at a relative's house; it was at that point in time he worked in collaboration with his dad on his first project released on August 14, entitled, "Birth of Skies Vol. 1". Foose and his father would write an album the following year, Father-Son Talk, discussing the recovery process. Foose graduated from Waynesboro Area Senior High School in 2016 and briefly attended Shippensburg University of Pennsylvania before dropping out to focus on his rap career. His musical inspirations are Lil Wayne, Eminem, Wiz Khalifa, The Offspring, Punchline, MxPx, Audiovent and 50 Cent.

In October 2016, Foose opened for Fetty Wap at Shippensburg University and later released his first mixtape, Alone, in January 2017. In July 2017, he released two songs, "Red Roses" featuring Landon Cube and "Off The Goop" featuring Sprite Lee. He would later release other songs that year, including "Rude" and "Signs of Jealousy."

Foose's repertoire of singles caught the attention of Atlantic Records who partnered with his own label, All We Got. He released his first major label mixtape, Life of a Dark Rose, on January 10, 2018. The mixtape debuted at #23 on the Billboard 200 chart and went on to peak at #10. The songs "Nowadays" and "Red Roses" (both featuring Landon Cube) debuted on the Billboard Hot 100 at #85 and #98 respectively and have since peaked at #55 and #69 (also respectively). He also toured nationally with Lil Uzi Vert in 2017 and began his "Life of a Dark Rose" tour in 2018, but had to end the tour early due to pneumonia. On May 4, 2018, the music video for "Lust" was released; the song peaked at number 87 on the Billboard Hot 100 and received platinum certification by the RIAA. On May 31, he released "I Know You", featuring Yung Pinch, which peaked at 79 on the Billboard Hot 100 and received gold certification by the RIAA.

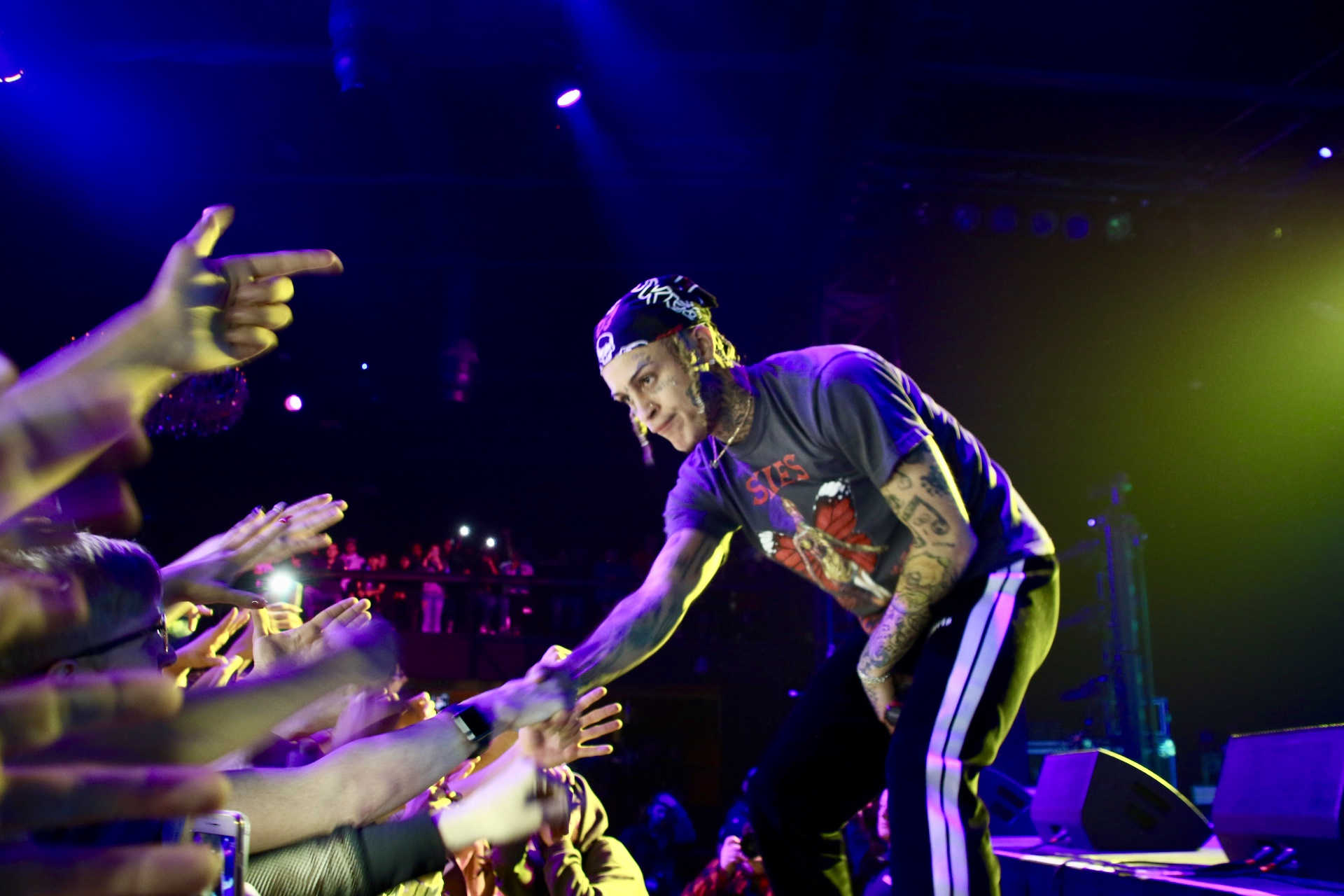
Lil Skies performing at the Fillmore Auditorium in May 2019

=== 2019: Shelby ===
On March 1, 2019, Lil Skies released his album Shelby, named after his mother, while simultaneously debuting the music video for lead single "I". He made a short documentary for the album on his YouTube channel by interviewing her and surprising her during it by telling her he was going to name it after her. On May 21, 2019, Lil Skies released a video for "Breathe", a song from his album, Shelby.

=== 2020–2022: Unbothered and standalone singles ===
On March 4, 2020, Skies released the song "Havin My Way", which features close friend Lil Durk and serves as the lead single from his second studio album, Unbothered (2021). It was followed by the second single, "Riot", which was released on May 14, 2020. "On Sight", the third single, was released on November 6, 2020. "Ok", the fourth and final single, was released December 16, 2020. Skies released "My Baby" with American Singer Zhavia Ward, the lead single to the Unbothered Deluxe, on April 29, 2021.

Skies released multiple standalone singles during his Unbothered singles rollout. "Fidget" was released April 20, 2020. On July 10, 2020, he released the track "Red & Yellow" from the Road to Fast 9 mixtape. "Lightbeam", featuring American Rapper NoCap, was released July 23, 2020.

After Unbothered released, Skies released "Play This At My Funeral", featuring Landon Cube, on March 25, 2022, and "Rage!", released November 27, 2022.

=== 2023–present: Independence, Out Ur Body Music and The Evolution of The Rose ===
On February 21, 2023, Skies released "Make A Toast", his final release under Atlantic Records. Skies announced he had left the label via Instagram Live, and subsequently released several singles as an independent artist for the first time since 2017.

Skies is featured on Lyrical Lemonade's debut album All Is Yellow, on the song "This My Life" alongside Lil Tecca and The Kid Laroi. The song charted Number 19 on the Bubbling Under Hot 100, 49 on Hot R&B/Hip-Hop Songs and number 20 on the Official New Zealand Music Chart.

Skies released the single "Thousands" on February 9, 2024, marking his first solo release of the year. "Thousands" acted as the lead single to his mixtape Out Ur Body Music. "Death", the second single, dropped on March 8. The eight-track mixtape was released on March 29 and was the first full-length project from Skies since Unbothered (2021).

Since the release of Out Ur Body Music Skies released singles "Runnin Through The Fire" on July 2, "Pain" on July 5 and ended 2024 with "Pull The Trigger" alongside Masked Wolf on November 6, which featured on his debut album The Devil Wears Prada But God Wears Gucci. Skies also featured on singles "Givenchy" and "Counter-Strike" with Apel8.

Skies released "High Maintenance" on January 10, 2025, marking his first solo release of the year and in 6 months. Skies featured on "Halo" with Iann Dior as part of his third EP Nothings Ever Good Enough II and well as Yung Pinch's "Playboy Party".

Skies released "2Much 2Fast", featuring Landon Cube, on February 28, 2025, the lead single to his third studio album The Evolution of the Rose. The song was produced by John Feldmann He then released "Falling Backwards" on April 11, 2025, the second single to the album also produced by Feldmann and RJ Pasin. Both singles adopted a Pop Rock/Rap sound. Skies took to Instagram to announce the album and it's presale. Skies released The Evolution of The Rose on June 27, 2025. The album featured appearances from Landon Cube and Ravenna Golden. Skies would close out 2025 releasing "Monster" featuring Landon Cube on October 31.

Skies began 2026 by releasing "Make A Wish" on April 10 followed by "No Fear" on May 1 and "3rd Eye" on November 6. Skies would also feature on "Till The End" with CelNoLackin and "Sensei" alongside Mightyy!

== Personal life ==
Foose still resides in Waynesboro, Pennsylvania. In July 2019, Foose and his longtime girlfriend, Jacey Fugate, had a son, also named Kimetrius. Foose and Fugate got engaged in April 2025.

Foose cites his own song "Red Roses" as his personal favorite song, referring to the musical combination with him and Landon Cube as "epic". He cites Lil Wayne as his biggest music inspiration.

Foose now tries to avoid drugs as much as possible after seeing it negatively impact the lives of his old friends.

In an interview, Skies claims if he was not rapping, he would like to do some "Bear Grylls type, outdoor stuff" and that his favorite hobby is fishing.

In 2026, Foose revealed that he had applied at a Dollar General due to a bout of six months without show bookings and had spent most of his savings.

=== Legal issue ===
Foose was arrested on May 20, 2024, for an alleged hit and run on another vehicle. Foose allegedly sped off after the accident and did not exchange insurance information with the other driver. The inmate records at Franklin County Jail reveal Foose has since been released but the status of his bail and the potential case have yet to be commented on by Foose or the Police Department.

== Discography ==
- Shelby (2019)
- Unbothered (2021)
- The Evolution of the Rose (2025)
