= Lil Tecca discography =

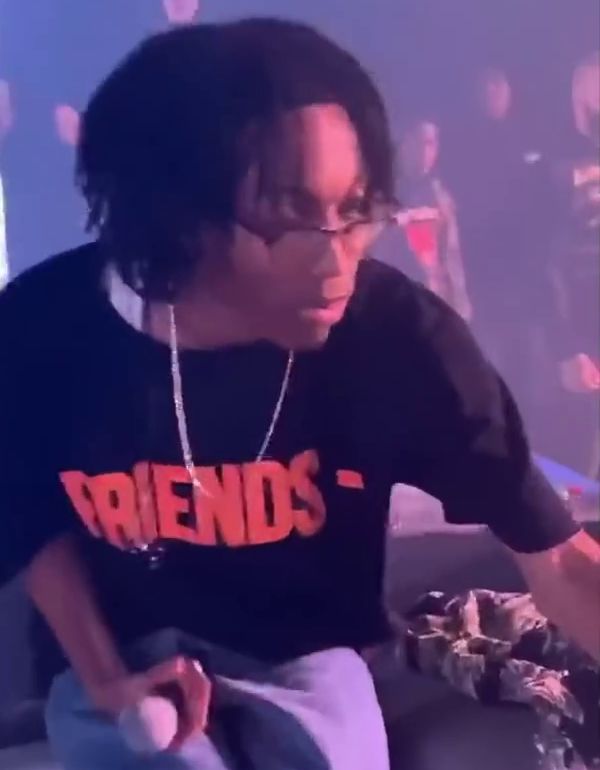
- Lil Tecca performing in 2019
- Studio albums: 5
- Singles: 32
- Mixtapes: 2
- Compilations: 4

The discography of the American rapper Lil Tecca consists of five studio albums, two mixtapes, and 32 singles (including five as a featured artist).

== Albums ==
=== Studio albums ===
List of studio albums, with selected chart positions
| Title | Details | Peak chart positions | | | | | | | | |
| Title | Details | US | US R&B/HH | US Rap | AUS | BEL (FL) | CAN | IRE | NLD | UK |
|---|---|---|---|---|---|---|---|---|---|---|
| Virgo World | Released: September 18, 2020; Label: Galactic, Republic; Formats: CD, digital download, streaming | 10 | 7 | 7 | 61 | 102 | 6 | 38 | 39 | 42 |
| We Love You Tecca 2 | Released: August 27, 2021; Label: Galactic, Republic; Formats: CD, digital download, streaming | 10 | 6 | 5 | 49 | 129 | 9 | 98 | 60 | 83 |
| Tec | Released: September 22, 2023; Label: Galactic, Republic; Formats: CD, LP, digital download, streaming | 11 | 5 | 4 | — | 68 | 13 | 84 | 69 | 51 |
| Plan A | Released: September 20, 2024; Label: Galactic, Republic | 9 | 2 | 2 | — | 86 | 20 | 83 | 53 | 66 |
| Dopamine | Released: June 13, 2025; Label: Galactic, Republic | 3 | 1 | 1 | 28 | 43 | 2 | 26 | 20 | 17 |
"—" denotes a recording that did not chart or was not released in that territory.

=== Mixtapes ===
List of mixtapes, with selected chart positions
| Title | Details | Peak chart positions | | | | | Certifications |
| Title | Details | US | AUS | CAN | NZ | UK | Certifications |
|---|---|---|---|---|---|---|---|
| Tecca & Friends | Released: 2018; Label: Self-released; Format: Digital download, streaming | — | — | — | — | — | |
| We Love You Tecca | Released: August 30, 2019; Label: Galactic, Republic; Formats: CD, LP, digital download, streaming | 4 | 13 | 3 | 14 | 15 | RIAA: Platinum; IFPI DEN: Platinum; BPI: Gold |
"—" denotes a recording that did not chart or was not released in that territory.

=== Compilation albums ===
List of compilation albums, with selected details
| Title | Details |
|---|---|
| Virgo Sun | Released: November 20, 2020; Label: Galactic, Republic; Formats: Digital download, streaming |
| Virgo Rising | Released: November 27, 2020; Label: Galactic, Republic; Formats: Digital download, streaming |
| Virgo Moon | Released: December 4, 2020; Label: Galactic, Republic; Formats: Digital download, streaming |
| Crunch Time | Released: December 11, 2020; Label: Galactic, Republic; Formats: Digital download, streaming |

== Singles ==
=== As lead artist ===
List of singles as lead artist, with selected chart positions and certifications, showing year released and album name
| Title | Year | Peak chart positions | | | | | | | | | | Certifications | Album |
| Title | Year | US | US R&B/HH | US Rap | AUS | CAN | GRE Int. | IRE | NZ | NZ Hot | UK | Certifications | Album |
|---|---|---|---|---|---|---|---|---|---|---|---|---|---|
| "Love Me" | 2018 | 97 | 41 | — | — | 72 | — | 73 | — | — | 66 | RIAA: 2× Platinum; AFP: Platinum; ARIA: Gold; BPI: Gold; MC: Gold; RMNZ: Platinum; IFPI DEN: Gold | We Love You Tecca |
| "Ransom" (solo or remix with Juice Wrld) | 2019 | 4 | 2 | 2 | 8 | 2 | 2 | 3 | 2 | 7 | 7 | RIAA: 9× Platinum; ARIA: 2× Platinum; BPI: 2× Platinum; MC: 6× Platinum; IFPI DEN: Platinum; RMNZ: 5× Platinum; SNEP: Gold; BVMI: Gold; ZPAV: Platinum; AFP: Platinum | We Love You Tecca |
| "Did It Again" | 2019 | 64 | 24 | 21 | — | 34 | 63 | 89 | — | — | 84 | RIAA: 2× Platinum; BPI: Silver; MC: Gold; AFP: Platinum; RMNZ: Gold | We Love You Tecca |
| "Glo Up" | 2019 | — | — | — | — | — | — | — | — | — | — | | We Love You Tecca |
| "Somebody" (with Internet Money and A Boogie wit da Hoodie) | 2019 | 96 | 44 | — | — | 54 | — | 93 | — | 16 | 75 | RIAA: Platinum; MC: Platinum | B4 the Storm |
| "Why U Look Mad" | 2019 | — | — | — | — | — | — | — | — | — | — | | Non-album singles |
| "IDK" | 2020 | — | — | — | — | — | — | — | — | — | — | | Non-album singles |
| "All Star" (featuring Lil Tjay) | 2020 | — (Note: "All Star" did not enter the Billboard Hot 100, but peaked at number 18 on the Bubbling Under Hot 100 chart.) | — | — | — | — | — | — | — | 39 | — | | Non-album singles |
| "Out of Love" (featuring Internet Money) | 2020 | — | — | — | — | — | — | — | — | 15 | — | RIAA: Platinum; BPI: Silver; RMNZ: Gold | Virgo World |
| "Royal Rumble" | 2020 | — | — | — | — | — | — | — | — | — | — | | Virgo World |
| "Our Time" | 2020 | — | — | — | — | — | — | — | — | — | — | RIAA: Platinum; RMNZ: Gold | Virgo World |
| "Dolly" (with Lil Uzi Vert) | 2020 | 80 | 26 | 25 | — | 63 | — | — | — | 15 | — | | Virgo World |
| "Jetski" (with Internet Money and Lil Mosey) | 2021 | — (Note: "Jetski" did not enter the Billboard Hot 100, but peaked at number 19 on the Bubbling Under Hot 100 chart.) | — | — | — | 88 | — | — | — | 16 | — | | Non-album single |
| "Show Me Up" | 2021 | — (Note: "Show Me Up" did not enter the Billboard Hot 100, but peaked at number 21 on the Bubbling Under Hot 100 chart.) | 50 | — | — | — | — | — | — | 22 | — | | We Love You Tecca 2 |
| "Never Left" | 2021 | 56 | 24 | 19 | — | 30 | — | 42 | — | 4 | 50 | RIAA: Platinum; MC: Gold; RMNZ: Gold | We Love You Tecca 2 |
| "Money on Me" | 2021 | — | — | — | — | — | — | — | — | — | — | | We Love You Tecca 2 |
| "Repeat It" (with Gunna) | 2021 | 80 | 28 | 20 | — | 39 | — | — | — | 13 | — | MC: Gold | We Love You Tecca 2 |
| "Prada" (with 24kGoldn) | 2021 | — | — | — | — | 71 | — | — | — | 18 | — | | El Dorado (deluxe) |
| "Fallin" | 2022 | — | — | — | — | — | — | — | — | 36 | — | | Non-album single |
| "She Want Some More" (with Internet Money featuring Ken Carson) | 2022 | — | — | — | — | — | — | — | — | — | — | | We All We Got |
| "Faster" | 2022 | — | — | — | — | — | — | — | — | 22 | — | | Non-album singles |
| "Treesha" | 2022 | — | — | — | — | — | — | — | — | 37 | — | | Non-album singles |
| "Blessing" | 2022 | — | — | — | — | — | — | — | — | — | — | | Non-album singles |
| "Poppin" (with Rich Amiri) | 2023 | — | — | — | — | — | — | — | — | — | — | | Evolution |
| "Need Me" | 2023 | — | — | — | — | — | — | — | — | — | — | | Tec |
| "500lbs" | 2023 | 51 | 14 | 11 | — | 34 | — | — | — | 17 | — | RIAA: 2× Platinum; MC: Gold; RMNZ: Platinum | Tec |
| "Hvn on Earth" (with Kodak Black) | 2023 | 88 | 30 | — | — | 69 | — | — | — | 17 | — | | Tec |
| "Dead or Alive" | 2023 | — (Note: "Dead or Alive" did not enter the Billboard Hot 100, but peaked at number four on the Bubbling Under Hot 100 chart.) | 38 | — | — | 80 | — | — | — | 24 | — | | Tec |
| "Down with Me" (Note: Only on the bonus edition of Tec) | 2024 | — (Note: "Down with Me" did not enter the Billboard Hot 100, but peaked at number four on the Bubbling Under Hot 100 chart.) | 35 | — | — | 59 | — | — | — | 4 | — | | Tec |
| "Number 2" | 2024 | — | 45 | — | — | — | — | — | — | 18 | — | | Plan A |
| "Never Last" | 2024 | — | — | — | — | — | — | — | — | 29 | — | | Plan A |
| "Taste" | 2024 | — | — | — | — | — | — | — | — | 31 | — | | Plan A |
| "Bad Time" | 2024 | — (Note: "Bad Time" did not enter the Billboard Hot 100, but peaked at number 10 on the Bubbling Under Hot 100 chart.) | 35 | — | — | — | — | — | — | 17 | — | | Plan A |
| "Dark Thoughts" | 2025 | 28 | 9 | 6 | 22 | 22 | — | 34 | 11 | 7 | 20 | RIAA: Platinum; BPI: Silver; RMNZ: Platinum | Dopamine |
| "Owa Owa" | 2025 | 50 | 11 | 6 | 99 | 46 | — | 86 | — | 4 | 76 | | Dopamine |
"—" denotes a recording that did not chart or was not released in that territory.

=== As featured artist ===
List of singles as featured artist, with selected chart positions and certifications, showing year released and album name
| Title | Year | Peak chart positions | | Certifications | Album |
| Title | Year | AUS | NZ Hot | Certifications | Album |
|---|---|---|---|---|---|
| "Memories in My Head" (Icyslug featuring Lougotcash and Lil Tecca) | 2019 | — | — | | Trap Jew |
| "Diva" (The Kid Laroi featuring Lil Tecca) | 2020 | 76 | 6 | RIAA: Platinum; ARIA: Gold; BPI: Silver; RMNZ: Platinum | Non-album single |
| "Come Through" (Bankrol Hayden featuring Lil Tecca) | 2021 | — | — | | 29 |
| "Flowers (Say My Name) (Remix)" (ArrDee featuring Lil Tecca) | 2022 | — | — | | Non-album singles |
| "Head Doctor (Remix)" (NoCap featuring Lil Tecca) | 2023 | — | — | | Non-album singles |
"—" denotes a recording that did not chart or was not released in that territory.

== Other charted and certified songs ==
List of songs, with selected chart positions, showing year released and album name
| Title | Year | Peak chart positions | | | | Certifications | Album |
| Title | Year | US | US R&B/HH | CAN | NZ Hot | Certifications | Album |
|---|---|---|---|---|---|---|---|
| "Shots" | 2019 | 84 | 35 | 54 | 20 | MC: Gold | We Love You Tecca |
| "Out of Luck" | 2019 | 80 | 32 | 79 | 27 | | We Love You Tecca |
| "Left, Right" | 2019 | — (Note: "Left, Right" did not enter the Billboard Hot 100, but peaked at number 18 on the Bubbling Under Hot 100 chart.) | — | — | 39 | | We Love You Tecca |
| "Amigo" | 2019 | — (Note: "Amigo" did not enter the Billboard Hot 100, but peaked at number 13 on the Bubbling Under Hot 100 chart.) | 49 | — | 28 | RIAA: Platinum | We Love You Tecca |
| "When You Down" (with Polo G featuring Lil Durk) | 2020 | 90 | 32 | 77 | 24 | | Virgo World |
| "Seaside" (featuring Iann Dior) | 2021 | — | — | — | 38 | | We Love You Tecca 2 |
| "Choppa Shoot the Loudest" (with Chief Keef featuring Trippie Redd) | 2021 | — (Note: "Choppa Shoot the Loudest" did not enter the Billboard Hot 100, but peaked at number 14 on the Bubbling Under Hot 100 chart.) | — | — | 30 | | We Love You Tecca 2 |
| "Lot of Me" | 2021 | — (Note: "Lot of Me" did not enter the Billboard Hot 100, but peaked at number 15 on the Bubbling Under Hot 100 chart.) | — | 95 | — | RIAA: Platinum; MC: Gold; RMNZ: Gold | We Love You Tecca 2 |
| "Fell in Love" (with Ken Carson) | 2023 | — (Note: "Fell in Love" did not enter the Billboard Hot 100, but peaked at number 18 on the Bubbling Under Hot 100 chart.) | — | — | 25 | | Tec |
| "This My Life" (Lyrical Lemonade featuring Lil Tecca, The Kid Laroi, and Lil Skies) | 2024 | — (Note: "This My Life" did not chart on the Billboard Hot 100, but did peak at number 19 on the Bubbling Under Hot 100 Singles chart.) | 49 | — | 20 | | All Is Yellow |
| "120" | 2024 | — (Note: "120" did not enter the Billboard Hot 100, but peaked at number 15 on the Bubbling Under Hot 100 chart.) | 48 | — | 20 | | Plan A |
| "I Can't Let Go" (with Don Toliver) | 2024 | — (Note: "I Can't Let Go" did not enter the Billboard Hot 100, but peaked at number 18 on the Bubbling Under Hot 100 chart.) | 50 | — | 9 | | Plan A |
| "Half the Plot" | 2025 | 78 | 20 | 79 | 7 | | Dopamine |
| "The Truth" | 2025 | — | 31 | — | — | | Dopamine |
| "Favorite Lie" | 2025 | — (Note: "Favorite Lie" did not enter the Billboard Hot 100, but peaked at number 9 on the Bubbling Under Hot 100 chart.) | 25 | — | 12 | | Dopamine |
| "Hollywood" | 2025 | — | 38 | — | — | | Dopamine |
| "X Factor" | 2025 | — | 45 | — | — | | Dopamine |
| "Don't Rush" | 2025 | — | 47 | — | — | | Dopamine |
| "Boys Don't Cry" | 2025 | — | 30 | — | — | | Dopamine |
| "On Your Own" | 2025 | — | 41 | — | — | | Dopamine |
| "Tic Tac Toe" (with Ken Carson) | 2025 | — (Note: "Tic Tac Toe" did not enter the Billboard Hot 100, but peaked at number 18 on the Bubbling Under Hot 100 chart.) | 28 | — | 15 | | Dopamine |
"—" denotes a recording that did not chart or was not released in that territory.

== Guest appearances ==
List of appearances on other songs, showing year released and album name
| Title | Year | Other artist(s) | Album |
|---|---|---|---|
| "Mavericks" | 2019 | Danny Wolf, WAV | Night of the Wolf |
| "How I was Raised" | 2020 | Trippie Redd | A Love Letter To You 4 (Deluxe) |
| "Dime Pa Que" | 2020 | Natanael Cano | Trap Tumbado |
| "Rover (Remix)" | 2020 | S1mba | Non-album remix |
| "JLO" | 2020 | Internet Money | B4 the Storm |
| "Bussin' Bussin'" | 2021 | None | F9: The Fast Saga |
| "Gametime" | 2021 | Aminé | Space Jam: A New Legacy |
| "Virgo World" | 2021 | Lil Yachty | Birthday Mix 6 |
| "Good Life" | 2021 | TyFontaine | Ascension (Deluxe) - Virtual World 2 |
| "Anti-Hero" | 2022 | Lil Wayne | Sorry 4 The Wait (Re-Release) |
| "Mission Impossible" | 2022 | Coi Leray | Trendsetter |
| "Let Love Go" | 2022 | Mabel | About Last Night... |
| "Falsetto" | 2022 | Internet Money | We All We Got |
| "This My Life" | 2024 | Lyrical Lemonade, Lil Skies, The Kid Laroi | All Is Yellow |
