= Number 2 (Lil Tecca song) =

Single by Lil Tecca

from the album Plan A
- B-side: "Never Last"
- Released: May 3, 2024
- Genre: Hip-hop
- Length: 2:17
- Label: Galactic; Republic
- Songwriters: Tyler-Justin Sharpe; Danny Snodgrass Jr.; Konstantin Pepelov; Rio Leyva; Steven Giron
- Producers: Rio Levya; Venny; 1keep; Taz Taylor

Music video
- "Number 2 / Never Last" on YouTube

"Number 2" is a song by American rapper Lil Tecca and the lead single from his 2024 album Plan A.

== Charts ==
Chart performance for "Number 2"
Chart (2024)	Peak position
New Zealand Hot Singles (RMNZ)	18
US Hot R&B/Hip-Hop Songs (Billboard)	45
