= Repeat It =

Repeat It may refer to:

- "Repeat It" (Lil Tecca and Gunna song), 2021
- "Repeat It" (Martin Garrix and Ed Sheeran song), 2026
