= Out of Love =

Out of Love may refer to:

- Out of Love (1988 film), a British television film by Tom Clarke
- Out of love (2009 film), a film by Danish director Birgitte Stærmose
- Out of Love (2016 film), a film by Paloma Aguilera Valdebenito selected for the Riviera International Film Festival
- Out of Love (2025 film), a French film by Nathan Ambrosioni
- Out of Love (Australian TV series), a 1974 Australian TV series starring Patsy King
- Out of Love (Indian TV series), a 2019 Indian television series
- Out of Love (album), a 2011 studio album by Mister Heavenly
- "Out of Love", a song by Toto from the 1990 album Past to Present 1977–1990
- "Out of Love", a song by Five for Fighting from the 2000 album America Town
- "Out of Love", a song by Smash Mouth from the 2012 album Magic
- "Out of Love" (Alessia Cara song), from the 2019 album The Pains of Growing
- "Out of Love" (Lil Tecca song), from the 2020 album Virgo World
