= Love Me (Lil Tecca song) =

Single by Lil Tecca

Single by Lil Tecca

from the album We Love You Tecca
- Released: October 29, 2018
- Length: 1:57
- Label: Galactic; Republic; Universal Music Group
- Songwriters: Tyler-Justin Sharpe; Tomislav Ratešić
- Producer: Dystinkt Beats

Lil Tecca singles chronology
"Count Me Out" (2018)	"Love Me" (2018)	"Ransom" (2019)

"Love Me" is the debut single by American rapper Lil Tecca. The track was originally released as a single on October 29, 2018, before being re-released as a single on July 15, 2019, to act as a pre-release single for his debut mixtape We Love You Tecca.

== Music video ==
The music video for the track was released on November 18, 2018, on Lil Tecca's official YouTube channel. It has racked up over 22 million views as of January 2020. The video was directed by David Del Rosario.

== Critical reception ==
Alphonse Pierre of Pitchfork called the track "impressive" and a "refreshing genre-fusing track", saying that Tecca "quickly separated himself from being labeled an A Boogie clone". Daniel Spielberger of HipHopDX gave the song a more mixed review, saying that although the track was a "pleasant dancehall vibe", and that Tecca "did a good job rapping along with the groove", he said the track had some "questionable production choices", and that "the heavy Auto-Tune and bizarre helium effects didn’t bode well with the more organic, breezy beat".

== Commercial performance ==
Following the debut of Lil Tecca's mixtape We Love You Tecca debuting at number four on the Billboard 200, the song debuted at number 97 the week ending September 13, 2019.

== Charts ==
=== Weekly charts ===
Chart (2018–2019)	Peak position
Canada (Canadian Hot 100)	72
Ireland (IRMA)	73
Portugal (AFP)	30
Sweden Heatseeker (Sverigetopplistan)	9
UK Singles (Official Charts Company)	66
US Billboard Hot 100	97
US Hot R&B/Hip-Hop Songs (Billboard)	41
US Rolling Stone Top 100	65

=== Year-end charts ===
Chart (2019)	Position
Portugal (AFP)	150

== Certifications ==
Region	Certification	Certified units/sales
Australia (ARIA)	Gold	35,000^{‡}
Brazil (Pro-Música Brasil)	Platinum	40,000^{‡}
Canada (Music Canada)	Gold	40,000^{‡}
Denmark (IFPI Danmark)	Gold	45,000^{‡}
New Zealand (RMNZ)	Platinum	30,000^{‡}
Portugal (AFP)	Platinum	10,000^{‡}
Spain (PROMUSICAE)	Gold	30,000^{‡}
United Kingdom (BPI)	Gold	400,000^{‡}
United States (RIAA)	2× Platinum	2,000,000^{‡}
^{‡} Sales+streaming figures based on certification alone.
