= Boys Don't Cry (Lil Tecca song) =

Song by Lil Tecca

from the album Dopamine
- Released: June 13, 2025
- Genre: Hip-hop; Rage; Emo rap
- Length: 2:31
- Label: Galactic; Republic
- Songwriters: Tyler-Justin Anthony Sharpe; Cassidy Reese; Luis Ramirez
- Producers: Kassgocrazy; Evo

Audio video
- "Boys Don't Cry" on YouTube

"Boys Don't Cry" is a song by American rapper Lil Tecca, released as the ninth track from his fifth studio album, Dopamine (2025). The song, a Hip-hop, rage, and Emo rap composition, was written by Tecca himself, alongside the song's producer Kassgocrazy who later dropped a 39 song album with Tecca named WE LOVE YOU KASS. It was later released on the 13th of June, 2025, alongside the rest of Dopamine, through Republic Records and Tecca's own Galactic Records. Upon its release, it peaked at number 30 on the US Billboard Hot R&B/Hip-Hop Songs chart.

== Charts ==
Chart performance for "Boys Don't Cry"
Chart (2025)	Peak position
US Hot R&B/Hip-Hop Songs (Billboard)	30
