= Half the Plot =

2025 song by Lil Tecca

Song by Lil Tecca

from the album Dopamine
- Released: June 13, 2025
- Length: 2:45
- Label: Galactic; Republic
- Songwriters: Tyler-Justin Sharpe; Rio Leyva; Danny Snodgrass Jr.; Kaigorodov Andreevich
- Producers: Rio Leyva; Taz Taylor; Lawzy; Namelesss

Music video
- "Half the Plot" on YouTube

"Half the Plot" is a song by American rapper Lil Tecca from his fifth studio album, Dopamine (2025). It was produced by Rio Leyva, Taz Taylor, Lawzy and Namelesss.

== Content ==
The song finds Lil Tecca in a nonchalant attitude. In the lyrics, he focuses on the enjoyable moments of his life while acknowledging the drawbacks of fame and fortune but refusing to let them affect him.

== Critical reception ==
Zachary Horvath of HotNewHipHop gave a positive review, writing that "Lil Tecca may have just penned one of the best tracks for when you're in that feel-good mood this summer" and the chorus "really sets the tone perfectly for the impending verses". He additionally commented, "But outside of being a great stand-alone record, it also gets bonus points for having one of the smoothest transitions/outros. It's wavy and leads seamlessly into another smash in 'The Truth.'" Jesse James of stupidDOPE also gave a positive review, writing that ""Half The Plot" is proof that Lil Tecca knows how to make a song that resonates without forcing the issue", and that it "doesn't rely on dramatic shifts or shouty hooks—it floats on ease, honesty, and emotional control. As part of DOPAMINE, it reinforces the album's central theme: finding equilibrium in a life full of extremes."

== Music video ==
The song's music video was released on June 13, 2025.

== Charts ==
Chart performance for "Half the Plot"
Chart (2025)	Peak position
Canada Hot 100 (Billboard)	79
New Zealand Hot Singles (RMNZ)	7
US Billboard Hot 100	78
US Hot R&B/Hip-Hop Songs (Billboard)	20
