= Did It Again (Lil Tecca song) =

2019 single by Lil Tecca

Single by Lil Tecca

from the album We Love You Tecca
- Released: July 24, 2019
- Recorded: January 21, 2019
- Length: 1:56
- Label: Galactic; Republic
- Songwriters: Tyler-Justin Sharpe; Elias Latrou; Danny Snodgrass, Jr.; Nicholas Mira
- Producers: Nick Mira; Taz Taylor; E-Trou

Lil Tecca singles chronology
| "Bossanova" (2019) | "Did It Again" (2019) | "Ransom (Remix)" (2019) |

Music video
- "Did It Again" on YouTube

"Did It Again" is a song by American rapper Lil Tecca. It was released on July 24, 2019, as the seventh single from his debut mixtape We Love You Tecca. The song debuted at number 100 and peaked at 64 on the Billboard Hot 100, making it his second entry after "Ransom" peaked at number 4.

== Background ==
The song was originally released as a single on January 21, 2019, before being re-released on July 24, 2019.

== Chart performance ==
Did It Again debuted at number 100 on the Billboard Hot 100, and eventually reached its peak at number 64. On October 23, 2023, the single was certified two-timesplatinum by the Recording Industry Association of America (RIAA) for combined sales and streaming equivalent units of over a two million units in the United States.

== Music video ==
The music video debuted on WorldStarHipHop on March 2, 2019. It has over 78 million views as of January 2022.

== Charts ==
| Chart (2019) | Peak position |
|---|---|
| Canada (Canadian Hot 100) | 34 |
| Greece International (IFPI) | 63 |
| Ireland (IRMA) | 89 |
| UK Singles (OCC) | 84 |
| US Billboard Hot 100 | 64 |
| US Hot R&B/Hip-Hop Songs (Billboard) | 24 |
| US Rhythmic Airplay (Billboard) | 29 |
| US Rolling Stone Top 100 | 26 |

== Certifications ==
| Region | Certification | Certified units/sales |
|---|---|---|
| Brazil (Pro-Música Brasil) | Gold | 20,000^{‡} |
| Canada (Music Canada) | Gold | 40,000^{‡} |
| New Zealand (RMNZ) | Gold | 15,000^{‡} |
| Portugal (AFP) | Gold | 5,000^{‡} |
| United Kingdom (BPI) | Silver | 200,000^{‡} |
| United States (RIAA) | 2× Platinum | 2,000,000^{‡} |
^{‡} Sales+streaming figures based on certification alone.
