= 500lbs =

2023 single by Lil Tecca

Single by Lil Tecca

from the album Tec
- Released: July 21, 2023
- Genre: Trap
- Length: 2:24
- Label: Galactic; Republic
- Songwriters: Tyler-Justin Sharpe; Danny Snodgrass Jr.; Rio Leyva; 4OUR
- Producers: Taz Taylor; Rio Leyva; 4OUR

Lil Tecca singles chronology
"Need Me" (2023)	"500lbs" (2023)	"Hvn on Earth" (2023)

Music video
- "500lbs" on YouTube

"500lbs" is a song by American rapper Lil Tecca, released on July 21, 2023 as the second single from his third studio album Tec through Galactic Records and Republic Records. It was produced by Taz Taylor, Rio Leyva and 4OUR.

== Background ==
The song was teased for some time prior to its release, having first been previewed in June 2023 through an Instagram Live session.

== Commercial performance ==
Upon the release of Tec, the song entered the Billboard Hot 100 at number 60, eventually peaking at number 51.

== Charts ==
=== Weekly charts ===
Weekly chart performance for "500lbs"
Chart (2023–2024)	Peak position
Canada Hot 100 (Billboard)	34
Global 200 (Billboard)	139
New Zealand Hot Singles (RMNZ)	17
US Billboard Hot 100	51
US Hot R&B/Hip-Hop Songs (Billboard)	14
US Rhythmic Airplay (Billboard)	18

=== Year-end charts ===
2024 year-end chart performance for "500lbs"
Chart (2024)	Position
US Hot R&B/Hip-Hop Songs (Billboard)	47

== Certifications ==
Certifications for "500lbs"
Region	Certification	Certified units/sales
Canada (Music Canada)	Platinum	80,000^{‡}
New Zealand (RMNZ)	Platinum	30,000^{‡}
Poland (ZPAV)	Gold	25,000^{‡}
United States (RIAA)	2× Platinum	2,000,000^{‡}
^{‡} Sales+streaming figures based on certification alone.
