= Hvn on Earth =

2023 single by Lil Tecca and Kodak Black

Single by Lil Tecca and Kodak Black

from the album Tec
- Released: August 18, 2023
- Length: 3:08
- Label: Galactic; Republic
- Songwriters: Tyler-Justin Sharpe; Bill Kapri; Benjamin Saint Fort
- Producer: Bnyx

Lil Tecca singles chronology
"500lbs" (2023)	"Hvn on Earth" (2023)	"Dead or Alive" (2023)

Kodak Black singles chronology
"Shaka Laka" (2023)	"Hvn on Earth" (2023)	"Hope You Know" (2023)

"Hvn on Earth" (pronounced "heaven on Earth") is a song by American rappers Lil Tecca and Kodak Black, released on August 18, 2023 as the third single from the former's third studio album Tec (2023). It was produced by Bnyx.

== Composition ==
The song features a melodic performance and uptempo beat, with lyrics focusing on the artists' significant others.

== Critical reception ==
Alexander Cole of HotNewHipHop gave a positive review of the song, commenting it has "incredible" production and "As for Tecca, he [sounds] as focused as ever with melodic flows and a commanding presence. Kodak Black delivers a solid guest verse as well, which brings the whole track together."

== Charts ==
Chart performance for "Hvn on Earth"
Chart (2023)	Peak position
Canada Hot 100 (Billboard)	69
New Zealand Hot Singles (RMNZ)	17
US Billboard Hot 100	88
US Hot R&B/Hip-Hop Songs (Billboard)	30
