= Tec (album) =

Studio album by Lil Tecca
- Released: September 22, 2023
- Genre: Trap
- Length: 38:00
- Label: Galactic; Republic
- Producer: 206Derek; 4our; AM; Biinx; Bnyx; Clif Shayne; Dilip; Dreamz; DT; Dynox; Dystinkt Beats; Eli.yf; Falcons; Gray Toomey; KC Supreme; Lil Tecca; Maine; Matty Spats; Mike Hector; Nash Beats; Nick Mira; Ninetyniiine; Noah Mejia; Otxhello; Riggy; Rio Leyva; Ronio; Scizzie; Spaceman; Taz Taylor; ThankYouWill

Lil Tecca chronology
We Love You Tecca 2 (2021)	Tec (2023)	Plan A (2024)

Singles from Tec
- 1. "Need Me" Released: May 11, 2023; 2. "500lbs" Released: July 21, 2023; 3. "Hvn on Earth" Released: August 18, 2023; 4. "Dead or Alive" Released: September 20, 2023; 5. "Down with Me" Released: January 4, 2024

Tec (stylized in all caps) is the third studio album by American rapper Lil Tecca. It was released through Galactic and Republic Records on September 22, 2023. The album contains guest appearances from Kodak Black and Ken Carson. It serves as the follow-up to his previous album, We Love You Tecca 2 (2021).

== Release and promotion ==
On May 3, 2023, Lil Tecca shared the title of the album and announced that it would be released in the summer before later pushing it back to the fall. He shared its cover art and release date on September 7 and shared its tracklist five days later.

== Singles ==
The lead single of the album, "Need Me", was released on May 11, 2023. The second single, "500lbs", was released on July 21. The third single, "Hvn on Earth", a collaboration with fellow American rapper Kodak Black, was released on August 18. The fourth single, "Dead or Alive", was released on September 20, two days before the album was released. On January 4, 2024, the fifth and final single, "Down with Me", was released as a bonus track.

== Commercial performance ==
Tec debuted at number eleven on the US Billboard 200 with 41,000 units in its first week.

== Track listing ==
Tec track listing
No.	Title	Writer(s)	Producer(s)	Length
1.	"Yves"	Tyler-Justin Sharpe; Benjamin Saint-Fort; Ryan Rigaud	Bnyx; Riggy	2:17
2.	"Hvn on Earth" (with Kodak Black)	Sharpe; Bill Kapri; Saint-Fort	Lil Tecca; Bnyx	3:08
3.	"Gist"	Sharpe; Danny Snodgrass Jr.; Rio Leyva; William Lambert; Nathan Lamarche	Taz Taylor; Leyva; ThankYouWill; Nash Beats	2:10
4.	"500lbs"	Sharpe; Snodgrass; Leyva; John Darden IV	Taz Taylor; Leyva; 4our	2:24
5.	"Fell in Love" (with Ken Carson)	Sharpe; Kenyatta Frazier Jr.; Clif Shayne; Arman Andican	Shayne; AM	2:53
6.	"TEC"	Sharpe; Snodgrass; Kim Candilora II; Eli Kahler; Beck Unruh	Taz Taylor; KC Supreme; Eli.yf; Dreamz	2:11
7.	"Salty"	Sharpe; Snodgrass; Nicholas Mira; Brody Fallon; Leyva; Jake Mercier	Taz Taylor; Nick Mira; Dynox; Scizzie; Leyva	2:15
8.	"Real Discussions"	Sharpe; Snodgrass; Leyva; Derek Anderson; Matthew Spatola; Jermaine Bell	Taz Taylor; Leyva; 206Derek; Matty Spats; Maine	1:58
9.	"Dead or Alive"	Sharpe; Snodgrass; Leyva; Darden	Taz Taylor; Leyva; 4our	2:02
10.	"Want It Bad"	Sharpe; Tomislav Ratešić	Dystinkt Beats	2:10
11.	"U Don't Know Tec"	Sharpe; Snodgrass; Leyva; Lambert; Lamarche	Leyva; Taz Taylor; ThankYouWill; Nash Beats	1:50
12.	"Used2This"	Sharpe; Snodgrass; Leyva; Dorien Theus	Taz Taylor; DT; Biinx	2:25
13.	"Trippin on U"	Sharpe; Snodgrass; Mira; Leyva	Taz Taylor; Mira; Leyva	2:00
14.	"Either Way"	Sharpe; Mike Hector; Gray Toomey; Nathan Chen; Michael Oatman	Hector; Toomey; Ninetyniiine; Falcons	3:10
15.	"Need Me"	Sharpe; Brandy Norwood; Rodney Jerkins; Fred Jerkins III; LaShawn Daniels; Japhe Tejeda; Luri Dias	Ronio	2:20
16.	"Monday to Sunday"	Sharpe; Snodgrass; Dilip Venkatesh; Othello Houston; Campbell Rolston-Clemmer; Noah Mejia	Taz Taylor; Dilip; Otxhello; Spaceman; Mejia	2:50
Total length:				38:00

Bonus edition track listing
No.	Title	Writer(s)	Producer(s)	Length
17.	"Down with Me"	Sharpe; Saul Lopez	jk8	2:00
Total length:				40:00

== Personnel ==
=== Vocals ===
- Lil Tecca – lead vocals
- Kodak Black – vocals (2)
- Ken Carson – vocals (5)
- Bnyx – additional vocals (2) (Note: Although he is not officially credited, Bnyx confirmed on Twitter that he contributed vocals for "Hvn on Earth".)

=== Technical ===
- Lil Tecca – engineering (tracks 1, 2, 9, 14–16)
- Tom Norris – mixing (all tracks), mastering (all tracks)
- Patrick "MixedByTheBeast" Rosario – mixing (15), engineering (10)
- Edgard "Young Era" Herrera – engineering (3, 4, 7, 8, 11–13)
- Derek "Dyryk" Garcia – engineering (2)
- DJ Moon – engineering (5)
- Ben Lidsky – engineering (6)
- Victor "Prod" Agbugba – engineering (14, 16)
- Michael Deano – engineering assistance (6)

== Charts ==
=== Weekly charts ===
Weekly chart performance for each Tec
Chart (2023)	Peak position
Australian Hip Hop/R&B Albums (ARIA)	22
Austrian Albums (Ö3 Austria)	45
Belgian Albums (Ultratop Flanders)	68
Belgian Albums (Ultratop Wallonia)	160
Canadian Albums (Billboard)	13
Dutch Albums (Album Top 100)	69
French Albums (SNEP)	106
German Albums (Offizielle Top 100)	64
Irish Albums (IRMA)	84
Lithuanian Albums (AGATA)	35
New Zealand Albums (RMNZ)	19
Polish Albums (ZPAV)	95
Swiss Albums (Schweizer Hitparade)	20
UK Albums (OCC)	51
US Billboard 200	11
US Top R&B/Hip-Hop Albums (Billboard)	5

=== Year-end charts ===
Year-end chart performance for Tec
Chart (2023)	Position
US Top R&B/Hip-Hop Albums (Billboard)	91
Chart (2024)	Position
US Top R&B/Hip-Hop Albums (Billboard)	73
