= We Love You Tecca =

Mixtape by Lil Tecca
- Released: August 30, 2019
- Genre: Hip hop
- Length: 42:54
- Labels: Galactic; Republic
- Producers: CashMoneyAP; Chapo; Danny Wolf; Dez Wright; Dystinkt Beats; E-Trou; HNX Beats; Jo L'Z; King LeeBoy; Manso Beats; Menoh Beats; Nick Mira; Pvlace; Pi'erre Bourne; Stoopid Lou; Taz Taylor; YoungKio

Lil Tecca chronology
Tecca & Friends (2018)	We Love You Tecca (2019)	Virgo World (2020)

Singles from We Love You Tecca
- 1. "Count Me Out" Released: September 23, 2018; 2. "Love Me" Released: October 29, 2018; 3. "Ransom" Released: May 22, 2019; 4. "Molly Girl" Released: July 15, 2019; 5. "Bossanova" Released: July 18, 2019; 6. "Did It Again" Released: July 24, 2019; 7. "Ransom (Remix)" Released: August 15, 2019; 8. "Glo Up" Released: September 27, 2019

We Love You Tecca is the debut commercial mixtape by American rapper Lil Tecca. It was released on August 30, 2019, through Republic Records. The mixtape contains a sole guest appearance from Juice Wrld. It features Tecca's breakout hit, "Ransom", which peaked at number 4 on the Billboard Hot 100 chart, and the remix is with the guest.

The mixtape debuted at number four on the US Billboard 200 chart, earning 68,000 album-equivalent units in its first week. The mixtape was certified platinum by the Recording Industry Association of America (RIAA). The album's sequel, We Love You Tecca 2, was released on August 27, 2021.

== Background ==
Lil Tecca announced the mixtape and its cover artwork via his Instagram account on August 24, 2019. On August 28, Tecca confirmed the release date of the mixtape to be August 30 on his Instagram story.

== Promotion ==
=== Music videos ===
A music video was released for "Out of Luck" on August 30, 2019. It shows snippets from the music video for his hit single, "Ransom". A video for "Bossanova" was released on January 9, 2020. Music videos for "Count Me Out", "Ransom", "Love Me", and "Did It Again" were released before the album.

== Singles ==
"Count Me Out" was released as the mixtape's first single independently on September 23, 2018. "Ransom" was released as the second single on May 22, 2019, peaking at number 4 on the Billboard Hot 100. "Molly Girl", & "Love Me" were all re-released as singles on July 15, 2019, with the latter peaking at number 97 on the Billboard Hot 100 chart. "Bossanova" was released as the mixtape's fifth single on July 18, 2019. "Did It Again" was released as the mixtape's sixth single on July 24, 2019, peaking at number 64 on the Billboard Hot 100. The remix of "Ransom", featuring American rapper Juice Wrld, was released as the album's seventh single on August 15, 2019. "Glo Up" was released as the album's eighth single on September 27, 2019.

== Critical reception ==
Professional ratings
Review scores
Source	Rating
Exclaim!	2/10
HipHopDX	2.5/5 stars
Pitchfork	5.6/10

The mixtape received mixed reviews. Torsten Ingvaldsen of Hypebeast praised the mixtape, calling it "nothing short of an achievement for the young up-and-comer", and said that Tecca "showcases his talent for crafting a project that holistically pits him at its center."

Daniel Spielberger of HipHopDX, however, stated that the mixtape is a repetitive collection of "mostly muddled tracks that only occasionally show promise." An unnamed writer from Musicjo called the mixtape a "missed opportunity", writing, "instead of rapping about something deep, Tecca restricts himself and operates on a superficial level."

== Commercial performance ==
We Love You Tecca debuted at number four on the US Billboard 200, earning 68,000 album-equivalent units (including 4,048 in pure album sales) in its first week, surpassing its initial projections of 40,000 units. In its second week, the mixtape dropped to number five on the chart, earning an additional 49,000 units. On September 17, 2020, the album was certified platinum by the Recording Industry Association of America (RIAA) for combined sales and streaming equivalent units of over a million units in the United States.

== Track listing ==
Credits adapted from Tidal.

No.	Title	Writer(s)	Producer	Length
1.	"Ransom"	Tyler-Justin Sharpe; Danny Snodgrass, Jr.; Nicholas Mira	Taz Taylor; Nick Mira	2:11
2.	"Shots"	Sharpe; Snodgrass, Jr.; Mira	Mira; Taz Taylor	1:49
3.	"Sidenote"	Sharpe; Jordan Jenks	Pi'erre Bourne	2:38
4.	"Did It Again"	Sharpe; Mira; Snodgrass, Jr.; Elias Latrou	Mira; Taz Taylor; E-Trou	1:56
5.	"Out of Luck"	Sharpe; Amin Elamin	Menoh Beats	2:43
6.	"Left, Right"	Sharpe; Miguel Curtidor; Othello Houston	Danny Wolf; Otxhello	2:34
7.	"Bossanova"	Sharpe; Mira; Denis Berger; Michelangelo Pulvirenti	Mira; Pvlace; HNX Beats	2:03
8.	"Amigo"	Sharpe; Snodgrass, Jr.; Joel Abraham; Tomas Martinez	Taz Taylor; Jo L'Z; Manso Beats	2:35
9.	"Glo Up"	Sharpe; Harald Sorebo; Frederik Gamst	NextLaneBeats; Payday Beats	1:55
10.	"Phenom"	Sharpe; Mira; Dylan Cleary-Krell; Moritz Lepper	Mira; Dez Wright; Stoopid Lou	3:23
11.	"Weatherman"	Sharpe; Alex Petit	CashMoneyAP; King LeeBoy^{[a]}	2:53
12.	"DUI"	Sharpe; Milo Ben-Amotz	Rambow	2:15
13.	"Love Me"	Sharpe; Tomislav Ratešić	Dystinkt Beats	1:57
14.	"Molly Girl"	Sharpe; Elamin	Menoh Beats	1:57
15.	"The Score"	Sharpe; Snodgrass, Jr.; Cleary-Krell	Taz Taylor; Dez Wright	2:09
16.	"Senorita"	Sharpe; Petit; Kiowa Roukema	YoungKio; CashMoneyAP; Chapo^{[a]}	2:15
17.	"Count Me Out"	Sharpe; Ratešić	Dystinkt Beats	2:54
18.	"Ransom (Remix)" (with Juice Wrld)	Sharpe; Jarad Higgins; Snodgrass, Jr.; Mira	Mira; Taz Taylor	2:51
Total length:				42:54

Notes

- ^{^[a]} signifies an uncredited additional producer.

== Charts ==
=== Weekly charts ===
Chart (2019)	Peak position
Australian Albums (ARIA)	13
Belgian Albums (Ultratop Flanders)	17
Belgian Albums (Ultratop Wallonia)	85
Canadian Albums (Billboard)	3
Danish Albums (Hitlisten)	10
Dutch Albums (Album Top 100)	13
Finnish Albums (Suomen virallinen lista)	11
French Albums (SNEP)	74
Irish Albums (IRMA)	9
Italian Albums (FIMI)	68
Latvian Albums (LAIPA)	5
Lithuanian Albums (AGATA)	5
New Zealand Albums (RMNZ)	14
Norwegian Albums (VG-lista)	3
Swedish Albums (Sverigetopplistan)	20
UK Albums (Official Charts)	15
US Billboard 200	4
US Top R&B/Hip-Hop Albums (Billboard)	1

=== Year-end charts ===
Chart (2019)	Position
Dutch Albums (Album Top 100)	91
US Billboard 200	124
US Top R&B/Hip-Hop Albums (Billboard)	49
Chart (2020)	Position
US Billboard 200	123
US Top R&B/Hip-Hop Albums (Billboard)	63

== Certifications ==
Certifications for We Love You Tecca
Region	Certification	Certified units/sales
Denmark (IFPI Danmark)	Platinum	20,000^{‡}
Italy (FIMI)	Gold	25,000^{‡}
New Zealand (RMNZ)	Platinum	15,000^{‡}
Poland (ZPAV)	Gold	10,000^{‡}
United Kingdom (BPI)	Gold	100,000^{‡}
United States (RIAA)	Platinum	1,000,000^{‡}
^{‡} Sales+streaming figures based on certification alone.
