= Plan A (Lil Tecca album) =

PLAN A

Studio album by Lil Tecca
- Released: September 20, 2024
- Genre: Hip-hop
- Length: 44:28
- Label: Galactic; Republic
- Producer: 1keep; 206Derek; Berlo; Bhristo; BryceUnknwn; Bugz Ronin; Census; Chef9thegod; Dammittony; Deyflo; Dyce; IzzyNG; Jay Trench; Kassgocrazy; KC Supreme; LMG; Money Jezus; Nash Beats; Noah Mejia; Paryo; PAX; Rio Leyva; Scizzie; Spaceman; Taz Taylor; ThankYouWill; Tyto; Vendr; Venny; Vvspipes; y2tnb; Sharif Shannon

Lil Tecca chronology
Tec (2023)	PLAN A (2024)	Dopamine (2025)

Singles from Plan A
- 1. "Number 2" Released: May 3, 2024; 2. "Never Last" Released: May 3, 2024; 3. "Taste" Released: August 9, 2024; 4. "Bad Time" Released: August 20, 2024

PLAN A is the fourth studio album by American rapper Lil Tecca. It was released through Galactic and Republic Records on September 20, 2024. The album contains a sole guest appearance from Don Toliver. It serves as the follow-up to his previous album, Tec (2023).

== Singles ==
The lead two singles to the album "Number 2" and "Never Last" were released simultaneously on May 3, 2024, alongside a music video the same day. "Number 2" charted at 45 on the Hot R&B/Hip-Hop Songs charts and number 18 on the New Zealand Hot Singles chart. "Never Last" also charted on the New Zealand Hot Singles chart at number 29 respectively. The third single, "Taste" was released August 9, 2024, and charted at 31 on the New Zealand Hot Singles chart. The fourth and final single "Bad Time" was released August 20, 2024 and charted number 35 on the Hot R&B/Hip-Hop Songs chart and number 17 on the New Zealand Hot Singles chart.

== Commercial performance ==
In the United States, Plan A debuted at number nine on Billboard 200 chart, earning 42,000 album-equivalent units in its first week. This became Lil Tecca's fourth top ten album.

== Track listing ==
Plan A track listing
No.	Title	Writer(s)	Producer(s)	Length
1.	"Taste"	Tyler-Justin Sharpe; Robin Braun; Tony De Abreu; Rio Leyva; Liv Lykke; Danny Snodgrass Jr.; Ronni Vindahl; Garrison Webster	Taz Taylor; Rio Leyva; Vendr; Dammittony	2:50
2.	"Bad Time"	Sharpe; Gonçalo Brás; Noah Mejia; Michael Romito; Snodgrass	Taz Taylor; Chef9thegod; Mejia; Census	3:30
3.	"120"	Sharpe; Leyva; William Lambert; Romito; Snodgrass; Webster	Taz Taylor; Vendr; Cenus; Leyva; ThankYouWill	2:10
4.	"I Can't Let Go" (with Don Toliver)	Sharpe; Derek Anderson; Stan Greene; Kobe Hood; Daniel Perez; Christopher Quillin; Desmond Rasberry; Snodgrass; Caleb Toliver	Taz Taylor; Bugz Ronin; 206Derek; Bhristo; Money Jezus	2:30
5.	"Vogue"	Sharpe; Lucas Gadaleta; Snodgrass	Taz Taylor; LMG	2:33
6.	"24Hrs"	Sharpe; Jahmare Williams-Wright	Jay Trench	2:22
7.	"Number 2"	Sharpe; Leyva; Jake Mercier; Snodgrass	Taz Taylor; Scizzie; Leyva	2:17
8.	"Never Last"	Sharpe; Steven Giron; Leyva; Konstantin Pepelov; Snodgrass	Taz Taylor; Leyva; Venny; 1keep	2:21
9.	"Homebody"	Sharpe; Mejia; Michael Pieper; Snodgrass	Taz Taylor; Mejia; Vvspipes	1:59
10.	"Self2Self"	Sharpe; Cassidy Reese	Kassgocrazy	1:49
11.	"Separate Ways"	Sharpe; Campbell Rolston-Clemmer; Snodgrass; Parker Young	Taz Taylor; Spaceman; Paryo	2:10
12.	"Time & a Place"	Sharpe; Gadaleta; Leyva; Romito; Snodgrass	Taz Taylor; Leyva; Census; LMG	2:31
13.	"4U"	Sharpe; Kim Candilora II; Leyva; Mejia; Romito; Snodgrass; Webster	Taz Taylor; Leyva; Census; KC Supreme; Vendr; Mejia	2:22
14.	"Flowers"	Sharpe; Leo Berliant; Travis Barker; Bryce Frizzell; Ryan Le Roy-Dyson	Taz Taylor; BryceUnknwn; Dyce; Y2tnb; Berlo	2:39
15.	"Cold Girls"	Sharpe; Leyva; Mejia; Snodgrass; Webster	Taz Taylor; Mejia; Leyva; Vendr	2:43
16.	"Mama"	Sharpe; Leyva; Israel Nolan-Garnett; Romito; Snodgrass; Hannes Tomminen	Taz Taylor; Leyva; Census; IzzyNG; Pax	2:33
17.	"D1"	Sharpe; Cameron Choi; Romito; Spencer Ruskowski; Snodgrass	Taz Taylor; Census; Tyto; Deyflo	2:16
18.	"All the Time"	Sharpe; Nathan Lamarche; Leyva; Snodgrass	Taz Taylor; Nash Beats; Leyva	2:42
Total length:				44:28

Deluxe editions These were available exclusively through Tecca's website for a limited time.

🅰️ Edition additional track listing
No.	Title	Length
19.	"Right Now Radio"
20.	"Risk My Life"

AAA Edition additional track listing
No.	Title	Length
19.	"Over You"
20.	"Montana"

== Personnel ==
- Lil Tecca – vocals (all tracks), engineering (tracks 1, 2, 4–6, 9–17)
- Tom Norris – mastering, mixing
- Edgard Herrera – mixing (track 4), engineering (3, 4, 7, 8)
- Victor "Prod" Agbugba – engineering (tracks 1, 14)
- Derek "206" Anderson – engineering (track 4)
- Patrick "MixedByTheBest" Rosario – engineering (track 18)
- Taz Taylor – programming (tracks 1, 2, 7, 8)
- Rio Leyva – programming (tracks 1, 7, 8)
- Nick Mira – programming (track 1)
- Census – programming (track 2)
- Chef9thegod – programming (track 2)
- Noah Mejia – programming (track 2)
- Scizzie – programming (track 7)
- 1keep – programming (track 8)
- Venny – programming (track 8)
- Rhegan Coursey – additional vocals (track 7)

== Charts ==
=== Weekly charts ===
Weekly chart performance for Plan A
Chart (2024)	Peak position
Australian Hip Hop/R&B Albums (ARIA)	23
Austrian Albums (Ö3 Austria)	58
Belgian Albums (Ultratop Flanders)	86
Canadian Albums (Billboard)	20
Dutch Albums (Album Top 100)	53
Hungarian Albums (MAHASZ)	34
Irish Albums (IRMA)	83
Lithuanian Albums (AGATA)	21
New Zealand Albums (RMNZ)	31
Polish Albums (ZPAV)	83
Portuguese Albums (AFP)	27
Swiss Albums (Schweizer Hitparade)	20
UK Albums (OCC)	66
US Billboard 200	9
US Top R&B/Hip-Hop Albums (Billboard)	2

=== Year-end charts ===
Year-end chart performance for Plan A
Chart (2024)	Position
US Top R&B/Hip-Hop Albums (Billboard)	90
