= Dead or Alive (Lil Tecca song) =

2023 single by Lil Tecca

Single by Lil Tecca

from the album Tec
- Released: September 20, 2023
- Length: 2:02
- Label: Galactic; Republic
- Songwriters: Tyler-Justin Sharpe; Danny Snodgrass Jr.; Rio Leyva; John Darden IV
- Producers: Taz Taylor; Leyva; 4our

Lil Tecca singles chronology
"Hvn on Earth" (2023)	"Dead or Alive" (2023)	"Head Doctor (Remix)" (2023)

Music video
- "Dead or Alive" on YouTube

"Dead or Alive" is a song by American rapper Lil Tecca, released on September 20, 2023, as the fourth single from his third studio album Tec, which was released two days later. It was produced by Taz Taylor, Rio Leyva and John Darden IV.

== Background ==
In an interview with Apple Music, Lil Tecca explained the meaning behind the song:

It's very just in your face, like, the way I always see people's opinions and anyone besides us, you know? Because we're all in our individual worlds. So I'm like, anything that anyone can say to me, in a hundred years, they're gonna be gone the same way I'm gonna be gone. So, regardless if I'm dead or alive, I'ma do this the way I wanna do it. It's a statement of mortality, for real. Like that's all it comes down to, no matter how much money you make or how accomplished you are, it's gonna come to an end. So you don't wanna sit at the end and be like, "Man, I wish I did it this way, I wish I didn't think about what people were talking about, I wish that, I wish this."

== Critical reception ==
Alexander Cole gave a positive review, writing, "The song is yet another banger from Tecca, with some melodic production and the vocals to match. It aligns with what we have heard from Tecca this album cycle, albeit with a twist."

== Charts ==
Chart performance for "Dead or Alive"
Chart (2023)	Peak position
Canada Hot 100 (Billboard)	80
New Zealand Hot Singles (RMNZ)	24
US Bubbling Under Hot 100 (Billboard)	4
US Hot R&B/Hip-Hop Songs (Billboard)	38
