= Dopamine (Lil Tecca album) =

Studio album by Lil Tecca
- Released: June 13, 2025
- Recorded: October 2024–2025
- Studio: Tecca's apartment (New York City)
- Length: 41:41
- Labels: Galactic; Republic
- Producers: Lil Tecca; 1nother; Burny; Cartier K; Census; Clams Casino; Elijah Dallas; EQProd; Evo; Faizo; Folie's; Georgie; Ginseng; Godoftrip; Icami; JErez; Kassgocrazy; Lawzy; Rio Leyva; Mlodyhubson; Mo6; Namelesss; Nautilux; Perto; Sabb3y_; Lucas Scharff; Tai Scordo; Supera; Sharif Shannon; Taz Taylor; Thankyouwill; WhoisRodney

Lil Tecca chronology
Plan A (2024)	Dopamine (2025)

Dopamine: The Rush cover

Singles from Dopamine
- 1. "Dark Thoughts" Released: March 14, 2025; 2. "Owa Owa" Released: May 30, 2025

Dopamine is the fifth studio album by the American rapper and singer Lil Tecca. It was released on June 13, 2025, through Galactic and Republic Records. The album contains 17 tracks including a sole guest appearance from Ken Carson. It serves as the follow up to his previous album, Plan A (2024). The album was preceded by the release of the singles "Dark Thoughts" and "Owa Owa", with "Half the Plot" receiving a music video upon its release.

== Release and promotion ==
The lead single from the album, "Dark Thoughts", was released on March 14, 2025. "Dark Thoughts" charted number 28 on the Billboard Hot 100, 9 on the Hot R&B/Hip-Hop Songs Chart, 22 on the ARIA Charts, 22 on the Canadian Hot 100, 34 on the Irish Singles Chart, 11 on the Official Aotearoa Music Charts, 7 on the NZ Hot Chart and number 20 on the UK singles chart. "Dark Thoughts" was certified Gold by the RIAA on May 9, 2025.

The second single from the album, "Owa Owa", was released on May 30. "Owa Owa" charted number 50 on the Billboard Hot 100, 11 on the Hot Hot R&B/Hip-Hop Songs Chart, 46 on the Canadian Hot 100, 86 on the Irish Singles Chart, 4 on the NZ Hot Chart and number 76 on the UK singles chart.

Lil Tecca announced North American "The Dopamine Experience" tour in support of the album in July 2025. The tour ran from September 24, 2025, to November 7, 2025.

== Critical reception ==
AllMusic rated the album 3/5, praising its instrumentation but criticizing "Lil Tecca's overuse of the same repetitive, Auto-Tuned flows." Antonio Johri of Complex stated that the album "showcases his malleability."

=== Accolades ===
Publication	Accolade	Rank	Ref.
Complex	The 50 Best Albums of 2025	45	
HotNewHipHop	The 40 Best Rap Albums Of 2025	36	

== Commercial performance ==
Dopamine debuted at number three on the US Billboard 200 with 48,000 units in its first week. It was his highest charting album at time of release.

== Track listing ==
Dopamine track listing
No.	Title	Writer(s)	Producer(s)	Length
1.	"Dark Thoughts"	Tyler-Justin Sharpe; Lucas Scharff	Scharff; Folie's	2:16
2.	"Owa Owa"	Sharpe; Rio Leyva; Danny Snodgrass Jr.; Geoff Downes; Trevor Horn; Bruce Woolley	Lil Tecca; Leyva; Taz Taylor	2:12
3.	"Half the Plot"	Sharpe; Leyva; Snodgrass; Kaigorodov Andreevich	Leyva; Taylor; Lawzy; Namelesss	2:45
4.	"The Truth"	Sharpe; Snodgrass; George Harrison	Taylor; Georgie	2:24
5.	"Favorite Lie"	Sharpe; Wade Holmes	Nautilux	2:49
6.	"Hollywood"	Sharpe; Elijah Dallas	Dallas	2:53
7.	"X Factor"	Sharpe; Snodgrass; Kristupas Milašauskas; Samuele Cirami; Jonah Erez	Taylor; Faizo; Icami; JErez	2:11
8.	"Don't Rush"	Sharpe; Leyva; Snodgrass; Harrison	Leyva; Taylor; Georgie	2:24
9.	"Boys Don't Cry"	Sharpe; Luis Ramirez; Cassidy Reese	Evo; Kassgocrazy	2:31
10.	"Sure of It"	Sharpe; Samuel Bradburn; Spencer Ruskowski; Michael Romito; Snodgrass	Taylor; Burny; Census; TYTO	2:12
11.	"LYK"	Sharpe; Leyva; Snodgrass; Harrison	Leyva; Taylor; Georgie	2:43
12.	"On Your Own"	Sharpe; Snodgrass; Bradburn; Evan Qin; Hubert Adamiak; Jakub Zimniak; Sebastian Halon; Vivaan Gugnani	Taylor; Burny; Cartier K; EQProd; Mo6; Sabb3y_; Mlodyhubson	2:14
13.	"One Night"	Sharpe; Michael Volpe; Christian Baello	Clams Casino; Ginseng	2:07
14.	"Irish Goodbye"	Sharpe; Leyva; Snodgrass; Tai Scordo; William Lambert; Rodney Perez	Leyva; Taylor; Scordo; Thankyouwill; WhoisRodney	2:18
15.	"Wake Up"	Sharpe; Leyva; Snodgrass; Andreevich; Roman Shatsky; Thomas Ou	Leyva; Taylor; Lawzy; 1nother; Godoftrip	2:11
16.	"Malibu's Most Wanted"	Sharpe; Snodgrass; Romito; Ryan Super	Taylor; Census; Supera	2:24
17.	"Tic Tac Toe" (with Ken Carson)	Sharpe; Kenyatta Frazier Jr.; Rupert Howarth	Perto	2:57
Total length:				41:41

Dopamine: The Rush digital deluxe edition additional tracks
No.	Title	Length
18.	"Catch Me If You Can"
19.	"Not Too Much"
20.	"Sold Not Told"
21.	"L.A.N."

Notes

- "Owa Owa" contains a sample of "Video Killed the Radio Star", written by Geoff Downes, Trevor Horn and Bruce Woolley, as performed by the Buggles.

== Personnel ==
Adapted from Tidal. Programming is credited to each track's producer; technical credits below are for additional contributions.

- Lil Tecca – vocals
- Ken Carson – vocals (track 17)
- Aneta Gocmanac – additional vocals (tracks 2, 3)

=== Musicians ===
- Sabb3y_ – bass, drum, percussion, co-arranger (track 12)
- Perto – synthbass (track 17)

=== Technical ===
- Tom Norris – mixing, mastering
- Lil Tecca –recording engineer

== Charts ==
=== Weekly charts ===
Weekly chart performance for Dopamine
Chart (2025)	Peak position
Australian Albums (ARIA)	28
Australian Hip Hop/R&B Albums (ARIA)	5
Austrian Albums (Ö3 Austria)	16
Belgian Albums (Ultratop Flanders)	43
Belgian Albums (Ultratop Wallonia)	86
Canadian Albums (Billboard)	2
Dutch Albums (Album Top 100)	20
French Albums (SNEP)	64
German Albums (Offizielle Top 100)	55
Hungarian Albums (MAHASZ)	21
Icelandic Albums (Tónlistinn)	33
Irish Albums (Official Charts)	26
Lithuanian Albums (AGATA)	30
New Zealand Albums (RMNZ)	7
Norwegian Albums (IFPI Norge)	20
Polish Albums (ZPAV)	24
Portuguese Albums (AFP)	15
Swiss Albums (Schweizer Hitparade)	7
UK Albums (Official Charts)	17
UK R&B Albums (Official Charts)	22
US Billboard 200	3
US Top R&B/Hip-Hop Albums (Billboard)	1

=== Year-end charts ===
Year-end chart performance for Dopamine
Chart (2025)	Position
US Top R&B/Hip-Hop Albums (Billboard)	74
