= Show Me Up =

2021 single by Lil Tecca

Single by Lil Tecca

from the album We Love You Tecca 2
- Released: April 6, 2021
- Length: 2:46
- Label: Galactic; Republic
- Songwriters: Tyler-Justin Sharpe; Nathan Perez; Jalan Hunter
- Producer: Niko East

Lil Tecca singles chronology
"Jetski" (2021)	"Show Me Up" (2021)	"Never Left" (2021)

Music video
- "Show Me Up" on YouTube

"Show Me Up" is a song by American rapper Lil Tecca, released on April 6, 2021. Produced by Niko East, it appears on the deluxe version of his second studio album We Love You Tecca 2 (2021).

== Composition ==
The song contains a "dreamy and opulent" beat, over which Lil Tecca details a particular woman he is interested in.

== Charts ==
Chart performance for "Show Me Up"
Chart (2021)	Peak position
New Zealand Hot Singles (RMNZ)	22
US Bubbling Under Hot 100 (Billboard)	21
US Hot R&B/Hip-Hop Songs (Billboard)	50
