= Down with Me =

2024 single by Lil Tecca

Single by Lil Tecca

from the album Tec
- Released: January 4, 2024
- Recorded: 2023
- Length: 2:00
- Label: Galactic; Republic
- Songwriters: Tyler-Justin Sharpe; jk8
- Producer: jk8

Lil Tecca singles chronology
"Head Doctor (Remix)" (2023)	"Down with Me" (2024)

Music video
- "Down with Me" on YouTube

"Down with Me" is a song by American rapper Lil Tecca, released to streaming services on January 4, 2024. It is the fifth single and a bonus track from his third studio album, Tec (2023). The song was produced by jk8.

== Background ==
Lil Tecca had been teasing the song on Instagram for over a month, prior to its release.

== Composition and critical reception ==
Alexander Cole of HotNewHipHop wrote of the song, "Once again, this is a melodic offering with some truly phenomenal production. The melodic horns in the background are met with some crisp drums that go together perfectly. Meanwhile, Tecca slides over this production with some melodies of his own. It is yet another example of his great ear." Elaina Bernstein of Hypebeast commented the song "finds Tecca in his zone where he performs best, smoothly sliding over a pristinely produced beat."

== Music video ==
The music video premiered on December 29, 2023. It was directed by Lil Tecca and jordiedotcom and produced by Massimo Cancelliere.

== Charts ==
Chart performance for "Down with Me"
Chart (2024)	Peak position
Canada Hot 100 (Billboard)	59
New Zealand Hot Singles (RMNZ)	4
US Bubbling Under Hot 100 (Billboard)	4
US Hot R&B/Hip-Hop Songs (Billboard)	35
