= Dark Thoughts (Lil Tecca song) =

Single by Lil Tecca

from the album Dopamine
- Released: March 14, 2025
- Length: 2:16
- Label: Republic
- Songwriters: Tyler-Justin Sharpe; Lucas Scharff
- Producer: Lucas Scharff

Lil Tecca singles chronology
"Bad Time" (2024)	"Dark Thoughts" (2025)	"Owa Owa" (2025)

Audio video
- "Dark Thoughts" on YouTube

"Dark Thoughts" is a song by American rapper Lil Tecca. It was released on March 14, 2025, through Republic Records, as the lead single of his 5th studio album, Dopamine. The song was written by Tecca and was produced by the Danish producer Lucas Scharff.

== Composition ==
"Dark Thoughts" features an "upbeat and bouncy melody" in the style of Pharrell Williams's work with the Neptunes, drawing particular comparisons to "Frontin'" and "Beautiful". In the song, Tecca talks to his girlfriend and assures her that he will always lend her an ear.

== Critical reception ==
Michael Saponara at Billboard saw the song as an example of Tecca "getting in his pop bag" as he delivers a "soundtrack to a night out on the rooftop bars" and ups "his artistry to new heights" in the process. Devin Morton of HotNewHipHop elaborated that the song showcases Tecca's growth as an artist into a "more capable" songmaker and called "Dark Thoughts" a contender for "the best track of his career" even though it is not a new "stylistic choice". Morton thought the chorus was the climax of the song, calling his vocal delivery "infectious".

HotNewHipHop ranked the song as the 10th best rap song of 2025.

== Charts ==
=== Weekly charts ===
Weekly chart performance for "Dark Thoughts"
Chart (2025)	Peak position
Australia (ARIA)	22
Australia Hip Hop/R&B (ARIA)	4
Austria (Ö3 Austria Top 40)	58
Canada Hot 100 (Billboard)	22
Denmark (Tracklisten)	34
Germany (GfK)	99
Global 200 (Billboard)	34
Greece International (IFPI)	61
Iceland (Tónlistinn)	16
Ireland (IRMA)	34
Latvia Streaming (LaIPA)	11
Lithuania (AGATA)	28
Lithuania Airplay (TopHit)	40
Malta Airplay (Radiomonitor)	17
Netherlands (Single Top 100)	51
New Zealand (Recorded Music NZ)	11
Norway (VG-lista)	27
Sweden (Sverigetopplistan)	82
Switzerland (Schweizer Hitparade)	39
UK Singles (Official Charts)	20
UK Hip Hop/R&B (Official Charts)	3
US Billboard Hot 100	28
US Hot R&B/Hip-Hop Songs (Billboard)	9
US Pop Airplay (Billboard)	35
US Rhythmic Airplay (Billboard)	2

=== Monthly charts ===
Monthly chart performance for "Dark Thoughts"
Chart (2025)	Peak position
Lithuania Airplay (TopHit)	42

=== Year-end charts ===
Year-end chart performance for "Dark Thoughts"
Chart (2025)	Position
Canada (Canadian Hot 100)	71
US Billboard Hot 100	96
US Hot R&B/Hip-Hop Songs (Billboard)	21
US Rhythmic Airplay (Billboard)	15

== Certifications ==
Certifications for "Dark Thoughts"
Region	Certification	Certified units/sales
Brazil (Pro-Música Brasil)	Gold	20,000^{‡}
New Zealand (RMNZ)	Platinum	30,000^{‡}
United Kingdom (BPI)	Silver	200,000^{‡}
United States (RIAA)	Platinum	1,000,000^{‡}
^{‡} Sales+streaming figures based on certification alone.
