= Bad Time (Lil Tecca song) =

2024 single by Lil Tecca

Single by Lil Tecca

from the album Plan A
- Released: August 30, 2024
- Length: 3:30
- Label: Galactic; Republic
- Songwriters: Tyler-Justin Sharpe; Danny Snodgrass Jr.; Noah Mejia; Michael Romito; Gonçalo Brás
- Producers: Taz Taylor; Mejia; Census; Chef9thegod

Lil Tecca singles chronology
"Taste" (2024)	"Bad Time" (2024)	"Dark Thoughts" (2025)

Music video
- "Bad Time" on YouTube

"Bad Time" is a song by American rapper Lil Tecca, released on August 30, 2024, as the fourth single from his album Plan A.

== Background ==
Lil Tecca first previewed the song on June 24, 2024, via Instagram Live.

== Composition ==
"Bad Time" is a song of melodic rap/R&B style, in which Lil Tecca describes being in a cycle of poor romantic relationships.

== Charts ==
Chart performance for "Bad Time"
Chart (2024)	Peak position
New Zealand Hot Singles (RMNZ)	17
US Bubbling Under Hot 100 (Billboard)	10
US Hot R&B/Hip-Hop Songs (Billboard)	35
