= We Love You Tecca 2 =

Studio album by Lil Tecca
- Released: August 27, 2021
- Genre: Trap
- Length: 47:34
- Label: Galactic; Republic
- Producer: Aro; Bakkwoods; Bevolo; Bryce Unknwn; Census; Cxdy; DT; Dynox; E-Trou; Georgie; John Luther; Lil Tecca; Nash; Nick Mira; Nico Baran; Niketaz; Noir; Ovrcz; Paryo; Rio Leyva; Ryder Johnson; Spaceman; Taz Taylor; ThankYouWill; Y2TNB

Lil Tecca chronology
Virgo World (2020)	We Love You Tecca 2 (2021)	Tec (2023)

Singles from We Love You Tecca 2
- 1. "Show Me Up" Released: April 6, 2021; 2. "Never Left" Released: May 6, 2021; 3. "Money on Me" Released: July 23, 2021; 4. "Repeat It" Released: August 6, 2021

We Love You Tecca 2 is the second studio album by American rapper Lil Tecca. It was released through Galactic and Republic Records on August 27, 2021, one day after his 19th birthday. The album contains guest appearances from Gunna, Iann Dior, Chief Keef, Trippie Redd, Nav, and Lil Yachty. It serves as the sequel to his 2019 mixtape, We Love You Tecca, and the album was released three days before the second anniversary of the mixtape.

== Background ==
In an interview with GQ on his birthday in 2021, Lil Tecca compared We Love You Tecca 2 to his debut studio album, Virgo World (2020), which he released almost a year before. He stated: "I ain't gonna lie. This one feels way more like I have guidance, and just a direction. With Virgo World, everything just felt like the lights were off. Like I didn't know where to go. I felt like I had no sort of direction for myself. But, for this one? It definitely feels way better". The following day, he also told XXL about the creation of the album: "I'm not making no crazy country music or something, but I would say the process was different. Just the energy was different. It feels really natural. It feels really concentrated and focused. It's definitely a vision. We're not just lost in the sauce".

== Release and promotion ==
On July 22, 2021, Lil Tecca shared the cover art of the album and announced the release date of August 6, 2021. However, this did not happen as Tecca stated on August 2, through an Instagram story that the album was being pushed back due to a song not being able to be cleared for its sample and he would be adding two new tracks. However, on August 21, he shared an Instagram filter to reveal the tracklist. The following day, Taz Taylor announced its release date. Tecca shared the complete tracklist on August 24, 2021. A deluxe version of the album was released on September 1, 2021.

== Singles ==
Three singles preceded the release of the album. The lead single, "Never Left", was released on May 6, 2021. The second single, "Money on Me", was released on July 23. The third single, "Repeat It", a collaboration with fellow American rapper Gunna, was released on August 6, which was the original release date for the album. "Show Me Up", which was previously released on April 6, was later included on the album on the deluxe version.

== Critical reception ==
Professional ratings
Review scores
Source	Rating
AllMusic	3.5/5 stars

David Aaron Brake of HipHopDX felt that "[as] one of the acts which came in the trailing ends of the original SoundCloud era, Lil Tecca's We Love You Tecca 2 proves yet again that he's much more than a stereotype". Fred Thomas of AllMusic wrote that the album is "more consistent than previous Lil Tecca material, lacing together nicely with the help of snappy song structures and tight production."

== Commercial performance ==
We Love You Tecca 2 debuted at number ten on the US Billboard 200 with 30,000 sales in its first week (including 1,000 pure album sales) in its first week. In its second week, the album dropped to number sixteen on the chart. It is Lil Tecca's third US top-ten album.

== Track listing ==
We Love You Tecca 2 track listing
No.	Title	Writer(s)	Producer(s)	Length
1.	"Money on Me"	Tyler-Justin Sharpe; Danny Snodgrass, Jr.; Parker Young	Taz Taylor; Paryo	2:23
2.	"Repeat It" (with Gunna)	Sharpe; Sergio Kitchens; Snodgrass; Michael Romito; Nico Baran; Jocelyn Donald	Taz Taylor; Census; Baran	3:10
3.	"Never Left"	Sharpe; Snodgrass; Cody Rounds; William Lambert	Taz Taylor; Cxdy; ThankYouWill	2:48
4.	"Caution"	Sharpe; Snodgrass; Nicholas Mira	Taz Taylor; Nick Mira	2:05
5.	"Seaside" (featuring Iann Dior)	Sharpe; Michael Olmo; Snodgrass; Rounds; Elias Iatrou; Ryan Bevolo; Niccolo Short	Taz Taylor; Cxdy; E-Trou; Bevolo; Ovrcz	2:12
6.	"No Discussion"	Sharpe; Snodgrass; Mira; John Luther-John Carolus; Noah Skopek	Taz Taylor; Mira; John Luther; Noir	1:44
7.	"You Don't Need Me No More"	Sharpe; Snodgrass; Young	Taz Taylor; Paryo	2:37
8.	"Fee"	Sharpe; Snodgrass; Carolus; Rio Leyva	Taz Taylor; John Luther; Leyva	1:52
9.	"Choppa Shoot the Loudest" (with Chief Keef featuring Trippie Redd)	Sharpe; Keith Cozart; Michael White II; Snodgrass; Rounds; Ryder Johnson; Dorien Theus; Brody Fallon; Donald	Taz Taylor; Cxdy; Johnson; DT; Dynox	4:01
10.	"Did That"	Sharpe; Snodgrass; Baran; Leyva	Lil Tecca; Taz Taylor; Baran; Leyva	1:48
11.	"About You" (with Nav)	Sharpe; Navraj Goraya; Snodgrass; Mira	Taz Taylor; Mira	3:24
12.	"Lot of Me"	Sharpe; Snodgrass; Leyva; George Harrison; William Pugh	Taz Taylor; Leyva; Georgie; Bakkwoods	2:03
13.	"Investigation"	Sharpe; Snodgrass; Young; Romito; Campbell Rolston-Clemmer	Taz Taylor; Paryo; Census; Spaceman	1:41
14.	"You Gotta Do Better"	Sharpe; Snodgrass; Young	Taz Taylor; Paryo	1:42
15.	"Bank Teller" (with Lil Yachty)	Sharpe; Miles McCollum; Snodgrass; Rounds; Nathan Lamarche	Taz Taylor; Cxdy; Nash	2:58
16.	"Nada"	Sharpe; Snodgrass; Rounds; Leyva; Bryce Frizzell; Travis Barker	Taz Taylor; Cxdy; Leyva; Bryce Unknwn; Y2TNB	2:28
17.	"My Side"	Sharpe; Snodgrass; Young	Taz Taylor; Paryo	1:51
18.	"Whatever"	Sharpe; Snodgrass; Vince Aro	Taz Taylor; Aro	2:26
19.	"Shooters"	Sharpe; Snodgrass; Young	Taz Taylor; Paryo	2:05
20.	"Everywhere I Go"	Sharpe; Snodgrass; Romito; Rolston-Clemmer; Nicola Kollar	Taz Taylor; Census; Spaceman; Niketaz	2:05
Total length:				47:34

Deluxe edition track listing
No.	Title	Writer(s)	Producer(s)	Length
21.	"Hold On"	Sharpe; Snodgrass; Cooper Vengrove; y2tnb	Taz Taylor; Cooper Vengrove; y2tnb	2:43
22.	"Transynphony"	Sharpe; Cameron Jones Pitts	MexikoDro	2:44
23.	"Virgo"	Sharpe; Edgard Noel Herrera; Mira	Young Era; Nick Mira	1:56
24.	"Grammy (Freestyle)"	Sharpe; HolyOne	HolyOne	2:11
25.	"Show Me Up"	Sharpe; Nathan Perez; Jalan Hunter	Niko East	2:46
Total length:				59:54

== Personnel ==
Credits adapted from Tidal. Programming is credited to the producers of each track.

- Edgard Herrera – mixing (all tracks), studio personnel (all tracks)
- Mills Logan – immersive mixing (track 1)
- Jeff Fitzgerald – immersive mixing (tracks 2–20)

== Charts ==
=== Weekly charts ===
Chart performance for We Love You Tecca 2
Chart (2021)	Peak position
Australian Albums (ARIA)	49
Belgian Albums (Ultratop Flanders)	129
Canadian Albums (Billboard)	9
Dutch Albums (Album Top 100)	60
Irish Albums (IRMA)	98
Lithuanian Albums (AGATA)	74
New Zealand Albums (RMNZ)	28
Norwegian Albums (VG-lista)	25
UK Albums (OCC)	83
US Billboard 200	10
US Top R&B/Hip-Hop Albums (Billboard)	6

=== Year-end charts ===
Year-end chart performance for We Love You Tecca 2
Chart (2021)	Position
US Top R&B/Hip-Hop Albums (Billboard)	91
