= Never Left =

2021 single by Lil Tecca

Single by Lil Tecca

from the album We Love You Tecca 2
- Released: May 6, 2021
- Length: 2:49
- Label: Galactic; Republic
- Songwriters: Cody Rounds; Danny Lee Snodgrass, Jr.; Tyler-Justin Anthony Sharpe; William Slayton Lambert
- Producers: ThankYouWill; Taz Taylor; Cxdy

Lil Tecca singles chronology
"Show Me Up" (2021)	"Never Left" (2021)	"Money on Me" (2021)

Music video
- "Never Left" on YouTube

"Never Left" is a song by American rapper Lil Tecca, released on May 6, 2021, as the lead single from his second studio album We Love You Tecca 2 (2021). The track was produced by ThankYouWill, Taz Taylor, and Cxdy.

== Critical reception ==
Mitch Findlay of HotNewHipHop wrote that although the track was "not quite as immediately accessible as some of Tecca's previous work", he complimented Tecca's "melodic instincts" as "sharp".

== Charts ==
Chart performance for "Never Left"
Chart (2021)	Peak position
Canada Hot 100 (Billboard)	30
Global 200 (Billboard)	58
Ireland (IRMA)	42
Netherlands (Single Top 100)	100
New Zealand Hot Singles (RMNZ)	4
UK Singles (OCC)	50
US Billboard Hot 100	56
US Hot R&B/Hip-Hop Songs (Billboard)	24
US Hot Rap Songs (Billboard)	19
US Rhythmic Airplay (Billboard)	31
US Rolling Stone Top 100	28

== Certifications ==
Certifications for "Never Left"
Region	Certification	Certified units/sales
Canada (Music Canada)	Gold	40,000^{‡}
United States (RIAA)	Platinum	1,000,000^{‡}
^{‡} Sales+streaming figures based on certification alone.
