= Owa Owa =

2025 single by Lil Tecca

Single by Lil Tecca

from the album Dopamine
- Released: May 30, 2025
- Genre: Hip-hop; trap
- Length: 2:12
- Label: Galactic; Republic
- Songwriters: Tyler-Justin Sharpe; Rio Leyva; Danny Snodgrass Jr.; Geoff Downes; Trevor Horn; Bruce Woolley
- Producers: Leyva; Taz Taylor

Lil Tecca singles chronology
"Dark Thoughts" (2025)	"Owa Owa" (2025)

Music video
- "Owa Owa" on YouTube

"Owa Owa" is a song by American rapper Lil Tecca, released on May 30, 2025 as the second single from his fifth studio album, Dopamine. Produced by Rio Leyva and Taz Taylor, it contains a sample of "Video Killed the Radio Star" by the Buggles.

== Background ==
Lil Tecca previewed the song in a snippet on Instagram on April 22, 2025, prior to its release.

== Composition ==
"Owa Owa" is a melodic trap song. In the lyrics, Lil Tecca boasts his luxury items such as Chrome Hearts accessories and details flirting with a woman, particularly charming her with his lavish lifestyle. The production samples the "owa-owa" refrain from "Video Killed the Radio Star", which acts as her response to the activities of their relationship, such as sex and extravagance. Tecca also brags about having a "roster" of casual sex partners.

== Critical reception ==
The song received generally positive reviews. Billboard's Christopher Claxton called it a "hypnotic blend of flex-heavy bars and carefree energy, wrapped in a woozy, melodic beat." In regard to the sample, Armon Sadler of Vibe wrote that Lil Tecca "sticks the landing with flying colors". He additionally described the song as a "sensual, unashamed, fun effort with a lot of replay value due to its two-minute, 12-second run time." Stephen Andrew Galiher of Vice commented, "'Owa Owa' is a slow jam with a transformative beat that doesn't rely on its source material's nostalgia to carry it. This is one you're gonna want to add to all your summer playlists."

== Music video ==
The music video was released alongside the single. It sees Lil Tecca performing in front of a wall that is graffitied with the word "Dopamine". He also takes his lover to Round One and roams through a grassy field. It was directed by Gualo Dawes.

== Charts ==
=== Weekly charts ===
Weekly chart performance for "Owa Owa"
Chart (2025)	Peak position
Australia (ARIA)	99
Australia Hip Hop/R&B (ARIA)	11
Canada Hot 100 (Billboard)	46
Global 200 (Billboard)	83
Ireland (IRMA)	86
Malta Airplay (Radiomonitor)	8
New Zealand Hot Singles (RMNZ)	4
UK Singles (OCC)	76
US Billboard Hot 100	50
US Hot R&B/Hip-Hop Songs (Billboard)	11
US Rhythmic Airplay (Billboard)	14

=== Year-end charts ===
Year-end chart performance for "Owa Owa"
Chart (2025)	Position
US Hot R&B/Hip-Hop Songs (Billboard)	81
