= Virgo World =

Studio album by Lil Tecca
- Released: September 18, 2020
- Length: 45:41
- Label: Galactic; Republic
- Producer: Ambezza; BeatsByTrav; Blake Slatkin; Blk; BRackz; C4Bombs; Cassell Beats; Census; Chek Beatz; Cxdy; DeeMarc; DJ Scheme; Evertime; FrankieOnTheGuitar; Jayron; Kid Culture; Leon Thomas; Menoh Beats; Mike Hector; MJ Nichols; Nick Mira; Nurі; OnlyKND; ProdByXavi; Repko; Rex Kudo; Rio Leyva; Rowan; Saint Luca; Sam Wish; Sean Turk; Sevn Thomas; Skrillex; Spaceman; Taz Taylor; Tommy Brown; TheSkyBeats; Tobi Aitch; TxbiTheTeenvger; Z3N

Lil Tecca chronology
We Love You Tecca (2019)	Virgo World (2020)	We Love You Tecca 2 (2021)

Singles from Virgo World
- 1. "Out of Love" Released: April 17, 2020; 2. "Royal Rumble" Released: August 26, 2020; 3. "Our Time" Released: September 11, 2020; 4. "Dolly" Released: September 18, 2020

Virgo World is the debut studio album by American rapper Lil Tecca. It was released through Galactic and Republic Records on September 18, 2020. The album features guest appearances from Polo G, Lil Durk, Nav, Skrillex, DJ Scheme, Lil Uzi Vert, Guwop Reign, and Tecca's record label Internet Money. It follows his debut mixtape and project, We Love You Tecca, which was released in 2019. The album title comes from Tecca's astrological sign, Virgo, as he was born on August 26, 2002.

The album debuted at number ten on the US Billboard 200 with 35,000 sales in its first week, and debuted at number six on the Canadian Albums Chart. It received generally positive reviews.

== Background ==
The album's title comes from Lil Tecca's astrological sign, Virgo, being born on August 26, 2002. It is believed that Virgos are logical, persistent, perfectionistic, and practical, but sometimes feel shy and overly critical. Virgos are born any time from August 23 to September 22. The rapper had been teasing it for over a year prior to its release, posting snippets of a few songs. On September 4, 2020, it was speculated that it would be released soon.

== Singles ==
The album's lead single, "Out of Love", featuring Lil Tecca's record label Internet Money, was released on April 17, 2020. The second single, "Royal Rumble", was released on his 18th birthday, August 26, 2020. The third and final pre-release single, "Our Time", was released on September 11, 2020, and introduced as the intro to the album. "Dolly", a collaboration with fellow American rapper Lil Uzi Vert, was released along with the album as its fourth and final single, on September 18, 2020.

== Commercial performance ==
Virgo World debuted at number ten on the US Billboard 200 with 35,000 sales in its first week, falling behind his debut mixtape and project, We Love You Tecca, which debuted at number four in the previous year. It debuted at number six on the Canadian Albums Chart. It also charted in Australia, Belgium, the Netherlands, Ireland, and the United Kingdom.

== Critical reception ==
Professional ratings
Review scores
Source	Rating
AllMusic	3.5/5 stars
Pitchfork	6/10

Writing for Def Pen, Ryan Shepard offered a positive review, going on to opine that "he has shown and proved that he is looking to stay in this industry". On a mixed review of the album, Alphonse Pierre of Pitchfork expressed his confusion with the clear meaning of the lyrics and that "a pocketful of catchy melodies and bubbly rhythms don't make up for a lack of anything interesting to say." Alex Zidel of HotNewHipHop gave a neutral review, explaining that "while his move to island-based production adds to some much-needed substance of Lil Tecca, it fails to come across as an authentic."

== Track listing ==
Virgo World track listing
No.	Title	Writer(s)	Producer(s)	Length
1.	"Our Time"	Tyler-Justin Sharpe; Jeroen Groenendijk	Jayron Beats	1:38
2.	"Actin Up"	Sharpe; Bailey Cassell	CassellBeats	1:57
3.	"When You Down" (with Polo G featuring Lil Durk)	Sharpe; Taurus Bartlett; Durk Banks; DeMarcus Morgan	DeeMarc	3:13
4.	"Back It Up"	Sharpe; Rupert Thomas, Jr.; Leon Thomas; Masamune Kudo; Michael Hector; Carlos Martin	Sevn Thomas; L. Thomas; Rex Kudo; Hector^{[a]}; Rowan^{[a]}	2:34
5.	"Chemistry"	Sharpe; Brandon Craig	OnlyKND	2:13
6.	"Royal Rumble"	Sharpe; Sean Turk; Juan Guerrieri-Maril	Turk; Z3N	2:39
7.	"Foreign" (featuring Nav)	Sharpe; Navraj Goraya; Danny Snodgrass, Jr.; Michael Romito; Rio Leyva; William Repko II; Campbell Rolston-Clemmer	Taz Taylor; Census; Leyva; Repko; Spaceman	2:13
8.	"Selection" (with Skrillex and DJ Scheme)	Sharpe; Sonny Moore; Gabriel Guerra; Nuri Saberin	Skrillex; DJ Scheme; Nuri	1:40
9.	"Take 10"	Sharpe; Thomas Brown; Mathias Liyew; Courageous Herrera	Brown; Ambezza; ProdByXavi	2:24
10.	"Dolly" (with Lil Uzi Vert)	Sharpe; Symere Woods; Roc-Jonas Balhoud; Brandon Brown; Rodrequez Yancy	TxbiTheTeenvger; B Rackz; C4Bombs	2:59
11.	"Insecurities"	Sharpe; Snodgrass; Nicholas Mira	Taz Taylor; Mira	2:18
12.	"Tic Toc"	Sharpe; Amin Elamin	Menoh Beats	2:32
13.	"Miss Me"	Sharpe; Samuel Wish; Blake Slatkin; Daniel Hackett	Wish; Slatkin; Kid Culture	1:58
14.	"True to the Game" (featuring Guwop Reign)	Sharpe; Reign Mutaawe; Snodgrass; Romito; Rolston-Clemmer	Taz Taylor; Census; Spaceman	2:56
15.	"Closest to Heaven"	Sharpe; Snodgrass; Leyva; Blair Ferguson	Taz Taylor; Leyva; Blk	1:59
16.	"Level Up"	Sharpe; Kamaldeen Folami	Chek Beatz	2:16
17.	"No Answers"	Sharpe; Eeti Erätuli; Huthman Olukunle	Evertime; Tobi Aitch	2:50
18.	"Last Call"	Sharpe; Snodgrass; Cody Rounds; Francisco Baptista; Travis Pierce; Maxwell Nichols	Taz Taylor; Cxdy; FrankieOnTheGuitar; BeatsByTrav; MJ Nichols	2:39
19.	"Out of Love" (featuring Internet Money)	Sharpe; Snodgrass; Repko; Anders Lunøe; Frederik Thrane	Taz Taylor; Repko; TheSkyBeats; Saint Luca	2:34
Total length:				45:41

Notes

- ^{^[a]} signifies an additional producer

== Personnel ==
Performers

- Lil Tecca – primary artist (all tracks)
- Polo G – primary artist (track 3)
- Lil Durk – featured artist (track 3)
- Nav – featured artist (track 7)
- Skrillex – primary artist (track 8)
- DJ Scheme – primary artist (track 8)
- Lil Uzi Vert – primary artist (track 10)
- Guwop Reign – featured artist (track 14)
- Internet Money – featured artist (track 19)

Technical

- Alex Tumay – mixing, studio personnel (tracks 1, 2, 7–11, 14, 15, 17, 18)
- Chris Gehringer – mastering, studio personnel (all tracks)
- Joseph Colmenero – engineering (tracks 1–3, 5–7, 9–11, 14–19), (tracks 3, 5, 12, 13, 16), studio personnel (tracks 1–3, 5–7, 9–19)
- Rex Kudo – keyboards (track 4), programming (track 4), engineering (track 8), studio personnel (track 8)
- Menoh Beats – engineering, programming, studio personnel (track 12)
- Blake Slatkin – engineering, studio personnel (track 13)
- Edgar Herrera – mixing, studio personnel (track 19)
- Jayron Beats – programming (track 1)
- CassellBeats – programming (track 2)
- Deemarc – programming (track 3)
- Sevn Thomas – programming (track 4)
- Leon Thomas – programming (track 4)
- Mike Hector – programming (track 4)
- Rowan – programming (track 4)
- OnlyKND – programming (track 5)
- Sean Turk – programming (track 6)
- Z3N – programming (track 6)
- Taz Taylor – programming (tracks 7, 11, 15, 18, 19)
- Census – programming (track 7)
- Rio Leyva – programming (tracks 7, 14, 15)
- Repko – programming (tracks 7, 14, 19)
- Spaceman – programming (tracks 7, 14)
- Skrillex – programming (track 8)
- DJ Scheme – programming (track 8)
- Nuri – programming (track 8)
- Tommy Brown – programming (track 9)
- Ambezza – programming (track 9)
- ProdByXavi – programming (track 9)
- TxbiTheTeenvger – programming (track 10)
- Nick Mira – programming (track 11)
- Sam Wish – programming (track 13)
- Blake Slatkin – programming (track 13)
- Kid Culture – programming (track 13)
- Blk – programming (track 15)
- Chek Beatz – programming (track 16)
- Evertime – programming (track 17)
- Tobi Aitch – programming (track 17)
- Cxdy – programming (track 18)
- FrankieOnTheGuitar – programming (track 18)
- BeatsByTrav – programming (track 18)
- MJ Nichols – programming (track 18)
- Saint Luca – programming (track 19)

== Charts ==
Chart (2020)	Peak position
Australian Albums (ARIA)	61
Belgian Albums (Ultratop Flanders)	102
Canadian Albums (Billboard)	6
Dutch Albums (Album Top 100)	39
Irish Albums (IRMA)	38
UK Albums (OCC)	42
US Billboard 200	10
US Top R&B/Hip-Hop Albums (Billboard)	7
