= Dolly (song) =

Single by Lil Tecca and Lil Uzi Vert

Single by Lil Tecca and Lil Uzi Vert

from the album Virgo World
- Released: September 18, 2020
- Length: 3:00
- Label: Galactic; Republic
- Songwriters: Tyler-Justin Anthony Sharpe; Symere Woods; Brandon Brown; Roc-Jonas Balhoud; Rodrequez Yancy
- Producers: BRackz; C4Bombs; TXBITHETEENVGER

Lil Tecca singles chronology
"Our Time" (2020)	"Dolly" (2020)	"Jetski" (2021)

Lil Uzi Vert singles chronology
"Patek/Over Your Head" (2020)	"Dolly" (2020)	"Diamond Choker" (2020)

Music video
- "Dolly" on YouTube

"Dolly" is a song by American rappers Lil Tecca and Lil Uzi Vert, released on September 18, 2020, as the fourth single from Tecca's debut studio album, Virgo World. The track was produced by BRackz, C4Bombs and TXBITHETEENVGER.

== Background ==
The song was originally leaked in 2018 with only Lil Uzi Vert on the track, and was remixed by Lil Tecca in 2019. Uzi confirmed that Tecca was on the newer version in 2020. The song is named after rapper Young Thug's sister, Dolly White.

== Critical reception ==
Orlando Dowlatt of Urban Islandz called Lil Tecca's flow on the track "smooth but quite interesting", and complimented Lil Uzi Vert's verse as a "scorcher".

== Music video ==
The official music video for the track was released the same day as the song on September 18, 2020, directed by Cole Bennett.

== Charts ==
Chart (2020)	Peak position
Global 200 (Billboard)	132
Canada (Canadian Hot 100)	63
New Zealand Hot Singles (RMNZ)	15
US Billboard Hot 100	80
US Hot R&B/Hip-Hop Songs (Billboard)	26
