= Repeat It (Lil Tecca and Gunna song) =

2021 single by Lil Tecca featuring Gunna

Single by Lil Tecca and Gunna

from the album We Love You Tecca 2
- Released: August 6, 2021
- Length: 3:10
- Label: Galactic; Republic
- Songwriters: Tyler-Justin Sharpe; Sergio Kitchens; Danny Lee Snodgrass, Jr.; Nico Baran; Mike Romito; Jocelyn Donald
- Producers: Taz Taylor; Nico Baran; Census

Lil Tecca singles chronology
"Money on Me" (2021)	"Repeat It" (2021)

Gunna singles chronology
"Waves" (2021)	"Repeat It" (2021)	"London" (2021)

Music video
- "Repeat It" on YouTube

"Repeat It" is a song by American rappers Lil Tecca and Gunna, released on August 6, 2021, as the third single from his second mixtape We Love You Tecca 2 (2021). It was produced by Taz Taylor, Census and Nico Baran.

== Composition ==
In the song, Lil Tecca and Gunna sing about the "multiple ways" they "flex their wealth". Tecca also shouts out to his home state of New York: "I'm in New York, where it be cold / Look at my neck, 'cause it's iced out / I'm in the field, we goin' up (Yeah) / Told 'em to cut all the lights out".

== Critical reception ==
In an interview with XXL, Lil Tecca complimented Gunna's guest verse: "this nigga going crazy. It was lit. I ain't even gon' lie." Mackenzie Cummings-Grady of Complex wrote that "Tecca's vibrant flow skates along the track's silky production, while Gunna comes through with his drippy machismo halfway through."

== Music video ==
A music video directed by filmmaking duo Stripmall was released on August 10, 2021. It features "fluorescent colors" and "pink and purple tones". The video shows Lil Tecca in his bedroom with a female friend, and riding in a luxury car in the city streets. Gunna appears within a "psychedelic" forest delivering his verse, before Tecca joins him at a party.

== Charts ==
Chart performance for "Repeat It"
Chart (2021)	Peak position
Canada Hot 100 (Billboard)	39
Global 200 (Billboard)	125
New Zealand Hot Singles (RMNZ)	13
US Billboard Hot 100	80
US Hot R&B/Hip-Hop Songs (Billboard)	28
US Hot Rap Songs (Billboard)	20
US Rhythmic Airplay (Billboard)	31
US Rolling Stone Top 100	52

== Certifications ==
Certifications for "Repeat It"
Region	Certification	Certified units/sales
Canada (Music Canada)	Gold	40,000^{‡}
United States (RIAA)	Platinum	1,000,000^{‡}
^{‡} Sales+streaming figures based on certification alone.
