= Out of Love (Lil Tecca song) =

2020 single by Lil Tecca

Single by Lil Tecca featuring Internet Money

from the album Virgo World
- Released: April 17, 2020
- Genre: Hip hop
- Length: 2:34
- Label: Galactic; Republic
- Songwriters: Anders Lunøe; Danny Lee Snodgrass, Jr.; Frederik Thrane; Tyler-Justin Anthony Sharpe; William Repko II
- Producers: Saint Luca Beats; Taz Taylor; TheSkyBeats; Repko

Lil Tecca singles chronology
"All Star" (2020)	"Out of Love" (2020)	"Royal Rumble" (2020)

Lyric video
- "Out of Love" on YouTube

"Out of Love" is a song by American rapper Lil Tecca featuring hip-hop collective Internet Money, released on April 17, 2020, as the lead single from Tecca's debut studio album, Virgo World. The track is produced by Saint Luca Beats, Taz Taylor, TheSkyBeats and Repko.

== Background ==
"Out of Love" was initially intended as the lead single from a collaboration project between Tecca and Internet Money titled Do They Really Love You. However, the project was not released and the single ended up appearing on Tecca's debut studio album, Virgo World.

== Critical reception ==
Erika Marie of HotNewHipHop called the song's hook "catchy".

== Music video ==
The official music video for the track was released on June 30, 2020. The video was directed by Omar Jones.

== Charts ==
Chart (2020)	Peak position
New Zealand Hot Singles (RMNZ)	15
US Rhythmic (Billboard)	34

== Certifications ==
Region	Certification	Certified units/sales
Brazil (Pro-Música Brasil)	Gold	20,000^{‡}
New Zealand (RMNZ)	Gold	15,000^{‡}
United Kingdom (BPI)	Silver	200,000^{‡}
United States (RIAA)	Platinum	1,000,000^{‡}
^{‡} Sales+streaming figures based on certification alone.
