= Lil Tecca =

American rapper (born 2002)

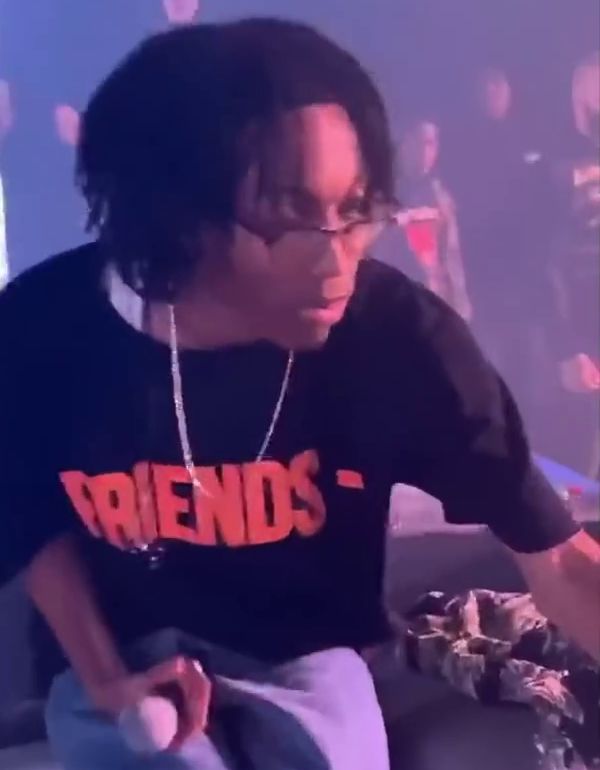
- Lil Tecca in 2019

Background information
- Born: Tyler-Justin Anthony Sharpe; August 26, 2002 (age 24); New York City, U.S.
- Occupations: Rapper; singer-songwriter; record producer
- Works: Discography
- Years active: 2017–present
- Labels: Galactic; Republic
- Website: Official website

Tyler-Justin Anthony Sharpe (born August 26, 2002), known professionally as Lil Tecca, is an American rapper, singer-songwriter, and record producer. Lil Tecca rose to mainstream prominence with the release of the 2019 single "Ransom", which peaked at number four on the Billboard Hot 100. The song preceded the release of his debut mixtape We Love You Tecca (2019), which peaked at number four on the Billboard 200 and contained the follow-up singles "Love Me" and "Did It Again".

His debut studio album, Virgo World (2020), peaked at number ten on the Billboard 200, as did his second album, We Love You Tecca 2 (2021). His third album, Tec (2023), was followed by his fourth and fifth albums, Plan A (2024) and Dopamine (2025), both of which continued his series of top ten debuts on the chart. In addition to receiving an Icon Series Outfit, he was announced as the Fortnite Festival Season 15 headliner.

== Early life ==
Tyler-Justin Anthony Sharpe was born on August 26, 2002, in Queens, New York City, to Jamaican immigrant parents. He grew up in the Springfield Gardens neighborhood of Queens. Sharpe's upbringing in Queens exposed him to diverse cultural influences. Sharpe relocated from Queens to Cedarhurst, a village located in Nassau County on Long Island, New York, where he attended Lawrence High School. Growing up, Sharpe dreamed of playing in the NBA. At 12 years old, he redirected his focus toward music, drawn to hip-hop and inspired by artists like Chief Keef and Speaker Knockerz.

== Career ==
=== 2011–2018: Early career and musical career beginnings ===
At the age of 9, Tecca became interested in music after he began rapping over his mic while playing a game on Xbox with his friends. Tecca and his friends started targeting each other with diss tracks, with Tecca uploading two of these songs onto his account on SoundCloud. However, those tracks have since been removed. Tecca's first notable release was a track called "Tectri", released in 2017, which was a collaborative single with Gummybear. Following the release of "Tectri", Tecca continued releasing early tracks, including "Callin", among others.

=== 2019–2021: "Ransom", We Love You Tecca, and Virgo World ===
On October 29, 2018, Tecca released a single, called "Love Me". The song was produced by Dystinkt Beats. Upon its release, the song debuted at number 72 on the Canadian Hot 100. It also debuted at number 65 on the US Rolling Stone Top 100. His music career began with his song "Ransom", which was originally uploaded to Cole Bennett's Lyrical Lemonade YouTube channel on May 22, 2019. Pitchfork described the song as "traditional" cloud rap with bittersweet, "trippy" production. "Ransom" reached its peak at number 4 on the Billboard Hot 100 chart accumulating over 1.4 billion streams on Spotify and 500 million views on YouTube.

On July 24, Tecca released a single titled "Did It Again". Upon its release, the song debuted at 64 on the Billboard Hot 100, making it his second entry after "Ransom". As of October 23, 2023, the single would become certified two-times platinum by the Recording Industry Association of America (RIAA) for combined sales and streaming equivalent units of over two million units in the United States. On August 14, 2019, Tecca released the remix to "Ransom" with Juice Wrld to his account on SoundCloud. The remix was released on other platforms the following day. The track was mixed by Taz Taylor and Nick Mira. The remix was later added to his debut mixtape, titled We Love You Tecca, alongside the original version of the record, which was released on August 30, peaking at number 4 on the US Billboard 200. Following the mixtape's success, Tecca collaborated with Internet Money and A Boogie Wit da Hoodie on their track titled "Somebody", which was released on October 11, 2019. Produced by Nick Mira and Taz Taylor, the song debuted at number 96 on the Billboard Hot 100. He released a track called "Glo Up" later in that same month. On December 16, Tecca then released the single "Why You Look Mad" which was produced by Ginseng and Rio Leyva.

On January 31, 2020, Tecca appeared as a featured artist on The Kid Laroi's "Diva". It peaked at number 76 on the ARIA Singles Chart. On February 7, Tecca released a track titled "IDK". On March 13, Tecca released his single "All Star", a collaboration with Lil Tjay, accompanied by a music video. On April 17, he released the track "Out of Love", featuring Internet Money. The music video for the track, directed by Omar Jones, was released on June 30. On August 27, he appeared as a featured artist on Internet Money's "JLO", which was released through 10K Projects.

On September 18, Tecca released his debut studio album, Virgo World. "Dolly", featuring Lil Uzi Vert, was released that same day. On March 26, 2021, Internet Money released a track called "Jetski" which features a guest appearance from Tecca and Lil Mosey. Although it did not chart on the Billboard Hot 100, the song peaked at number 19 on the Bubbling Under the Hot 100 and number 88 on the Canadian Hot 100.

=== 2022–2024: We Love You Tecca 2, Tec, and Plan A ===
On April 6, 2021, Tecca released the single "Show Me Up", produced by Niko East. On May 6, he followed up with his single "Never Left" which peaked at number 56 on the US Billboard Hot 100 and number 28 on the Rolling Stone Top 100. Tecca released the track "Money on Me" on July 23, followed by "Repeat It", featuring American rapper Gunna, on August 6.

On August 27, Tecca released his second studio album, We Love You Tecca 2, as a sequel to his debut mixtape of the same name. The album contains guest appearances from Gunna, Iann Dior, Chief Keef, Trippie Redd, Nav, and Lil Yachty. On September 1, 2021, the deluxe edition was released. Tecca made guest appearances on Bankrol Hayden's "Come Through" on September 24, and 24kGoldn's "Prada" on October 8, 2021. The latter song peaked at number 18 on New Zealand Hot Singles. He later went on the Tecca Loves You Tour with tana, Bktherula, and yvngxchris.

On January 28, 2022, Tecca released his new single "Fallin". The song was written by Tecca alongside Amin Elamin and Nathan Andrew Chen. The song was produced by Menoh Beats and Ninetyniine with an accompanying music video released the same day. On February 25, ArrDee released a remix to "Flowers (Say My Name)", which features a guest appearance from Tecca. Produced by WhYJay and LiTek, the song gained attention for Tecca's melodic verse, in which he raps about his love interest. On June 29, Tecca collaborated with English singer Mabel on "Let Love Go", a track from her second studio album, About Last Night.... Tecca released two singles, "Faster" and "Treesha", in August 2022. His single, "Blessing", produced by Yung Tago, was released through Galactic Records on December 9.

In 2023, Tecca released four singles: "Need Me", "500lbs", "Hvn on Earth" with Kodak Black, and "Dead or Alive". On September 22, Tecca released his third studio album, titled Tec. Initially announced to be released in May, the album's release was delayed until late 2023. The album comprises 16 tracks, including one bonus track. Upon its release, Tec received generally positive reviews from critics and became Lil Tecca's third US top album, debuting at number eleven on the US Billboard 200. Following its release, several songs from the album charted on the Billboard Hot 100. The music video for "Down with Me" premiered on December 29, 2023, which led to the album's bonus track being released as a single on January 4, 2024.

In May 2024, Tecca released two songs, "Never Last" and "Number 2", alongside their music videos the same day. "Number 2" charted at number 45 on the Hot R&B/Hip-Hop Songs charts and number 18 on the New Zealand Hot Singles chart. "Never Last" reached number 29 on the New Zealand Hot Singles chart. On August 9, Tecca released the single "Taste" which charted at number 31 on the New Zealand Hot Singles chart. On August 30, he released the track "Bad Time". The song was first previewed on Instagram Live on June 24. In September 2024, Tecca announced his fourth studio album, Plan A, to be released on September 20. Upon its release Plan A debuted at number nine on the US Billboard 200 and number 66 on the UK Albums Chart. The album featured a sole guest appearance from Don Toliver.

=== 2025–present: Dopamine ===
On March 14, 2025, Tecca released the single "Dark Thoughts", for his fifth studio album, Dopamine. On May 30 he released the album's second single, "Owa Owa". The album was later released on June 13, 2025, featuring a guest appearance from Ken Carson.

== Personal life ==
During interviews in 2023 with Jazzys World TV and Complex, Lil Tecca said that if he were not a rapper, he would have pursued a career as a heart surgeon.

== Discography ==
- Virgo World (2020)
- We Love You Tecca 2 (2021)
- Tec (2023)
- Plan A (2024)
- Dopamine (2025)

== Filmography ==
In 2026, Tecca's voice appeared in season 15 of Fortnite Festival and playable cosmetics.

== Awards and nominations ==
List of awards and nominations earned by Lil Tecca
Award	Year (Note: Indicates the year of ceremony. Each year is linked to the article about the awards held that year, wherever possible.)	Recipient(s) and nominee(s)	Category	Result	Ref.
MTV Video Music Awards	2019	"Ransom"	Song of Summer	Nominated	
Streamy Awards	2019	Himself	Breakthrough Artist	Nominated	
MTV Europe Music Award	2020	Himself	Best Push Act	Nominated	
Billboard Music Awards	2020	"Ransom"	Top Rap Song	Nominated	
