= Ransom (Lil Tecca song) =

2019 single by Lil Tecca

Single by Lil Tecca

from the album We Love You Tecca
- Released: May 22, 2019
- Genre: Trap
- Length: 2:11: 2:53 (Remix)
- Label: Galactic; Republic
- Songwriters: Tyler-Justin Sharpe; Danny Snodgrass, Jr.; Nicholas Mira
- Producers: Nick Mira; Taz Taylor

Lil Tecca singles chronology
"Molly Girl" (2019)	"Ransom" (2019)	"Bossanova" (2019)

Music video
- "Ransom" on YouTube

Remix cover
- Juice WRLD remix cover

"Ransom" (stylized as "RAN$OM") is a song by American rapper Lil Tecca, initially released independently on May 22, 2019, then later through Galactic Records and Republic Records. It serves as the second single from his debut mixtape We Love You Tecca. The song has since come to be regarded as Lil Tecca's signature song.

The song was produced by Nick Mira and Taz Taylor, and debuted at number 93 on the US Billboard Hot 100 before reaching number 4. Outside the United States, "Ransom" peaked within the top ten of the charts in Australia, Canada, Denmark, Finland, New Zealand, Norway, Portugal, the Republic of Ireland, Sweden and the United Kingdom. It was later followed up by a remix with fellow rapper Juice Wrld in August 2019.

== Background ==
The song was considered the breakthrough of Queens-based rapper Lil Tecca, who began releasing songs through SoundCloud in 2018. The song was recorded January 4, 2019, and later remixed by rapper Juice WRLD on August 1, 2019. It was recorded at the Internet Money Home Recording Studio, Hollywood, Los Angeles, California, United States of America.

== Critical reception ==
Sheldon Pearce of Pitchfork noted that the bounce in Lil Tecca's singsong flows relies heavily on Auto-Tune. Pearce observed that his bittersweet melodies are as indebted to local hero A Boogie wit da Hoodie as they are to the gloomy style of Juice WRLD. While finding that the lyrics follow the traditional rapper playbook practically to the letter, Pearce stated that even now he is capable of making the profound seem simple.

== Music video ==
The music video was released on May 22, 2019, and was directed and edited by Cole Bennett. It was shot in the Dominican Republic.

== Remix ==
On August 14, 2019, Lil Tecca released the remix of the song on his SoundCloud with Juice Wrld, who has also worked with Nick Mira on other songs, including "Lucid Dreams". The remix was released on other platforms the following day. The track was mixed by Taz Taylor and Nick Mira. The remix later got added to his debut mixtape We Love You Tecca alongside the original version.

== Charts ==
=== Original version ===
==== Weekly charts ====
Chart (2019)	Peak position
Australia (ARIA)	8
Austria (Ö3 Austria Top 40)	39
Belgium (Ultratop 50 Flanders)	15
Belgium (Ultratop 50 Wallonia)	39
Canada Hot 100 (Billboard)	2
Czech Republic Singles Digital (ČNS IFPI)	11
Denmark (Tracklisten)	5
Finland (Suomen virallinen lista)	4
France (SNEP)	25
Germany (GfK)	44
Greece International (IFPI)	2
Hungary (Single Top 40)	9
Ireland (IRMA)	3
Latvia (LAIPA)	2
Lithuania (AGATA)	4
Netherlands (Single Top 100)	16
New Zealand (Recorded Music NZ)	2
Norway (VG-lista)	3
Portugal (AFP)	6
Scottish Singles Sales (Official Charts)	57
Singapore (RIAS)	29
Slovakia Singles Digital (ČNS IFPI)	15
Spain (Promusicae)	63
Sweden (Sverigetopplistan)	3
Switzerland (Schweizer Hitparade)	15
UK Singles (Official Charts)	7
US Billboard Hot 100	4
US Hot R&B/Hip-Hop Songs (Billboard)	2
US Hot Rap Songs (Billboard)	2
US Pop Airplay (Billboard)	28
US Rhythmic Airplay (Billboard)	1
US Rolling Stone Top 100	2

Chart (2024–2025)	Peak position
Global 200 (Billboard)	163

==== Year-end charts ====
Chart (2019)	Position
Australia (ARIA)	85
Belgium (Ultratop Flanders)	70
Canada (Canadian Hot 100)	20
Denmark (Tracklisten)	48
Hungary (Stream Top 40)	55
Iceland (Tónlistinn)	83
Ireland (IRMA)	48
Latvia (LAIPA)	19
Netherlands (Single Top 100)	72
New Zealand (Recorded Music NZ)	40
Norway (VG-lista)	27
Portugal (AFP)	37
Sweden (Sverigetopplistan)	44
Switzerland (Schweizer Hitparade)	83
UK Singles (OCC)	53
US Billboard Hot 100	28
US Hot R&B/Hip-Hop Songs (Billboard)	10
US Rhythmic (Billboard)	21
US Rolling Stone Top 100	13

Chart (2020)	Position
Canada (Canadian Hot 100)	45
Portugal (AFP)	73

=== Remix ===
Chart (2019)	Peak position
Italy (FIMI)	40
New Zealand Hot Singles (RMNZ)	8
US Rolling Stone Top 100	34

== Certifications ==
Region	Certification	Certified units/sales
Australia (ARIA)	3× Platinum	210,000^{‡}
Belgium (BRMA)	Platinum	40,000^{‡}
Brazil (Pro-Música Brasil)	Diamond	160,000^{‡}
Canada (Music Canada)	6× Platinum	480,000^{‡}
Denmark (IFPI Danmark)	Platinum	90,000^{‡}
France (SNEP)	Diamond	333,333^{‡}
Germany (BVMI)	Gold	200,000^{‡}
Italy (FIMI)	Platinum	70,000^{‡}
New Zealand (RMNZ)	5× Platinum	150,000^{‡}
Poland (ZPAV)	2× Platinum	100,000^{‡}
Portugal (AFP)	3× Platinum	30,000^{‡}
Spain (Promusicae)	Platinum	60,000^{‡}
United Kingdom (BPI)	2× Platinum	1,200,000^{‡}
United States (RIAA)	9× Platinum	9,000,000^{‡}
^{‡} Sales+streaming figures based on certification alone.
