= List of number-one singles of 2020 (Ireland) =

The Irish Singles Chart ranks the best-performing singles in Ireland, as compiled by the Official Charts Company on behalf of the Irish Recorded Music Association.

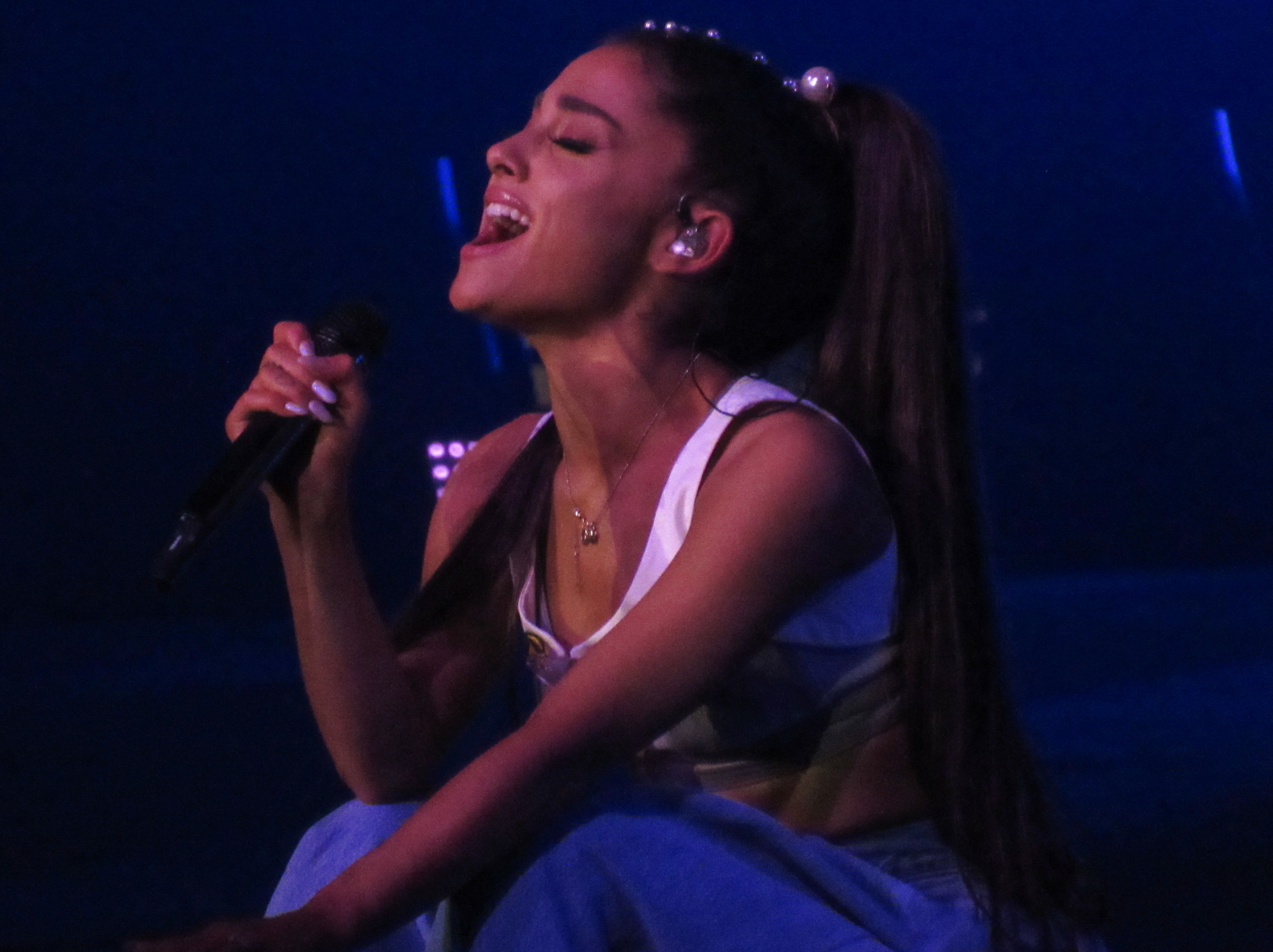
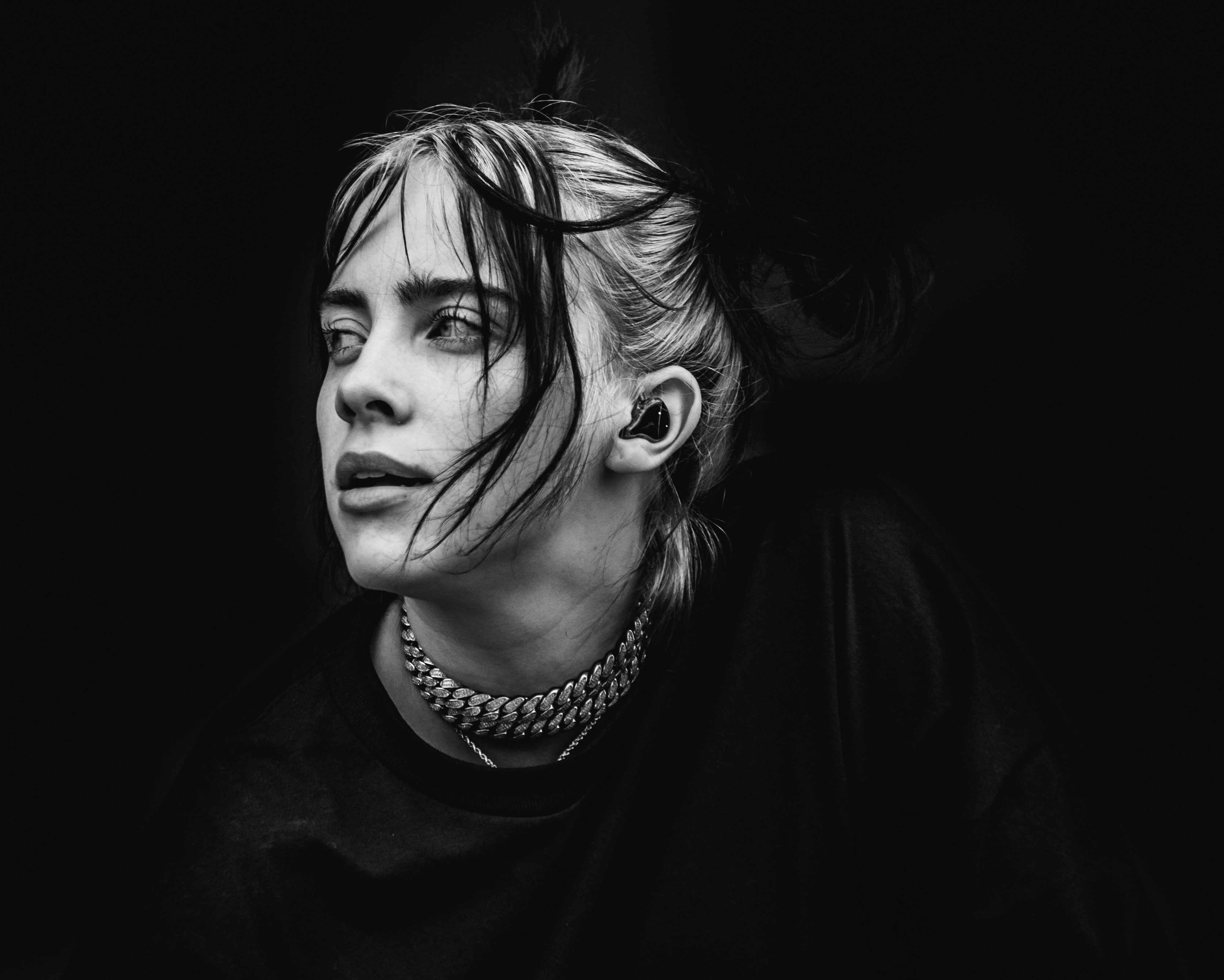
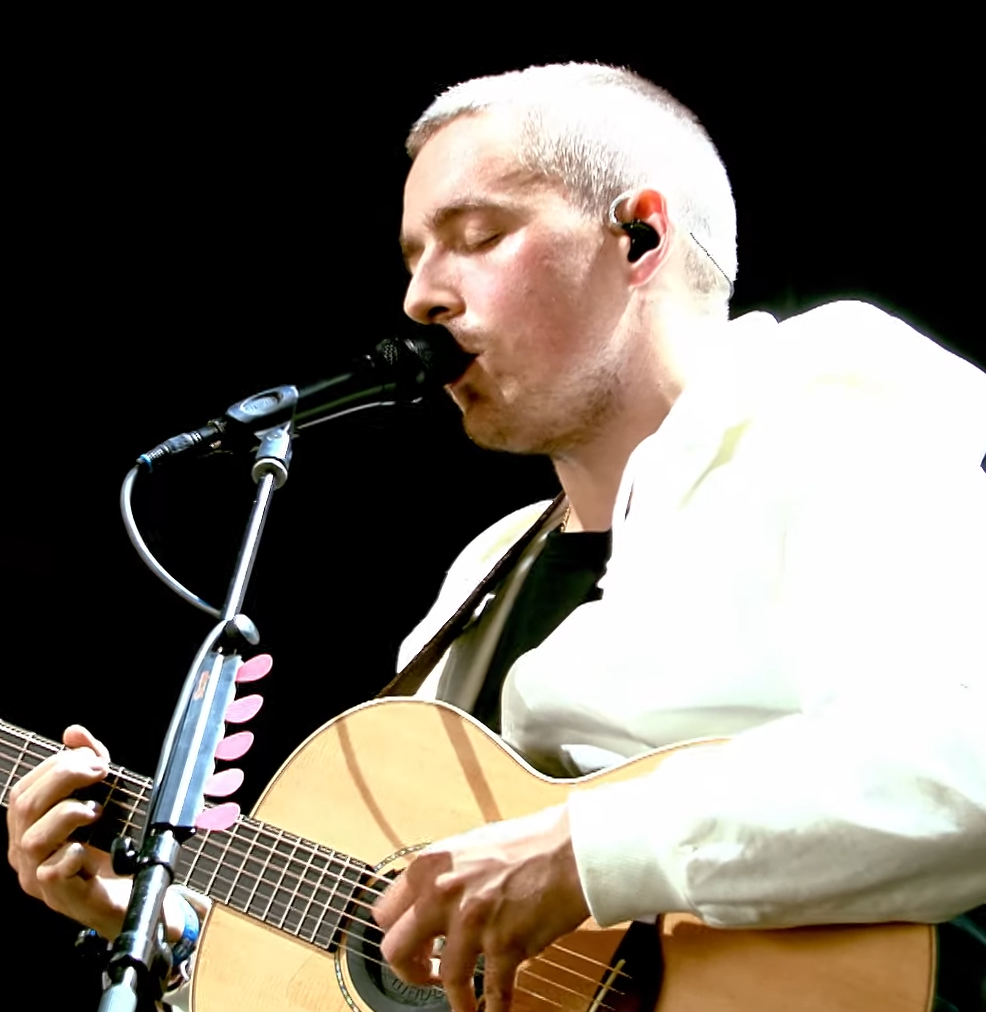
With two number one singles each Ariana Grande, Billie Eilish and Dermot Kennedy were artists with the most number one hits in 2020.

Issue date	Song	Artist(s)	Reference
3 January	"Before You Go"	Lewis Capaldi	
10 January	"Before You Go"	Lewis Capaldi	
17 January	"Before You Go"	Lewis Capaldi	
24 January	"Godzilla"	Eminem featuring Juice Wrld	
31 January	"Blinding Lights"	The Weeknd	
7 February	"Blinding Lights"	The Weeknd	
14 February	"Blinding Lights"	The Weeknd	
21 February	"No Time to Die"	Billie Eilish	
28 February	"Blinding Lights"	The Weeknd	
6 March	"Roses"	Saint Jhn	
13 March	"Roses"	Saint Jhn	
20 March	"Roses"	Saint Jhn	
27 March	"Roses"	Saint Jhn	
3 April	"Roses"	Saint Jhn	
10 April	"Roses"	Saint Jhn	
17 April	"Roses"	Saint Jhn	
24 April	"Roses"	Saint Jhn	
1 May	"Toosie Slide"	Drake	
8 May	"Toosie Slide"	Drake	
15 May	"Rockstar"	DaBaby featuring Roddy Ricch	
22 May	"Rockstar"	DaBaby featuring Roddy Ricch	
29 May	"Rain on Me"	Lady Gaga and Ariana Grande	
5 June	"Rockstar"	DaBaby featuring Roddy Ricch	
12 June	"Rockstar"	DaBaby featuring Roddy Ricch	
19 June	"Rockstar"	DaBaby featuring Roddy Ricch	
26 June	"Rockstar"	DaBaby featuring Roddy Ricch	
3 July	"Rockstar"	DaBaby featuring Roddy Ricch	
10 July	"Rockstar"	DaBaby featuring Roddy Ricch	
17 July	"Savage Love (Laxed – Siren Beat)"	Jawsh 685 and Jason Derulo	
24 July	"Head & Heart"	Joel Corry and MNEK	
31 July	"Head & Heart"	Joel Corry and MNEK	
7 August	"Head & Heart"	Joel Corry and MNEK	
14 August	"Head & Heart"	Joel Corry and MNEK	
21 August	"Head & Heart"	Joel Corry and MNEK	
28 August	"WAP"	Cardi B featuring Megan Thee Stallion	
4 September	"WAP"	Cardi B featuring Megan Thee Stallion	
11 September	"WAP"	Cardi B featuring Megan Thee Stallion	
18 September	"Mood"	24kGoldn featuring Iann Dior	
25 September	"Mood"	24kGoldn featuring Iann Dior	
2 October	"Mood"	24kGoldn featuring Iann Dior	
9 October	"Mood"	24kGoldn featuring Iann Dior	
16 October	"Looking for Me"	Paul Woolford and Diplo featuring Kareen Lomax	
23 October	"Looking for Me"	Paul Woolford and Diplo featuring Kareen Lomax	
30 October	"Positions"	Ariana Grande	
6 November	"Positions"	Ariana Grande	
13 November	"Positions"	Ariana Grande	
20 November	"Therefore I Am"	Billie Eilish	
27 November	"Paradise"	Meduza featuring Dermot Kennedy	
4 December	"Giants"	Dermot Kennedy	
11 December	"Giants"	Dermot Kennedy	
18 December	"Giants"	Dermot Kennedy	
25 December	"Giants"	Dermot Kennedy	

== Number-one artists ==
Position	Artist	Weeks at No. 1
1	Saint Jhn	8
1	DaBaby	8
1	Roddy Ricch	8
4	Joel Corry	5
4	MNEK	5
4	Dermot Kennedy	5
7	The Weeknd	4
7	24kGoldn	4
7	Iann Dior	4
7	Ariana Grande	4
11	Lewis Capaldi	3
11	Cardi B	3
11	Megan Thee Stallion	3
14	Drake	2
14	Paul Woolford	2
14	Diplo	2
14	Kareen Lomax	2
14	Billie Eilish	2
19	Eminem	1
19	Juice Wrld	1
19	Lady Gaga	1
19	Jawsh 685	1
19	Jason Derulo	1
19	Meduza	1
