= List of Billboard Streaming Songs number ones of 2020 =

This is a list of songs that reached number one on the Billboard magazine Streaming Songs chart in 2020.

== Chart history ==
Key
†	Indicates the most streamed song of 2020

Issue date	Song	Artist(s)	Weekly streams
January 4	"All I Want for Christmas Is You"	Mariah Carey	72.2 million
January 11	"The Box" †	Roddy Ricch	42.6 million
January 18	"The Box" †	Roddy Ricch	68.2 million
January 25	"The Box" †	Roddy Ricch	77.2 million
February 1	"The Box" †	Roddy Ricch	75 million
February 8	"The Box" †	Roddy Ricch	67 million
February 15	"The Box" †	Roddy Ricch	63.2 million
February 22	"The Box" †	Roddy Ricch	59.2 million
February 29	"The Box" †	Roddy Ricch	52.2 million
March 7	"The Box" †	Roddy Ricch	48.2 million
March 14	"The Box" †	Roddy Ricch	49.1 million
March 21	"The Box" †	Roddy Ricch	45.1 million
March 28	"The Box" †	Roddy Ricch	41.4 million
April 4	"Blinding Lights"	The Weeknd	32.1 million
April 11	"The Box" †	Roddy Ricch	33.7 million
April 18	"Toosie Slide"	Drake	55.5 million
April 25	"Toosie Slide"	Drake	37.2 million
May 2	"Toosie Slide"	Drake	31.5 million
May 9	"The Scotts"	The Scotts, Travis Scott & Kid Cudi	42.2 million
May 16	"Savage"	Megan Thee Stallion featuring Beyoncé	42.1 million
May 23	"Gooba"	6ix9ine	55.3 million
May 30	"Rockstar"	DaBaby featuring Roddy Ricch	34.3 million
June 6	"Rockstar"	DaBaby featuring Roddy Ricch	35.5 million
June 13	"Rockstar"	DaBaby featuring Roddy Ricch	34.8 million
June 20	"Rockstar"	DaBaby featuring Roddy Ricch	35.7 million
June 27	"Rockstar"	DaBaby featuring Roddy Ricch	39.8 million
July 4	"Rockstar"	DaBaby featuring Roddy Ricch	37.9 million
July 11	"Rockstar"	DaBaby featuring Roddy Ricch	43.7 million
July 18	"Rockstar"	DaBaby featuring Roddy Ricch	42.4 million
July 25	"Come & Go"	Juice Wrld with Marshmello	36.4 million
August 1	"Rockstar"	DaBaby featuring Roddy Ricch	36.2 million
August 8	"Cardigan"	Taylor Swift	34 million
August 15	"Rockstar"	DaBaby featuring Roddy Ricch	30.2 million
August 22	"WAP"	Cardi B featuring Megan Thee Stallion	93 million
August 29	"Laugh Now Cry Later"	Drake featuring Lil Durk	69.8 million
September 5	"WAP"	Cardi B featuring Megan Thee Stallion	65 million
September 12	"WAP"	Cardi B featuring Megan Thee Stallion	58.5 million
September 19	"WAP"	Cardi B featuring Megan Thee Stallion	48.2 million
September 26	"WAP"	Cardi B featuring Megan Thee Stallion	41.5 million
October 3	"WAP"	Cardi B featuring Megan Thee Stallion	35.8 million
October 10	"WAP"	Cardi B featuring Megan Thee Stallion	31.6 million
October 17	"WAP"	Cardi B featuring Megan Thee Stallion	28.3 million
October 24	"WAP"	Cardi B featuring Megan Thee Stallion	25.9 million
October 31	"WAP"	Cardi B featuring Megan Thee Stallion	23.7 million
November 7	"Positions"	Ariana Grande	35.3 million
November 14	"Positions"	Ariana Grande	25.6 million
November 21	"Mood"	24kGoldn featuring Iann Dior	25.3 million
November 28	"Therefore I Am"	Billie Eilish	24.2 million
December 5	"Body"	Megan Thee Stallion	22.5 million
December 12	"All I Want for Christmas Is You"	Mariah Carey	26.4 million
December 19	"All I Want for Christmas Is You"	Mariah Carey	31.4 million
December 26	"All I Want for Christmas Is You"	Mariah Carey	40.5 million

== See also ==
- 2020 in American music
- List of Billboard Hot 100 number-one singles of 2020
