= List of number-one hits of 2020 (Denmark) =

Tracklisten is a chart that ranks the best-performing singles and tracks in Denmark. Its data, published by IFPI Denmark and compiled by Nielsen Music Control, is based collectively on each single's weekly digital sales.

== Chart history ==
Week	Issue date	Song	Artist(s)	Ref.
1	15 January 2020	"PUB G"	Lolo featuring Branco and Larry 44	
2	22 January 2020	"PUB G"	Lolo featuring Branco and Larry 44	
3	29 January 2020	"PUB G"	Lolo featuring Branco and Larry 44	
4	5 February 2020	"Blinding Lights"	The Weeknd	
5	12 February 2020	"Blinding Lights"	The Weeknd	
6	19 February 2020	"La danza"	Branco and Gilli	
7	26 February 2020	"La danza"	Branco and Gilli	
8	4 March 2020	"La danza"	Branco and Gilli	
9	11 March 2020	"La danza"	Branco and Gilli	
10	18 March 2020	"Blinding Lights"	The Weeknd	
11	25 March 2020	"Blinding Lights"	The Weeknd	
12	1 April 2020	"Blinding Lights"	The Weeknd	
13	8 April 2020	"Blinding Lights"	The Weeknd	
14	15 April 2020	"Blinding Lights"	The Weeknd	
15	22 April 2020	"Toosie Slide"	Drake	
16	29 April 2020	"Blinding Lights"	The Weeknd	
17	6 May 2020	"Sport"	TopGunn and Branco	
18	13 May 2020	"Tættere End Vi Tror"	P3 featuring Tessa, Lukas Graham, Mads Langer, Jada, Benjamin Hav, Clara and Don Stefano	
19	20 May 2020	"Tættere End Vi Tror"	P3 featuring Tessa, Lukas Graham, Mads Langer, Jada, Benjamin Hav, Clara and Don Stefano	
20	27 May 2020	"Kiki"	Lolo featuring Gilli	
21	3 June 2020	"Rockstar"	DaBaby featuring Roddy Ricch	
22	10 June 2020	"Rockstar"	DaBaby featuring Roddy Ricch	
23	17 June 2020	"Rockstar"	DaBaby featuring Roddy Ricch	
24	24 June 2020	"L.U.V"	Gilli	
25	1 July 2020	"L.U.V"	Gilli	
26	8 July 2020	"Snik snak"	Gilli	
27	15 July 2020	"ErruDumEllaHvad"	Icekiid	
28	22 July 2020	"ErruDumEllaHvad"	Icekiid	
29	29 July 2020	"ErruDumEllaHvad"	Icekiid	
30	5 August 2020	"ErruDumEllaHvad"	Icekiid	
31	12 August 2020	"Blå Himmel"	KESI featuring Hans Philip	
32	19 August 2020	"Solhverv"	Lord Siva	
33	26 August 2020	"Solhverv"	Lord Siva	
34	2 September 2020	"Solhverv"	Lord Siva	
35	9 September 2020	"Solhverv"	Lord Siva	
36	16 September 2020	"Mood"	24kGoldn featuring Iann Dior	
37	23 September 2020	"Mood"	24kGoldn featuring Iann Dior	
38	30 September 2020	"Mood"	24kGoldn featuring Iann Dior	
39	7 October 2020	"Mood"	24kGoldn featuring Iann Dior	
40	14 October 2020	"Mood"	24kGoldn featuring Iann Dior	
41	21 October 2020	"Mood"	24kGoldn featuring Iann Dior	
42	28 October 2020	"Dejlig"	Jimilian featuring Fouli	
43	4 November 2020	"Dejlig"	Jimilian featuring Fouli	
44	11 November 2020	"Hundo"	Branco	
45	18 November 2020	"Mood"	24kGoldn featuring Iann Dior	
46	25 November 2020	"Mood"	24kGoldn featuring Iann Dior	
47	2 December 2020	"Monster"	Shawn Mendes and Justin Bieber	
48	9 December 2020	"Last Christmas"	Wham!	
49	16 December 2020	"Last Christmas"	Wham!	
50	23 December 2020	"Last Christmas"	Wham!	
51	30 December 2020	"Last Christmas"	Wham!	
52	6 January 2021	"Solhverv"	Lord Siva	
