= Mood (24kGoldn song) =

2020 single by 24kGoldn featuring Iann Dior

Single by 24kGoldn featuring Iann Dior

from the album El Dorado
- Released: July 24, 2020
- Recorded: 2019
- Genre: Pop rock; hip-hop; rap rock
- Length: 2:20
- Label: Records; Columbia
- Songwriters: Golden Landis Von Jones; Michael Olmo; Blake Slatkin; Omer Fedi; Keegan Bach
- Producers: Omer Fedi; KBeazy; Blake Slatkin

24kGoldn singles chronology
"Eighties" (2020)	"Mood" (2020)	"Belt" (2020)

Iann Dior singles chronology
"Too Much" (2020)	"Mood" (2020)	"Ego" (2020)

Music video
- "Mood" on YouTube

"Mood" is a song by American rapper 24kGoldn featuring fellow American rapper Iann Dior. It was released on July 24, 2020, through Records and Columbia Records, as the lead single from 24kGoldn's debut studio album, El Dorado (2021). The pop rock and rap rock song is built around a guitar riff inspired by indie rock and post-grunge music and also features hi-hats and snare drums in the style of trap music. On the song, features 24kGoldn and Dior rap-singing about their toxic relationships in which their lovers are always in a "mood".

The song came about while the artists were playing Call of Duty together and producers Omer Fedi and KBeaZy were working on a beat, and 24kGoldn idly sang what would become the song's hook. After an early version of the song was completed, Blake Slatkin was soon brought on as a producer to make the song more pop-oriented. It became a commercial success after earning popularity on the video-sharing app TikTok and was certified quadruple platinum by the Recording Industry Association of America (RIAA). "Mood" peaked atop the Billboard Hot 100, where it spent eight non-consecutive weeks and also topped the charts in the United Kingdom, Australia, Ireland, Austria, Denmark, the Netherlands, Norway, and Sweden. It also reached number two on the Global 200. "Mood" was positively received by critics, who praised it as being catchy, and it was included on lists of the best songs of 2020 published by Slate, Billboard, and The New York Times. It was Billboard magazine's top rap song of 2021, claiming the top spot on the Billboard Year-End Hot Rap Songs of 2021.

24kGoldn and Dior performed the song live at the 2020 MTV Europe Music Awards preshow, the American Music Awards of 2020, the season 19 finale of The Voice, Dick Clark's New Year's Rockin' Eve, Jimmy Kimmel Live!, and The Ellen DeGeneres Show. A music video for "Mood", in which 24kGoldn and Dior have disputes with two separate girls, was released on August 5, 2020, and directed by Sebastian Sdaigui. A remix of the song with Canadian singer Justin Bieber and Colombian singer J Balvin was released on November 6, 2020.

== Background and promotion ==
"We made 'Mood' playing Call of Duty and drinking beer. We weren't in that thinking, like, 'All these notes have to be perfect together.' We were just chilling, and now it's one of the biggest songs in the world. 24kGoldn pulled up on me and my friend and I just were drinking Coronas."

— Dior, in an interview with NME.

According to 24kGoldn and Dior, they were playing Call of Duty while the song's producers, Fedi and KBeazy, were working on a beat, and as Fedi played a guitar riff, 24kGoldn idly began singing along with it. 24kGoldn then created a hook for the song while Dior performed a verse. After an early version of the song was written and produced by the four, producer Blake Slatkin was brought in to give the track a "pop polish".

24kGoldn teased a snippet of the song on his Instagram account before the song was officially released on July 24, 2020. To promote "Mood", Columbia Records pitched the song to various pop and "Gen Z" playlists on popular music streaming services. 24kGoldn's team also pitched the song to pop radio stations, and it quickly found success on contemporary hit radio. Video-sharing platform TikTok was also used as part of the marketing strategy to promote "Mood", and the song went from being used in approximately 12,000 videos on the platform in mid-August to over two million by October. 24kGoldn also used his own money to fund marketing campaigns for the song and get promotions from social media influencers.

== Composition ==
"Mood" is an uptempo pop rock, hip-hop and rap rock song, described by several publications as "genre-bending". This song is played in the key of G minor (in common time) with a tempo of 91 beats per minute, and 24kGoldn and Dior's vocals range from a low of F_{3} to a high of G_{4}. Its instrumental includes an indie and post-grunge-influenced guitar riff played by Omer Fedi (which is warped and echoed at points throughout the song), and "trap-style" hi-hats and snare drums.

In the song, 24kGoldn and Dior deliver "melodic croons" about their girlfriends who are always in a "mood", in a sing-song rapping style. Described by Vicky Inoyo of Earmilk as a love-centered song that provides "a youthful feel with modern-day pop twists", the lyrics detail how it feels to be in a toxic relationship. Tom Breihan of Stereogum wrote, "the two rappers don't really rap. Instead, they mewl everything in a familiar nasal whine-bleat." Variety's Charlie Amter wrote that the lyrics to the song's pre-chorus, "We play games of love to avoid the depression/We been here before/And I won't be your victim", are "morose", while Breihan described the pre-chorus as "a hymn to horny self-pity" and Slate's Chris Molanphy called it "very emo" and "Gen Z". Billboard similarly remarked that the song is "emo-leaning". HotNewHipHop's Alexander Cole called the track "perfect for summer", and said the song's title "certainly fits the vibe as we get a very summer-inspired beat". Rolling Stone's Ethan Millman called the beat of the song "bright" and "beachy" and the melody "carefree".

== Critical reception and accolades ==
For Billboard, Carl Lamarre stated that the song was a "feel-good record" and a "late-summer bop", describing the hook as "catchy", while Josh Glicksman of the same publication called the chorus "easily digestible" and "sonically light". Another Billboard writer, Andrew Unterberger, remarked that the song's energy felt "impossibly fresh" and that it is a "visceral banger". Chris Molanphy of Slate called the song "fiendishly catchy" and also praised the track's hook, opining that it was "one of the most instantly infectious rap-rock refrains ever". In his review of El Dorado, Kyann-Sian Williams of NME wrote that "Mood" was "spritely" and "tacked on at the end [of El Dorado] to act as a smug victory lap in the face of doubters". In another review of the album, Stereogum's Chris DeVille stated, "like hits from forebears like Juice Wrld, Post Malone, and Lil Uzi Vert, 'Mood' was self-evidently a pop song, infectiously catchy and irresistibly propulsive." DeVille added that the song "gracefully avoided" descending into the "unlistenable cheese" that the other pop-rock songs on the album did. Joe Coscarelli of The New York Times called "Mood" a "melodic-rap confection". KROQ-FM program director Mike Kaplan stated that "Mood" was "one of those first-listen records".

Slate's Chris Molanphy named "Mood" as the 12th best single of 2020, while Billboard named it the eighth best song, the third best rock song, and the 12th best musical TikTok trend of the year. On Jon Caramanica's list of the best songs of 2020 in The New York Times, "Mood" was added as an honorable mention. "Mood" was nominated for Best Collaboration at the 2021 iHeartRadio Music Awards. The song was also nominated for Top Hot 100 Song, Top Collaboration, and Top Rap Song at the 2021 Billboard Music Awards.

== Commercial performance ==
In its first week after being released, "Mood" sold 15,000 units. Following the song's viral TikTok success, "Mood" debuted on the US Billboard Hot 100 at number 84 in August 2020, jumping to number 26 the following week. After ten weeks of climbing the chart, the song reached number one on the chart dated October 24, when it received 20.3 million streams, sold 7,000 downloads, and made 62.9 million radio impressions. It became both 24kGoldn's and Dior's first number one on the chart, as well as Dior's first entry on the chart, and the first number one for any artist on the Records label. It also topped Billboard's Hot Rock & Alternative Songs, Hot Alternative Songs, and Hot Rap Songs charts, making it the first song to simultaneously top all four charts, and went on to top the Hot 100 for eight non-consecutive weeks. It also tied with Drake's "Nice for What" with the most climbs to the top spot at four when it returned to number one for a seventh non-consecutive week on the week ending January 9, 2021. "Mood" logged a 30th week inside the Hot 100's top ten, being the 12th song to do so.

"Mood" peaked at number one on the Mainstream Top 40 chart for eight consecutive weeks and broke the Mainstream Top 40 spin record, previously held by Ed Sheeran's 2017 song "Shape of You" with 17,707 plays, by logging 17,748 plays among the chart's reporting stations for the week of November 22. The song also had the longest run at number one on Mediabase's pop radio chart in 2020, with eight weeks. Following its debut on the Rolling Stone Top 100 in mid-August, "Mood" rose to the top of the chart after earning 20.6 million streams for the week dated November 6, 2020, where it spent two non-consecutive weeks. The song went on to be certified double platinum by the Recording Industry Association of America (RIAA) on December 1, 2020.

In the United Kingdom, "Mood" debuted at number 51 on the UK Singles Chart for the week ending August 27, 2020. After spending five weeks on the chart, the song topped the chart in the week ending October 1, 2020, after earning 61,000 chart sales and 7.8 million streams, and stayed at number one for four consecutive weeks. "Mood" also reached number one on the Australian ARIA Charts, where it spent eleven non-consecutive weeks at number one. It spent four weeks at the top spot on the Irish Singles Chart. The song topped the charts in several other countries as well, including the Austrian Ö3 Austria Top 40, Denmark's Tracklisten, the Dutch Single Top 100, Norway's VG-lista, and the Swedish Sverigetopplistan.

== Live performances and cover versions ==
24kGoldn and Dior made their debut television performance of "Mood" on Jimmy Kimmel Live! on October 26, 2020, followed by a performance on The Ellen DeGeneres Show on November 5, 2020, opening with a skit before singing the song on a sunflower-themed set. Later that month, they performed the track at the preshow for the 2020 MTV Europe Music Awards and at the 48th Annual American Music Awards, the latter of which was identified as a high of the night by Justin Curto of Vulture. The two went on to perform the song during the season 19 finale of the NBC television series The Voice, and also performed the song for ABC's Dick Clark's New Year's Rockin' Eve television special for 2021.

English indie rock band Glass Animals performed a cover of "Mood" for BBC Radio 1's Live Lounge program in November 2020. That same month, American post-hardcore band Our Last Night performed a cover of the song.

== Music video ==
The song's official video, directed by Sebastian Sdaigui, was released on August 5, 2020. It includes several different scenes. During Dior's verse, he is depicted in a "bleak" room with a girl, going from having romantic moments with her to arguing with her. During 24kGoldn's verse, he is shown sitting in a car with a different girl, who sees him texting someone and angrily leaves the car before picking up a baseball bat and threatening him with it. The video also shows the two in two different sunflower-themed sets, as well as standing in front of lightning.

== Personnel ==
Credits adapted from Tidal.

- 24kGoldn – vocals
- Iann Dior – vocals
- Blake Slatkin – production, engineering, bass, guitar, programming
- Omer Fedi – production, bass, guitar, programming
- KBeazy – production, programming
- Chris Gehringer – mastering
- Manny Marroquin – mixing
- Robin Florent – mixing
- Ryan Adam Cantu – engineering
- Chris Galland – assistant engineering
- Jeremie Inhaber – assistant engineering

== Charts ==
=== Weekly charts ===
Weekly chart performance for "Mood"
Chart (2020–2021)	Peak position
Argentina Hot 100 (Billboard)	21
Australia (ARIA)	1
Australia Urban (ARIA)	1
Austria (Ö3 Austria Top 40)	1
Belgium (Ultratop 50 Flanders)	2
Belgium (Ultratop 50 Wallonia)	2
Canada Hot 100 (Billboard)	1
Canada AC (Billboard)	23
Canada CHR/Top 40 (Billboard)	1
Canada Hot AC (Billboard)	4
Czech Republic Airplay (ČNS IFPI)	4
Czech Republic Singles Digital (ČNS IFPI)	1
Denmark (Tracklisten)	1
El Salvador (Monitor Latino)	15
Finland (Suomen virallinen lista)	3
France (SNEP)	7
Germany (GfK)	1
Global 200 (Billboard)	2
Greece International (IFPI)	4
Hungary (Rádiós Top 40)	2
Hungary (Single Top 40)	13
Hungary (Stream Top 40)	1
Iceland (Tónlistinn)	11
India International Singles (IMI)	2
Ireland (IRMA)	1
Italy (FIMI)	7
Lithuania (AGATA)	3
Malaysia (RIM)	10
Netherlands (Dutch Top 40)	3
Netherlands (Single Top 100)	1
New Zealand (Recorded Music NZ)	1
Norway (VG-lista)	1
Panama (Monitor Latino)	14
Poland Airplay (ZPAV)	3
Portugal (AFP)	1
Romania (Airplay 100)	1
San Marino (SMRRTV Top 50)	6
Scottish Singles Sales (Official Charts)	10
Singapore (RIAS)	4
Slovakia Airplay (ČNS IFPI)	7
Slovakia Singles Digital (ČNS IFPI)	1
Slovenia (SloTop50)	2
South Africa (RISA)	5
Spain (Promusicae)	27
Sweden (Sverigetopplistan)	1
Switzerland (Schweizer Hitparade)	1
UK Singles (Official Charts)	1
US Billboard Hot 100	1
US Adult Contemporary (Billboard)	20
US Adult Pop Airplay (Billboard)	1
US Dance Airplay (Billboard)	11
US Hot Rap Songs (Billboard)	1
US Hot Rock & Alternative Songs (Billboard)	1
US Pop Airplay (Billboard)	1
US Rhythmic Airplay (Billboard)	1
US Rock & Alternative Airplay (Billboard)	7
US Rolling Stone Top 100	1

=== Year-end charts ===
2020 year-end chart performance for "Mood"
Chart (2020)	Position
Australia (ARIA)	17
Austria (Ö3 Austria Top 40)	9
Belgium (Ultratop Flanders)	33
Belgium (Ultratop Wallonia)	55
Canada (Canadian Hot 100)	39
Denmark (Tracklisten)	14
France (SNEP)	67
Germany (Official German Charts)	18
Hungary (Stream Top 40)	13
Iceland (Tónlistinn)	94
Italy (FIMI)	53
Netherlands (Dutch Top 40)	18
Netherlands (Single Top 100)	17
New Zealand (Recorded Music NZ)	39
Norway (VG-lista)	8
Portugal (AFP)	27
Romania (Airplay 100)	74
Sweden (Sverigetopplistan)	11
Switzerland (Schweizer Hitparade)	16
UK Singles (OCC)	20
US Billboard Hot 100	47
US Hot Rap Songs (Billboard)	20
US Hot Rock & Alternative Songs (Billboard)	1
US Mainstream Top 40 (Billboard)	34
US Rhythmic (Billboard)	40

2021 year-end chart performance for "Mood"
Chart (2021)	Position
Australia (ARIA)	15
Austria (Ö3 Austria Top 40)	18
Belgium (Ultratop Flanders)	56
Belgium (Ultratop Wallonia)	62
Canada (Canadian Hot 100)	3
Denmark (Tracklisten)	38
France (SNEP)	53
Germany (Official German Charts)	20
Global 200 (Billboard)	10
Hungary (Rádiós Top 40)	10
Hungary (Stream Top 40)	25
Iceland (Tónlistinn)	61
India International Singles (IMI)	12
Ireland (IRMA)	37
Italy (FIMI)	84
Netherlands (Single Top 100)	78
New Zealand (Recorded Music NZ)	26
Norway (VG-lista)	36
Poland (ZPAV)	67
Portugal (AFP)	30
Sweden (Sverigetopplistan)	56
Switzerland (Schweizer Hitparade)	24
UK Singles (OCC)	46
US Billboard Hot 100	4
US Adult Contemporary (Billboard)	50
US Adult Top 40 (Billboard)	5
US Hot Rock & Alternative Songs (Billboard)	1
US Mainstream Top 40 (Billboard)	5
US Rhythmic (Billboard)	8
US Rock Airplay (Billboard)	32

2022 year-end chart performance for "Mood"
Chart (2022)	Position
Global 200 (Billboard)	149

=== All-time charts ===
All-time chart performance for "Mood"
Chart	Position
US Billboard Hot 100	49

== Certifications ==
Certifications for "Mood"
Region	Certification	Certified units/sales
Australia (ARIA)	7× Platinum	490,000^{‡}
Austria (IFPI Austria)	3× Platinum	90,000^{‡}
Belgium (BRMA)	2× Platinum	80,000^{‡}
Canada (Music Canada)	Diamond	800,000^{‡}
Denmark (IFPI Danmark)	3× Platinum	270,000^{‡}
France (SNEP)	Diamond	333,333^{‡}
Germany (BVMI)	2× Platinum	800,000^{‡}
Italy (FIMI)	3× Platinum	210,000^{‡}
Mexico (AMPROFON)	2× Platinum	120,000^{‡}
New Zealand (RMNZ)	6× Platinum	180,000^{‡}
Poland (ZPAV)	2× Platinum	40,000^{‡}
Portugal (AFP)	4× Platinum	40,000^{‡}
Spain (Promusicae)	2× Platinum	120,000^{‡}
Switzerland (IFPI Switzerland)	Platinum	20,000^{‡}
United Kingdom (BPI)	3× Platinum	1,800,000^{‡}
United States (RIAA)	8× Platinum	8,000,000^{‡}
Streaming
Greece (IFPI Greece)	Platinum	2,000,000^{†}
Japan (RIAJ)	Gold	50,000,000^{†}
Sweden (GLF)	4× Platinum	32,000,000^{†}
^{‡} Sales+streaming figures based on certification alone.^{†} Streaming-only figures based on certification alone.

== Remix ==
"Mood (Remix)"

Single by 24kGoldn, Justin Bieber, J Balvin and Iann Dior
- Released: November 6, 2020
- Genre: Pop rap; rap rock
- Length: 3:12
- Label: Records; Columbia
- Songwriters: Golden Landis Von Jones; Justin Bieber; José Balvín; Michael Olmo; Blake Slatkin; Keegan Bach; Omer Fedi
- Producers: Omer Fedi; KBeaZy; Blake Slatkin

24kGoldn singles chronology
"I8 Roadsta" (2020)	"Mood (Remix)" / "I Admit It" (2020)	"Me Gusta (Remix)" (2020)

Justin Bieber singles chronology
"Lonely" (2020)	"Mood (Remix)" (2020)	"Monster" (2020)

J Balvin singles chronology
"Billetes Azules" (2020)	"Mood (Remix)" (2020)	"De Cora <3" (2020)

Iann Dior singles chronology
"Tonight" (2020)	"Mood" (2020)	"Holding On" (2020)

Lyric video
- "Mood (Remix)" on YouTube

An official remix of "Mood" was released on November 6, 2020, and featured vocals from Canadian singer Justin Bieber and Colombian singer J Balvin. Apart from verses by Bieber and Balvin, it also includes a new verse from 24kGoldn which replaces his verse on the original. An animated lyric video for the remix accompanied its release.

=== Reception ===
For Complex, Jordan Rose called Bieber and Balvin "perfect additions" to "Mood". Consequence's Wren Graves wrote, "[Bieber and Balvin] both sound like nobody else on the planet, and the contrast helps 24kGoldn shine."

=== Certifications ===
Certifications for "Mood (Remix)"
Region	Certification	Certified units/sales
Mexico (AMPROFON)	Gold	70,000^{‡}
^{‡} Sales+streaming figures based on certification alone.

== Release history ==
Release dates and formats for "Mood"
Region	Date	Format(s)	Version	Label	Ref.
Various	July 24, 2020	Digital download; streaming	Original	Columbia	
United States	September 8, 2020	Alternative radio	Original	Columbia	
United States	September 15, 2020	Rhythmic contemporary	Original	Columbia	
Italy	September 25, 2020	Radio airplay	Original	Sony	
United States	October 5, 2020	Hot adult contemporary	Original	Columbia	
Various	November 6, 2020	Digital download; streaming	Remix	Columbia	

== See also ==
- Billboard Year-End Hot 100 singles of 2020
- List of Airplay 100 number ones of the 2020s
- List of Billboard Adult Top 40 number-one songs of the 2020s
- List of Billboard Hot 100 number ones of 2020
- List of Billboard Hot 100 number ones of 2021
- List of Billboard Mainstream Top 40 number-one songs of 2020
- List of Billboard Rhythmic number-one songs of the 2020s
- List of Billboard Streaming Songs number ones of 2020
- List of Canadian Hot 100 number-one singles of 2020
- List of Canadian Hot 100 number-one singles of 2021
- List of number-one hits of 2020 (Austria)
- List of number-one hits of 2020 (Denmark)
- List of number-one hits of 2020 (Germany)
- List of number-one hits of 2020 (Switzerland)
- List of number-one R&B/hip-hop songs of 2020 (U.S.)
- List of number-one singles from the 2020s (New Zealand)
- List of number-one singles of 2020 (Australia)
- List of number-one singles of 2020 (Ireland)
- List of number-one singles of 2020 (Portugal)
- List of number-one singles of the 2020s (Sweden)
- List of number-one singles of 2021 (Australia)
- List of number-one songs in Norway
- List of number-one urban singles of 2020 (Australia)
- List of number-one urban singles of 2021 (Australia)
- List of Radio Songs number ones of the 2020s
- List of Rolling Stone Top 100 number-one songs of 2020
- List of UK R&B Singles Chart number ones of 2020
- List of UK Singles Chart number ones of the 2020s
