= List of number-one albums of 2020 (Canada) =

These are the Canadian number-one albums of 2020. The chart is compiled by Nielsen SoundScan and published in Billboard magazine as Top Canadian Albums.

== Number-one albums ==
Key
†	Indicates best-performing album of 2020

Issue date	Album	Artist(s)	Ref.
January 4	Christmas	Michael Bublé	
January 11	JackBoys	JackBoys	
January 18	Hollywood's Bleeding †	Post Malone	
January 25	Rare	Selena Gomez	
February 1	Music to Be Murdered By	Eminem	
February 8	Music to Be Murdered By	Eminem	
February 15	Music to Be Murdered By	Eminem	
February 22	Music to Be Murdered By	Eminem	
February 29	Changes	Justin Bieber	
March 7	Map of the Soul: 7	BTS	
March 14	American Standard	James Taylor	
March 21	Eternal Atake	Lil Uzi Vert	
March 28	Eternal Atake	Lil Uzi Vert	
April 4	After Hours	The Weeknd	
April 11	After Hours	The Weeknd	
April 18	After Hours	The Weeknd	
April 25	The New Toronto 3	Tory Lanez	
May 2	Blame It on Baby	DaBaby	
May 9	After Hours	The Weeknd	
May 16	Dark Lane Demo Tapes	Drake	
May 23	Good Intentions	Nav	
May 30	High Off Life	Future	
June 6	Wunna	Gunna	
June 13	Chromatica	Lady Gaga	
June 20	Chromatica	Lady Gaga	
June 27	Chromatica	Lady Gaga	
July 4	After Hours	The Weeknd	
July 11	After Hours	The Weeknd	
July 18	Shoot for the Stars, Aim for the Moon	Pop Smoke	
July 25	Legends Never Die	Juice Wrld	
August 1	Shoot for the Stars, Aim for the Moon	Pop Smoke	
August 8	Folklore	Taylor Swift	
August 15	Folklore	Taylor Swift	
August 22	Folklore	Taylor Swift	
August 29	Shoot for the Stars, Aim for the Moon	Pop Smoke	
September 5	Shoot for the Stars, Aim for the Moon	Pop Smoke	
September 12	Shoot for the Stars, Aim for the Moon	Pop Smoke	
September 19	Shoot for the Stars, Aim for the Moon	Pop Smoke	
September 26	Shoot for the Stars, Aim for the Moon	Pop Smoke	
October 3	Shoot for the Stars, Aim for the Moon	Pop Smoke	
October 10	Tickets to My Downfall	Machine Gun Kelly	
October 17	Savage Mode II	21 Savage and Metro Boomin	
October 24	Shoot for the Stars, Aim for the Moon	Pop Smoke	
October 31	Shoot for the Stars, Aim for the Moon	Pop Smoke	
November 7	What You See Is What You Get	Luke Combs	
November 14	Positions	Ariana Grande	
November 21	Positions	Ariana Grande	
November 28	Power Up	AC/DC	
December 5	Be	BTS	
December 12	Plastic Hearts	Miley Cyrus	
December 19	Wonder	Shawn Mendes	
December 26	Evermore	Taylor Swift	

== See also ==
- List of Canadian Hot 100 number-one singles of 2020
