= List of number-one singles of 2020 (Portugal) =

The Portuguese Singles Chart ranks the best-performing singles in Portugal, as compiled by the Associação Fonográfica Portuguesa.

Number-one singles of 2020 in Portugal
Week	Song	Artist	Reference
1	"Louco"	Piruka and Bluay	
2	"Louco"	Piruka and Bluay	
3	"Louco"	Piruka and Bluay	
4	"Louco"	Piruka and Bluay	
5	"Menina Solta"	Giulia Be	
6	"Menina Solta"	Giulia Be	
7	"Menina Solta"	Giulia Be	
8	"Menina Solta"	Giulia Be	
9	"Blinding Lights"	The Weeknd	
10	"La Bella Mafia"	Wet Bed Gang	
11	"Blinding Lights"	The Weeknd	
12	"Blinding Lights"	The Weeknd	
13	"Blinding Lights"	The Weeknd	
14	"Blinding Lights"	The Weeknd	
15	"Blinding Lights"	The Weeknd	
16	"Toosie Slide"	Drake	
17	"Toosie Slide"	Drake	
18	"The Scotts"	The Scotts (Travis Scott and Kid Cudi)	
19	"Toosie Slide"	Drake	
20	"Toosie Slide"	Drake	
21	"Toosie Slide"	Drake	
22	"Blinding Lights"	The Weeknd	
23	"Toosie Slide"	Drake	
24	"Breaking Me"	Topic and A7S	
25	"Breaking Me"	Topic and A7S	
26	"Breaking Me"	Topic and A7S	
27	"Rockstar"	DaBaby featuring Roddy Ricch	
28	"Rockstar"	DaBaby featuring Roddy Ricch	
29	"Rockstar"	DaBaby featuring Roddy Ricch	
30	"Rockstar"	DaBaby featuring Roddy Ricch	
31	"Rockstar"	DaBaby featuring Roddy Ricch	
32	"Rockstar"	DaBaby featuring Roddy Ricch	
33	"Rockstar"	DaBaby featuring Roddy Ricch	
34	"Watermelon Sugar"	Harry Styles	
35	"Mood Swings"	Pop Smoke featuring Lil Tjay	
36	"Mood Swings"	Pop Smoke featuring Lil Tjay	
37	"Mood Swings"	Pop Smoke featuring Lil Tjay	
38	"Melhor ou Pior"	Wuant	
39	"Mood"	24kGoldn featuring Iann Dior	
40	"Mood"	24kGoldn featuring Iann Dior	
41	"Lemonade"	Internet Money and Gunna featuring Don Toliver and Nav	
42	"Lemonade"	Internet Money and Gunna featuring Don Toliver and Nav	
43	"Lemonade"	Internet Money and Gunna featuring Don Toliver and Nav	
44	"São Paulo"	Yuri NR5	
45	"Lemonade"	Internet Money and Gunna featuring Don Toliver and Nav	
46	"São Paulo"	Yuri NR5	
47	"São Paulo"	Yuri NR5	
48	"São Paulo"	Yuri NR5	
49	"São Paulo"	Yuri NR5	
50	"São Paulo"	Yuri NR5	
51	"São Paulo"	Yuri NR5	
52	"All I Want for Christmas Is You"	Mariah Carey	
53	"São Paulo"	Yuri NR5	

== See also ==
- List of number-one albums of 2020 (Portugal)
