= List of Billboard Mainstream Top 40 number-one songs of 2020 =

This is a list of songs that reached number one on the Billboard Mainstream Top 40 (or Pop Songs) chart in 2020.

During 2020, a total of 15 singles hit number-one on the charts.

== Chart history ==
Key
†	Indicates best-performing song of 2020

Issue date	Song	Artist(s)	Ref.
January 4	"Circles"	Post Malone	
January 11	"Circles"	Post Malone	
January 18	"Circles"	Post Malone	
January 25	"Circles"	Post Malone	
February 1	"Circles"	Post Malone	
February 8	"Memories"	Maroon 5	
February 15	"Circles"	Post Malone	
February 22	"Circles"	Post Malone	
February 29	"Don't Start Now"	Dua Lipa	
March 7	"Don't Start Now"	Dua Lipa	
March 14	"Don't Start Now"	Dua Lipa	
March 21	"Don't Start Now"	Dua Lipa	
March 28	"Don't Start Now"	Dua Lipa	
April 4	"Don't Start Now"	Dua Lipa	
April 11	"Adore You"	Harry Styles	
April 18	"Blinding Lights" †	The Weeknd	
April 25	"Blinding Lights" †	The Weeknd	
May 2	"Blinding Lights" †	The Weeknd	
May 9	“My Oh My”	Camila Cabello featuring DaBaby	
May 16	"Say So"	Doja Cat	
May 23	"Say So"	Doja Cat	
May 30	"Say So"	Doja Cat	
June 6	"Say So"	Doja Cat	
June 13	"Say So"	Doja Cat	
June 20	"Say So"	Doja Cat	
June 27	"Intentions"	Justin Bieber featuring Quavo	
July 4	"Blinding Lights" †	The Weeknd	
July 11	"Blinding Lights" †	The Weeknd	
July 18	"Blinding Lights" †	The Weeknd	
July 25	"Falling"	Trevor Daniel	
August 1	"Break My Heart"	Dua Lipa	
August 8	"Watermelon Sugar"	Harry Styles	
August 15	"Watermelon Sugar"	Harry Styles	
August 22	"Watermelon Sugar"	Harry Styles	
August 29	"Watermelon Sugar"	Harry Styles	
September 5	"Watermelon Sugar"	Harry Styles	
September 12	"Watermelon Sugar"	Harry Styles	
September 19	"Watermelon Sugar"	Harry Styles	
September 26	"Before You Go"	Lewis Capaldi	
October 3	"Savage Love (Laxed – Siren Beat)"	Jawsh 685 and Jason Derulo	
October 10	"Savage Love (Laxed – Siren Beat)"	Jawsh 685 and Jason Derulo	
October 17	"Savage Love (Laxed – Siren Beat)"	Jawsh 685 and Jason Derulo	
October 24	"Savage Love (Laxed – Siren Beat)"	Jawsh 685 and Jason Derulo	
October 31	"Mood"	24kGoldn and Iann Dior	
November 7	"Mood"	24kGoldn and Iann Dior	
November 14	"Mood"	24kGoldn and Iann Dior	
November 21	"Mood"	24kGoldn and Iann Dior	
November 28	"Mood"	24kGoldn and Iann Dior	
December 5	"Mood"	24kGoldn and Iann Dior	
December 12	"Mood"	24kGoldn and Iann Dior	
December 19	"Mood"	24kGoldn and Iann Dior	
December 26	"Positions"	Ariana Grande	

== See also ==
- 2020 in American music
