= Toosie Slide =

2020 single by Drake

Single by Drake

from the album Dark Lane Demo Tapes
- Released: April 3, 2020
- Recorded: 2019–2020
- Genre: Trap
- Length: 4:07
- Label: OVO; Republic
- Songwriters: Aubrey Graham; Ozan Yildirim
- Producer: OZ

Drake singles chronology
"Oprah's Bank Account" (2020)	"Toosie Slide" (2020)	"Greece" (2020)

Music video
- "Toosie Slide" on YouTube

"Toosie Slide" is a song by Canadian rapper Drake from his commercial mixtape Dark Lane Demo Tapes (2020). Written alongside producer OZ, it was released as the lead single on April 3, 2020, through Republic and OVO. The song is titled after social media influencer, Toosie, who had previously helped the song go viral. A video was released alongside the song, showing Drake quarantined, due to the COVID-19 pandemic. He also demonstrates the Toosie Slide dance in his Toronto mansion. The song debuted at number eighteen on the US Bubbling Under Hot 100 before debuting at number one on the main Billboard Hot 100 chart the next week, making Drake the first male artist to accomplish three number-one debuts.

== Background and promotion ==
On March 29, 2020, social media influencer Toosie uploaded a clip showing him and his friends doing a dance challenge called the "Toosie Slide" while parts of the song are playing in the background. The dance was described as a "modern day 'Cha Cha Slide' by DJ Casper" and went viral after it was introduced to the app TikTok by Toosie, Hiii Key and Michigan duo Ayo & Teo. When it was subsequently shared on other social media pages, people considered possible involvement by Drake. He hinted at an impending release, saying "I'mma drop soon since ya'll got it going insane". Drake then took to his social media on March 31, 2020, to declare the song as his and revealed that it would be released the following Thursday at midnight, on Friday, April 3, 2020. American rapper Lil Baby revealed via Instagram that Drake wanted him on the song, calling himself a "dumbass" for not sending his verse back.

== Production ==
The song was produced by Turkish-Swiss producer Ozan Yildirim, professionally known as OZ, who previously collaborated with Travis Scott on 2018's "Sicko Mode", featuring Drake. In 2019, he again worked with Drake on the songs "Omertà" and "Gold Roses", the latter being a Rick Ross single, featuring Drake. Just prior to "Toosie Slide", OZ produced another Drake-featured track, Future's "Life Is Good". As with most of his productions, OZ makes extensive use of hi-hats and a snare drum on "Toosie Slide". The song also contains bass drum kicks paired with Drake's "melodic" chorus.

== Composition and lyrics ==
A trap song, "Toosie Slide" is a "seductive confection engineered to cause an Internet stir", containing "stuttering cymbals, a couple bass drum kicks" and "elliptical set of beats", leaving room for Drake's lyrics to take the spotlight, which he delivers with "melodic bars". Lyrically, Drake reflects on his "inner pressure", shouting out his friends, flirting with his many admirers and promising "a hot summer of music". He also gives dance directions for the song's titular dance, rapping "It go right foot up, left foot slide/Left foot up, right foot slide/Basically I'm saying, either way we 'bout to slide, aye". Drake makes numerous references to Michael Jackson throughout the song. Drake said, "When I first made that song, I was only talking about the moonwalk. But Toosie made a dance to that shit, I didn't know it was gonna be a dance song like that". The song has been compared to "Cupid Shuffle" by Cupid, the Electric Slide dance by Richard L. "Ric" Silver, and "Cha Cha Slide" by DJ Casper, which has similar dance instructions. Billboard called it the "'Cha Cha Slide' of the TikTok generation".

== Critical reception ==
"Toosie Slide" generally polarized critics. Alphonse Pierre of Pitchfork noted that despite Drake's ability of never needing "to chase a hit", for the first time it "feels like he's a step behind" and went on calling the track "strictly a business decision". Micah Peters of The Ringer was highly critical of the song as well as Drake's marketing ploys, comparing him to the DC Comics supervillain Darkseid. Peters further called producer OZ's production "airy, barely there", the hook "awkward syllabic balance" and said "Toosie Slide" feels marginal in the same way "God's Plan" did, "and doubtlessly, it'll also walk to no. 1". Ann Powers of NPR had a similar notion, labelling the song "a bit of trivial fun that will probably become an inescapable hit on the strength of its marketing and its catchy chorus". Conversely, Jason Lipshutz of Billboard named it among the most essential releases of the week, and said "Drake is smart to launch a self-fashioned dance craze in this era, but 'Toosie Slide' also showcases his skill of conjuring hooks and catchphrases out of thin air, which helped make him who he is today". Jessica McKinney of Complex also listed it as part of the "Best New Music of the Week", saying the song is not all gimmick and referenced the COVID-19 pandemic, stating "it is worth listening to when you're riding around in the car or heading out for a quick walk around the block. Maybe someday we'll actually get to hear it in a club".

== Commercial performance ==
The song debuted atop the US Billboard Hot 100 on the chart dated April 18, 2020, becoming his eighth number one single on the chart and making Drake the first male solo artist in US chart history to debut three songs at number one.

In the United Kingdom, "Toosie Slide" debuted at number two on the UK Singles Chart on April 10, 2020 – for the week ending date April 16, 2020 – behind "Blinding Lights" by The Weeknd. After five consecutive weeks in the top ten, "Toosie Slide" peaked at the top of the chart on May 8, 2020 – for the week ending date May 14, 2020 – dethroning "Times Like These" by Live Lounge Allstars from the top and beating "Say So" by Doja Cat to the top of the chart.

== Music video ==
The accompanying music video was released on April 3, 2020, at a length of 5 minutes and 12 seconds. It was directed by Theo Skudra. The visuals prominently feature Drake dancing around in his Toronto mansion, nicknamed "The Embassy", with a mask and gloves on while being in quarantine, due to the COVID-19 pandemic. He simultaneously demonstrates the song's titular dance. At the end, the rapper is seen outside of his home with a firework show on his property. The video also features a tribute to the late Kobe Bryant. The choreography in the video was created by Toosii, Hiii Key and Ayo & Teo who sent the footage to Drake. Originally, the dancers were supposed to appear in the video. However, plans were cancelled due to the COVID-19 pandemic.

=== Synopsis ===
The music video begins by showing quiet and almost deserted streets of the city, with no sign of cars, nor people moving around. The empty streets signify the quietness of the cities in the light of the lockdowns that have been enforced by governments globally to curb the spread of the COVID-19 virus among citizens. The video then shows Drake in an antechamber, showcasing his many awards sitting in trophy cases; through the door, a painting of China's Chairman Mao by Andy Warhol is seen hanging on the wall. Drake then passes by a table covered with the basketball jerseys he is usually seen wearing courtside, including one emblazoned with the name "Bryant", honoring the late American basketball star, Kobe Bryant, who had died earlier in the year from a helicopter crash, on January 26, 2020. The scene then cuts to a foyer, as the rapper passes two blinking "Four Foot Dissected Companion" sculptures by American artist and designer Kaws. The rapper is then seen sitting on "the biggest kitchen island [...]" and the camera pans toward the long dining room table. Drake continues moving through darkened rooms where portraits of "lost and distanced" heroes, including Prince, Nas, Tupac and Snoop Dogg, hang on the wall. He dances through a door to the pool area, which features "neon lighting and cabana-like décor". The video concludes with Drake in total darkness, "only his white sneakers visible against the eerily black Toronto sky". Fireworks erupt afterward, and the camera pans back to show the entirety of Drake's 35,000-square-foot, $100 million Toronto estate.

In the video, Drake is seen wearing a hoodie and a "super rare" Fall/Winter 2001 Raf Simons Riot Riot Riot Camo Bomber, an item Kanye West wore regularly during 2014 and 2015. A Bösendorfer piano is seen, which has a violet "Flowers and Skulls" print cover by Japanese artist Takashi Murakami. There is also a shot of what appears to be a recording contract, ready to be signed on Drake's dining-room table.

== TikTok dance challenge ==
Over 4.5 million videos have been made on TikTok using the song, with a combined 7.6 billion views as of July 2021. These videos usually consist of users dancing to a snippet of the song. The hashtag #toosieslide garnered over 5.7 billion views. It was the fourth biggest TikTok song for April 2020. The song peaked on April 20, 2020, garnering over 250 million views on videos made to the song that day.

== Credits and personnel ==
Credits adapted from Tidal.

- Aubrey Graham – vocals, songwriter
- Ozan Yildirim – songwriter, production
- Noah "40" Shebib – mixer
- Noel Cadastre – assistant mixer, recording engineer
- Chris Athens – mastering engineer

== Charts ==
=== Weekly charts ===
Chart (2020)	Peak position
Australia (ARIA)	3
Austria (Ö3 Austria Top 40)	2
Belgium (Ultratop 50 Flanders)	6
Belgium (Ultratop 50 Wallonia)	7
Canada Hot 100 (Billboard)	2
Canada CHR/Top 40 (Billboard)	5
Canada Hot AC (Billboard)	21
Czech Republic Singles Digital (ČNS IFPI)	5
Denmark (Tracklisten)	1
Estonia (Eesti Tipp-40)	2
Euro Digital Song Sales (Billboard)	10
Finland (Suomen virallinen lista)	4
France (SNEP)	4
Germany (GfK)	2
Global 200 (Billboard)	73
Greece (IFPI)	1
Hungary (Single Top 40)	9
Hungary (Stream Top 40)	3
Iceland (Tónlistinn)	9
Ireland (IRMA)	1
Israel International Airplay (Media Forest)	9
Italy (FIMI)	7
Lithuania (AGATA)	2
Malaysia (RIM)	2
Mexico Airplay (Billboard)	26
Netherlands (Dutch Top 40)	16
Netherlands (Single Top 100)	2
New Zealand (Recorded Music NZ)	1
Norway (VG-lista)	4
Portugal (AFP)	1
Romania (Airplay 100)	43
Scottish Singles Sales (Official Charts)	13
Singapore (RIAS)	1
Slovakia Singles Digital (ČNS IFPI)	5
Spain (PROMUSICAE)	39
Sweden (Sverigetopplistan)	3
Switzerland (Schweizer Hitparade)	2
UK Singles (Official Charts)	1
US Billboard Hot 100	1
US Dance Airplay (Billboard)	25
US Hot R&B/Hip-Hop Songs (Billboard)	1
US Pop Airplay (Billboard)	10
US Rhythmic Airplay (Billboard)	1
US Rolling Stone Top 100	1

=== Monthly charts ===
Chart (2020)	Peak position
Brazil (Pro-Música Brasil)	38

=== Year-end charts ===
Chart (2020)	Position
Australia (ARIA)	37
Austria (Ö3 Austria Top 40)	39
Belgium (Ultratop Flanders)	59
Belgium (Ultratop Wallonia)	40
Canada (Canadian Hot 100)	32
Denmark (Tracklisten)	44
France (SNEP)	65
Germany (Official German Charts)	37
Hungary (Single Top 40)	99
Hungary (Stream Top 40)	35
Ireland (IRMA)	29
Netherlands (Single Top 100)	51
New Zealand (Recorded Music NZ)	49
Sweden (Sverigetopplistan)	51
Switzerland (Schweizer Hitparade)	33
UK Singles (OCC)	25
US Billboard Hot 100	32
US Hot R&B/Hip-Hop Songs (Billboard)	12
US Mainstream Top 40 (Billboard)	49
US Rhythmic (Billboard)	16

Chart (2021)	Position
Portugal (AFP)	197

== Certifications ==
Region	Certification	Certified units/sales
Australia (ARIA)	4× Platinum	280,000^{‡}
Austria (IFPI Austria)	Gold	15,000^{‡}
Belgium (BRMA)	Platinum	40,000^{‡}
Brazil (Pro-Música Brasil)	2× Diamond	320,000^{‡}
Canada (Music Canada)	4× Platinum	320,000^{‡}
Denmark (IFPI Danmark)	Platinum	90,000^{‡}
France (SNEP)	Platinum	200,000^{‡}
Germany (BVMI)	Gold	200,000^{‡}
Italy (FIMI)	Platinum	70,000^{‡}
New Zealand (RMNZ)	2× Platinum	60,000^{‡}
Poland (ZPAV)	Platinum	20,000^{‡}
Portugal (AFP)	3× Platinum	30,000^{‡}
Spain (Promusicae)	Gold	30,000^{‡}
United Kingdom (BPI)	Platinum	600,000^{‡}
Streaming
Greece (IFPI Greece)	Platinum	2,000,000^{†}
^{‡} Sales+streaming figures based on certification alone.^{†} Streaming-only figures based on certification alone.

== Release history ==
Country	Date	Format	Label	Ref.
Various	April 3, 2020	Digital download; streaming	Republic; OVO	
United States	April 7, 2020	Contemporary hit radio	Cash Money; Young Money; Republic	
Italy	April 8, 2020	Radio airplay	Universal	

== See also ==
- "Nonstop", a 2018 song by Drake which also went viral on TikTok in 2018 and again in 2020
- List of number-one hits of 2020 (Denmark)
- List of number-one singles from the 2020s (New Zealand)
- List of number-one singles of 2020 (Portugal)
- List of number-one songs of 2020 (Singapore)
- List of Billboard Hot 100 number-one singles of 2020
- List of Billboard Hot 100 top-ten singles in 2020
- List of number-one Billboard Streaming Songs of 2020
