= List of Canadian Hot 100 number-one singles of 2020 =

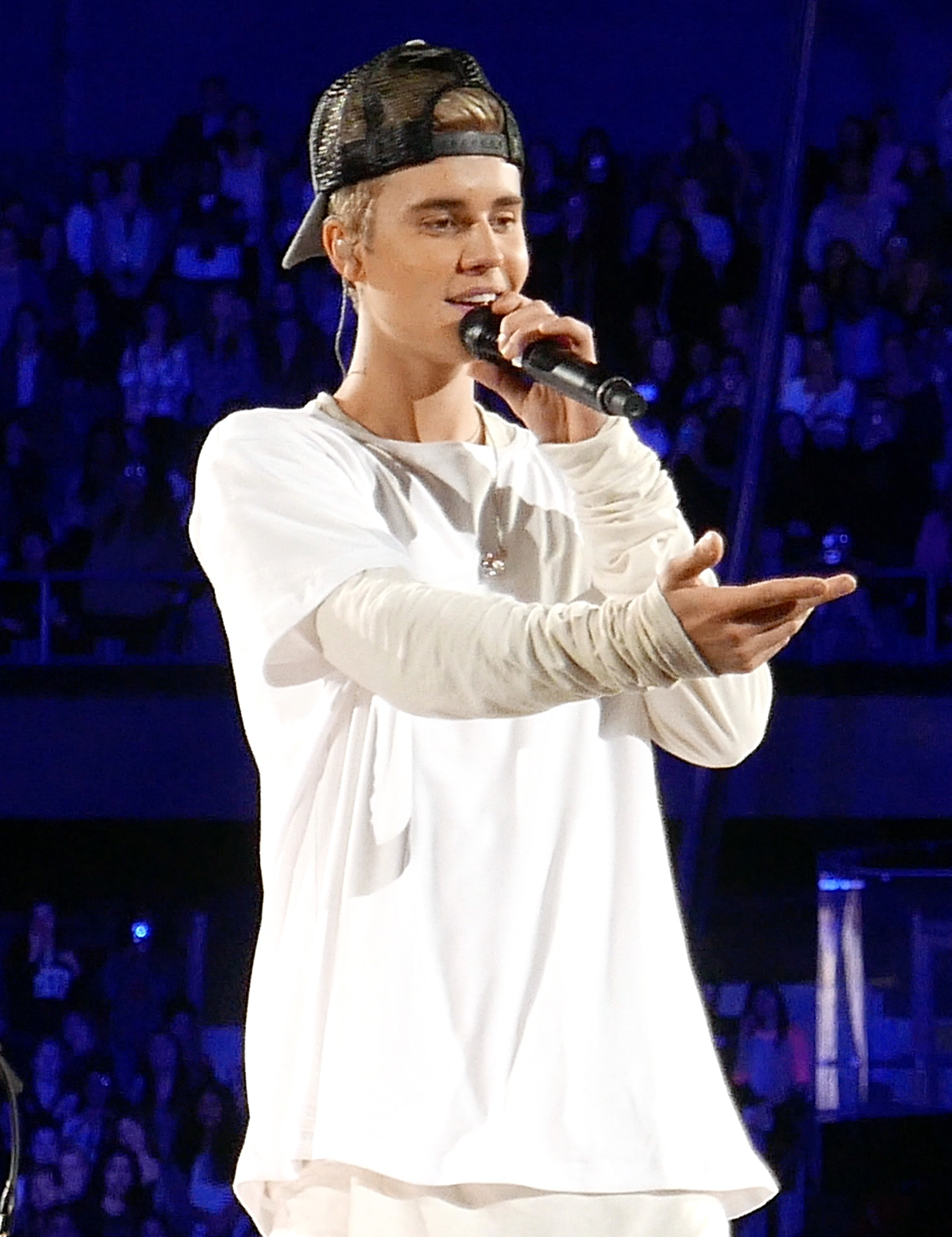
Justin Bieber (pictured) earned the most number-one singles of the year with four, as "Stuck with U", "Holy", "Lonely", and "Monster" hit number one on the chart.

This is a list of the Canadian Hot 100 number-one singles of 2020. The Canadian Hot 100 is a chart that ranks the best-performing singles of Canada. Its data, published by Billboard magazine and compiled by MRC Data, is based collectively on each single's weekly physical and digital sales, as well as airplay and streaming.

== Chart history ==
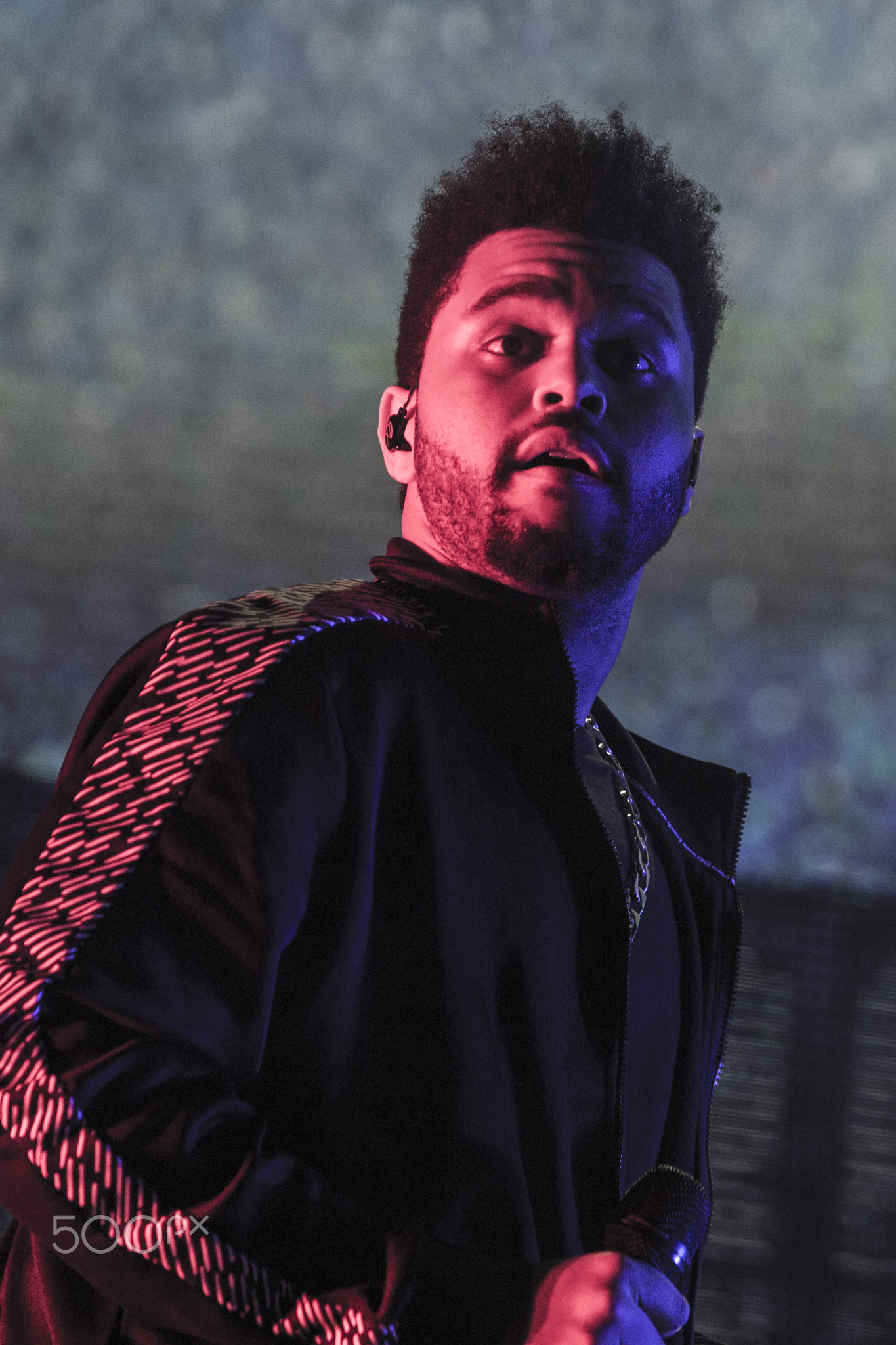
The Weeknd (pictured) spent seven weeks at number one with his single "Blinding Lights".

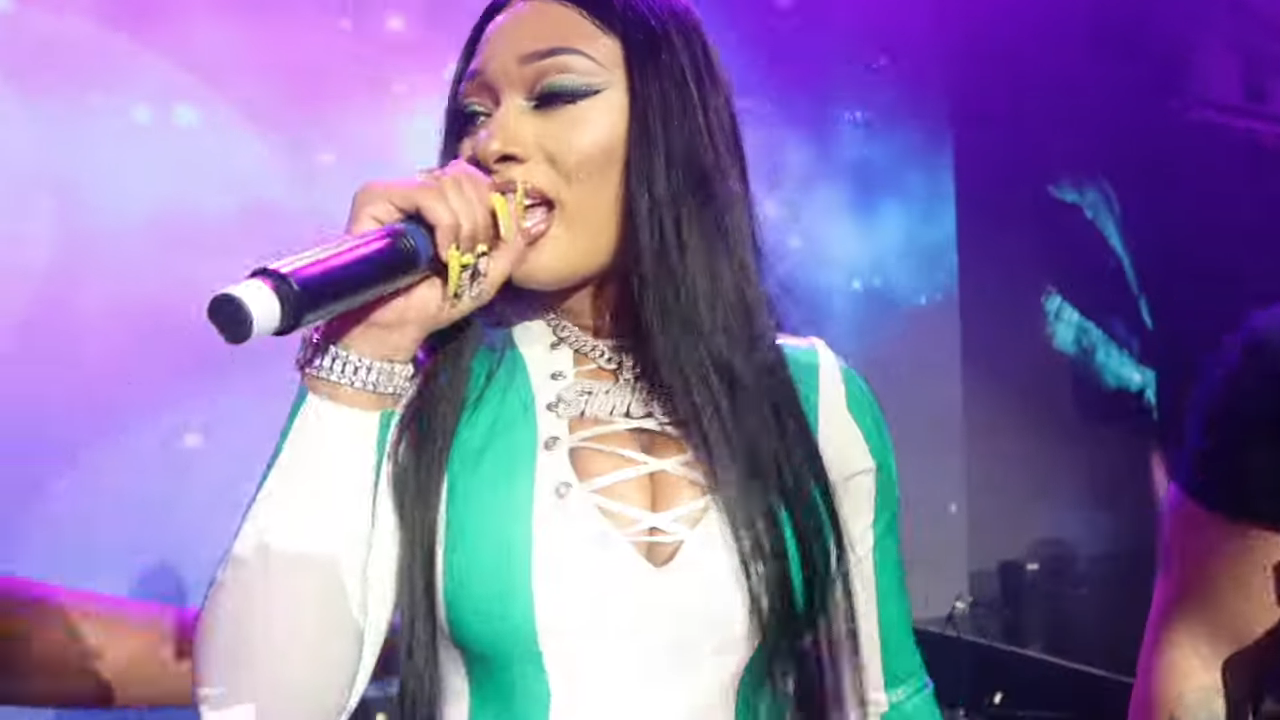
Megan Thee Stallion (pictured) scored her first number-one single, "WAP", with Cardi B. It is also the first female rap collaboration to reach number one on the Billboard Canadian Hot 100.

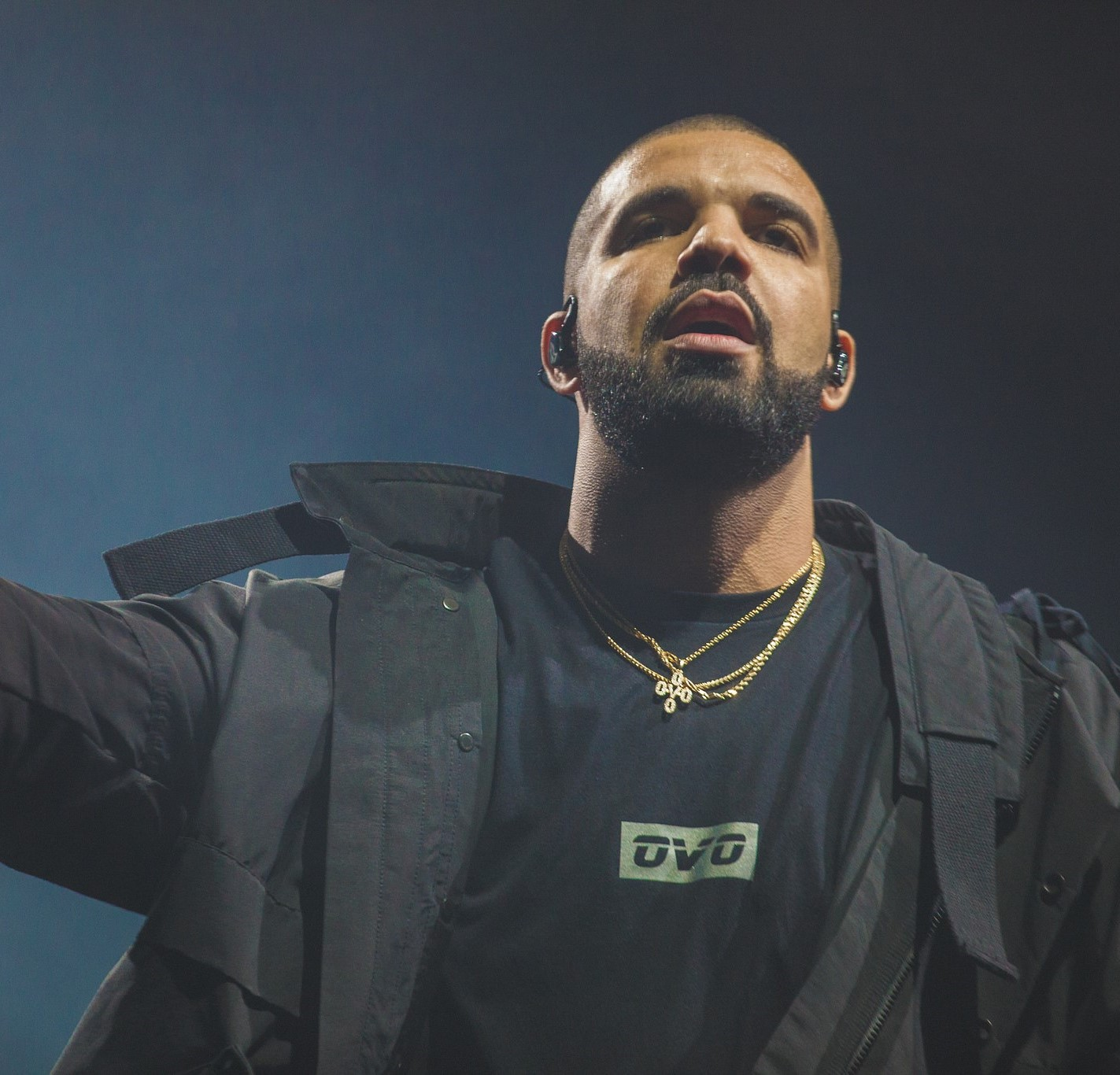
Drake (pictured) earned two number-one singles this year, "Popstar" with DJ Khaled and "Laugh Now Cry Later" with Lil Durk.

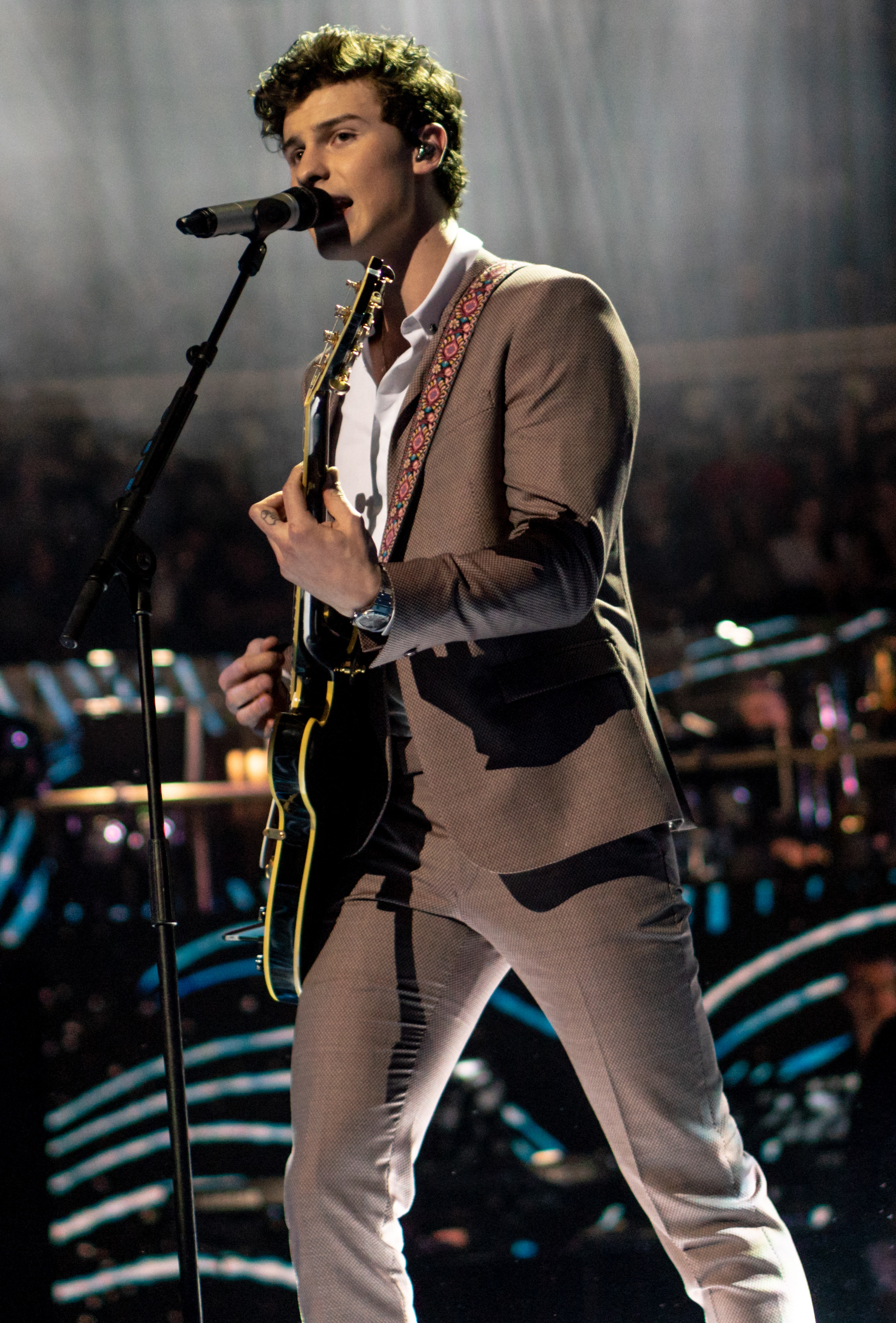
Shawn Mendes (pictured) scored his second number-one single, "Monster", with Justin Bieber, making it the first all-Canadian collaboration to go to number one on the chart.

Key
†	Indicates best-performing single of 2020

No.	Issue date	Song	Artist(s)	Ref.
re	January 4	"All I Want for Christmas Is You"	Mariah Carey	
re	January 11	"Dance Monkey" †	Tones and I	
re	January 18	"Dance Monkey" †	Tones and I	
147	January 25	"The Box"	Roddy Ricch	
147	February 1	"The Box"	Roddy Ricch	
147	February 8	"The Box"	Roddy Ricch	
147	February 15	"The Box"	Roddy Ricch	
147	February 22	"The Box"	Roddy Ricch	
147	February 29	"The Box"	Roddy Ricch	
147	March 7	"The Box"	Roddy Ricch	
147	March 14	"The Box"	Roddy Ricch	
147	March 21	"The Box"	Roddy Ricch	
147	March 28	"The Box"	Roddy Ricch	
148	April 4	"Blinding Lights"	The Weeknd	
148	April 11	"Blinding Lights"	The Weeknd	
148	April 18	"Blinding Lights"	The Weeknd	
148	April 25	"Blinding Lights"	The Weeknd	
148	May 2	"Blinding Lights"	The Weeknd	
149	May 9	"The Scotts"	The Scotts (Travis Scott and Kid Cudi)	
re	May 16	"Blinding Lights"	The Weeknd	
150	May 23	"Stuck with U"	Ariana Grande and Justin Bieber	
re	May 30	"Blinding Lights"	The Weeknd	
151	June 6	"Rain on Me"	Lady Gaga and Ariana Grande	
152	June 13	"Roses"	Saint Jhn	
152	June 20	"Roses"	Saint Jhn	
152	June 27	"Roses"	Saint Jhn	
152	July 4	"Roses"	Saint Jhn	
152	July 11	"Roses"	Saint Jhn	
153	July 18	"Rockstar"	DaBaby featuring Roddy Ricch	
re	July 25	"Roses"	Saint Jhn	
154	August 1	"Popstar"	DJ Khaled featuring Drake	
re	August 8	"Roses"	Saint Jhn	
155	August 15	"Savage Love (Laxed – Siren Beat)"	Jawsh 685 and Jason Derulo	
156	August 22	"WAP"	Cardi B featuring Megan Thee Stallion	
157	August 29	"Laugh Now Cry Later"	Drake featuring Lil Durk	
re	September 5	"WAP"	Cardi B featuring Megan Thee Stallion	
re	September 12	"WAP"	Cardi B featuring Megan Thee Stallion	
re	September 19	"WAP"	Cardi B featuring Megan Thee Stallion	
158	September 26	"Mood"	24kGoldn featuring Iann Dior	
159	October 3	"Holy"	Justin Bieber featuring Chance the Rapper	
re	October 10	"Mood"	24kGoldn featuring Iann Dior	
re	October 17	"Mood"	24kGoldn featuring Iann Dior	
re	October 24	"Mood"	24kGoldn featuring Iann Dior	
160	October 31	"Lonely"	Justin Bieber and Benny Blanco	
161	November 7	"Positions"	Ariana Grande	
re	November 14	"Mood"	24kGoldn featuring Iann Dior	
re	November 21	"Mood"	24kGoldn featuring Iann Dior	
re	November 28	"Mood"	24kGoldn featuring Iann Dior	
162	December 5	"Monster"	Shawn Mendes and Justin Bieber	
re	December 12	"Mood"	24kGoldn featuring Iann Dior	
re	December 19	"Mood"	24kGoldn featuring Iann Dior	
163	December 26	"Willow"	Taylor Swift	

== See also ==
- List of number-one albums of 2020 (Canada)
