= Blinding Lights =

2019 single by the Weeknd

Single by the Weeknd

from the album After Hours
- Released: November 29, 2019
- Recorded: February 2019
- Studio: MXM (Los Angeles, California); Jungle City (New York City)
- Genre: Synth-pop; electropop; dance-pop; new wave; synthwave
- Length: 3:22
- Label: XO; Republic
- Songwriters: Abel Tesfaye; Ahmad Balshe; Jason Quenneville; Max Martin; Oscar Holter
- Producers: Max Martin; Oscar Holter; The Weeknd

The Weeknd singles chronology
| "Heartless" (2019) | "Blinding Lights" (2019) | "After Hours" (2020) |

Music video
- "Blinding Lights" on YouTube

"Blinding Lights" is a song by Canadian singer-songwriter the Weeknd, from his fourth studio album, After Hours (2020). The song was released through XO and Republic Records on November 29, 2019, as the album's second single. It is a synth-pop, electropop, dance-pop, new wave, and synthwave track, which lyrically addresses the importance of a partner, and the desire to see them at night. It was written by the Weeknd, Max Martin, Oscar Holter, Belly, and DaHeala, while being produced by the former three.

"Blinding Lights" received universal acclaim by music journalists upon release, with many noting its aesthetic, as well as its callback to the music of the 1980s. The song was a commercial success, topping the record charts in over 40 countries, including his native Canada, making it his most successful single to date. In the United States, "Blinding Lights" topped the Billboard Hot 100 for four non-consecutive weeks, earning his fifth number one in the country. It became the song with the most weeks spent in the top five and top ten and the first song to hold a spot in the top ten for an entire year.

It was the longest-charting song in history on the Hot 100 for a short period of time, remaining on it for a total of 90 weeks, and was named as the chart's best-performing song of all time on November 23, 2021. It was certified diamond by the Recording Industry Association of America (RIAA) and seven times platinum by the British Phonographic Industry (BPI). According to the International Federation of the Phonographic Industry, it was the best-selling global single of 2020 and the best-selling song overall since 2020 by stream equivalent units. On Spotify, it is the most streamed song of all time, and the first song to surpass four and five billion streams.

Anton Tammi directed the song's music video, which was filmed over a four-day period shot in the night. Inspired by films such as Fear and Loathing in Las Vegas (1998), Joker (2019), and Casino (1995), it depicts the Weeknd speeding through a city, after getting beaten by bouncers and being forced on the run. "Blinding Lights" was performed on television shows such as The Late Show with Stephen Colbert, Jimmy Kimmel Live!, Saturday Night Live, his headlining set at the Super Bowl LV halftime show, and was included on the set list for his After Hours til Dawn Tour. It received several awards and nominations, winning Song of the Year at the 2021 iHeartRadio Music Awards and Juno Awards of 2021.

== Background and development ==
In November 2018, the Weeknd announced at a concert that he was working on his fourth studio album, tentatively referred to as "Chapter VI".

After a five-month social media hiatus, the singer-songwriter returned to Instagram on November 20, 2019, and posted six days later on November 26, 2019. He previously announced a project referred to as Chapter VI in June 2019. On November 24, 2019, a Mercedes-Benz commercial first aired on German TV featuring a clip of "Blinding Lights". It shows the Weeknd driving a Mercedes-Benz EQC SUV and asking the system to play his new song. The full-length version of the commercial premiered on November 29, alongside the single. In the days after, he took to social media to announce his return to music with the captions "the fall starts tomorrow night" and "Tonight we start a new brain melting psychotic chapter! Let's go!"

During an interview conducted by Jem Aswad from Variety magazine, the Weeknd discussed his experience working with Swedish songwriter-producer Max Martin, saying: "Max and I have become literally the best of friends, but I don't do that with many people. It's not that I can't, but a collaboration is a relationship, it's like a marriage, you've gotta build up to it." In a Billboard interview, the Weeknd expressed his appreciation for music of the 1980s: "I've always had an admiration for the era before I was born. You can hear it as far back as my first mixtape that the '80s — Siouxsie and the Banshees, Cocteau Twins — play such a huge role in my sound. Sometimes it helps me create a new sound and sometimes it's just obvious. I'm just glad the world's into it now." In an interview with Vanity Fair, the Weeknd said that he initially thought that the song would be a commercial failure.

== Lyrics and composition ==
Throughout the song, the Weeknd sings about the rekindling of a relationship and the importance of his partner. He also mentions the city of Las Vegas, Nevada, when he refers to it by its nickname "Sin City" in the pre-chorus. In a profile in Esquire magazine, The Weeknd explained that "'Blinding Lights' [is about] how you want to see someone at night, and you're intoxicated, and you're driving to this person and you're just blinded by streetlights, but nothing could stop you from trying to go see that person, because you're so lonely. I don't want to ever promote drunk driving, but that's what the dark undertone is."

From its scale-laddering verses to its tension-filled chorus, the song exhibits the polish and "melodic math" for which Max Martin is renowned, according to Chris Molanphy from Slate. The Dorian structure provides a dreamy and euphoric nature to the song while still ultimately resolving to a minor chord. Exclusively in the music video, the song temporarily modulates to D Dorian as the beats per minute drops for 3 and a half measures.

Billboard staff writer Frank DiGiacomo assessed its qualities, "The opening drumbeat is a DeLorean [time machine] back to Michael Jackson's 'Beat It'. The amphetamine synth conjures fond memories of leopard-print-era Rod Stewart's 'Young Turks' — or maybe that other guy with the avian hairdo, Mike Score from A Flock of Seagulls? And isn't that spooky B-movie organ from Rockwell's 'Somebody's Watching Me'? Abel Tesfaye's Drambuie-drenched vocals bathe you in euphoria as you bop around your home in an N-95 mask, punching your fist to the 'Hey!-Hey!-Hey!''s, making a magical and much-needed tonic for troubled times".

The genre of the song is generally described as new wave, synth-pop, synthwave and electropop. Audio engineer Şerban Ghenea says he loved working on the Weeknd's crisp-sounding "Blinding Lights". "It was crossing two worlds to make something new that fits today, sonically. The older folks like it because it's a throwback, and then the kids love it because it's a new thing that they never heard before."

== Critical reception ==
"Blinding Lights" received universal acclaim from critics. It was named as the second best song of 2020 by Billboard and the best song of 2020 by Consequence of Sound; the former highlighted its nostalgic appeal, and the latter praised its "melodic romance waxed over a blockbuster riff". Variety magazine named "Blinding Lights" the Record of the Year: "The Weeknd's 'Blinding Lights' is indisputably one of the landmark songs of 2020. The piece has a crystalline synth hook straight out of 1985. The record has come to symbolize strength and triumphing over adversity." "Blinding Lights" was named one of the best songs of 2019 by Stereogum, where editor Chris DeVille complimented the song's '80s aesthetic and vibe, saying that "the '80s will never die—or, at least, the glamorous neon '80s of our collective imagination".

Rolling Stone columnist Kory Grow named "Blinding Lights" as the fourth best song of 2020: "With fuzzy synths and hopscotching drum-machine line, 'Blinding Lights' is the best new wave song this side of Duran Duran. In just three minutes, the Weeknd checks off any number of Eighties pop-song signposts—unanswered phone calls, driving fast just to feel something, lights representing loneliness—but the real magic is how his voice and the song's chiming keyboard line lingers in your head well after he injects new life into the greatest Eighties-steeped lyrical cliché of them all: 'I can't sleep until I feel your touch,'" and editor Jon Dolan praised the "europhile synth-pop-steeped" production, "Blinding Lights" evokes Depeche Mode and the Human League in its lonely-planet luster. David Smyth of Evening Standard also praised the song, calling it a "glorious blast of air punching Eighties synth-pop". Micah Peters from The Ringer selected it as one of the best on the album. The New York Times journalist Lindsay Zoladz named "Blinding Lights" one of the best songs of 2020: "It's a propulsive, modernized bit of '80s pastiche. It's always a blessing when the year's most overplayed pop song happens to be one you wouldn't mind hearing a billion and one times anyway," and editor Jon Caramanica added that "'Blinding Lights' is a sterling song that evokes both an idyllic future and triggers aural sense memories of mega-pop's glory years. 'Blinding Lights' could have been lifted from a found Jazzercise tape from 1986, though the chilly synths have a slightly sinister tinge [and] says a lot about the durability of the Weeknd's early noir—the full commitment to the louche aesthetic he embodied—that even the raging centrist popularity of 'Blinding Lights' can't disinter it."

Ben Beaumont-Thomas of The Guardian named "Blinding Lights" one of the best songs of 2020: "It's a titanic pop production from backroom genius Max Martin, who seems to pay homage to his fellow Scandinavians a-ha with the peppy gated drums. Abel Tesfaye himself shows he can slip between genres casually as he does the lovers in his songs, notching up another wedding disco classic." When describing the Weeknd's ode to '80s music, Nick Levine of BBC News named "Blinding Lights" one of the best songs of 2020: "Co-written and co-produced with Swedish songwriting genius Max Martin, its synth-pop shimmer manages to feel retro and contemporary at the same time—a tricky thing to pull off. Still, the key to its enduring popularity could lie in its ambiguity. Though 'Blinding Lights'' explosive chorus is one of the year's most familiar and uplifting, there's a dash of darkness baked in that keeps things interesting." Editor Makael Wood from Los Angeles Times named "Blinding Lights" one of the best songs of 2020: "The Weeknd's throwback synth-pop smash was so ubiquitous this year that you couldn't avoid hearing it even when you weren't going anywhere. One aspect that kept it from wearing out its welcome: a crisp tempo just a few ticks faster than you're always expecting."

In 2022, Computer Music wrote, "The Weeknd's 'Blinding Lights' is probably the most high-profile synth pop tune of the last couple of years, having been number one the world over and shifting as many copies as any synth song. It wears its 80s roots well – those riffs could have come from any a-ha or OMD single – and proves that electronic music, in its purest form, is alive, well and as popular as ever."

=== Year-end and other lists ===
| Publication | List | Rank | Ref. |
|---|---|---|---|
| BBC News | The 7 Best Songs of 2020 | Placed | |
| Billboard | The 100 Best Songs of 2020 | 2 | |
| Billboard | The 30 Best Pop Songs of 2020 | Placed | |
| Billboard | The Top Songs of All Time | 1 | |
| Consequence of Sound | The Top 50 Songs of 2020 | 1 | |
| Entertainment.ie | The 10 Best Songs of 2020 | 7 | |
| Gaffa | The 20 Best Songs of 2020 | 1 | |
| The Guardian | The 20 Best Songs of 2020 | 6 | |
| The Houston Press | The Top 20 Songs of 2020 | 3 | |
| Los Angeles Times | The 50 Best Songs of 2020 | Placed | |
| The New York Times | Lindsay Zoladz's Best Songs of 2020 | 7 | |
| Pitchfork | The 100 Best Songs of 2020 | 23 | |
| Rolling Stone | The 50 Best Songs of 2020 | 4 | |
| Spin | The 30 Best Songs of 2020 | 6 | |
| Uproxx | The 50 Best Songs of 2020 | 37 | |
| Uproxx | Music Critics Poll: The Best Songs of The Year | 3 | |
| USA Today | The 10 Best Songs of 2020 | 5 | |

== Grammys controversy ==
Despite having a successful year in 2020 with the critical and commercial success of "Blinding Lights" and its parent album, the Weeknd received zero nominations at the 63rd Annual Grammy Awards on November 24, 2020. The gesture spawned much controversy and was a shock to critics, fans, and Tesfaye himself. He responded via social media calling the Grammys "corrupt" in popular social media posts. Speculation arose that the announcement of his upcoming Super Bowl performance, as well as the confusion as to whether he should be nominated as pop or R&B, contributed to the snubs in all the categories that he was submitted to. Harvey Mason Jr., interim president of the Recording Academy, responded to the backlash by saying:

We understand that The Weeknd is disappointed at not being nominated. I was surprised and can empathize with what he's feeling. His music this year was excellent, and his contributions to the music community and broader world are worthy of everyone's admiration. We were thrilled when we found out he would be performing at the upcoming Super Bowl and we would have loved to have him also perform on the Grammy stage the weekend before. Unfortunately, every year, there are fewer nominations than the number of deserving artists. But as the only peer-voted music award, we will continue to recognize and celebrate excellence in music while shining a light on the many amazing artists that make up our global community. To be clear, voting in all categories ended well before The Weeknd's performance at the Super Bowl was announced, so in no way could it have affected the nomination process. All Grammy nominees are recognized by the voting body for their excellence, and we congratulate them all.

The Weeknd later made a statement addressing the infamous snub in January 2021, where he said that it felt like "an attack", saying "Look, I personally don't care anymore. I have three GRAMMYs, which mean nothing to me now, obviously...It's not like, 'Oh, I want the GRAMMY!' It's just that this happened, and I'm down to get in front of the fire, as long as it never happens again. I suck at giving speeches anyways. Forget awards shows."

== Accolades ==
Awards and nominations for "Blinding Lights"
| Year | Awards | Category | Result | Ref. |
|---|---|---|---|---|
| 2020 | American Music Awards | Favorite Music Video | Nominated | |
| 2020 | American Music Awards | Favorite Song – Pop/Rock | Nominated | |
| 2020 | Camerimage International Film Festival | Best Music Video | Nominated | |
| 2020 | Camerimage International Film Festival | Best Cinematography in Music Video | Nominated | |
| 2020 | Danish Music Awards | International Hit of the Year | Won | |
| 2020 | LOS40 Music Awards | Best International Song | Nominated | |
| 2020 | LOS40 Music Awards | Best International Video | Won | |
| 2020 | MTV Europe Music Awards | Best Song | Nominated | |
| 2020 | MTV Europe Music Awards | Best Video | Nominated | |
| 2020 | MTV Millennial Awards Brasil | Global Hit | Nominated | |
| 2020 | MTV Video Music Awards | Video of the Year | Won | |
| 2020 | MTV Video Music Awards | Best Cinematography | Nominated | |
| 2020 | MTV Video Music Awards | Best Direction | Nominated | |
| 2020 | MTV Video Music Awards | Best Editing | Nominated | |
| 2020 | MTV Video Music Awards | Best R&B | Won | |
| 2020 | MTV Video Music Awards | Song of Summer | Nominated | |
| 2020 | MTV Video Music Awards Japan | Best Male Video – International | Won | |
| 2020 | NRJ Music Award | International Song of the Year | Nominated | |
| 2020 | NRJ Music Award | Video of the Year | Nominated | |
| 2020 | E! People's Choice Awards | Music Video of the Year | Nominated | |
| 2020 | Rockbjörnen | International Song of the Year | Nominated | |
| 2020 | UK Music Video Awards (Note: Director Anton Tammi and production company Somesuch also won awards for Best Direction and Best Production Company, respectively, for their works on the After Hours videos.) | Best Pop Video – International | Won | |
| 2020 | UK Music Video Awards | Best Cinematography in a Video | Nominated | |
| 2020 | UK Music Video Awards | Best Colour Grading in a Video | Nominated | |
| 2020 | UK Music Video Awards | Best Live Video | Nominated | |
| 2020 | Variety's Hitmakers | Record of the Year | Won | |
| 2021 | ASCAP Pop Music Awards | Award Winning Songs | Won | |
| 2021 | Billboard Music Awards | Top Hot 100 Song | Won | |
| 2021 | Billboard Music Awards | Top Radio Song | Won | |
| 2021 | Billboard Music Awards | Top R&B Song | Won | |
| 2021 | Billboard Music Awards | Top Selling Song | Nominated | |
| 2021 | Billboard Music Awards | Top Streaming Song | Nominated | |
| 2021 | GAFFA Awards (Denmark) | International Hit of the Year | Nominated | |
| 2021 | GAFFA Awards (Sweden) | International Song of the Year | Won | |
| 2021 | iHeartRadio Music Awards | Song of the Year | Won | |
| 2021 | iHeartRadio Music Awards | Titanium Song of the Year | Won | |
| 2021 | iHeartRadio Music Awards | Best Music Video | Nominated | |
| 2021 | iHeartRadio Music Awards | Best Lyrics | Nominated | |
| 2021 | iHeartRadio Music Awards | TikTok Bop of the Year | Won | |
| 2021 | Juno Awards | Single of the Year | Won | |
| 2021 | Kids' Choice Awards | Best Song | Nominated | |
| 2021 | SOCAN Awards | Pop Music Award | Won | |
| 2021 | SOCAN Awards | International Song Award | Won | |
| 2021 | Swiss Music Awards | Best International Hit | Won | |
| 2021 | TEC Awards | Outstanding Creative Achievement – Record Production/Single or Track | Nominated | |

== Commercial performance ==
=== North America ===
"Blinding Lights" debuted at number 11 on the Billboard Hot 100 on the issue dated December 14, 2019, but fell 41 places to number 52 in its second week. In its 12th week on the chart, the song became the Weeknd's tenth top ten hit by rising to a new peak at number ten. On the issue dated March 28, 2020, the song rose two places to reach number two. The song reached number one on R&B/Hip-Hop Songs on April 4, 2020, leading for 11 non-consecutive weeks. The song also reached number one on R&B Songs chart on March 7, 2020, where it became his seventh number one on the chart, making him the artist with the most number ones on the chart's history and also attaining a record-breaking reign of 48 weeks. On March 30, 2020, the song rose to number one on the Billboard Hot 100, dethroning Roddy Ricch's "The Box" on the issue dated April 4, 2020. The single kept at its peak position the following week, becoming the Weeknd's third multi-week leader after "The Hills", which topped the chart five years earlier. "Blinding Lights" spent four weeks atop the Hot 100 and finished 2020 as the year's top Billboard Hot 100 song. The following year, it ranked at number three on the year-end chart, becoming the first single to finish in the top three on two occasions.

"Blinding Lights" spent 57 weeks in the top ten of the Billboard Hot 100 and 43 weeks in the top five, breaking the record for the most time logged in the region over the chart's 62-year history. On the Digital Song Sales chart, the song peaked at number one for the week of March 23, 2020, and became the Weeknd's fifth Digital Songs number one. The single reached a peak of number one on the Streaming Songs chart on March 30, becoming his first topper on the listing since "The Hills" led five years earlier. On April 13, the song reached number one on Pop Songs chart, where it led for 6 non-consecutive weeks, as it slid to number two on the Hot 100. It later rose back up to number one for the two following weeks. On May 18, the song became his first number one on the Adult Pop Songs chart, leading for 20 non-consecutive weeks. On November 7, "Blinding Lights" became his first number one on the Adult Contemporary chart, where it led for 35 non-consecutive weeks. "Blinding Lights" topped Radio Songs for a record-breaking 26 weeks, passing Goo Goo Dolls' "Iris", which held the record as the longest-running chart-topper for almost 22 years. "Blinding Lights" fell out of the Hot 100 for the week dated January 2, 2021, but it re-entered at number 3 the next week, breaking the three-way tie for the highest song to re-enter the Hot 100. Meanwhile, "Blinding Lights" tied for the most time totaled in the Hot 100's top three, 21 weeks, equaling the sums of The Chainsmokers' "Closer" and Mark Ronson's "Uptown Funk!".

For a short time during 2022, "Blinding Lights" was the longest running single in the history of the Hot 100 chart with a total of 90 weeks, surpassing Imagine Dragons' "Radioactive", which spent 87 weeks. In the process, the song also attained the longest chart run of any Hot 100 chart-topper in Billboard history, surpassing the 68-week run by LMFAO's "Party Rock Anthem" (2011–12). On November 23, 2021, the song surpassed "The Twist" (1960) as the number-one song of all time in Billboard Hot 100 history. On April 5, 2022, "Blinding Lights" was awarded a Diamond certification from the Recording Industry Association of America (RIAA) for selling ten million units in the United States.

"Blinding Lights" also became producer Max Martin's 23rd Hot 100 number one single as a writer, 21st as producer, and his first in both credits since Justin Timberlake's "Can't Stop the Feeling!" (2016). Martin has the third-most as writer, behind Paul McCartney (32) and John Lennon (26), and the second-most as producer, behind George Martin (23). The Weeknd became the first artist to simultaneously lead Billboard's five primary charts on March 30, topping the Hot 100, Billboard 200, Artist 100, Hot 100 Songwriters and Hot 100 Producers. The next week, he topped the Hot 100, Billboard 200 and Artist 100 once more, achieving the feat for a fourth time.

On the Rolling Stone Top 100 Songs chart, the song debuted at number two, where it was blocked from the top spot by the Weeknd's own "Heartless". The song also became the Weeknd's second entry on the chart. It later rose to number one on the chart following the release of After Hours.

In the singer's native Canada, "Blinding Lights" debuted at number two on the Canadian Hot 100, one place higher than "Heartless". It later managed to reach number one after the release of its parent album on the issue dated April 4, 2020, becoming the Weeknd's fifth number-one single in the country. It spent seven weeks atop the chart, tying "Starboy" as his longest-running chart-topper. In May 2021, "Blinding Lights" dropped off the Canadian Hot 100 after 75 weeks on the chart, leaving it one week short of the all-time record set by "I Gotta Feeling" by the Black Eyed Peas in 2010. For the first half of 2020, "Blinding Lights" was the top Canadian song overall, with 484,000 units. It has been certified Diamond by Music Canada for selling 800,000 units.

=== Europe, Oceania and Latin America ===
In the United Kingdom,"Blinding Lights" debuted at number 12 on the UK Singles Chart on December 6, 2019 – for the week ending date December 12, 2019. It eventually peaked at the top of the chart in February 2020, becoming the Weeknd's first number-one single in Britain. After two weeks at number one, it dropped a place number two. However it rebounded to number one the week after, and remained there for three consecutive weeks. The week after it fell a place to number two and also stayed at the runner-up spot for another week. The following week, it once again rebounded to number one, and stayed there for another three consecutive weeks. Overall, the single spent eight non-consecutive weeks atop the singles chart. It dropped to number two on April 24, 2020 – for the week ending April 30, 2020 – after the Weeknd used Twitter to ask people to support its close rival, a charity single, "You'll Never Walk Alone", by Michael Ball and Captain Sir Tom Moore, and make it number one for Moore's 100th birthday. As a result, "Blinding Lights" dropped a place to number two and remained at number two the following week, behind another charity single, "Times Like These". According to the Official Charts Company, "Blinding Lights" became Britain's biggest-selling song of 2020 with 2.2 million combined sales, including 250 million streams and 195,000 downloads. "Blinding Lights" has been certified 6× Platinum by the British Phonographic Industry for selling 3,600,000 units.

Elsewhere in Europe, the song topped the charts in Austria, Belgium, Croatia, Czech Republic, Denmark, Estonia, Finland, France, Germany, Greece, Italy, Latvia, Lithuania, Netherlands, Norway, Poland, Portugal, the Republic of Ireland, Serbia, Slovakia, Slovenia, Sweden, and Switzerland. It also peaked within the top ten of the charts in Belarus, Hungary, Malta, North Macedonia, Russia, Romania, Spain, and Ukraine.

In Australia, it topped the ARIA Charts for eleven non-consecutive weeks. It is the sixth longest-running number-one of all-time in the country, tied with songs such as Spice Girls's "Wannabe", Drake's "God's Plan" and Bryan Adams' "(Everything I Do) I Do It for You", as well the fifth longest by a foreign act. "Blinding Lights" has been certified 13× Platinum by the Australian Recording Industry Association for selling 910,000 units.

In New Zealand, the song topped the New Zealand Singles Chart for four non-consecutive weeks.

In Latin America, "Blinding Lights" topped the charts in Bolivia and Mexico. It also reached the top 10 in Chile, Costa Rica, Ecuador, El Salvador, Honduras, Panama, Puerto Rico and Uruguay, as well as the top 20 in Argentina, Nicaragua, Paraguay and Peru. It also charted in Brazil and Colombia, peaking at numbers 51 and 66 respectively.

=== Global ===
"Blinding Lights" was the best-selling global single of 2020, earning 2.72 billion subscription stream equivalents globally. For this feat, it was awarded the IFPI Global Digital Single Award by the International Federation of the Phonographic Industry (IFPI). It was also the seventh best-selling global single of 2021 with 1.61 billion subscription stream equivalents globally and the fourteenth best-selling global single of 2022 with 1.01 billion subscription stream equivalents globally.

"Blinding Lights" has also broken numerous records on streaming platform Spotify. It was the most-streamed song of 2020 on the platform with nearly 1.6 billion streams. On February 24, 2021, it became the first song by a Canadian artist and only the fourth song in history to pass two billion plays on the platform; it also broke the record for the fastest song to do so, in under 15 months. On June 15, 2022, it became the first song by a Canadian artist and only the second song in history to surpass three billion streams, and also broke the record for the fastest song to do so. On January 1, 2023, "Blinding Lights" overtook Ed Sheeran's "Shape of You" to become the most streamed song of all time on the platform, with over 3.332 billion streams at the time. On January 12, 2024, it became the first song to pass the 4 billion stream mark on Spotify.

== Music video ==
=== Development ===
The music video for "Blinding Lights" was directed by Anton Tammi, assisted by Kenneth Taylor, and filmed in Fremont Street, Las Vegas and Downtown Los Angeles, during a four-day shooting that took place until 6 AM every day. It was produced by Sarah Parker and executive produced by Saskia Whinney for Somesuch, with production design by Adam William Wilson. Olliver Millar served as the director of photography, assisted by Devin "Daddy" Karringten on the second unit, Niels Lindelien on the steadicam operation, Nizzar Najm on the gaffer and Marlow Nunez on the key grip. The video was edited by Janne Vartia and Tim Montana, and included VFX by Mathematic, post production surpervision by Alec Ernest, color by Nicke Jacobsson, sound design by Akseli Soini, title design by Aleksi Tammi and 3D effects by Oscar Böckerman.

The roads were not completely shut down while filming for the street scenes so cars and pedestrians passing are seen in the video while the Weeknd dances in the street. Production was held up temporarily when somebody was arrested in the tunnel. The shooting required at least three vehicles driving through the nighttime streets. The Mercedes-AMG GT roadster was a specially equipped towed vehicle that allowed the Weeknd to act and lip-sync inside the moving convertible without needing to drive, and a chase SUV with a crane camera strapped to the top. Director of photography Oliver Millar said that he loves the music video format and talked about how intense it is to try and create iconic images during high-pressure shoots that don't last very long. He said that since the Weeknd's previous videos had a dark and gritty vibe, he used generators powering banks of LED lights and a Sony Venice full-frame digital motion picture camera system to try to re-create the look, ending up with the video's vintage, 1980s style.

=== Release and synopsis ===
On December 2, 2019, a commercial video containing footage from the Weeknd and Mercedes-Benz commercial, and the song's audio video, was released. The lyric video for "Blinding Lights" was released on December 6, 2019. Its official music video was released on January 21, 2020. A behind-the-scenes music video for the song was released on February 28, 2020. On May 5, 2020, a music video for the Chromatics remix of the song was released.

The video follows the After Hours videos sequence, starting where the "Heartless" premise ended, and presents the Weeknd as a lonely and psychotic guy walking and driving with no destination around the streets in Las Vegas, and a passing resemblance to jazz musician Herbie Hancock, circa 1978's Sunlight. The singer sports the same garb as the previous video, adopted for the album promotion, with a red suit, specific hairstyle, mustache and sunglasses. The visual opens with the Weeknd laughing as blood drips down his face, then jumps back in time to show the mayhem that led to his gruesome end — the pop star speeding around a deserted city, dancing gleefully in the streets. The visual follows the events of the music video for "Heartless" and sees the Weeknd go on a hallucinated joyride after waking from a trance. It concludes with the Weeknd having flashbacks to a club he attended earlier in the night, where he was serenaded by a mysterious woman, played by Japanese actress Miki Hamano and beat up by a duo of bouncers, uncredited, who had forced him to go on the run. The video depicts the singer amid a story inspired by the films Fear and Loathing in Las Vegas, Joker, and Casino.

=== Reception ===
Chase Ichiki from Revolt spoke highly of the music video, sharing that "the Weeknd crafts a world fans have eagerly waited for. Donning his staple red suit, he showcases his acting abilities in his latest video. Beginning with him hysterically laughing in a borderline psychotic way, then we see the Weeknd dance the pain away while wandering the city". Michael Cube from Nylon magazine wrote that "the video for "Blinding Lights" is appropriately cryptic for the famously elusive artist", and praised the presentation's alluring mystique. HITC columnist Christopher Weston assessed the film as "a burst of neon perfectly complimenting the gorgeous electronic sound. The 'Blinding Lights' visual accompaniment is one of the most stylish videos we've seen, packed with color, fast cars, nocturnal cityscapes and luxurious locations." Insider editor Callie Ahlgrim praised the visual, "'Blinding Lights' embodies everything that's made the Weeknd's newest era so successful. The video maintains his mysterious, slightly menacing aura — yet manages to create a cinematic, retro, exhilarating experience that's unlike anything he's done before". Bianca Gracie from Vulture named the music video one of the best of 2020: "It's a wild mix of Fear and Loathing in Las Vegas, Casino, and Joker that only Abel could pull off". USA Today editor Gary Dinges named the visual one of the best of 2020. The clip was nominated for six MTV Video Music Awards, and won two including Best R&B Video & Video of the Year. The visual was nominated for four UK Music Video Awards, and won Best Pop Video – International.

== Live performances ==
The Weeknd performed "Blinding Lights" for the first time on December 6, 2019, during The Late Show with Stephen Colbert, a day after he performed "Heartless" on the same show. He brought a neon-lit cube with mirrored walls to the stage to sing through his brand new single. Filmed in black and white and from different perspectives on the stage, the Weeknd made the most of his mirror-cube before stepping outside of it to face the crowd. They sang the chorus of the track back to him, and some members of the audience raised mirrors of their own to flash The Weeknd's glow back on him.

The song was performed on January 22, 2020, at Jimmy Kimmel Live!. The performance picked up right where the "Blinding Lights" visual left off, as the Weeknd remained in the red suit and his face was still bloodied with a bandage over his nose from the beatdown he vaguely remembered in the music video. He bounced around the stage for the lively performance, as thunderbolts and lightning strikes at his back filled the darkness in the venue. Appearing once again in a red suit, black gloves and bloody-faced with a bandage over his nose, he performed the single alongside "Scared to Live" on Saturday Night Live on March 7, 2020.

"Blinding Lights" received a special performance during The Weeknd Experience, an augmented reality, interactive livestream held on TikTok on August 7, 2020. It featured 3D visuals and several interactive components, including virtual back-up dancers appearing behind the Weeknd, who also traveled through hyperspace in a red convertible, surrounded by lasers in the virtual world. The Weeknd kicked off the 2020 MTV Video Music Awards with "Blinding Lights", described in advance as a "keyed-up, dazzling" showcase. He performed a rooftop version of his hit single from the observation deck at 30 Hudson Yards in Manhattan, New York City, complete with a background of fireworks.

The single was also performed live in the 2020 Time 100 primetime event and the Z100 Jingle Ball of 2020.

The Weeknd performed "Blinding Lights" as the closing track for the Super Bowl LV halftime show. On the field, he was surrounded by hundreds of the Weeknd-alike dancers. In the beginning, he moved with them in lock step, but as the song swelled, and the dancers began to swarm in odd patterns, the Weeknd moved in his own rhythm, holding the camera's gaze, alone amid the chaos.

== Other versions ==
=== Remixes ===
The song's first official remix features vocals from Chromatics and is included in the original deluxe edition of After Hours and the remix EP After Hours (Remixes). A second official remix by Major Lazer was released on April 15, 2020. An unofficial remix by W&W was released on July 2, 2020. A third official remix with Rosalía was released on December 4, 2020.

==== Rosalía remix ====
"Blinding Lights (Remix)"

Promotional single by the Weeknd and Rosalía
- Released: December 4, 2020
- Recorded: October 2020
- Length: 3:36
- Label: XO; Republic
- Songwriters: Abel Tesfaye; Ahmad Balshe; Jason Quenneville; Max Martin; Oscar Holter; Rosalía Vila
- Producers: Max Martin; Oscar Holter; The Weeknd

Lyric video
- "Blinding Lights (Remix)" on YouTube

A remix of the song featuring Spanish singer and songwriter Rosalía was released on December 4, 2020, six hours after its announcement to celebrate the first year since the release of the solo version of the song, which was named "the best-selling song of the year" by Billboard the day before. A lyric video featuring behind-the-scenes footage of the single's photoshoot was released the same day.

Starting from October, both artists started to comment on each other's social media posts. In November, some insiders reported that a "Save Your Tears" remix featuring the Spanish singer would be released on the 20th. This, however, never happened. However, on December 1, another insider reported that a duet version of "Blinding Lights" would be released on December 4. Both artists shared a picture of them on set a couple hours prior to the single's release without specifying the project.

=== Cover versions ===
YouTube metal cover artist, Leo Moracchioli, released a version in April 2020 playing all instruments and the vocals himself. On April 22, 2020, New Zealand band The Naked and Famous released a cover of the song. On July 1, 2020, quintet vocalist group Pentatonix released a video for their rendition of "Blinding Lights." In the clip, the group is seen in their respective homes. On July 3, 2020, Christine and the Queens released his studio cover of "Blinding Lights". "[His] version is an emotive yet airy rendition. The artist's pillowy voice glides effortlessly no matter the heights", Consequence of Sound editor Lake Schatz stated. On August 21, 2020, Rainych Ran released a video for her rendition of "Blinding Lights" in Japanese. This cover received praise by the Weeknd himself on YouTube and Twitter. In September 2020, London Grammar covered "Blinding Lights" at the BBC Radio 1's Live Lounge, backed by piano and guitar players.

On September 12, 2020, The Weeknd released the audio for the instrumental for Blinding Lights along with its music video (which is a disoriented version of the originals music video) being released on October 29, 2020, exactly 11 months after the original single's release. As of September 28, 2023, the audio and music video have both accumulated over 5M views on YouTube alone.

Phoenix Recordings ended 2020 with a cover version of "Blinding Lights" remade by Dutch producer duo Leo van Goch and the Sixth Sense featuring the vocals of Georgia-based singer Sevda B, including a remix by Germany's Chris SX.

In January 2021 a bilingual Welsh and Irish version of Blinding Lights was released by Urdd Gobaith Cymru and TG Lurgan, "Golau'n Dallu/Dallta ag na Soilse". The project was hailed by First Minister of Wales Mark Drakeford as a "symbol of the cultural ties that bind Ireland and Wales". In November 2021, Canadian-American supergroup Saint Asonia released a hard rock version of the song as a promotional single for their EP Introvert.

American rock band All Time Low released a pop punk cover on June 6, 2022.

German epic metal band Feuerschwanz covered the track on their 2023 album Tötsunden in an emotive performance.

In January 2025, American pop rock band Smash Mouth covered the track for Cleopatra Records' compilation album, Punk Rock Valentines. The band had received backlash for using AI to make the cover art.

== Tebey version ==
"Blinding Lights (Country Version)"

Single by Tebey
- Released: March 9, 2024
- Genre: Country
- Length: 2:57
- Label: Jayward; Sony Canada; The Weeknd XO
- Songwriters: Abel Tesfaye; Ahmad Balshe; Jason Quenneville; Max Martin; Oscar Holter
- Producers: Tebey; Danick Dupelle

Tebey singles chronology
| "Hold Your Horses" (2024) | "Blinding Lights (Country Version)" (2024) | "Hangover at My Place" (2025) |

Music video
- "Blinding Lights (Country Version)" on YouTube

In 2024, Canadian singer Tebey released a country music cover of the song. His version initially charted on the Billboard Canada Country chart without soliciting airplay. Tebey won the award for "Innovative Campaign of the Year" at the 2024 Canadian Country Music Awards for his "case study" promotion of the song.

=== Accolades ===
| Year | Association | Category | Result | Ref |
|---|---|---|---|---|
| 2024 | Canadian Country Music Association | Innovative Campaign of the Year | Won | |
| 2025 | Country Music Association of Ontario | Music Video of the Year - "Blinding Lights (Country Version)" | Nominated | |
| 2025 | Country Music Association of Ontario | Single of the Year - "Blinding Lights (Country Version)" | Nominated | |

=== Charts ===
Chart performance for "Blinding Lights (Country Version)"
| Chart (2024) | Peak position |
|---|---|
| Australia Country Hot 50 (The Music) | 6 |
| Canada Country (Billboard) | 20 |

== In popular culture ==
- The intro to "Blinding Lights" has been used in a TikTok choreographed dance challenge known as the "Blinding Lights Challenge".
- It was used to promote Super Bowl LV, and featured as the theme song for WrestleMania 36.
- "Blinding Lights" appears on the NBA 2K21 video game soundtrack.
- The song is featured on the dance rhythm game, Just Dance 2021.
- The song was featured on Fortnite's Joy Ride update via Fortnite Radio, as well as added as an icon series emote, complete with the original song. The song would later make another appearance in the game's "Fortnite Festival" mode as a playable track in 2023.
- Backstreet Boy AJ McLean and Cheryl Burke danced the jive to the song on the premiere of Dancing with the Stars.
- In December 2021, OpenSea partnered with Billboard to auction an NFT collection commemorating “Blinding Lights” performance on the Billboard Hot 100.
- A remix of the song is played in the trailer for the 2022 Marvel Cinematic Universe (MCU) Disney+ series Ms. Marvel. It is also used in the opening scene of its pilot episode, "Generation Why".
- The Vietnamese singer Jack-J97 aroused controversy by allegedly plagiarizing from "Blinding Lights" with his song "Ngôi sao cô đơn". The song and music video have the same style and "vibe" as the Weeknd's, but different in execution. The song was set to be released at 20:09 pm on July 19 (Vietnam time).
- The song was featured in the 2025 film Hurry Up Tomorrow, which Tesfaye starred in.
- The song was featured in the 2026 television special, The Muppet Show; with Rizzo and the rats performing it on a city street set, but Beauregard accidentally shorts out the lighting system, plunging the number into chaos.
- The song was featured in the closing "fast-forward" in the 2026 season 5 finale of For All Mankind, as the wrecked Mars-94 spacecraft is depicted adrift in deep space.

== Personnel ==
Credits adapted from the Weeknd's official website and Tidal.

- The Weeknd – songwriting, vocals, production, programming, keyboards, bass, guitar, drums
- Belly – songwriting
- Jason Quenneville – songwriting
- Max Martin – songwriting, production, programming, keyboards, bass, guitar, drums
- Oscar Holter – songwriting, production, programming, keyboards, bass, guitar, drums
- Shin Kamiyama – engineering
- Cory Bice – engineering assistant
- Jeremy Lertola – engineering assistant
- Sean Klein – engineering assistant
- Şerban Ghenea – mixing
- John Hanes – engineering for mixing
- Dave Kutch – mastering
- Kevin Peterson – mastering

== Charts ==
=== Weekly charts ===
Weekly chart performance
| Chart (2019–2026) | Peak position |
|---|---|
| Argentina Hot 100 (Billboard) | 11 |
| Australia (ARIA) | 1 |
| Austria (Ö3 Austria Top 40) | 1 |
| Belarus Airplay (TopHit) | 90 |
| Belgium (Ultratop 50 Flanders) | 1 |
| Belgium (Ultratop 50 Wallonia) | 1 |
| Bolivia Airplay (Monitor Latino) | 1 |
| Brazil Airplay (Top 100 Brasil) | 51 |
| Bulgaria Airplay (PROPHON) | 1 |
| Canada Hot 100 (Billboard) | 1 |
| Canada AC (Billboard) | 1 |
| Canada CHR/Top 40 (Billboard) | 1 |
| Canada Hot AC (Billboard) | 1 |
| Central America Anglo Airplay (Monitor Latino) | 16 |
| Chile Airplay (Monitor Latino) | 7 |
| CIS Airplay (TopHit) | 2 |
| Colombia (National-Report) | 66 |
| Costa Rica Airplay (Monitor Latino) | 5 |
| Croatia International Airlay (Top lista) | 1 |
| Czech Republic Airplay (ČNS IFPI) | 1 |
| Czech Republic Singles Digital (ČNS IFPI) | 1 |
| Denmark (Tracklisten) | 1 |
| Ecuador Airplay (Monitor Latino) | 5 |
| El Salvador Airplay (Monitor Latino) | 4 |
| Estonia (Eesti Tipp-40) | 1 |
| Euro Digital Song Sales (Billboard) | 1 |
| Finland (Suomen virallinen lista) | 1 |
| France (SNEP) | 1 |
| Germany (GfK) | 1 |
| Global 200 (Billboard) | 2 |
| Greece International (IFPI) | 1 |
| Honduras Airplay (Monitor Latino) | 8 |
| Hong Kong (Billboard) | 22 |
| Hungary (Dance Top 40) | 10 |
| Hungary (Rádiós Top 40) | 1 |
| Hungary (Single Top 40) | 2 |
| Hungary (Stream Top 40) | 1 |
| Iceland (Tónlistinn) | 1 |
| India International (IMI) | 8 |
| Ireland (IRMA) | 1 |
| Ireland Airplay (Radiomonitor) | 1 |
| Israel International Airplay (Media Forest) | 1 |
| Italy (FIMI) | 1 |
| Japan Hot 100 (Billboard) | 59 |
| Kazakhstan Airplay (TopHit) | 36 |
| Latvia Airplay (TopHit) | 47 |
| Latvia Streaming (LaIPA) | 1 |
| Lebanon (Lebanese Top 20) | 2 |
| Lithuania (AGATA) | 1 |
| Malaysia (RIM) | 2 |
| Mexico Airplay (Billboard) | 1 |
| Mexico Streaming (AMPROFON) | 7 |
| Moldova Airplay (TopHit) | 66 |
| Netherlands (Dutch Top 40) | 1 |
| Netherlands (Single Top 100) | 1 |
| New Zealand (Recorded Music NZ) | 1 |
| Nicaragua Airplay (Monitor Latino) | 11 |
| Norway (VG-lista) | 1 |
| Panama Airplay (Monitor Latino) | 9 |
| Paraguay Airplay (Monitor Latino) | 11 |
| Peru (Monitor Latino) | 17 |
| Poland Airplay (ZPAV) | 1 |
| Portugal (AFP) | 1 |
| Puerto Rico Airplay (Monitor Latino) | 5 |
| Romania (Airplay 100) | 7 |
| Russia Airplay (TopHit) | 2 |
| Scottish Singles Sales (Official Charts) | 1 |
| Singapore (RIAS) | 1 |
| Slovakia Airplay (ČNS IFPI) | 1 |
| Slovakia Singles Digital (ČNS IFPI) | 1 |
| Slovenia (SloTop50) | 1 |
| South Africa Streaming (RISA) | 45 |
| South Korea (Gaon) | 136 |
| Spain (Promusicae) | 5 |
| Sweden (Sverigetopplistan) | 1 |
| Switzerland (Schweizer Hitparade) | 1 |
| Ukraine Airplay (TopHit) | 3 |
| UK Singles (Official Charts) | 1 |
| UK Hip Hop/R&B (Official Charts) | 1 |
| Uruguay Airplay (Monitor Latino) | 4 |
| US Billboard Hot 100 | 1 |
| US Adult Contemporary (Billboard) | 1 |
| US Adult Pop Airplay (Billboard) | 1 |
| US Dance Airplay (Billboard) | 2 |
| US Dance Club Songs (Billboard) | 44 |
| US Hot R&B/Hip-Hop Songs (Billboard) | 1 |
| US Pop Airplay (Billboard) | 1 |
| US Rhythmic Airplay (Billboard) | 2 |
| US Rolling Stone Top 100 | 1 |
| Venezuela Anglo (Record Report) | 1 |
| Venezuela Rock (Record Report) | 1 |
| Vietnam (Vietnam Hot 100) | 9 |

=== Monthly charts ===
Monthly chart performance
| Chart (2019–2023) | Position |
|---|---|
| Brazil (Pro-Música Brasil) | 24 |
| CIS Airplay (TopHit) | 2 |
| Czech Republic (Rádio Top 100) | 1 |
| Czech Republic (Singles Digitál Top 100) | 1 |
| Kazakhstan Airplay (TopHit) | 71 |
| Latvia Airplay (LaIPA) | 6 |
| Paraguay (SGP) | 55 |
| Romania Airplay (TopHit) | 67 |
| Russia Airplay (TopHit) | 2 |
| Slovakia (Rádio Top 100) | 4 |
| Slovakia (Singles Digitál Top 100) | 2 |
| Ukraine Airplay (TopHit) | 7 |

Monthly chart performance
| Chart (2025) | Peak position |
|---|---|
| CIS Airplay (TopHit) | 100 |
| Lithuania Airplay (TopHit) | 8 |

=== Year-end charts ===
Annual chart rankings
| Chart (2020) | Position |
|---|---|
| Argentina Airplay (Monitor Latino) | 8 |
| Australia (ARIA) | 1 |
| Austria (Ö3 Austria Top 40) | 1 |
| Belgium (Ultratop Flanders) | 1 |
| Belgium (Ultratop Wallonia) | 1 |
| Bolivia Airplay (Monitor Latino) | 2 |
| Canada (Canadian Hot 100) | 2 |
| Chile Airplay (Monitor Latino) | 19 |
| CIS Airplay (TopHit) | 1 |
| Colombia Airplay (Monitor Latino) | 84 |
| Costa Rica Airplay (Monitor Latino) | 16 |
| Denmark (Tracklisten) | 1 |
| Dominican Republic Airplay (Monitor Latino) | 63 |
| Ecuador Airplay (Monitor Latino) | 23 |
| El Salvador Airplay (Monitor Latino) | 4 |
| France (SNEP) | 2 |
| Germany (Official German Charts) | 1 |
| Global Singles (IFPI) | 1 |
| Guatemala Airplay (Monitor Latino) | 83 |
| Honduras Airplay (Monitor Latino) | 14 |
| Hungary (Dance Top 40) | 36 |
| Hungary (Rádiós Top 40) | 5 |
| Hungary (Single Top 40) | 4 |
| Hungary (Stream Top 40) | 1 |
| Iceland (Tónlistinn) | 1 |
| Ireland (IRMA) | 1 |
| Italy (FIMI) | 8 |
| Japan Hot Overseas (Billboard) | 6 |
| Latin America Airplay (Monitor Latino) | 6 |
| Mexico Airplay (Monitor Latino) | 1 |
| Netherlands (Dutch Top 40) | 1 |
| Netherlands (Single Top 100) | 1 |
| New Zealand (Recorded Music NZ) | 2 |
| Nicaragua Airplay (Monitor Latino) | 21 |
| Norway (VG-lista) | 2 |
| Panama Airplay (Monitor Latino) | 13 |
| Paraguay Airplay (Monitor Latino) | 43 |
| Peru Airplay (Monitor Latino) | 31 |
| Portugal (AFP) | 1 |
| Poland (ZPAV) | 1 |
| Puerto Rico Airplay (Monitor Latino) | 11 |
| Romania (Airplay 100) | 22 |
| Russia Airplay (TopHit) | 1 |
| Slovenia Airplay (SloTop50) | 1 |
| Spain (PROMUSICAE) | 3 |
| Sweden (Sverigetopplistan) | 2 |
| Switzerland (Schweizer Hitparade) | 1 |
| Ukraine Airplay (TopHit) | 5 |
| UK Singles (OCC) | 1 |
| Uruguay Airplay (Monitor Latino) | 18 |
| US Billboard Hot 100 | 1 |
| US Adult Contemporary (Billboard) | 10 |
| US Adult Top 40 (Billboard) | 2 |
| US Dance/Mix Show Airplay (Billboard) | 3 |
| US Hot R&B/Hip-Hop Songs (Billboard) | 1 |
| US Mainstream Top 40 (Billboard) | 1 |
| US Rhythmic (Billboard) | 11 |
| Venezuela Airplay (Monitor Latino) | 71 |

| Chart (2021) | Position |
|---|---|
| Australia (ARIA) | 16 |
| Austria (Ö3 Austria Top 40) | 17 |
| Belgium (Ultratop Flanders) | 28 |
| Brazil Airplay (Crowley) | 98 |
| Brazil Streaming (Pro-Música Brasil) | 61 |
| Canada (Canadian Hot 100) | 20 |
| CIS Airplay (TopHit) | 44 |
| Denmark (Tracklisten) | 13 |
| France (SNEP) | 15 |
| Germany (Official German Charts) | 9 |
| Global 200 (Billboard) | 3 |
| Global Singles (IFPI) | 5 |
| Hungary (Dance Top 40) | 73 |
| Hungary (Rádiós Top 40) | 20 |
| Hungary (Single Top 40) | 52 |
| Hungary (Stream Top 40) | 23 |
| India International Streaming (IMI) | 6 |
| Ireland (IRMA) | 25 |
| Italy (FIMI) | 74 |
| Netherlands (Single Top 100) | 42 |
| New Zealand (Recorded Music NZ) | 25 |
| Norway (VG-lista) | 30 |
| Poland (ZPAV) | 83 |
| Portugal (AFP) | 12 |
| Russia Airplay (TopHit) | 79 |
| Spain (PROMUSICAE) | 37 |
| Sweden (Sverigetopplistan) | 19 |
| Switzerland (Schweizer Hitparade) | 10 |
| Ukraine Airplay (TopHit) | 47 |
| UK Singles (OCC) | 9 |
| US Billboard Hot 100 | 3 |
| US Adult Contemporary (Billboard) | 1 |
| US Adult Top 40 (Billboard) | 7 |
| US Hot R&B/Hip-Hop Songs (Billboard) | 8 |
| US Mainstream Top 40 (Billboard) | 39 |

| Chart (2022) | Position |
|---|---|
| Australia (ARIA) | 29 |
| Austria (Ö3 Austria Top 40) | 69 |
| Brazil Streaming (Pro-Música Brasil) | 154 |
| CIS Airplay (TopHit) | 87 |
| Denmark (Tracklisten) | 52 |
| France (SNEP) | 76 |
| Germany (Official German Charts) | 60 |
| Global 200 (Billboard) | 16 |
| Global Singles (IFPI) | 14 |
| Hungary (Rádiós Top 40) | 41 |
| Lithuania (AGATA) | 57 |
| Sweden (Sverigetopplistan) | 76 |
| Switzerland (Schweizer Hitparade) | 36 |
| Ukraine Airplay (TopHit) | 194 |
| UK Singles (OCC) | 44 |
| US Adult Contemporary (Billboard) | 45 |
| US Streaming Songs (Billboard) | 63 |
| Vietnam (Vietnam Hot 100) | 92 |

| Chart (2023) | Position |
|---|---|
| Australia (ARIA) | 55 |
| Belarus Airplay (TopHit) | 132 |
| Brazil Streaming (Pro-Música Brasil) | 193 |
| CIS Airplay (TopHit) | 97 |
| Denmark (Tracklisten) | 95 |
| Estonia Airplay (TopHit) | 136 |
| Global 200 (Billboard) | 29 |
| Hungary (Rádiós Top 40) | 68 |
| India International Streaming (IMI) | 11 |
| Kazakhstan Airplay (TopHit) | 82 |
| Netherlands (Single Top 100) | 100 |
| Romania Airplay (TopHit) | 103 |
| Switzerland (Schweizer Hitparade) | 76 |
| UK Singles (OCC) | 65 |

| Chart (2024) | Position |
|---|---|
| Australia (ARIA) | 75 |
| Australia Hip Hop/R&B (ARIA) | 11 |
| Belarus Airplay (TopHit) | 195 |
| CIS Airplay (TopHit) | 87 |
| Estonia Airplay (TopHit) | 146 |
| France (SNEP) | 110 |
| Global 200 (Billboard) | 43 |
| India International Streaming (IMI) | 9 |
| Portugal (AFP) | 152 |

| Chart (2025) | Position |
|---|---|
| Argentina Anglo Airplay (Monitor Latino) | 40 |
| Belarus Airplay (TopHit) | 148 |
| Chile Airplay (Monitor Latino) | 49 |
| CIS Airplay (TopHit) | 119 |
| Estonia Airplay (TopHit) | 136 |
| France (SNEP) | 179 |
| Global 200 (Billboard) | 58 |
| Lithuania Airplay (TopHit) | 38 |
| Poland (Polish Airplay Top 100) | 97 |

=== All-time charts ===
All-time chart performance
| Chart | Position |
|---|---|
| US Billboard Hot 100 | 1 |

== Certifications and sales ==
Certifications and sales
| Region | Certification | Certified units/sales |
|---|---|---|
| Australia (ARIA) | 22× Platinum | 1,540,000^{‡} |
| Austria (IFPI Austria) | 8× Platinum | 240,000^{‡} |
| Belgium (BRMA) | 4× Platinum | 160,000^{‡} |
| Brazil (Pro-Música Brasil) | 9× Diamond | 1,440,000^{‡} |
| Canada (Music Canada) | Diamond | 800,000^{‡} |
| Denmark (IFPI Danmark) | 7× Platinum | 630,000^{‡} |
| France (SNEP) | Diamond | 333,333^{‡} |
| Germany (BVMI) | 7× Gold | 2,100,000^{‡} |
| Italy (FIMI) | 6× Platinum | 600,000^{‡} |
| Mexico (AMPROFON) | 3× Platinum | 180,000^{‡} |
| New Zealand (RMNZ) | 10× Platinum | 300,000^{‡} |
| Norway (IFPI Norway) | 8× Platinum | 480,000^{‡} |
| Poland (ZPAV) | 2× Diamond | 500,000^{‡} |
| Portugal (AFP) | Diamond | 100,000^{‡} |
| Spain (Promusicae) | 8× Platinum | 480,000^{‡} |
| United Kingdom (BPI) | 8× Platinum | 4,800,000^{‡} |
| United States (RIAA) | Diamond | 10,000,000^{‡} |
Streaming
| Greece (IFPI Greece) | Diamond | 10,000,000^{†} |
| Japan (RIAJ) | Platinum | 100,000,000^{†} |
| Sweden (GLF) | 11× Platinum | 88,000,000^{†} |
| Worldwide | — | 5,310,000,000 |
^{‡} Sales+streaming figures based on certification alone.^{†} Streaming-only figures based on certification alone.

== Release history ==
| Region | Date | Format(s) | Version | Label(s) | Ref. |
|---|---|---|---|---|---|
| Various | November 29, 2019 | Digital download; streaming | Original | XO; Republic | |
| Italy | December 13, 2019 | Radio airplay | Original | Universal | |
| Canada | January 6, 2020 | Contemporary hit radio; hot AC radio | Original | Republic | |
| United States | January 6, 2020 | AC radio; hot AC radio; modern AC radio | Original | XO; Republic | |
| United States | January 7, 2020 | Contemporary hit radio | Original | XO; Republic | |
| United States | February 4, 2020 | Rhythmic contemporary | Original | XO; Republic | |
| Various | March 31, 2020 | Digital download; streaming | Major Lazer remix | XO; Republic | |
| Various | December 4, 2020 | Digital download; streaming | Rosalía remix | XO; Republic | |

== See also ==
- List of best-selling singles
- List of best-selling singles in Australia
- List of best-selling singles in Brazil
- List of Billboard Hot 100 chart achievements and milestones
- List of airplay number-one hits in Argentina
- List of number-one singles of 2020 (Australia)
- List of number-one hits of 2020 (Austria)
- List of Ultratop 50 number-one singles of 2020
- List of Canadian Hot 100 number-one singles of 2020
- List of number-one hits of 2020 (Denmark)
- List of number-one singles of 2020 (Finland)
- List of number-one hits of 2020 (France)
- List of number-one hits of 2020 (Germany)
- List of number-one singles of 2020 (Ireland)
- List of number-one hits of 2020 (Italy)
- List of Dutch Top 40 number-one singles of 2020
- List of number-one singles from the 2020s (New Zealand)
- List of number-one songs in Norway
- List of number-one singles of 2020 (Poland)
- List of number-one singles of 2020 (Portugal)
- List of number-one songs of 2020 (Singapore)
- List of number-one singles of 2020 (Slovenia)
- List of number-one singles of the 2020s (Sweden)
- List of number-one hits of 2020 (Switzerland)
- List of UK Singles Chart number ones of the 2020s
- List of Billboard Hot 100 number-one singles of 2020
- List of Billboard Hot 100 top-ten singles in 2020
- List of Billboard Adult Contemporary number ones of 2020
- List of Billboard Adult Contemporary number ones of 2021
- List of Billboard Adult Top 40 number-one songs of the 2020s
- List of Billboard Digital Song Sales number ones of 2020
- List of Billboard Mainstream Top 40 number-one songs of 2020
- List of Radio Songs number ones of the 2020s
- List of Billboard Streaming Songs number ones of 2020
- List of Spotify streaming records
