= Mount Ngauruhoe =

Active volcano in New Zealand

- Ngauruhoe seen from Mount Tongariro

Highest point
- Elevation: 2,291 m (7,516 ft)
- Listing: Mountains of New Zealand
- Coordinates: 39°09′24.6″S 175°37′55.8″E

Naming
- Pronunciation: Māori: [ŋaːʉɾʉhɔɛ]

Geography
- Location within New Zealand
- Location: North Island, New Zealand

Geology
- Mountain type: Parasitic cone (active)
- Volcanic zone: Taupō Volcanic Zone
- Last eruption: 1977

Climbing
- First ascent: March 1839 by John Bidwill, an English botanist. Two Māori guides came with him to within 1 kilometre of the peak.
- Easiest route: Scramble (summer)

Mount Ngauruhoe (Māori: Ngāuruhoe) is a volcanic cone in New Zealand. It is the youngest vent in the Tongariro stratovolcano complex on the Central Plateau of the North Island and first erupted about 2,500 years ago. Although often regarded as a separate mountain, geologically, it is a secondary cone of Mount Tongariro.

The volcano lies between the active volcanoes of Mount Tongariro to the north and Mount Ruapehu to the south, to the west of the Rangipo Desert and 25 kilometres (16 miles) to the south of the southern shore of Lake Taupō.

== Etymology ==
Before the initial mapping of the area introduced labelling confusion, the local Māori name for the cone was Tongariro, and its summit crater was known as Ngāuruhoe.

The local Māori traditions state that the volcano was named by Ngātoro-i-rangi, an ancestor of the local Māori iwi, Ngāti Tūwharetoa. Ngātoro-i-rangi called volcanic fire from his homeland Hawaiki, which eventually emerged at Ngauruhoe. The name given by Ngātoro-i-rangi (Ngāuruhoe) either commemorates his slave, who had died from the cold before the fire arrived, or refers to the insertions (ngā uru) of Ngātoro-i-rangi's hoe (paddle-like staff) into the ground during his summoning of the volcanic fire.

== Geology ==
Map that shows Mount Ngauruhoe, as largest pale orange Holocene cone. Also shown are other Tongariro vents, cones or craters active in the last 15,000 years. Vent areas are outlined in yellow. lakes in vents are outlined in blue. Clicking on the map enlarges it, and enables panning and mouseover of feature's name/wikilink and ages before present.

In this region of the southern Taupō Rift, the Tertiary greywacke basement is tens to hundreds of metres thick and hundreds of metres above sea level. The magma reservoir is about 5 km (3.1 mi) deep although other historic Tongariro vents to the south had much deeper magma sources.

== Recent activity ==
Ngauruhoe was New Zealand's most active volcano in the 20th century with 45 eruptions, the most recent in 1977. Fumaroles exist inside the inner crater and on the rim of the eastern, outer crater. Climbers who suffer from asthma may be affected by the strong sulphurous gases emitted from the crater.

A significant increase in earthquake activity in May 2006 prompted the alert level to be raised from zero (typical background activity, no signs of significant unrest) to one (signs of volcano unrest). Over the next two years GeoNet recorded an average of 5 to 30 earthquakes a day close to Ngauruhoe, though the maximum daily number was as high as 80.

After mid-2008, the number of volcanic earthquakes close to Ngauruhoe declined to the background level. Regular measurements of volcanic gas levels and the temperature of a summit gas vent failed to record any significant changes over the subsequent two and a half years. GNS Science accordingly reduced the alert level for Ngauruhoe to Level 0 on 2 December 2008. “The reduction in earthquake activity means that an eruption in the near future is unlikely without further earthquakes or other changes and the appropriate alert level is therefore zero”, said GNS Science Volcano Section Manager Gill Jolly.

An increase in seismic activity in March 2015 resulted in the alert level being raised to Level 1. The anomalous activity was deemed to have subsided after three weeks, and the alert level was lowered back to Level 0.

Despite these potential indicators, some geologists speculate that activity may have permanently shifted away from the mountain, as the current dormancy is by far the longest in the volcano's relatively short history, and recent eruptions from the parent Tongariro volcanic complex have all been further north.

== Climbing ==
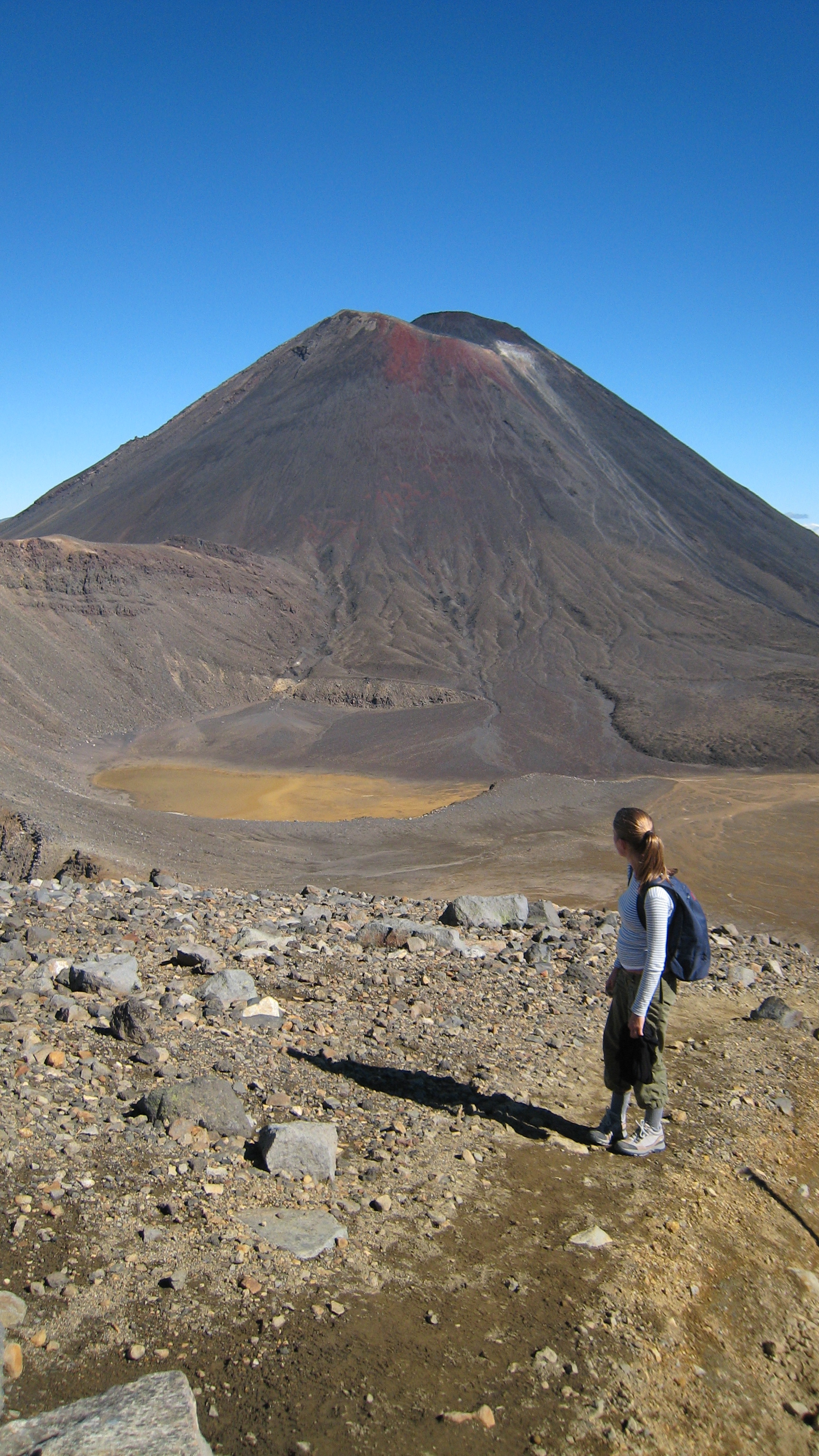
Ngauruhoe seen from across Tongariro's South Crater. The usual route up the mountain is visible on the right.

The mountain is usually climbed from the western side, from the Mangatepopo track. In summer the climb is difficult due to the loose tephra that gives way underfoot. In the summer of 2010 a climber was seriously injured by falling rock. In winter, snow consolidates the tephra. After rain, the snow may be covered by ice which is treacherous. Ice axes, crampons and ropes are recommended in midwinter. Between March and October the mountain is subject to sudden violent wind gusts and snow storms with the temperature dropping well below freezing.

There is also a route from the northern side which cuts across the lava flows in the Mangatepopo valley from the Mangatepopo hut. This route is far longer with no flat areas. On reaching the summit, climbers can circumnavigate the crater and descend the normal eastern route.

During the closure of the central part of the Mt. Tongariro one day walk, due to volcanic activity, climbing Mt. Ngauruhoe became a popular alternative. At Easter 2013 four climbers were injured in separate incidents. Two of the accidents were due to congestion on the normal eastern route to the crater when a climber caused loose rock to hit another climber below. All the injured had to be rescued by helicopter.

The Department of Conservation has asked trampers not to climb the mountain, out of respect for its tapu (sacred) nature.

== Film appearances ==
In 1974, as part of a promotional campaign for his sponsor Moët & Chandon, champion skier Jean-Claude Killy was filmed skiing down the previously unskied eastern slope of the mountain. The average slope on this side of the volcano is 35 degrees, and Killy was caught on radar skiing more than 100 miles per hour (160 kilometres per hour). As he fell on the first run, he did the descent twice. He used helicopters to access the mountain top when the last eruption had been the day before and an eruption occurred at the end of his final run.

Mount Ngauruhoe was used as a stand-in for the fictional Mount Doom in Peter Jackson's The Lord of the Rings film trilogy, achieving worldwide exposure.

== Climbing history ==
The first recorded ascent by a European was by John Bidwill in March 1839, the ascent being from the north-west. He reported that “The crater was the most terrific abyss I ever looked into or imagined … it was not possible to see above 10 yards into it from the quantity of steam which it was continually discharging”.

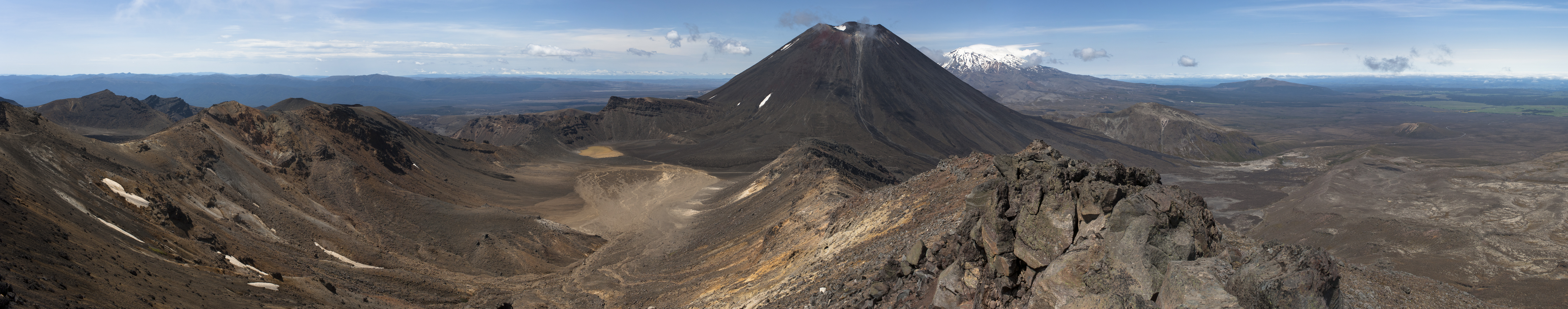
Panorama of Mount Ngauruhoe and surroundings as seen from Mount Tongariro, with Mount Ruapehu in the background.

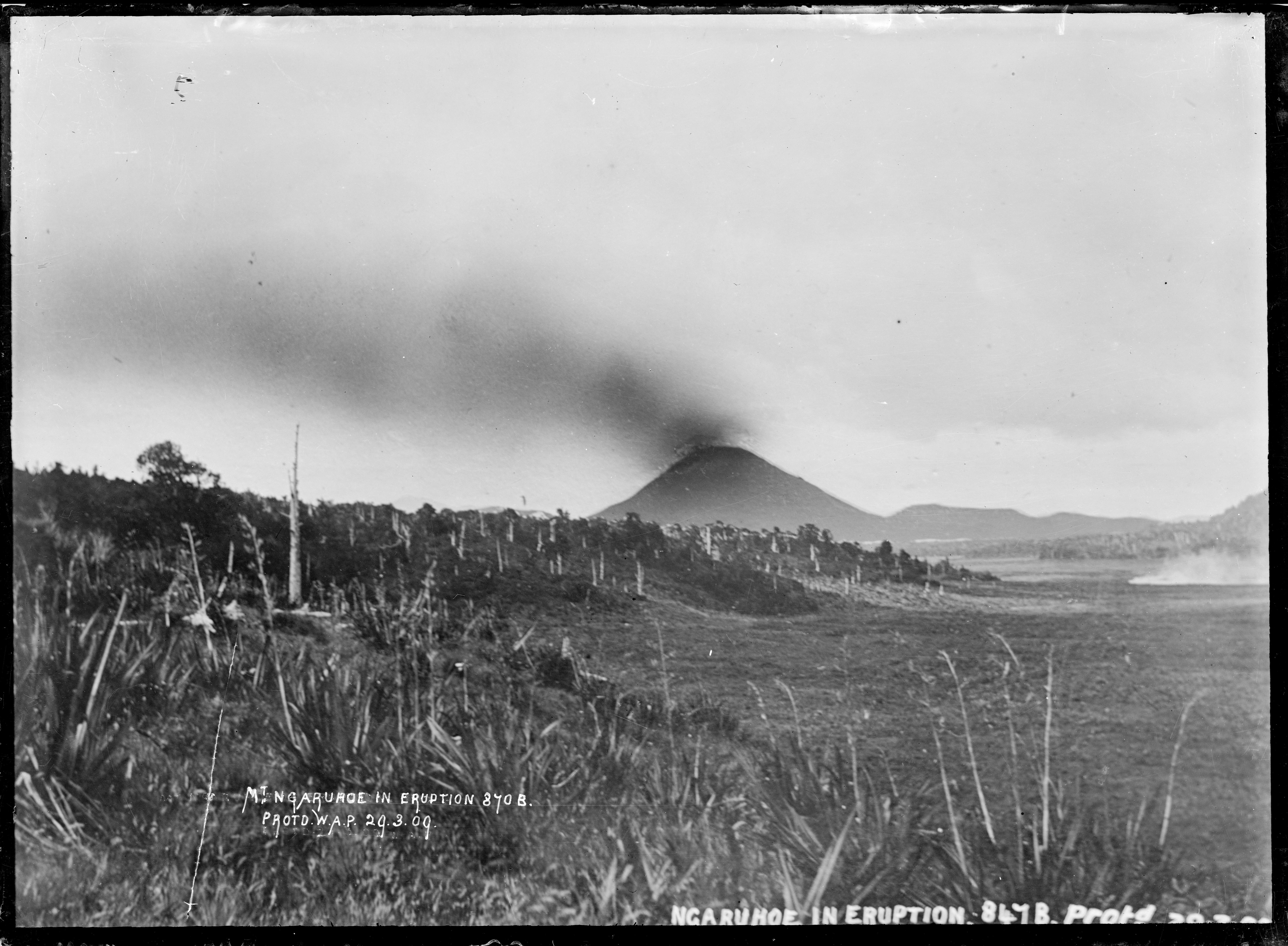
Mount Ngauruhoe in eruption, 1909.

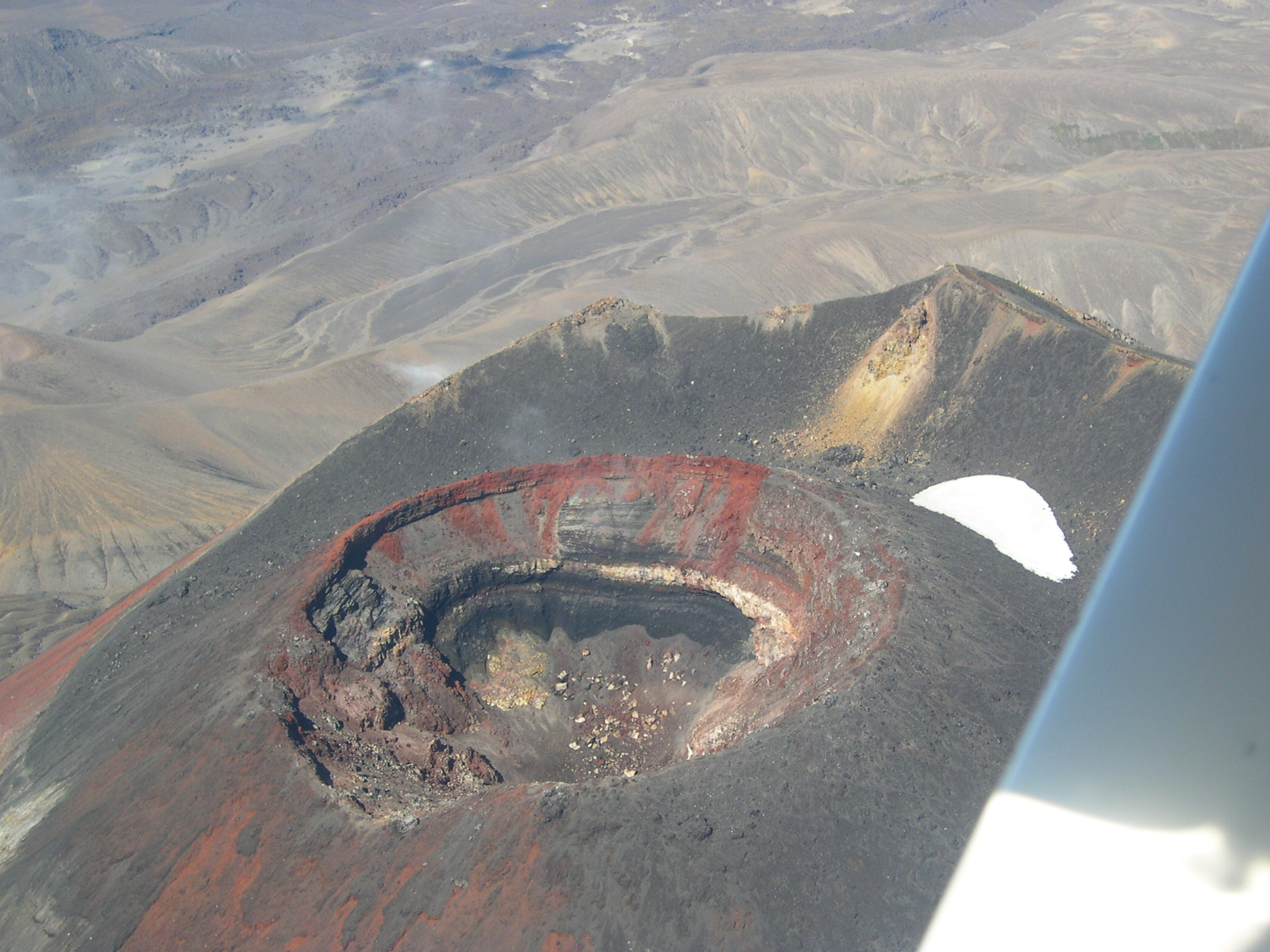
Aerial photo of Mount Ngauruhoe's crater.

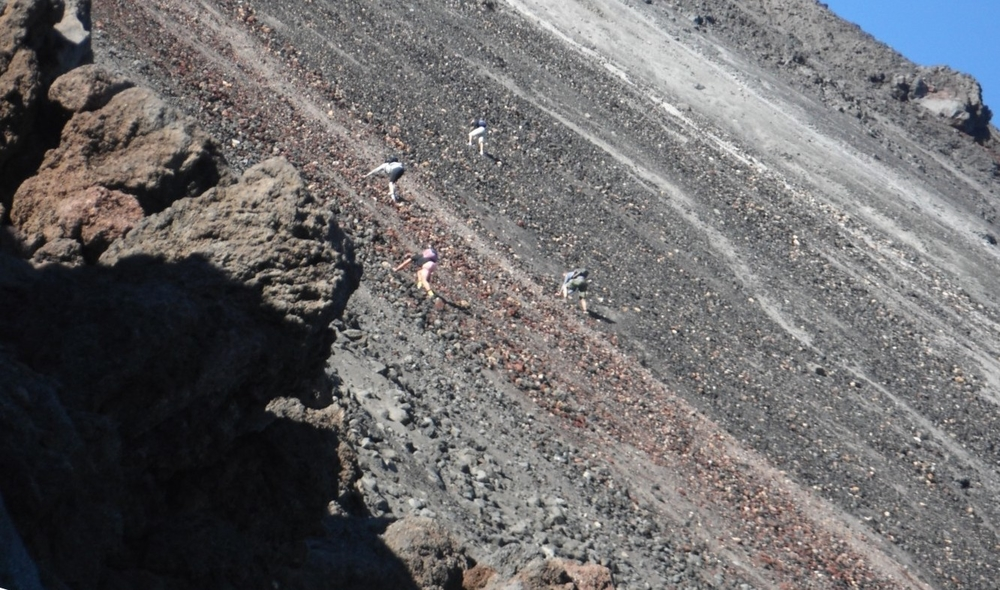
Scramblers up Mt. Ngauruhoe.

== See also ==
- List of volcanoes in New Zealand;
- Volcanism in New Zealand
