= Tsunami sirens in New Zealand =

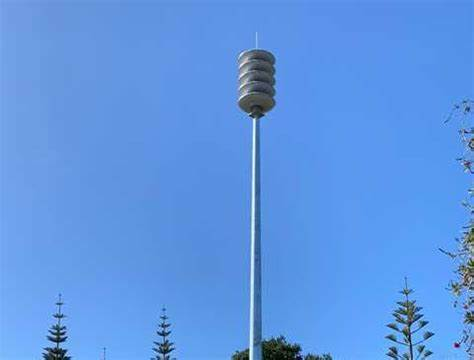
A tsunami warning siren in Auckland

While there are tsunami warning sirens throughout New Zealand, the country does not have a national tsunami warning siren system. Some individual areas have tsunami warning sirens which are activated by local Civil Defence Emergency Management groups. Tsunami sirens must follow a technical standard created by the National Emergency Management Agency, which standardises the siren signals, their meanings and the "requirements for their operation". Tsunami warnings are also issued over radio and to mobile phones via Emergency Mobile Alert and on TV and social media.

Areas that are prone to local-source tsunami (caused by nearby earthquakes) such as the Wellington Region and Napier do not have tsunami sirens, or have few tsunami sirens, due to the potential danger they pose to the public. These issues are that local-source tsunami waves could arrive before the sirens are activated and that earthquake shaking could cause the sirens to stop working. These issues could lead residents to wait for sirens that will not come, which happened after the 2011 Tōhoku earthquake and tsunami.

As of December 2013, over 90 per cent of New Zealand's tsunami sirens are on the east coast.

== By region ==
=== Northland ===
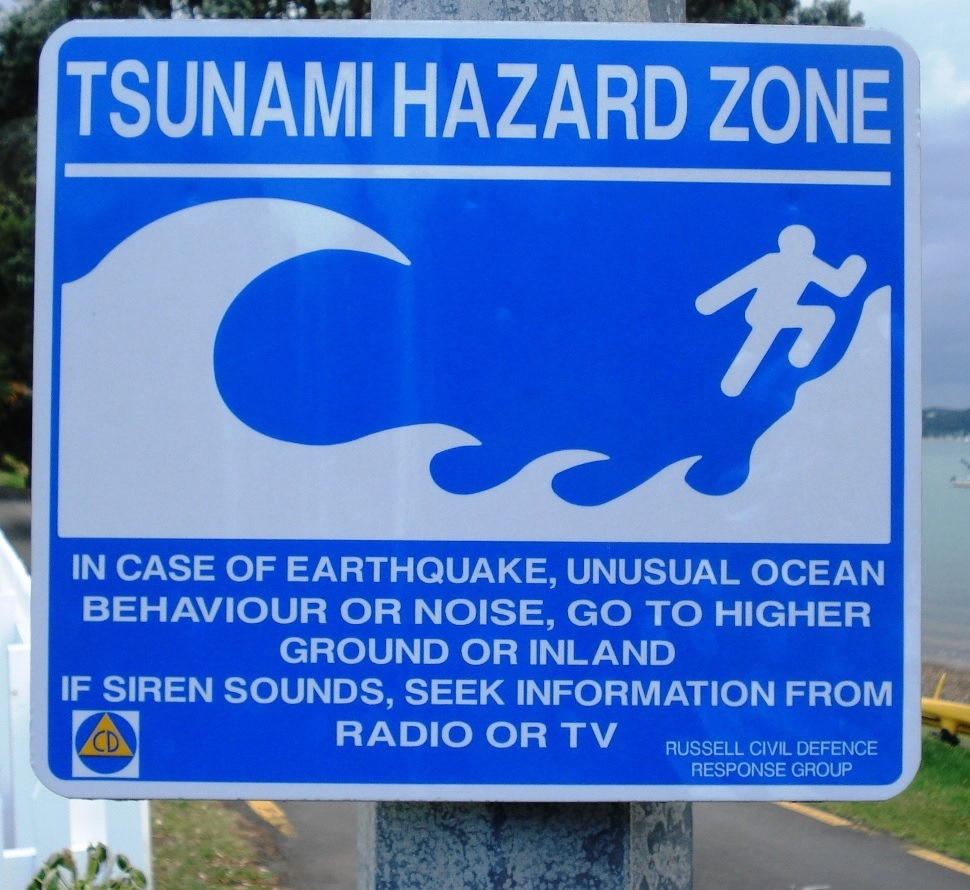
A tsunami hazard zone sign in Russell

In April 2024, Northland had 205 tsunami sirens, the most for any region in New Zealand. These sirens were installed gradually from 2010 to 2019. They were replaced with 94 louder, solar-powered sirens in 2024. Of these, 46 were planned for Whangārei, 42 in the Bay of Islands, 4 in Mangawhai and 2 in Ruawai. In May, after 8 of the 12 Whangārei Heads sirens had been placed, the installation was stopped due to complaints from the public about a lack of consultation and a degradation of coastal views. As a result, the siren in Parua Bay was removed.

The sirens are tested once every six months.

=== Auckland ===
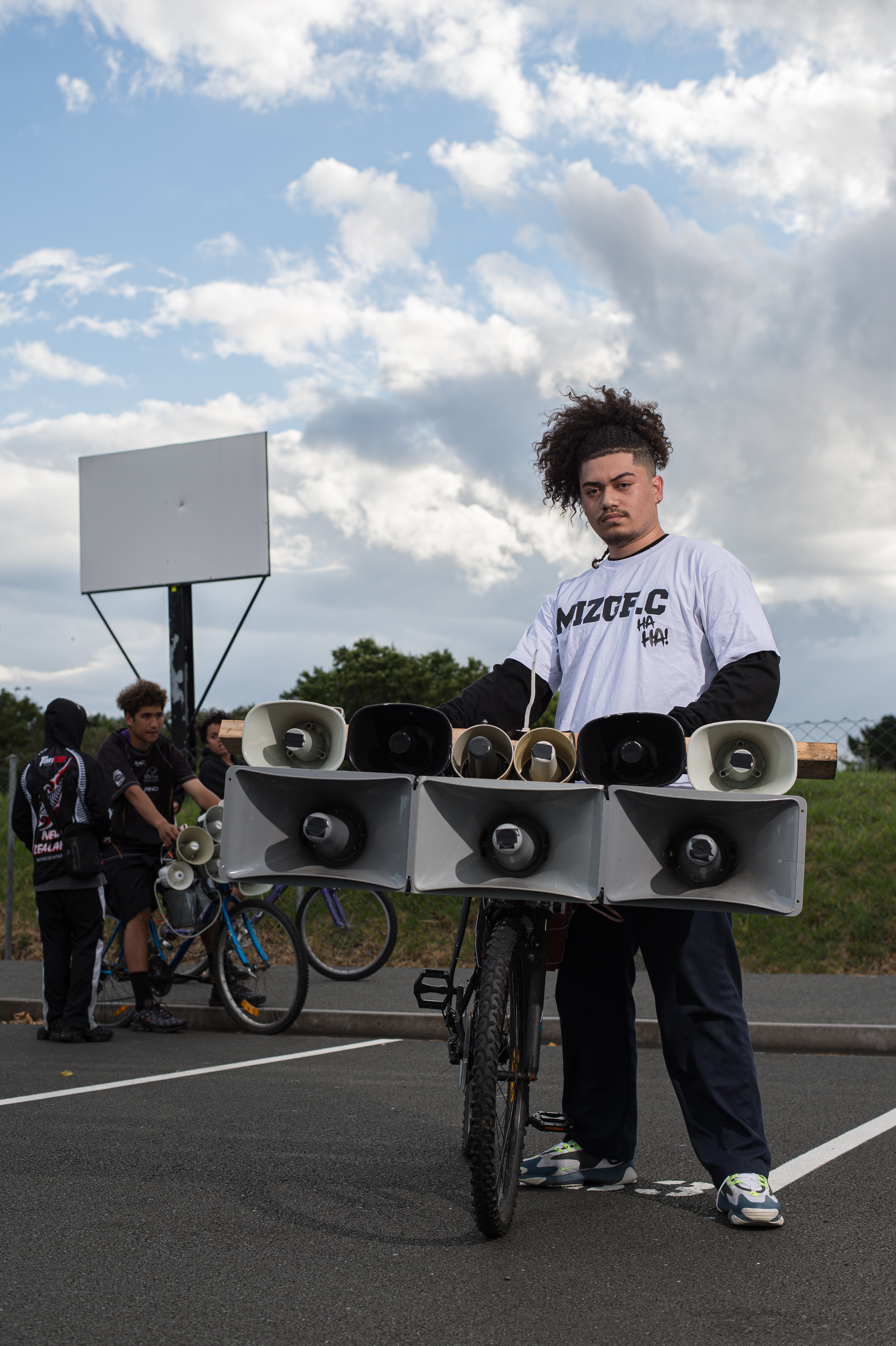
Siren beat producer Mizgf.C, standing with his modified bicycle, used in siren battles

In the year leading up to May 2023, 52 of Auckland's tsunami sirens were stolen. A spokesperson for Auckland Emergency Management stated that these were probably used for the siren battles youth subculture, where people steal sirens, attach them to cars or bicycles and play music, competing for the loudest and clearest sound. The tsunami sirens could not be modified to play music. Due to the theft and vandalism, and the age of the sirens, having been installed c. 2008, 10 of them in Rodney, 5 in Albany and 27 in Waitākere wards were decommissioned in December 2023. These constituted the majority of tsunami sirens in Auckland. Tsunami warnings are instead sent to mobile phones using Emergency Mobile Alerts.

=== Waikato and Bay of Plenty ===
In 2005, eleven tsunami sirens were installed in the western Bay of Plenty, from Waihi Beach to Mount Maunganui.

In January 2020, sirens in the Waikato and Bay of Plenty, including Waihi Beach, activated in a false alarm, causing residents to evacuate. Due to several amalgamations of the sirens's operators, they had become "forgotten" before the false alarm occurred. The sirens in the area were disabled in 2021. The Thames-Coromandel District Council decided not to upgrade the sirens and install new ones as it would have cost $5 million. It was estimated at the time that the sirens would only cover 44 per cent of the area's population, whereas other methods such as Emergency Mobile Alerts and radio broadcasts would have a coverage between 80 and 90 per cent. A petition to reconnect the sirens received 2,000 signatures. As of February 2022, the local Tsunami Sirens Silenced Group intends to buy its own tsunami sirens for the Coromandel Peninsula towns of Whitianga, Pauanui and Tairua.

=== Hawke's Bay ===
Warning sirens were installed in Napier in 1963 or the 1970s and were replaced around 2002. According to former Napier City Council CEO Wayne Jack, they have never intended to serve as tsunami warnings. However, the council's website has said that "The sirens are not just for tsunami warnings". Nevertheless, they were not activated after the 2016 Kaikōura earthquake despite an evacuation warning from Civil Defence. The council removed the sirens in 2022 after a report by the Joint Centre for Disaster Research of Massey University found them to be ineffective as they did not meet the country's tone standard, and the potential that they could cause danger to the public. For tsunami caused by local earthquakes, the sirens may not sound before the waves arrive, or may not sound at all due to earthquake damage.

Tsunami sirens were installed in 2010 in Hastings.

=== Manawatū-Whanganui ===
Tsunami warning sirens were installed in the Whanganui District following an offshore earthquake swarm in 1983 and 1984. There are sirens at Balgownie Avenue, Castlecliff and Mowhanau. They are tested once every month except January.

=== Wellington Region ===
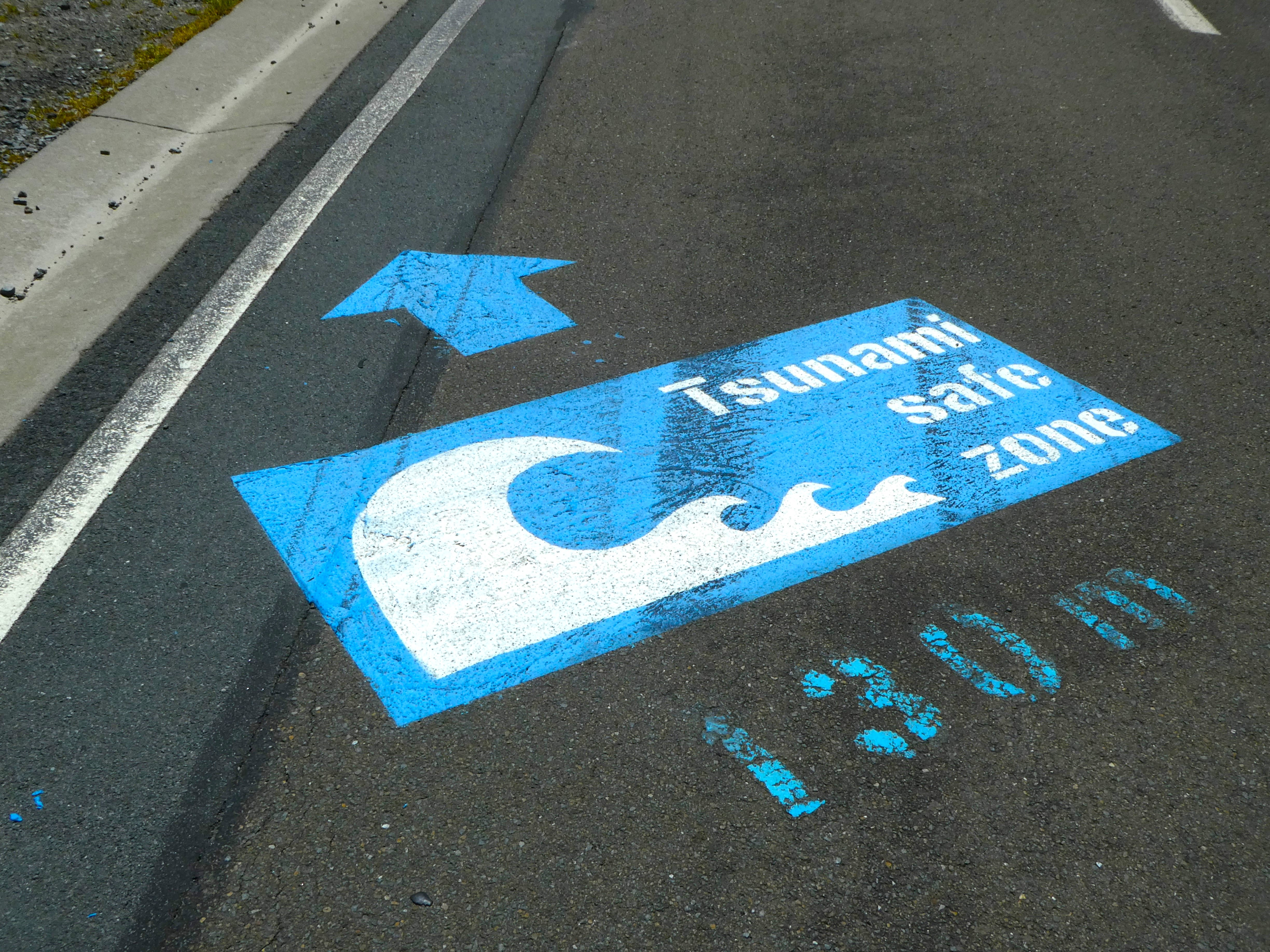
A tsunami safe zone road marking in Wellington

The Wellington Region does not have any tsunami sirens. One reason for this is that Wellington is prone to tsunami caused by local earthquakes. Tsunami waves from a nearby earthquake could arrive (possibly within 10 minutes) before scientists have a chance to determine whether the earthquake could cause a tsunami and activate the sirens. Another issue is that earthquake shaking could cause the sirens to malfunction. These issues could lead residents who need to evacuate to wait for sirens that will not come. Another issue is Wellington's wind, which makes it difficult for the sirens to be heard.

In the 1970s, sirens were installed in Lower Hutt to serve as flood warnings, but not tsunami warnings. These were activated however after the 2016 Kaikōura earthquake.

=== Canterbury ===
As of April 2026 Christchurch has 45 tsunami sirens, from Brooklands to Taylors Mistake. Of these, 22 were installed in 2012 at a cost of $550,000, between Waimari Beach and Sumner. Twenty five more were installed in 2015 around Christchurch. They are operated via radio signals transmitted from the Pages Road wastewater treatment plant, which are retransmitted by one of two repeaters (in the Port Hills and Sumner) to the sirens. The area's sirens were installed to serve as warnings for tsunami from across the Pacific Ocean, however, they were activated after New Zealand's 2016 Kaikōura earthquake. A tsunami alert was issued by Civil Defence at 1am, an hour after the earthquake, but the sirens did not activate until after 2am. This was the first time the sirens had been used outside of tests. After the late sounding was criticised, Christchurch mayor Lianne Dalziel called for a review and called the sirens a "waste of money" due to the "nature of the tsunami threat we face in the Christchurch environment and the fact they are only sirens and don't provide for voice commands". In April 2025 the sirens did not turn on during a test because a contractor was dealing with a car crash, which drew criticism on its dependency on one person. In June 2025 the council decided to remove all of its sirens.

Christchurch's sirens were tested twice a year, usually during the start and end of daylight savings. The tests would consist of the sirens being sounded for three minutes and then they would play a sound stating that "This is a test of the tsunami warning sirens. Do not be alarmed, this is only a test." The final siren test occurred in April 2026.

There are tsunami sirens in the Timaru District, including Washdyke, Rangitata and Timaru city, which were installed in 2019 through 2021. Mechanical sirens were originally installed in the district in about the 1960s, with newer sirens being installed in the 1980s and late 2000s. The tsunami sirens in Hurunui were installed in 2010.

=== Southland ===
As of 2024 Invercargill does not have any tsunami warning sirens. Sirens were installed in the city in 1984 and 1985 after Southland was affected by a region-wide flood. In the mid 2010s Invercargill's 11 sirens were decommissioned and replaced with a mobile phone text warning system. Residents interested in receiving the warnings had to register.

=== Chatham Islands ===
As of December 2013, the Chatham Islands have three trailer-mounted public address systems that can serve as tsunami warning sirens.

== Standardisation ==
At the request of the Tauranga City Council and Waikato Civil Defence Emergency Management group, in 2013 the Ministry of Civil Defence and Emergency Management decided to standardise the use of tsunami warning sirens. This standard became known as Technical Standard [TS03/14] and standardises the siren signals, the meanings and their "requirements for their operation" across the country.

== Meaning ==
The standard for tsunami warning sirens states that the meaning of the tsunami siren is to "seek further information". Local authorities and Civil Defence Emergency Management groups must give the public sufficient access to the "further information". Sirens that are capable of transmitting voice messages may communicate information about the threat and give instructions.

In December 2013, before standardisation, most Civil Defence Emergency Management groups activated the sirens to mean "Seek further information". In other places with sirens that were capable of conveying voice messages, the sirens meant "Seek further information and/or targeted message". In the Thames-Coromandel District and Christchurch, the sirens meant "Evacuate". In Auckland, Hurunui and the Chatham Islands, the sirens had variable meanings depending on the signal. However, after standardisation, signals can no longer be varied to change the meaning. In Auckland and Hurunui, a "dash dash dot dot" sound meant "Alert", a "dot dot dot dot" sound meant "Evacuate" and a "continuous" sound meant "All-Clear".

== Signals ==
The standard for tsunami warning sirens states that the siren signal is "a multiple tone signal that rises repeatedly with time." It also states that sirens must last longer than 10 minutes, that different signals cannot communicate different meanings and that "the rise and fall signal shall not be used for tsunami warnings".

In December 2013, before standardisation, the most common tsunami signal waveform was a "rise and fall". Other signals included "Repeated rapid rise", "Rising to continuous" and "Dot dot dot dot". In Auckland and Hurunui, a "dash dash dot dot" sound meant "Alert", a "dot dot dot dot" sound meant "Evacuate" and a "continuous" sound meant "All-Clear".

== See also ==
- Emergency Mobile Alert – Mobile phone emergency alerting system in New Zealand
- List of tsunamis affecting New Zealand
- Volcanic Alert Level – New Zealand risk management system
