= List of tsunamis affecting New Zealand =

Tsunamis affect New Zealand's coastline reasonably frequently and tend to be caused by earthquakes on the Pacific plate both locally and as far away as South America, Japan, and Alaska. Some have been attributed to undersea landslides, volcanoes, and at least one meteor strike. New Zealand is affected by at least one tsunami with the a wave height greater than one metre every ten years on average. The history of tsunamis is limited by the country's written history only dating from the early to mid-1800s with Māori oral traditions and paleotsunami research prior to that time. Studies are also being carried out into possible tsunamis on the larger inland lakes, particularly from landslides.

The Pacific plate

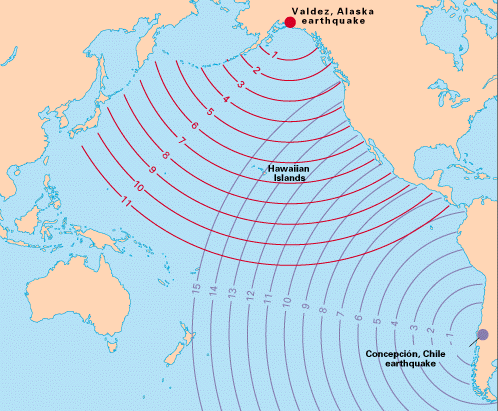
Tsunami travel times (in hours)

== Significant tsunamis (greater than 1 metre) ==
New Zealand's proximity to the Pacific ring of fire means that it is subject tsunamis from numerous earthquakes. Those causing the largest impact on New Zealand tend to come from megaquakes in the Hikurangi Margin, a significant subduction zone.

=== Earthquake ===
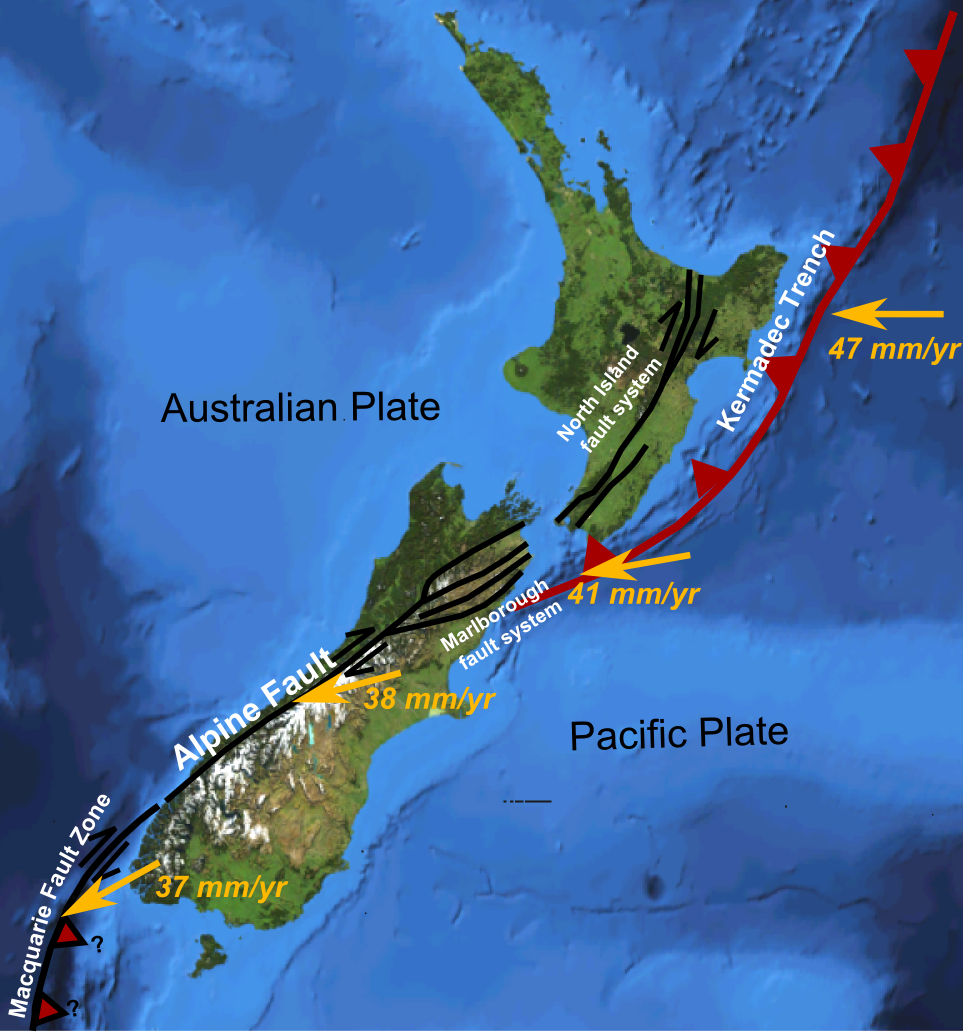
Major active fault zones of New Zealand showing variation in displacement vector of Pacific plate relative to Australian plate along the boundary

==== 880–800 yrs B.P. southern Hikurangi margin ====
Research indicates a tsunami at least 3.3 metres high struck Big Lagoon, near Blenheim, 880–800 yrs Before Present from a megathrust earthquake on the southern Hikurangi Margin of the Pacific plate.

==== 1820s Southland tsunami ====
According to Māori history, several hundred Kāti Māmoe Māori were killed by a tsunami while walking along the beach near Orepuki in the 1820s. They had been gathering fish at the Waiau River mouth in autumn as provisions for the winter period. The beach runs between the sea and a line of cliffs meaning that only a moderate tsunami of 2–4 metres high would have been needed to cause so many deaths. The likely source of the tsunami could have been an earthquake on the Fiordland or Puysegur faults. There are questions around the exact date of this event as it is reliant entirely on unverified unnamed sources.

==== 1826 Fiordland earthquake and tsunami ====
In 1826, sealers in Dusky Sound experienced a large earthquake that had aftershocks that went into the following year. The earthquake descriptions are considered consistent with a 7.6 to 8 magnitude quake given the extent of landslides and uplift. A tsunami or seiche caused by the uplift impacted the area where the sealers were. Its size has not been determined but it must have been significant (greater than 1 metre) to concern the sealers. They thought the small island on which they were residing was going to be swamped. There are questions around the accuracy of the year this event occurred. Given that the earthquake responsible for this tsunami was felt as being violent by the sealers, it is unlikely to be the same tsunami as in the previous section, since in the earlier event was not foreshadowed by noticeable ground shaking.

==== 1855 West Wairarapa ====
The uplift from the earthquake on 23 January 1855 tilted the Wellington Region and with it Wellington Harbour. The eastern side of the harbour moved 80 centimetres higher than the western side displacing the water into the shoreline along Lambton Quay and flooding its houses and shops.

In Cook Strait, there was a much greater displacement. The Remutaka Range had risen about 6 metres and with it, the floor of the strait had been uplifted. The exact maximum height of the tsunami was not known but sheds at Te Kopi, South Wairarapa, which were 8 metres above sea level were destroyed. The area impacted by the tsunami was as far north as Otaki and the upper South Island.

About 20 minutes after the earthquake, a 3-4-metre high tsunami entered Wellington harbour through its narrow entrance and also across the Lyall Bay to Kilbirnie area. The water was about 1 metre deep across the area. Captain Byron Drury, Commander of the sloop HMS Pandora reported:

For eight hours subsequent to the first and great shock, the tide approached and receded from the shore every 20 minutes, rising from eight to ten feet and receding four feet lower than at spring tides. One ship, I heard, was aground at her anchorage four times.

The action of the earthquake and its tsunami destroyed the bridge across the Hutt River. Coasters entering Wellington harbour after the tsunami reported sailing through a large quantity of dead fish – principally ling.

==== 1868 Chile ====
The 1868 Arica earthquake occurred on 13 August 1868, near Arica, then part of Peru, now part of Chile, at 21:30 UTC. The tsunami created by the quake reached New Zealand 15 hours later and caused substantial damage on the Chatham Islands and Banks Peninsula. It also affected many areas along New Zealand's eastern coastline from Great Barrier Island to Bluff. The tide at Wellington and Port Chalmers was reported as rising and falling by over a metre for a space of about 2 hours.

The first area affected was the Chatham Islands, where the tsunami struck at about 1 am (New Zealand time) on 15 August. News of the effect on the Chathams did not reach the mainland until 27 August, when the schooner Rifleman reached Port Chalmers. The Māori village of Tupuangi was totally destroyed, with only sand and seaweed marking its location. Fortunately, the first wave was small enough to awaken the sleeping villagers, enabling them to make it to safety. Subsequent waves carried out the destruction. Captain Anderson lost his house, which was about four miles from Tupuangi, but he and his family were able to reach safety. A Māori drowned while trying to save Captain Anderson's boat, which had come adrift. Thomas Hay, a sheep farmer, lost all he had. Buildings at Waitangi were damaged, including Beamish's accommodation house and the Government store.

At about 4 am, Mr Webb, a Canterbury railway night watchman at Lyttelton, noticed the barque John Knox was lying on her broadside and nearly touching the jetty she was discharging her cargo on. He woke her captain, Jenkins, who noticed that Lyttelton Harbour between the wharf and Officers Point was dry. Minutes later, there was a thundering noise from the direction of Officers Point, and they saw an enormous wave powering along the harbour. The power and ferocity of the wave snapped a number of boats warps, snapped the John Knox's mooring chain and drove her into the jetty, dragged the ketch Margaret into the harbour where she fouled the schooner Annie Brown, damaged the schooner Jeanie Duncan and the steamer Novelty. The tide kept rising and falling in the harbour for some hours after the initial wave. The tsunami that entered the harbour has been estimated at 7 metres high but Captain Jenkins had referred to the wave as being 8 feet (2.5 metres) high when he saw it.

The bays around Banks Peninsula were also impacted by the tsunami, which penetrated far inland along valleys, damaging homes and carrying away bridges and fences. The ketch Georgina was wrecked at Rhodes Bay. At Pigeon Bay a succession of waves reaching up to two metres above the highest high water mark between 3am and 1pm carried away two jetties, 40,000 feet of sawn timber, a boat house, fencing, and the ketch Courier.

A 1.5-metre-high wave washed up the Waimakariri River at about 3am, snapping the stern line on the SS Gazelle, which caused her to swing around. The schooner Challenge broke away from her wharf and collided with the Gazelle. The William and Julia were lifted onto the riverbank and the Nora and Dart broke free from their wharf.

After the tsunami, Ferdinand von Hochstetter undertook a detailed analysis of the tsunami. He charted its progress across the Pacific Ocean, determining wave speeds and the ocean depth along several paths. It was the first detailed scientific analysis of a major tsunami. Julius von Haast, a friend of von Hochstetter and fellow geologist, writing to the Star two days after the tsunami reached New Zealand, pointed out that such waves travel at great speed and travel thousands of miles in a day.

In 1912, the Evening Post carried a letter that suggested Westport had been submerged under a 10-metre-high wave, with the old township now lying metres under the sea. This story was later modified in the Colonist by its writer to being associated with the Arica earthquake with the sea at Westport receding some 7–8 metres and a returning wave of much less significance. The original claims were repeated in a 2015 paper by Professor James Goff, of the University of New South Wales. The Westport Times made no mention of the event in August 1868, other than the impact on other parts of New Zealand.

==== 1868 east of New Zealand ====
A few days after the Arica tidal wave arrived on 17 August 1868, there was a sharp earthquake, felt at both Nelson and Wellington at 9:57 and 9:56 am respectively. Both harbours reported tidal waves with the one at Nelson over-topping the Boulder Bank. The wave was estimated to be just over a metre in height. The paper also reported that the tidal wave had impacted numerous South Island ports. The earthquake was felt at Christchurch at 10:01 am. Later reports indicated that the quake was felt almost simultaneously from Napier to Port Chalmers.

==== 1877 Iquique ====
On 10 May 1877 at 0:59 UTC, a magnitude 8.5 earthquake occurred near Iquique, Peru (now Chile). The resulting tsunami reached New Zealand's eastern coastline between 7 and 8 am NZDT on 11 May. The wave had a reported 1–2-metre height in most places and impacted the coast from the Bay of Islands to Bluff. It also reached Westport on the West Coast at 2:30 pm. At Akaroa and Gisborne the wave was in the 2–3-metre range. The waves at Port Charles on the Coromandel Peninsula were reported to be over 3 metres high.

With the knowledge gained from the 1868 tsunami, newspapers of the day were already speculating that the source of the wave was from a South American earthquake. Their hypothesis was confirmed a couple of days later when news of the Iquique earthquake reached New Zealand.

==== 1913 Westport ====
On 22 February 1913 a 1 metre high tsunami followed a local magnitude 6.8 earthquake. Newspapers at the time seem to indicate a very limited impact to the tidal portion of the Buller River.

==== 1929 Whitecliffs, Karamea ====
On 17 June 1929, a 2.5-metre-high tsunami was generated by the magnitude 7.8 Murchison earthquake.

==== 1931 Napier ====
The earthquake triggered a landslip at Waikare which in turn caused a localised 15.3-metre tsunami. At Napier, there was a tsunami of about 3 metres.

==== 1946 Aleutian Islands ====
A 1 metre high tsunami was said to have reached Northland from the Aleutian Island earthquake.

==== 1947 Gisborne ====
===== 26 March =====
On 26 March 1947 at 8:32 am NZST, Gisborne had what felt like a minor earthquake. Within 30 minutes, the coast from Muriwai to Tolaga Bay experienced a tsunami which peaked at 10 metres high at Turihaua. At Tatapouri Point, four people at the nearby hotel escaped by getting to high ground. Two waves drove through the hotel ground floor at up to windowsill height and a number of small buildings were washed away. Two men in a cottage at Turihaua were swept inland onto the coast road. The cottage was totally destroyed, except for the kitchen they were in. Other damage included the Pouawa River bridge, which was swept 600 metres inland, a house at Te Mahanga Beach which was swept off its piles, and six hectares of pumpkins at Murphy's Beach. No one was killed. The quake that caused the tsunami was 7-7.1 magnitude off-shore near Poverty Bay.

===== 17 May =====
On 17 May 1947, another tsunami hit the coast between Gisborne and Tolaga Bay with a maximum height of 6 metres north of Gisborne. Again, there were no casualties. Also, the impact of this tsunami was less than earlier one because it occurred near low tide. The earthquake responsible for it was a 6.9-7.1 magnitude quake offshore near Tolaga Bay.

==== 1960 Chile ====
A tsunami generated by the Mw 9.5 Valdivia earthquake of 23 May 1960, 7:11 pm (NZST) was reported at more than 120 locations in New Zealand during the early morning. As with the other earlier 1868 and 1877 Chilean tsunamis the eastern coast of New Zealand from Cape Reinga to Stewart Island was impacted. More unusually, effects of the tsunami were also observed on the west coast of both islands, including Ahipara, Whanganui, Paremata, Nelson, Motueka, and several West Coast (South Island) towns. At the Chatham Islands and Campbell Island, water heights above sea level ranged from 3 metres to over 5 metres. Surprisingly, the tsunami did not affect New Plymouth, Foxton, or Himatangi Beach. The largest and most damaging waves were generally within 12 to 15 hours after the first ones although some were within the first 2–4 hours.

The Pacific Tsunami Warning Center alerted New Zealand authorities of the approaching tsunami prompting the first major tsunami evacuation in New Zealand. Port facilities along the east coast of New Zealand were cleared, schools in coastal areas closed and Whitianga, Mercury Bay, Waihi Beach, Whakatāne, Ōhope, Ōpōtiki and Kaikōura evacuated.

==== 2009 Fiordland ====
Tsunami warnings were issued soon after the earthquake by authorities in New Zealand and Australia, as well as the Pacific Tsunami Warning Center in Hawaii. Civil defence officials in Southland also issued a 'potential tsunami' warning, stating their concerns about widely varying measurements of the earthquake. Reacting to the Pacific warnings, about fifty residents and tourists on Lord Howe Island were evacuated, and in Sydney a theatre in Bondi Beach was evacuated, and residents told to keep away from the shore. the tsunami reached a height of 1 metre in Jackson Bay, 25 cm at Charleston, 12 cm at Dog Island, 14 cm at Port Kembla, and 6 cm at Spring Bay. The tsunami warnings were subsequently cancelled or reduced.

==== 2010 Chile ====
CDEM reported wave activity of 50 cm (1.6 ft) in the Chatham Islands, and 2 m (6 ft 7 in) surges were reported there later in the morning. A surge 2.2 m (7 ft 3 in) high hit the South Island's Banks Peninsula, while surges up to 1 m (3 ft 3 in) high were reported in the northern North Island.

==== 2016 Kaikōura ====
A tsunami, caused by the Kaikōura earthquake, of 2.5 m (8 ft) was said to have been recorded at Kaikōura. An investigation revealed that the tsunami was 1 metre high at the nearest recording point. At Little Pigeon Bay on Banks Peninsula, the tsunami reached 4.1 metres above sea level, extensively damaging an unoccupied beachside cottage. It also travelled 140 metres up a creek adjacent to the cottage.

=== Landslide ===
Sonar mapping has found the presence of massive submarine landslides near the New Zealand coast that would have triggered large localised tsunamis. Researchers from GNS Science and the University of Newcastle (Australia) have said modelling of some of these landslides that occurred in the Tasman Sea offshore between one and five millions years CE could have potentially caused 70 metre high tsunami's along the coast of west coast of the North Island.

==== 1927–1928 Tolaga Bay ====
Three large waves greater than 4 metres high over the period 1927 to 1928. Possibly landslip related.

==== 1987 Doubtful Sound ====
A 3-metre-high localised tsunami was caused by a landslide into Deep Cove, Doubtful Sound in May 1987.

==== 2003 Charles Sound ====
During the magnitude 7 earthquake on 23 August, a significant landslide swept in to Charles Sound causing a 4 to 5 metres high tsunami that damaged a wharf and helipad in the Sound. This tsunami from this landslide was localised to several hundred metres of coastline. There was also a small tsunami caused by the deformation of the coast recorded 190 km away at Jackson Bay of 0.3 metres and at Port Kembla, New South Wales of 0.17 metres.

=== Volcano ===
==== 234 Taupo ====
Although an inland eruption, the Taupo eruption is considered to have caused an atmospheric pressure wave of sufficient magnitude to cause a tsunami. Radiocarbon dating of prehistoric tsunami in the Cook Strait area indicates a possible correlation with one such event.

==== 1360 Healy ====
There is evidence of a tsunami in the Bay of Plenty from the Healy volcanic eruption.

==== 1883 Krakatoa ====
The Krakatoa eruption generated a meteotsunami of up to 2 metres high on the New Zealand coast.

==== 2022 Hunga Tonga ====
A combination of a cyclone surge from Cyclone Cody and the tsunami caused extensive damage at a marina in Tutukaka in New Zealand. The waves pulled boats away from their moorings, taking some out into the bay and smashing some together, as well as damaging the structures at the marina. About eight to ten boats were completely sunken, with the total damage estimated to be worth millions of dollars. According to Hauraki Gulf Weather, the tsunami struck on 16 January 2022 at between 01:05 and 01:10 local time on Great Barrier Island with a height of 1.33 m (4 ft 4 in). The tsunami caused flooding at Mahinepua Bay, where a campsite was located; all 50 individuals at the site were safe. A group of people fishing in Hokianga Harbour had to run for their lives to escape the waves, and reported having to drive through water over 1 m (3 ft 3 in) deep. Unusual waves were recorded in Port Taranaki in New Plymouth. They lasted 24 hours, with the largest having a peak-to-peak height of 1 m (3 ft 3 in) at 08:30 local time. There were no casualties reported in New Zealand.

=== Meteor ===
==== Chicxulub ====
The Chicxulub asteroid impact near the Yucatán Peninsula is postulated to have produced a global tsunami 30,000 times greater than those produced by recent earthquakes. The asteroid is believed to have struck at the end of the Cretaceous period, 66.043 ± 0.011 Ma. Evidence of the tsunami is said to be found in olistostrome deposits at the top of the Upper Cretaceous Whangi Formation on the southeast corner of North Island and northeast corner of South Island.

==== Eltanin ====
The Eltanin impact meteor impacted in the eastern part of the South Pacific Ocean dated to the late Pliocene 2.51 ± 0.07 million years ago and was believed to have caused a significant mega-tsunami along New Zealand's coastline.

==== Mahuika ====
There is disputed historic evidence that a mega-tsunami with a wave height of greater than 30 metres could have struck Stewart Island in the 15th century. This has been attributed to a meteor impact. The debunked pseudohistorian Gavin Menzies connected this event to a Chinese exploration fleet in 1422.

=== Unknown cause ===
==== 200, 800, and 1600 East Coast, North Island ====
A study of Puatai Beach on the East Coast of the North Island in 2016 identified three or four large tsunamis with waves between 9 and 12 metres had impacted the East Coast. While they are likely to have been from earthquakes, the exact cause and timing has yet to be determined.

==== 1320–1450 Western Waikato ====
A tsunami event sometime between 1320 and 1450 is believed to have impacted 150 km of the Western Waikato coastline. It is suspected to have been caused by a submarine slope failure of the Aotea Seamount which is located about 240 km west of Raglan. Evidence of the tsunami came from marine gravel deposits at 32 sites north along the coast from Awakino. However, a study published in 2016 says, "it is very difficult to reconcile the geologic evidence presented by Goff and Chagué-Goff (2015) suggestive of 30 to 60 m tsunami runup heights along the coast of south west Waikato with numerical modelling of potential tsunami source".

A Māori legend called "Coming of the Sand" from the New Plymouth area describes possibly a tsunami inundating the inland area and depositing it with a thick layer of sand.

==== 1470–1510 South Taranaki Bight ====
The tsunami that occurred between 1470 and 1510 was associated with the South Taranaki Bight possibly extended down to Abel Tasman National Park. Evidence of this tsunami came from D'Urville and Kapiti Islands, and Waitori in South Taranaki

==== 1500s ====
Māori moved their settlements from low-lying coastal areas inland and onto hill tops. The cause of this change in settlement pattern is believed to have been tsunamis. Archaeological examination of the coastal settlements shows tsunami damage in many places.

==== 1800s ====
In what is believed to have been the early 1800s, Moawhitu, a Māori village on D'Urville Island was wiped out by, in Māori oral traditions, a large wave which is now presumed to have been a tsunami. This event is undated.

==== 1924 Chatham Islands ====
On 19 July 1924 about 7:15 pm (NZMT), the northern and eastern side of Chatham Island and Pitt Island were struck by a series of waves that reached 6 metres above the high-water mark. The waves reached 100 metres inland at Kaingaroa destroying a dam and two trawlers. At Wharekauri, a bridge was badly damaged, and fences washed away. Te Awanui island was inundated and at Owenga several boats and some shell crushing machinery was damaged. A small hut was also washed away. On Pitt Island, the wharf was destroyed and on Mangere Island there was a large landslide. The source of the tsunami is unknown, it could have been caused by either a landslide or an unidentified earthquake. The Chatham Islands steam ship Tees was struck on its starboard side by the wave at 9:30 am and almost capsized. There was a sudden change in the weather due to the arrival of a southerly storm on the east coast of New Zealand on the day of the tsunami that may have masked its effect.

== Minor tsunamis (less than 1 metre) from significant earthquakes ==
There have been numerous minor tsunamis caused by significant large earthquakes. Examples of these are the 1848 Lower Wairau Valley quake, 1922 Vallenar earthquake, 1922 Rangiora quake, 1923 Kanto quake, 1950 Bay of Plenty quake, 1952 Severo-Kurilsk earthquake, 1964 Alaska earthquake, 1976 Kermadecs, 1977 Tongo, 1981 Maquare Ridge, 1982 and 1986 Kermadecs, 1994 Kuril Islands earthquake, 1995 Kobe, 1998 Papua New Guinea earthquake, 2001 southern Peru earthquake, 2004 Tasman Sea earthquake, 2011 Tohoku earthquake and tsunami, 2021 Kermadec Islands earthquake, and 2025 Kamchatka Peninsula earthquake.

The effect of the 1923 Kanto earthquake was reported in local newspapers as abnormal tides on 5 September. The 1952 Severo-Kurilsk tsunami reached New Zealand with a wave height of just under 1 metre.

== Mitigation measures and early warning systems ==
There is evidence that Māori abandoned numerous coastal settlements in the 1500s in favour of inland or hilltop sites. It has been suggested that this movement was caused by tsunamis. Initial European settlement was unaware of the tsunami danger until the 1868 and 1877 tsunamis. No warning systems became available until after the 1946 Aleutian earthquake when the National Oceanic and Atmospheric Administration Pacific Tsunami Warning Centre was established in 1949. New Zealand became a member of the centre and receives warnings of tsunamis caused by distant earthquakes.

The Pacific Tsunami Warning and Mitigation System was established in 1965 due to the 1960 Chile tsunami. New Zealand is one of the 46 member countries.

Tsunamis from these may arrive within a few minutes and this is not enough time for GeoNet to locate the event, determine if it could produce a tsunami, and notify the Ministry of Civil Defence and Emergency Management who issue the warnings. On 2 September 2016 Civil Defence took over an hour to warn of a potential tsunami from a 7.1 magnitude earthquake centred 125 km north-east of Te Araroa prompting calls for the warning system to be improved.

Differing approaches to tsunami warning sirens are taken on a regional level. For example, there are over 200 tsunami sirens in Northland, whereas there are no tsunami warning sirens in the Wellington Region due to its vulnerability to local-source tsunami, which can render the sirens ineffective.

In addition, New Zealand, at the time of the 2004 Indian Ocean earthquake and tsunami, did not have sea-based tsunami warning devices. Since then, 20 sites have been selected and gauges are now installed at most of them.

Further complicating matters is the Pacific Tsunami Warning Centre's ocean-based, tsunami warning devices are focused on protecting Alaska, Hawaii, and the United States Pacific coastline. This means that there is a gap in the Southern Ocean. Australia installed a DART buoy in the south-east Tasman Sea which helped cover that area. There are now twelve DART buoys in the southwestern Pacific Ocean to focusing on the Hikurangi, Kermadec, Tonga, and Vanuatu (formerly New Hebrides) trenches. There are no New Zealand DART buoys in the Tasman Sea or to the south of New Zealand.

=== Blue line project ===
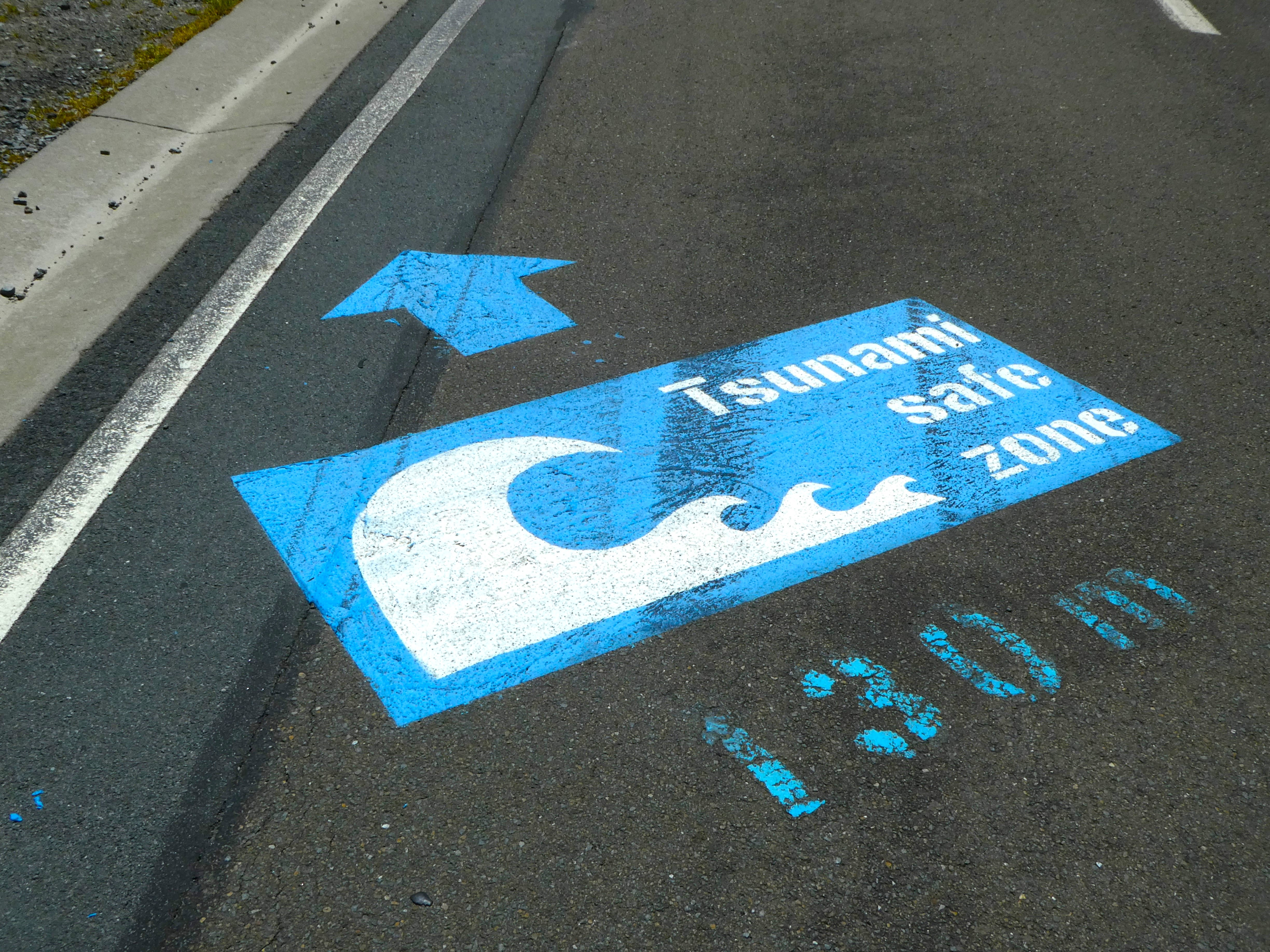
A tsunami safe zone road marking in Wellington

Wellington was the first place to paint blue lines on its roadways to indicate the limit of potential tsunami hazards. The project won the International Association of Emergency Managers Global and Oceania Public Awareness categories at the Associations annual awards. The project evoked international interest.

== See also ==
- List of earthquakes in New Zealand
- Tsunami sirens in New Zealand
