= GeoNet (New Zealand) =

Natural hazards monitoring system

- Website type: Natural hazards monitoring
- Country of origin: New Zealand
- Founders: GNS Science; Earthquake Commission; Land Information New Zealand
- Website: geonet.org.nz
- Commercial: No
- Launched: 2001; 25 years ago

GeoNet is a natural hazards monitoring system in New Zealand that monitors earthquakes, large landslides, volcanoes, tsunami, and movement of land. Earthquakes and other natural hazards are automatically listed on the GeoNet website and app, and app users are given natural hazard warning notifications. GeoNet was founded in 2001 by GNS Science, the Earthquake Commission and Land Information New Zealand.

== Monitoring ==
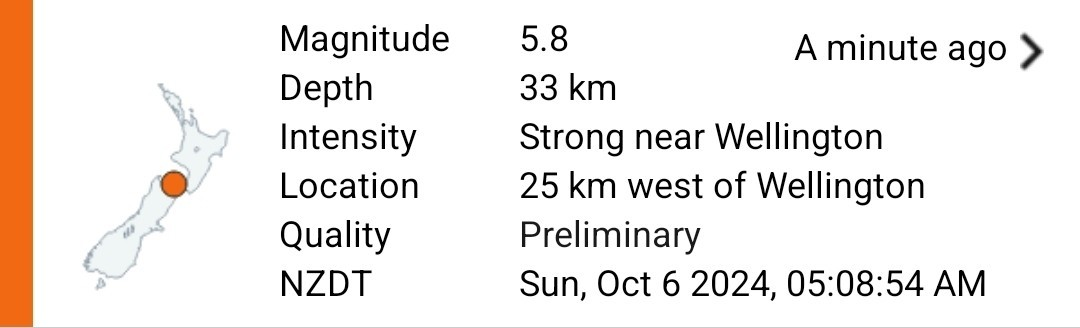
An earthquake listing one minute after the earthquake occurred

GeoNet monitors earthquakes, large landslides, volcanoes, tsunami, and movement of land. This monitoring is done using over 1,000 instruments across the country, with data being transmitted from its sensors to GNS Science's computers in Wellington and Wairākei. GeoNet also forecasts earthquake aftershocks for major earthquakes, such as the 2016 Kaikōura earthquake. On average, the monitoring system detects over 20,000 earthquakes per year. Detected earthquakes that pass a certain threshold are automatically listed on the GeoNet website. The GeoNet app sends notifications about natural hazards to its users. An example of this is the 2016 Kaikōura earthquake, where the app had sent a total of over 109 million notifications within two days. GeoNet also posts about natural hazards on their social media pages, which are followed by over 200,000 people as of January 2020.

Earthquakes are listed with intensities, ranging from "weak" to "extreme". There is also an "unnoticeable" intensity; there have been cases where thousands of people have reported feeling an "unnoticeable" earthquake, such as in August 2026. GeoNet responded by stating that "Unfortunately, the word for the least amount of shaking felt is 'unnoticeable' which is described as 'barely sensed, only felt by a few people'. We are looking into this wording."

== History ==
GeoNet was founded in 2001 by GNS Science, the Earthquake Commission and Land Information New Zealand. Its website was launched on 20 May 2002. GeoNet was "relatively [obscure]" until the 2010 and 2011 Christchurch earthquakes occurred, when people started paying attention to the monitoring system. Within six days of the 2010 earthquake, the website was viewed 564 million times. In December 2016 GeoNet was given a funding boost of up to $3 million to improve its monitoring of and responses to natural hazards. This followed criticism of the country's response to the 2016 Kaikōura earthquake, especially the time it took for a tsunami alert to be issued.

In January 2019 an earthquake occurred in the Kermadec Islands and another occurred a few minutes later in Whanganui. Because it takes a few minutes for the seismic waves to travel to the mainland, the monitoring system detected the two earthquakes at the same time, causing it to incorrectly detect a magnitude 6 earthquake in the East Coast. Similar errors occurred in 2012 and in 2025. GeoNet stopped displaying these errors in 2019 when experts started having to manually approve earthquake listings, but during the COVID-19 pandemic (in the early 2020s) this approval requirement was removed and automatic earthquake listings resumed.

In 2023, GeoNet introduced a "shaking layers" map. Rather than showing squares at the locations of felt reports, it shows the median shaking at a given location. This includes locations where no one has submitted a felt report, and avoids showing possible false reports. In February 2026 three new map designs were added to GeoNet: "satellite imagery, topographic terrain, and greyscale maps". Users can switch between the map options. In August 2026 they announced that they were about to launch a beta test for a new GeoNet website. The new website design was launched in October 2026.

== Felt reports ==
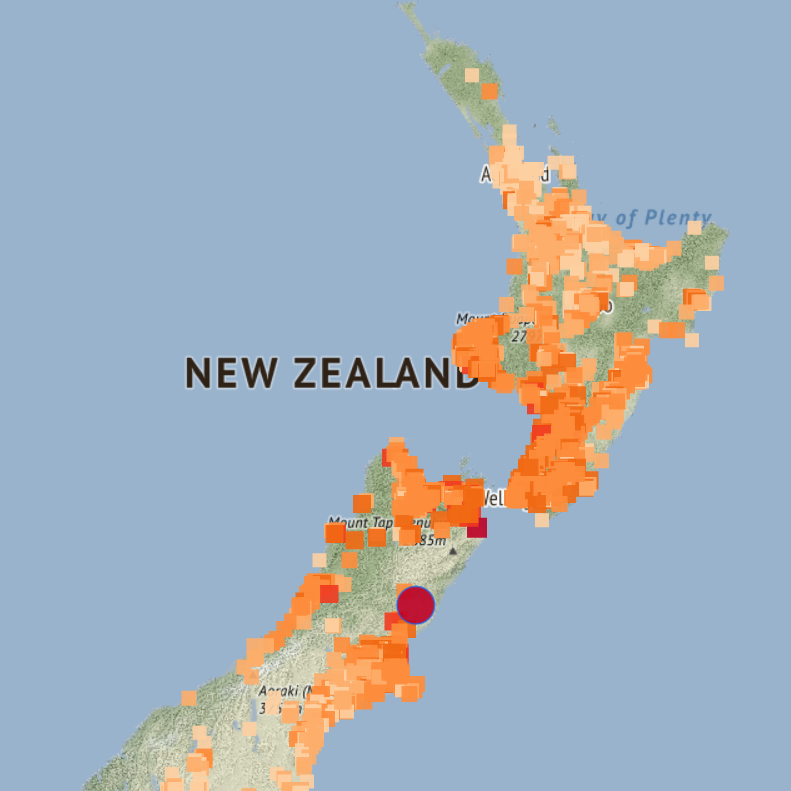
A felt report map for the 2016 Kaikōura earthquake. Power outages resulted in a lack of felt reports near Kaikōura.

The GeoNet website allows users to submit earthquake felt reports and to describe the intensity of the shaking. After the report is submitted, a coloured square is placed on a map, at the user's location. Additionally, users can choose to submit a "detailed" felt report which consists of 40 questions. Most submissions are genuine, although some people make false reports, either on purpose or by mistake. VPNs can cause the website incorrectly retrieve the user's location. Users sometimes enter the correct name of their suburb, but in the wrong city. Aucklanders have a reputation for describing small earthquakes, including ones that cannot be felt in Auckland, as having "strong" or "extreme" shaking. Users occasionally attempt to draw images on the map using the coloured squares, including what GeoNet has described as "a certain appendage". The felt reports have a time limit, meaning that after a certain time following an earthquake, new reports will not be recorded.

Shortly after a large earthquake, Civil Defence may use the felt reports to gather information, such as power and communications outages, before the agency can gather information from other sources. An example of this is after the 2016 Kaikōura earthquake, where there the lack of felt reports in Kaikōura suggested that there were power outages there. From 2004 to 2016, over one million earthquake felt reports were submitted. Earthquakes are not the only felt reports that the website receives—users can also submit reports of tsunami, with over 17,000 reports by 2020. The earthquake with the most felt reports on GeoNet had a magnitude of 6.0 and was located north-west of Paraparaumu, which gathered 60,688 felt reports in 2023.

== See also ==
- Emergency Mobile Alert – Mobile phone emergency alerting system in New Zealand
- Tsunami sirens in New Zealand
