= Raymond Queree =

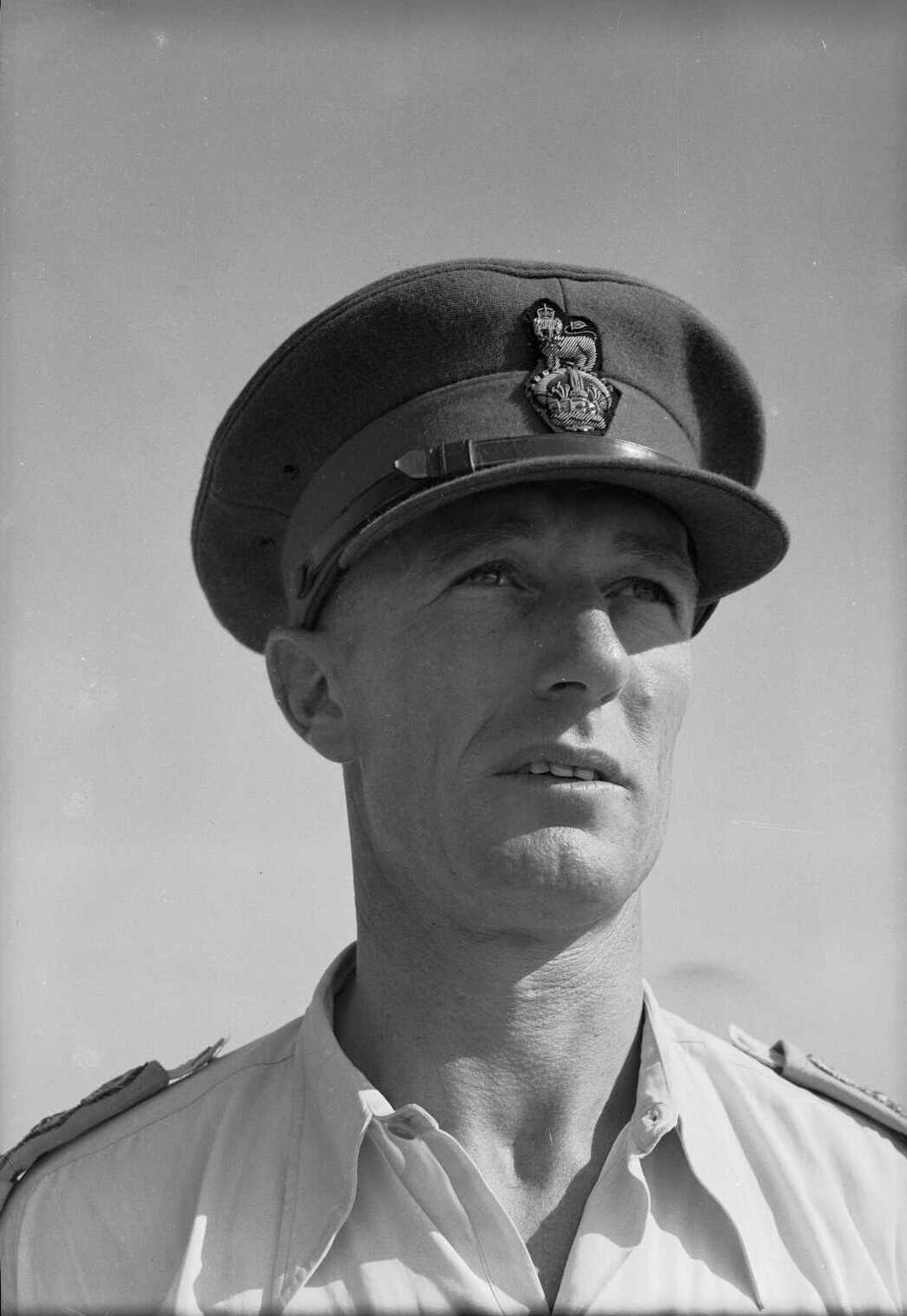
- Born: 28 June 1909; Christchurch, New Zealand
- Died: 18 October 1975 (aged 66); Wellington, New Zealand
- Military career
- Allegiance: New Zealand
- Branch: New Zealand Army
- Service years: 1929–64
- Rank: Brigadier
- Commands: New Zealand Divisional Artillery; 4th Field Regiment
- Conflicts: Second World War; Battle of Greece; Battle of Crete; North African campaign; Italian campaign; Korean War
- Awards: Commander of the Order of the British Empire; Distinguished Service Order; Mentioned in Despatches (3)
- Other work: Director of Civil Defence

Brigadier Raymond Candlish Queree, CBE, DSO (28 June 1909 – 18 October 1975) was a senior officer in the New Zealand Military Forces during the Second World War and the postwar period.

Born in Christchurch, Queree was commissioned into the New Zealand Staff Corps in 1929 following graduation from the Royal Military College at Sandhurst. He transferred to the Royal New Zealand Artillery in 1935. During the Second World War, he commanded the 4th Field Regiment during the North African campaign and was later a staff officer in the headquarters of the 2nd New Zealand Division. He was commander of the divisional artillery during the final stages of the Italian campaign. He held a series of important staff posts in the period after the war, retiring from the military in 1964. He was subsequently director of New Zealand's Civil Defence agency.

== Early life ==
Raymond Candlish Queree was born in Christchurch, New Zealand, on 28 June 1909 and was educated at Christchurch Boys' High School, where he was a member of the school's Cadet Corps. He was awarded a cadetship at the Royal Military College at Sandhurst in the United Kingdom, completing the two year course of study in 1929. Commissioned in the New Zealand Staff Corps, he was seconded to the British Army for a year, holding the rank of second lieutenant.

Queree returned to New Zealand in 1931 where he was an instructor at Trentham Military Camp and then, in 1935, transferred to the Royal New Zealand Artillery (RNZA). He held a series of staff positions in the RNZA and then went to Australia to attend the School of Artillery in Sydney.

== Second World War ==
Queree was attending a field gunnery staff course in Britain at the time of the outbreak of the Second World War. Returning to New Zealand, he was seconded to the 2nd New Zealand Expeditionary Force, being raised for service in the war. A major at the time, he was commander of the 5th Field Regiment during its training at Hopuhopu Camp and was then made second-in-command of the 7th Anti-Tank Regiment. He departed New Zealand with the 2nd echelon of the 2nd New Zealand Division, originally headed for the Middle East but diverted to the United Kingdom following the entry of Italy into the conflict. While in England, he was appointed brigade major of the Divisional Artillery, as part of the headquarters of Brigadier Reginald Miles.

By early 1941, the 2nd echelon had arrived in the Middle East and preparations were underway for the 2nd New Zealand Division to be transported to Greece. Queree served throughout the short-lived campaign in Greece and during the subsequent Battle of Crete. Prior to the commencement of the fighting on Crete he was attached as a staff officer to Creforce headquarters, commanded by Major General Bernard Freyberg. He was wounded on 27 May, the only casualty amongst the RNZA staff officers present on Crete.

In June 1942, Queree became commander of the 4th Field Regiment after its original commander was transferred to the 3rd New Zealand Division, being raised for service in the Pacific following the entry of the Empire of Japan into the war. He led the regiment through the fighting at Minqar Qaim and the subsequent First Battle of El Alamein. In September he was made the chief of staff (GSOI) of the 2nd New Zealand Division; during his work in this role he was considered to be "master of detail". He was subsequently made an Officer in the Order of the British Empire.

When the New Zealand Corps was formed for the Battle of Monte Cassino, he was Brigadier General Staff. In June 1944, he took command of the 5th Field Regiment and shortly afterwards was made commander of the divisional artillery. He was heavily involved in the artillery planning for the later stages of the Italian campaign. He had already been made a Commander in the Order of the British Empire in late 1944 and by the end of hostilities in Europe had been mentioned in despatches three times. He was subsequently awarded the Distinguished Service Order.

== Post-war service ==
After the war, Queree attended the Staff College at Camberley for general staff officer training. He was appointed Quartermaster-General in 1948 and in this capacity helped with the formation of Kayforce, the New Zealand contribution to the United Nations war effort in Korea. He went to the Imperial Defence College during this time. Commander of the Central Military District from 1953 to 1954, he was then appointed Adjutant-General, serving a term of six years in this role. For a portion of this period he was also Vice Chief of General Staff. His final posting was as the head of the New Zealand Army Liaison Staff, based in London. This ended when he retired from the New Zealand Army in 1964.

In 1953, Queree was awarded the Queen Elizabeth II Coronation Medal.

== Later life ==
The year after his retirement from the military, Queree was appointed the Director of Civil Defence. During his time in charge of the department, he had to deal with the Wahine ferry disaster and also the 1968 Inangahua earthquake. He retired as director of Civil Defence in 1970. He retained a connection to the RNZA, being its colonel commandant from 1968 to 1970. He died in Wellington on 18 October 1975.
