= Jawsh 685 =

New Zealander beat maker & music producer

- Also known as: Joshua Stylah
- Born: Joshua Christian Nanai; 4 November 2002 (age 24); Auckland, New Zealand
- Genre: Siren jam
- Occupation: Record producer
- Years active: 2019–present
- Label: Columbia

Joshua Christian Nanai (born 4 November 2002), better known as Jawsh 685, is a New Zealand music producer. While studying at Manurewa High School in South Auckland, he made his breakthrough with "Savage Love (Laxed – Siren Beat)", a siren jam single with American singer Jason Derulo in 2020, which reached number one in over 15 countries, including the United Kingdom, Canada, Australia and New Zealand. A remix featuring South Korean boy band BTS pushed the song to number one in United States.

== Early life and career ==
Nanai was born and raised in South Auckland, and currently lives in Manurewa. He is of Pacific Islander descent: half-Samoan and half-Cook Islander. The "685" in his stage name refers to the calling code for Samoa. He became the first Pasifika and the third New Zealander ever to top the UK Singles Chart.

== Discography ==
=== Singles ===
List of singles with selected chart positions
Title	Year	Peak chart positions											Certifications	Album
Title	Year	NZ	NZ Hot	AUS	AUT	BEL	CAN	GER	SWE	SWI	UK	US	Certifications	Album
"Laxed (Siren Beat)"	2020	—	6	—	—	—	—	—	107	—	—	—		Non-album singles
"Savage Love (Laxed – Siren Beat)" (with Jason Derulo)	2020	1	1	1	1	1	1	1	1	1	1	1	RMNZ: 2× Platinum; ARIA: 4× Platinum; BEA: Platinum; BPI: Platinum; BVMI: 2× Platinum; GLF: 2× Platinum; IFPI AUT: Platinum; RIAA: 4× Platinum	Non-album singles
"Sweet & Sour" (featuring Lauv and Tyga)	2020	8	1	—	—	—	—	—	89	—	—	—	RMNZ: Gold	Non-album singles
"Savage Love (Laxed – Siren Beat)" (BTS remix) (with Jason Derulo and BTS)	2020	—	—	—	—	—	2	—	—	—	—	1		Non-album singles
"Make Me Happy" (with Jason Derulo)	2024	—	7	—	—	—	—	—	—	—	—	—		TBA
"Light it Up" (with Sean Rii)	2024	—	—	—	—	—	—	—	—	—	—	—		TBA
"—" denotes a recording that did not chart or was not released in that territory.

== Awards and nominations ==
Award	Year (Note: Indicates the year of ceremony.)	Recipient(s) and nominee(s)	Category	Result	Ref.
Gaon Chart Music Awards	2021	"Savage Love (Laxed – Siren Beat) (BTS Remix)" (with Jason Derulo and BTS)	Song of the Year – October	Nominated	
iHeartRadio Music Awards	2021	"Savage Love (Laxed – Siren Beat)" (with Jason Derulo)	TikTok Bop of the Year	Nominated	
Melon Music Awards	2020	"Savage Love (Laxed – Siren Beat) (BTS Remix)" (with Jason Derulo and BTS)	Best Pop	Nominated	
