= Siren kings =

Pasifika subculture in New Zealand

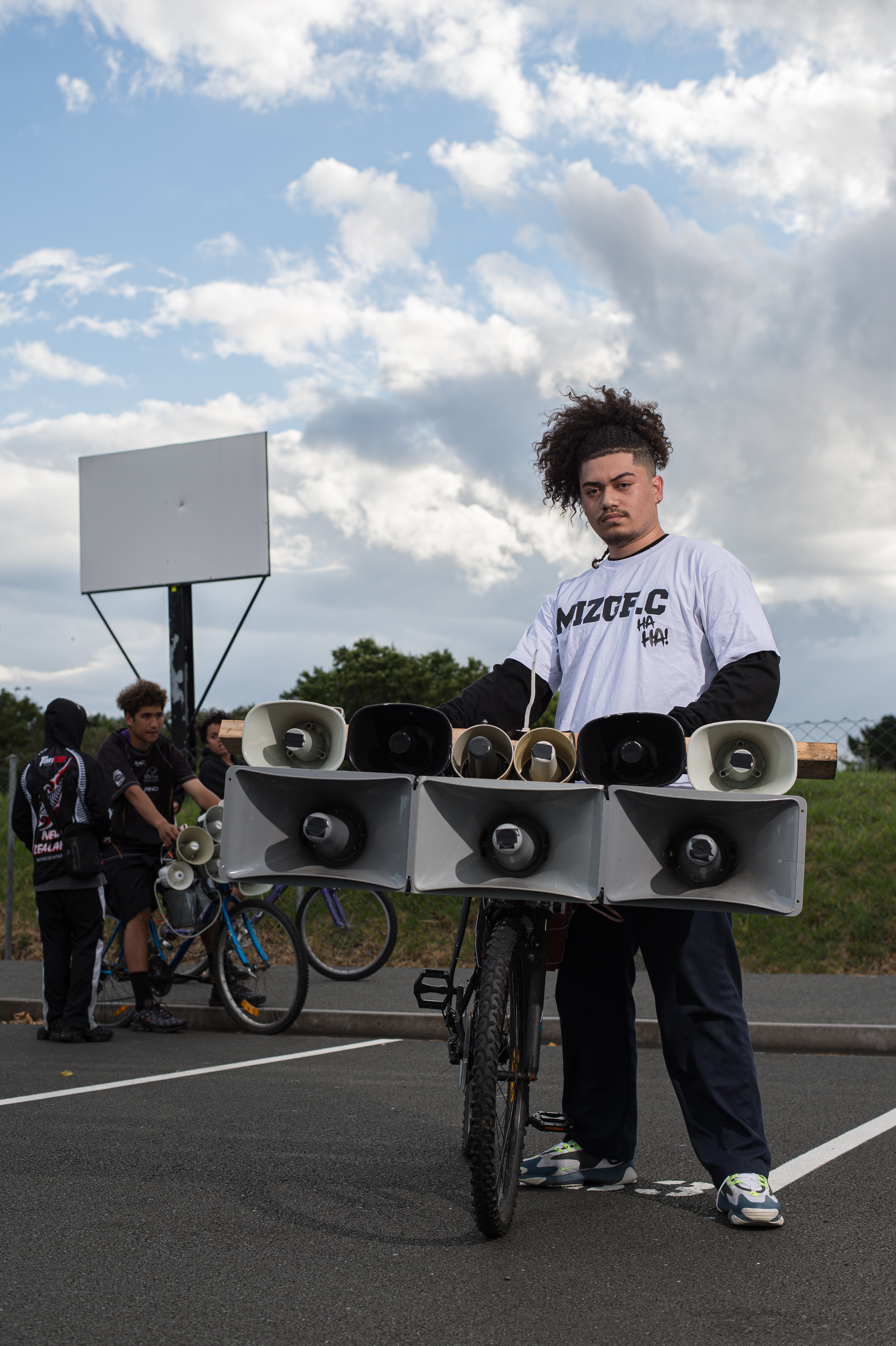
Siren beat producer Mizgf.C, standing with his modified bicycle, used in siren battles

Siren kings are members of a primarily Pasifika underground youth subculture, originating in South Auckland, which gained popularity in the mid-2010s. The siren scene involves competitions where crews compete for the loudest and clearest sound produced by sirens (loudspeakers or public address systems) stolen from schools, tsunami risk zones and industrial sites, then attached to cars or bicycles, to win the title of siren king. Māngere is considered to be the birthplace of the siren king culture, with the Te Atatū Peninsula a bastion in West Auckland. The subculture exists mostly within Auckland but has also spread to Metropolitan Wellington, within its heavily Pasifika district of Porirua.

The music produced to be used in siren battles is known as siren beats or siren jams, and is typically music played at high volumes, inspired by reggae and dembow that emphasises treble. In 2020, siren beat producer and high school student Jawsh 685's song "Laxed (Siren Beat)" became popular on TikTok, later becoming a global hit when sampled by American singer Jason Derulo, released as "Savage Love (Laxed – Siren Beat)".

== History ==
The origins of the siren scene are the early 2000s in South Auckland, New Zealand, primarily among Pasifika youth. The scene grew from car owners adding stolen car battery-powered speaker systems to cars (known as "stacking"), and in 2010 battles between different siren crews began in public areas. During this time, bicycle use began to be popular among youth members of the siren scene. Popular locations for battles include carparks and reserves around Henderson, Avondale, the Onehunga shoreline and Māngere.

By the mid-2010s, siren kings received strong police and community scrutiny, with reports of loudspeakers and fire alarms being stolen from schools, fire stations and community centres, Police reports to media also associated siren battles as being associated with gangs. Due to police raids and attention, members of the siren crews began to carry large numbers of receipts for sirens, either in pockets or placed on car dashboards.

Many members of suburban Auckland communities express frustration at the noise created by siren battles. In 2019, the Auckland Council created barriers to close off an Auckland public reserve at night time, however this was ineffective at stopping siren battles from taking place.

Siren kings featured prominently in Pasifika photographer Edith Amituanai's 2019 exhibition Double Take, shown at the Adam Art Gallery in Wellington. In 2021, a half-hour documentary on siren kings was released by TVNZ, entitled Young and a Siren King.

== Competitions ==
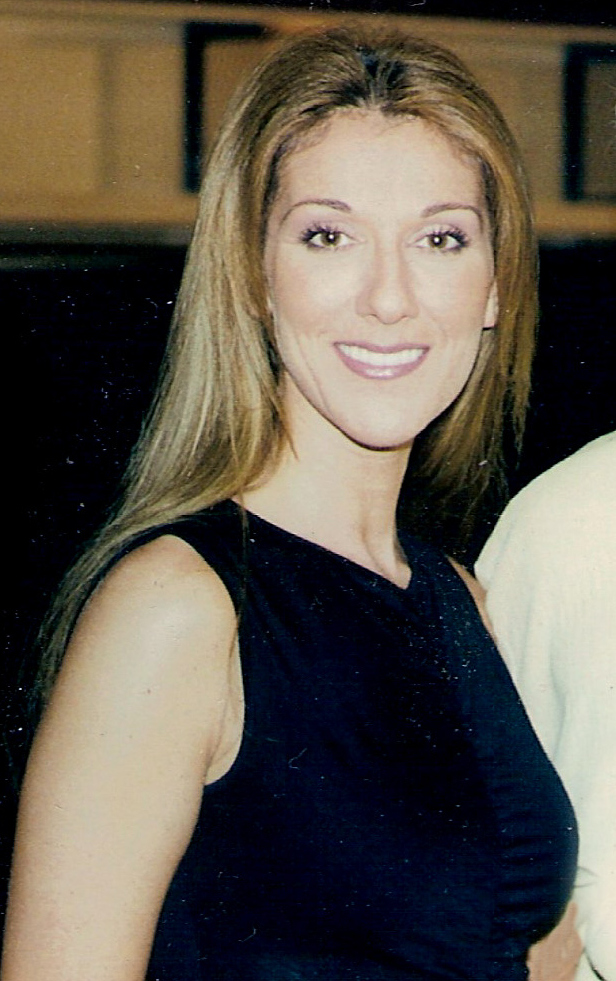
Music by French Canadian singer Celine Dion, such as "The Power of Love" and "My Heart Will Go On", are staple songs of siren events

Siren battles are typically judged competitions where contestants battle for the loudest sound. There are separate categories for cars and bicycles; often younger members of the crews compete in the bike category. Battles are usually done to win the title of siren king, but some battles can be to win each other's sirens. After the initial rounds, some battles end with a drownout round, a knockout round where contestants use their sirens together so judges can decide who has the more overwhelming sound.

To compete in a competition, a car or bike must be outfitted with a sound system including sirens, typically a mix of megaphones, stolen industrial public address systems, pulled apart radios, and Bluetooth speakers. For bicycles, sirens need to be strapped to the bike (typically the handlebars), usually powered by a car battery.

== Music ==
Song selection for siren battles is important, as the songs will need to showcase treble over bass, because of how loudspeakers are intended to project speech. Common songs used by siren crews include Celine Dion's "The Power of Love" and "My Heart Will Go On", and the music of the Vengaboys.

Some siren crew members produce their own music to use, known as siren jams or siren beats. Often inspired by genres such as reggae and dembow, the songs focus on treble over bass, and are intended to sound best while played through siren speakers, taking into account the Doppler effect. Most siren jams are shared online through sites such as YouTube and TikTok.

In 2020, siren jam producer Jawsh 685 from Manurewa saw success after his song "Laxed (Siren Beat)" became a TikTok meme called the Culture Dance, where people would show traditional clothing styles. After initially gaining popularity on TikTok, the song saw global success when American singer Jason Derulo used the track as the basis for his song "Savage Love", becoming one of the most successful songs of 2020.

== See also ==
- Boombox#Cultural significance
- Bōsōzoku
- Car tuning
- Tsunami sirens in New Zealand
