= Savage Love (Laxed – Siren Beat) =

2020 single by Jawsh 685 and Jason Derulo

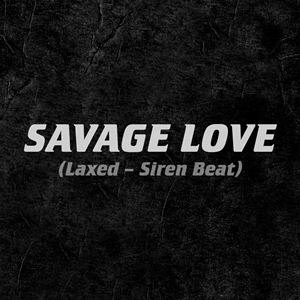

Single by Jawsh 685 and Jason Derulo
- Released: 11 June 2020
- Genre: Pop; reggaeton; siren jam
- Length: 2:51
- Label: Columbia
- Songwriters: Joshua Nanai; Jason Desrouleaux; Jacob Kasher Hindlin; Phil Greiss
- Producer: Jawsh 685

Jawsh 685 singles chronology
"Laxed (Siren Beat)" (2020)	"Savage Love (Laxed – Siren Beat)" (2020)	"Sweet & Sour" (2020)

Jason Derulo singles chronology
"Too Hot" (2020)	"Savage Love (Laxed – Siren Beat)" (2020)	"Coño" (2020)

Music videos
- "Savage Love (Laxed – Siren Beat)" on YouTube

"Savage Love (Laxed – Siren Beat)", originally known as "Savage Love", is a song by New Zealand music producer Jawsh 685 and American singer Jason Derulo. The song was officially released on 11 June 2020, following the resolution of sample clearance issues between the two artists.

"Savage Love (Laxed – Siren Beat)" peaked at number one in seventeen countries, including the United Kingdom, New Zealand and Australia. A remix featuring South Korean septet BTS was released on 2 October 2020, featuring a new verse sung in Korean. It features vocals predominantly from members Jungkook, Suga, and J-Hope. The remix reached number one on the US Billboard Hot 100, earning the second number-one song for both Jason Derulo and BTS, and first for Jawsh 685 on the chart. Additionally, the remix reached number one on the Billboard Global 200. BTS was listed as a credited act for one week on the mentioned charts.

== Background and promotion ==
=== Laxed (Siren Beat) ===
Jawsh 685 had originally posted the instrumental, titled "Laxed (Siren Beat)", to YouTube in 2019. Following its viral success via TikTok, "Laxed (Siren Beat)" was officially released to online platforms on 24 April 2020 and Jawsh 685 signed with Columbia Records in May 2020.

=== Unauthorised usage by Derulo ===
On 11 May 2020, Derulo teased "Savage Love" which was built off of a sample of "Laxed (Siren Beat)". However, Derulo did not credit Jawsh 685 nor did he obtain clearance for the sample. This sparked widespread backlash and calls for Derulo to properly clear the sample and credit Jawsh 685. It was reported that Jawsh 685 was in talks with multiple artists, including Derulo, to remix "Laxed (Siren Beat)", but Derulo "went 'rogue'" and released "Savage Love" without properly obtaining permission to do so. A source close to the situation stated that Derulo wanted the song for himself and to only have Jawsh 685 as the producer, but Jawsh 685 wanted more control over the work and did not want to be "bullied by a larger artist into putting [the song] out".

== Official release ==
On 11 June 2020, Columbia Records announced that the two artists had "put aside their differences" with Jawsh 685 allowing Derulo to use the sample. Jawsh 685 is credited as an artist and co-writer, as well as the track's sole producer. Additionally, "(Laxed – Siren Beat)" was added to the title.

Speaking to the Official Charts Company, Jawsh 685 stated that the track's early success took him entirely by surprise. "I created it one day after school last year", he said. "[I was] feeling relaxed so it made sense to call it 'Laxed'. The thought going into it took longer than the actual making of it – I think it only took me 4 hours to make."

"Jason first hit me up on my IG and he told me about his plan on adding lyrics to my beat", Jawsh 685 explained. "We never really came to an official agreement as I had a great team helping me make the best decisions. His song was pretty catchy, so in the end we came to an official agreement."

== Lyrics and composition ==
Jawsh 685 created the instrumental as a tribute to his Samoan and Cook Island heritage (685 is the country calling code for Samoa). It is an example of a siren jam, a New Zealand/Pasifika trend of creating beats to play through siren speakers, usually attached to cars or bikes. It also became a viral trend on TikTok, with users inspired to post "Culture Dance" videos in which they celebrate their heritage by dancing to the song while wearing traditional costumes.

To distinguish the song from other earlier unauthorised releases, a vocalisation of Jason Derulo's name is heard before the song begins.

== Critical reception ==
Stereogum panned the track: "Derulo makes an annoying track even worse. He tries to emote over that melody, and he just sounds silly. It's a TikTok stunt in song form."

== Commercial performance ==
=== North America ===
"Savage Love (Laxed – Siren Beat)" debuted at number 81 on the Billboard Hot 100 on the issue dated 27 June 2020. The song reached the top 10 in its seventh week on the chart on 8 August. With the ascension of the song to the top ten, "Savage Love (Laxed – Siren Beat)" became Jawsh 685's first top 10 hit as well as Derulo's first top ten hit since "Want to Want Me" in 2015 and first top 40 hit since "Swalla" in 2017. A remixed version with the South Korean band BTS jumped from number eight to number one on the issue dated 17 October 2020, becoming the second number-one hits for both Jason Derulo (his first since "Whatcha Say" in 2009, the longest time in between number-one hits for male artists since Dr. Dre's reached number one in 2009 with "Crack a Bottle" after a 12-year hiatus) and BTS (after their previous single "Dynamite") as well as Jawsh 685's first chart-topper.

"Savage Love (Laxed – Siren Beat)" debuted at number 26 on the Canadian Hot 100. It later reached number one on the issue dated 15 August 2020, becoming Jawsh 685's first and Jason Derulo's first number-one single in the country.

=== Europe, Oceania and Latin America ===
In the United Kingdom, "Savage Love (Laxed – Siren Beat)" debuted at number 22 on the UK Singles Chart on 19 June 2020 – for the week ending date 25 June 2020. It eventually peaked at the top of the chart on 3 July 2020 – for the week ending date 9 July 2020 – becoming Derulo's fifth number-one song in Britain. Overall, the single spent three consecutive weeks at the top of the UK Singles Chart.

In Ireland, the song debuted at number 23 in the charts before climbing to number one five weeks later, becoming Derulo's first number-one single in the Republic of Ireland.

The song also reached number one in Austria, Belgium, Germany, the Netherlands, Norway, Romania, Scotland, Sweden and Switzerland, as well as the top-ten in Czech Republic, Denmark, Finland, Italy and Slovakia.

In Australia, it topped the ARIA Charts for six non-consecutive weeks. The song also reached number one in New Zealand.

In Latin America, "Savage Love (Laxed – Siren Beat)" reached the top-ten in Panama and El Salvador, peaking at numbers 8 and 10, respectively. It also reached the top-twenty in Argentina, peaking at number 13.

== Track listings ==
- Original version
1. "Laxed (Siren Beat)" – 3:21
- Jason Derulo version
1. "Savage Love (Laxed – Siren Beat)" – 2:51
- BTS remix
1. "Savage Love (Laxed – Siren Beat)" (BTS remix) – 3:04
2. "Savage Love (Laxed – Siren Beat)" (BTS remix; instrumental) – 3:04

== Personnel ==
Credits adapted from Tidal.

- Jawsh 685 – production, songwriting, drum machine, keyboard, recording engineering
- Jason Derulo – songwriting, co-production, drum machine, lyrics
- Phil Greiss – songwriting, miscellaneous production, guitar
- Jacob Kasher – songwriting, lyrics
- Chris Quock – assistant engineering
- Robert Soukiasyan – mixing engineering
- Matthew Spatola - guitar, bass

== Charts ==
=== Weekly charts ===
Weekly chart performance
Chart (2020)	Peak position
Argentina Hot 100 (Billboard)	12
Australia (ARIA)	1
Austria (Ö3 Austria Top 40)	1
Belgium (Ultratop 50 Flanders)	1
Belgium (Ultratop 50 Wallonia)	2
Canada Hot 100 (Billboard)	1
CIS Airplay (TopHit)	8
Colombia Anglo (Monitor Latino)	13
Czech Republic Airplay (ČNS IFPI)	21
Czech Republic Singles Digital (ČNS IFPI)	2
Denmark (Tracklisten)	2
El Salvador (Monitor Latino)	10
Finland (Suomen virallinen lista)	2
France (SNEP)	6
Germany (GfK)	1
Greece International (IFPI)	1
Global 200 (Billboard) Combined with BTS remix	1
Hungary (Dance Top 40)	19
Hungary (Rádiós Top 40)	2
Hungary (Single Top 40)	1
Hungary (Stream Top 40)	5
Iceland (Tónlistinn)	4
Ireland (IRMA)	1
Israel Airplay (Media Forest)	1
Italy (FIMI)	6
Malaysia (RIM)	3
Mexico Airplay (Billboard)	1
Netherlands (Dutch Top 40)	1
Netherlands (Single Top 100)	1
New Zealand (Recorded Music NZ)	1
Norway (VG-lista)	1
Panama (Monitor Latino)	8
Poland Airplay (ZPAV)	9
Portugal (AFP)	5
Portugal Airplay (AFP)	1
Romania (Airplay 100)	1
Russia Airplay (TopHit)	11
San Marino Airplay (SMRTV Top 50)	13
Scottish Singles Sales (Official Charts)	1
Singapore (RIAS)	2
Slovakia Airplay (ČNS IFPI)	2
Slovakia Singles Digital (ČNS IFPI)	1
Slovenia (SloTop50)	1
Spain (PROMUSICAE)	29
Suriname (Nationale Top 40)	1
Sweden (Sverigetopplistan)	1
Switzerland (Schweizer Hitparade)	1
UK Singles (Official Charts)	1
US Billboard Hot 100 Combined with BTS remix	1
US Adult Contemporary (Billboard)	15
US Adult Pop Airplay (Billboard)	1
US Dance Airplay (Billboard)	12
US Pop Airplay (Billboard)	1
US Rhythmic Airplay (Billboard)	9
US Rolling Stone Top 100	7
Wales (OCC)	2

Weekly chart performance
Chart (2021)	Peak position
CIS Airplay (TopHit)	107
Russia Airplay (TopHit)	152

Weekly chart performance
Chart (2023)	Peak position
Belarus Airplay (TopHit)	159
Lithuania Airplay (TopHit)	163
Romania Airplay (TopHit)	114

Weekly chart performance
Chart (2024)	Peak position
Estonia Airplay (TopHit)	82

=== Monthly charts ===
Monthly chart performance
Chart (2020)	Peak position
CIS Airplay (TopHit)	10
Czech Republic (Rádio Top 100)	32
Czech Republic (Singles Digitál Top 100)	4
Russia Airplay (TopHit)	16
Slovakia (Rádio Top 100)	2
Slovakia (Singles Digitál Top 100)	1

=== Year-end charts ===
Year-end chart performance
Chart (2020)	Position
Argentina Airplay (Monitor Latino)	53
Australia (ARIA)	12
Austria (Ö3 Austria Top 40)	4
Belgium (Ultratop Flanders)	12
Belgium (Ultratop Wallonia)	22
Canada (Canadian Hot 100)	21
CIS Airplay (TopHit)	75
Denmark (Tracklisten)	17
France (SNEP)	39
Germany (Official German Charts)	7
Hungary (Rádiós Top 40)	31
Hungary (Single Top 40)	21
Hungary (Stream Top 40)	20
Iceland (Tónlistinn)	21
Ireland (IRMA)	17
Italy (FIMI)	16
Netherlands (Dutch Top 40)	9
Netherlands (Single Top 100)	13
New Zealand (Recorded Music NZ)	4
Norway (VG-lista)	9
Poland (ZPAV)	81
Portugal (AFP)	37
Romania (Airplay 100)	30
Russia Airplay (TopHit)	94
Sweden (Sverigetopplistan)	9
Switzerland (Schweizer Hitparade)	5
UK Singles (OCC)	11
US Billboard Hot 100	35
US Adult Top 40 (Billboard)	29
US Mainstream Top 40 (Billboard)	19
US Rhythmic (Billboard)	48

Year-end chart performance
Chart (2021)	Position
Australia (ARIA)	76
Austria (Ö3 Austria Top 40)	54
Canada (Canadian Hot 100)	31
France (SNEP)	122
Germany (Official German Charts)	62
Global 200 (Billboard)	37
Hungary (Dance Top 40)	95
Hungary (Rádiós Top 40)	56
New Zealand (Recorded Music NZ)	41
Portugal (AFP)	183
Switzerland (Schweizer Hitparade)	69
US Adult Top 40 (Billboard)	22

Year-end chart performance
Chart (2024)	Position
Estonia Airplay (TopHit)	127

== Awards and nominations ==
Awards and nominations for "Savage Love (Laxed – Siren Beat)"
Year	Organization	Award	Result	Ref.
2021	iHeartRadio Music Awards	TikTok Bop of the Year	Nominated	

== Certifications ==
Certifications
Region	Certification	Certified units/sales
Australia (ARIA)	5× Platinum	350,000^{‡}
Austria (IFPI Austria)	3× Platinum	90,000^{‡}
Belgium (BRMA)	Platinum	40,000^{‡}
Canada (Music Canada)	4× Platinum	320,000^{‡}
Denmark (IFPI Danmark)	2× Platinum	180,000^{‡}
France (SNEP)	Diamond	333,333^{‡}
Germany (BVMI)	2× Platinum	800,000^{‡}
Italy (FIMI)	3× Platinum	210,000^{‡}
Mexico (AMPROFON)	2× Platinum+Gold	150,000^{‡}
New Zealand (RMNZ)	6× Platinum	180,000^{‡}
Norway (IFPI Norway)	2× Platinum	120,000^{‡}
Poland (ZPAV)	3× Platinum	60,000^{‡}
Portugal (AFP)	2× Platinum	20,000^{‡}
Spain (Promusicae)	Platinum	40,000^{‡}
Switzerland (IFPI Switzerland)	2× Platinum	40,000^{‡}
United Kingdom (BPI)	2× Platinum	1,200,000^{‡}
United States (RIAA)	4× Platinum	4,000,000^{‡}
Streaming
Greece (IFPI Greece)	Gold	1,000,000^{†}
Sweden (GLF)	2× Platinum	16,000,000^{†}
^{‡} Sales+streaming figures based on certification alone.^{†} Streaming-only figures based on certification alone.

== Release history ==
Release history and formats for "Savage Love (Laxed – Siren Beat)"
Region	Date	Format	Version	Label	Ref.
Various	24 April 2020	Digital download; streaming	Original version	Columbia	
Various	11 June 2020	Digital download; streaming	Jason Derulo version	Columbia	
United States	7 July 2020	Contemporary hit radio	Jason Derulo version	Columbia	

== BTS remix ==
"Savage Love (Laxed – Siren Beat)" (BTS remix)
- Remix cover

Single by Jawsh 685, Jason Derulo, and BTS
- Released: 2 October 2020
- Length: 3:04
- Label: Columbia
- Songwriters: Jacob Kasher Hindlin; Jason Desrouleaux; Joshua Nanai; Philippe Greiss; Jung Ho-seok; Min Yoon-gi
- Producers: Jawsh 685; Jason Derulo

Jawsh 685 singles chronology
"Sweet & Sour" (2020)	"Savage Love (Laxed – Siren Beat)" (BTS remix) (2020)

Jason Derulo singles chronology
"Take You Dancing" (2020)	"Savage Love (Laxed – Siren Beat)" (BTS Remix) (2020)	"Love Not War (The Tampa Beat)" (2020)

BTS singles chronology
"Dynamite" (2020)	"Savage Love (Laxed – Siren Beat)" (BTS Remix) (2020)	"Life Goes On" (2020)

Lyric video
- "Savage Love (Laxed – Siren Beat) (BTS Remix)" on YouTube

=== Background and composition ===
A remix of "Savage Love (Laxed – Siren Beat)" with South Korean boy band BTS was released for digital download and streaming in various countries on 2 October 2020 through Columbia Records. An accompanying animated lyric video was uploaded to BTS' YouTube channel on the same day. Speaking about how the collaboration with BTS happened, Jawsh 685 said:

What those guys are doing right now is huge. I respect them so much. Like "Sweet & Sour", my teams linked up with theirs and brought them on. It's cool to get another version of the beat out there. It means even more people will hear a Siren Beat, which is what I want. I really like seeing how people interpret the beat and do something different with it every time. It was an exciting idea of my team to sort out, went with it and are very excited for everyone to just listen to it and vibe!

The remix has identical credits to the original "Savage Love (Laxed – Siren Beat)" with the addition of BTS band members Suga and J-Hope as songwriters. On the song, BTS members, predominantly Jungkook, J-Hope and Suga, perform in both English and Korean, alongside Jason Derulo. Jungkook sings mostly on the chorus while Suga and J-Hope perform rap-inspired vocals on a new verse in Korean. Prior to its digital release, BTS performed a TikTok dance challenge to the original version of the song alongside Jason Derulo and Jawsh 685.

=== Commercial performance ===
Following the release of the remix, the song rose to number one on the US Billboard Hot 100 crediting the remix on the issue dated 17 October 2020, becoming the second number-one hits for both Jason Derulo (his first since "Whatcha Say" in 2009, the longest time in between number-one hits for male artists since Dr. Dre's "Crack a Bottle" reached number one after a 12-year hiatus in 2009) and BTS (after their previous single "Dynamite") as well as Jawsh 685's first chart topper. BTS became the first group to simultaneously hold the top two spots on the Hot 100 in a decade since Black Eyed Peas in 2009 and fifth overall group to do so. The remix earned 16 million US streams, 70.6 million radio airplay audio impressions and sold 76,000 copies, becoming the second top-selling song of the week. It peaked at number one on the Billboard Global 200 chart, with 77.5 million global streams and 62,000 global downloads, making BTS the first act to earn multiple number-one songs on the chart, and at number three on the Global Excl. U.S. Chart. It also peaked at number six on South Korea's Gaon Digital Chart and number nine on the New Zealand Hot Singles chart.

The following week, on the issue dated 24 October 2020, "Savage Love" dropped from number one to number six on the Billboard Hot 100, with BTS' credit removed as the remix did not outperform the original version during the tracking week.

=== Credits and personnel ===
Credits adapted from Tidal.

- BTS – vocals
- Jason Derulo – vocals, co-producer, composer, songwriter, drum machine
- J-Hope – songwriter
- Suga – songwriter
- Jawsh 685 – producer, composer, recording engineer, drum machine, keyboards
- Jacob Kasher Hindlin – composer, songwriter
- Phil Greiss – composer, guitar, miscellaneous producer
- Pdogg – engineer
- Chris Quock – assistant engineer
- Juan "Saucy" Peña – vocal engineer
- Jenna Andrews – vocal producer
- Robbie Soukiasyan – mixing engineer

=== Charts ===
Weekly chart performance
Chart (2020)	Peak position
Canada (Canadian Hot 100)	2
Global 200 (Billboard)	1
Japan (Japan Hot 100)	73
Lithuania (AGATA)	40
New Zealand Hot Singles (RMNZ)	9
South Korea (Gaon)	6
US Billboard Hot 100	1

Year-end chart performance
Chart (2021)	Position
South Korea (Gaon)	24
Chart (2022)	Position
South Korea (Circle)	169

=== Accolades ===
Awards and nominations for "Savage Love (Laxed – Siren Beat) (BTS Remix)"
Year	Organization	Award	Result	Ref.
2020	Melon Music Awards	Best Pop	Nominated	
2021	Gaon Chart Music Awards	Song of the Year – October	Nominated	

Melon Popularity Award
Award	Date	Ref.
Weekly Popularity Award	26 October 2020	
Weekly Popularity Award	2 November 2020	
Weekly Popularity Award	9 November 2020	
Weekly Popularity Award	16 November 2020	
Weekly Popularity Award	23 November 2020	

=== Certifications ===
Certifications for "Savage Love (Laxed – Siren Beat)" (BTS Remix)
Region	Certification	Certified units/sales
Streaming
Japan (RIAJ)	Gold	50,000,000^{†}
South Korea (KMCA)	Platinum	100,000,000^{†}
^{†} Streaming-only figures based on certification alone.

=== Release history ===
Release history (BTS Remix)
Region	Date	Format	Label	Ref.
Various	2 October 2020	Digital download; streaming	Columbia	

== See also ==
- List of Airplay 100 number ones of the 2020s
- List of Billboard Global 200 number ones of 2020
- List of Billboard Hot 100 number ones of 2020
- List of Billboard Hot 100 top-ten singles in 2020
- List of Billboard Mainstream Top 40 number-one songs of 2020
- List of Canadian Hot 100 number-one singles of 2020
- List of Dutch Top 40 number-one singles of 2020
- List of German airplay number-one songs of 2020
- List of Media Forest most-broadcast songs of the 2020s in Romania
- List of most-streamed songs on Spotify
- List of number-one hits of 2020 (Austria)
- List of number-one hits of 2020 (Germany)
- List of number-one hits of 2020 (Switzerland)
- List of number-one singles of 2020 (Australia)
- List of number-one singles of 2020 (Ireland)
- List of number-one singles of 2020 (Slovenia)
- List of number-one songs of 2020 (Mexico)
- List of top 10 singles in 2020 (France)
- List of top 10 singles in 2020 (Ireland)
- List of UK Singles Chart number ones of the 2020s
- List of Ultratop 50 number-one singles of 2020
