= Emergency Mobile Alert =

Mobile phone emergency alerting system in New Zealand

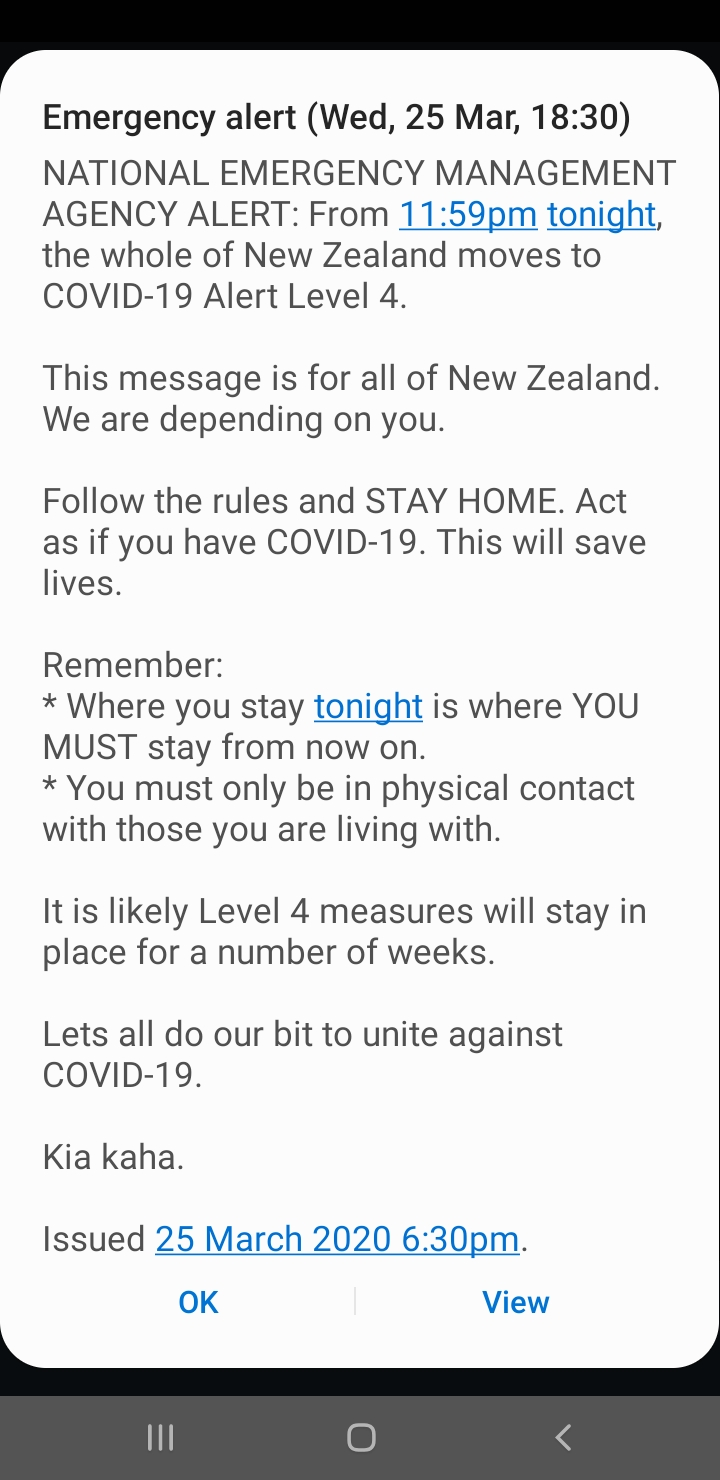
An Emergency Mobile Alert sent on 25 March 2020 about the imminent national lockdown for the COVID-19 pandemic

Emergency Mobile Alerts (EMA) is an alerting network in New Zealand designed to disseminate emergency alerts to mobile devices.

Emergency Mobile Alerts are messages about emergencies sent by New Zealand authorised emergency agencies to capable mobile phones. The alerts are sent to participating wireless providers who will distribute the alerts to their customers with compatible devices via cell broadcast, a technology best suitable for public warning as it simultaneously delivers messages to all phones using a mobile cell tower.

== Introduction ==
Emergency Mobile Alerts has been used in New Zealand since November 2017, and every year a test message is sent which is broadcast throughout New Zealand.

One2many B.V. provides the system including the Cell Broadcast systems and the CAP (Common Alerting Protocol) based centralised public warning management system.

=== Adoption rate ===
The reach of the Control Cell Broadcast message among New Zealanders who have access to a mobile phone has increased since the first test message resulting that on 24 November 2019, 8 out of 10 mobile handsets (79%) received a test emergency alert message sent out by Civil Defence and a further eight (8%) percent didn't personally receive the alert but were near someone who did reaching in the end 87% of the New Zealand population.

On 26 November 2017, 58% of NZ population with access to mobile phone either received the nationwide test alert or was near someone who did receive the Cell Broadcast message. This was 79% in November 2018, 87% in November 2019, and 92% in May 2025.

== Testing ==
The Emergency Mobile Alert system is tested annually. During these tests, alerts are sent to all compatible mobile phones across the country. The contents of the test alerts signify that they are tests and describe the purpose of the alerts; for example the 2025 message started with "TEST MESSAGE – Emergency Mobile Alert" and included the text "You may receive an Emergency Mobile Alert like this if there is serious danger to life, health or property in your area ... ". The tests usually take place between 6 and 7 pm. In 2026 social media users made jokes associating this time period with the 6-7 Internet meme. Civil Defence responded by making a video referencing the meme in their social media advertising.

== Map ==
In June 2026 Civil Defence launched an online web page that allows users to view current Emergency Mobile Alerts on a map, including the message contents. The map shows alerts issued by the various authorities that can issue the alerts. The web page states that it takes up to 15 minutes for alerts to appear on the map.

== Notable uses ==
Tone similar to NZ tone

- 22 October 2019 – New Zealand International Convention Centre fire, Auckland.
- 25 March 2020 – Announcement of impending moves of COVID-19 Alert Levels.
- 29 and 31 January 2023 – 2023 Auckland Anniversary Weekend floods, Auckland.
- 14 February 2023 – Evacuation notice due to Cyclone Gabrielle, Muriwai.
- 30 July 2025 – Tsunami warning due to the 2025 Kamchatka Peninsula earthquake.

== See also ==
- Early warning system
- Emergency communication system
- Emergency population warning broadcasting
- Tsunami sirens in New Zealand
- Volcanic Alert Level (NZ)
