= Volcanic Alert Level =

New Zealand risk management system

In New Zealand, Volcano Alert Bulletins (VABs) are the official source of warnings and alerts including current Volcanic Alert Level (VAL), intended to inform stakeholder agencies, authorities, and the public about emergencies so they can take action.

The Ministry of Civil Defence & Emergency Management, through The National Emergency Management Agency is responsible for providing such alerts to warn about natural hazards. A Scientific Alert Level is applied to the Volcano Status based on Indicative Phenomena. GNS Science operates the national geological hazards monitoring network (GeoNet).

== Levels ==
The Volcanic Alert Level system has six levels ranging from 5 (major volcanic eruption) to 0 (no volcanic activity):

Volcanic Alert Level	Volcanic Activity	Most likely hazards	Example
5	Major volcanic eruption	Eruption hazards on and beyond volcano	–
4	Moderate volcanic eruption	Eruption hazards on and near volcano	2019 Whakaari / White Island eruption
3	Minor volcanic eruption	Eruption hazards near vent	–
2	Moderate to heightened volcanic unrest	Volcanic unrest hazards, potential for eruption hazards	Whakaari / White Island in 2019 before eruption
1	Minor volcanic unrest	Volcanic unrest hazards	–
0	No volcanic unrest	Volcanic environment hazards	–

== Elsewhere ==
To help prevent harm when living or working on or near a volcano, countries have adopted classifications to describe the various levels and stages of volcanic activity, the two main volcano warning systems being colour codes and/or numeric alert levels.

- United States Alert System
- Indonesia Alert System
- Russia
- Alaska Alert System
- Vanuatu Volcanic Alert Level
- Colombia Alert System

The three common popular classifications of volcanoes can be subjective, and some volcanoes thought to have been extinct have erupted again.
