= National Emergency Management Agency (New Zealand) =

New Zealand government department

- Te Rākau Whakamarumaru (Māori)

Agency overview
- Formed: 1 December 2019
- Preceding agency: Ministry of Civil Defence and Emergency Management
- Jurisdiction: New Zealand
- Headquarters: TSB House, Wellington
- Minister responsible: Mark Mitchell, Minister for Emergency Management
- Agency executive: David Gawn, Chief Executive
- Parent agency: Department of Internal Affairs
- Child agency: National Crisis Management Centre
- Website: civildefence.govt.nz

The National Emergency Management Agency (NEMA; Māori: Te Rākau Whakamarumaru) is the public service department of New Zealand responsible for providing leadership and support around national, local and regional emergencies. It is an autonomous departmental agency hosted by the Department of Internal Affairs. It replaced the Ministry of Civil Defence and Emergency Management in December 2019.

The incumbent minister is listed in the Ministerial List. As of 2025 the Minister for Emergency Management was Mark Mitchell.

== History ==
No formal civil defence or emergency management structure existed in New Zealand until the 1930s, when the increasing threat of war prompted the formation of the Emergency Precautions Scheme, which was controlled by the Department of Internal Affairs. In addition to war, earthquake risk was another concern of the Scheme, prompted in part by the 1931 Hawke's Bay earthquake. During World War II, the name of the EPS was changed to Civil Defence. While EPS/Civil Defence did not need to respond to any invasion attempts, it was twice called upon to assist with earthquake recovery efforts in Wellington and the Wairarapa region in 1942.

=== First Minister of Civil Defence ===
Following the war, responsibility for civil defence was assumed by the Department of Internal Affairs. A Review of Defence white paper, issued by the Second Labour Government amid the fear of nuclear war, proposed the establishment of a separate Ministry of Civil Defence. The first Director of Civil Defence was J.V. Meech (also the Secretary of Internal Affairs), though in practice much of the work was delegated to Andrew Sharp; the first Minister of Civil Defence in the post-war period was Bill Anderton (also the Minister of Internal Affairs). The Civil Defence Act 1962 set out in legislation the responsibilities and duties of the Ministry. In 1964, the first full-time Director of Civil Defence was appointed: Brigadier R.C. Queree.

A new Ministry for Emergency Management was established under the National/New Zealand First Coalition Government by Civil Defence Minister Jack Elder on 1 July 1999, following the Review of Emergency Services. This replaced the existing Ministry of Civil Defence. Later, the department name changed again to become the Ministry of Civil Defence & Emergency Management.

=== Transfer to Department of Prime Minister and Cabinet ===
The Ministry of Civil Defence & Emergency Management remained a business unit of the Department of Internal Affairs until 1 April 2014, when it was transferred to the Department of the Prime Minister and Cabinet (DPMC). This was intended to reflect DMPC's role as the government's lead agency in national security planning.

Beginning 1 December 2019, the Ministry's name was changed to the National Emergency Management Agency (NEMA). Its structure was also changed, with it becoming a departmental agency and the appointment of NEMA's first interim chief executive (rather than reporting through to the chief executive of DPMC). A departmental agency is an operationally autonomous agency with its own chief executive, hosted by a department of the New Zealand public service.

=== Transfer back to Department of Internal Affairs ===
On 25 September 2025, NEMA was transferred back to the Department of Internal Affairs.

=== Inquiry following North Island severe weather events ===
In 2024, the Government released the findings of an inquiry into the performance of New Zealand's emergency management system. The inquiry focussed on the response to three severe weather events in the North Island in early 2023: Cyclone Hale (8 to 12 January), Auckland Anniversary floods (26 January to 3 February), and Cyclone Gabrielle (12 to 16 February). The three severe weather events caused 15 fatalities, and the estimated cost of damage was in the range $9–14.5 billion. The inquiry report concluded that:

Many communities and CDEM (Civil Defence Emergency Management) agencies were not adequately prepared, communication and warnings were non-existent or insufficient, and the capability and capacity of people and infrastructure was overestimated or lacking.

The National Emergency Management Agency conducted its own internal review and concluded that it lacked sufficient well-trained personnel and leadership to deal with the severe weather events. It also found that the facilities used by the National Crisis Management Centre and the National Co-ordination Centre were not fit for purpose and that technology used by these centres was not reliable.

== Activities ==
The Agency administers the Civil Defence Emergency Management Act 2002 and:

- advises government on matters relating to civil defence emergency management
- identifies hazards and risks
- develops, maintains and evaluates the strategy for civil defence emergency management
- ensures coordination at national, regional and local levels
- promotes civil defence emergency management and deliver public awareness about how to prepare for, and what to do in, an emergency
- supports planning, operations and capability development for the civil defence emergency management sector, and develops standards and guidelines
- monitors and evaluates the performance of Civil Defence Emergency Management groups in 16 regions
- maintains and operates the National Crisis Management Centre, including providing personnel to staff the Centre
- issues public information and warnings
- manages the response of central government to major emergencies (such as earthquake, tsunami, landslide, volcanic eruptions or unrest, floods, severe winds, snow, coastal hazards, and failure of critical infrastructure)

Since 2017, Civil Defence has used Emergency Mobile Alert technologies to deliver essential emergency information to mobile phones in New Zealand. The alert system is tested annually; during the 2017 test, Vodafone accidentally sent the test alert message at 1 am.

== List of ministers for emergency management ==
Key

National Labour NZ First Mauri Pacific

No.	Name	Portrait	Term of office		Prime Minister
1	William Bodkin		30 June 1942	2 October 1942	Fraser (in the War Administration)
2	David Wilson		30 October 1942	12 April 1944	Fraser
1944–1959: See Minister of Internal Affairs
3	Bill Anderton		24 June 1959	12 December 1960	Nash
4	Leon Götz		12 December 1960	20 December 1963	Holyoake
5	David Seath		20 December 1963	9 February 1972	Holyoake
6	Allan Highet		9 February 1972	8 December 1972	Marshall
7	Tom McGuigan		8 December 1972	10 September 1974	Kirk
8	Henry May		10 September 1974	12 December 1975	Rowling
(6)	Allan Highet		12 December 1975	26 July 1984	Muldoon
9	Peter Tapsell		26 July 1984	24 July 1987	Lange
10	Michael Bassett		24 July 1987	9 February 1990	Lange
10	Michael Bassett		24 July 1987	9 February 1990	Palmer
11	Margaret Austin		9 February 1990	2 November 1990	Palmer
11	Margaret Austin		9 February 1990	2 November 1990	Moore
12	Graeme Lee		2 November 1990	29 November 1993	Bolger
13	Warren Cooper		29 November 1993	1 March 1996	Bolger
14	John Banks		1 March 1996	1 November 1996	Bolger
15	Murray McCully		1 November 1996	16 December 1996	Bolger
16	Jack Elder		16 December 1996	10 December 1999	Bolger
16	Jack Elder		16 December 1996	10 December 1999	Shipley
17	George Hawkins		16 December 1999	19 October 2005	Clark
18	Rick Barker		19 October 2005	19 November 2008	Clark
19	John Carter		19 November 2008	8 June 2011	Key
20	Craig Foss		8 June 2011	14 December 2011	Key
21	Chris Tremain		14 December 2011	30 January 2013	Key
22	Nikki Kaye		30 January 2013	20 December 2016	Key
22	Nikki Kaye		30 January 2013	20 December 2016	English
23	Gerry Brownlee		20 December 2016	2 May 2017	English
24	Nathan Guy		2 May 2017	26 October 2017	English
25	Kris Faafoi		26 October 2017	27 June 2019	Ardern
26	Peeni Henare		27 June 2019	6 November 2020	Ardern
27	Kiri Allan		6 November 2020	14 June 2022	Ardern
28	Kieran McAnulty		14 June 2022	27 November 2023	Ardern
28	Kieran McAnulty		14 June 2022	27 November 2023	Hipkins
29	Mark Mitchell		27 November 2023	present	Luxon

== See also ==
- Lifeline utility
