= Digital Song Sales =

Billboard chart

Billboard logo (from 2013)

The Digital Song Sales (previously named Digital Songs and Hot Digital Songs) ranks the most downloaded songs in the United States, as compiled by Luminate and published by Billboard magazine. Although it originally started tracking song sales the week of October 30, 2004, it officially debuted in the issue dated January 22, 2005, and merged all versions of a song sold from digital music distributors. Its data was incorporated in the Hot 100 three weeks later. Since October 2004, digital sales have been incorporated into many of Billboard's music singles charts. The decision was based on the dramatic increase of the digital market while commercial single sales in a physical format were becoming negligible.

The first number one song on the Digital Song Sales chart was "Just Lose It" by Eminem. The chart's current number one as of the issue dated November 21, 2026, is "Choosin' Texas" by Ella Langley.

== Song records ==
=== Songs with most weeks at number one in sales ===
- 21 weeks

Ella Langley – "Choosin' Texas" (2025–2026)

- 18 weeks

BTS – "Dynamite" (2020–2021)
BTS – "Butter" (2021)

- 17 weeks

Luis Fonsi and Daddy Yankee featuring Justin Bieber – "Despacito" (2017)

- 16 weeks

Lil Nas X featuring Billy Ray Cyrus – "Old Town Road" (2019)

- 15 weeks

Shaboozey – "A Bar Song (Tipsy)" (2024)

- 13 weeks

Flo Rida featuring T-Pain – "Low" (2007–2008)
Mark Ronson featuring Bruno Mars – "Uptown Funk" (2015)
The Chainsmokers featuring Halsey – "Closer" (2016)

- 12 weeks

Alex Warren – "Ordinary" (2025)

=== Top 10 single-week download sellers ===
1. Adele – "Hello" (1,112,000) November 14, 2015
2. Flo Rida – "Right Round" (636,000) February 28, 2009
3. Adele – "Hello" (635,000) November 21, 2015
4. Taylor Swift – "We Are Never Ever Getting Back Together" (623,000) September 1, 2012
5. Kesha – "Tik Tok" (610,000) January 9, 2010
6. Taylor Swift – "I Knew You Were Trouble" (582,000) January 12, 2013
7. Bruno Mars – "Grenade" (559,000) January 8, 2011
8. Katy Perry – "Roar" (557,000) August 31, 2013
9. Taylor Swift – "Shake It Off" (544,000) September 6, 2014
10. Gotye featuring Kimbra – "Somebody That I Used to Know" (542,000) April 28, 2012

=== Biggest first-week sales ===
1. Adele – "Hello" (1,112,000) November 14, 2015
2. Flo Rida – "Right Round" (636,000) February 28, 2009
3. Taylor Swift – "We Are Never Ever Getting Back Together" (623,000) September 1, 2012
4. Katy Perry – "Roar" (557,000) August 31, 2013
5. Taylor Swift – "Shake It Off" (544,000) September 6, 2014
6. Justin Bieber – "Boyfriend" (521,000) April 14, 2012
7. Maroon 5 featuring Wiz Khalifa – "Payphone" (493,000) May 5, 2012
8. The Black Eyed Peas – "Boom Boom Pow" (465,000) April 18, 2009
9. Lady Gaga – "Born This Way" (448,000) February 26, 2011
10. Ariana Grande featuring Iggy Azalea – "Problem" (438,000) May 17, 2014

=== Biggest jump to number one ===
- 66–1: will.i.am and Britney Spears – "Scream & Shout" (December 15, 2012)
- 57–1: Zac Efron, Vanessa Hudgens and Drew Seeley – "Breaking Free" (February 11, 2006)
- 50–1: Taio Cruz featuring Ludacris – "Break Your Heart" (March 20, 2010)
- 50–1: Lee Greenwood – "God Bless the U.S.A." (July 18, 2020)
- 44–1: Beyoncé – "Cuff It" (February 17, 2023)
- 42–1: Wiz Khalifa featuring Charlie Puth – "See You Again" (April 18, 2015)
- 38–1: Shakira featuring Wyclef Jean – "Hips Don't Lie" (June 17, 2006)
- 35–1: Kelly Clarkson – "Piece by Piece" (March 19, 2016)
- 34–1: J Balvin and Willy William featuring Beyoncé – "Mi Gente" (October 21, 2017)
- 33–1: Billie Eilish – "No Time to Die" (February 29, 2020)
- 33-1: Brandon Lake - "Gratitude" (October 4, 2025)

=== Longest climb to number one ===
- 33 weeks

Dua Lipa – "Levitating" (2021)

- 26 weeks

The All-American Rejects – "Dirty Little Secret" (2005–2006)

- 25 weeks

The Fray – "How to Save a Life" (2006)
Train – "Hey, Soul Sister" (2009–2010)

- 24 weeks

Lady Gaga featuring Colby O'Donis – "Just Dance" (2008–2009)

- 23 weeks

Adele – "Set Fire to the Rain" (2011–2012)

- 22 weeks

Beyoncé – "Cuff It" (2022-2023)

- 20 weeks

Cardi B, Bad Bunny and J Balvin — "I Like It" (2018)

=== Biggest drop from number one ===
- 1–38: Jordan Smith – "Mary, Did You Know?" (January 9, 2016)
- 1–28: The Weeknd – "Heartless" (December 21, 2019)
- 1–19: Glee Cast – "Teenage Dream" (December 4, 2010)
- 1–19: Prince & the Revolution – "Purple Rain" (May 21, 2016)

=== Song achievements ===
- "Party in the U.S.A." by Miley Cyrus and "Gangnam Style" by Psy hold the record of most weeks at number one on Digital Song Sales without topping the overall Billboard Hot 100, with six weeks each.
- "I Gotta Feeling" by The Black Eyed Peas holds the record for the biggest-selling digital download in the U.S., with sales of over 8 million copies by 2012. The song was the first to surpass 6–8 million downloads.
- "Low" by Flo Rida featuring T-Pain was the first song to surpass 4–5 million downloads. It was also named the Top Digital Song of the 2000s decade.
- Soulja Boy's "Crank That (Soulja Boy)" was the first song to surpass 3 million downloads.
- Daniel Powter's "Bad Day" was the first song to surpass 2 million downloads.
- "Hollaback Girl" by Gwen Stefani was the first song in history to surpass 1 million downloads.
- "Right Round" by Flo Rida holds the record for the largest debut/overall sales week for a male for a digital song with 636,000 downloads.
- "Rolling in the Deep" by Adele holds the record for the most digitally downloaded song in a calendar year.
- "Payphone" by Maroon 5 featuring Wiz Khalifa holds the record for the largest debut/overall sales week for a group for a digital song with 493,000 downloads.
- "We Are Young" by Fun. featuring Janelle Monáe is the first song to log seven weeks of 300,000 or more in digital sales.
- "Thrift Shop" by Macklemore and Ryan Lewis featuring Wanz is the first song to log eight and nine weeks of 300,000 or more in digital sales.
- "Blurred Lines" by Robin Thicke featuring T.I. and Pharrell is the first song to log 10 weeks of 300,000 or more in digital sales and the first song to log four weeks of 400,000 or more in digital sales.
- "Somebody That I Used to Know" by Gotye featuring Kimbra is the first song to log three weeks of 400,000 or more in digital sales.
- "Hello" by Adele holds the record for the largest debut/overall sales week for a digital song with 1.112 million downloads and the largest non-debut sales week for a digital song with 635,000 downloads. It is additionally the only song in history to debut with or achieve 1 million downloads sold in a week, and to log two weeks of 600,000 in digital sales. It surpassed the 4 million mark in its thirteenth week, faster than any other song in digital history.
- "Lean on Me" by Bill Withers is the oldest song to reach number one on the Digital Song Sales chart. The song was released on April 21, 1972, and reached the top, following Withers' death, on the chart dated April 18, 2020.

== Album records ==
- Teenage Dream (2010) by Katy Perry holds the record for most digital number-ones from an album, with five. "California Gurls" featuring Snoop Dogg, "Teenage Dream," "Firework," "E.T." featuring Kanye West and "Last Friday Night (T.G.I.F.)" all topped the chart.
- Four albums by Taylor Swift had four digital number-ones each on the chart: "Shake It Off", "Blank Space", "Out of the Woods", and "Bad Blood" from 1989 (2014); "Look What You Made Me Do", "...Ready for It?", "Gorgeous", and "Call It What You Want" from Reputation (2017); "Me!", "You Need to Calm Down", "Lover", and "Cruel Summer" from Lover (2019); and "Anti-Hero", Question...?", "Hits Different", and "You're Losing Me" from Midnights (2022).

== Artist records ==
=== Most number-one hits ===
1. Taylor Swift (33)
2. Nicki Minaj (17)
3. BTS (15) (tie)
3. Drake (15) (tie)
4. Rihanna (14)
5. Justin Bieber (13)
6. Beyoncé (12) (tie)
6. Eminem (12) (tie)
6. Bruno Mars (12) (tie)
7. Katy Perry (11)

=== Most weeks at number one ===
1. Taylor Swift (67)
2. BTS (55)
3. Rihanna (40)
4. Katy Perry (37)
5. Bruno Mars (34)

=== Self-replacement at number one ===
- Mariah Carey – "All I Want for Christmas Is You" (two non-consecutive weeks) → "Don't Forget About Us" (one week) (December 31, 2005)
- T.I. – "Whatever You Like" (one week) → "Live Your Life" (T.I. featuring Rihanna) (one week) (October 18, 2008)
- Beyoncé – "If I Were a Boy" (one week) → "Single Ladies (Put a Ring on It)" (two weeks) (December 6, 2008)
- The Black Eyed Peas – "Boom Boom Pow" (ten weeks) → "I Gotta Feeling" (ten weeks) (June 27, 2009)
- Glee Cast – "Teenage Dream" (one week) → "Forget You" (one week) (December 4, 2010)
- Iggy Azalea – "Problem" (Ariana Grande featuring Iggy Azalea) (three weeks) → "Fancy" (Iggy Azalea featuring Charli XCX) (four weeks) (June 7, 2014)
- Taylor Swift – "Shake It Off" (four non-consecutive weeks) → "Out of the Woods" (one week) (November 1, 2014)
- Jordan Smith – "Somebody to Love" (one week) → "Mary, Did You Know?" (one week) (January 2, 2016)
- Drake – "Pop Style" (Drake featuring The Throne) (one week) → "One Dance" (Drake featuring Wizkid and Kyla) (one week) (April 30, 2016)
- Justin Bieber – "Despacito" (Luis Fonsi and Daddy Yankee featuring Justin Bieber) (seventeen non-consecutive weeks) → "I'm the One" (DJ Khaled featuring Justin Bieber, Quavo, Chance the Rapper and Lil Wayne) (one week) (May 20, 2017)
- Taylor Swift – "Look What You Made Me Do" (one week) → "...Ready for It?" (one week) (September 23, 2017)
- Drake – "God's Plan" (eight non-consecutive weeks) → "Nice for What" (one week) (April 21, 2018)
- BTS – "Dynamite" (eighteen non-consecutive weeks) → "Film Out" (one week) (April 17, 2021)
- BTS – "Butter" (seven consecutive weeks) → "Permission to Dance" (one week) (July 24, 2021)
- BTS – "Permission to Dance" (one week) → "Butter" (eight non-consecutive weeks) (July 31, 2021)
- BTS – "Butter" (seventeen non-consecutive weeks) → "My Universe" (Coldplay and BTS) (one week) (October 9, 2021)
- Nicki Minaj – "Blick Blick" (Coi Leray and Nicki Minaj) (one week) → "We Go Up" (Nicki Minaj featuring Fivio Foreign) (one week) (April 9, 2022)
- Morgan Wallen – "Thought You Should Know" (one week) → "You Proof" (one week) (May 28, 2022)
- Jimin – "Set Me Free Pt. 2" (one week) → "Like Crazy" (two weeks) (April 8, 2023)
- Ed Sheeran – "Eyes Closed" (one week) → "Life Goes On" (Ed Sheeran featuring Luke Combs) (one week) (May 27, 2023)

=== Simultaneously occupying the top two positions ===
- Mariah Carey: December 31, 2005
1. "Don't Forget About Us"
2. "All I Want for Christmas Is You"
- Beyoncé: December 6, 2008
1. "Single Ladies (Put a Ring on It)"
2. "If I Were a Boy"
- The Black Eyed Peas: June 27, 2009, through July 4, 2009
1. "I Gotta Feeling"
2. "Boom Boom Pow"
- Kesha: January 23, 2010
1. "Tik Tok"
2. "Blah Blah Blah" (featuring 3OH!3)
- Taylor Swift: September 22, 2012
1. "We Are Never Ever Getting Back Together"
2. "Ronan"
- Iggy Azalea: May 17, 2014, through June 21, 2014
1. "Problem" (Ariana Grande featuring Iggy Azalea)
2. "Fancy" (Iggy Azalea featuring Charli XCX) (songs switched positions on June 7, 2014)
- Taylor Swift: November 1, 2014
1. "Out of the Woods"
2. "Shake It Off"
- Prince: May 14, 2016
1. "Purple Rain"
2. "When Doves Cry"
- Ed Sheeran: January 28, 2017
1. "Shape of You"
2. "Castle on the Hill"
- Justin Bieber: May 20, 2017, through May 27, 2017, and June 17, 2017, through July 1, 2017
1. "I'm the One" (DJ Khaled featuring Justin Bieber, Quavo, Chance the Rapper and Lil Wayne)
2. "Despacito" (Luis Fonsi and Daddy Yankee featuring Justin Bieber) (songs switched positions on May 27, 2017)
- Taylor Swift: September 23, 2017
1. "...Ready for It?"
2. "Look What You Made Me Do"
- Ed Sheeran: January 3, 2018
1. "Perfect" (Ed Sheeran duet with Beyoncé)
2. "River" (Eminem featuring Ed Sheeran)
- Cardi B: June 30, 2018, through July 14, 2018
1. "Girls Like You" (Maroon 5 featuring Cardi B)
2. "I Like It" (Cardi B, Bad Bunny and J Balvin)
- Lady Gaga: October 20, 2018
1. "Shallow" (Lady Gaga and Bradley Cooper)
2. "I'll Never Love Again"
- Lady Gaga: October 27, 2018, through November 3, 2018
1. "Shallow" (Lady Gaga and Bradley Cooper)
2. "Always Remember Us This Way"
- The Weeknd: December 14, 2019
1. "Heartless"
2. "Blinding Lights"
- BTS: March 7, 2020
1. "On"
2. "My Time"
- Kenny Rogers: April 4, 2020
1. "The Gambler"
2. "Islands in the Stream" (Kenny Rogers and Dolly Parton)
- Bill Withers: April 18, 2020
1. "Lean on Me"
2. "Ain't No Sunshine"
- BTS: October 17, 2020
1. "Dynamite"
2. "Savage Love (Laxed – Siren Beat)" (Jawsh 685 x Jason Derulo x BTS )
- BTS: December 5, 2020
1. "Life Goes On"
2. "Blue & Grey"
- BTS: December 19, 2020
1. "Life Goes On"
2. "Dynamite"
- BTS: July 24, 2021, through August 21, 2021
1. "Permission to Dance"
2. "Butter" (songs switched positions on July 31, 2021)
- BTS: October 9, 2021
1. "My Universe" (Coldplay and BTS)
2. "Butter"
- Taylor Swift: November 5, 2022
1. "Question...?"
2. "Bigger Than the Whole Sky"
- Taylor Swift: June 5, 2023
1. "Hits Different"
2. "Karma" (Taylor Swift featuring Ice Spice)
- Oliver Anthony Music: August 26, 2023
1. "Rich Men North of Richmond"
2. "Aint Gotta Dollar"
- Oliver Anthony Music: September 2, 2023
1. "Rich Men North of Richmond"
2. "I Want To Go Home"
- Beyoncé: February 20, 2024
1. "Texas Hold 'Em"
2. "16 Carriages"
- Taylor Swift: October 10, 2026
1. "Patient Zero"
2. "Cleveland!"

=== Most single-week entries in the top 50 ===
1. Prince (21)
2. BTS (18)
3. Michael Jackson (17)
4. Taylor Swift (16)
5. Rihanna (14)
6. Oliver Anthony Music (13)

=== Other achievements ===
- In 2009, Michael Jackson became the first artist to sell over one million downloads in a week, with 2.6 million sales.
- Katy Perry became the first artist in digital history to sell 300,000 downloads in a week with eight different songs: "Hot n Cold" (2008), "California Gurls" (2010), "Firework" (2010), "E.T." (2011), "The One That Got Away" (2011), "Part of Me" (2012), "Roar" (2013), and "Dark Horse" (2014).
- Rihanna was named the Digital Songs Artist of the 2000s decade.
- Adele is the only artist to have a song earn one million downloads in a week, with "Hello" (2015).
- Ed Sheeran is the first artist to debut two songs at the top two spots for the same week: "Shape of You" and "Castle on the Hill" (both 2017).
- Lauren Daigle holds the record for the highest-ever debut by a contemporary Christian artist. She achieved this when "You Say" (2018) debuted at number five on the chart.
- BTS was the first act to debut six songs in the top 10 and to occupy the top six spots for the same week. They achieved this in 2020 with "Life Goes On", "Blue & Grey", "Stay", "Telepathy", "Dis-ease" and "Fly To My Room", all tracks from their fifth Korean-language studio album, Be (2020).
- Taylor Swift is the only artist to have debuted ten songs in the top-10 region simultaneously and the only act to hold the entire top-10 spots of a week, achieving it with tracks from her tenth studio album, Midnights (2022).

== See also ==
- Digital distribution
