= Blue & Grey (song) =

2020 song by BTS

Song by BTS

from the album Be
- Released: November 20, 2020
- Genre: Pop
- Length: 4:14
- Label: Big Hit; Columbia
- Songwriters: Park Ji-soo; Levi; V; Hiss Noise; Suga; RM; J-Hope; Metaphor
- Producers: Park Ji-soo; Levi; V; Hiss Noise

"Blue & Grey" is a song by South Korean boy band BTS from their fifth Korean-language studio album, Be (2020). The song was written by Suga, RM, J-Hope, Metaphor, and its producers Park Ji-soo, Levi, V, and Hiss Noise. Originally intended to be included on V's solo mixtape, the song was released on November 20, 2020, as the third track on the album. A slow, tender pop ballad, its lyrics reflect on depression, burnout, anxiety, and pandemic-induced loneliness using the colors blue and grey.

"Blue & Grey" received generally positive reviews from music critics, who praised its vulnerability, production, and BTS' vocal performance. Some critics picked the song as a standout track on Be. Commercially, the song became a successful album track, reaching number 13 on the US Billboard Hot 100 and number 9 on the Billboard Global 200, becoming the top-selling song globally that week. It further entered the charts of 10 countries, including Hungary and South Korea.

== Background and release ==
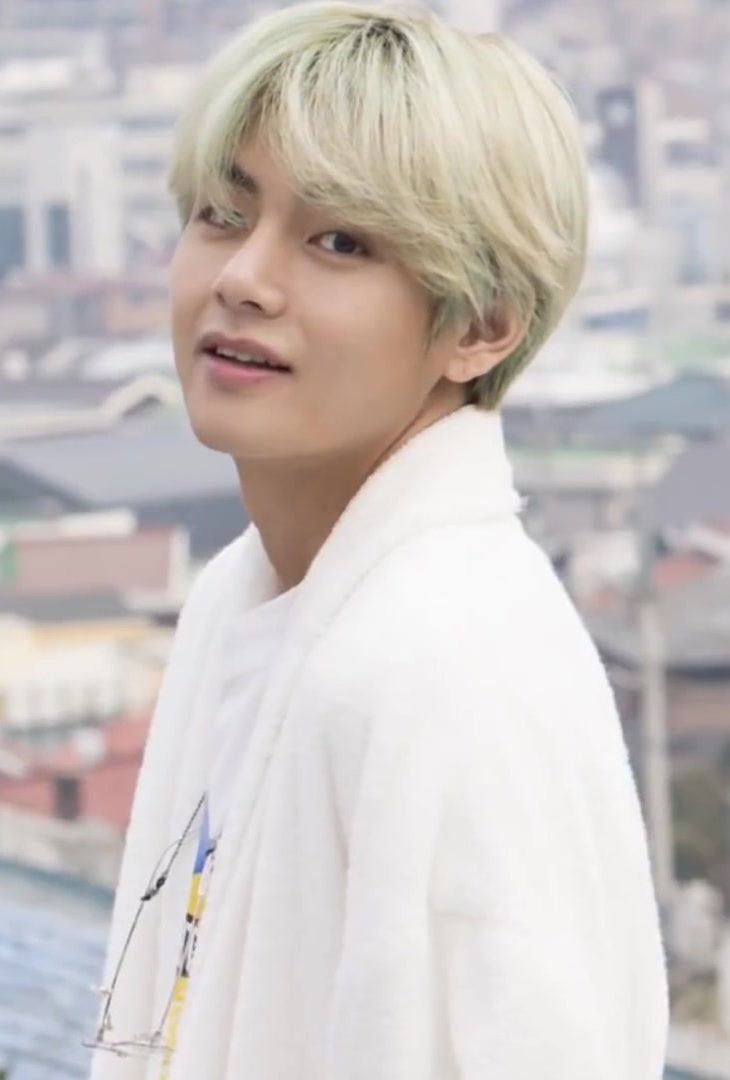
BTS member V (pictured) co-wrote and co-produced "Blue & Grey".

On November 10, 2020, BTS posted the track list of their fifth Korean-language studio album Be via social media, which revealed "Blue & Grey" as a track on the album. The song was written by Suga, RM, J-Hope, Metaphor, and its producers Park Ji-soo, Levi, V, and Hiss Noise. Hiss Noise and Park Ji-soo played the drums; the latter also played the guitar, piano, strings, and clarinet. V provided backing vocals for the track and Pdogg handled the vocal arrangement. The song was recorded by J-Hope, RM, Suga, and Pdogg, while Yang Ga mixed it at Big Hit Studios in Seoul.

"Blue & Grey" was initially slated to be a part of band member V's solo mixtape. It was originally in English and was first teased during BTS' reality show In the Soop in September 2020. In an interview with Korea JoongAng Daily, the song's co-producer Park Ji-soo (NIve) revealed that he got to know V through South Korean singer Paul Kim, with whom he had worked as a producer on Kim's song "The Reason for My Spring" (2020). V and NIve scheduled songwriting sessions at the latter's studio, where they decided to create "a good song" together; "Blue & Grey" was one of the songs conceived during these sessions. The track was included on Be after BTS listened to and liked it. It was released on November 20, 2020, as the third track on Be.

== Music and lyrics ==
"Blue & Grey"
A 25-second sample of the pre-chorus and chorus of "Blue & Grey", a soft pop ballad, driven by sparse instrumental production and breathy vocals. The lyrics address themes that include depression and anxiety.

Musically, "Blue & Grey" is a slow, melancholic, soft pop ballad, with a length of four minutes and 14 seconds. It is written in the key of G♯ major with a tempo of 122 beats per minute. The song is set in a "cinematic" arrangement of minor chords and relies on a "sparse-yet-tender" production that includes acoustic guitar, twinkling pianos, and wistful strings. The song contains "spoken-word" and "rapping segments" interspersed with "breathy", "crooning", "eerie whale-call" vocals, and "chilly" chords. The song uses the colors blue and grey to illustrate depression and anxiety.

Lyrically, the song explores the themes of fear, depression, burn-out, and pandemic-induced loneliness. In the opening verse of the track, V confesses dejectedly, as indicated in the lines: "Someone come and save me, please/ only the sighs of an exhausting day." It is followed by an audible exhalation from Jungkook who leads the breathy verse, reflecting on the blues. A similar "weighty exhalation" from Suga takes place before his rap verse, which he delivers in a "laidback" rhyming pattern. Jimin lends a "plaintive" and "cheery" tenor to the song. Kat Moon from Time magazine noted that an "h" sound is repeated in both Korean and English throughout the track, which she associated with the "motif of sighing deeply from exhaustion." Meanwhile, Aja Romano of Vox rendered the breathy vocal touches as "comfort pop" sounds, noting them being used to create "intimacy between artist and listener" in the song. In the lyrics, BTS also plead for happiness and aching loneliness: "I just want to be happier, is this too much greed?", and remind the listener to be hopeful: "If, in a far-flung future, I'm able to smile / I'll tell you that I did."

== Critical reception ==
"Blue & Grey" was met with generally positive reviews from music critics. In the Los Angeles Times, August Brown named it as "one of the exemplary songs of the 'pandemic-pop' era" that acts as "a ribbon of immaculate bedroom emo, gorgeously harmonized but never show-offy or overpowering." Jochan Embley of the Evening Standard called the song "the schmaltziest moment on the album, ticking all the boxes for all the feels." Reviewing for NME, Rhian Daly raved about BTS' vocal delivery and chose "Blue & Grey" as the "most devastating song on the album [..] in terms that are crushingly vulnerable," writing that the song's "redemptive arc is longer, lower and harder to spot." Lenika Cruz of The Atlantic labelled the track a "midnight-colored lullaby" and wrote that it "speak[s] to BTS's stylistic omnivorousness." Stereogum reviewer Chris DeVille called the song "the only true slow jam" on Be, praising the "compositional and production details," and opined that it is akin to "Linkin Park and Sigur Rós teaming up to write a Boyz II Men song." Romano lauded the "confessional quality" of the song and hailed BTS' "gorgeous" and emotional vocal delivery, which he found similar to "the melodic equivalent of an ASMR session."

Moon deemed the song as "the most emotionally raw number on the album." Raisa Bruner from Time called it "the most poetic–and introspective–track off of Be," complimenting the balance created by band members Suga and J-Hope who "modulate their rapping to fit the slower, more gentle tone" of the song. In The Quietus, Verónica A. Bastardo wrote that the song is "a cosy approach to anxiety where whispering voices sing rawly about depression while a bright piano plays at the back, reminiscing hopefully." Emma Saletta of MTV News described it as a "fresh spin on a ballad," acknowledging both BTS' honesty and the blend of their vocals with acoustic guitar. Writing for The Independent, Annabel Nugent dubbed the track as "an apt anthem for the sad and sexy [..] moods of lockdown." Exclaim! writer Eva Zhu labelled the song "heartbreaking" and commended the lyrical themes as "too relatable." Similarly, AllMusic's Neil Z. Yeung called the song "crushing" while praising BTS' "vulnerability and intimacy." In a review published by The Arts Desk, Peter Quinn considered the song "touching" and said that it "offers a moment of plaintive, pandemic-related reflection." Lexi Lane from NBC News wrote that the track is "the band's way to show millions of fans worldwide that everyone has been having negative thoughts, too." Slant Magazine's Sophia Ordaz called it a "pretty" ballad.

== Commercial performance ==
"Blue & Grey" debuted at number 13 on the US Billboard Hot 100, becoming BTS' sixth highest-charting entry on the chart. In its opening week, the song sold over 69,000 units in the United States, becoming the second top-selling song of the week dated December 5, 2020, only behind BTS' "Life Goes On". It also reached number two on both the US Digital Songs Sales and the World Digital Song Sales charts. In Canada, the song reached number 64 on the Canadian Hot 100, while ranking at number 5 on the Digital Song Sales chart. In the United Kingdom, "Blue & Grey" opened at number 66 on the UK Singles Chart, becoming the third song from the album to enter the chart, following "Life Goes On" and "Dynamite". On the UK Indie Chart, the song ranked number nine. In Ireland, it charted at number 76 on the Irish Singles Chart. In South Korea, the song peaked at number 6 on Billboard K-pop Hot 100 and number 24 on the Gaon Digital Chart. The song arrived at number 98 on the Billboard Japan Hot 100 on the issue dated November 30, 2020, and peaked at number 52 the following week. It also attained top five positions in Malaysia and Singapore.

On the Billboard Global 200, which tracks the most streamed and digitally sold songs in over 200 territories, "Blue & Grey" arrived at number nine, earning 26.8 million streams and 87,000 units sold globally, becoming the top-selling song of the tracking week. It became BTS' third top 10 hit on the chart and also became the third song from Be to enter the top 10. The song also entered at number 15 on the Billboard Global Excl. U.S. chart, which tracks the same metrics with the exclusion of the US.

== Credits and personnel ==
Credits adapted from Tidal and the liner notes of Be.

- BTS – primary vocals
- V – songwriting, production
- Park Ji-soo – songwriting, production, guitar, piano, strings, clarinet, drums
- Hiss Noise – songwriting, production, drums, digital editing
- Levi – songwriting, production
- RM – songwriting, rap arrangement, recording
- Suga – songwriting, rap arrangement, recording
- J-Hope – songwriting, rap arrangement, recording
- Metaphor – songwriting
- Pdogg – vocal arrangement, recording
- Yang Ga – mixing

== Charts ==
=== Weekly charts ===
Chart performance for "Blue & Grey"
Chart (2020)	Peak position
Canada Hot 100 (Billboard)	64
Global 200 (Billboard)	9
Hungary (Single Top 40)	2
Ireland (IRMA)	76
Japan (Japan Hot 100)	52
Lithuania (AGATA)	49
Malaysia (RIM)	3
New Zealand Hot Singles (RMNZ)	7
Singapore (RIAS)	5
South Korea (Gaon)	24
South Korea (K-pop Hot 100)	6
UK Indie (Official Charts)	9
UK Singles (Official Charts)	66
US Billboard Hot 100	13
US Rolling Stone Top 100	12
US World Digital Song Sales (Billboard)	2

=== Year-end charts ===
Year-end chart performance
Chart (2020)	Position
Hungary (Single Top 40)	91

== Certifications ==
Region	Certification	Certified units/sales
Streaming
Japan (RIAJ)	Gold	50,000,000^{†}
^{†} Streaming-only figures based on certification alone.
