= List of Billboard Hot 100 number ones of 2020 =

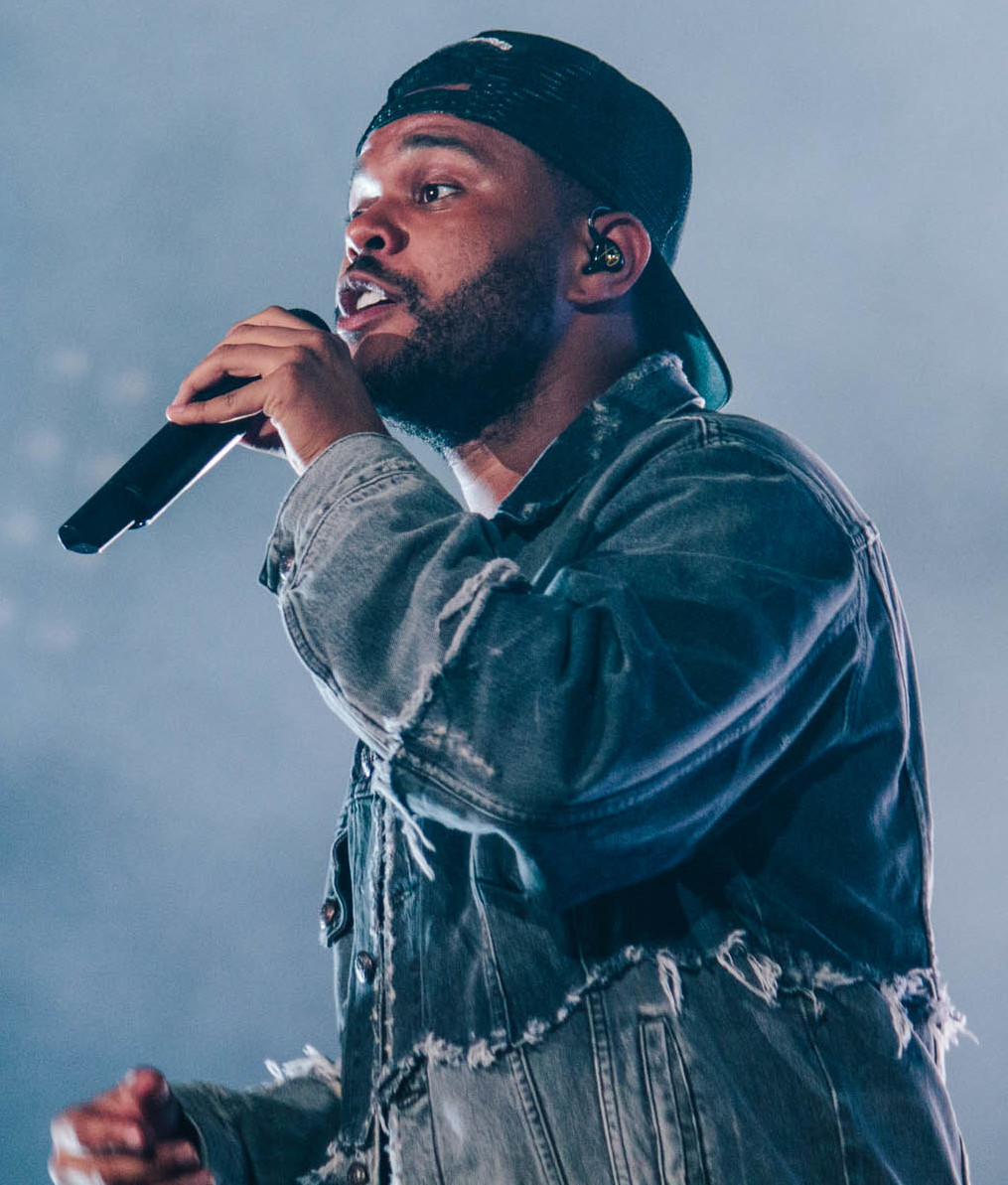
"Blinding Lights" by the Weeknd was the best-performing song of the year and broke the record for most weeks in the top five and top ten of the Hot 100.

The Billboard Hot 100 is a chart that ranks the best-performing songs in the United States. Its data, published by Billboard magazine and compiled by MRC Data, is based collectively on each song's weekly physical and digital sales, as well as the amount of airplay received on American radio stations and streaming on online digital music outlets.

During 2020, twenty singles reached number-one on the Hot 100, making 2020 the year with the most number-one hits on the Hot 100 since 1991, which had twenty-seven. In addition, two other number-one singles in 2020, "All I Want for Christmas Is You" by Mariah Carey and "Circles" by Post Malone, had each previously hit number one in 2019. Twenty-five artists reached the top of the Hot 100 in 2020, with thirteen—Roddy Ricch, Kid Cudi, Doja Cat, Nicki Minaj, Megan Thee Stallion, DaBaby, 6ix9ine, Harry Styles, BTS, M.I.A., Jawsh 685, 24kGoldn, and Iann Dior—achieving their first number-one single. Ariana Grande and BTS scored three number ones each. Ricch's "The Box" was the longest-running number-one of the year, leading the chart for eleven weeks, whereas the Weeknd's "Blinding Lights" was the year's best performing song on the chart, topping the Billboard Year-End Hot 100.

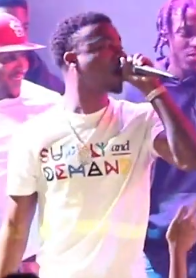
Roddy Ricch earned his first two Hot 100 number-ones with "The Box" and DaBaby collaboration "Rockstar", and spent the most weeks atop the chart in 2020, with 18 weeks.

For the first time since 1990, six songs topped the Hot 100 in six consecutive weeks, namely "The Scotts" by The Scotts (Travis Scott and Kid Cudi), "Say So" by Doja Cat featuring Minaj, "Stuck with U" by Grande and Justin Bieber, "Savage" by Megan Thee Stallion featuring Beyoncé, "Rain on Me" by Lady Gaga and Grande, and "Rockstar" by DaBaby featuring Ricch. Billboard highlighted this unusual amount of turnover for the number-one spot on the chart, and cited many reasons to this phenomenon—song remixes, organized fan buying/streaming activities and the release of numerous collectible physical copies (CDs and vinyls) and bundles by artists to encourage their fans to purchase multiple copies of a song. This made the Hot 100 chart "more of a first-week factor than usual", explaining the drop in sales units of a song after it peaked at the number-one spot.

In July 2020, Billboard announced that the Hot 100 chart would "no longer allow" the sales of physical/digital bundles (physical singles that are clubbed with digital downloads) to be reported as digital sales, which is a "widespread" industry practice of not manufacturing and shipping the vinyls, CDs and other physical copies to consumers for weeks or months, but making the bundled digital download instantly redeemable, a tactic generally used by artists like Grande, Bieber and 6ix9ine to boost their chart positions; Billboard asserted that those physical singles would only be counted when they are shipped to the consumer, making the tactic "ineffectual".

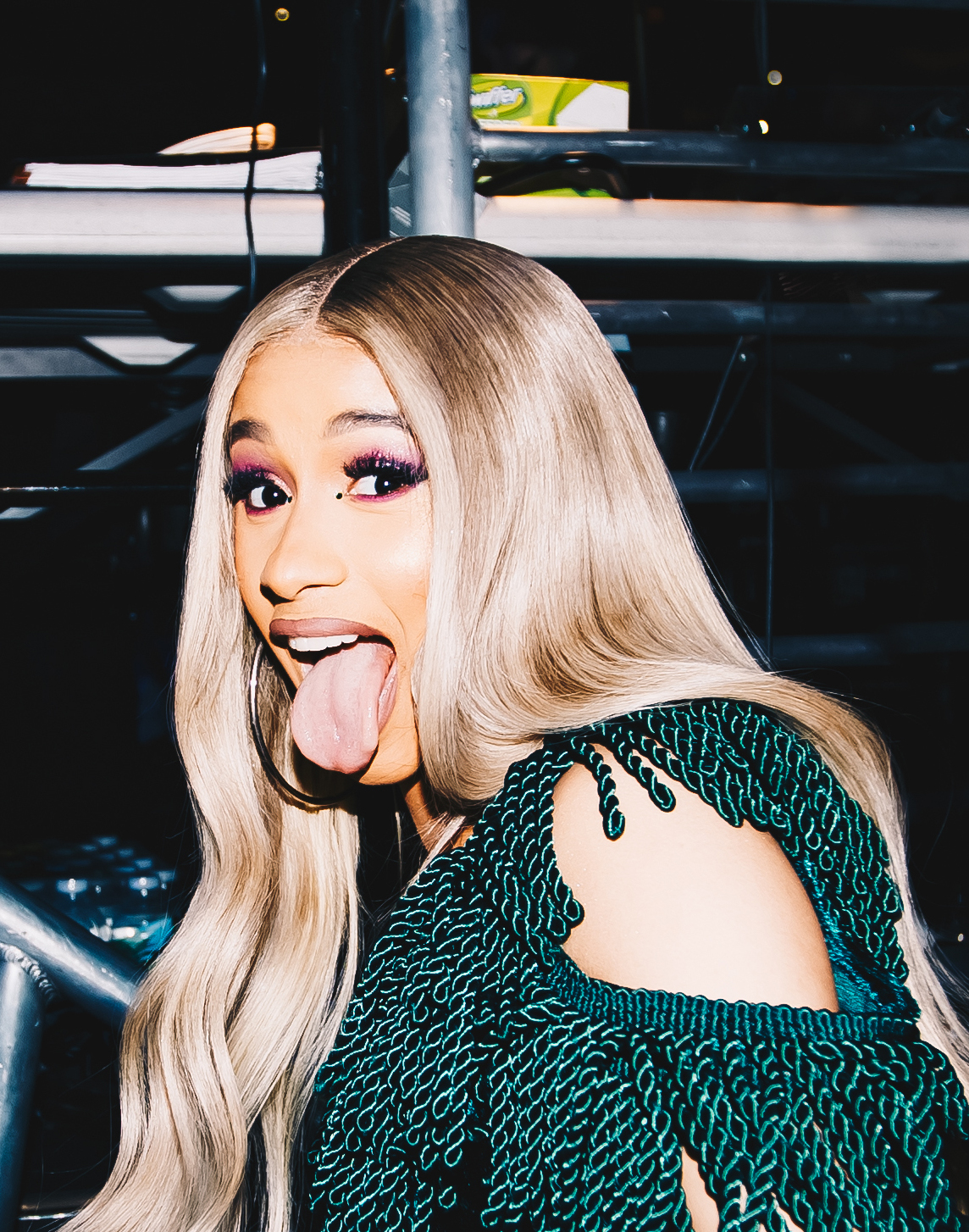
Cardi B reached number-one with "WAP", becoming the first female rapper to achieve four number ones, as well as in different decades.

The year 2020 broke the record for the calendar year that spawned the most number-one debuts on the Hot 100, with twelve songs debuting atop the chart: Drake's "Toosie Slide", "The Scotts" by Scott and Cudi, "Stuck With U" by Grande and Bieber, "Rain On Me" by Gaga and Grande, "Trollz" by 6ix9ine and Minaj, Taylor Swift's "Cardigan", Cardi B's "WAP" featuring Megan Thee Stallion, BTS's "Dynamite", Scott's "Franchise" featuring Young Thug and M.I.A., Grande's "Positions", BTS's "Life Goes On", and Swift's "Willow", in that order. 2020 further marked the first calendar year in Hot 100 history to have more than one all-female collaboration reach the number-one spot, with four.

== Chart history ==
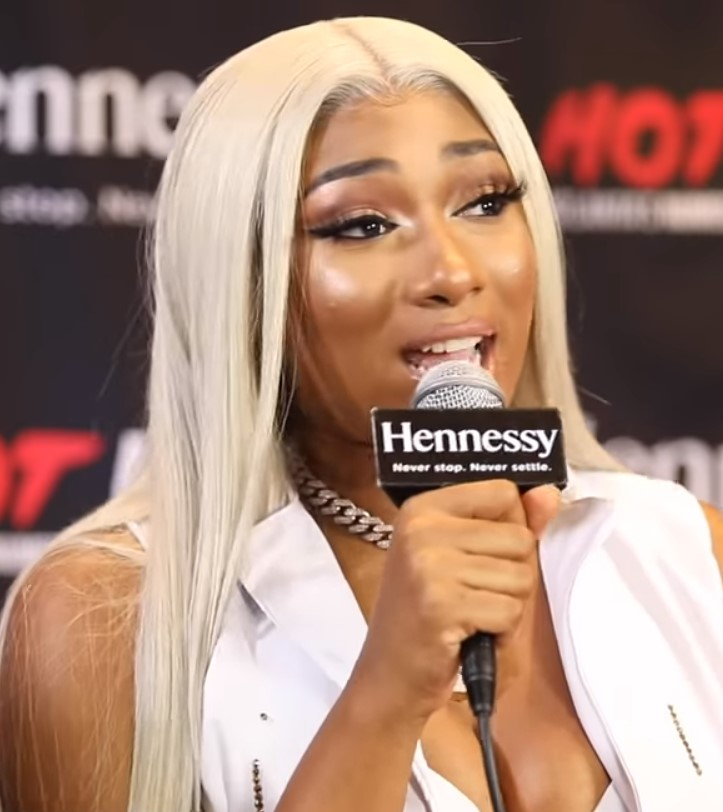
Megan Thee Stallion received her first two number ones with her collaborations with Beyoncé in "Savage" and with Cardi B in "WAP".

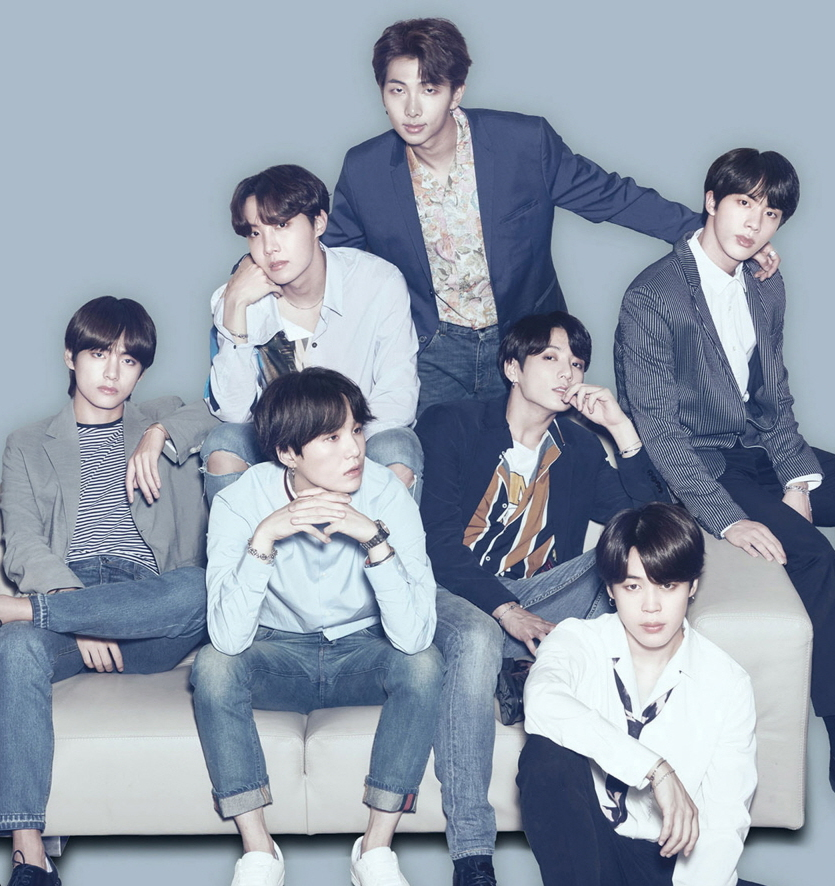
BTS scored three number-ones, including "Life Goes On", the first Korean-language song to top the Hot 100.

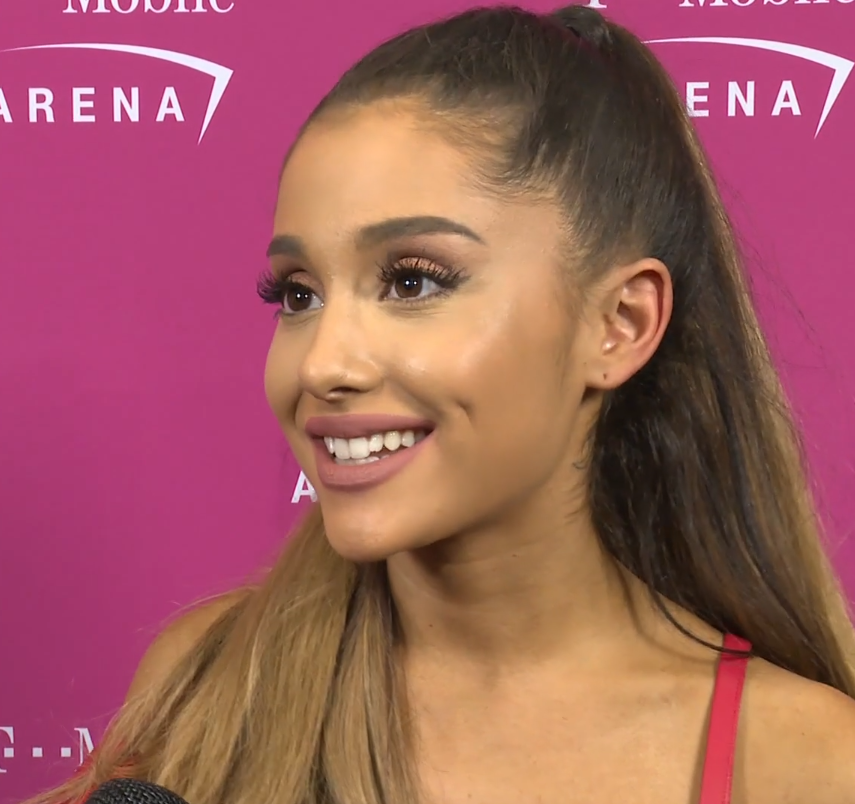
Ariana Grande scored three number-ones with "Rain on Me", and "Stuck with U, and "Positions"; all three debuting atop the Hot 100, making her the first act to have their first five number-ones debut at that position.

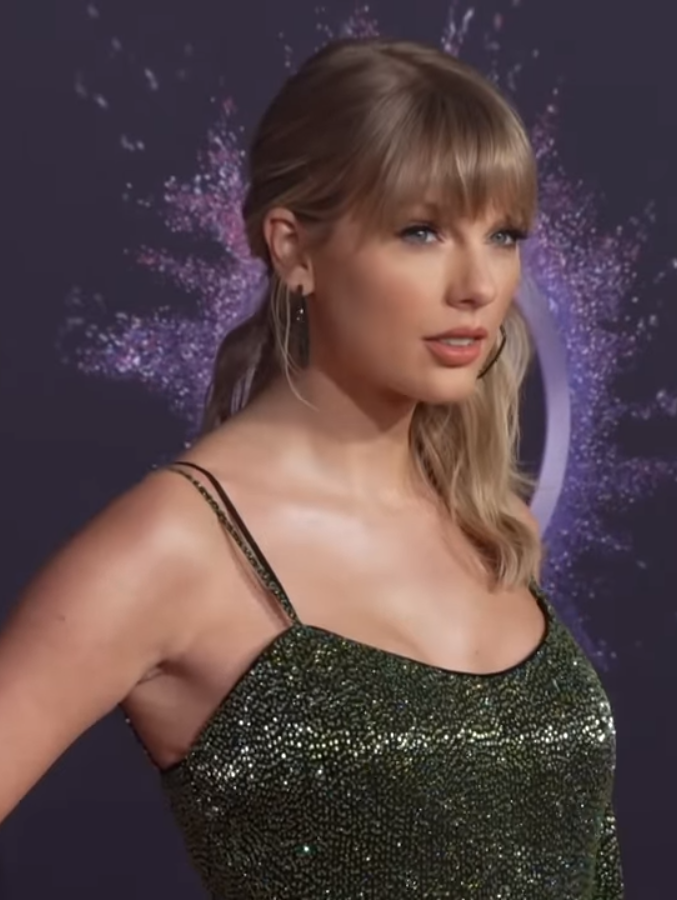
Taylor Swift scored her sixth and seventh number-ones with "Cardigan" and "Willow"; both debuted atop the Hot 100 the same week their parent albums opened atop the Billboard 200, making her the first act to do so.

Key
†	Indicates best-performing song of 2020

No.	Issue date	Song	Artist(s)	Ref.
1095	January 4	"All I Want for Christmas Is You"	Mariah Carey	
re	January 11	"Circles"	Post Malone	
1096	January 18	"The Box"	Roddy Ricch	
1096	January 25	"The Box"	Roddy Ricch	
1096	February 1	"The Box"	Roddy Ricch	
1096	February 8	"The Box"	Roddy Ricch	
1096	February 15	"The Box"	Roddy Ricch	
1096	February 22	"The Box"	Roddy Ricch	
1096	February 29	"The Box"	Roddy Ricch	
1096	March 7	"The Box"	Roddy Ricch	
1096	March 14	"The Box"	Roddy Ricch	
1096	March 21	"The Box"	Roddy Ricch	
1096	March 28	"The Box"	Roddy Ricch	
1097	April 4	"Blinding Lights" †	The Weeknd	
1097	April 11	"Blinding Lights" †	The Weeknd	
1098	April 18	"Toosie Slide"	Drake	
re	April 25	"Blinding Lights" †	The Weeknd	
re	May 2	"Blinding Lights" †	The Weeknd	
1099	May 9	"The Scotts"	The Scotts, (Note: The Scotts is a duo consisting of Travis Scott and Kid Cudi, though they are also credited as solo artists for the song.) Travis Scott and Kid Cudi	
1100	May 16	"Say So"	Doja Cat featuring Nicki Minaj	
1101	May 23	"Stuck with U"	Ariana Grande and Justin Bieber	
1102	May 30	"Savage"	Megan Thee Stallion featuring Beyoncé	
1103	June 6	"Rain on Me"	Lady Gaga and Ariana Grande	
1104	June 13	"Rockstar"	DaBaby featuring Roddy Ricch	
1104	June 20	"Rockstar"	DaBaby featuring Roddy Ricch	
1105	June 27	"Trollz"	6ix9ine and Nicki Minaj	
re	July 4	"Rockstar"	DaBaby featuring Roddy Ricch	
re	July 11	"Rockstar"	DaBaby featuring Roddy Ricch	
re	July 18	"Rockstar"	DaBaby featuring Roddy Ricch	
re	July 25	"Rockstar"	DaBaby featuring Roddy Ricch	
re	August 1	"Rockstar"	DaBaby featuring Roddy Ricch	
1106	August 8	"Cardigan"	Taylor Swift	
1107	August 15	"Watermelon Sugar"	Harry Styles	
1108	August 22	"WAP"	Cardi B featuring Megan Thee Stallion	
1108	August 29	"WAP"	Cardi B featuring Megan Thee Stallion	
1109	September 5	"Dynamite"	BTS	
1109	September 12	"Dynamite"	BTS	
re	September 19	"WAP"	Cardi B featuring Megan Thee Stallion	
re	September 26	"WAP"	Cardi B featuring Megan Thee Stallion	
re	October 3	"Dynamite"	BTS	
1110	October 10	"Franchise"	Travis Scott featuring Young Thug and M.I.A.	
1111	October 17	"Savage Love (Laxed – Siren Beat)"	Jawsh 685, Jason Derulo and BTS	
1112	October 24	"Mood"	24kGoldn featuring Iann Dior	
1112	October 31	"Mood"	24kGoldn featuring Iann Dior	
1113	November 7	"Positions"	Ariana Grande	
re	November 14	"Mood"	24kGoldn featuring Iann Dior	
re	November 21	"Mood"	24kGoldn featuring Iann Dior	
re	November 28	"Mood"	24kGoldn featuring Iann Dior	
1114	December 5	"Life Goes On"	BTS	
re	December 12	"Mood"	24kGoldn featuring Iann Dior	
re	December 19	"All I Want for Christmas Is You"	Mariah Carey	
1115	December 26	"Willow"	Taylor Swift	

== Number-one artists ==
List of number-one artists by total weeks at number one
Position	Artist	Weeks at No. 1
1	Roddy Ricch	18
2	DaBaby	7
3	24kGoldn	6
3	Iann Dior	6
5	Megan Thee Stallion	5
5	BTS	5
7	The Weeknd	4
7	Cardi B	4
9	Ariana Grande	3
10	Mariah Carey	2
10	Travis Scott	2
10	Nicki Minaj	2
10	Taylor Swift	2
14	Post Malone	1
14	Drake	1
14	Kid Cudi	1
14	Doja Cat	1
14	Justin Bieber	1
14	Beyoncé	1
14	Lady Gaga	1
14	6ix9ine	1
14	Harry Styles	1
14	Young Thug	1
14	M.I.A.	1
14	Jawsh 685	1
14	Jason Derulo	1

== See also ==
- List of Billboard 200 number-one albums of 2020
- List of Billboard Global 200 number ones of 2020
- List of Billboard Hot 100 top-ten singles in 2020
- List of Billboard Hot 100 number-one singles of the 2020s
- Billboard Year-End Hot 100 singles of 2020
- 2020 in American music
