= List of Billboard Global 200 number ones of 2020 =

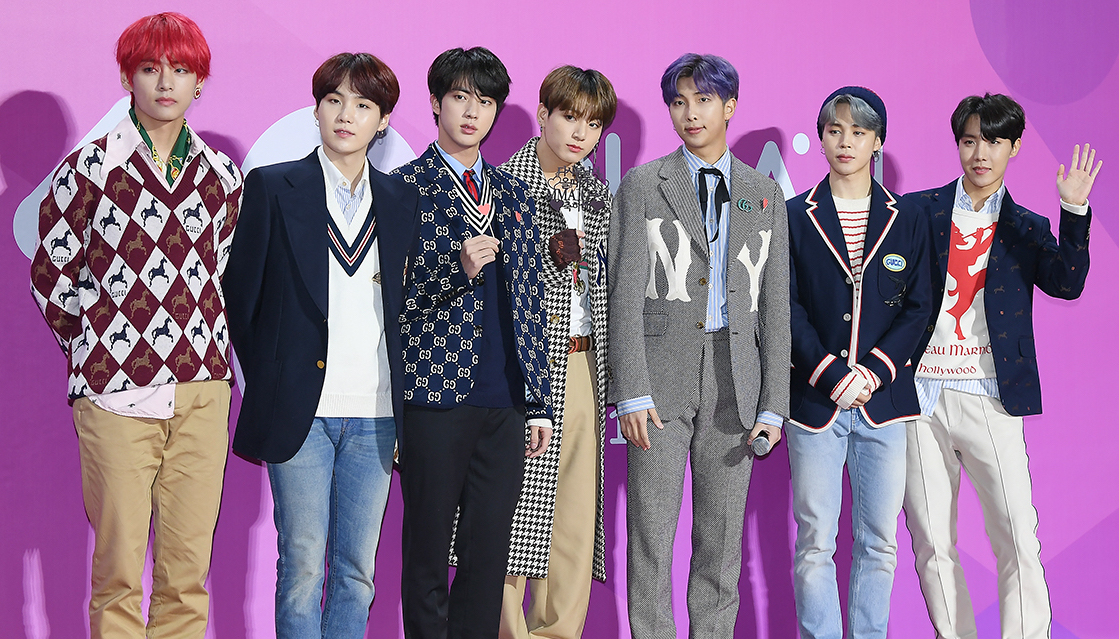
South Korean boy band BTS topped the Global 200 for five weeks and the Global Excl. US for seven weeks with three number-one singles: "Dynamite", "Savage Love (Laxed – Siren Beat)", and "Life Goes On".

The Billboard Global 200 is a chart that ranks the best-performing songs globally. Its data, published by Billboard magazine and compiled by MRC Data, is based on digital sales and online streaming from over 200 territories worldwide. Another similar chart is the Billboard Global Excl. US chart, which follows the same formula except it covers all territories excluding the US. The two charts launched on September 19, 2020.

On the Global 200, seven singles reached number one in 2020. Nine artists—Cardi B, Megan Thee Stallion, BTS, Jawsh 685, Jason Derulo, Ariana Grande, Bad Bunny, Jhay Cortez, and Mariah Carey—reached the top of the chart, all for the first time. BTS scored three number-one singles, the most of any artist, and spent a combined five weeks on top of the chart. Their song "Dynamite" tied with "WAP" by Cardi B featuring Megan Thee Stallion and "Dákiti" by Bad Bunny and Jhay Cortez as the longest-running number-one of the year, each leading the chart for three weeks.

On the Global Excl. US, six singles reached number one in 2020. Six artists—Maluma, BTS, Blackpink, Ariana Grande, Bad Bunny, and Jhay Cortez—reached the top of the chart, all for the first time. BTS scored two number-one singles, the most of any artist, and spent a combined seven weeks on top of the chart. Their song "Dynamite" was the longest-running number one of the year, leading the chart for six weeks.

== Chart history ==
Issue date	Billboard Global 200		Billboard Global Excl. US		Ref.
Issue date	Song	Artist(s)	Song	Artist(s)	Ref.
September 19	"WAP"	Cardi B featuring Megan Thee Stallion	"Hawái"	Maluma	
September 26	"WAP"	Cardi B featuring Megan Thee Stallion	"Dynamite"	BTS	
October 3	"Dynamite"	BTS	"Dynamite"	BTS	
October 10	"WAP"	Cardi B featuring Megan Thee Stallion	"Dynamite"	BTS	
October 17	"Savage Love (Laxed – Siren Beat)"	Jawsh 685, Jason Derulo, and BTS	"Lovesick Girls"	Blackpink	
October 24	"Dynamite"	BTS	"Dynamite"	BTS	
October 31	"Dynamite"	BTS	"Dynamite"	BTS	
November 7	"Positions"	Ariana Grande	"Positions"	Ariana Grande	
November 14	"Positions"	Ariana Grande	"Dákiti"	Bad Bunny and Jhay Cortez	
November 21	"Dákiti"	Bad Bunny and Jhay Cortez	"Dákiti"	Bad Bunny and Jhay Cortez	
November 28	"Dákiti"	Bad Bunny and Jhay Cortez	"Dákiti"	Bad Bunny and Jhay Cortez	
December 5	"Life Goes On"	BTS	"Life Goes On"	BTS	
December 12	"Dákiti"	Bad Bunny and Jhay Cortez	"Dákiti"	Bad Bunny and Jhay Cortez	
December 19	"All I Want for Christmas Is You"	Mariah Carey	"Dákiti"	Bad Bunny and Jhay Cortez	
December 26	"All I Want for Christmas Is You"	Mariah Carey	"Dynamite"	BTS	

== Number-one artists ==
List of number-one artists by total weeks at number one on Global 200
Position	Artist	Weeks at No. 1
1	BTS	5
2	Cardi B	3
2	Megan Thee Stallion	3
2	Bad Bunny	3
2	Jhay Cortez	3
2	Mariah Carey	2
2	Ariana Grande	2
2	Jawsh 685	1
2	Jason Derulo	1

List of number-one artists by total weeks at number one on Global Excl. US
Position	Artist	Weeks at No. 1
1	BTS	7
2	Bad Bunny	5
2	Jhay Cortez	5
3	Maluma	1
3	Blackpink	1
3	Ariana Grande	1

== See also ==
- 2020 in music
- List of Billboard 200 number-one albums of 2020
- List of Billboard Hot 100 number ones of 2020
