= List of Billboard 200 number-one albums of 2020 =

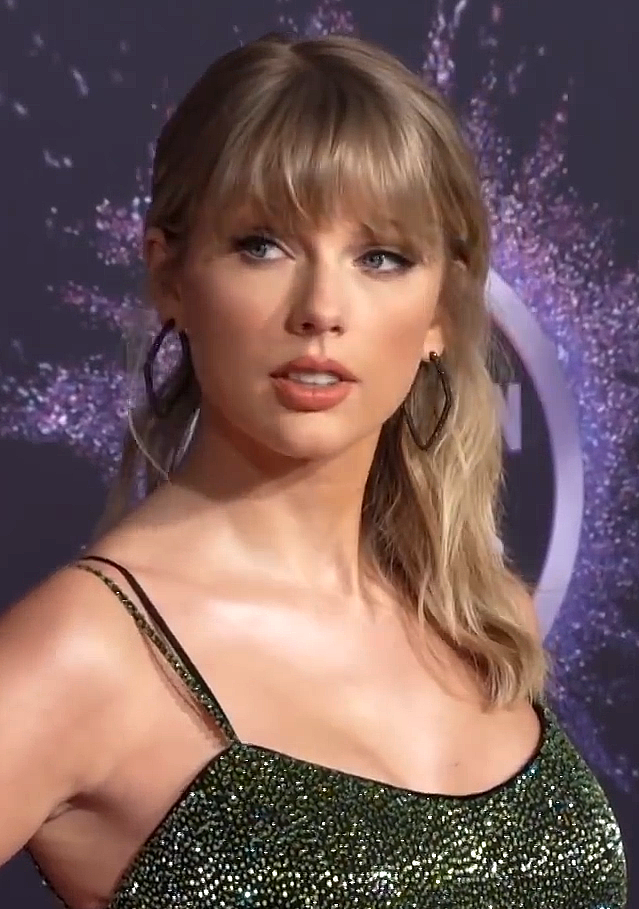
Folklore by Taylor Swift scored the biggest sales week of 2020. It was the longest running number-one and the best-selling album of the year.

This is a list of the albums ranked number one in the United States during 2020. The top-performing albums and EPs in the United States are ranked on the Billboard 200 chart, which is published by Billboard magazine. The data is compiled by Nielsen SoundScan based on each album's weekly physical and digital sales, as well as on-demand streaming and digital sales of their individual tracks.

Starting on the issue dated January 18, 2020, Billboard updated the methodology to compile the chart by incorporating official video data from YouTube, along with visual plays from streaming services like Apple Music, Spotify, Tidal, and Vevo.

Folklore by Taylor Swift was the best-selling album of 2020, and the longest-running number-one album of the year, spending eight weeks atop the chart. Hollywood's Bleeding (2019) by Post Malone was the best-performing album on the Billboard 200 Year-End chart of 2020. In this year, three acts scored two number-one albums each: BTS with Map of the Soul: 7 and Be, YoungBoy Never Broke Again with 38 Baby 2 and Top, and Swift with Folklore and Evermore.

== Chart history ==
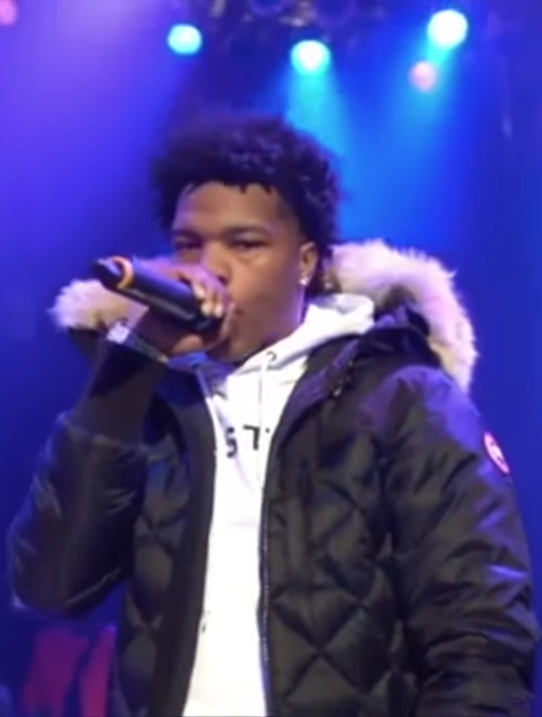
My Turn (2020) by Lil Baby spent five weeks atop the chart as his first number-one album.

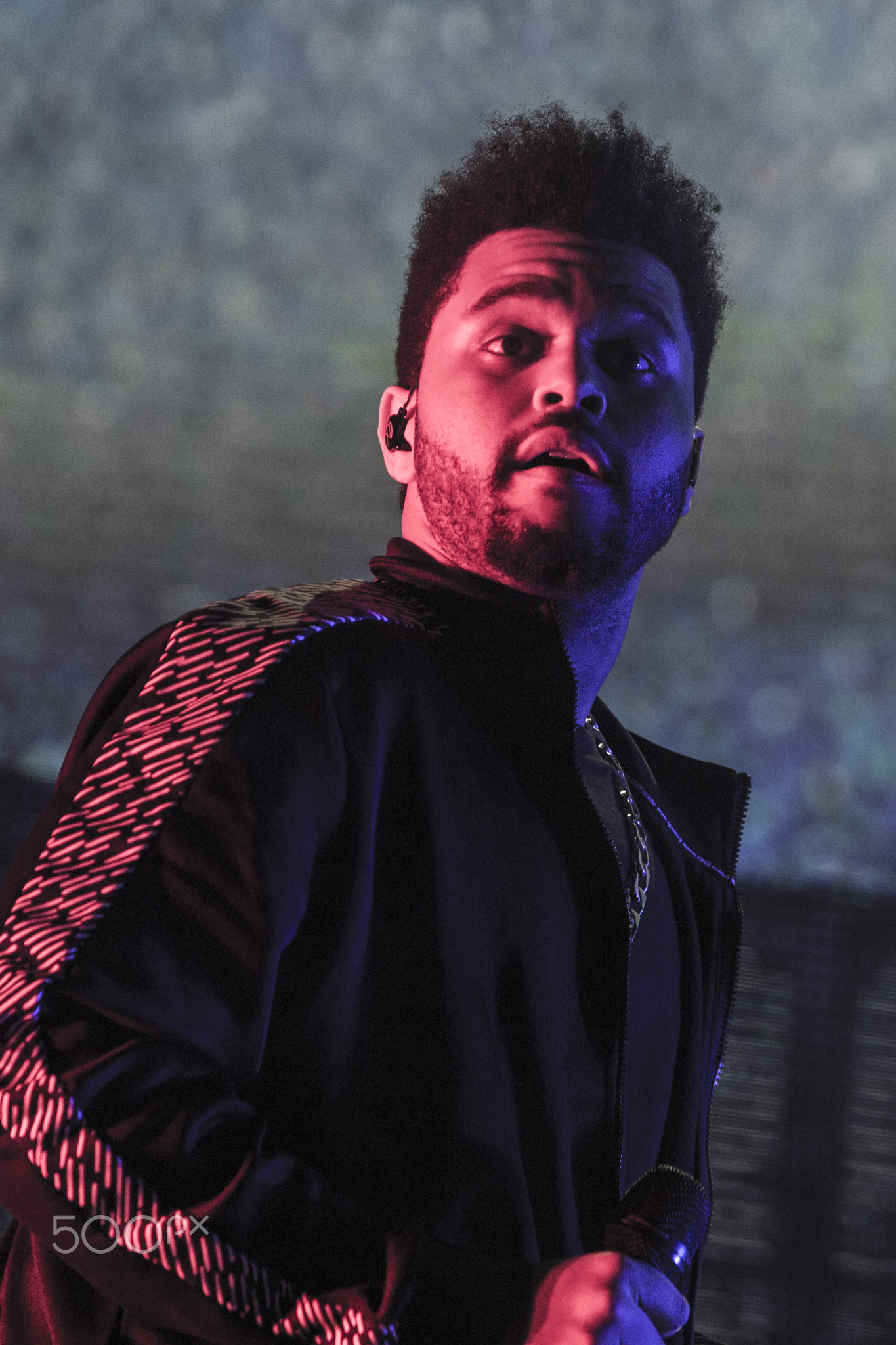
The Weeknd's After Hours spent four consecutive weeks atop the chart as his fourth number-one album.

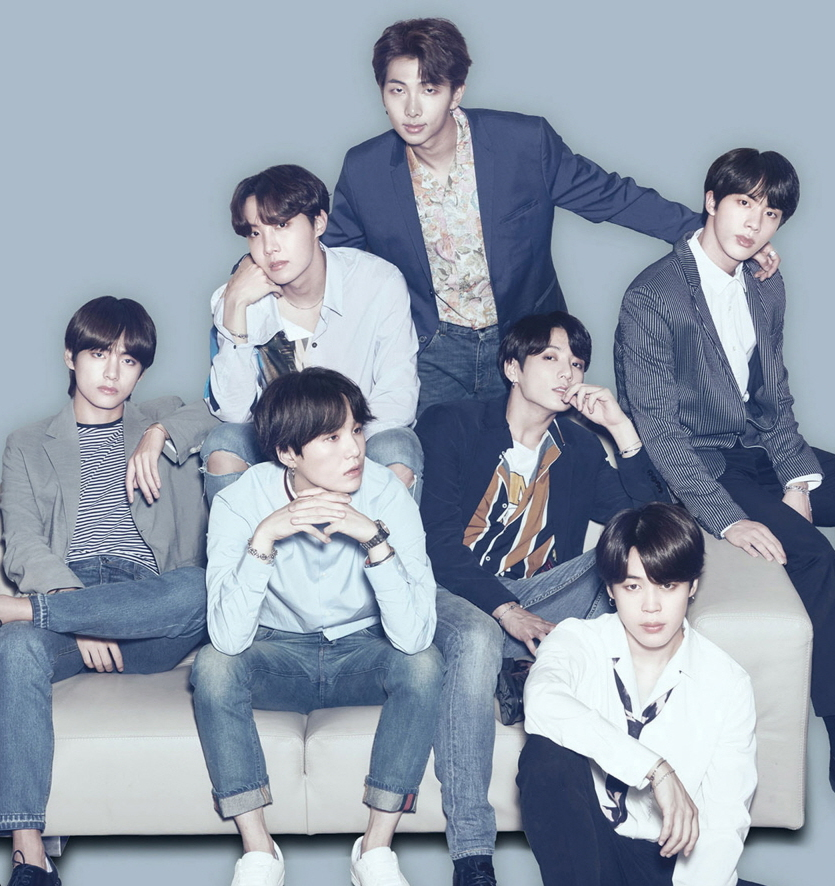
Korean boy group BTS garnered two number-one albums—Map of the Soul: 7 and Be.

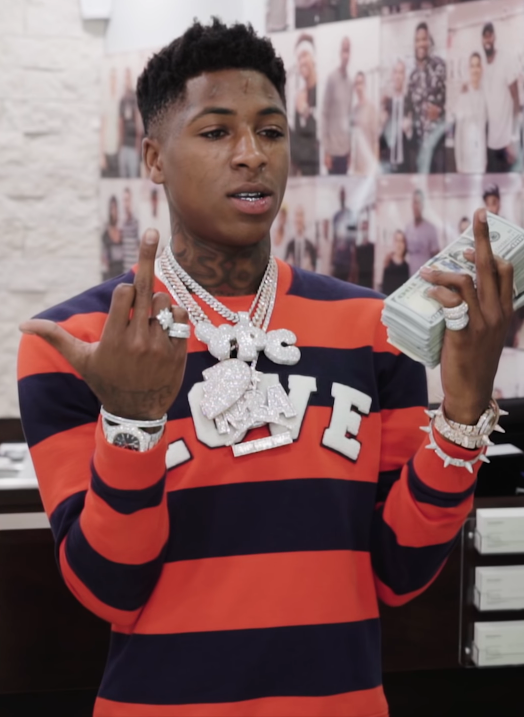
YoungBoy Never Broke Again had two number-one albums this year: 38 Baby 2 and Top.

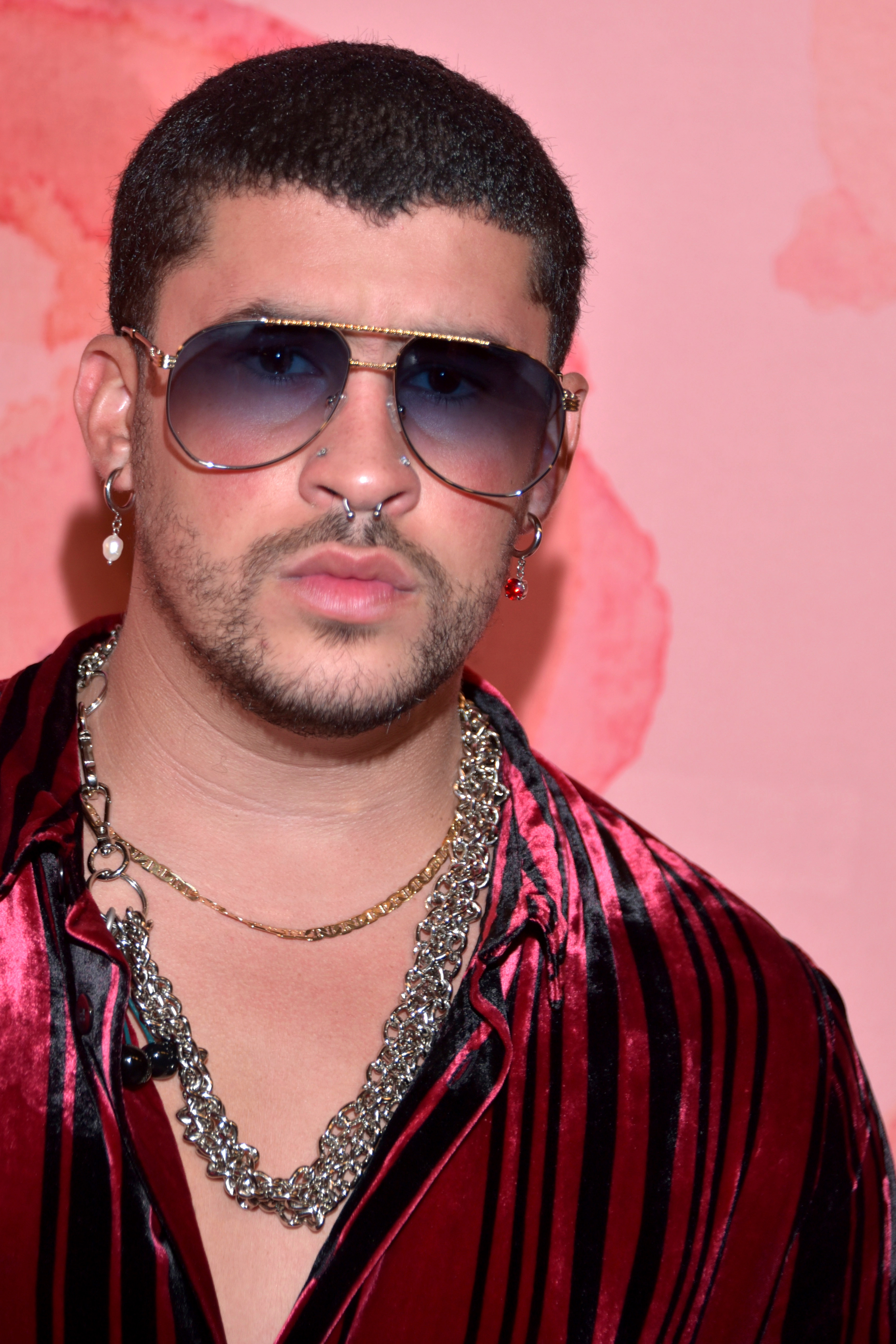
El Último Tour Del Mundo by Bad Bunny became the first all Spanish-language album to top the chart.

Hollywood's Bleeding (2019) by Post Malone was the best performing album on the 2020 Year-End list (December 2019 to November 2020), but its reign at number one on the Billboard 200 occurred in late 2019.

Issue date	Album	Artist(s)	Album- equivalent units	Ref.
January 4	Fine Line	Harry Styles	89,000	
January 11	JackBoys	JackBoys and Travis Scott	154,000	
January 18	Please Excuse Me for Being Antisocial	Roddy Ricch	97,000	
January 25	Rare	Selena Gomez	112,000	
February 1	Music to Be Murdered By	Eminem	279,000	
February 8	Please Excuse Me for Being Antisocial	Roddy Ricch	95,000	
February 15	Funeral	Lil Wayne	139,000	
February 22	Please Excuse Me for Being Antisocial	Roddy Ricch	79,000	
February 29	Changes	Justin Bieber	231,000	
March 7	Map of the Soul: 7	BTS	422,000	
March 14	My Turn	Lil Baby	197,000	
March 21	Eternal Atake	Lil Uzi Vert	288,000	
March 28	Eternal Atake	Lil Uzi Vert	247,000	
April 4	After Hours	The Weeknd	444,000	
April 11	After Hours	The Weeknd	138,000	
April 18	After Hours	The Weeknd	90,000	
April 25	After Hours	The Weeknd	75,000	
May 2	Blame It on Baby	DaBaby	124,000	
May 9	38 Baby 2	YoungBoy Never Broke Again	67,000	
May 16	Here and Now	Kenny Chesney	233,000	
May 23	Good Intentions	Nav	135,000	
May 30	High Off Life	Future	153,000	
June 6	Wunna	Gunna	111,000	
June 13	Chromatica	Lady Gaga	274,000	
June 20	My Turn	Lil Baby	65,000	
June 27	My Turn	Lil Baby	72,000	
July 4	My Turn	Lil Baby	70,000	
July 11	My Turn	Lil Baby	70,000	
July 18	Shoot for the Stars, Aim for the Moon	Pop Smoke	251,000	
July 25	Legends Never Die	Juice Wrld	497,000	
August 1	Legends Never Die	Juice Wrld	162,000	
August 8	Folklore	Taylor Swift	846,000	
August 15	Folklore	Taylor Swift	135,000	
August 22	Folklore	Taylor Swift	136,000	
August 29	Folklore	Taylor Swift	101,000	
September 5	Folklore	Taylor Swift	98,000	
September 12	Folklore	Taylor Swift	90,000	
September 19	Detroit 2	Big Sean	103,000	
September 26	Top	YoungBoy Never Broke Again	126,000	
October 3	Folklore	Taylor Swift	87,000	
October 10	Tickets to My Downfall	Machine Gun Kelly	126,000	
October 17	Savage Mode II	21 Savage and Metro Boomin	171,000	
October 24	Shoot for the Stars, Aim for the Moon	Pop Smoke	67,000	
October 31	Folklore	Taylor Swift	77,000	
November 7	What You See Is What You Get	Luke Combs	109,000	
November 14	Positions	Ariana Grande	174,000	
November 21	Positions	Ariana Grande	83,000	
November 28	Power Up	AC/DC	117,000	
December 5	Be	BTS	242,000	
December 12	El Último Tour Del Mundo	Bad Bunny	116,000	
December 19	Wonder	Shawn Mendes	89,000	
December 26	Evermore	Taylor Swift	329,000	

== Number-one artists ==
List of number-one artists by total weeks at number one
Position	Country	Artist	Weeks at No. 1
1	USA	Taylor Swift	9
2	USA	Lil Baby	5
3	Canada	The Weeknd	4
4	USA	Roddy Ricch	3
5	USA	Lil Uzi Vert	2
5	USA	YoungBoy Never Broke Again	2
5	USA	Pop Smoke	2
5	USA	Juice Wrld	2
5	USA	Ariana Grande	2
5	South Korea	BTS	2
6	UK	Harry Styles	1
6	USA	Jackboys	1
6	USA	Travis Scott	1
6	USA	Selena Gomez	1
6	USA	Eminem	1
6	USA	Lil Wayne	1
6	Canada	Justin Bieber	1
6	USA	DaBaby	1
6	USA	Kenny Chesney	1
6	Canada	Nav	1
6	USA	Future	1
6	USA	Gunna	1
6	USA	Lady Gaga	1
6	USA	Big Sean	1
6	USA	Machine Gun Kelly	1
6	UK	21 Savage	1
6	USA	Metro Boomin	1
6	USA	Luke Combs	1
6	Puerto Rico	Bad Bunny	1
6	Canada	Shawn Mendes	1

== See also ==
- List of Billboard Hot 100 number ones of 2020
- List of Billboard Global 200 number ones of 2020
- List of Billboard 200 number-one albums of the 2020s
- 2020 in American music
