= Life Goes On (BTS song) =

2020 single by BTS

Single by BTS

from the album Be
- Released: November 20, 2020
- Recorded: 2020
- Genre: Alternative hip hop; synth-pop
- Length: 3:27
- Label: Big Hit; Columbia
- Songwriters: Pdogg; RM; Antonina Armato; Chris James; Ruuth; J-Hope; Suga
- Producer: Pdogg

BTS singles chronology
"Savage Love (Laxed – Siren Beat)" (BTS remix) (2020)	"Life Goes On" (2020)	"Film Out" (2021)

Music videos
- "Life Goes On" on YouTube

Other versions
- "Life Goes On" on my pillow on YouTube "Life Goes On" in the forest on YouTube "Life Goes On" like an arrow on YouTube

"Life Goes On" is a song recorded by South Korean boy band BTS. It was released on November 20, 2020, through Big Hit Entertainment and Columbia Records as the lead single from the band's fifth Korean-language studio album Be (also released that same day).

"Life Goes On" debuted at number one on the Billboard Hot 100 and became the band's third number-one single in the United States as well as the first primarily Korean-language song to debut atop the chart.

== Background ==
Following the postponement of their Map of the Soul Tour due to the COVID-19 pandemic, the group started working on a new album. The group's label officially announced Be on September 27, 2020, stating via press release that the album "imparts a message of healing to the world by declaring, 'Even in the face of this new normality, our life goes on'". "Life Goes On" was announced as the album's lead single on October 30. J-Hope described the song's creation as:

We started this album off by getting together and asking what kind of story we wanted to tell. The end result of that conversation was, “Well, hey, we still have to live with this situation; we can’t give up.” And from there, “Life Goes On” was born, and then we got to work on the stories we each wanted to tell. I think it sounds more raw, since we tried to capture the emotions we felt living through the pandemic.

— J-Hope, Weverse Magazine.

== Music and lyrics ==
"Life Goes On" was written by band members J-Hope, RM, and Suga alongside Ruuth, Antonina Armato, Chris James and its producer Pdogg. The song has been described as an alternative hip hop and synth-pop song underlaid with an acoustic guitar. The folky production consists of 808 drums, electronic beats, melodic rhymes, a stripped-down melody accompanied by "acrobatic" vocals and harmonies on the chorus. Its lyrics have been described as uplifting and seeking to provide hope to fans during the pandemic. The song has been compared to the band's 2017 single "Spring Day".

== Commercial performance ==
"Life Goes On" debuted at number one on the Billboard Hot 100, on the chart issue dated December 5, 2020, becoming BTS' third number-one single in the United States in exactly three months, following "Dynamite" in September and "Savage Love (Laxed – Siren Beat) (BTS Remix)" in October. This marked the fastest accumulation of three number-one songs on the chart in 42 years since the Bee Gees, who previously achieved the feat in two months and three weeks with "How Deep Is Your Love", "Stayin' Alive", and "Night Fever" from the Saturday Night Fever soundtrack between December 1977 and March 1978. The song topped the Digital Songs chart issue of the same date, having sold 150,000 units (pure sales) in its opening week, including 129,000 digital downloads and 20,000 physical copies. It is the first Korean language song in Hot 100 history to debut atop the chart, as well as the first song sung predominantly in a non-English language since Luis Fonsi and Daddy Yankee's "Despacito" remix with Justin Bieber in 2017. The following week, "Life Goes On" charted at number 28, marking the second-largest drop from number one by a song in Hot 100 history at the time, behind only 6ix9ine and Nicki Minaj's "Trollz", which charted at number 34 in its second week. This eventually became the third-largest drop from number one when Taylor Swift's "Willow" charted at number 38 in its second week, on the January 2, 2021, chart issue, surpassing "Trollz"' record. "Life Goes On" charted at number 93 in its third week and left the Hot 100 afterwards.

Supported mainly by sales and streaming, "Life Goes On" received "minimal" US radioplay in comparison to its predecessor "Dynamite", prompting discussions from publications such as Slate and The Atlantic about, among other things, the difficulties facing non-English-language performing/speaking artists to break into the mainstream. Senior Culture editor for The Atlantic Lenika Cruz was unsurprised by the "lackluster radio spins", but felt that this made the single's debut at number one "that much more unbelievable" because while "'Dynamite' was everywhere...'Life Goes On' is currently the biggest song on the charts, released by the biggest musical group in the world—and there's a good chance you haven't heard it." She acknowledged that "non-Korean-speaking audiences would, of course, not understand most of the lyrics", but believed that the song "could resonate with many listeners in a difficult year" if given the chance by radio. After outlining other performance differences between "Dynamite" and "Life Goes On" and possible influencing factors, Slate's Chris Molanphy concluded "One thing we do know, basically indisputably, is that radio, the third component of the Hot 100, decidedly prefers BTS singing in English." The "stark disparity" in radioplay between the former, which opened to an 11.6 million radio audience, and the latter, which opened to a 410,000 audience, supported his observations. Molanphy also pointed out that "Dynamite"'s holding at its peak of number 11 on the Radio Songs chart—the only other mostly-Korean song to previously peak on the chart was Psy's "Gangnam Style" which reached number 12 in 2012—suggested that the band would "fall short of the radio Top 10, even after singing in English." Echoing sentiments similar to Molanphy's findings, Cruz additionally wrote that "The takeaway seems clear: If you don’t primarily perform in English, you need to outsell your closest competitors many times over—or secure a radio-friendly collaboration or remix—to have a shot at reaching No. 1 on the Hot 100."

== Music videos ==
=== Original ===
Two teaser trailers preceded the music video. The first, released on YouTube on November 17, 2020, is a 26-second long clip—accompanied by "ambient piano and guitar music"—of the band outdoors at night, seated around a campfire, then indoors watching a video while dressed in pajamas and loungewear. Jungkook's name appears in the teaser's end credits as the music video director. The second, released the following day, is a 22-second long clip comprising black and white stills of the individual band members set to audio of them singing the lyrics "'I remember, I remember' over wistful pop production." A photo of Jungkook holding a camera and staring into its viewfinder, in honor of his role as director, closes out the visual.

Scene from the "Life Goes On" music video depicting BTS passing time together in their shared dorm playing videogames while living in isolation during the COVID-19 pandemic

The full four-minute-long music video premiered on YouTube on November 19, 2020. More personal and "sentimental" in nature, it presents the band living together in isolation in their dorm during the COVID-19 pandemic—in one scene RM "wistfully wipes a couple of fingers' worth of dust off his bicycle seat" as he can no longer participate in that outdoor activity—having a pajama party, watching movies, and playing video games, intercut with a clip of V driving his bandmates around South Korea and eventually past Seoul Olympic Stadium—he "peers out the window" and "longingly stares" at the venue as they pass it—where the band was slated to kickoff their Map of the Soul Tour several months prior, before it was ultimately cancelled due to the pandemic. The latter part of the video features a black and white sequence of the band envisioning themselves singing the song in the empty stadium "with stage lights shining down on them" as the video fades out. At a press conference held the day of Be's release, Jungkook said that his intent with the music video was to express the "sadness and the longing" the band felt due to the tour's cancellation "and because we couldn't see ARMY much".

The video received over 71.6 million views in its first 24 hours of release to become the fifth-most viewed YouTube video within that period at the time. Just over two days later, it became BTS' 27th music video to surpass 100 million views, extending the band's record as the Korean artist with the most music videos over 100 million views. The music video became the band's 15th to cross the 300 and 400 million views milestones, doing so in March and November 2021 respectively.

=== Alternate versions ===
In the days that followed, three alternate versions of the music video, titled "on my pillow", "in the forest", and "like an arrow" respectively, were released. The "on my pillow" version was uploaded to YouTube on November 21, 2020. An extended version of the bedroom scene from the original music video, it shows the band lounging on two beds in their pajamas, singing the song, and taking photos of one another, and ends with them standing atop the beds while singing together. Filmed in an outdoor setting, the "in the forest" version followed on November 25 and features the band singing the song on a green lawn against the backdrop of a forest and sunny skies. The final version, "like an arrow", was released on November 29 and comprises various black and white photo stills, some of which were first seen in the second teaser trailer, depicting behind-the-scenes cuts from all four music videos, as well as candid shots of the band, set to the song's audio.

== Accolades ==
Awards and nominations for "Life Goes On"
Year	Organization	Award	Result	Ref.
2020	Joox Malaysia Top Music Awards	Most Popular song: K-Pop	Won	
2021	Gaon Chart Music Awards	Song of the Year – November	Won	

Music program awards
Program	Date	Ref.
Show! Music Core	November 28, 2020	
Show! Music Core	December 5, 2020	
Show! Music Core	December 12, 2020	
Show! Music Core	January 2, 2021	
Show! Music Core	January 9, 2021	
Show! Music Core	January 16, 2021	
Inkigayo	November 29, 2020	
Inkigayo	December 6, 2020	
Inkigayo	December 13, 2020	

Melon Popularity Award
Award	Date (2020)	Ref.
Weekly Popularity Award	November 30	
Weekly Popularity Award	December 7	
Weekly Popularity Award	December 14	
Weekly Popularity Award	December 21	
Weekly Popularity Award	December 28	

== Live performances ==
BTS performed "Life Goes On"—and "Dynamite"—at the American Music Awards on November 22, 2020. The following day, two pre-recorded performances of the song were shown on American television programs. The first, on Good Morning America, featured the group performing inside a decorated house, wearing pajamas and bathrobes. The second performance was broadcast during The Late Late Show with James Corden. The group sang the song while dressed in pajamas again, this time on a set consisting of a series of conjoined living rooms. The performance ended with them unboxing gifts in a Christmas-themed room. Elle's Ariana Yaptangco said that the group "traded in their regular top-notch choreography to show off their impressive acting skills." BTS also performed "Life Goes On" as part of their four-song set at the Melon Music Awards on December 5, and their three-song set for the Mnet Asian Music Awards (MAMA) on December 6. Suga, who was recovering from shoulder surgery at the time and did not attend in person, appeared as a hologram for the MAMA performance.

== Credits and personnel ==
Credits adapted from Big Hit.

- BTS – vocals
  - J-Hope – songwriter
  - RM – songwriter
  - Suga – songwriter
- Pdogg – producer, songwriter
- Antonina Armato – songwriter
- Chris James – songwriter
- Ruuth – songwriter

== Charts ==
=== Weekly charts ===
Weekly chart performance
Chart (2020–2022)	Peak position
Argentina Hot 100 (Billboard)	59
Australia (ARIA)	27
Austria (Ö3 Austria Top 40)	34
Belgium (Ultratip Bubbling Under Flanders)	16
Canada Hot 100 (Billboard)	8
Czech Republic Singles Digital (ČNS IFPI)	49
Euro Digital Song Sales (Billboard)	2
France (SNEP)	80
Germany (GfK)	37
Global 200 (Billboard)	1
Greece International (IFPI)	20
Hungary (Single Top 40)	1
India International Singles (IMI)	20
Ireland (IRMA)	19
Italy (FIMI)	61
Japan Hot 100 (Billboard)	10
Japan Combined Singles (Oricon)	10
Lithuania (AGATA)	3
Malaysia (RIM)	1
Mexico Airplay (Billboard)	50
Netherlands (Single Top 100)	71
New Zealand (Recorded Music NZ)	33
Scotland Singles (Official Charts)	1
Singapore (RIAS)	1
Slovakia Singles Digital (ČNS IFPI)	30
South Korea (Gaon)	3
South Korea (K-pop Hot 100)	2
Spain (PROMUSICAE)	76
Sweden (Sverigetopplistan)	87
Switzerland (Schweizer Hitparade)	23
UK Singles (Official Charts)	10
UK Indie (Official Charts)	1
US Billboard Hot 100	1
US World Digital Song Sales (Billboard)	1
US Rolling Stone Top 100	11
Vietnam (Vietnam Hot 100)	70

=== Year-end charts ===
Year-end chart performance
Chart (2020)	Position
Hungary (Single Top 40)	83
South Korea (Gaon)	188
Chart (2021)	Position
Global 200 (Billboard)	133
Japan (Japan Hot 100)	61
South Korea (Gaon)	33

== Certifications ==
Certifications
Region	Certification	Certified units/sales
New Zealand (RMNZ)	Gold	15,000^{‡}
United States (RIAA)	Gold	500,000^{‡}
Streaming
Japan (RIAJ)	Platinum	100,000,000^{†}
South Korea (KMCA)	Platinum	100,000,000^{†}
^{‡} Sales+streaming figures based on certification alone.^{†} Streaming-only figures based on certification alone.

== Release history ==
Region	Date	Format	Label	Ref.
Various	November 20, 2020	Digital download; streaming	Big Hit	
United States	November 20, 2020	7-inch; cassette	Columbia	

== See also ==
- List of Billboard Global 200 number ones of 2020
- List of Billboard Hot 100 number ones of 2020
- List of Billboard Hot 100 number-one singles of the 2020s
- List of Billboard Hot 100 top-ten singles in 2020
- List of number-one songs of 2020 (Malaysia)
- List of number-one songs of 2020 (Singapore)
