= Be (BTS album) =

- Digital cover

Studio album by BTS
- Released: November 20, 2020
- Recorded: 2020
- Studios: Analog Lab; Big Hit; Dogg Bounce; Echo Bar (North Hollywood, CA); Genius Lab; Henson (Los Angeles, CA); Hope World; RKive; Schmuzik
- Genre: Pop
- Length: 28:30
- Languages: Korean; English
- Label: Big Hit Entertainment
- Producer: Pdogg

BTS chronology
Map of the Soul: 7 – The Journey (2020)	Be (2020)	BTS, the Best (2021)

Singles from Be
- 1. "Life Goes On" Released: November 20, 2020

Be is the fifth Korean-language and the ninth overall studio album by South Korean boy band BTS. It was released on November 20, 2020, through Big Hit Entertainment, nine months after its predecessor, Map of the Soul: 7 (2020). Created in response to the COVID-19 pandemic, Be was inspired by BTS's perspective of life during the pandemic. The record sees the band members contributing to various aspects of album-making process including songwriting, development, production, and visual design.

Be is primarily a pop record, encompassing hip hop, EDM, and disco genres with elements of synth-pop, funk, and R&B. Described by BTS as "a letter of hope", the lyrics are about comfort, loneliness, anxiety, sadness, hope, connection, and joy. Critics hailed the album's pop sound and the eclectic experimentation of musical styles, with many praising its authenticity and simplicity. A few others expressed mixed feelings and found it unadventurous. The album was preceded by the standalone single "Dynamite", which marked BTS's first number-one song on the US Billboard Hot 100. It was followed by the lead single of Be, "Life Goes On", which also debuted atop the Hot 100, becoming BTS's third consecutive chart-topper in the United States.

The album was BTS's fifth to debut at number one on the Billboard 200, making BTS the fastest group to earn five chart-topping albums in the United States since the Beatles. Elsewhere, the album topped charts in Canada, Denmark, Japan, Lithuania, New Zealand, Norway, Poland, the Republic of Ireland, South Korea, and Wallonia; and peaked within the top 10 of 14 other territories. The album has since been certified triple million by the Korea Music Content Association (KMCA) and platinum by the Recording Industry Association of Japan (RIAJ). BTS promoted Be with performances at the American Music Awards and television programs, including The Late Late Show with James Corden.

== Background ==
BTS released their fourth Korean-language studio album, Map of the Soul: 7, in February 2020, to critical and commercial acclaim. In support of the album, the band was slated to begin the concert tour, Map of the Soul Tour in April 2020, but the tour was postponed following the COVID-19 pandemic. During a YouTube broadcast, band member RM revealed that BTS were working on a new album. He hinted that they would be sharing the preparation process of the forthcoming album through subsequent self-documented videos as part of their initiative to interact with the fans during the lockdown. In subsequent broadcasts, it was revealed that the album would be written and produced by the band members. In addition to writing songs for the album, the band members were heavily involved in the overall production process, undertaking the role of project managers in various fields, which included developing concepts, themes, as well as its visual design. Jimin was responsible for A&R, acting as a link between the group and their management label. Suga, V, and J-Hope handled the production together with Jin and Jungkook; the latter was also responsible for directing the music video. V and RM supervised the graphics and design of the album. Speaking about the album in an interview with Teen Vogue, BTS stated: "An increase of direct participation in the album-making process allowed us to explore more aspects of our music and creativity."

== Music and lyrics ==
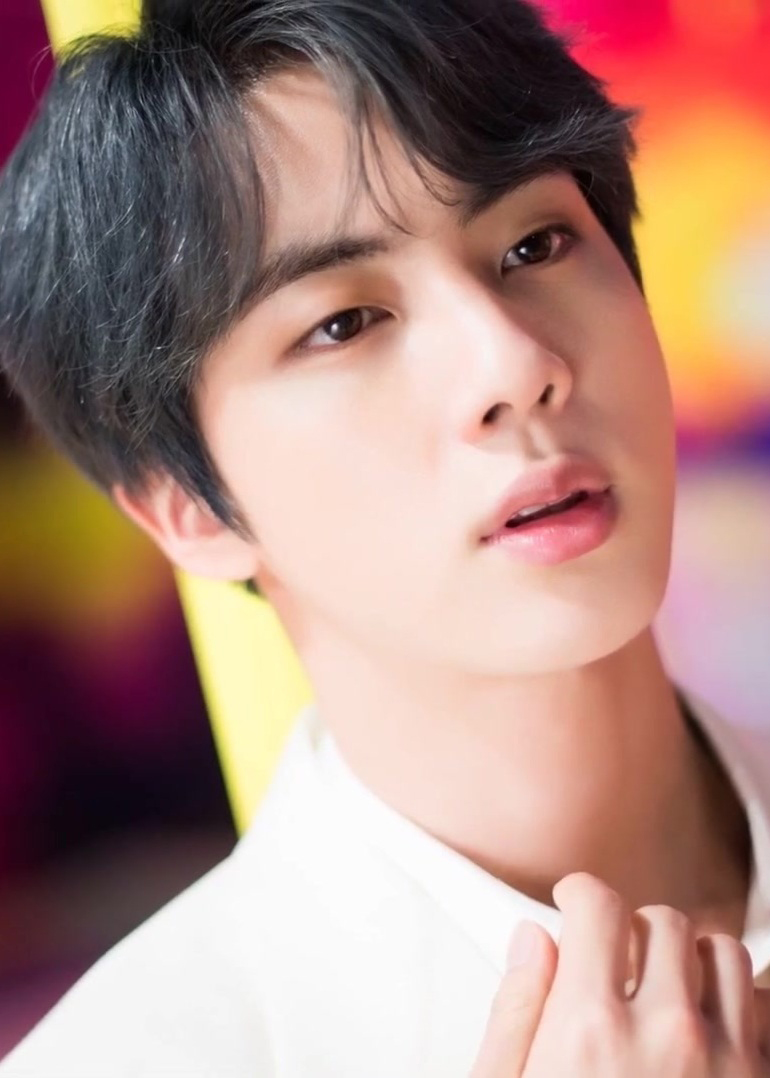
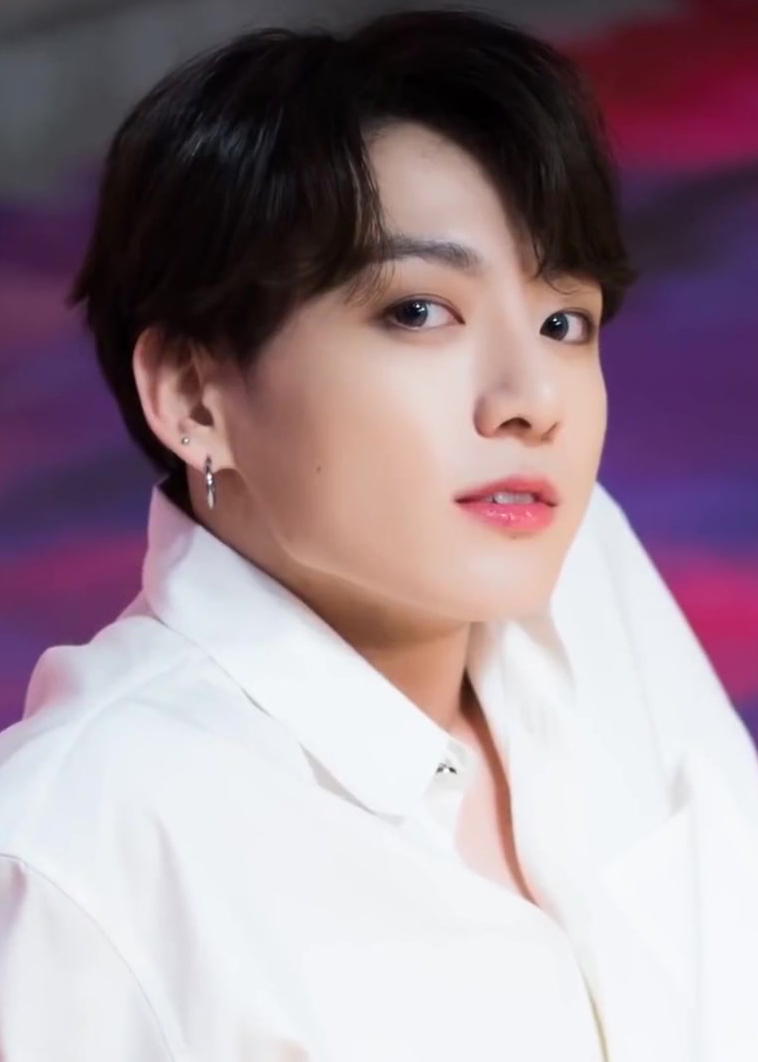
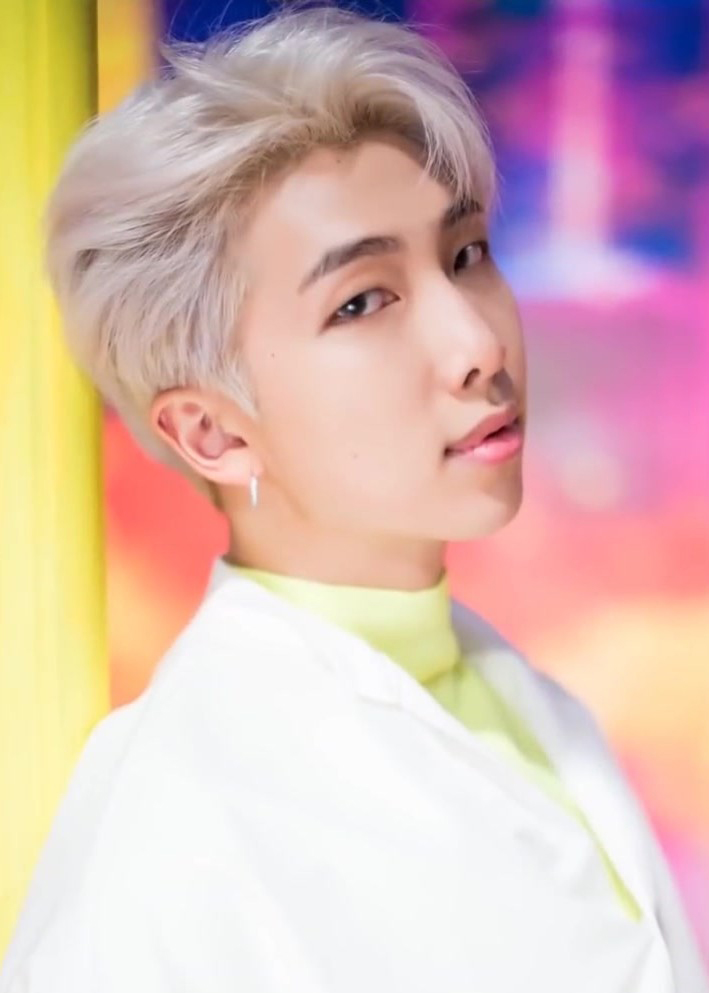
"Stay" features vocals and writing credits from BTS members Jin (pictured left), Jungkook (pictured middle) and RM (pictured right).

Be is primarily a pop record, encompassing hip hop, EDM, and disco genres with synth-pop, neo soul, funk, R&B, 1970s, 1980s, 1990s, and 2010s mainstream music elements. Vox called Be "a loudly retro mix of pop sounds ranging from frothy to funky, melancholic to mellow, filtered through a lens of determined positivity". The album is 28 minutes and 30 seconds long and features eight songs. It makes heavy use of acoustic guitars, pianos, funk bass, drum machines, horns, and sentimental string instruments.

BTS took inspiration from the emotions they felt during the pandemic, to write songs for the album and convey their thoughts. Created out of frustration, anxiety, and powerlessness, the album title "Be" stands for "being" and encapsulates BTS's reflection on the present times. As opposed to the vast atmospherics and psychoanalytical themes that can be found in the band's previous works, Be is lyrically inspired by the COVID-19 pandemic, with BTS describing it as "a letter of hope" during the quarantine era. The record starts off slow with "warm, soothing ballad-esque comforts", before picking up pace in the second half with "some of the band's more refined, savvy and uplifting pop yet". The album expands on a wide range of emotions, exploring themes of comfort, loneliness, anxiety, depression, burn-out, fear, frustration, restlessness, sadness, hope, connection, resolve, and joy. Several reviewers, including Rolling Stone's Jeff Benjamin, observed that the album explores the different moods that people are feeling during the unprecedented times. Dani Blum of Pitchfork said that the album "fixates on the frustration and grief of life in quarantine, sifting through the blurry days to construct a new form of intimacy".

=== Songs ===
"Blue & Grey"
A 25-second sample of the pre-chorus and chorus of "Blue & Grey", a soft pop ballad, driven by sparse instrumental production and breathy vocals. The lyrics address themes that include depression and anxiety.

The album opens with the ruminative "Life Goes On", a midtempo alternative hip hop and synth-pop song underlaid with an acoustic guitar. Pertaining to a mellow vibe, the song has a folksy, stripped-down sound. It makes use electronic beats, 808 drums, and melodic rhymes, with "acrobatic" vocals and harmonies on the chorus. The lyrics deal with the COVID-19 pandemic and speak of being hopeful for better times. RM said that the track has "a simple message but a profound truth". The second track, "Fly to My Room" is a 1990s-inspired R&B, neo soul, and pop song with gospel and synth-pop elements. Performed by Jimin, V, J-Hope, and Suga, the vulnerable track features "breathy" vocals and falsettos. The former two switch back and forth in the verses and chorus, while the latter two rap in a "sing-song" style. The song employs a sparse production for which '70s piano, funky keyboards, and trap programmed drum beats provide minimalist instrumentation. Lyrically, the track is about loneliness and confinement, and talks about mentally being able to escape the monotony of quarantine life. The melancholic, slow-jam number "Blue & Grey" is a soft pop ballad that relies a "sparse-yet-tender" production. Set in a cinematic arrangement of minor chords that includes acoustic guitar, twinkling pianos, and wistful strings, the emotional track makes use of "breathy" and "crooning" vocals to confess about fear, depression, burn-out, and pandemic-induced loneliness, using the colors blue and grey. Los Angeles Times labelled it as "one of the exemplary songs of the 'pandemic-pop' era" that acts as "a ribbon of immaculate bedroom emo, gorgeously harmonized but never show-offy or overpowering".

The fourth track is a non-musical spoken worded "Skit" about BTS's first number one song on the US Billboard Hot 100, which serves an interlude to separate the album into two parts. "Telepathy" is a playful 1980s-inflected disco and funk song that makes use of an electronic production. The song is driven by '70s beats, Auto-Tuned vocals, and G-funk whistles. Featuring a groovy bassline, it employs synth bass, "stacked-up" vocal harmonies, a cowbell, and jam band percussion in its production. The lyrics detail the connection that one can feel from someone despite physical distance and sees BTS admitting to the disorientation caused by excessive free time. "Dis-ease" is an old-school hip hop number that is accompanied by funk-laced horns and guitars. Lyrically, it delivers a message of strength and contains puns on the different forms of illnesses such as, BTS's addiction to work. Features brassy instrumentals, drums, and a sparse scratching sound, the track begins with a jazz guitar before shifting to a chopped and screwed drum breakdown. The seventh track, "Stay", performed by Jungkook, Jin, and RM, is a future house, dance-pop, and EDM song with 1990s and 2010s influences. Incorporating heavy bass and an instrumental chorus, the song references how technology binds the band together with listeners. The album closes with the summer anthem, "Dynamite", a 1970s-flavoured disco-pop song with elements of funk, soul and bubblegum pop. The upbeat production employs snapping handclaps, bounces, grooves, and beats. The track features a funky bassline, vocal harmonies, and falsettos, with brass, keyboard chords, guitar sound. Lyrically, it is about the joy and appreciation of little things that makes life valuable.

== Release and promotion ==
On August 13, 2020, Big Hit Entertainment held a corporate briefing where the agency confirmed that the new album would be released in the fourth quarter of that year. On September 27, Big Hit uploaded a teaser poster with the album's name, also announcing the release date. Preorders for the deluxe edition began the following day. On October 30, BTS teased the title of the album's lead single "Life Goes On" on Twitter. On November 10, the band posted the album's track list and digital cover. Three days later, they held an unboxing session of the album which was broadcast live on their YouTube channel. Nine months after Map of the Soul: 7, Be was released worldwide on November 20, 2020, through Big Hit, in conjunction with a music video for "Life Goes On".

An "Essential Edition" of the album was announced by Big Hit on January 24, 2021, as a thank-you to fans for the milestones the band achieved. Pre-orders for this version opened on January 25. The album retained the same eight-song tracklist as the deluxe edition, but the packaging's internal components contained some differences. "Surprise gifts" for the band's fandom were sequentially unveiled in the days leading up to the release on February 19.

=== Live performances ===
BTS promoted the album with a performance at the Seoul Olympic Stadium in 2020.

On November 22, 2020, BTS performed "Life Goes On" for the first time at the American Music Awards of 2020, alongside "Dynamite". The band performed it from the Seoul Olympic Stadium in matching black and white outfits. The following day, they performed "Life Goes On" on Good Morning America and The Late Late Show with James Corden. BTS made their MTV Unplugged debut on the February 23, 2021 special edition of the show titled MTV Unplugged Presents: BTS. The group's half-hour long "historic appearance", as the first Korean act to headline the series, saw them perform a stripped back, five-song setlist consisting of four tracks off the album—"Telepathy", "Blue & Grey", "Life Goes On", and "Dynamite"—and a "surprise cover" of Coldplay's "Fix You". This marked the live premiere of the first two tracks, B-sides that the group had yet to perform since the album's release. Each performance was filmed on a different set to match the mood of the song being sung, including an "arcade[-like] gameroom" for Telepathy, and "an indoor field...with blue and grey flowers" for "Blue & Grey". For the third and fourth tracks, the group was accompanied by a live four-piece band, Ghost, comprising a drummer, guitarist, bassist and keyboardist. Consequence of Sound's Mary Siroky reviewed the appearance favorably, writing that "the BTS boys brought their A-game...keeping their virtual performances new and exciting, refusing to let their distance from an audience push them into anything repetitive or mundane". Siroky singled out Jin and Jimin's vocals on "Blue & Grey", noting how the two "soared in their upper registers, offering lush harmonies throughout".

== Critical reception ==
Professional ratings
Aggregate scores
Source	Rating
AnyDecentMusic?	7.3/10
Metacritic	80/100
Review scores
Source	Rating
AllMusic	4/5 stars
Clash	7/10
Consequence of Sound	B+
Exclaim!	9/10
The Independent	4/5 stars
NME	4/5 stars
PopMatters	8/10
Pitchfork	7/10
Rolling Stone	3.5/5 stars
Slant Magazine	3/5 stars

According to the review aggregator Metacritic, Be received "generally favorable reviews" based on a weighted average score of 80 out of 100 from 12 critic scores. Aggregator AnyDecentMusic? gave it 7.3 out of 10, based on their assessment of the critical consensus.

In her review for PopMatters, Ana Clara Ribeiro felt Be was a timeless pop offering that incorporated rap to create a sound that established BTS's legacy. Ribeiro said that although BTS's sonic identity was rap, she attributed Be's success to the band's vocalists. Evening Standard's Jochan Embley called the album "exquisitely produced" with "near faultless" vocal performances, a sentiment echoed by The Arts Desk's critic Peter Quinn in his review for the album. Reviewers were impressed with the experimentation of diverse musical styles, including Embley, Lenika Cruz of The Atlantic, and Annabel Nugent of The Independent, who said that the album "avoids the pitfall of sounding like a checklist". Vox's Aja Romano described it as a "sublime" album full of "seamless litany of bops intended to commemorate and celebrate getting through the Covid-19 pandemic", with Lexi Lane of NBC News calling it BTS's "brightest and most unifying album yet". Exclaim! writer Eva Zhu felt that the departure of Be towards a more "laidback" sound compared to the band's usual offerings was appealing to newer audience.

Critics lauded the album's lyrical authenticity, intimacy, and simple message. Writing for NME, Rhian Daly described Be as the "most accurate musical encapsulation of the roller coaster that is pandemic life so far" in which the group strikes a "perfect balance between encouragement and reassurance". In an enthusiastic review, AllMusic's Neil Z. Yeung complimented BTS for their openness and intimacy in the lyrics, calling the album an inspiring soundtrack: "Despite its brief runtime, Be is an expert snapshot of time and place, a document of a worldwide event that manages to strengthen their connection to their listeners and push their songcraft forward with focus, heart, and humanity." Katie Goh of i-D agreed and viewed it as a "the intimate, introspective lockdown project" that served as an honest depiction of people's struggles during 2020. Reviewers such as Emma Saletta of MTV News, have cited the record as an offering of hope for the future, with Benjamin calling it as BTS's "most on-brand album", and Siroky dubbing it as "the cozy comedown" which "brings the listener home in every sense, inviting us into the world of these seven young men in a way none of their other albums have so far". Stereogum, Time, and The Quietus found the album soothing, and praised the introspective lyricism about isolation and quarantine.

A few reviewers found the album unadventurous. For Clash, Malvika Padin asserted that the album is "far simpler" than the band's past releases "yet equally comforting" but criticized its lack of appeal to the casual listeners". In the Los Angeles Times, August Brown deemed Be as the group's "most overt attempt to ascend the U.S. pop charts", but he remained favorable towards BTS's songwriting abilities, describing the album as "a trim, reflective and modest LP about resilience, written to meet a weary global mood". In a mixed review for Slant Magazine, Sophia Ordaz acknowledged the album for its simple and lucid message, but argued that it exchanged "overstimulating spectacle for low-key introspection".

== Accolades ==
Awards and nominations for BE
Organization	Year	Award	Result	Ref.
Circle Chart Music Awards	2021	Album of the Year – 4th Quarter	Won	,
Melon Music Awards	2021	Album of the Year	Nominated	
MAMA Awards	2021	Album of the year	Won	
Golden Disc Awards	2022	Disc Daesang	Won	
Golden Disc Awards	2022	Disc Bonsang	Won	

== Commercial performance ==
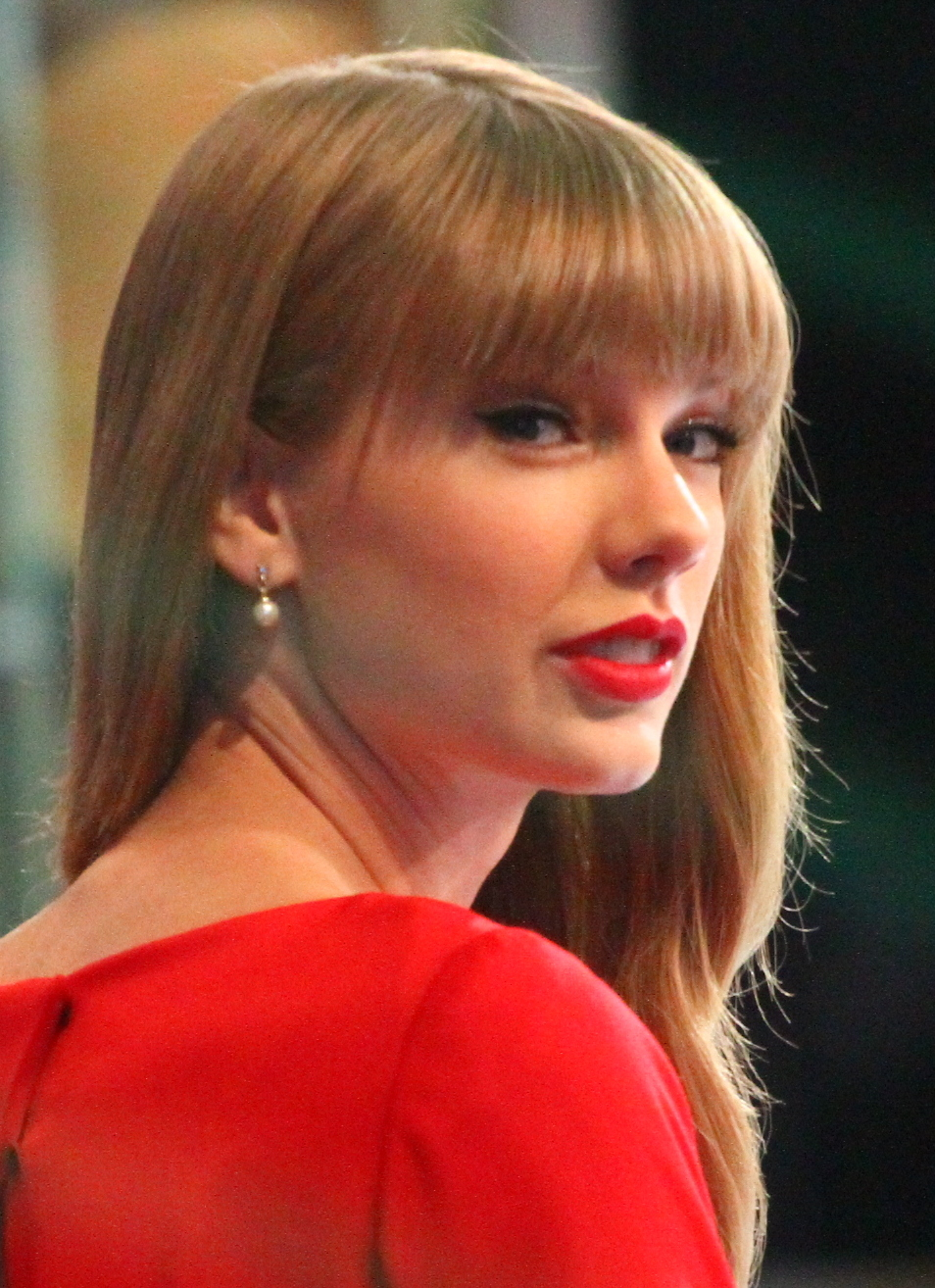
BTS became the only act apart from Taylor Swift (pictured) to debut at number one on the Hot 100 and Billboard 200 simultaneously.

Be debuted atop the US Billboard 200 with 242,000 album-equivalent units, including 177,000 sales, on the chart dated December 5, 2020. The album is BTS's fifth chart-topper in the United States, making BTS the fastest group to earn five number-one albums since the Beatles between 1966 and 1968, as well as the first group to have two chart-topping albums in the country in 2020. Its lead single "Life Goes On" debuted atop the Billboard Hot 100 with 150,000 downloads and 14.9 million U.S. streams, becoming the band's third number-one song following "Dynamite" and "Savage Love (Laxed – Siren Beat)" remix. With this, BTS became the fastest group in over 42 years to earn three number-one songs in a span of three months since the Bee Gees. They became the second act following Ariana Grande to score three Hot 100 number one entries in 2020, as well as the first group to land two number-one debuts on the chart. "Life Goes On" marked the first song not sung in an English language to debut atop the chart. BTS became the only act apart from Taylor Swift to debut at number one on the Hot 100 and Billboard 200 simultaneously. They also became the first group and ninth overall act to prevail on top of the Artist 100, Hot 100, and Billboard 200 charts at the same time. Seven tracks from the album charted concurrently on the Hot 100 chart, with "Life Goes On" and "Dynamite" in the top-10, "Blue & Grey" in the top-20, and "Stay" in the top-40. This stood as the most simultaneous entries on the Hot 100 chart by a Korean act. With over 252,000 physical copies sold by the end of 2020, according to MRC Data, Be was the fifth best-selling physical album of the year in the US. It was one of two BTS albums to make it on the top-ten ranking, the other being Map of the Soul: 7 in first place, making BTS the only artist with multiple albums on the chart. In Canada, Be arrived at number one on the Canadian Albums Chart, giving BTS their fourth chart-topping album in the country.

Be debuted at number one on South Korea's Gaon Album Chart with over 2.2 million copies sold in its first week. This marked the second-highest opening week sales figures in the chart's history, only behind Map of the Soul: 7 which holds the record with over 3.3 million copies its first week. Be became BTS's eighth consecutive million seller in the country. The album exceeded sales of 2,692,000 copies by the end of 2020, achieving the second position on Gaon's year-end chart, only behind Map of the Soul: 7. BTS had the most entries on the 100-spot ranking, with 13 of their albums entering the final chart. In March 2021, the album received a triple million certification from the Korea Music Content Association (KMCA). In Japan, Be reached number one on the Oricon Albums Chart and was certified platinum by the Recording Industry Association of Japan (RIAJ).

Be debuted at number two on the UK Albums Chart with first-week sales of 19,562 copies, behind Michael Ball and Alfie Boe's Together at Christmas. This became BTS's fourth top-10 album in the country. In Ireland, the album topped the Irish Albums Chart, becoming the band's second chart-topper following Map of the Soul: 7. By doing so, BTS became the first group in eight years to have two number-one albums in the same calendar year since One Direction in 2012, and also the first act since Ed Sheeran in 2017. The album was also a chart-topper in New Zealand, giving BTS their third number one album in the territory. By reaching the same position on both the Norwegian Albums Chart and Ultratop 200 Albums chart, Be became BTS's first number one album in Norway and in the Flemish region of Belgium. It also topped the charts in Denmark, Poland, and Portugal. In Australia, Be entered at number two on the ARIA Albums chart, giving BTS their seventh top-10 entry. The album also attained number two position in Finland, France, Italy, Netherlands, Spain, and Switzerland. Similarly, Be reached number three in Sweden and Wallonia region of Belgium. The album also entered Germany's Offizielle Top 100 at number four, and the Czech Albums at number five.

Following the release of the Essential Edition in February 2021, Be returned to the top 10 of the US Billboard 200 at number seven on the chart dated March 6, with an additional 36,000 equivalent album units sold. Of this number, 28,000 copies were pure sales, giving the album a third non-consecutive week at number one on the Top Album Sales chart. BTS also returned to the top of the Artist 100 chart for their 16th week overall, further extending their record among all duos/groups. In Japan, the album sold an additional 95,853 copies for the period February 15–21 and re-entered the top three of the weekly Oricon Albums Chart at number two on the issue dated March 1, 2021. The album also ranked at number two on the monthly chart for February, with 118,912 cumulative sales. On March 26, Billboard reported that 32 albums saw an increase in sales—for the week ending March 18—following the 63rd Annual Grammy Awards. Of these, Be was the 12th highest-selling album—experiencing a 6% increase—and moved 15,300 units, which helped push it into the top 40 of the Billboard 200 at number 39. As of August 2021, the album has remained on the chart for 37 consecutive weeks.

== Track listing ==
Be track listing
No.	Title	Writer(s)	Producer(s)	Length
1.	"Life Goes On"	Antonina Armato; Chris James; J-Hope; Pdogg; RM; Ruuth; Suga	Pdogg	3:27
2.	"Fly to My Room" (내 방을 여행하는 법; Nae bang-eul yeohaenghaneun beob [lit. "How to travel in my room"], performed by Suga, V, J-Hope, and Jimin)	Cosmo's Midnight; J-Hope; Joe Femi Griffith; RM; Suga	Cosmo's Midnight	3:42
3.	"Blue & Grey"	Hiss Noise; J-Hope; Park Ji-soo; Levi; Metaphor; RM; Suga; V	Hiss Noise; Park Ji-soo; Levi; V	4:15
4.	"Skit"	J-Hope; Jimin; Jin; Jungkook; RM; Suga; V	J-Hope; Jimin; Jin; Jungkook; RM; Suga; V	3:00
5.	"Telepathy" (잠시; Jamsi [lit. "For a moment"])	El Capitxn; Hiss Noise; Jung Kook; RM; Suga	El Capitxn; Hiss Noise	3:22
6.	"Dis-ease" (병; Byeong [lit. "Illness"])	Ghstloop; Ivan Jackson Rosenberg; J-Hope; Jimin; Pdogg; RM; Randy Runyon; Suga	Brasstracks	4:00
7.	"Stay" (performed by RM, Jin, and Jungkook)	Arston; Jin; Jung Kook; RM	Arston	3:25
8.	"Dynamite"	David Stewart; Jessica Agombar	Stewart	3:19
Total length:				28:30

== Personnel ==
Credits adapted from liner notes, Big Hit's website, NetEase Music and Tidal.

Main Musicians

- BTS – primary vocals
  - Jin – songwriting (track 4, 7), production (track 4), vocals (tracks 1, 3–8)
  - Suga – songwriting (tracks 1–6), production (track 4), rap arrangement (track 2–3, 5–6), recording engineer (track 2–3, 5–6), vocals (tracks 1–6, 8)
  - J-Hope – songwriting (tracks 1–4, 6), production (track 4), rap arrangement (track 2–3, 5–6), recording engineer (track 2–3, 5–6), vocals (tracks 1–6, 8)
  - RM – songwriting (tracks 1–7), production (track 4), rap arrangement (track 1, 3, 5–7), recording engineer (track 1, 3, 5–7), vocals (tracks 1, 3–8), background vocals (track 7)
  - Jimin – songwriting (tracks 4, 6), production (track 4), vocals (tracks 1–6, 8), background vocals (track 2)
  - V – songwriting (tracks 3, 4), production (tracks 3, 4), vocals (tracks 1–6, 8), background vocals (track 2)
  - Jungkook – songwriting (tracks 4–5, 7), production (track 4), vocals (tracks 1, 3–8), background vocals (track 1, 5, 7)

- David Stewart – songwriting, production (track 8), drums (track 8), percussion (track 8), bass guitar (track 8), synth bass (track 8), synthesizer (track 8), pads (track 8), piano (track 8), electric guitars (track 8), programmed horns (track 8), programmed strings (track 8), background vocals (track 8)
- Pdogg – songwriting (tracks 1, 6), production (track 1), additional production (track 6), keyboard (track 1, 6), synthesizer (track 1, 6), programming (track 6), vocal arrangement (track 1–3, 5–7), rap arrangement (track 1), recording engineer (track 1–3, 5–8), digital editing (track 1)
- Ghstloop – production (track 5), digital editing (track 2, 6), gang vocals (track 5), keyboard (track 6), synthesizer (track 6), programming (track 6), additional drums (track 6)
- Hiss Noise – songwriting, production (track 3, 5), drums (track 3), digital editing (track 3, 5, 7), synthesizer (track 5), gang vocals(track 5), recording engineer (track 5)
- Jisoo Park – songwriting, production (track 3), guitar (track 3), piano (track 3), string/clarinet (track 3), drums (track 3)
- Ivan Jackson Rosenberg – songwriting (track 6), keyboard (track 6), guitar (track 6), bass (track 6), programming (track 6)
- El Capitxn – songwriting, production (track 5), keyboard (track 5), gang vocals (track 5)
- Randy Runyon – songwriting (track 6), guitar (track 6)
- Cosmo's Midnight – songwriting, production (track 2)
- Arston – songwriting, production (track 7)
- Levi – songwriting, production (track 3)
- Metaphor – songwriting, production (track 3)
- Ruuth – songwriting (track 1), background vocals (track 1)
- Antonina Armato – songwriting (track 1)
- Chris James – songwriting (track 1)
- Jessica Agombar – songwriting (track 8)
- Joe Femi Griffith – songwriting (track 2)
- Brasstracks – production (track 6)

Instrument

- Patrick Liney – keyboard (track 2)
- Cosmo Liney – bass (track 2)
- Young – guitar (track 5)
- nobody – bass (track 5)
- Conor Rayne – additional drums (track 6)
- DJ Friz – scratch (track 6)
- Arston – percussion (track 7)
- Johnny Thurkell – live horns (track 8)

Technical

- Erik Reichers – recording engineer (track 2)
- Lee Yeon-su – recording engineer (track 2)
- Son Yu-jeong – recording engineer (track 5)
- Summergal – digital editing (track 2, 6–7), gang vocals (track 5)
- Revin – digital editing (track 5)
- Josh Gudwin – mix engineer (track 1)
- Bob Horn – mix engineer (track 2)
- Yang Ga – mix engineer (track 3, 5)
- Ken Lewis – mix engineer (track 6)
- James F. Reynolds – mix engineer (track 7)
- Serban Ghenea – mix engineer (track 8)
- Elijah Merritt – assistant mixer (track 1)
- Heidi Wang – assistant mixer (track 1)
- Dominik Rivinus – assistant mixer (track 6)
- John Hanes – assistant mixer (track 8)
- Jenna Andrews – vocal production (track 8)
- Juan "Saucy" Peña – vocal engineer (track 8)
- Duane Benjamin – vocal orchestrator (track 2)

Extra Vocals

- The Singingforbonez Singers (Kenna Ramsey, Meloney Collins, Dedrick Bonner, Loren Smith) – choir (track 2)
- James Keys – background vocals (track 2)
- Joe Femi Griffith – background vocals(track 2)
- Adora – background vocals (track 5)
- Frants – gang vocals (track 5)
- Slow Rabbit – gang vocals (track 5)
- Jung Woo-yeong – gang vocals (track 5)
- Matt Thomson (Arcades) – gang vocals (track 7)
- Max Lynedoch Graham (Arcades) – gang vocals (track 7)
- Marie Ortinau – gang vocals (track 7)
- Jogn McEwan – gang vocals (track 7)

== Charts ==
=== Weekly charts ===
Weekly chart performance
Chart (2020–2026)	Peak position
Australian Albums (ARIA)	2
Austrian Albums (Ö3 Austria)	4
Belgian Albums (Ultratop Flanders)	3
Belgian Albums (Ultratop Wallonia)	1
Canadian Albums (Billboard)	1
Croatian International Albums (HDU)	6
Czech Albums (ČNS IFPI)	5
Danish Albums (Hitlisten)	1
Dutch Albums (Album Top 100)	2
Finnish Albums (Suomen virallinen lista)	2
French Albums (SNEP)	2
German Albums (Offizielle Top 100)	4
Greek Albums (IFPI)	34
Hungarian Albums (MAHASZ)	4
Icelandic Albums (Tónlistinn)	14
Irish Albums (Official Charts)	1
Italian Albums (FIMI)	2
Japanese Albums (Oricon)	1
Japan Hot Albums (Billboard Japan)	1
Lithuanian Albums (AGATA)	1
New Zealand Albums (RMNZ)	1
Norwegian Albums (VG-lista)	1
Polish Albums (ZPAV)	1
Portuguese Albums (AFP)	1
Scottish Albums (Official Charts)	5
Slovak Albums (ČNS IFPI)	5
South Korean Albums (Gaon)	1
Spanish Albums (PROMUSICAE)	2
Swedish Albums (Sverigetopplistan)	3
Swiss Albums (Schweizer Hitparade)	2
UK Albums (Official Charts)	2
US Billboard 200	1
US World Albums (Billboard)	1

=== Monthly charts ===
Monthly chart performance
Chart (2020)	Peak position
Japanese Albums (Oricon)	3
South Korean Albums (Gaon)	1

=== Year-end charts ===
Year-end chart performance
Chart (2020)	Position
Belgian Albums (Ultratop Wallonia)	127
French Albums (SNEP)	142
Hungarian Albums (MAHASZ)	56
Italian Albums (FIMI)	96
Japanese Albums (Oricon)	16
Polish Albums (ZPAV)	43
Portuguese Albums (AFP)	4
South Korean Albums (Gaon)	2
Spanish Albums (PROMUSICAE)	53
Swiss Albums (Schweizer Hitparade)	76
Chart (2021)	Position
Belgian Albums (Ultratop Flanders)	90
Belgian Albums (Ultratop Wallonia)	134
French Albums (SNEP)	124
German Albums (Offizielle Top 100)	72
Hungarian Albums (MAHASZ)	56
Japan Hot Albums (Billboard Japan)	7
Japanese Albums (Oricon)	11
South Korean Albums (Gaon)	10
Swiss Albums (Schweizer Hitparade)	61
US Billboard 200	40

== Certifications and sales ==
Sales certifications for Be
Region	Certification	Certified units/sales
Canada (Music Canada)	Platinum	80,000^{‡}
Denmark (IFPI Danmark)	Gold	10,000^{‡}
France (SNEP)	Gold	50,000^{‡}
Italy (FIMI)	Gold	25,000^{‡}
Japan (RIAJ)	Platinum	250,000^{^}
New Zealand (RMNZ)	Gold	7,500^{‡}
Poland (ZPAV)	Gold	10,000^{‡}
South Korea (KMCA)	3× Million	3,000,000^{^}
United Kingdom (BPI)	Silver	60,000^{‡}
United States (RIAA)	Platinum	1,000,000^{‡}
Summaries
Worldwide (IFPI)	—	2,690,000
^{^} Shipments figures based on certification alone.^{‡} Sales+streaming figures based on certification alone.

== Release history ==
Release formats for Be
Region	Date	Format	Label	Edition	Ref.
Various	November 20, 2020	Digital download; streaming	Big Hit Entertainment	Deluxe	
Various	November 20, 2020	CD	Big Hit Entertainment	Deluxe	
Various	February 19, 2021	CD	Big Hit Entertainment	Essential	

== See also ==
- List of 2020 albums
- List of Billboard 200 number-one albums of 2020
- List of number-one albums of 2020 (Belgium)
- List of number-one albums of 2020 (Canada)
- List of number-one albums of 2020 (Ireland)
- List of number-one albums from the 2020s (New Zealand)
- List of number-one albums in Norway
- List of number-one albums of 2020 (Poland)
