= Cruel Summer (Taylor Swift song) =

2023 single by Taylor Swift

Single by Taylor Swift

from the album Lover
- Released: June 20, 2023
- Studio: Electric Lady (New York City); Conway Recording (Los Angeles)
- Genre: Electropop; synth-pop; bubblegum pop; industrial pop
- Length: 2:58
- Label: Republic
- Songwriters: Taylor Swift; Jack Antonoff; Annie Clark
- Producers: Taylor Swift; Jack Antonoff

Taylor Swift singles chronology
"Karma" (2023)	"Cruel Summer" (2023)	"'Slut!'" (2023)

Audio video
- "Cruel Summer" on YouTube

"Cruel Summer" is a song by the American singer-songwriter Taylor Swift from her seventh studio album, Lover (2019). Swift and Jack Antonoff produced the song, and they wrote it with St. Vincent. "Cruel Summer" is an electropop, synth-pop, bubblegum pop, and industrial pop song composed of synths, wobbling beats, and vocoder-manipulated vocals. The lyrics are about an intense and painful summer romance.

Initial reviews of Lover lauded "Cruel Summer" for its melodic composition and catchy sound, specifically highlighting the hook and bridge; many deemed it a highlight on the album. Retrospective reviews have considered "Cruel Summer" one of Swift's best songs, and it was placed on the 2024 revision of Rolling Stone's 500 Greatest Songs of All Time. "Cruel Summer" debuted in the top 30 of various singles charts in 2019 and became a fan favorite over time, prompting fans and publications to question why Swift did not release the track as a single.

After being included in the set list of Swift's sixth concert tour, the Eras Tour, in 2023, "Cruel Summer" became viral on social media, leading Republic Records to release it as a single on June 20, 2023. In the United States, the single peaked atop the Billboard Hot 100 for four weeks and helped Swift become the solo artist with the most number-one songs on the Pop Airplay and Adult Pop Airplay radio charts. It also topped the Billboard Global 200 and the singles charts in Australia, Canada, the Philippines, and Singapore. The song has been certified diamond in France, and multi-platinum in Australia, Brazil, New Zealand, Poland, Portugal, Spain, Switzerland, and the United Kingdom.

== Background and composition ==
Taylor Swift described her seventh studio album, Lover, as a "love letter to love" itself with all the feelings evoked by it. The album was released on August 23, 2019, via Republic Records. Lover consists of 18 tracks, and "Cruel Summer" is track number two. According to Swift, the track is about an uncertain summer romance with elements of pain and desperation in it. The relationship in question is "where you're yearning for something that you don't quite have yet, it's just right there, and you just can't reach it".

"Cruel Summer"
A sample of the refrain, instrumented by pulsing synths and fluctuating vocals singing "ooooh"

"Cruel Summer" is an electropop, synth-pop, bubblegum pop, and industrial pop song. Critics described its production as melancholic or dreamy. It has a "ranting" bridge underscored by skittering synths, distorted vocals manipulated by a vocoder, and a hook that consists of a long, high, fluctuating "ooooh". The song has a fast tempo of 170 beats per minute with a time signature of 4/4. It is played in the key of A major and follows a chord progression of A–C♯m–F♯m–D. Swift's vocals range from A_{2} to E_{5}. "Cruel Summer" was written by Swift, Jack Antonoff and St. Vincent, with a "burbling" production from Swift and Antonoff; St. Vincent also took part in the production of the song, playing the guitar.

Lyrically, the song is about a summer romance that entails strong feelings, including romantic ecstasy, anxiety, and pain. David Penn of Hit Songs Deconstructed opined that the song's vocals, instrumentation and lyrics work "in tandem to create a unified expression, a combination known as prosody". According to Time's Raina Bruner, the song also portrays the challenges faced by pop stars in the public spotlight, similar to the theme of Swift's 2017 song "Delicate". Justin Styles of The Ringer wrote that the song tells a "more humanizing version" of Swift's "ill-fated period three years ago", adding that Swift sings about "falling in love with then-current boyfriend Joe Alwyn while her public life was in shambles". Anna Gaca, writing for Pitchfork, called the song a "drama-free delight" with "magnetic pink glow". The Spinoff pointed out that Swift's vocals in "Cruel Summer" are "most notable for the modern country cadence".

== Release and commercial performance ==
"Cruel Summer" was released as the second track on Lover, on August 23, 2019, via Republic Records. The track originally charted as an album cut within the top 30 in Singapore (8), Malaysia (13), Ireland (20), New Zealand (20), Australia (23), the United Kingdom (27), and Canada (28). In the United States, the song debuted at number 29 on the Billboard Hot 100 dated September 7, 2019; it is one of the seven tracks from Lover to reach the top 40 and remained on the chart for two weeks. The song became a widespread fan favorite over time and critics and fans questioned Swift's decision over not having released "Cruel Summer" as a single.

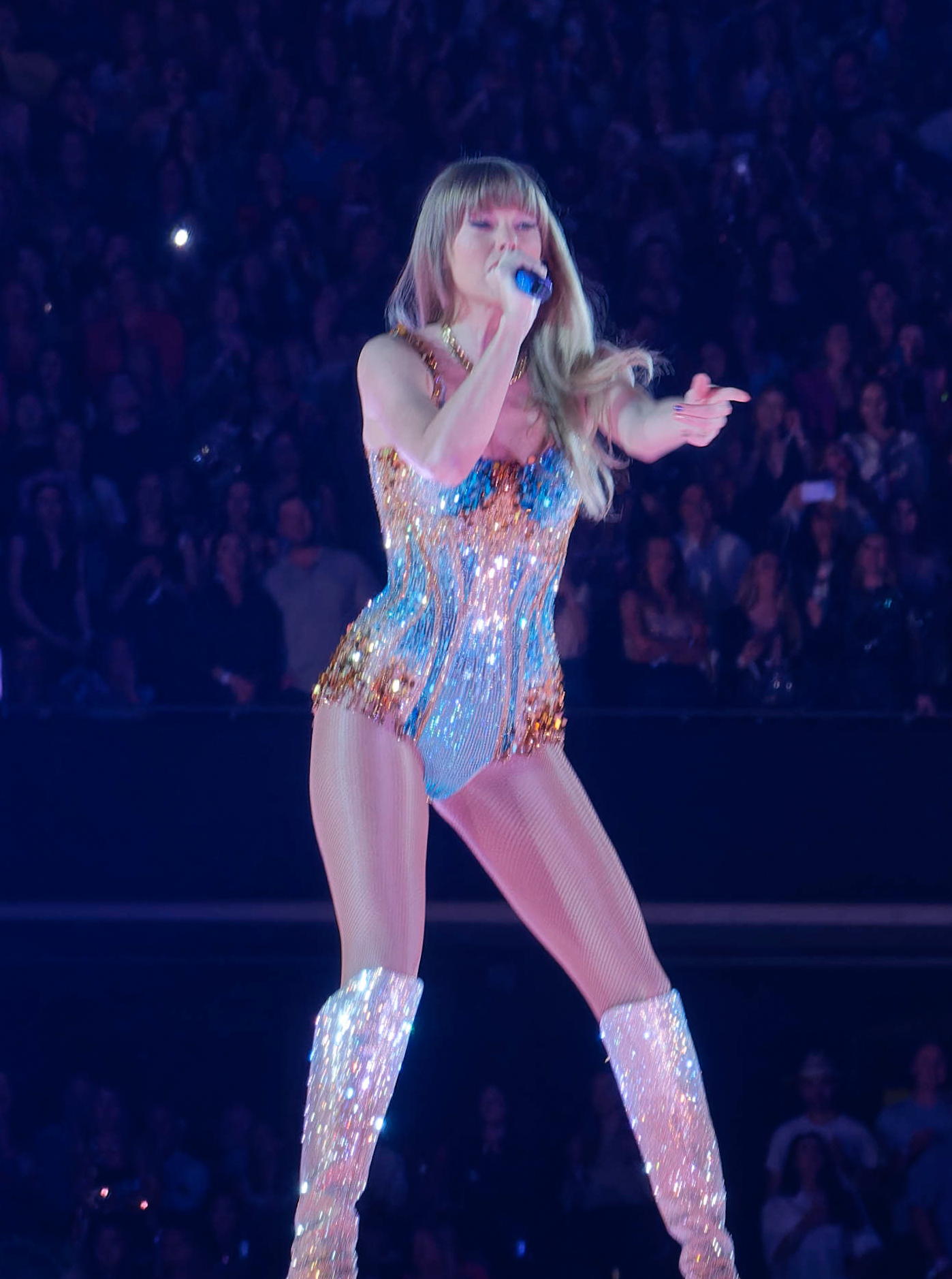
"Cruel Summer" resurged in popularity after Swift included it in the setlist of the Eras Tour in 2023.

Beginning March 2023, Swift embarked on the Eras Tour, her sixth headlining concert tour, as a tribute to all of her "musical eras". The show begins with the Lover act, during which "Cruel Summer" is the second song performed. Around this time, the song began to resurge in popularity and streaming after it became viral on social media. In the U.S., the single re-entered the Billboard Hot 100 at number 49 on the chart dated June 3, 2023. It began gaining airplay spins on US radio by mid-June, leading Republic Records to release it as a single to US contemporary hit radio on June 20, 2023. The song also impacted hot adult contemporary radio on June 26. On June 17, at an Eras Tour show in Pittsburgh, Swift said she had intended to release "Cruel Summer" as a single in 2020 during the promotional cycle for Lover but she abandoned the plan after the outbreak of the COVID-19 pandemic, instead shifting her artistic direction and releasing her next album, Folklore.

"Cruel Summer" became Swift's record-extending 41st song to reach the top 10 on the Billboard Hot 100 and the fourth Lover track to do so. After the release of the Eras Tour's accompanying concert film, a live recording of the song and a remix by LP Giobbi were released as part of a streaming compilation, titled The Cruelest Summer, on October 18, 2023. "Cruel Summer" topped the Billboard Hot 100, marking Lover's first and Swift's 10th number-one single. It was replaced by, and in turn replaced, Swift's "Is It Over Now?" atop the Hot 100 for one week, spending a total of four non-consecutive weeks at number one and making Swift the first female artist to succeed herself at the top spot twice and thrice.

On US Billboard airplay charts in 2023, "Cruel Summer" became Swift's eighth number-one single on Radio Songs, where it reigned for 12 non-consecutive weeks surpassing "Blank Space" as her longest running number one. It became her 12th number-one single on Pop Airplay, and her 11th number-one single on Adult Pop Airplay, making her the solo artist with the most chart toppers on the latter two charts. The song also spent 10 weeks atop Pop Airplay and 23 weeks atop Adult Pop Airplay, becoming her longest-running number-one song on both and the longest-running number-one song by a solo artist and female artist on the latter. Jason Lipshutz of Billboard commented that the single's resurgent success "simply demonstrates Swift's current ubiquity, unprecedented in the modern music era". In January 2024, the song topped the Adult Contemporary chart, marking Swift's ninth number-one single. As such, it made Swift the first artist in history to release six singles that topped the Adult Contemporary, Adult Pop Airplay and Pop Airplay charts individually, surpassing Adele (five). Additionally, the song spent 34 weeks in the top ten of the Hot 100, becoming the first song by a solo female artist to do so. In total, "Cruel Summer" spent 54 weeks on the Hot 100, becoming Swift's longest-charting Hot 100 hit, surpassing "Anti-Hero".

Elsewhere, "Cruel Summer" reached new peaks in Australia (1), Canada (1), Singapore (1), New Zealand (3), Ireland (4), Malaysia (6), and Brazil (54) as well. It peaked at number one in the Philippines and entered the top 10 in Indonesia, as well in few Europeans countries, including Switzerland and Iceland, top twenty for most of them, including Norway, Sweden, Austria, Portugal, the Netherlands and Luxembourg and top forty in Denmark and Slovakia. In France, from the general surprise, due to massive broadcasting radio plays, the song didn't reached the top fifty and reached number 52. However, the song spent 55 weeks and peaked at number 9 on French airplay and was certified diamond, becoming Swift fifth diamond single at the time. The song was certified thirteen-times platinum in Australia; seven-times platinum in New Zealand; quadruple platinum in Portugal and the United Kingdom; triple platinum in Switzerland; and double platinum in Brazil, Poland, and Spain. It reached number one on the Billboard Global 200, and was the sixth-most-streamed song globally on Spotify in 2023. The song was the seventh-biggest song of 2023 according to the International Federation of the Phonographic Industry (IFPI), with an equivalent of 1.39 billion global subscription streams. Within the first half of 2024, according to Luminate Data, the single was the third-most-streamed song globally with 1.012 billion streams. St. Vincent described the resurgent success of "Cruel Summer" as "crazy", "so wild and so modern".

== Critical reception ==
In reviews of Lover, "Cruel Summer" received rave reviews from music critics, particularly for its production, bridge and hook. Jon Caramanica of The New York Times commended the "thick, ethereal" production and Swift's signature vocal motifs such as the "question-mark syllables" and the "hard-felt smears". Mikael Wood of the Los Angeles Times proclaimed "Cruel Summer" to be the best song of Lover and said the bridge where Swift "shrieks about the devil might be the punkest thing you'll hear all year". Alex Abad-Santos, writing for Vox, listed "Cruel Summer" as one of his top-three best Lover tracks, writing that the song is an "aquatic robot bop" featuring "wobbly" synths. The Spinoff stated that Swift "absolutely pulls it off" and compared it to Bananarama's 1983 song of the same name. Writing for The Ringer, Justin Sayles praised the song as a "better rebuke of her personal drama than anything on her last album", and added that Swift "shakes off the bad vibes" with "Cruel Summer"; Sayles named it Swift's "most infectious song since that run of singles from 1989", and opined that song "sets the tone" for the "warmer, more inviting vibes" of Lover. Also calling it "infectious", Nick Levine of NME termed the track as a "brilliant pop song". Natalia Barr, writing for Consequence, highlighted Swift's vocal delivery in the song's bridge ("He looks up, grinning like a devil"), calling it "simultaneously funny, agonizing, and thrilling, and needs to be created into a viral YouTube loop immediately". Barr further labeled "Cruel Summer" as one of the "most perfect" pop songs of 2019. "Cruel Summer" featured on year-end lists of the best songs of 2019 by Rolling Stone (4th) and Billboard (10th).

Retrospectively, "Cruel Summer" continued to receive high acclaim, and has been deemed the signature track of Lover. In a 2021 list ranking the best bridges of the 21st-century, Billboard placed "Cruel Summer" at number 11. The song has ranked highly on critics' rankings of Swift's songs in her discography, appearing on such lists by Rob Sheffield of Rolling Stone (2021) at number 11 out of 229, and Hannah Mylrea of NME (2020), number 6 out of 161. Clash critics picked the song as one of Swift's 15 best, citing its "highly addictive" song structure. In 2022, Exclaim!'s Alex Hudson and Megan LaPierre ranked it second on another list of the best 20 songs by Swift, praising how St. Vincent's artistic input complements Swift's. Allaire Nuss of Entertainment Weekly described it as a "buzzer-beating, angst-wielding anthem". Brittany Spanos of Rolling Stone wrote in 2023, "Swift flaunts a rock-star edge alongside a grand sense of romantic urgency" in "Cruel Summer", making it one of her best songs. Billboard opined in 2023 that "Cruel Summer" is both a fan and a critics' favorite. In 2024, Rolling Stone ranked the song at number 400 in their updated list of the 500 Greatest Songs of All Time.

== Accolades ==
Awards and nominations
Award	Year	Category	Result	Ref.
iHeartRadio Music Awards	2024	Song of the Year	Nominated	
iHeartRadio Music Awards	2024	Pop Song of the Year	Nominated	
iHeartRadio Music Awards	2024	TikTok Bop of the Year	Won	
BMI Pop Awards	2024	Most Performed Songs of the Year	Won	
Billboard Music Awards	2024	Top Billboard Global 200 Song	Nominated	
Billboard Music Awards	2024	Top Billboard Global (Excl. U.S.) Song	Nominated	
Billboard Music Awards	2024	Top Radio Song	Nominated	
New Music Awards	2024	Top 40/CHR Song of the Year	Won	

== Usage in media ==
- American singer-songwriter Olivia Rodrigo performed the song for MTV's Alone Together Jam Session in 2020, which Swift subsequently praised. Rodrigo later stated that "Cruel Summer" partially inspired her 2021 single "Deja Vu", eventually crediting Swift, Antonoff, and St. Vincent as co-writers; it peaked at number three on the U.S. Hot 100.
- It was featured in the first season of Amazon Prime Video series The Summer I Turned Pretty in June 2022.
- It was covered by the rock band the Maine in July 2023.
- It was one of Swift's songs used in a November 2023 episode of the American dance competition television show Dancing with the Stars, which was a tribute episode in honor of Swift; American television personality Ariana Madix and dance choreographer Pasha Pashkov performed a rumba to a rendition of the song.
- Australian singer G Flip covered the song for Triple J's Like a Version in January 2024. The performance received widespread acclaim, and Swift showed her appreciation by liking Triple J's Instagram post about the cover. She also reached out to G Flip privately, expressing her admiration for the cover.
- American singer-songwriter Teddy Swims covered the song for BBC Radio 1's Live Lounge segment in January 2024.

== Personnel ==
Credits adapted from the liner notes of Lover

- Taylor Swift – vocals, songwriter, producer
- Jack Antonoff – producer, songwriter, programmer, recording engineer, drums, keyboards, vocoder
- St. Vincent – songwriter, guitar
- Michael Riddleberger – drums
- Serban Ghenea – mixer
- John Hanes – mix engineer
- John Rooney – assistant recording engineer
- Laura Sisk – recording engineer
- Jon Sher – assistant recording engineer

== Charts ==
=== Weekly charts ===
2019 weekly chart performance
Chart (2019)	Peak position
Australia (ARIA)	22
Canada (Canadian Hot 100)	28
Czech Republic Singles Digital (ČNS IFPI)	84
Greece International (IFPI)	57
Ireland (IRMA)	20
Malaysia (RIM)	13
New Zealand (Recorded Music NZ)	20
Portugal (AFP)	94
Scottish Singles Sales (Official Charts)	70
Singapore (RIAS)	8
Slovakia Singles Digital (ČNS IFPI)	100
Sweden Heatseeker (Sverigetopplistan)	10
UK Singles (Official Charts)	27
US Billboard Hot 100	29

2023–2024 weekly chart performance
Chart (2023–2024)	Peak position
Argentina Hot 100 (Billboard)	64
Australia (ARIA)	1
Austria (Ö3 Austria Top 40)	16
Belgium (Ultratop 50 Flanders)	46
Brazil Hot 100 (Billboard)	54
Canada Hot 100 (Billboard)	1
Canada AC (Billboard)	1
Canada CHR/Top 40 (Billboard)	1
Canada Hot AC (Billboard)	1
Colombia Anglo Airplay (National-Report)	2
CIS Airplay (TopHit)	38
Croatia International Airplay (Top lista)	7
Czech Republic Airplay (ČNS IFPI)	4
Czech Republic Singles Digital (ČNS IFPI)	43
Denmark (Tracklisten)	31
Estonia Airplay (TopHit)	2
Finland Airplay (Radiosoittolista)	14
France (SNEP)	52
France Airplay (SNEP)	9
Germany (GfK)	15
Global 200 (Billboard)	1
Greece International (IFPI)	11
Hong Kong (Billboard)	11
Iceland (Tónlistinn)	6
India International (IMI)	7
Indonesia (Billboard)	3
Ireland (IRMA)	4
Israel International Airplay (Media Forest)	6
Italy (FIMI)	85
Japan Hot 100 (Billboard)	48
Japan Combined Singles (Oricon)	44
Latvia Airplay (LaIPA)	1
Latvia Streaming (LaIPA)	9
Lithuania (AGATA)	30
Lithuania Airplay (TopHit)	3
Luxembourg (Billboard)	17
Malaysia (Billboard)	3
Malaysia International (RIM)	2
Middle East and North Africa (IFPI)	19
Netherlands (Dutch Top 40)	7
Netherlands (Global Top 40)	4
Netherlands (Single Top 100)	11
New Zealand (Recorded Music NZ)	3
Nigeria (TurnTable Top 100)	59
Norway (VG-lista)	18
Panama International (PRODUCE)	10
Panama Airplay (Monitor Latino)	10
Paraguay Airplay (Monitor Latino)	14
Philippines (Billboard)	1
Poland (Polish Airplay Top 100)	8
Poland (Polish Streaming Top 100)	58
Portugal (AFP)	17
Russia Airplay (TopHit)	181
Singapore (RIAS)	1
Slovakia Airplay (ČNS IFPI)	4
Slovakia Singles Digital (ČNS IFPI)	38
South Africa Airplay (TOSAC)	2
South Korea (Circle)	72
Spain (Promusicae)	63
Spain Airplay (Promusicae)	2
Sweden (Sverigetopplistan)	13
Switzerland (Schweizer Hitparade)	9
Switzerland Airplay (Schweizer Hitparade)	6
Taiwan (Billboard)	11
United Arab Emirates (IFPI)	3
UK Singles (Official Charts)	2
US Billboard Hot 100	1
US Adult Contemporary (Billboard)	1
US Adult Pop Airplay (Billboard)	1
US Dance Airplay (Billboard)	12
US Pop Airplay (Billboard)	1
Venezuela Airplay (Record Report)	41
Vietnam Hot 100 (Billboard)	12

2025 weekly chart performance
Chart (2025)	Peak position
Estonia Airplay (TopHit)	95

2026 weekly chart performance
Chart (2026)	Peak position
Colombia Anglo Airplay (National-Report)	5
Venezuela Airplay (Record Report)	78

=== Monthly charts ===
Monthly chart performance
Chart (2023–2024)	Peak position
CIS Airplay (TopHit)	42
Paraguay Airplay (SGP)	58
South Korea (Circle)	72

=== Year-end charts ===
2023 year-end chart performance
Chart (2023)	Position
Australia (ARIA)	8
Austria (Ö3 Austria Top 40)	51
Canada (Canadian Hot 100)	13
CIS Airplay (TopHit)	169
Germany (GfK)	69
Global 200 (Billboard)	27
Global Singles (IFPI)	7
Iceland (Tónlistinn)	41
Netherlands (Dutch Top 40)	47
Netherlands (Single Top 100)	77
New Zealand (Recorded Music NZ)	19
Philippines (Philippines Hot 100)	8
Poland (Polish Airplay Top 100)	69
Sweden (Sverigetopplistan)	85
Switzerland (Schweizer Hitparade)	65
UK Singles (OCC)	11
US Billboard Hot 100	18
US Adult Contemporary (Billboard)	13
US Adult Pop Airplay (Billboard)	14
US Pop Airplay (Billboard)	11

2024 year-end chart performance
Chart (2024)	Position
Australia (ARIA)	9
Austria (Ö3 Austria Top 40)	63
Canada (Canadian Hot 100)	14
CIS Airplay (TopHit)	134
Denmark (Tracklisten)	100
Estonia Airplay (TopHit)	57
France (SNEP)	95
Germany (GfK)	52
Global 200 (Billboard)	4
Global Singles (IFPI)	9
Iceland (Tónlistinn)	41
Netherlands (Dutch Top 40)	79
Netherlands (Single Top 100)	85
New Zealand (Recorded Music NZ)	16
Philippines (Philippines Hot 100)	16
South Korea (Circle)	109
Sweden (Sverigetopplistan)	73
Switzerland (Schweizer Hitparade)	35
UK Singles (OCC)	11
US Billboard Hot 100	12
US Adult Contemporary (Billboard)	2
US Adult Pop Airplay (Billboard)	3
US Pop Airplay (Billboard)	10
Venezuela Anglo (Record Report)	15

2025 year-end chart performance
Chart (2025)	Position
Australia (ARIA)	97
Canada AC (Billboard)	63
Global 200 (Billboard)	47
Estonia Airplay (TopHit)	142
South Korea (Circle)	140
US Adult Contemporary (Billboard)	12

== Certifications ==
Certifications
Region	Certification	Certified units/sales
Australia (ARIA)	13× Platinum	910,000^{‡}
Austria (IFPI Austria)	Platinum	30,000^{‡}
Brazil (Pro-Música Brasil)	2× Platinum	80,000^{‡}
Denmark (IFPI Danmark)	Platinum	90,000^{‡}
France (SNEP)	Diamond	333,333^{‡}
Germany (BVMI)	Platinum	600,000^{‡}
Italy (FIMI)	Platinum	100,000^{‡}
New Zealand (RMNZ)	7× Platinum	210,000^{‡}
Poland (ZPAV)	2× Platinum	100,000^{‡}
Portugal (AFP)	4× Platinum	40,000^{‡}
Spain (Promusicae)	2× Platinum	120,000^{‡}
Switzerland (IFPI Switzerland)	3× Platinum	60,000^{‡}
United Kingdom (BPI)	4× Platinum	2,400,000^{‡}
Streaming
Greece (IFPI Greece)	Platinum	2,000,000^{†}
Japan (RIAJ)	Platinum	100,000,000^{†}
Sweden (GLF)	Platinum	12,000,000^{†}
^{‡} Sales+streaming figures based on certification alone.^{†} Streaming-only figures based on certification alone.

== Release history ==
Release dates and formats
Region	Date	Format(s)	Version	Label(s)	Ref.
United States	June 20, 2023	Contemporary hit radio	Original	Republic	
United States	June 26, 2023	Hot adult contemporary radio	Original	Republic	
Italy	September 15, 2023	Radio airplay	Original	Island	
Various	October 18, 2023	Digital download; streaming	Live; LP Giobbi remix	Republic	

== See also ==
- List of Billboard Hot 100 number ones of 2023
- List of Radio Songs number ones of the 2020s
- List of Billboard Pop Airplay number-one songs of 2023
- List of Billboard Adult Top 40 number-one songs of the 2020s
- List of Canadian Hot 100 number-one singles of 2023
- List of highest-certified singles in Australia
- List of number-one songs of 2023 (Singapore)
- List of number-one songs of 2024 (Singapore)
- List of number-one singles of 2024 (Australia)
