= List of number-one albums of 2023 (Canada) =

These are the Canadian number-one albums of 2023. The chart is compiled by Luminate and published in Billboard magazine as Top Canadian Albums.

== Number-one albums ==
Key
| † | Indicates best-performing album of 2023 |

List of number-one albums
| Issue date | Album | Artist(s) | Ref. |
|---|---|---|---|
| January 7 | Christmas | Michael Bublé | |
| January 14 | SOS | SZA | |
| January 21 | SOS | SZA | |
| January 28 | SOS | SZA | |
| February 4 | SOS | SZA | |
| February 11 | SOS | SZA | |
| February 18 | SOS | SZA | |
| February 25 | SOS | SZA | |
| March 4 | Trustfall | Pink | |
| March 11 | SOS | SZA | |
| March 18 | One Thing at a Time † | Morgan Wallen | |
| March 25 | One Thing at a Time † | Morgan Wallen | |
| April 1 | One Thing at a Time † | Morgan Wallen | |
| April 8 | One Thing at a Time † | Morgan Wallen | |
| April 15 | One Thing at a Time † | Morgan Wallen | |
| April 22 | One Thing at a Time † | Morgan Wallen | |
| April 29 | 72 Seasons | Metallica | |
| May 6 | One Thing at a Time † | Morgan Wallen | |
| May 13 | One Thing at a Time † | Morgan Wallen | |
| May 20 | One Thing at a Time † | Morgan Wallen | |
| May 27 | One Thing at a Time † | Morgan Wallen | |
| June 3 | One Thing at a Time † | Morgan Wallen | |
| June 10 | One Thing at a Time † | Morgan Wallen | |
| June 17 | One Thing at a Time † | Morgan Wallen | |
| June 24 | One Thing at a Time † | Morgan Wallen | |
| July 1 | One Thing at a Time † | Morgan Wallen | |
| July 8 | One Thing at a Time † | Morgan Wallen | |
| July 15 | One Thing at a Time † | Morgan Wallen | |
| July 22 | Speak Now (Taylor's Version) | Taylor Swift | |
| July 29 | One Thing at a Time † | Morgan Wallen | |
| August 5 | Barbie the Album | Soundtrack | |
| August 12 | Utopia | Travis Scott | |
| August 19 | Utopia | Travis Scott | |
| August 26 | One Thing at a Time † | Morgan Wallen | |
| September 2 | One Thing at a Time † | Morgan Wallen | |
| September 9 | Zach Bryan | Zach Bryan | |
| September 16 | Zach Bryan | Zach Bryan | |
| September 23 | Guts | Olivia Rodrigo | |
| September 30 | One Thing at a Time † | Morgan Wallen | |
| October 7 | One Thing at a Time † | Morgan Wallen | |
| October 14 | One Thing at a Time † | Morgan Wallen | |
| October 21 | For All the Dogs | Drake | |
| October 28 | For All the Dogs | Drake | |
| November 4 | For All the Dogs | Drake | |
| November 11 | 1989 (Taylor's Version) | Taylor Swift | |
| November 18 | 1989 (Taylor's Version) | Taylor Swift | |
| November 25 | 1989 (Taylor's Version) | Taylor Swift | |
| December 2 | For All the Dogs | Drake | |
| December 9 | 1989 (Taylor's Version) | Taylor Swift | |
| December 16 | Christmas | Michael Bublé | |
| December 23 | Christmas | Michael Bublé | |
| December 30 | Christmas | Michael Bublé | |

== See also ==
- List of Canadian Hot 100 number-one singles of 2023
