= LP Giobbi =

American DJ and producer

- Born: Leah Chisholm; August 19, 1987 (age 38)
- Genres: House, electronic, dance
- Occupations: DJ, producer
- Years active: 2016–present
- Labels: Animal Talk, Counter Records, YES YES YES
- Website: www.lpgiobbi.com

Leah Chisholm (born August 19, 1987), known professionally as LP Giobbi, is an American DJ and music producer. As a classically-trained jazz pianist, she is known for her style of piano house music.

== Biography ==
Giobbi was born and raised in Eugene, Oregon. She graduated from UC Berkeley in 2008, having studied classical jazz piano. During this time, she met Lauren Spalding (known professionally as hermixalot), who has become her frequent collaborator in music and business. After graduating from UC Berkeley, Giobbi played jazz piano gigs until she was approached by a producer for Daft Punk, who invited her to join an all-female electronic band composed of jazz musicians. Although the band didn't work out for Giobbi, it sparked her interest in production and electronic music.

After learning the music program Ableton Live, Giobbi started producing her own dance music with guidance from Sophie Hawley-Weld and Tucker Halpern of the house duo Sofi Tukker. Giobbi went on to open for the duo's tour across the U.S. and Europe in 2017. In 2018, Giobbi, Sofi Tukker, and hermixalot co-founded the label "Animal Talk," soon followed by her first single under Animal Talk — "Amber Rose" featuring hermixalot. Giobbi continued to collaborate with hermixalot on many of her singles through 2022. In 2019, Giobbi and hermixalot co-founded Femme House, a non-profit organization that expands opportunities for "women, gender-expansive, BIPOC, and LGBTQIA+ creatives" in the music industry. Giobbi's experience as the only woman in her Ableton classes inspired her to create Femme House and offer free workshops, bootcamps, and online courses on music production.

Giobbi was named music director, North America for W Hotels in October 2019. As of 2023, she serves as Global Director of Music for the brand.

Her parents' love for The Grateful Dead inspired Giobbi's love for music, as well as one of her musical projects, Dead House. In 2022, Giobbi began incorporating stems from The Grateful Dead songs into her livestreamed house music sets, which she called Dead House. Giobbi put together a full Dead House set for Playing in the Sand 2022, an all-inclusive music festival hosted by Dead & Company in Mexico, but the festival was cancelled due to a spike in COVID-19 cases. In 2023, Giobbi was asked by the late Jerry Garcia's estate to remix his self-titled debut album, Garcia (1973), ahead of the album's 50th anniversary. She released Garcia (Remixed) in January 2023. Later that year, Giobbi performed her Dead House sets at 7 official Dead & Company afterparties on their final tour.

In June 2023 Giobbi's song "Can't Let You Go" was featured during Apple Inc's WWDC keynote event as part of the official music playlist.

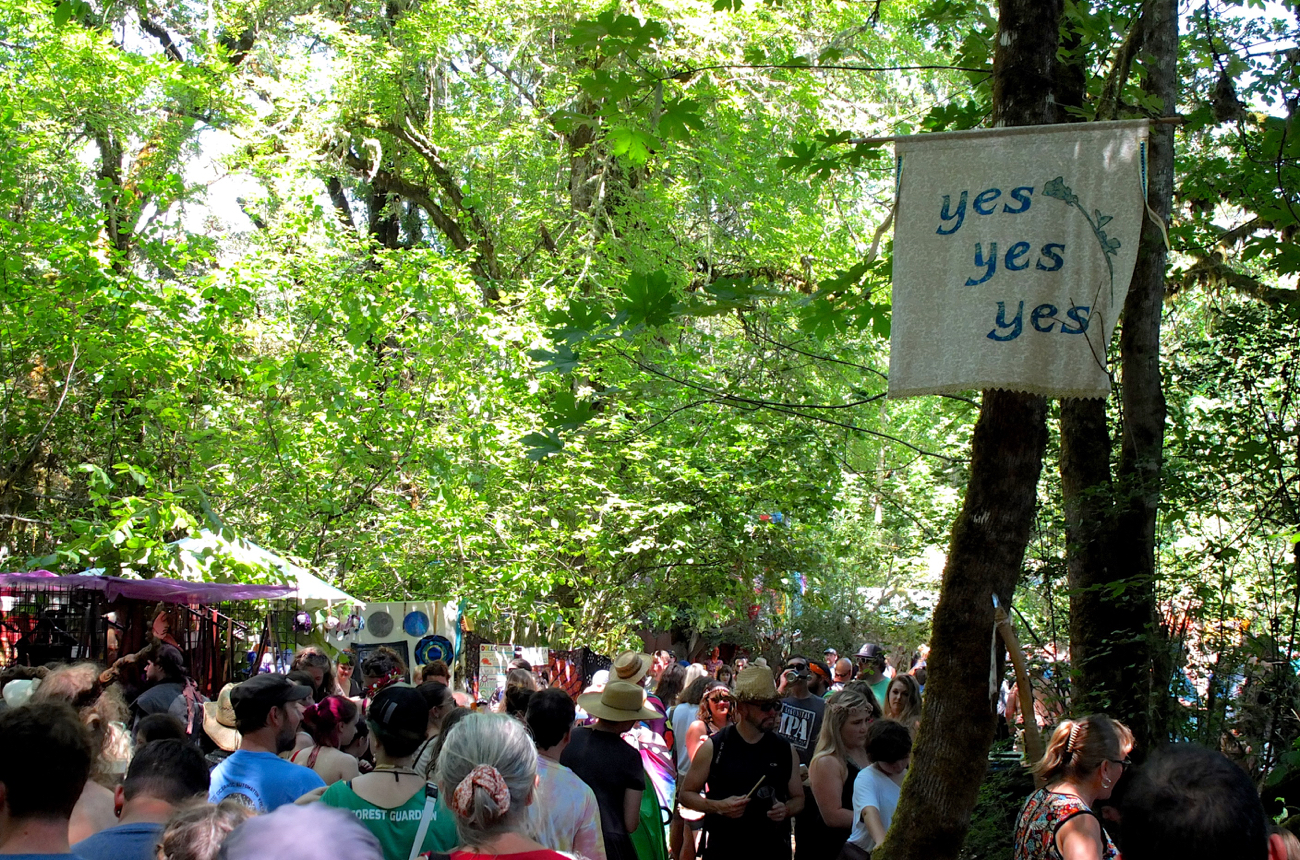
Oregon Country Fair attendees pictured underneath a sign reading "Yes Yes Yes"

In September 2023, Giobbi launched the label "Yes Yes Yes" under Defected Records. The label's name is inspired by the signs displayed at the entrance of the Oregon Country Fair, which read "YES YES YES". Giobbi released "Time Expands" as her first single under Yes Yes Yes, as well as her first track to feature her own vocals.

Returning to her hometown, Eugene, Oregon, in July 2023 she headlined the Oregon Country Fair, becoming the first electronic act to do so. In October 2023, Taylor Swift released Giobbi's remix of her single "Cruel Summer".

== Discography ==
=== Albums ===
- Light Places, Counter Records (2023)
- Garcia (Remixed) (2023)
- DOTR, Counter Records (2024)

=== Compilations ===
- LP Giobbi x Insomniac Records Presents Femme House, 2022

== Tours ==
=== Headline tours ===
- The Femme House Tour (2022)
- Light Places Tour (2023)
- Way Back Home Tour (2024)

== Awards and nominations ==
=== DJ Mag ===
Year	Nominee / work	Award	Result
2022	LP Giobbi	Breakthrough Producer	Nominated
2023	LP Giobbi	Best Producer	Won
