= List of Canadian Hot 100 number-one singles of 2023 =

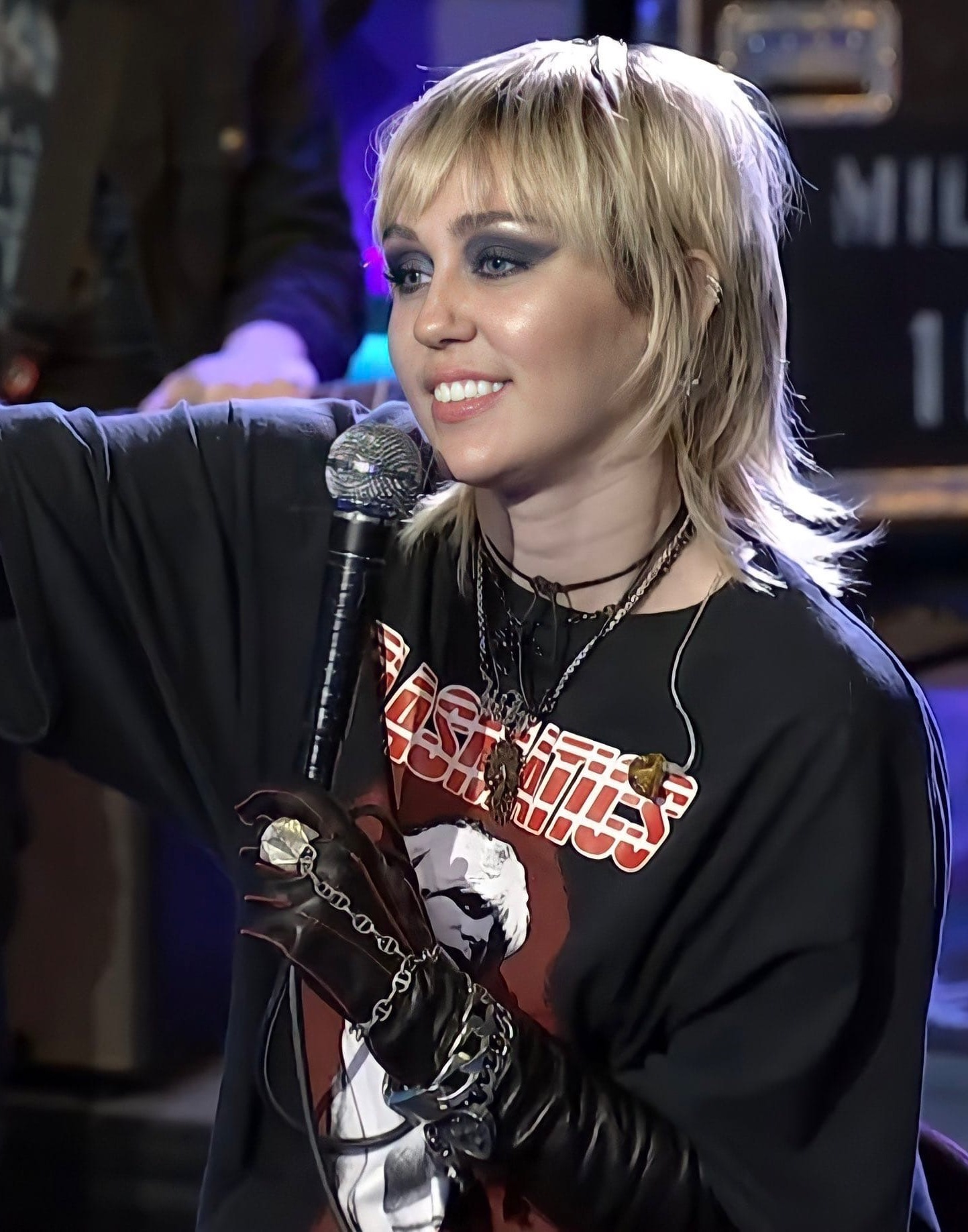
"Flowers" by Miley Cyrus (pictured) is the longest-running number-one song of 2023, spending fifteen consecutive weeks atop the Canadian Hot 100. It later ranked as the best-performing song of the year.

This is a list of the Canadian Hot 100 number-one songs of 2023. The Canadian Hot 100 is a chart that ranks the best-performing songs of Canada. Its data, published by Billboard magazine and compiled by Luminate, is based collectively on each song's weekly physical and digital sales, as well as airplay and streaming.

== Chart history ==
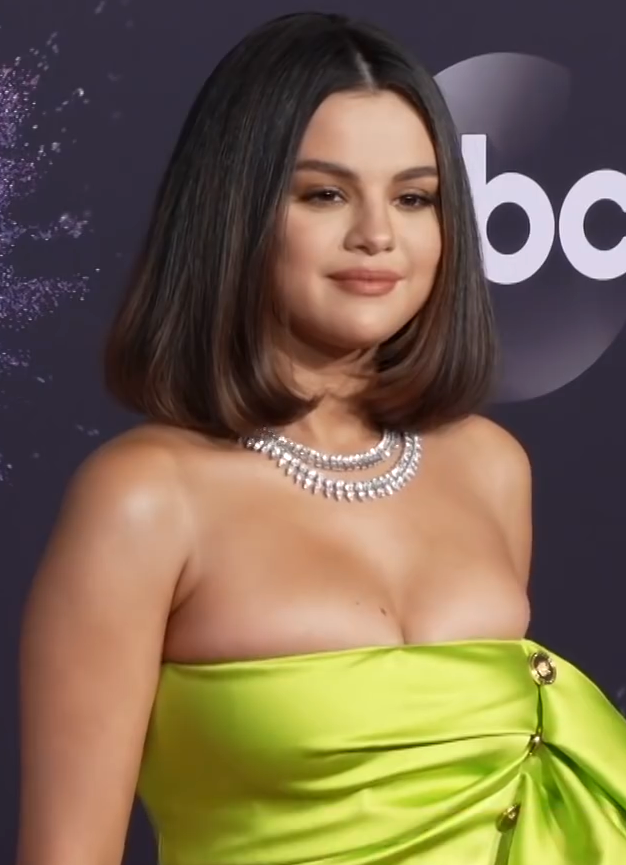
"Calm Down" by Rema and Selena Gomez (pictured) spent nine consecutive weeks at number one, and became the first Afrobeats song to top the Canadian Hot 100.

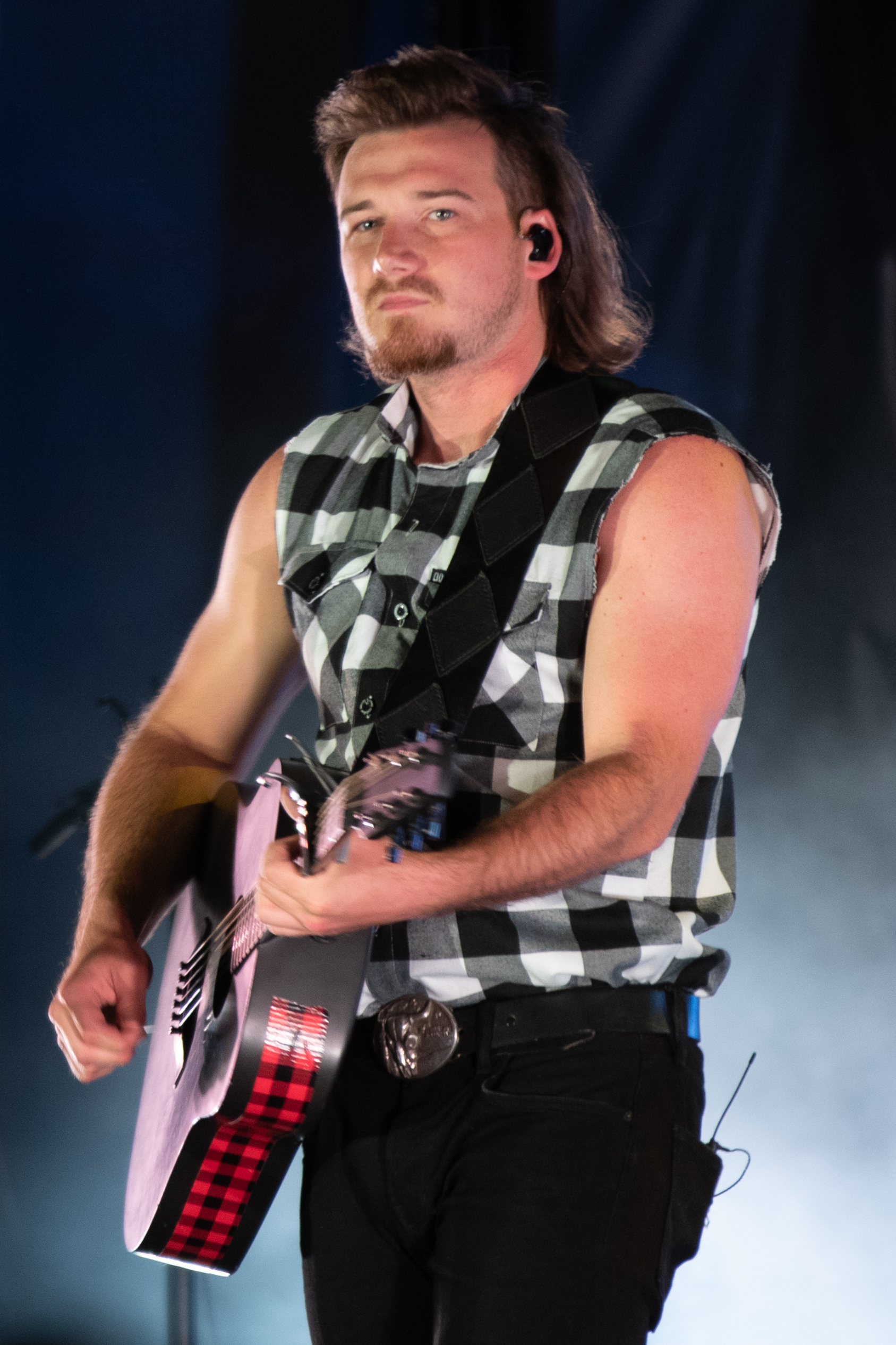
Morgan Wallen (pictured) earned his first number-one song with "Last Night". It spent six weeks atop the chart.

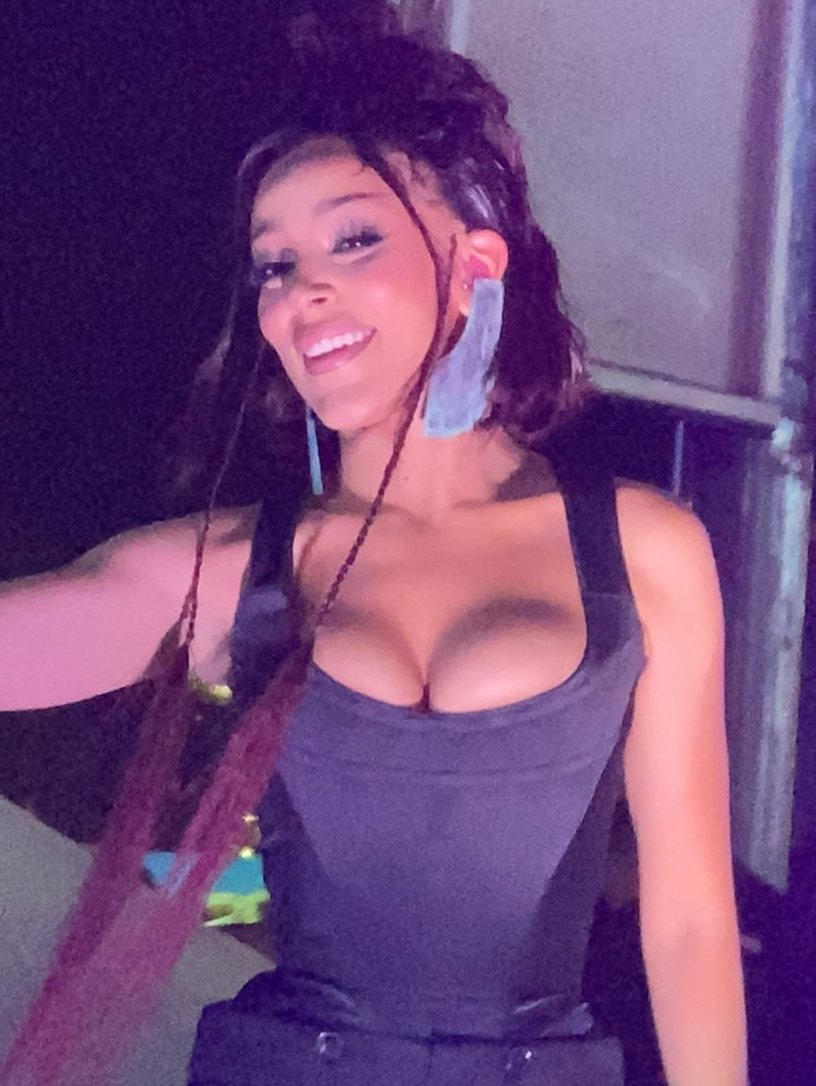
Doja Cat (pictured) earned her first number-one song with "Paint the Town Red", which spent six consecutive weeks at number one.

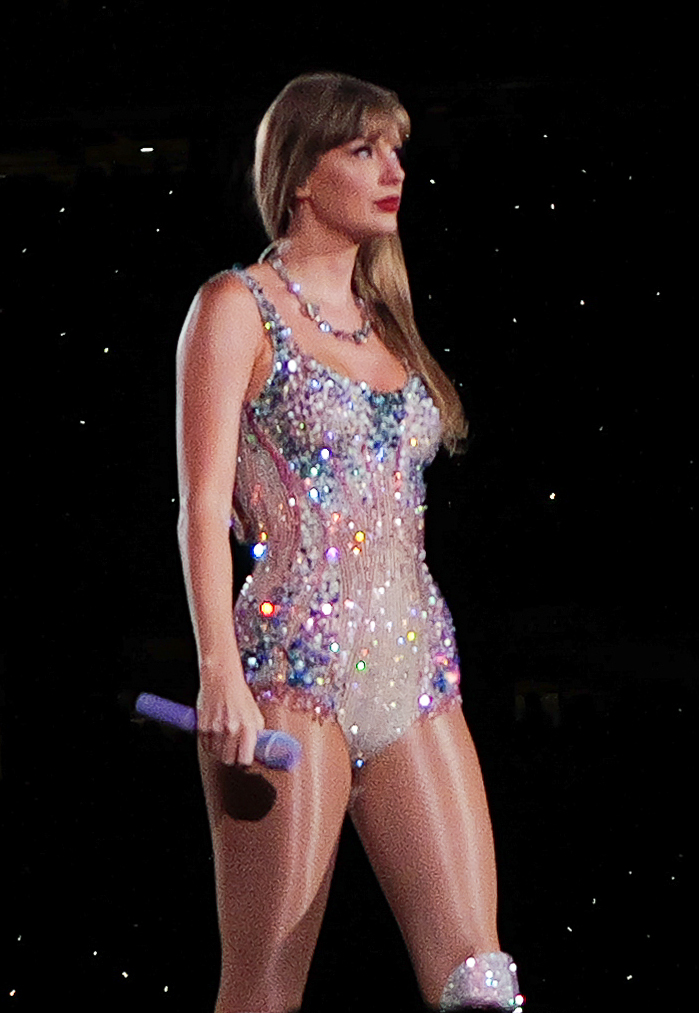
Taylor Swift (pictured) scored two number-one songs with "Cruel Summer" and "Is It Over Now?", becoming the first artist to replace herself atop the chart two weeks in a row.

Key
†	Indicates best-performing song of 2023

List of number-one songs
No.	Issue date	Song	Artist(s)	Ref.
188	January 7	"Rockin' Around the Christmas Tree"	Brenda Lee	
re	January 14	"I'm Good (Blue)"	David Guetta and Bebe Rexha	
re	January 21	"I'm Good (Blue)"	David Guetta and Bebe Rexha	
189	January 28	"Flowers" †	Miley Cyrus	
189	February 4	"Flowers" †	Miley Cyrus	
189	February 11	"Flowers" †	Miley Cyrus	
189	February 18	"Flowers" †	Miley Cyrus	
189	February 25	"Flowers" †	Miley Cyrus	
189	March 4	"Flowers" †	Miley Cyrus	
189	March 11	"Flowers" †	Miley Cyrus	
189	March 18	"Flowers" †	Miley Cyrus	
189	March 25	"Flowers" †	Miley Cyrus	
189	April 1	"Flowers" †	Miley Cyrus	
189	April 8	"Flowers" †	Miley Cyrus	
189	April 15	"Flowers" †	Miley Cyrus	
189	April 22	"Flowers" †	Miley Cyrus	
189	April 29	"Flowers" †	Miley Cyrus	
189	May 6	"Flowers" †	Miley Cyrus	
190	May 13	"Calm Down"	Rema and Selena Gomez	
190	May 20	"Calm Down"	Rema and Selena Gomez	
190	May 27	"Calm Down"	Rema and Selena Gomez	
190	June 3	"Calm Down"	Rema and Selena Gomez	
190	June 10	"Calm Down"	Rema and Selena Gomez	
190	June 17	"Calm Down"	Rema and Selena Gomez	
190	June 24	"Calm Down"	Rema and Selena Gomez	
190	July 1	"Calm Down"	Rema and Selena Gomez	
190	July 8	"Calm Down"	Rema and Selena Gomez	
191	July 15	"Vampire"	Olivia Rodrigo	
192	July 22	"Last Night"	Morgan Wallen	
192	July 29	"Last Night"	Morgan Wallen	
192	August 5	"Last Night"	Morgan Wallen	
193	August 12	"Meltdown"	Travis Scott featuring Drake	
re	August 19	"Last Night"	Morgan Wallen	
re	August 26	"Last Night"	Morgan Wallen	
re	September 2	"Last Night"	Morgan Wallen	
194	September 9	"Paint the Town Red"	Doja Cat	
194	September 16	"Paint the Town Red"	Doja Cat	
194	September 23	"Paint the Town Red"	Doja Cat	
194	September 30	"Paint the Town Red"	Doja Cat	
194	October 7	"Paint the Town Red"	Doja Cat	
194	October 14	"Paint the Town Red"	Doja Cat	
195	October 21	"IDGAF"	Drake featuring Yeat	
196	October 28	"Cruel Summer"	Taylor Swift	
196	November 4	"Cruel Summer"	Taylor Swift	
197	November 11	"Is It Over Now?"	Taylor Swift	
re	November 18	"Cruel Summer"	Taylor Swift	
re	November 25	"Cruel Summer"	Taylor Swift	
198	December 2	"Greedy"	Tate McRae	
199	December 9	"Lovin on Me"	Jack Harlow	
re	December 16	"All I Want for Christmas Is You"	Mariah Carey	
re	December 23	"All I Want for Christmas Is You"	Mariah Carey	
re	December 30	"All I Want for Christmas Is You"	Mariah Carey	

== See also ==
- List of number-one albums of 2023 (Canada)
