= List of Radio Songs number ones of the 2020s =

This is a list of songs which received the most airplay per week on radio stations in the United States as ranked and published by Billboard magazine on the Radio Songs (formerly Hot 100 Airplay) chart during the 2020s.

== Number-one airplay hits ==
Key
†	Indicates best-performing radio song of the year

Issue date	Song	Artist(s)	Weekly audience
2020
January 4	"Circles" †	Post Malone	98.3 million
January 11	"Circles" †	Post Malone	102.1 million
January 18	"Circles" †	Post Malone	101.3 million
January 25	"Circles" †	Post Malone	100.3 million
February 1	"Circles" †	Post Malone	102.8 million
February 8	"Memories"	Maroon 5	102.6 million
February 15	"Circles" †	Post Malone	103.6 million
February 22	"Circles" †	Post Malone	104.5 million
February 29	"Circles" †	Post Malone	104.5 million
March 7	"Circles" †	Post Malone	101.3 million
March 14	"Circles" †	Post Malone	101.1 million
March 21	"Don't Start Now"	Dua Lipa	97.8 million
March 28	"Don't Start Now"	Dua Lipa	100 million
April 4	"Don't Start Now"	Dua Lipa	98.2 million
April 11	"Don't Start Now"	Dua Lipa	98.8 million
April 18	"Blinding Lights"	The Weeknd	104.7 million
April 25	"Blinding Lights"	The Weeknd	108.6 million
May 2	"Blinding Lights"	The Weeknd	110.3 million
May 9	"Blinding Lights"	The Weeknd	109.7 million
May 16	"Blinding Lights"	The Weeknd	114.5 million
May 23	"Blinding Lights"	The Weeknd	114.6 million
May 30	"Blinding Lights"	The Weeknd	89 million
June 6	"Blinding Lights"	The Weeknd	77.4 million
June 13	"Blinding Lights"	The Weeknd	76.3 million
June 20	"Blinding Lights"	The Weeknd	75.2 million
June 27	"Blinding Lights"	The Weeknd	74.3 million
July 4	"Blinding Lights"	The Weeknd	76.8 million
July 11	"Blinding Lights"	The Weeknd	77.3 million
July 18	"Blinding Lights"	The Weeknd	77.3 million
July 25	"Blinding Lights"	The Weeknd	76.4 million
August 1	"Blinding Lights"	The Weeknd	74.7 million
August 8	"Blinding Lights"	The Weeknd	76.2 million
August 15	"Blinding Lights"	The Weeknd	79.2 million
August 22	"Blinding Lights"	The Weeknd	80.5 million
August 29	"Blinding Lights"	The Weeknd	78.7 million
September 5	"Blinding Lights"	The Weeknd	80.2 million
September 12	"Blinding Lights"	The Weeknd	79.6 million
September 19	"Blinding Lights"	The Weeknd	79.9 million
September 26	"Before You Go"	Lewis Capaldi	79.1 million
October 3	"Before You Go"	Lewis Capaldi	—N/a
October 10	"Blinding Lights"	The Weeknd	80.1 million
October 17	"Blinding Lights"	The Weeknd	79.4 million
October 24	"Blinding Lights"	The Weeknd	76.8 million
October 31	"I Hope"	Gabby Barrett featuring Charlie Puth	76.2 million
November 7	"Mood"	24kGoldn featuring Iann Dior	79 million
November 14	"Mood"	24kGoldn featuring Iann Dior	84.2 million
November 21	"Mood"	24kGoldn featuring Iann Dior	85 million
November 28	"Mood"	24kGoldn featuring Iann Dior	84.5 million
December 5	"Mood"	24kGoldn featuring Iann Dior	87.3 million
December 12	"Mood"	24kGoldn featuring Iann Dior	86.5 million
December 19	"Mood"	24kGoldn featuring Iann Dior	84.2 million
December 26	"Mood"	24kGoldn featuring Iann Dior	83.6 million
2021
January 2	"Mood"	24kGoldn featuring Iann Dior	81.3 million
January 9	"Mood"	24kGoldn featuring Iann Dior	82.3 million
January 16	"Mood"	24kGoldn featuring Iann Dior	84.2 million
January 23	"Go Crazy"	Chris Brown & Young Thug	—N/a
January 30	"Go Crazy"	Chris Brown & Young Thug	82.1 million
February 6	"Go Crazy"	Chris Brown & Young Thug	82.4 million
February 13	"Go Crazy"	Chris Brown & Young Thug	83 million
February 20	"Go Crazy"	Chris Brown & Young Thug	81.1 million
February 27	"Go Crazy"	Chris Brown & Young Thug	79.1 million
March 6	"Go Crazy"	Chris Brown & Young Thug	77.6 million
March 13	"Go Crazy"	Chris Brown & Young Thug	74.7 million
March 20	"Drivers License"	Olivia Rodrigo	74.3 million
March 27	"Drivers License"	Olivia Rodrigo	72.3 million
April 3	"Drivers License"	Olivia Rodrigo	70 million
April 10	"Drivers License"	Olivia Rodrigo	68.2 million
April 17	"Drivers License"	Olivia Rodrigo	62.8 million
April 24	"Leave the Door Open"	Silk Sonic (Note: Silk Sonic is a superduo consisting of American singers Bruno Mars and Anderson .Paak, both of whom are also credited individually for the song on the Billboard charts.)	65.5 million
May 1	"Leave the Door Open"	Silk Sonic	71.3 million
May 8	"Leave the Door Open"	Silk Sonic	77 million
May 15	"Leave the Door Open"	Silk Sonic	80.9 million
May 22	"Leave the Door Open"	Silk Sonic	87 million
May 29	"Leave the Door Open"	Silk Sonic	89.9 million
June 5	"Leave the Door Open"	Silk Sonic	89 million
June 12	"Leave the Door Open"	Silk Sonic	91.2 million
June 19	"Leave the Door Open"	Silk Sonic	89 million
June 26	"Leave the Door Open"	Silk Sonic	82.3 million
July 3	"Levitating" †	Dua Lipa	80.7 million
July 10	"Levitating" †	Dua Lipa	80.6 million
July 17	"Levitating" †	Dua Lipa	79.7 million
July 24	"Levitating" †	Dua Lipa	79.9 million
July 31	"Levitating" †	Dua Lipa	81.4 million
August 7	"Levitating" †	Dua Lipa	80.4 million
August 14	"Levitating" †	Dua Lipa	77.8 million
August 21	"Good 4 U"	Olivia Rodrigo	77.4 million
August 28	"Good 4 U"	Olivia Rodrigo	77 million
September 4	"Good 4 U"	Olivia Rodrigo	76.3 million
September 11	"Bad Habits"	Ed Sheeran	75.8 million
September 18	"Bad Habits"	Ed Sheeran	76.4 million
September 25	"Stay" †	The Kid Laroi & Justin Bieber	79.3 million
October 2	"Stay" †	The Kid Laroi & Justin Bieber	81.3 million
October 9	"Stay" †	The Kid Laroi & Justin Bieber	81.4 million
October 16	"Stay" †	The Kid Laroi & Justin Bieber	86.4 million
October 23	"Stay" †	The Kid Laroi & Justin Bieber	89.2 million
October 30	"Stay" †	The Kid Laroi & Justin Bieber	90.9 million
November 6	"Stay" †	The Kid Laroi & Justin Bieber	90.8 million
November 13	"Stay" †	The Kid Laroi & Justin Bieber	89.5 million
November 20	"Stay" †	The Kid Laroi & Justin Bieber	89.2 million
November 27	"Stay" †	The Kid Laroi & Justin Bieber	86.9 million
December 4	"Easy on Me"	Adele	93.2 million
December 11	"Easy on Me"	Adele	87.1 million
December 18	"Easy on Me"	Adele	85.4 million
December 25	"Easy on Me"	Adele	86.6 million
2022
January 1	"Easy on Me"	Adele	86 million
January 8	"Easy on Me"	Adele	94 million
January 15	"Easy on Me"	Adele	99 million
January 22	"Easy on Me"	Adele	101.2 million
January 29	"Easy on Me"	Adele	99 million
February 5	"Easy on Me"	Adele	94.6 million
February 12	"Easy on Me"	Adele	88.3 million
February 19	"Easy on Me"	Adele	85.3 million
February 26	"Easy on Me"	Adele	77.3 million
March 5	"Easy on Me"	Adele	71.5 million
March 12	"Easy on Me"	Adele	67.8 million
March 19	"Heat Waves"	Glass Animals	65.6 million
March 26	"Heat Waves"	Glass Animals	67.3 million
April 2	"Heat Waves"	Glass Animals	66.7 million
April 9	"Heat Waves"	Glass Animals	65.1 million
April 16	"Heat Waves"	Glass Animals	63.3 million
April 23	"Heat Waves"	Glass Animals	63.4 million
April 30	"Big Energy"	Latto	65.3 million
May 7	"Enemy"	Imagine Dragons and JID	66 million
May 14	"Enemy"	Imagine Dragons and JID	65.9 million
May 21	"As It Was"	Harry Styles	65.9 million
May 28	"As It Was"	Harry Styles	70.1 million
June 4	"As It Was"	Harry Styles	73.7 million
June 11	"As It Was"	Harry Styles	72.4 million
June 18	"First Class"	Jack Harlow	79.3 million
June 25	"First Class"	Jack Harlow	82.1 million
July 2	"First Class"	Jack Harlow	84.3 million
July 9	"First Class"	Jack Harlow	85.5 million
July 16	"About Damn Time"	Lizzo	83.2 million
July 23	"About Damn Time"	Lizzo	85.9 million
July 30	"About Damn Time"	Lizzo	88.2 million
August 6	"About Damn Time"	Lizzo	91.1 million
August 13	"About Damn Time"	Lizzo	93.9 million
August 20	"About Damn Time"	Lizzo	88.5 million
August 27	"About Damn Time"	Lizzo	82.4 million
September 3	"About Damn Time"	Lizzo	74.3 million
September 10	"About Damn Time"	Lizzo	70 million
September 17	"As It Was"	Harry Styles	68.4 million
September 24	"As It Was"	Harry Styles	68.2 million
October 1	"As It Was"	Harry Styles	66 million
October 8	"As It Was"	Harry Styles	62.8 million
October 15	"Sunroof"	Nicky Youre and Dazy	60 million
October 22	"As It Was"	Harry Styles	60 million
October 29	"As It Was"	Harry Styles	61.4 million
November 5	"As It Was"	Harry Styles	—N/a
November 12	"As It Was"	Harry Styles	60.2 million
November 19	"Bad Habit"	Steve Lacy	—N/a
November 26	"Unholy"	Sam Smith and Kim Petras	66.3 million
December 3	"Unholy"	Sam Smith and Kim Petras	71.9 million
December 10	"Unholy"	Sam Smith and Kim Petras	77.4 million
December 17	"Unholy"	Sam Smith and Kim Petras	78.6 million
December 24	"Unholy"	Sam Smith and Kim Petras	78.3 million
December 31	"Anti-Hero"	Taylor Swift	79.4 million
2023
January 7	"Anti-Hero"	Taylor Swift	80.3 million
January 14	"Anti-Hero"	Taylor Swift	83.8 million
January 21	"Anti-Hero"	Taylor Swift	88.5 million
January 28	"Anti-Hero"	Taylor Swift	88.5 million
February 4	"I'm Good (Blue)"	David Guetta and Bebe Rexha	85 million
February 11	"Die for You"	The Weeknd	85.2 million
February 18	"Die for You"	The Weeknd	84 million
February 25	"Flowers" †	Miley Cyrus	85.8 million
March 4	"Flowers" †	Miley Cyrus	95.2 million
March 11	"Flowers" †	Miley Cyrus	102.1 million
March 18	"Flowers" †	Miley Cyrus	105.8 million
March 25	"Flowers" †	Miley Cyrus	106.7 million
April 1	"Flowers" †	Miley Cyrus	107.9 million
April 8	"Flowers" †	Miley Cyrus	106.9 million
April 15	"Flowers" †	Miley Cyrus	102.2 million
April 22	"Flowers" †	Miley Cyrus	93.5 million
April 29	"Flowers" †	Miley Cyrus	92.7 million
May 6	"Flowers" †	Miley Cyrus	91.6 million
May 13	"Flowers" †	Miley Cyrus	90.7 million
May 20	"Flowers" †	Miley Cyrus	91.5 million
May 27	"Flowers" †	Miley Cyrus	91.2 million
June 3	"Flowers" †	Miley Cyrus	89.7 million
June 10	"Flowers" †	Miley Cyrus	86.8 million
June 17	"Flowers" †	Miley Cyrus	87 million
June 24	"Flowers" †	Miley Cyrus	85.9 million
July 1	"Calm Down"	Rema and Selena Gomez	87.3 million
July 8	"Calm Down"	Rema and Selena Gomez	90.1 million
July 15	"Calm Down"	Rema and Selena Gomez	92 million
July 22	"Calm Down"	Rema and Selena Gomez	92.2 million
July 29	"Calm Down"	Rema and Selena Gomez	92.9 million
August 5	"Calm Down"	Rema and Selena Gomez	90.7 million
August 12	"Calm Down"	Rema and Selena Gomez	89.2 million
August 19	"Calm Down"	Rema and Selena Gomez	88 million
August 26	"Calm Down"	Rema and Selena Gomez	85.9 million
September 2	"Calm Down"	Rema and Selena Gomez	83.5 million
September 9	"Fast Car"	Luke Combs	78.8 million
September 16	"Fast Car"	Luke Combs	77.8 million
September 23	"Fast Car"	Luke Combs	77.3 million
September 30	"Fast Car"	Luke Combs	76.6 million
October 7	"Cruel Summer"	Taylor Swift	76.1 million
October 14	"Snooze"	SZA	75.8 million
October 21	"Snooze"	SZA	77.9 million
October 28	"Snooze"	SZA	80 million
November 4	"Cruel Summer"	Taylor Swift	80.1 million
November 11	"Cruel Summer"	Taylor Swift	75.4 million
November 18	"Cruel Summer"	Taylor Swift	77.8 million
November 25	"Cruel Summer"	Taylor Swift	73.9 million
December 2	"Cruel Summer"	Taylor Swift	68.8 million
December 9	"Paint the Town Red"	Doja Cat	65.8 million
December 16	"Cruel Summer"	Taylor Swift	63.6 million
December 23	"Cruel Summer"	Taylor Swift	—N/a
December 30	"Cruel Summer"	Taylor Swift	—N/a
2024
January 6	"Cruel Summer"	Taylor Swift	64.6 million
January 13	"Cruel Summer"	Taylor Swift	72.6 million
January 20	"Cruel Summer"	Taylor Swift	69.4 million
January 27	"Lovin on Me"	Jack Harlow	67 million
February 3	"Lovin on Me"	Jack Harlow	74 million
February 10	"Lovin on Me"	Jack Harlow	75.9 million
February 17	"Lovin on Me"	Jack Harlow	76.7 million
February 24	"Lovin on Me"	Jack Harlow	77.8 million
March 2	"Lovin on Me"	Jack Harlow	—N/a
March 9	"Lovin on Me"	Jack Harlow	79.4 million
March 16	"Lovin on Me"	Jack Harlow	76.5 million
March 23	"Lovin on Me"	Jack Harlow	75.2 million
March 30	"Lovin on Me"	Jack Harlow	73.9 million
April 6	"Lovin on Me"	Jack Harlow	69.9 million
April 13	"Lovin on Me"	Jack Harlow	66 million
April 20	"Lose Control" †	Teddy Swims	69.7 million
April 27	"Lose Control" †	Teddy Swims	69.9 million
May 4	"Lose Control" †	Teddy Swims	69.5 million
May 11	"Lose Control" †	Teddy Swims	70.4 million
May 18	"Lose Control" †	Teddy Swims	73 million
May 25	"Lose Control" †	Teddy Swims	73.8 million
June 1	"Lose Control" †	Teddy Swims	73.4 million
June 8	"Lose Control" †	Teddy Swims	69.3 million
June 15	"Lose Control" †	Teddy Swims	71.2 million
June 22	"Too Sweet"	Hozier	70.5 million
June 29	"Too Sweet"	Hozier	73.5 million
July 6	"I Had Some Help"	Post Malone featuring Morgan Wallen	76.5 million
July 13	"I Had Some Help"	Post Malone featuring Morgan Wallen	79.7 million
July 20	"I Had Some Help"	Post Malone featuring Morgan Wallen	81 million
July 27	"I Had Some Help"	Post Malone featuring Morgan Wallen	84.8 million
August 3	"I Had Some Help"	Post Malone featuring Morgan Wallen	85.5 million
August 10	"A Bar Song (Tipsy)"	Shaboozey	90.2 million
August 17	"A Bar Song (Tipsy)"	Shaboozey	90.5 million
August 24	"A Bar Song (Tipsy)"	Shaboozey	88.5 million
August 31	"A Bar Song (Tipsy)"	Shaboozey	88.2 million
September 7	"A Bar Song (Tipsy)"	Shaboozey	82 million
September 14	"A Bar Song (Tipsy)"	Shaboozey	77.9 million
September 21	"A Bar Song (Tipsy)"	Shaboozey	76.8 million
September 28	"A Bar Song (Tipsy)"	Shaboozey	75.3 million
October 5	"A Bar Song (Tipsy)"	Shaboozey	78.2 million
October 12	"A Bar Song (Tipsy)"	Shaboozey	76.2 million
October 19	"A Bar Song (Tipsy)"	Shaboozey	75.6 million
October 26	"A Bar Song (Tipsy)"	Shaboozey	74 million
November 2	"A Bar Song (Tipsy)"	Shaboozey	72.2 million
November 9	"A Bar Song (Tipsy)"	Shaboozey	72.6 million
November 16	"A Bar Song (Tipsy)"	Shaboozey	70.7 million
November 23	"A Bar Song (Tipsy)"	Shaboozey	69.2 million
November 30	"A Bar Song (Tipsy)"	Shaboozey	69.5 million
December 7	"A Bar Song (Tipsy)"	Shaboozey	68.3 million
December 14	"A Bar Song (Tipsy)"	Shaboozey	64.9 million
December 21	"A Bar Song (Tipsy)"	Shaboozey	62.9 million
December 28	"A Bar Song (Tipsy)"	Shaboozey	—N/a
2025
January 4	"A Bar Song (Tipsy)"	Shaboozey	—N/a
January 11	"A Bar Song (Tipsy)"	Shaboozey	68 million
January 18	"A Bar Song (Tipsy)"	Shaboozey	66.2 million
January 25	"A Bar Song (Tipsy)"	Shaboozey	63.2 million
February 1	"A Bar Song (Tipsy)"	Shaboozey	63.2 million
February 8	"A Bar Song (Tipsy)"	Shaboozey	63.3 million
February 15	"Die with a Smile" †	Lady Gaga and Bruno Mars	62.5 million
February 22	"Die with a Smile" †	Lady Gaga and Bruno Mars	63.5 million
March 1	"Die with a Smile" †	Lady Gaga and Bruno Mars	63 million
March 8	"Die with a Smile" †	Lady Gaga and Bruno Mars	63.3 million
March 15	"Die with a Smile" †	Lady Gaga and Bruno Mars	64.7 million
March 22	"Die with a Smile" †	Lady Gaga and Bruno Mars	62.9 million
March 29	"Die with a Smile" †	Lady Gaga and Bruno Mars	63.9 million
April 5	"Die with a Smile" †	Lady Gaga and Bruno Mars	61.1 million
April 12	"Luther"	Kendrick Lamar and SZA	61 million
April 19	"Luther"	Kendrick Lamar and SZA	63.1 million
April 26	"Luther"	Kendrick Lamar and SZA	67.5 million
May 3	"Luther"	Kendrick Lamar and SZA	68.4 million
May 10	"Luther"	Kendrick Lamar and SZA	67.9 million
May 17	"Luther"	Kendrick Lamar and SZA	65.4 million
May 24	"Anxiety"	Doechii	65 million
May 31	"Anxiety"	Doechii	—N/a
June 7	"Anxiety"	Doechii	—N/a
June 14	"Anxiety"	Doechii	—N/a
June 21	"Anxiety"	Doechii	—N/a
June 28	"Ordinary"	Alex Warren	61.5 million
July 5	"Ordinary"	Alex Warren	64.2 million
July 12	"Ordinary"	Alex Warren	69.7 million
July 19	"Ordinary"	Alex Warren	73 million
July 26	"Ordinary"	Alex Warren	73 million
August 2	"Ordinary"	Alex Warren	74 million
August 9	"Ordinary"	Alex Warren	73.3 million
August 16	"Ordinary"	Alex Warren	73.6 million
August 23	"Ordinary"	Alex Warren	74 million
August 30	"Ordinary"	Alex Warren	73.8 million
September 6	"Ordinary"	Alex Warren	74 million
September 13	"Ordinary"	Alex Warren	73 million
September 20	"Ordinary"	Alex Warren	75.1 million
September 27	"Ordinary"	Alex Warren	76.1 million
October 4	"Ordinary"	Alex Warren	75.6 million
October 11	"Ordinary"	Alex Warren	76.8 million
October 18	"Ordinary"	Alex Warren	77.4 million
October 25	"Ordinary"	Alex Warren	78.5 million
November 1	"Ordinary"	Alex Warren	79 million
November 8	"Ordinary"	Alex Warren	78.5 million
November 15	"Ordinary"	Alex Warren	77.2 million
November 22	"Ordinary"	Alex Warren	74.3 million
November 29	"Ordinary"	Alex Warren	67.2 million
December 6	"Mutt"	Leon Thomas	64.4 million
December 13	"Mutt"	Leon Thomas	—N/a
December 20	"Mutt"	Leon Thomas	—N/a
December 27	"Mutt"	Leon Thomas	—N/a
2026
January 3	"Golden"	Huntrix	58.3 million
January 10	"Ordinary"	Alex Warren	67.8 million
January 17	"Ordinary"	Alex Warren	71.4 million
January 24	"Ordinary"	Alex Warren	67.5 million
January 31	"Ordinary"	Alex Warren	63.4 million
February 7	"Man I Need"	Olivia Dean	63.2 million
February 14	"Man I Need"	Olivia Dean	66.1 million
February 21	"Man I Need"	Olivia Dean	63.3 million
February 28	"I Just Might"	Bruno Mars	65.3 million
March 7	"I Just Might"	Bruno Mars	68.3 million
March 14	"I Just Might"	Bruno Mars	72.5 million
March 21	"I Just Might"	Bruno Mars	76.5 million
March 28	"I Just Might"	Bruno Mars	81.5 million
April 4	"I Just Might"	Bruno Mars	80.9 million
April 11	"I Just Might"	Bruno Mars	81 million
April 18	"I Just Might"	Bruno Mars	80.7 million
April 25	"I Just Might"	Bruno Mars	81.5 million
May 2	"I Just Might"	Bruno Mars	77 million
May 9	"I Just Might"	Bruno Mars	78.1 million
May 16	"I Just Might"	Bruno Mars	76.1 million
May 23	"I Just Might"	Bruno Mars	72.6 million
May 30	"I Just Might"	Bruno Mars	71.1 million
June 6	"I Just Might"	Bruno Mars	69.2 million
June 13	"I Just Might"	Bruno Mars	70.5 million
June 20	"I Just Might"	Bruno Mars	69 million
June 27	"I Just Might"	Bruno Mars	—N/a
July 4	"I Just Might"	Bruno Mars	—N/a
July 11	"I Just Might"	Bruno Mars	64.3 million
July 18	"I Just Might"	Bruno Mars	63.3 million
July 25	"So Easy (To Fall in Love)"	Olivia Dean	62.9 million
August 1	"So Easy (To Fall in Love)"	Olivia Dean	64.8 million
August 8	"So Easy (To Fall in Love)"	Olivia Dean	65.6 million
August 15	"Risk It All"	Bruno Mars	67.7 million
August 22	"Risk It All"	Bruno Mars	—N/a
August 29	"I Knew It, I Knew You"	Taylor Swift	64.7 million
September 5	"I Knew It, I Knew You"	Taylor Swift	66.6 million
September 12	"I Knew It, I Knew You"	Taylor Swift	74 million
September 19	"I Knew It, I Knew You"	Taylor Swift	64.6 million
September 26	"Dracula"	Tame Impala and Jennie	62.6 million
October 3	"Dracula"	Tame Impala and Jennie	62.6 million
October 10	"Dracula"	Tame Impala and Jennie	62.5 million
October 17	"Dracula"	Tame Impala and Jennie	62.5 million
October 24	"Dracula"	Tame Impala and Jennie	63.7 million
October 31	"Dracula"	Tame Impala and Jennie	63.2 million
November 7	"Dracula"	Tame Impala and Jennie	63 million
November 14	"Dracula"	Tame Impala and Jennie	62.6 million
November 21	"Dracula"	Tame Impala and Jennie	60.1 million

=== Artists by total cumulative weeks at number one ===
The following artists were featured at the top of the Radio Songs chart for the highest cumulative number of weeks during the 2020s. Some totals include in part or in whole weeks spent at number one as part of a collaboration.

Artist	Song(s)	Weeks at number one
Bruno Mars	"Leave the Door Open" "Die with a Smile" "I Just Might" "Risk It All"	41
The Weeknd	"Blinding Lights" "Die for You"	28
Shaboozey	"A Bar Song (Tipsy)"	27
Alex Warren	"Ordinary"	27
Taylor Swift	"Anti-Hero" "Cruel Summer" "I Knew It, I Knew You"	21
Miley Cyrus	"Flowers"	18
Jack Harlow	"First Class" "Lovin on Me"	16
Adele	"Easy on Me"	15
Harry Styles	"As It Was"	12
24kGoldn	"Mood"	11
Iann Dior	"Mood"	11
Dua Lipa	"Don't Start Now" "Levitating"	11
Silk Sonic - Anderson .Paak	"Leave the Door Open"	10
The Kid Laroi	"Stay"	10
Justin Bieber	"Stay"	10
Rema	"Calm Down"	10
Selena Gomez	"Calm Down"	10

=== Songs by total number of weeks at number one ===
The following songs were featured at the top of the Radio Songs chart for the highest number of weeks during the 2020s.

Song	Artist(s)	Weeks at number one
"A Bar Song (Tipsy)"	Shaboozey	27
"Ordinary"	Alex Warren	27
"Blinding Lights"	The Weeknd	26
"I Just Might"	Bruno Mars	21
"Flowers"	Miley Cyrus	18
"Easy on Me"	Adele	15
"As It Was"	Harry Styles	12
"Cruel Summer"	Taylor Swift	12
"Lovin on Me"	Jack Harlow	12
"Mood"	24kGoldn featuring Iann Dior	11
"Leave the Door Open"	Silk Sonic	10
"Stay"	The Kid Laroi and Justin Bieber	10
"Calm Down"	Rema and Selena Gomez	10

== See also ==
- 2020 in American music
- List of Billboard Hot 100 number-one singles of the 2020s
