= The Kid Laroi discography =

- The Kid Laroi in 2023
- Studio albums: 2
- EPs: 1
- Singles: 42
- Music videos: 41
- Mixtapes: 1
- Reissues: 1
- Promotional singles: 1

The discography of Australian singer and rapper the Kid Laroi consists of two studio albums, one mixtape, two extended plays (EP), 42 singles (including four as a featured artist), one promotional singles, and 41 music videos. In 2018, Laroi independently released his first EP, 14 with a Dream, through SoundCloud and YouTube. He signed a joint deal with Grade A Productions and Columbia Records the next year before making his major label debut with the single "Let Her Go". Laroi built on the success of the song with other singles in early 2020, such as the US platinum-certified "Diva", which features Lil Tecca, and viral TikTok hit, "Addison Rae".

In June 2020, Laroi released a collaboration with Juice Wrld, "Go", which entered the top 40 in Australia, Canada, and New Zealand. His debut mixtape, F*ck Love, dropped a month later. The project reached number one on the ARIA Albums Chart, making him the youngest Australian solo artist to reach the chart's summit. It also eventually peaked atop the Billboard 200 following multiple reissues of the mixtape. Six singles supported the project across its three instalments, including the chart-topping songs "Without You" and "Stay", the latter being a collaboration with Justin Bieber. "Without You" became Laroi's first number-one single in Australia after releasing a remix with Miley Cyrus, while "Stay" was his first chart leader on the Billboard Hot 100. He later released the singles "Thousand Miles" and "Love Again", which were also commercially successful in Australia, Canada, and the United States, among other countries.

Laroi released his debut studio album, The First Time, on 10 November 2023. The album contains guest appearances from Jung Kook, Central Cee and Future. In Australia, The First Time debuted at number three on the ARIA Albums Chart, becoming Laroi's second top-three entry, following F*ck Love. It became his second top-40 album in the United Kingdom, entering the UK Albums Chart at number 29.

On 9 January 2026, Laroi released his second studio album, Before I Forget. The album debuted at number six on the Billboard 200 with 41,000 units sold first week, marking his second top-10 album on the chart.

== Studio albums ==
List of studio albums, with selected chart positions and certifications
Title	Album details	Peak chart positions									Certifications
Title	Album details	AUS	BEL (FL)	CAN	DEN	IRE	NZ	NOR	UK	US	Certifications
The First Time	Released: 10 November 2023; Label: Columbia; Formats: Digital download, LP, streaming	3	50	16	19	33	7	3	29	24	ARIA: Platinum; BPI: Silver; IFPI DEN: Gold; MC: Platinum; RIAA: Platinum; RMNZ: Platinum
Before I Forget	Released: 9 January 2026; Label: Columbia; Formats: CD, digital download, LP, streaming	2	20	11	13	34	9	19	22	6	

== Mixtapes ==
List of mixtapes, with selected chart positions and certifications
Title	Album details	Peak chart positions										Certifications
Title	Album details	AUS	BEL (FL)	CAN	DEN	IRE	NZ	NOR	SWE	UK	US	Certifications
F*ck Love	Released: 24 July 2020; Label: Grade A, Columbia; Formats: Digital download, LP, streaming	1	5	1	2	5	2	1	4	6	1	ARIA: 2× Platinum; BPI: Platinum; IFPI DEN: 2× Platinum; MC: 3× Platinum; RIAA: 3× Platinum; RMNZ: 4× Platinum

== Extended plays ==
List of extended plays
Title	EP details
14 with a Dream	Released: 16 August 2018 (Exclusive to SoundCloud and YouTube); Label: Self-released; Format: Digital download, streaming
Spotify Singles	Released: 24 March 2021 (Exclusive to Spotify); Label: Columbia; Format: Streaming

== Singles ==
=== As lead artist ===
List of singles as lead artist, with selected chart positions and certifications, showing year released and album name
Title	Year	Peak chart positions										Certifications	Album
Title	Year	AUS	BEL (FL)	CAN	DEN	IRE	NZ	NOR	SWE	UK	US	Certifications	Album
"Blessings"	2018	—	—	—	—	—	—	—	—	—	—		14 with a Dream
"Let Her Go"	2019	—	—	—	—	—	— (Note: "Let Her Go" did not chart on the NZ Top 40 Singles Chart, but did peak at number 23 on the NZ Hot Singles Chart.)	—	—	—	—	ARIA: Platinum; RIAA: Platinum; RMNZ: Gold	Non-album singles
"Diva" (featuring Lil Tecca)	2020	76	—	—	—	—	— (Note: "Diva" did not chart on the NZ Top 40 Singles Chart, but did peak at number six on the NZ Hot Singles Chart.)	—	—	—	—	ARIA: Gold; BPI: Silver; RIAA: Platinum; RMNZ: Platinum	Non-album singles
"Addison Rae"	2020	76	—	—	—	—	— (Note: "Addison Rae" did not chart on the NZ Top 40 Singles Chart, but did peak at number 13 on the NZ Hot Singles Chart.)	—	—	—	—	ARIA: Gold; RIAA: Gold	Non-album singles
"Fade Away" (with Lil Tjay)	2020	73	—	—	—	—	— (Note: "Fade Away" did not chart on the NZ Top 40 Singles Chart, but did peak at number five on the NZ Hot Singles Chart.)	—	—	—	—	RIAA: Gold	Non-album singles
"Go" (with Juice Wrld)	2020	23	—	40	—	42	32	—	—	43	52	ARIA: Platinum; BPI: Gold; IFPI DEN: Gold; MC: 2× Platinum; RIAA: 3× Platinum; RMNZ: Platinum	F*ck Love
"Tell Me Why"	2020	49	—	86	—	77	— (Note: "Tell Me Why" did not enter the NZ Top 40 Singles Chart, but peaked at number three on the NZ Hot Singles Chart.)	—	—	—	— (Note: "Tell Me Why" did not chart on the Billboard Hot 100, but did peak at number four on the Bubbling Under Hot 100 Singles chart.)	ARIA: Platinum; MC: Platinum; RIAA: Platinum; RMNZ: Gold	F*ck Love
"Need You Most (So Sick)"	2020	79	—	—	—	—	— (Note: "Need You Most (So Sick)" did not enter the NZ Top 40 Singles Chart, but peaked at number ten on the NZ Hot Singles Chart.)	—	—	—	—	ARIA: Platinum; MC: Gold; RIAA: Gold; RMNZ: Gold	F*ck Love
"Hell Bent" (with Tokyo's Revenge)	2020	—	—	—	—	—	— (Note: "Hell Bent" did not enter the NZ Top 40 Singles Chart, but peaked at number 29 on the NZ Hot Singles Chart.)	—	—	—	—		7ven
"So Done"	2020	6	— (Note: "So Done" did not enter the Ultratop 50, but peaked at number 15 on the Flemish Ultratip chart.)	24	29	23	17	4	38	38	59	ARIA: 4× Platinum; BPI: Gold; IFPI DEN: Gold; MC: 2× Platinum; RIAA: Platinum; RMNZ: 2× Platinum	F*ck Love (Savage)
"My City" (with Onefour)	2020	28	—	—	—	—	— (Note: "My City" did not enter the NZ Top 40 Singles Chart, but peaked at number six on the NZ Hot Singles Chart.)	—	—	—	—	ARIA: Platinum; RMNZ: Gold	Against All Odds
"Reminds Me of You" (with Juice Wrld)	2020	—	— (Note: "Reminds Me of You" did not enter the Ultratop 50, but peaked at number 15 on the Flemish Ultratip chart.)	56	—	48	— (Note: "Reminds Me of You" did not enter the NZ Top 40 Singles Chart, but peaked at number five on the NZ Hot Singles Chart.)	—	— (Note: "Reminds Me of You" did not enter the Swedish Singellista Chart, but peaked at number ten on the Swedish Heatseeker Chart.)	63	89	BPI: Silver; RMNZ: Gold	Non-album single
"Without You" (solo or with Miley Cyrus)	2020	1	1	7	2	3	8	1	5	2	8	ARIA: 8× Platinum; BPI: 2× Platinum; BRMA: Platinum; GLF: Platinum; IFPI DEN: 2× Platinum; IFPI NOR: 3× Platinum; MC: 6× Platinum; RIAA: 4× Platinum; RMNZ: 4× Platinum	F*ck Love (Savage)
"Stay" (with Justin Bieber)	2021	1	1	1	1	2	1	1	1	2	1	ARIA: 17× Platinum; BPI: 4× Platinum; BRMA: 2× Platinum; GLF: 5× Platinum; IFPI DEN: 4× Platinum; IFPI NOR: 2× Platinum; MC: Diamond; RIAA: 11× Platinum; RMNZ: 7× Platinum	F*ck Love 3: Over You
"Thousand Miles"	2022	4	—	11	19	19	6	13	14	21	15	ARIA: 2× Platinum; BPI: Silver; IFPI DEN: Gold; MC: 2× Platinum; RIAA: Platinum; RMNZ: Platinum	The First Time (deluxe)
"Paris to Tokyo" (with Fivio Foreign)	2022	26	—	53	—	98	— (Note: "Paris to Tokyo" did not enter the NZ Top 40 Singles Chart, but peaked at number two on the NZ Hot Singles Chart.)	—	—	—	— (Note: "Paris to Tokyo" did not enter the Billboard Hot 100, but peaked at number six on the Bubbling Under Hot 100 chart.)		B.I.B.L.E.
"Love Again"	2023	6	40	17	24	22	17	18	33	16	40	ARIA: Platinum; BPI: Silver; MC: Platinum; RIAA: Platinum; RMNZ: Gold	The First Time
"Kids Are Growing Up (Part 1)"	2023	—	—	—	—	—	— (Note: "Kids Are Growing Up (Part 1)" did not enter the NZ Top 40 Singles Chart, but peaked at number 19 on the NZ Hot Singles Chart.)	—	—	—	—		The First Time
"I Guess It's Love?"	2023	—	—	—	—	—	— (Note: "I Guess It's Love?" did not enter the NZ Top 40 Singles Chart, but peaked at number eight on the NZ Hot Singles Chart.)	—	—	—	—		Non-album single
"Where Does Your Spirit Go?"	2023	—	—	—	—	—	— (Note: "Where Does Your Spirit Go?" did not enter the NZ Top 40 Singles Chart, but peaked at number 13 on the NZ Hot Singles Chart.)	—	—	—	—		The First Time
"Too Much" (with Jungkook and Central Cee)	2023	10	—	32	—	19	37	37	60	10	44	MC: Gold; RIAA: Gold	The First Time
"What Just Happened"	2023	—	—	—	—	—	— (Note: "What Just Happened" did not enter the NZ Top 40 Singles Chart, but peaked at number seven on the NZ Hot Singles Chart.)	—	—	—	—		The First Time
"Bleed"	2023	47	—	86	—	65	— (Note: "Bleed" did not enter the NZ Top 40 Singles Chart, but peaked at number four on the NZ Hot Singles Chart.)	—	—	41	97	MC: Gold; RIAA: Gold; RMNZ: Gold	The First Time
"What's the Move?" (featuring Future and Baby Drill)	2023	—	—	—	—	—	— (Note: "What's the Move?" did not enter the NZ Top 40 Singles Chart, but peaked at number 13 on the NZ Hot Singles Chart.)	—	—	—	—		The First Time
"Heaven"	2024	—	—	—	—	—	— (Note: "Heaven" did not enter the NZ Top 40 Singles Chart, but peaked at number 12 on the NZ Hot Singles Chart.)	—	57	—	— (Note: "Heaven" did not chart on the Billboard Hot 100, but did peak at number 15 on the Bubbling Under Hot 100 Singles chart.)		The First Time (deluxe)
"Still Yours"	2024	—	—	—	—	—	— (Note: "Still Yours" did not enter the NZ Top 40 Singles Chart, but peaked at number 10 on the NZ Hot Singles Chart.)	—	—	—	—		Non-album single
"Girls" (solo or with Kehlani)	2024	18	—	24	—	54	26	27	51	47	51	ARIA: 3× Platinum; BPI: Silver; MC: Platinum; RIAA: Gold; RMNZ: Platinum	The First Time (deluxe)
"Baby I'm Back"	2024	37	—	64	—	76	28	37	— (Note: "Baby I'm Back" did not enter the Swedish Singellista Chart, but peaked at number 14 on the Swedish Heatseeker Chart.)	68	89	ARIA: Gold; MC: Gold; RIAA: Gold; RMNZ: Platinum	The First Time (deluxe)
"Aperol Spritz"	2024	—	—	—	—	—	— (Note: "Aperol Spritz" did not enter the NZ Top 40 Singles Chart, but peaked at number six on the NZ Hot Singles Chart.)	—	—	77	—		Non-album singles
"Slow It Down" (with Quavo)	2024	—	—	—	—	—	— (Note: "Slow It Down" did not enter the NZ Top 40 Singles Chart, but peaked at number 14 on the NZ Hot Singles Chart.)	—	—	—	—		Non-album singles
"All I Want Is You"	2025	—	—	—	—	—	— (Note: "All I Want Is You" did not enter the NZ Top 40 Singles Chart, but peaked at number 11 on the NZ Hot Singles Chart.)	—	—	—	—		Non-album singles
"How Does It Feel?"	2025	96	—	—	—	—	— (Note: "How Does It Feel?" did not enter the NZ Top 40 Singles Chart, but peaked at number 11 on the NZ Hot Singles Chart.)	—	—	—	—		Non-album singles
"Hot Girl Problems"	2025	—	—	—	—	—	— (Note: "Hot Girl Problems" did not enter the NZ Top 40 Singles Chart, but peaked at number 9 on the NZ Hot Singles Chart.)	—	—	—	—		Non-album singles
"She Don't Need to Know"	2025	— (Note: "She Don't Need to Know" did not enter the Australian top 100 Singles Chart, but peaked at number 7 on Australian Artist Chart.)	—	—	—	—	— (Note: "She Don't Need to Know" did not enter the NZ Top 40 Singles Chart, but peaked at number 7 on the NZ Hot Singles Chart.)	—	—	—	—		Non-album singles
"A Cold Play"	2025	53	—	81	—	—	— (Note: "A Cold Play" did not enter the NZ Top 40 Singles Chart, but peaked at number 5 on the NZ Hot Singles Chart.)	—	—	—	— (Note: "A Cold Play" did not enter the Billboard Hot 100, but peaked at number two on the Bubbling Under Hot 100 chart.)		Before I Forget
"A Perfect World"	2025	— (Note: "Back When You Were Mine" did not enter the ARIA top 100 Singles Chart, but peaked at number 4 on the Australian Artist Chart.)	—	—	—	—	— (Note: "A Perfect World" did not enter the NZ Top 40 Singles Chart, but peaked at number 17 on the NZ Hot Singles Chart.)	—	—	—	—		Before I Forget
"Back When You Were Mine"	2026	— (Note: "Back When You Were Mine" did not enter the ARIA top 100 Singles Chart, but peaked at number 18 on the Australian Artist Chart.)	—	—	—	—	— (Note: "Back When You Were Mine" did not enter the NZ Top 40 Singles Chart, but peaked at number 8 on the NZ Hot Singles Chart.)	—	—	—	—		Before I Forget
"Rather Be" (featuring Lithe)	2026	54	—	76	—	—	— (Note: "Rather Be" did not enter the NZ Top 40 Singles Chart, but peaked at number 4 on the NZ Hot Singles Chart.)	—	—	78	77		Before I Forget
"I Condemn"	2026	— (Note: "I Condemn" did not enter the ARIA top 100 Singles Chart, but peaked at number 4 on the Australian Artist Chart.)	—	—	—	—	— (Note: "I Condemn" did not enter the NZ Top 40 Singles Chart, but peaked at number 4 on the NZ Hot Singles Chart.)	—	—	—	—		Before I Forget (Deluxe)
"Pieces"	2026	— (Note: "Pieces" did not enter the ARIA top 100 Singles Chart, but peaked at number 10 on the Australian Artist Chart.)	—	—	—	—	— (Note: "Pieces" did not enter the NZ Top 40 Singles Chart, but peaked at number 16 on the NZ Hot 40 Singles Chart.)	—	—	—	—		Before I Forget (Deluxe)
"Sleep"	2026	— (Note: "Sleep" did not enter the ARIA top 100 Singles Chart, but peaked at number 4 on the Australian Artist Chart.)	—	—	—	—	— (Note: "Sleep" did not enter the NZ Top 40 Singles Chart, but peaked at number 6 on the NZ Hot 40 Singles Chart.)	—	—	—	—		Non-album singles
"Get Even" (with Giveon)	2026	— (Note: "Get Even" did not enter the ARIA top 100 Singles Chart, but peaked at number 8 on the Australian Artist Chart.)	—	—	—	—	— (Note: "Get Even" did not enter the NZ Top 40 Singles Chart, but peaked at number 10 on the NZ Hot Singles Chart.)	—	—	—	—		Non-album singles
"Face Card" (with Nate Sib)	2026	—	—	—	—	—	— (Note: "Face Card" did not enter the NZ Top 40 Singles Chart, but peaked at number 29 on the NZ Hot Singles Chart.)	—	—	—	—		Non-album singles
"A Place to Go"	2026	—	—	—	—	—	—	—	—	—	—		
"—" denotes a recording that did not chart or was not released in that territory.

=== As featured artist ===
List of singles as featured artist, with selected chart positions, showing year released and album name
Title	Year	Peak chart position			Album
Title	Year	CAN	NZ Hot	US	Album
"Costa Rica (Remix)" (Bankrol Hayden featuring the Kid Laroi)	2020	—	40	—	Pain Is Temporary
"Go Dumb" (Y2K featuring Blackbear, the Kid Laroi, and Bankrol Hayden)	2020	—	29	—	Non-album single
"Distant Strangers" (Onefour featuring the Kid Laroi and Imogen Heap)	2025	—	—	—	Look at Me Now
"Lost" (Bailey Zimmerman featuring the Kid Laroi)	2025	60	13	86	Different Night Same Rodeo
"—" denotes a recording that did not chart or was not released in that territory.

=== Promotional singles ===
List of promotional singles, with selected chart positions, showing year released and album name
Title	Year	Peak chart positions		Album
Title	Year	NZ Hot	SWE	Album
"I Can't Go Back to the Way It Was (Intro)"	2023	9	84	Non-album single

== Other charted and certified songs ==
List of songs, with selected chart positions and certifications, showing year released and album name
Title	Year	Peak chart positions									Certifications	Album
Title	Year	AUS	CAN	DEN	IRE	NZ	NOR	SWE	UK	US	Certifications	Album
"Hate the Other Side" (Juice Wrld and Marshmello featuring Polo G and the Kid Laroi)	2020	15	12	—	—	27	—	54	— (Note: "Hate the Other Side" did not enter the UK Singles Chart, but peaked at number 25 on the UK Streaming Top 100.)	10	BPI: Gold; RIAA: Platinum; RMNZ: Platinum	Legends Never Die
"Maybe"	2020	84	—	—	—	— (Note: "Maybe" did not enter the NZ Top 40 Singles Chart, but peaked at number 13 on the NZ Hot Singles Chart.)	—	—	—	—	ARIA: Gold; MC: Gold; RIAA: Gold	F*ck Love
"Wrong" (featuring Lil Mosey)	2020	54	98	—	90	— (Note: "Wrong" did not enter the NZ Top 40 Singles Chart, but peaked at number six on the NZ Hot Singles Chart.)	—	—	—	— (Note: "Wrong" did not chart on the Billboard Hot 100, but did peak at number nine on the Bubbling Under Hot 100 Singles chart.)	ARIA: Platinum; MC: Platinum; RIAA: Platinum; RMNZ: Gold	F*ck Love
"I Wish"	2020	—	—	—	—	—	—	—	—	—	ARIA: Gold; RIAA: Gold	F*ck Love
"Not Fair" (featuring Corbin)	2020	92	—	—	—	— (Note: "Not Fair" did not enter the NZ Top 40 Singles Chart, but peaked at number 12 on the NZ Hot Singles Chart.)	—	—	—	—	ARIA: Gold; MC: Gold; RIAA: Gold	F*ck Love
"Erase U"	2020	—	—	—	—	—	—	—	—	—	ARIA: Gold	F*ck Love
"Selfish"	2020	—	—	—	—	—	—	—	—	—	ARIA: Gold; MC: Gold; RIAA: Gold	F*ck Love
"Speak" (with Internet Money)	2020	—	—	—	—	— (Note: "Speak" did not enter the NZ Top 40 Singles Chart, but peaked at number 16 on the NZ Hot Singles Chart.)	—	—	—	—		B4 the Storm
"Pikachu"	2020	81	—	—	—	—	—	—	—	— (Note: "Pikachu" did not chart on the Billboard Hot 100, but peaked at number 22 on the Bubbling Under Hot 100 Singles chart.)	ARIA: Gold	F*ck Love (Savage)
"Tragic" (featuring YoungBoy Never Broke Again and Internet Money)	2020	41	59	—	—	— (Note: "Tragic" did not enter the NZ Top 40 Singles Chart, but peaked at number two on the NZ Hot Singles Chart.)	—	—	—	76	ARIA: Gold; MC: Platinum; RIAA: Platinum; RMNZ: Gold	F*ck Love (Savage)
"Always Do"	2020	34	48	—	39	— (Note: "Always Do" did not enter the NZ Top 40 Singles Chart, but peaked at number one on the NZ Hot Singles Chart.)	—	—	66	83	ARIA: Platinum; BPI: Silver; MC: Platinum; RIAA: Platinum; RMNZ: Gold	F*ck Love (Savage)
"Feel Something" (with Marshmello)	2020	78	93	—	—	—	—	—	—	— (Note: "Feel Something" did not chart on the Billboard Hot 100, but peaked at number 13 on the Bubbling Under Hot 100 Singles chart.)	MC: Gold; RIAA: Gold	F*ck Love (Savage)
"F*ck You, Goodbye" (featuring Machine Gun Kelly)	2020	54	64	—	—	— (Note: "F*ck You, Goodbye" did not enter the NZ Top 40 Singles Chart, but peaked at number six on the NZ Hot Singles Chart.)	—	—	—	99	ARIA: Gold; BPI: Silver; MC: Platinum; RIAA: Platinum; RMNZ: Gold	F*ck Love (Savage)
"Unstable" (Justin Bieber featuring the Kid Laroi)	2021	22	17	12	—	— (Note: "Unstable" did not enter the NZ Top 40 Singles Chart, but peaked at number four on the NZ Hot Singles Chart.)	33	53	—	62	ARIA: Gold; RIAA: Gold	Justice
"Shot for Me"	2021	—	—	—	—	— (Note: "Shot for Me" did not enter the NZ Top 40 Singles Chart, but peaked at number 26 on the NZ Hot Singles Chart.)	—	—	—	—		Spotify Singles
"No Return" (Polo G featuring the Kid Laroi and Lil Durk)	2021	33	26	—	40	— (Note: "No Return" did not enter the NZ Top 40 Singles Chart, but peaked at number three on the NZ Hot Singles Chart.)	—	—	47	26	MC: Gold; RIAA: Platinum	Hall of Fame
"Over You"	2021	44	81	—	—	—	—	—	—	— (Note: "Over You" did not chart on the Billboard Hot 100, but did peak at number eight on the Bubbling Under Hot 100 Singles chart.)		F*ck Love 3: Over You
"Not Sober" (featuring Polo G and Stunna Gambino)	2021	8	22	23	43	21	28	55	42	41	MC: Gold; RIAA: Gold; RMNZ: Gold	F*ck Love 3: Over You
"Same Energy"	2021	51	86	—	—	— (Note: "Same Energy" did not enter the NZ Top 40 Singles Chart, but peaked at number seven on the NZ Hot Singles Chart.)	—	—	—	— (Note: "Same Energy" did not chart on the Billboard Hot 100, but did peak at number 10 on the Bubbling Under Hot 100 Singles chart.)		F*ck Love 3: Over You
"Bad News"	2021	82	—	—	—	—	—	—	—	—		F*ck Love 3: Over You
"Still Chose You" (featuring Mustard)	2021	26	65	—	—	— (Note: "Still Chose You" did not enter the NZ Top 40 Singles Chart, but peaked at number five on the NZ Hot Singles Chart.)	—	—	80	100		F*ck Love 3: Over You
"Wasting Angels" (Post Malone featuring the Kid Laroi)	2022	30	30	—	—	— (Note: "Wasting Angels" did not enter the NZ Top 40 Singles Chart, but peaked at number three on the NZ Hot Singles Chart.)	—	89	—	56		Twelve Carat Toothache
"Burning Up" (Nardo Wick featuring the Kid Laroi)	2022	—	—	—	—	— (Note: "Burning Up" did not enter the NZ Top 40 Singles Chart, but peaked at number 32 on the NZ Hot Singles Chart.)	—	—	—	—		Who Is Nardo Wick?? (Deluxe)
"2 Grown" (Lil Tjay featuring the Kid Laroi)	2023	—	—	—	—	— (Note: "2 Grown" did not enter the NZ Top 40 Singles Chart, but peaked at number 22 on the NZ Hot Singles Chart.)	—	—	—	—		222
"Forever & Again"	2023	—	—	—	—	—	—	— (Note: "Forever & Again" did not enter the Swedish Singellista Chart, but peaked at number five on the Swedish Heatseeker Chart.)	92	—		Barbie the Album
"Wind" (Trippie Redd featuring the Kid Laroi)	2023	—	—	—	—	— (Note: "Wind" did not enter the NZ Top 40 Singles Chart, but peaked at number 26 on the NZ Hot Singles Chart.)	—	—	—	—		A Love Letter to You 5
"Sorry"	2023	—	—	—	—	— (Note: "Sorry" did not enter the NZ Top 40 Singles Chart, but peaked at number 10 on the NZ Hot Singles Chart.)	—	—	—	—		The First Time
"I Thought That I Needed You"	2023	—	—	—	—	— (Note: "I Thought That I Needed You" did not enter the NZ Top 40 Singles Chart, but peaked at number 16 on the NZ Hot Singles Chart.)	—	—	—	—		The First Time
"Where Do You Sleep?"	2023	—	—	—	—	— (Note: "Where Do You Sleep?" did not enter the NZ Top 40 Singles Chart, but peaked at number 23 on the NZ Hot Singles Chart.)	—	—	—	—		The First Time
"Nights Like This"	2023	20	43	—	27	16	34	78	28	47	ARIA: 2× Platinum; BPI: Platinum; IFPI DEN: Gold; MC: Platinum; RIAA: 3× Platinum; RMNZ: 2× Platinum	The First Time
"This My Life" (with Lyrical Lemonade, Lil Tecca and Lil Skies)	2024	—	—	—	—	— (Note: "This My Life" did not enter the NZ Top 40 Singles Chart, but peaked at number 20 on the NZ Hot Singles Chart.)	—	—	—	— (Note: "This My Life" did not chart on the Billboard Hot 100, but did peak at number 19 on the Bubbling Under Hot 100 Singles chart.)		All Is Yellow
"Stick with Me"	2024	—	—	—	—	— (Note: "Stick with Me" did not enter the NZ Top 40 Singles Chart, but peaked at number 33 on the NZ Hot Singles Chart.)	—	—	—	—		The First Time (deluxe)
"Pick Sides"	2024	—	—	—	—	— (Note: "Pick Sides" did not enter the NZ Top 40 Singles Chart, but peaked at number 30 on the NZ Hot Singles Chart.)	—	—	—	—		The First Time (deluxe)
"Nights Like This Pt 2"	2024	—	—	—	—	— (Note: "Nights Like This Pt 2" did not enter the NZ Top 40 Singles Chart, but peaked at number seven on the NZ Hot Singles Chart.)	—	—	—	—		The First Time (deluxe)
"Hatred" (featuring Lil Yachty)	2024	—	—	—	—	— (Note: "Hatred" did not enter the NZ Top 40 Singles Chart, but peaked at number 39 on the NZ Hot Singles Chart.)	—	—	—	—		The First Time (deluxe)
"Goodbye"	2024	—	—	—	—	— (Note: "Goodbye" did not enter the NZ Top 40 Singles Chart, but peaked at number eight on the NZ Hot Singles Chart.)	—	—	—	— (Note: "Goodbye" did not chart on the Billboard Hot 100, but did peak at number three on the Bubbling Under Hot 100 Singles chart.)		The Party Never Ends
"I Know Love" (Tate McRae featuring the Kid Laroi)	2025	17	24	39	44	24	17	71	25	43	MC: Platinum; RIAA: Gold; RMNZ: Gold	So Close to What
"July"	2026	—	—	—	—	— (Note: "July" did not enter the NZ Top 40 Singles Chart, but peaked at number 12 on the NZ Hot Singles Chart.)	—	—	—	—		Before I Forget
"Private"	2026	—	—	—	—	— (Note: "Private" did not enter the NZ Top 40 Singles Chart, but peaked at number 9 on the NZ Hot Singles Chart.)	—	—	—	—		Before I Forget
"Hold Still"	2026	—	—	—	—	— (Note: "Hold Still" did not enter the NZ Top 40 Singles Chart, but peaked at number 27 on the NZ Hot Singles Chart.)	—	—	—	—		Before I Forget (Deluxe)
"Move Your Body"	2026	—	—	—	—	— (Note: "Move Your Body" did not enter the NZ Top 40 Singles Chart, but peaked at number 39 on the NZ Hot Singles Chart.)	—	—	—	—		Before I Forget (Deluxe)
"—" denotes a recording that did not chart or was not released in that territory.

== Guest appearances ==
List of guest appearances, with other performing artists, showing year released and album name
Title	Year	Other artist(s)	Album
"Hate the Other Side"	2020	Juice Wrld, Polo G	Legends Never Die
"Speak"	2020	Internet Money	B4 the Storm
"Unstable"	2021	Justin Bieber	Justice
"No Return"	2021	Polo G, Lil Durk	Hall of Fame
"You Can't"	2021	G Herbo, Gunna	25
"Wasting Angels"	2022	Post Malone	Twelve Carat Toothache
"Burning Up"	2022	Nardo Wick	Who Is Nardo Wick?? (Deluxe)
"What You Say"	2023	YoungBoy Never Broke Again, Post Malone	Don't Try This at Home
"2 Grown"	2023	Lil Tjay	222
"Forever & Again"	2023	none	Barbie the Album
"Wind"	2023	Trippie Redd	A Love Letter to You 5
"Alright"	2024	Ekkstacy	Ekkstacy
"This My Life"	2024	Lyrical Lemonade, Lil Skies, Lil Tecca	All Is Yellow
"Rain Fallin"	2024	Polo G	Hood Poet
"Goodbye"	2024	none	The Party Never Ends
"I Know Love"	2025	Tate McRae	So Close to What
"Open Up"	2026	Taeyang	Quintessence
"Bluffin'"	2026	Joji	Piss in the Wind

== Music videos ==
List of music videos, showing year released and directors
Title	Year	Director	Ref.
As lead artist
"Let Her Go"	2019	Cole Bennett	
"Diva" (featuring Lil Tecca)	2020	Cole Bennett	
"Go" (with Juice Wrld)	2020	Steve Cannon	
"Tell Me Why"	2020	Cole Bennett	
"Not Fair" (featuring Corbin)	2020	Alex Howard	
"I Wish"	2020	Josh Jones	
"Selfish"	2020	Steve Cannon	
"Wrong" (featuring Lil Mosey)	2020	Logan Paul	
"So Done"	2020	Cole Bennett	
"Hell Bent" (with Tokyo's Revenge)	2020	Miles & AJ	
"Always Do"	2020	Steve Cannon	
"Maybe"	2020	Josh Jones	
"Without You"	2020	Steve Cannon	
"Tragic" (featuring YoungBoy Never Broke Again and Internet Money)	2020	Steve Cannon	
"Without You" (with Miley Cyrus)	2021	Miley Cyrus	
"Stay" (with Justin Bieber)	2021	Colin Tilley	
"Not Sober" (featuring Polo G and Stunna Gambino)	2021	Steve Cannon	
"Still Chose You" (featuring Mustard)	2021	Arrad	
"Thousand Miles"	2022	Christian Breslauer	
"Paris to Tokyo" (with Fivio Foreign)	2022	Chris Villa	
"I Can't Go Back to the Way It Was (Intro)"	2023	Julian Klincewicz	
"Love Again"	2023	Adrian Villagomez	
"Kids Are Growing Up (Part 1)"	2023	Ramez Silyan	
"I Guess It's Love?"	2023	Helmi	
"Too Much" (with Jungkook and Central Cee)	2023	Ramez Silyan	
"What Just Happened"	2023	Ramez Silyan	
"Bleed"	2023	Ramez Silyan	
"Sorry"	2023	Cole Bennett	
"This My Life" (with Lyrical Lemonade, Lil Tecca and Lil Skies)	2024	Cole Bennett	
"Girls"	2024	Bradley Calder	
"Baby I'm Back"	2024	Adam Kargenian	
"Aperol Spritz"	2024	Alex Lill	
"How Does It Feel?"	2025	Calmatic	
"Hot Girl Problems"	2025	Nick Vernet	
"She Don't Need to Know"	2025	Danica Arias Kleinknecht	
"A Cold Play"	2025	Alex Lill	
"I Condemn"	2026	Alex Lill	
"Pieces"	2026	Alex Lill	
"Sleep"	2026	Ayodeji	
As a featured artist
"No Return" (Polo G featuring the Kid Laroi and Lil Durk)	2021	Mooch	
"Burning Up" (Nardo Wick featuring the Kid Laroi)	2022	Cole Bennett	
"What You Say" (YoungBoy Never Broke Again featuring Post Malone and the Kid Laroi)	2023	Isaac Garcia	
"2 Grown" (Lil Tjay featuring the Kid Laroi)	2023	Jb Tai	
"I Know Love" (Tate McRae featuring the Kid Laroi)	2025	—	
"Lost" (Bailey Zimmerman featuring the Kid Laroi)	2025	—	
Guest appearance
"Blueberry Faygo" (Lil Mosey)	2020	Cole Bennett	
