= The First Time Tour =

2024 concert tour by The Kid Laroi

- Tour by The Kid Laroi
- Associated album: The First Time
- Start date: April 4, 2024
- End date: November 30, 2024
- Legs: 3
- No. of shows: 52

The First Time Tour was the debut headlining concert tour by Australian rapper and singer The Kid Laroi, launched in support of his debut studio album The First Time (2023) which has been certified platinum by the RIAA. The tour visited North America, Europe, Oceania, and the United Kingdom. It marked Laroi's first major headlining world tour following the release of his debut studio album.

== Background ==
On January 26, 2024, Laroi announced the European and United Kingdom leg of the tour, scheduled to begin in February 2024. Following the announcement, additional North American dates were revealed, beginning on May 18, 2024, in Vancouver, Canada.

The tour was named for Laroi's debut studio album The First Time, which was released in November 2023. The album was highly anticipated by fans and included several commercially successful singles and marked a major milestone in his career.

In November 2023, the Oceania leg was postponed prior to its start due to logistical and scheduling issues, with organizers confirming that replacement dates would be announced. The rescheduled Oceania dates were later announced for November 2024, including arena and stadium performances across Australia.

During the North American leg, several concerts were postponed and rescheduled due to illness and logistical complications. A number of affected shows, including performances in Irving, Oklahoma City, and Houston, were moved to later dates in September 2024. Despite these changes, the tour ultimately visited cities across Europe, North America, and Oceania.

During the tour, Laroi played the then-unreleased song "Girls" for the first time, which would later become a popular hit after release, charting in several dozen countries and peaking at the 62nd spot on the Billboard Global chart.

== Set list ==
This set list is representative of the performance in Vancouver on May 18, 2024. It does not represent all shows.

1. "SORRY"
2. "WHAT'S THE MOVE?"
3. "Diva"
4. "TRAGIC"
5. "Deserve You"
6. "WHERE DO YOU SLEEP?"
7. "Girls"
8. "GO"
9. "NIGHTS LIKE THIS"
10. "BLEED"
11. "HEAVEN"
12. "Selfish"
13. "Tear Me Apart"
14. "Love Again"
15. "Where Does Your Spirit Go?"
16. "Without You"
17. "I THOUGHT THAT I NEEDED YOU"
18. "Thousand Miles"
19. "NOT FAIR"
20. "Always Do"
21. "What Just Happened"
22. "WHAT WENT WRONG???"
23. "Stay"
- The show was divided into four acts and an encore, reflecting the thematic structure of The First Time.

== Shows ==
List of concerts, showing date, city, country, venue, opening act, attendance and amount of gross revenue
Date	City	Country	Venue	Opening act	Attendance	Revenue
Europe and United Kingdom
April 4, 2024	Stockholm	Sweden	Annexet	Sam Tompkins	—N/a	—N/a
April 5, 2024	Oslo	Norway	Sentrum Scene	Sam Tompkins	—N/a	—N/a
April 7, 2024	Frederiksberg	Denmark	Forum Copenhagen	Sam Tompkins	—N/a	—N/a
April 9, 2024	Warsaw	Poland	Torwar	Sam Tompkins	—N/a	—N/a
April 11, 2024	Amsterdam	Netherlands	AFAS Live	Sam Tompkins	—N/a	—N/a
April 14, 2024	Dublin	Ireland	3Arena	Sam Tompkins	—N/a	—N/a
April 16, 2024	London	United Kingdom	Alexandra Palace	Sam Tompkins	—N/a	—N/a
April 17, 2024	Manchester	United Kingdom	O2 Apollo Manchester	Sam Tompkins	—N/a	—N/a
April 22, 2024	Berlin	Germany	Uber Eats Music Hall	Sam Tompkins	—N/a	—N/a
April 24, 2024	Düsseldorf	Germany	Mitsubishi Electric Halle	Sam Tompkins	—N/a	—N/a
April 25, 2024	Paris	France	Adidas Arena	Sam Tompkins	—N/a	—N/a
April 27, 2024	Milan	Italy	Fabrique	Sam Tompkins	—N/a	—N/a
North America
May 18, 2024	Vancouver	Canada	Doug Mitchell Thunderbird Sports Centre	glaive Chase Shakur	—N/a	—N/a
May 22, 2024	Seattle	United States	Showbox SoDo	glaive Chase Shakur	—N/a	—N/a
May 25, 2024 (Note: This concert was part of BottleRock Napa Valley.)	Napa	United States	Napa Valley Expo	glaive Chase Shakur	—N/a	—N/a
May 26, 2024	San Diego	United States	SOMA	glaive Chase Shakur	—N/a	—N/a
May 28, 2024 (Note: Rescheduled due to illness.)	Los Angeles	United States	The Torch at LA Coliseum	glaive Chase Shakur	—N/a	—N/a
May 29, 2024 (Note: Rescheduled due to illness.)	Phoenix	United States	Arizona Financial Theatre	glaive Chase Shakur	—N/a	—N/a
May 31, 2024 (Note: Rescheduled due to illness.)	Denver	United States	Fillmore Auditorium	glaive Chase Shakur	—N/a	—N/a
June 7, 2024	Atlanta	United States	Coca-Cola Roxy	glaive Chase Shakur	—N/a	—N/a
June 9, 2024	Tampa	United States	Yuengling Center	glaive Chase Shakur	—N/a	—N/a
June 11, 2024	Miami	United States	Fillmore Miami Beach	glaive Chase Shakur	—N/a	—N/a
June 13, 2024	Charlotte	United States	Skyla Credit Union Amphitheatre	glaive Chase Shakur	—N/a	—N/a
June 15, 2024	Washington, D.C.	United States	The Anthem	glaive Chase Shakur	—N/a	—N/a
June 16, 2024	Boston	United States	MGM Music Hall at Fenway	glaive Chase Shakur	—N/a	—N/a
June 17, 2024	New York City	United States	Radio City Music Hall	glaive Chase Shakur	—N/a	—N/a
June 20, 2024	Philadelphia	United States	The Met Philadelphia	glaive Chase Shakur	—N/a	—N/a
June 22, 2024	Laval	Canada	Place Bell	glaive Chase Shakur	—N/a	—N/a
June 23, 2024	Toronto	Canada	History	glaive Chase Shakur	—N/a	—N/a
June 25, 2024	Chicago	United States	Byline Bank Aragon Ballroom	glaive Chase Shakur	—N/a	—N/a
June 26, 2024	Nashville	United States	Nashville Municipal Auditorium	glaive Chase Shakur	—N/a	—N/a
June 28, 2024	Cincinnati	United States	Andrew J Brady Music Center	glaive Chase Shakur	—N/a	—N/a
July 1, 2024	Pittsburgh	United States	Stage AE	glaive Chase Shakur	—N/a	—N/a
July 2, 2024	Indianapolis	United States	Everwise Amphitheater	glaive Chase Shakur	—N/a	—N/a
July 3, 2024	Detroit	United States	Fillmore Detroit	glaive Chase Shakur	—N/a	—N/a
July 5, 2024	Minneapolis	United States	Armory	glaive Chase Shakur	—N/a	—N/a
July 6, 2024	Milwaukee	United States	Eagles Ballroom	glaive Chase Shakur	—N/a	—N/a
July 7, 2024	Waukee	United States	Vibrant Music Hall	glaive Chase Shakur	—N/a	—N/a
July 9, 2024	St. Louis	United States	The Factory	glaive Chase Shakur	—N/a	—N/a
July 10, 2024	Omaha	United States	Steelhouse Omaha	glaive Chase Shakur	—N/a	—N/a
September 4, 2024 (Note: Rescheduled from June and July 2024 dates.)	Irving	United States	Pavilion at Toyota Music Factory	—N/a	—N/a	—N/a
September 6, 2024 (Note: Rescheduled from July 2024.)	Oklahoma City	United States	The Criterion	—N/a	—N/a	—N/a
September 8, 2024 (Note: Rescheduled and moved from 713 Music Hall.)	Houston	United States	Bayou Music Center	—N/a	—N/a	—N/a
Oceania (rescheduled November 2024)
November 11, 2024	Gold Coast	Australia	Home of the Arts	—N/a	—N/a	—N/a
November 14, 2024	Brisbane	Australia	Brisbane Entertainment Centre	Quavo; ONEFOUR	—N/a	—N/a
November 16, 2024	Sydney	Australia	CommBank Stadium	Quavo; ONEFOUR	—N/a	—N/a
November 20, 2024	Perth	Australia	RAC Arena	Quavo; ONEFOUR	—N/a	—N/a
November 24, 2024	Adelaide	Australia	Adelaide Entertainment Centre	Quavo; ONEFOUR	—N/a	—N/a
November 27, 2024	Hobart	Australia	MyState Bank Arena	—N/a	—N/a	—N/a
November 29, 2024	Melbourne	Australia	Rod Laver Arena	Quavo; ONEFOUR	—N/a	—N/a
November 30, 2024	Melbourne	Australia	Rod Laver Arena	Quavo; ONEFOUR	—N/a	—N/a

== Personnel ==
- The Kid Laroi – vocals
