= All I Want Is You =

All I Want Is You may refer to:

== Albums ==
- All I Want Is You (album), by Miguel, or the title song (see below), 2010
- All I Want Is You, by Darrell Evans, 2002

== Songs ==
- "All I Want Is You" (911 song), 1998
- "All I Want Is You" (Agnes song), 2012
- "All I Want Is You" (Carly Simon song), 1987
- "All I Want Is You" (Miguel song), 2010
- "All I Want Is You" (Roxy Music song), 1974
- "All I Want Is You" (U2 song), 1989; covered by Bellefire, 2002
- "Come on Over Baby (All I Want Is You)", by Christina Aguilera, 2000
- "Dig a Pony" or "All I Want Is You", by the Beatles, 1970
- "All I Want Is You", by Ball Park Music from Happiness and Surrounding Suburbs, 2011
- "All I Want Is You", by Barry Louis Polisar, 1977; featured in the opening credits of the 2007 film Juno
- "All I Want Is You", by Brooke Hogan from The Redemption, 2009
- "All I Want Is You", by Bryan Adams from Waking Up the Neighbours, 1991
- "All I Want Is You", by Damien Leith from Where We Land, 2007
- "All I Want Is You", by Emerson, Lake & Palmer from Love Beach, 1978
- "All I Want Is You", by the Escorts, 1964
- "All I Want Is You", by Idle Flowers, led by René Berg, 1984
- "All I Want Is You", by Justin Bieber from Under the Mistletoe, 2011
- "All I Want Is You", by The Kid Laroi, 2025
- "All I Want Is You", by M-Flo from Square One, 2012
- "All I Want Is You", by Rockmelons from Rockies 3, 2002
- "All I Want Is You", by Take That from Everything Changes, 1993
- "All I Want Is You", by Whitesnake from Live... in the Shadow of the Blues, 2006

== Other media ==
- All I Want Is You, a novel by Martina Reilly
- "All I Want Is You" (Instant Star), a 2007 TV episode

== See also ==
- All I Want Is You... and You... and You..., a 1974 British comedy film
- "You Might Think", a 1984 song by the Cars that features this phrase
