= Baby I'm Back (The Kid Laroi song) =

- Remix cover

Single by the Kid Laroi (solo or with Gunna)

from the album The First Time (Deluxe Version)
- Released: 27 September 2024
- Genre: Hip hop
- Length: 2:51 (album); 3:50 (remix)
- Label: Columbia
- Songwriters: Charlton Howard; Antonio Zito; J. C. Crowley; Peter Beckett; Rogét Chahayed; Sergio Giavanni Kitchens (remix only)
- Producers: Dopamine; Rogét Chahayed

The Kid Laroi singles chronology
"Girls" (2024)	"Baby I'm Back" (2024)	"Aperol Spritz" (2024)

Gunna singles chronology
"Champs Elysées" (2024)	"Baby I'm Back" (remix) (2024)	"Him All Along" (2024)

Music video
- "Baby I'm Back" on YouTube

"Baby I'm Back" is a song by Australian rapper and singer the Kid Laroi. It was sent to Italian radio stations on 27 September 2024 as the third single from the deluxe edition of his debut studio album, The First Time (2023). A remix of the song with American rapper Gunna was released through Columbia Records the same day. Written by Laroi and co-producers Antonio "Dopamine" Zito and Rogét Chahayed, the track samples "Baby Come Back" by Player, with band members J. C. Crowley and Peter Beckett additionally receiving songwriting credits.

At the 2025 ARIA Music Awards, the song was nominated for Best Hip Hop/Rap Release.

== Composition and lyrics ==
"Baby I'm Back" begins with a sample from "Baby Come Back" that leads into Laroi reminiscing about how hectic his past year has been. He reflects on his ever-growing star power and love life while touching on the unpleasant side of fame. Laroi mentions having "friends who just pretend and say they love everything" and promises his new relationship is "too rеal for [him] to care what [others] think". The remix remains mostly the same structurally and instrumentally, outside of Gunna now handling the second verse and Laroi providing the third.

== Commercial performance ==
"Baby I'm Back" entered the US Bubbling Under Hot 100 chart at number 24, rising to number 10 in its second week. The song debuted on the Billboard Hot 100 a week later at number 95. Following the release of the remix, "Baby I'm Back" re-entered the Hot 100, peaking at number 89. It also achieved new peaks in Australia, Canada and New Zealand, reaching numbers 37, 64 and 28, respectively. The song was certified gold by the Australian Recording Industry Association (ARIA), Music Canada, and the Recording Industry Association of America (RIAA), and platinum by Recorded Music NZ (RMNZ).

== Charts ==
Chart performance for "Baby I'm Back"
Chart (2024)	Peak position
Australia (ARIA)	37
Australia Hip Hop/R&B (ARIA)	4
Canada Hot 100 (Billboard)	64
Global 200 (Billboard)	104
Ireland (IRMA)	76
New Zealand (Recorded Music NZ)	28
Norway (VG-lista)	37
Portugal (AFP)	160
Singapore (RIAS)	20
Sweden Heatseeker (Sverigetopplistan)	14
UK Singles (Official Charts)	68
UK Hip Hop/R&B (Official Charts)	18
US Billboard Hot 100	89

Chart performance for "Baby I'm Back" (remix)
Chart (2024)	Peak position
Netherlands (Single Tip)	7
Switzerland (Schweizer Hitparade)	94

== Certifications ==
Certifications for "Baby I'm Back"
Region	Certification	Certified units/sales
Australia (ARIA)	Gold	35,000^{‡}
Canada (Music Canada)	Gold	40,000^{‡}
New Zealand (RMNZ)	Platinum	30,000^{‡}
United States (RIAA)	Gold	500,000^{‡}
^{‡} Sales+streaming figures based on certification alone.

== Release history ==
Release dates and formats for "Baby I'm Back"
Region	Date	Format(s)	Version	Label	Ref.
Italy	27 September 2024	Radio airplay	Original	Sony	
Various	27 September 2024	Digital download; streaming	Remix	Columbia	
