= Big Drip =

2019 single by Fivio Foreign

Single by Fivio Foreign

from the EP Pain and Love and 800 B.C.
- Released: June 5, 2019
- Genre: Brooklyn drill
- Length: 2:48
- Label: RichFish; Columbia; ForeignSide
- Songwriter(s): Maxie Ryles III; Manalla Yusuf
- Producer(s): Axl

Fivio Foreign singles chronology
"Big Drip" (2019)	"Cool Em Off" (2019)

Music video
- "Big Drip" on YouTube

"Big Drip" is the debut single by American rapper Fivio Foreign, released on June 5, 2019. Produced by Axl, it is his breakout hit and appears on his EPs Pain and Love (2019) and 800 B.C. (2020). An official remix of the song featuring American rappers Lil Baby and Quavo was released on March 13, 2020.

== Background ==
Fivio Foreign said in an interview with Genius, "The day I made this song, it's crazy because I keep trying to make the same exact everything. It was homies. It was liquor. I think it was bitches there and there was drugs there. It was a movie and then we went viral." According to him, "When I really first finished that song, it ain’t feel that crazy. I felt way crazy about other songs, way crazier, but I don't know. I did four songs and I didn't know which one was a hit. So, I just put them all out, four songs together and everybody liked the 'Big Drip.'"

When Fivio Foreign heard the song on radio, he began promoting it through having it played in strip clubs. The success of the song led to Foreign signing to Columbia Records.

== Composition ==
The production of the song contains mostly stuttering hi-hats, while Fivio Foreign performs in a highly energetic manner and uses ad-libs throughout the song.

== Critical reception ==
Alphonse Pierre of Pitchfork wrote, "Compared to the ahead-of-the-beat deliveries often wielded in Brooklyn's rap scene, Fivio drags out every line, saying more in his ad-libs than his actual verses. Though he's patient, his music is still high-energy"; he further commented the music video "adds to the chaos." Fred Thomas of AllMusic called it a "minimal but explosive display of relentless energy and aggression."

== Music video ==
The music video was released on August 28, 2019. It shows Fivio Foreign and his crew having a block party in the Brooklyn Bridge Park, including shots of Super Soakers, Hennessy, and an ice cream truck, as well as tourists walking by and staring in bewilderment.

== Remix ==
An official remix of the song was released on March 13, 2020. It features American rappers Lil Baby and Quavo, who rap about their enemies, drugs, and sports cars.

The remix received mostly positive reviews from critics. Mitch Findlay of HotNewHipHop wrote, "none of the contributing emcees seem particularly interested in dense metaphors or carefully constructed schemes. Instead, they take to AXL Beats' production with a hungry intensity, all the more refreshing given Quavo's recent string of phoned-in appearances. It's nice to hear the Quality Control squad trying a different style on this one, and their co-sign of Fivio Foreign bodes well for the New York newcomer. Do you think this one is an improvement on the original?" Uproxx's Aaron Williams described the guest verses as "ferocious". Jon Powell of Revolt commented, "both southern features effortlessly adapt to the song's unique style". Pitchfork's Ben Dandridge-Lemco gave a negative review, commenting that Lil Baby and Quavo's verses "feel like an unnecessary addition" to the song.

In October 2019, it was announced that Canadian rapper Tory Lanez would be featured on a remix to the song. This version has not been officially released.

== Certifications ==
Region	Certification	Certified units/sales
United States (RIAA)	Platinum	1,000,000^{‡}
^{‡} Sales+streaming figures based on certification alone.
