= 800 B.C. (EP) =

Mixtape by Fivio Foreign
- Released: April 24, 2020
- Recorded: 2019–2020
- Genre: Drill
- Length: 24:11
- Label: Columbia
- Producer: 808Melo; Axl; Bordeaux; Non Native; SAMAN; Szamz; Yamaica

Fivio Foreign chronology
Pain and Love (2019)	800 B.C. (2020)	B.I.B.L.E. (2022)

Singles from 800 BC
- 1. "Big Drip" Released: June 5, 2019; 2. "Big Drip (Remix)" Released: March 13, 2020; 3. "Wetty" Released: March 27, 2020

800 B.C. (with B.C. stylized as Before Corona) is the debut mixtape by American rapper Fivio Foreign. It was released on April 24, 2020, by Columbia Records. It features guest appearances from Meek Mill, Lil Tjay, Quavo, and Lil Baby. Production was handled by 808Melo, Axl, Bordeaux, Non Native, Saman, Szamz, and Yamaica.

== Critical reception ==
Professional ratings
Review scores
Source	Rating
AllMusic	3/5 stars
Pitchfork	5.8/10

Fred Thomas of AllMusic praised the project for having it filled with "harsh drill drums, intense flows, and intimidating ad-libs into compact presentations of fury and swagger". However, Ben Dandridge-Lemco of Pitchfork gave it criticism by stating how "it feels lazily thrown together, with mostly forgettable songs" and that he has "yet to prove himself".

== Track listing ==
800 BC track listing
No.	Title	Writer(s)	Producer(s)	Length
1.	"Drive By"	Maxie Ryles III; Alyamani Ouadah	Yamaica	2:31
2.	"Wetty"	Ryles; Manalla Yusuf; Damjan Mravunac	Axl; SAMAN	3:55
3.	"Big Drip"	Ryles; Yusuf	Axl	2:48
4.	"Demons & Goblins" (featuring Meek Mill)	Ryles; Robert Williams; Luis Campozano; Brendan Walsh	Bordeaux; Non Native	3:25
5.	"Awesome"	Ryles; Szymon Świątczak	Szamz	1:59
6.	"Ambition" (featuring Lil Tjay)	Ryles; Tione Merritt; Andre Loblack	808Melo	2:36
7.	"Issa Vibe"	Ryles; Ouadah	Yamaica	3:25
8.	"Big Drip (Remix)" (featuring Quavo and Lil Baby)	Ryles; Quavious Marshall; Dominique Jones; Yusuf	Axl	4:10
Total length:				24:11
