= I Heard That Noise =

2025 studio album by Quickly, Quickly

Studio album by Quickly, Quickly
- Released: April 18, 2025
- Studios: Kenton Sound; Flora Recording & Playback
- Genres: Art pop; indie folk; indie pop
- Length: 41:36
- Label: Ghostly
- Producers: Quickly, Quickly

Quickly, Quickly chronology
Easy Listening (2023)	I Heard That Noise (2025)

Singles from I Heard That Noise
- 1. "Enything" Released: January 22, 2025; 2. "Take It from Me" Released: March 19, 2025

I Heard That Noise is the second studio album by the American singer-songwriter and record producer Quickly, Quickly, released on April 18, 2025 through Ghostly. It follows his 2021 studio album The Long and Short of It and was completely self-produced and self-written.

== Background and recording ==
Quickly, Quickly released his first studio album, The Long and Short of It in 2021. It marked a departure from his lo-fi beat-making after he signed with Ghostly. He later released an EP, Easy Listening, in 2023.

== Production and composition ==
=== Overview ===
The album is primarily an art pop, indie folk, and indie pop album; Melodic Magazine compared it to the work of Mk.gee, Dijon Duenas, Alex G, and Bon Iver. Quickly, Quickly, a maximalist, had troubles not making the album seem overproduced and had to strip back some of the drums on many of the tracks to fill them with other, more unique, sounds. He also wanted to incorporate long, chopped-up guitar and synth drones in the record.

=== Songs ===
The opening track, "I Heard That Noise", begins with odd sounds before switching into a piano ballad. Stereogum compared "Take It From Me" to work of Nick Drake, especially on the album Bryter Layter. "This House" has Quickly, Quickly, continue to add elements and instruments throughout the song, building up to the end. "This Room" is a more stripped down song that progresses into noise at the end; it is similar to "I Heard That Noise", which has small drums and a xylophone until it switches to fuzzy guitars and cymbals, eventually returning to its calmer noise by the end. "Raven" and "Drawn Away" are generally folk songs with some distortion near the end. The album's closing track, "You Are", is a nearly-ten-minute-long song beginning with a love ballad, transitioning into white noise, and then an instrumental melody.

== Release and promotion ==
Quickly, Quickly announced I Heard That Noise on January 22, 2025, and concurrently released the first single for the album, "Enything". He filmed the music video for the single on a Panasonic camcorder. He released the lyric video to the second single, "Take It From Me", on March 19.

== Critical reception ==
Professional ratings
Review scores
Source	Rating
AllMusic	4/5 stars
PopMatters	8/10
Spectrum Culture	75/100

The album received positive reviews from critics. Fred Thomas of AllMusic rated it four out of five stars, calling it Quickly, Quickly's most engaging work to date, while also noting its vibrant production and personal songwriting. Chris Conaton of PopMatters gave the album an 8/10, highlighting how the weirdness and noise make the album very relistenable. Spectrum Culture's Bill Cooper rated it 75/100, noting the relative inaccessibility of the album for listeners unaccustomed to the harsh sounds, but still recommended exploring it.

== Track listing ==
All tracks are written by Graham Jonson.

I Heard That Noise track listing
No.	Title	Length
1.	"I Heard That Noise"	3:20
2.	"Enything"	4:41
3.	"Take It from Me"	3:18
4.	"This House"	2:32
5.	"This Room"	3:33
6.	"Beginning Band Day One"	1:48
7.	"I Punched Through the Wall"	3:08
8.	"Hero"	3:14
9.	"Raven"	2:44
10.	"Drawn Away"	3:32
11.	"You Are"	9:42
Total length:		41:36

== Personnel ==
Credits adapted from the album's liner notes.

- Graham Jonson – production, recording, mixing
- Dave Cooley – mastering
- Nicholas D'Apolito – design
- Danny Ische – cover art
- Elliot Cleverdon – additional guitar (tracks 2, 4, 11), violins (4)
- Julia Logue – background vocals (2)
- Dana McWayne – saxophone (8)
- Zachary Schleiner – additional guitar, bass (11)
- Myles Martin – drums (11)
- Nancy Teskey – horns (6)
- OES 5th Grade Band – horns (6)
- Ryan Bridenstine – tack piano and Ace Tone organ recording (8, 11)
