= B.I.B.L.E. =

Studio album by Fivio Foreign
- Released: April 8, 2022
- Genre: Drill
- Length: 53:36
- Labels: Columbia; RichFish
- Producers: 808K_Antares; A Lau; Axl; AyoAA; Angelgoat; Beat Menace; Ben Thomas; Bordeaux; Hbeatsmusic; Dem Jointz; Dizzy Banko; Dom Sarfo; DVLP; Franklin; Hemz; J. Perry; Johan Lenox; Julian Akogu; KayCyy; Mav; Mike Dean; Mikewavvs; Niko the Great; Non Native; Ojivolta; Omari Clarke; Producer Jamz; RicoRunDat; Saint Cardona; SethInTheKitchen; Syk Sense; The Chainsmokers; Tweek Tune; Txrgett; Wxrrior; Yoshi

Fivio Foreign chronology
800 B.C. (2020)	B.I.B.L.E. (2022)

Singles from B.I.B.L.E.
- 1. "City of Gods" Released: February 11, 2022; 2. "Magic City" Released: March 18, 2022; 3. "What's My Name" Released: May 24, 2022; 4. "Paris to Tokyo" Released: July 8, 2022

B.I.B.L.E. (a backronym for Basic Instructions Before Leaving Earth) is the debut studio album by American rapper Fivio Foreign. It was released on April 8, 2022, through Columbia Records and RichFish. The production on the album was handled by multiple producers including Kanye West, Mike Dean, the Chainsmokers and Dem Jointz among others. It also features guest appearances from KayCyy, Quavo, Kanye West, Alicia Keys, Queen Naija, Coi Leray, Chlöe, A$AP Rocky, Lil Yachty, Lil Tjay, Yung Bleu, DJ Khaled, Vory, Polo G, Blueface, Ne-Yo, and The Kid LAROI (who was added after the album was released).

The album was preceded by two singles: "City of Gods" (with West and Keys) and "Magic City", the former of which peaking at number 46 on the US Billboard Hot 100. The album received generally positive reviews from music critics and moderate commercial success. The album debuted at number nine on the US Billboard 200 chart, earning 29,000 album-equivalent units in its first week. "What's My Name" was later released as the third single. A fourth single, "Paris to Tokyo" (with The Kid LAROI), was released after the album was, but was soon added to the tracklist afterwards.

== Critical reception ==
Professional ratings
Aggregate scores
Source	Rating
Metacritic	68/100
Review scores
Source	Rating
AllMusic	2.5/5 stars
Clash	7/10
HipHopDX	3.3/5
NME	4/5 stars
Pitchfork	5.2/10
Rolling Stone	3.5/5 stars

B.I.B.L.E. was met with generally positive reviews from music critics. At Metacritic, which assigns a normalized rating out of 100 to reviews from mainstream music critics, the album received an average score of 68, based on 4 reviews, which indicates "generally favourable reviews". Writing for Clash, Ath'e Zihle felt that "although I would not say that this album breaks boundaries or sparks deep emotional response, it is Fivio's formal introduction to the world with a heavy-hitting drill project which will lead the way for future drill projects globally". Kyann-Sian Williams of NME compared B.I.B.L.E. to Kanye West's tenth studio album, Donda (2021), opining that "Fivio Foreign's delivery remains pin-sharp throughout the album, proving that with a few inspired beats, he can produce utter greatness", "with its drill influences and eclecticism, this is perhaps the record 'Donda' could have been, proving that Fivio has plenty of scope to transcend drill culture". Joe Coscarelli of The New York Times wrote that on the album, Fivio "hopes to smooth a path for the city's [New York's] ascendant hip hop scene, even as it draws criticism amid a rise in gun violence" and "tries to maneuver an unconventional sound onto a more conventional path: smoothing down drill's street edge into something safely marketable". David Crone from Allmusic stated that "The majority of B.I.B.L.E. roots itself in cross-over appeal, offering up radio-primed drill anchored in familiar samples and big-hit collaborators, but instead of looking to fight for drill's new boundaries, Fivio makes a quick, and disappointing, grab for stardom. It's hard to fault him for getting the bag, but as long as Fivio keeps his ambitions on the brand, he will step further from excellence. This is a disappointing backpedal from America's drill ambassador."

== Commercial performance ==
B.I.B.L.E. debuted at number nine on the US Billboard 200 chart, earning 29,000 album-equivalent units (including 1,000 copies in pure album sales) in its first week, according to MRC Data. This became Fivio's first US top-ten debut on the chart. The album also accumulated a total of 37.75 million on-demand official streams of the album's songs.

== Track listing ==
B.I.B.L.E. track listing
No.	Title	Writer(s)	Producer(s)	Length
1.	"On God" (featuring KayCyy)	Maxie Ryles III; Mark Mbogo; Johan Lenox; Julian Akogu; Michael Washington, Jr.; Aniko Thomas; Dominick Sanford; Tyler Pittman; Dizzy Fae	KayCyy; Lenox; Akogu; Mikewavvs; Niko the Great; Dom Sarfo	3:06
2.	"Through the Fire" (featuring Quavo)	Ryles; Quavious Marshall; Bigram Zayas; Brendan Walsh; Luis Campozano; Aswad Asif; Adrian Lau; Omari Clarke; Joshua Scruggs; John White; Cristian Tejada	DVLP; Bordeaux; Non Native; AyoAA; A Lau; Clarke; Syk Sense; Producer Jamz; igov	3:25
3.	"Magic City" (featuring Quavo)	Ryles; Marshall; Michael Dean; Manalla Yusuf; Marcin Blonski	Mike Dean; Axl; Franklin	2:38
4.	"City of Gods" (with Kanye West and Alicia Keys)	Ryles; Kanye West; Alicia Cook; Andrew Taggart; Mark Williams; Raul Cubina; Asif; Allan Lopez; Sujeev Thiruketheeswaran; Mavric Ritchie; Dwayne Abernathy, Jr.; Dean; Tejada; Hamza Hamaal; Malik Piper; Britney Amaradio	West; The Chainsmokers; Ojivolta; AyoAA; Tweek Tune; Hemz; Mav; Dem Jointz (co.)	4:16
5.	"What's My Name" (with Queen Naija featuring Coi Leray)	Ryles; Queen Bulls; Brittany Collins; Beyoncé Knowles-Carter; Kelendria Rowland; LeToya Luckett; LaTavia Roberson; LaShawn Daniels; Rodney Jerkins; Fred Jerkins III; Drü Oliver; Jade Amar; Jason L. Patterson; Walsh; Campozano; Asif	Bordeaux; Non Native; BKH Beats; AyoAA	3:21
6.	"For Nothin"	Ryles; Heiko Dorre-Grasso; Martin Targett; Tarik Hemeci	Hbeatsmusic; Txrgett; Yoshi	2:07
7.	"Hello" (featuring Chlöe and KayCyy)	Ryles; Chloe Bailey; Mbogo; Walsh; Campozano; Asif; Washington; Ben Thomas; Tejada; Peter Rycroft; Ellen Murphy; Jamie MacNeal	KayCyy; Bordeaux; Non Native; AyoAA; Mikewavvs; B. Thomas	4:24
8.	"Confidence" (featuring ASAP Rocky)	Ryles; Rakim Mayers; Asif; Walsh; Campozano	AyoAA	1:50
9.	"Slime Them" (featuring Lil Yachty)	Ryles; Miles McCollum; Asif	AyoAA	2:26
10.	"Feel My Struggle"	Ryles; Yusuf; Joseph LoDuca	Axl	2:00
11.	"World Watching" (featuring Lil Tjay and Yung Bleu)	Ryles; Tione Merritt; Jeremy Biddle; Ellie Goulding; Richard Stannard; Ash Howes; Jonathan Perry	J. Perry	3:31
12.	"B.I.B.L.E. Talk" (featuring DJ Khaled)	Ryles; Khaled Khaled; Asif; Salio Bamba	AyoAA; 808K_Antares	1:45
13.	"Changed on Me" (featuring Vory and Polo G)	Ryles; Tavoris Hollins, Jr.; Taurus Bartlett; Dean; Asif; Kevin da Silva	Dean; AyoAA; RicoRunDat	4:01
14.	"Left Side" (featuring Blueface)	Ryles; Johnathan Porter; Walsh; Campozano; Clarke; B. Thomas; Ross Portaro IV; Jade Amar	Bordeaux; Non Native; Clarke; B. Thomas; SethInTheKitchen	3:40
15.	"Love Songs" (featuring Ne-Yo)	Ryles; Shaffer Smith; Mikkel Eriksen; Tor Erik Hermansen; Alex Cunningham; Austin Ruff; Jonathan R. Shapiro; Turran Coleman; Walsh; Campozano	Bordeaux; Non Native	2:38
16.	"Whoever"	Ryles; Dean; Jhonny Cardona; Szymon Wilk	Dean; Saint Cardona; Wxrrior	1:55
17.	"Can't Be Us"	Ryles; Earl Simmons; Walsh; Campozano; Lau; Scruggs; Tejada; Omar Gomez; DeAndre Sumpter; Kaleem-Taylor-Decoteau; Siviwe Mangaza	Bordeaux; Non Native; A Lau; Syk Sense; Dizzy Banko; Beat Menace	4:13
18.	"Paris to Tokyo" (with the Kid Laroi)	Ryles; Charlton Howard; Kevin Nishimura; James Roh; Virman Coquia; Jae Choung; Jonathan Yip; Ray Romulus; Jeremy Reeves; Peter Hernandez; Philip Lawrence; SB	SB	2:10
Total length:				53:36

Notes

- "City of Gods" features additional vocals from Playboi Carti.

Sample credits

- "City of Gods" contains samples from "New York City", written by Andrew Taggart and Britney Amaradio, and performed by the Chainsmokers.
- "What's My Name" contains samples from "Say My Name", written by Beyoncé Knowles-Carter, Kelendria Rowland, LeToya Luckett, LaTavia Roberson, LaShawn Daniels, Rodney Jerkins, and Fred Jerkins III, and performed by Destiny's Child.
- "World Watching" contains samples from "Lights", written by Ellie Goulding, Richard Stannard, and Ash Howes, and performed by Ellie Goulding.
- "Love Songs" contains samples from "So Sick", written by Shaffer Smith, Mikkel Eriksen, and Tor Erik Hermansen, and performed by Ne-Yo.
- "Can't Be Us" interpolates "Slippin'", written by Earl Simmons, and performed by DMX.
- "Paris to Tokyo" contains sample vocals from "Rocketeer", written by Kevin Nishimura, James Roh, Virman Coquia, Jae Choung, Jonathan Yip, Ray Romulus, Jeremy Reeves, Peter Hernandez, Philip Lawrence, and performed by Far East Movement featuring Ryan Tedder.

== Personnel ==
- Mike Dean – mastering, mixing
- German Valdez – mixing, engineering (track 5)
- Todd Bergman – engineering (1)
- Bordeaux – engineering (2, 3)
- Non Native – engineering (2, 4–8, 10, 13–17)
- John Cunningham – engineering (4)
- Earl Washington – engineering (5)
- Simone Torres – engineering (7)
- Gentuar Memishi – engineering (9)
- Barrington Hall – engineering (11)
- Joe Grasso – engineering (12)
- Juan Peña – engineering (12)
- Sean Solymar – engineering assistance
- Tommy Rush – engineering assistance
- Loren Fleisher – engineering assistance (1)
- Carlos Mora – engineering assistance (16)

== Charts ==
Chart performance for B.I.B.L.E.
Chart (2022)	Peak position
Belgian Albums (Ultratop Flanders)	93
Belgian Albums (Ultratop Wallonia)	153
Canadian Albums (Billboard)	8
Dutch Albums (Album Top 100)	47
New Zealand Albums (RMNZ)	40
Swiss Albums (Schweizer Hitparade)	49
UK Albums (Official Charts)	65
US Billboard 200	9
US Top R&B/Hip-Hop Albums (Billboard)	5
