= Diva (The Kid Laroi song) =

2020 single by the Kid Laroi and Lil Tecca

Single by the Kid Laroi featuring Lil Tecca
- Released: 31 January 2020
- Length: 2:52
- Label: Columbia
- Songwriters: Charlton Howard; Dez Wright; Tyler-Justin Sharpe
- Producer: Dez Wright

The Kid Laroi singles chronology
"Let Her Go" (2019)	"Diva" (2020)	"Addison Rae" (2020)

Lil Tecca singles chronology
"Why U Look Mad" (2019)	"Diva" (2020)	"IDK" (2020)

Music video
- "Diva" on YouTube

"Diva" is a song by Australian rapper and singer the Kid Laroi featuring American rapper and singer Lil Tecca. It was released on 31 January 2020 and peaked at number 76 on the ARIA Singles Chart. The song has been certified silver in the United Kingdom, gold in Australia and Brazil, and platinum in New Zealand and the United States.

== Charts ==
Chart performance for "Diva"
Chart (2020)	Peak position
Australia (ARIA)	76
Australia Hip Hop/R&B (ARIA)	23
New Zealand Hot Singles (RMNZ)	6

== Certifications ==
Certifications for "Diva"
Region	Certification	Certified units/sales
Australia (ARIA)	Gold	35,000^{‡}
Brazil (Pro-Música Brasil)	Gold	20,000^{‡}
New Zealand (RMNZ)	Platinum	30,000^{‡}
United Kingdom (BPI)	Silver	200,000^{‡}
United States (RIAA)	Platinum	1,000,000^{‡}
^{‡} Sales+streaming figures based on certification alone.
