= Martina Reilly =

Martina Murphy (Reilly)
- Other names: Tina Reilly
- Website: www.martinamurphyauthor.com

Martina Murphy (Reilly) is an author based in Ireland. She has written teenage fiction under the name Martina Murphy and women's fiction under the names Tina Reilly and Martina Reilly. She also writes plays, teaches drama, and has also worked in journalism.

== Writing career ==
She was originally published by Pooleg but she is now published by Little, Brown Book Group, a division of Hachette Livre, under the 'Sphere' imprint. Martina's novels have been published in many languages including Italian, French, and Greek.

Her teenage books include Livewire, which won an International White Raven Award, and Dirt Tracks which won a Bisto Book merit award in 2000. Dirt Tracks was also shortlisted for an RAI reading Award.

She is now the artistic director of "Down at Heel Productions".

== Bibliography ==
To date she has written eleven women's fiction books including Something Borrowed, which was longlisted for the 2006 International Dublin Literary Award. Her titles are:

- Flipside
- Is This Love?
- The Onion Girl
- Wish Upon a Star
- Something Borrowed
- Wedded Blitz
- Summer of Secrets
- All I Want Is You
- Second Chances
- The Wish List
- A Moment Like Forever
