= Addison Rae (song) =

2020 single by the Kid Laroi

Single by the Kid Laroi
- Released: 22 March 2020
- Length: 2:43
- Label: Columbia
- Songwriters: Charlton Howard; Fabio Aguilar Sixtos; Keanu Torres; Subhaan Rahman
- Producers: Keanu Beats; Haan; Fabio

The Kid Laroi singles chronology
"Diva" (2020)	"Addison Rae" (2020)	"Go Dumb" (2020)

"Addison Rae" is a song by Australian rapper and singer the Kid Laroi, a song named after the American singer Addison Rae. The song was released on 22 March 2020, through Columbia Records, and peaked at number 76 on the ARIA Singles Chart. The song has been certified gold in Australia and the United States.

== Charts ==
Chart performance for "Addison Rae"
Chart (2020)	Peak position
Australia (ARIA)	76
Australia Hip Hop/R&B (ARIA)	26
New Zealand Hot Singles (RMNZ)	13

== Certifications ==
Certifications for "Addison Rae"
Region	Certification	Certified units/sales
Australia (ARIA)	Gold	35,000^{‡}
United States (RIAA)	Gold	500,000^{‡}
^{‡} Sales+streaming figures based on certification alone.
