= What Just Happened =

What Just Happened may refer to:

- What Just Happened (2008 film), an American comedy-drama film directed by Barry Levinson and starring Robert De Niro
- What Just Happened (2018 film), a Nigerian comedy film directed by Charles Uwagbai
- What Just Happened??! with Fred Savage, a 2019 American television talk show parody series starring Fred Savage
