= Nights Like This (The Kid Laroi song) =

Song by the Kid Laroi

from the album The First Time
- A-side: "Girls"
- Released: 10 November 2023
- Length: 1:26
- Label: Columbia
- Songwriters: Charlton Howard; Michael Volpe
- Producer: Clams Casino

Music video
- "Nights Like This" (from "the first time" tour...) on YouTube

"Nights Like This" is a song by Australian rapper and singer the Kid Laroi from his 2023 album The First Time. It went viral and charted internationally in 2024, and was later included as the B-side of his June 2024 single "Girls". A sequel to the song, titled "Nights Like This Pt. 2", was included on the deluxe version of The First Time. At the 2024 ARIA Music Awards, the song was nominated for Song of the Year.

== Charts ==
=== Weekly charts ===
Weekly chart performance for "Nights Like This"
| Chart (2023–2024) | Peak position |
|---|---|
| Australia (ARIA) | 20 |
| Austria (Ö3 Austria Top 40) | 68 |
| Canada Hot 100 (Billboard) | 43 |
| Czech Republic Singles Digital (ČNS IFPI) | 71 |
| Germany (GfK) | 84 |
| Global 200 (Billboard) | 56 |
| Greece International (IFPI) | 46 |
| Iceland (Tónlistinn) | 24 |
| Ireland (IRMA) | 27 |
| Latvia (LAIPA) | 6 |
| Lithuania (AGATA) | 13 |
| Netherlands (Single Tip) | 1 |
| New Zealand (Recorded Music NZ) | 16 |
| Norway (VG-lista) | 34 |
| Poland (Polish Streaming Top 100) | 75 |
| Portugal (AFP) | 89 |
| Slovakia Singles Digital (ČNS IFPI) | 45 |
| Sweden (Sverigetopplistan) | 78 |
| Switzerland (Schweizer Hitparade) | 55 |
| UK Singles (Official Charts) | 28 |
| UK Hip Hop/R&B (Official Charts) | 3 |
| US Billboard Hot 100 | 47 |

=== Year-end charts ===
Year-end chart performance for "Nights Like This"
| Chart (2024) | Position |
|---|---|
| Australia (ARIA) | 84 |
| Switzerland (Schweizer Hitparade) | 96 |

== Certifications ==
Certifications for "Nights Like This"
| Region | Certification | Certified units/sales |
|---|---|---|
| Australia (ARIA) | 2× Platinum | 140,000^{‡} |
| Canada (Music Canada) | Platinum | 80,000^{‡} |
| Denmark (IFPI Danmark) | Gold | 45,000^{‡} |
| France (SNEP) | Gold | 100,000^{‡} |
| Germany (BVMI) | Gold | 300,000^{‡} |
| Hungary (MAHASZ) | 2× Platinum | 8,000^{‡} |
| New Zealand (RMNZ) | 2× Platinum | 60,000^{‡} |
| Poland (ZPAV) | Gold | 25,000^{‡} |
| Portugal (AFP) | Gold | 5,000^{‡} |
| Slovakia (ČNS IFPI) | Gold | €2,000 |
| United Kingdom (BPI) | Platinum | 600,000^{‡} |
| United States (RIAA) | 3× Platinum | 3,000,000^{‡} |
Streaming
| Greece (IFPI Greece) | Gold | 1,000,000^{†} |
^{‡} Sales+streaming figures based on certification alone.^{†} Streaming-only figures based on certification alone.
