= Paris to Tokyo =

2022 single by Fivio Foreign and the Kid Laroi

Single by Fivio Foreign and the Kid Laroi

from the album B.I.B.L.E.
- Released: July 8, 2022
- Recorded: 2021
- Genre: Drill ⋅ hip hop
- Length: 2:11
- Label: Columbia
- Songwriters: Maxie Ryles III; Charlton Howard; Kevin Nishimura; James Roh; Virman Coquia; Jae Choung; Jonathan Yip; Ray Romulus; Jeremy Reeves; Peter Hernandez; Philip Lawrence; SB
- Producer: SB

Fivio Foreign singles chronology
"Lamb Chop" (2022)	"Paris to Tokyo" (2022)	"Groovy" (2022)

The Kid Laroi singles chronology
"Thousand Miles" (2022)	"Paris to Tokyo" (2022)	"Love Again" (2023)

Music video
- "Paris to Tokyo" on YouTube

"Paris to Tokyo" is a song by American rapper Fivio Foreign and Australian rapper and singer the Kid Laroi. It was released through Columbia Records as a single on July 8, 2022, and was added to Fivio's debut studio album, B.I.B.L.E., exactly one week later. The song was solely produced by SB and samples Far East Movement's 2010 single, "Rocketeer", which features Ryan Tedder. On July 1, 2022, exactly one week before the song was released, Fivio and Laroi performed it live for the first time at Wireless Festival in London.

== Composition and lyrics ==
"Paris to Tokyo" is a drill song. Laroi sings the chorus, both before and after the sole verse that Fivio raps. Laroi leans away from his previous alternative pop releases and back into his hip hop roots.

== Music video ==
The official music video for "Paris to Tokyo", directed by Chris Villa, premiered on Fivio's YouTube channel alongside the song's release on July 8, 2022. It sees him and Laroi partying in a club as they rap. As the title of the song suggests, the two artists actually travel from Paris to Tokyo, as they stand behind the Eiffel Tower in the former city and Fivio sports a Rhude outfit as he raps in an arcade in the latter city. The video also includes expensive fast cars and the two artists ad-lib each other's lyrics.

== Credits and personnel ==
- Fivio Foreign – vocals, songwriting
- The Kid Laroi – vocals, songwriting
- Far East Movement
  - Kev Nish – songwriting
  - Prohgress – songwriting
  - DJ Virman – songwriting
  - J-Splif – songwriting
- The Stereotypes
  - Jonathan Yip – songwriting
  - Ray Romulus – songwriting
  - Jeremy Reeves – songwriting
- Bruno Mars – songwriting
- Philip Lawrence – songwriting
- SB – production, songwriting
- Patrizio Pigliapoco – mixing
- Eric Lagg – mastering
- Tyler Chase – recording
- Joe Dougherty – engineering assistance

== Charts ==
Chart performance for "Paris to Tokyo"
Chart (2022)	Peak position
Australia (ARIA)	26
Australia Hip Hop/R&B (ARIA)	7
Canada Hot 100 (Billboard)	53
Ireland (IRMA)	98
New Zealand Hot Singles (RMNZ)	2
US Bubbling Under Hot 100 (Billboard)	6
US Hot R&B/Hip-Hop Songs (Billboard)	35
