= Bleed (The Kid Laroi song) =

2023 single by The Kid Laroi

Single by the Kid Laroi

from the album The First Time
- Released: 3 November 2023
- Genre: Pop rock
- Length: 2:51
- Label: Columbia
- Songwriters: Charlton Howard; Omer Fedi; Blake Slatkin; Billy Walsh
- Producers: Omer Fedi; Blake Slatkin

The Kid Laroi singles chronology
"What Just Happened" (2023)	"Bleed" (2023)	"What's the Move?" (2023)

Music video
- "Bleed" on YouTube

"Bleed" is a song by Australian rapper and singer the Kid Laroi, released on 3 November 2023 through Columbia Records as the sixth single from his debut studio album The First Time (2023). It was produced by Omer Fedi and Blake Slatkin.

== Composition and lyrics ==
"Bleed" is a pop rock ballad that adopts a waltzing tempo and finds Laroi singing over a guitar instrumental about his difficulty in letting go of an ended relationship, while his former lover has already moved on.

== Music video ==
The music video for "Bleed" was directed by Ramez Silyan and premiered alongside the single. In it, Laroi rides his bike and flies off the road. He dreams that he is drowning but revived by his past lover, who is played by Ryley Ladd, before waking up.

== Live performances ==
Laroi performed "Bleed" on Jimmy Kimmel Live! on 29 February 2024, which coincided with the release of the Amazon Prime Video documentary Kids Are Growing Up: A Story About a Kid Named Laroi.

== Credits and personnel ==
Credits adapted from Tidal.

- The Kid Laroi – vocals, songwriting
- Omer Fedi – production, songwriting, bass, drums, guitar, keyboards, programming
- Blake Slatkin – production, songwriting, keyboards, programming
- Billy Walsh – songwriting
- Șerban Ghenea – mixing
- Randy Merrill – mastering

== Charts ==
Chart performance for "Bleed"
Chart (2023)	Peak position
Australia (ARIA)	47
Australia Hip Hop/R&B (ARIA)	8
Canada Hot 100 (Billboard)	86
Ireland (IRMA)	65
New Zealand Hot Singles (RMNZ)	4
UK Singles (Official Charts)	41
US Billboard Hot 100	97

== Certifications ==
Certifications for "Bleed"
Region	Certification	Certified units/sales
Canada (Music Canada)	Gold	40,000^{‡}
New Zealand (RMNZ)	Gold	15,000^{‡}
United States (RIAA)	Gold	500,000^{‡}
^{‡} Sales+streaming figures based on certification alone.
