= Too Much (The Kid Laroi, Jung Kook and Central Cee song) =

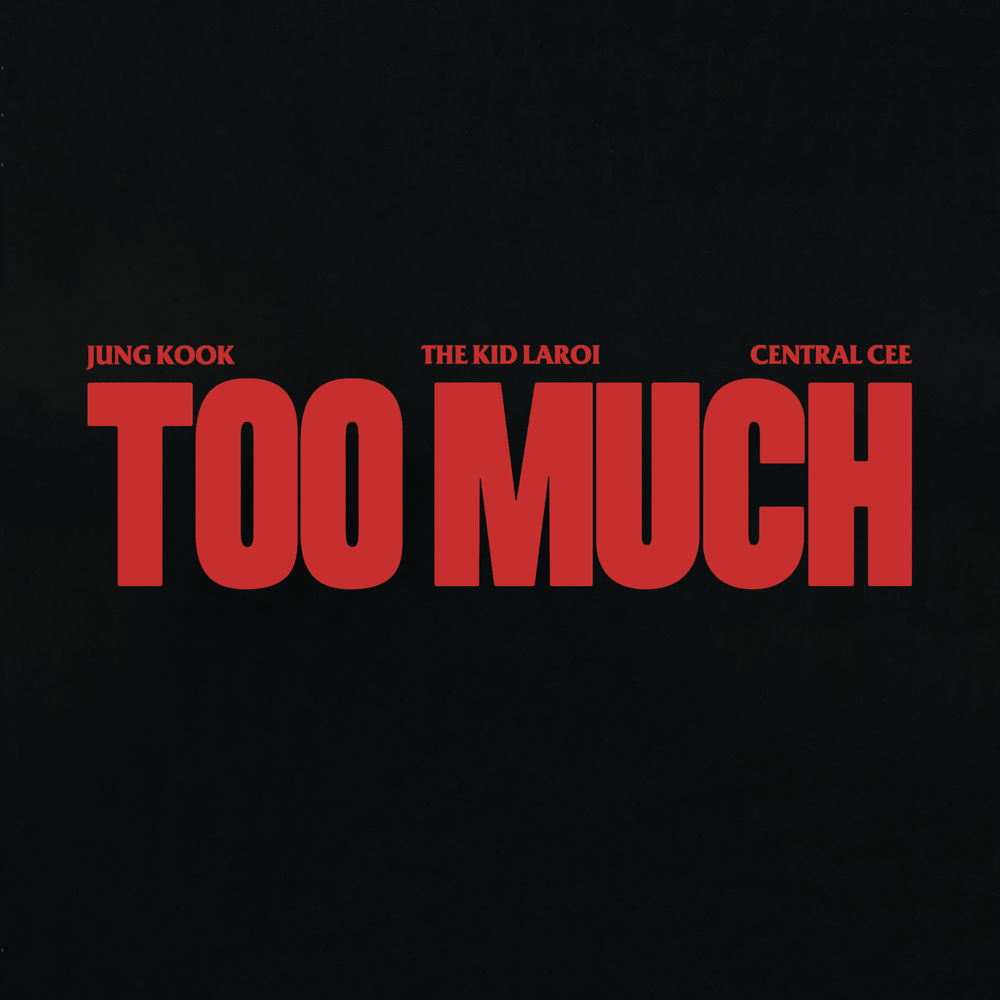

Single by the Kid Laroi, Jung Kook and Central Cee

from the album The First Time
- Released: 20 October 2023
- Genre: Synthpop; pop rap; R&B
- Length: 3:23
- Label: Columbia
- Songwriters: Charlton Howard; Oakley Caesar-Su; Emile Haynie; Omer Fedi; Blake Slatkin; Jasper Harris; Justin Bieber; Billy Walsh; Charlie Flatten
- Producers: Haynie; Fedi; Slatkin; Harris

The Kid Laroi singles chronology
"Where Does Your Spirit Go?" (2023)	"Too Much" (2023)	"What Just Happened" (2023)

Jung Kook singles chronology
"3D" (2023)	"Too Much" (2023)	"Standing Next to You" (2023)

Central Cee singles chronology
"On the Radar Freestyle" (2023)	"Too Much" (2023)	"Nice to Meet You" (2023)

Music video
- "Too Much" on YouTube

"Too Much" is a song by Australian rapper and singer the Kid Laroi, South Korean singer Jung Kook of BTS, and British rapper Central Cee. It was released on 20 October 2023 through Columbia Records as the fourth single from Laroi's debut studio album, The First Time (2023). The rappers wrote the song alongside Justin Bieber, Billy Walsh, Charlie Flatten, and producers Emile Haynie, Omer Fedi, Blake Slatkin, and Jasper Harris. It reached the top ten in Australia, India, Singapore, and the United Kingdom, making Jung Kook the first Korean solo artist to achieve three consecutive top-ten singles on the UK Singles Chart.

== Release and promotion ==
Laroi announced the song on 10 October 2023 and posted a picture of him and Jung Kook in a recording studio two days before. The week before its announcement, he shared a video of Central Cee tattooing the song title on his leg. Laroi also gave his fans the opportunity to purchase CDs of the song with alternate covers and clothing items, while a teaser video for the song was also released.

== Commercial performance ==
"Too Much" debuted at number 10 on the UK Singles Chart, marking the Kid Laroi and Jung Kook's third top-10 single in the UK and Central Cee's seventh overall; it was the highest new entry of the week. With this, Jung Kook became the first Korean solo artist in history to achieve three top-10 songs on the Singles Chart; Psy previously held the record with two top-10 singles in the UK ("Gangnam Style" in 2012, and "Gentleman" in 2013).

In territories outside of the United States, "Too Much" accumulated 31.5 million streams globally and sold 14,000 copies during the period dated 20–26 October 2023. It debuted at number 10 on Billboard's Global Excl. US chart (issue dated 4 November), earning both the Kid Laroi and Central Cee their second top-10 entry on the ranking—after "Stay" and "Sprinter" respectively—and Jung Kook his seventh, the most for a member of BTS.

== Charts ==
=== Weekly charts ===
Chart performance for "Too Much"
Chart (2023–2024)	Peak position
Australia (ARIA)	10
Australia Hip Hop/R&B (ARIA)	2
Belgium (Ultratop 50 Wallonia)	45
Canada Hot 100 (Billboard)	31
Canada CHR/Top 40 (Billboard)	21
Czech Republic Airplay (ČNS IFPI)	39
France (SNEP)	126
Germany (GfK)	80
Global 200 (Billboard)	11
Greece International (IFPI)	28
Hong Kong (Billboard)	18
India International Singles (IMI)	6
Ireland (IRMA)	19
Japan Hot 100 (Billboard)	95
Japan Digital Singles (Oricon) Explicit	11
Japan Digital Singles (Oricon) Clean	40
Lithuania (AGATA)	19
Malaysia (Billboard)	19
Malaysia International (RIM)	13
MENA (IFPI)	16
Netherlands (Single Tip)	29
Netherlands (Tipparade)	15
New Zealand (Recorded Music NZ)	37
Norway (VG-lista)	37
Portugal (AFP)	85
San Marino (SMRRTV Top 50)	38
Singapore (RIAS)	7
South Korea (Circle)	94
Sweden (Sverigetopplistan)	60
Switzerland (Schweizer Hitparade)	53
UAE (IFPI)	13
UK Singles (OCC)	10
US Billboard Hot 100	44
US Adult Pop Airplay (Billboard)	22
US Pop Airplay (Billboard)	15
US Rhythmic Airplay (Billboard)	13
Vietnam (Vietnam Hot 100)	14

=== Monthly charts ===
Monthly chart performance
Chart (2023)	Position
South Korea (Circle)	198

== Certifications ==
Certifications
Region	Certification	Certified units/sales
Canada (Music Canada)	Gold	40,000^{‡}
United States (RIAA)	Gold	500,000^{‡}
^{‡} Sales+streaming figures based on certification alone.

== Release history ==
Release dates and formats
Region	Date	Format	Label	Ref.
Various	20 October 2023	Digital download; streaming	Columbia	
United States	20 October 2023	CD single	Columbia	
Italy	27 October 2023	Radio airplay	Sony	
