= Quickly, Quickly =

American singer-songwriter and record producer (born 2000)

- Born: Graham Jonson; August 4, 2000 (age 26); Portland, Oregon
- Genres: Lo-fi hip hop; indie folk; indie pop; jazz fusion
- Years active: 2014–present
- Label: Ghostly International

Graham Jonson (born August 4, 2000), also known as Quickly, Quickly, is an American singer-songwriter and record producer. Based in Portland, Oregon, he originally created instrumental beats on SoundCloud. In 2021, he signed to Ghostly International and has since released two studio albums under the label, The Long and Short of It in 2021 and I Heard That Noise in 2025.

== Early life ==
Graham Jonson was born on August 4, 2000, in Portland, Oregon. He would frequently use his family's piano, even as a toddler, and his mother, a special-education teacher, played musicians such as John Denver, Dan Fogelberg, and James Taylor in their household. Jonson began to be interested in creating music after his cousin played "Harlem Shake" to his enjoyment. It led to him Googling trap music and eventually finding a community of producers on SoundCloud.

== Career ==
Jonson initially gained recognition as a teenager through his lo-fi hip hop instrumental beats that he released on SoundCloud. One such beat, "getsomerest/sleepwell", was reposted to a lo-fi YouTube channel and became very popular. Jonson moved to Los Angeles to try to garner connections, but he was unable to find any, eventually only making beats the whole time, and moved back after eleven months.

After signing to Ghostly International in 2021, he released his first studio album, The Long and Short of It, on August 20, 2021. He had to cancel the album's tour midway through due to financial concerns. On April 18, 2025, he Jonson released I Heard That Noise, his second album.

== Influences and artistry ==
Jonson describes his music as "Portland Music", characterized by its lofty, eclectic, and hard-to-categorize sound. He has stated that, in his new music, he wants to shed his previous reputation of a "Lo-Fi Beats To Study To" musician. Jonson frequently includes what he calls "musical jumpscares," where the song abruptly switches direction, in his music. He was inspired to do this by other Pacific Northwest-based artists such as The Microphones, Elliott Smith, Grouper, and Loscil. Jonson describes Mount Eerie as his favorite musician. When he was only making instrumental music, Jonson only listened to beats and was influenced by artists such as J Dilla, Madlib, The Pharcyde, and Burial, but started listening to much of The Beatles and D'Angelo when venturing into songwriting. Other influences include Dijon Duenas and Nick Drake.

== Discography ==
=== Studio albums ===
Title	Details
Quickly Quickly, Vol. 1	Released: April 16, 2017; Label: Self-released; Formats: Digital download
Paths	Released: March 1, 2018; Label: Radio Juicy; Formats: Digital download
The Long and Short of It	Released: August 20, 2021; Label: Ghostly International; Formats: Digital download, LP
I Heard That Noise	Released: April 18, 2025; Label: Ghostly International; Formats: Digital download, LP

=== Extended plays ===
Title	Details
Over Skies	Released: August 3, 2018; Label: 823 Records; Formats: Digital download
Easy Listening	Released: May 26, 2023; Label: Ghostly International; Formats: Digital download

=== Singles ===
Title	Year	Album
"Gorge"	2017	Non-album singles
"Solace"	2018	Non-album singles
"Stay Up"	2018	Non-album singles
"Grave/Luvagain"	2018	Non-album singles
"Lesson on Counting"	2019	Non-album singles
"Satellite"	2023	Easy Listening
"Falling Apart Without You"	2023	Easy Listening
"From The Morning"	2024	Non-album singles
"Enything"	2025	I Heard That Noise
"Raven"	2025	I Heard That Noise
"Take It From Me"	2025	I Heard That Noise
