= The First Time (The Kid Laroi album) =

2023 studio album by the Kid Laroi

Studio album by the Kid Laroi
- Released: 10 November 2023 (original); 9 August 2024 (deluxe)
- Genres: Hip hop; pop rap; emo rap; alternative hip hop; alt-pop
- Length: 51:30
- Label: Columbia
- Producers: Andrew Watt; Auz the Kid; Benny Bock; Billy Walsh; Blake Slatkin; Bnyx; BoogzDaBeast; Cirkut; Clams Casino; Dez Wright; Dopamine; Emile Haynie; Fallwood; FnZ; Gent!; Jasper Harris; Jim-E Stack; Jon Bellion; John Cunningham; Keanu Beats; Khaled Rohaim; Louis Bell; Lil Yachty; Michael Uzowuru; Mickey de Grand IV; MitchGoneMad; Mk.gee; Nami; Omer Fedi; Parisi; Pete Nappi; Pro Logic; Quickly, Quickly; Rogét Chahayed; Shellback; SkipOnDaBeat; Snubnose Frankenstein; Tenroc; Dylan Wiggins; WessGoneMad

The Kid Laroi chronology
F*ck Love (2020)	The First Time (2023)	Before I Forget (2026)

Singles from The First Time
- 1. "Love Again" Released: 27 January 2023; 2. "Kids Are Growing Up (Part 1)" Released: 10 February 2023; 3. "Where Does Your Spirit Go?" Released: 21 April 2023; 4. "Too Much" Released: 20 October 2023; 5. "What Just Happened" Released: 27 October 2023; 6. "Bleed" Released: 3 November 2023; 7. "What's the Move?" Released: 8 November 2023

The First Time is the debut studio album by Australian singer and rapper the Kid Laroi. It was released on 10 November 2023 through Columbia, with the deluxe edition being released on 9 August 2024. The album contains guest appearances from Jung Kook, Central Cee, Future, BabyDrill, YoungBoy Never Broke Again, Robert Glasper, and D4vd. The deluxe edition adds an additional guest appearance from Lil Yachty. Production was handled by FnZ, Parisi, Omer Fedi, Blake Slatkin, Bnyx, F1lthy, Emile Haynie, Clams Casino, Michael Uzowuru, Shellback, Cirkut, Louis Bell, and Mk.gee, among others.

The album was nominated for Album of the Year at the National Indigenous Music Awards 2024. At the 2024 J Awards, the album was nominated for Australian Album of the Year.

At the 2024 ARIA Music Awards, the album was nominated for Best Hip Hop/Rap Release and earned Laroi a nomination for Best Solo Artist.

== Background and release ==
In January 2022, Laroi first revealed the then-potential title of the album before referring to it as Kids Are Growing Up in March. On 12 January 2023, Laroi posted an album trailer on YouTube, first teasing the album title and announcing the lead single "Love Again". To release "the best music possible", he had "to take some time away from everything". The era officially kicked off on 19 January with a 95-second intro song "I Can't Go Back to the Way It Was (Intro)", which did not end up on the final tracklist. In an interview with Billboard in February, he explained that his debut was born out of "little ideas" and distanced himself from his previous mixtape F*ck Love 3, calling it "immature" and "a heat of the moment statement". On 2 August, after four months of silence on the project, he announced that the album was finished, except for mixing and mastering. He referred to the record as "the best music" he had ever made up to that point, and mentioned a short film accompanying the album release. The rapper and singer reassured fans of The First Time being his best work in an official announcement post of the album on 25 October, following the release of the single "Too Much" with Jungkook and Central Cee. Laroi shared the album tracklist on 1 November in an Instagram post. The album's deluxe edition was released on 9 August 2024. In 2026, "The Line" was removed off of the album due to the ongoing legal issues D4vd has been involved in.

=== Singles ===
The lead single of the album, "Love Again", was released on 27 January 2023. The second single, "Kids Are Growing Up (Part 1)", was released on 10 February 2023. The third single, "Where Do Your Spirit Go?", was released on 21 April 2023. The fourth single, "Too Much", a collaboration with South Korean singer Jung Kook and British rapper Central Cee, was released on 20 October 2023. The fifth single, "What Just Happened", was released exactly a week later. The sixth single, "Bleed", was released exactly a week after that. The seventh and final single, "What's the Move?", a collaboration with American rappers Future and BabyDrill, was released on 8 November 2023, two days before the album was released.

On 26 January 2024, "Heaven" was released as the first single for the album's deluxe edition. On 28 June 2024, the deluxe edition's second single, "Girls", was released. "Baby I'm Back" was sent to Italian radio stations as the deluxe edition's third single on 27 September 2024. The single "Thousand Miles", released on 22 April 2022, is also included on the deluxe edition.

== Reception ==
Professional ratings
Aggregate scores
Source	Rating
Metacritic	58/100
Review scores
Source	Rating
AllMusic	3/5 stars
The Guardian	3/5 stars
NME	3/5 stars
Slant Magazine	2/5 stars

According to the review aggregator Metacritic, The First Time received "mixed or average reviews" based on a weighted average score of 58 out of 100 from 4 critic scores. According to Slant, "The First Time features some of his weakest hooks to date and a slew of songs that are so unsatisfyingly short so as to feel half-finished."

== Commercial performance ==
In Australia, The First Time debuted at number three on the ARIA Albums Chart, becoming Laroi's second top-three entry, following F*ck Love. It became his second top-40 album in the United Kingdom, entering the UK Albums Chart at number 29.

== Track listing ==
The First Time track listing
No.	Title	Writer(s)	Producer(s)	Length
1.	"Sorry"	Charlton Howard; Michael Mulé; Isaac De Boni; Jahmal Gwin; Edgar Ferrera; Antonio Zito; Giampaolo Parisi; Marco Parisi; Khadijah Anwar; Thomas McGee	FnZ; BoogzDaBeast; SkipOnDaBeat; Dopamine; Parisi	3:12
2.	"Bleed"	C. Howard; Omer Fedi; Blake Slatkin; Billy Walsh	Fedi; Slatkin	2:49
3.	"I Thought That I Needed You"	C. Howard; Benjamin Saint Fort; Jacco Troost; Richard Ortiz	Bnyx; Fallwood; F1lthy^{[a]}	2:51
4.	"Where Do You Sleep?"	C. Howard; Mulé; De Boni; Fedi; Slatkin; Dylan Cleary-Krell; Dylan Teixeira; Austin Howard; Anthony Hester	FnZ; Fedi; Slatkin; Dopamine; Dez Wright; Nami; Auz the Kid	3:12
5.	"Too Much" (with Jung Kook and Central Cee)	C. Howard; Oakley Caesar-Su; Emile Haynie; Fedi; Slatkin; Jasper Harris; Justin Bieber; Walsh	Haynie; Fedi^{[p]}; Slatkin^{[p]}; Harris; Jenna Andrews^{[v]}; Stephen Kirk^{[v]}	3:23
6.	"Tear Me Apart"	C. Howard; John Cunningham	Cunningham	1:54
7.	"Strangers (Interlude)"	C. Howard		0:25
8.	"Nights Like This"	C. Howard; Michael Volpe	Clams Casino	1:26
9.	"What's the Move?" (with Future and BabyDrill)	C. Howard; Nayvadius Wilburn; DelQuristo Wilson; Mulé; De Boni; Zito; G. Parisi; M. Parisi; Mickey de Grand IV; Gerard Ferrer	FnZ; Dopamine; Parisi; De Grand	3:19
10.	"Strangers Pt. 2 (Interlude)"	C. Howard; Bieber		0:43
11.	"Call Me Instead" (featuring YoungBoy Never Broke Again and Robert Glasper)	C. Howard; Kentrell Gaulden; Robert Glasper; Michael Uzowuru; Fedi; Slatkin; Benny Bock; Douglas Ford; Ryley Ladd	Uzowuru; Fedi; Slatkin; Bock	3:17
12.	"Deserve You"	C. Howard; Sampha Sisay; Mulé; De Boni; Zito; Keanu Torres; Andrew Franklin	FnZ; Dopamine; Keanu Beats; Pro Logic	2:37
13.	"What Went Wrong???"	C. Howard; Saint Fort; Graham Jonson	Bnyx; Quickly, Quickly; Nicco Catalano^{[v]}	2:37
14.	"What Just Happened"	C. Howard; Karl Schuster; Fedi; Slatkin; Walsh	Slatkin^{[p]}; Fedi^{[p]}; Shellback^{[p]}	2:42
15.	"You"	C. Howard; Fedi; Slatkin; James Stack; Micah Gordon; Richard Swift; Kacy Hill; Walsh	Fedi; Slatkin; Jim-E Stack	2:16
16.	"Love Again"	C. Howard; Henry Walter; Fedi; Walsh	Cirkut^{[p]}; Fedi^{[p]}	2:26
17.	"Where Does Your Spirit Go?"	C. Howard; Mulé; De Boni; Louis Bell; Walsh	FnZ; Bell^{[p]}	3:25
18.	"You Never Forget Your First Time..."	C. Howard; A. Howard; Walsh; TJ Mizell; Elisha Herbert		2:05
19.	"Kids Are Growing Up"	C. Howard; Michael Gordon	Mk.gee; Catalano^{[v]}	4:20
Total length:				51:30

Deluxe version additional tracks
No.	Title	Writer(s)	Producer(s)	Length
1.	"Baby I'm Back"	C. Howard; Zito; J.C. Crowley; Peter Beckett	Dopamine; Rogét Chahayed	2:51
2.	"Stick with Me"	C. Howard; Zito; Attrell Cordes; Gary Kemp	Dopamine; Khaled Rohaim	2:32
3.	"Pick Sides"	C. Howard; Walsh; Haynie; Fedi	Omer Fedi; Emile Haynie	2:52
4.	"Nights Like This Pt 2"	C. Howard; Zito; Volpe	Clams Casino; Dopamine	2:46
5.	"Hatred" (featuring Lil Yachty)	C. Howard; Miles McCollum; Brandon Mitchell; Gentuar Memishi; George Hunter; Shakir Givens; Spencer Jewesson	Lil Yachty; Gent!; MitchGoneMad; Snubnose Frankenstein; WessGoneMad	2:52
6.	"Girls"	C. Howard; Alexander Izquierdo; Jason Cornet; Jon Bellion; Pete Nappi; Chahayed	Chahayed; Tenroc; Nappi; Bellion	2:32
7.	"Thousand Miles"	C. Howard; Andrew Wotman; Walsh; Bell	Andrew Watt; Bell	2:44
8.	"Heaven"	C. Howard; Walsh; Slatkin; Bell; Fedi	Fedi; Slatkin	2:54
Total length:				73:33

Notes

- ^{^[p]} signifies a primary and vocal producer.
- ^{^[a]} signifies an additional producer.
- ^{^[v]} signifies a vocal producer.
- "The Line" was removed from digital platforms and streaming services in April 2026 following controversies regarding D4vd.

Sample credits

- "Sorry" contains samples of "That's Love", written by Khadi Jon Anwar, and performed by Sugar Hill, and "Takes a Little Time", written and performed by Tommy McGee.
- "I Thought I Needed You" contains a sample of "Pictures", written and performed by Dave Dust.
- "Deserve You" contains a sample of "Can't Get Close", written and performed by Sampha.
- "You" contains a sample of "Can We", written by Jim-E Stack, Kacy Hill and Micah Gordon, and performed by Stack and Hill.

== Personnel ==
Musicians

- The Kid Laroi – lead vocals
- Marco Parisi – keyboards, programming (tracks 1, 9)
- Giampaolo Parisi – programming, synthesizer (tracks 1, 9)
- Victor DeWitt – additional vocals (track 1)
- Omer Fedi – guitar (tracks 2, 11, 14, 15, 17); keyboards (2, 5, 11); bass guitar, programming (tracks 2, 15, 17), drums (2), synthesizer (5, 15, 17), strings (5), piano (10)
- Blake Slatkin – programming (track 2, 15), keyboards (2), bass guitar (5, 15); guitar, synthesizer (15)
- Jung Kook – vocals (track 5)
- Central Cee – vocals (track 5)
- Jasper Harris – keyboards, strings (track 5)
- John Cunningham – guitar, piano (track 6)
- Future – vocals (track 9)
- BabyDrill – vocals (track 9)
- Justin Bieber – writer (5), vocals (track 10)
- Ely Rise – bass guitar, keyboards (track 11)
- Robert Glasper – writer, piano (track 11)
- Youngboy Never Broke Again – vocals (track 11)
- Ryley Ladd – vocals (track 11)
- D4vd – vocals (track 14)
- Shellback – bass guitar, drums, guitar, programming, synthesizer (track 15)
- Cirkut – programming, synthesizer (track 17)
- Austin Howard (Auz the Kid) – production (track 4), vocals (track 19)
- Billy Walsh – writer (tracks 2, 5, 15, 16–19), vocals (track 19)
- Elisha Herbert – vocals (track 19)
- TJ Mizell – vocals (track 19)

Technical

- Randy Merrill – mastering
- Manny Marroquin – mixing (tracks 1, 3, 4, 9, 12)
- Serban Ghenea – mixing (tracks 2, 5, 16–18, 20)
- Mark "Spike" Stent – mixing (tracks 6, 14)
- Antonio Zito – mixing (track 8), engineering (tracks 1, 3, 4, 8, 9, 12)
- Graham Cruser – mixing (track 13)
- Nicco Catalano – mixing (track 13)
- Blake Slatkin – engineering (tracks 4, 15)
- Eric Manco – engineering (track 9)
- Omer Fedi – engineering (track 15)
- Shellback – engineering (track 15)
- Jeremy Daniels – engineering assistance (track 13)
- Bryce Bordone – engineering assistance (tracks 15, 17)

== Charts ==
=== Weekly charts ===
Weekly chart performance for The First Time
Chart (2023–2024)	Peak position
Australian Albums (ARIA)	3
Australian Hip Hop/R&B Albums (ARIA)	1
Belgian Albums (Ultratop Flanders)	50
Canadian Albums (Billboard)	16
Danish Albums (Hitlisten)	19
Dutch Albums (Album Top 100)	30
French Albums (SNEP)	165
German Albums (Offizielle Top 100)	65
Irish Albums (Official Charts)	33
New Zealand Albums (RMNZ)	7
Norwegian Albums (VG-lista)	3
Portuguese Albums (AFP)	129
Swiss Albums (Schweizer Hitparade)	78
UK Albums (Official Charts)	29
US Billboard 200	24

=== Year-end charts ===
2024 year-end chart performance for The First Time
Chart (2024)	Position
Australian Albums (ARIA)	67
Australian Hip Hop/R&B Albums (ARIA)	17
US Billboard 200	191

2025 year-end chart performance for The First Time
Chart (2025)	Position
Australian Albums (ARIA)	92
Australian Hip Hop/R&B Albums (ARIA)	21

== Certifications ==
Certifications for The First Time
Region	Certification	Certified units/sales
Australia (ARIA)	Platinum	70,000^{‡}
Canada (Music Canada)	Platinum	80,000^{‡}
Denmark (IFPI Danmark)	Gold	10,000^{‡}
New Zealand (RMNZ)	Platinum	15,000^{‡}
United Kingdom (BPI)	Silver	60,000^{‡}
United States (RIAA)	Platinum	1,000,000^{‡}
^{‡} Sales+streaming figures based on certification alone.
