= Fivio Foreign =

American rapper (born 1990)

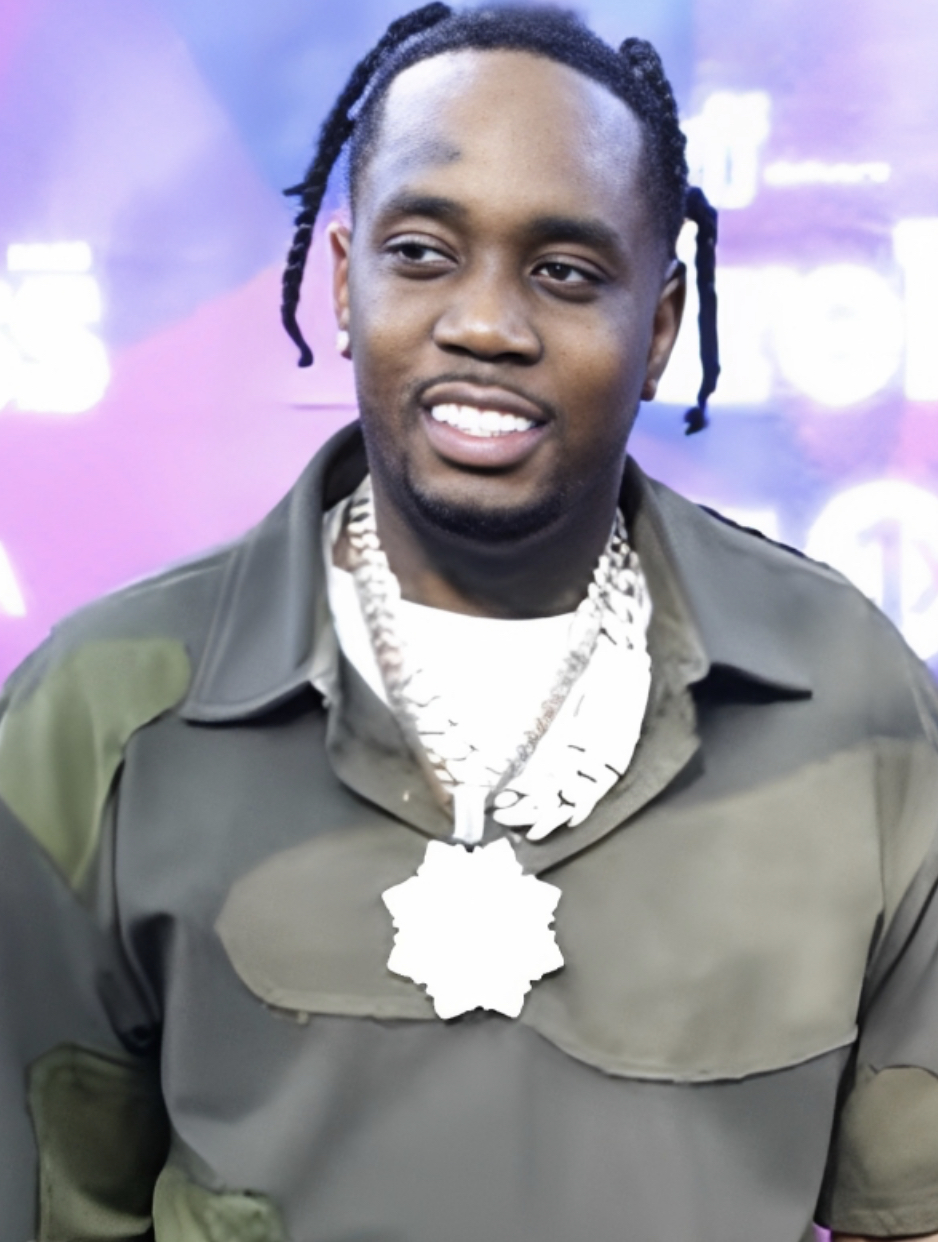
- Fivio Foreign in 2023

Background information
- Also known as: Lite Fivio
- Born: Maxie Lee Ryles III; March 29, 1990 (age 36); East Flatbush, Brooklyn, New York City, U.S.
- Genres: East Coast hip-hop; Brooklyn drill; drill
- Occupations: Rapper; songwriter
- Years active: 2011–present
- Labels: RichFish; Columbia (former)
- Children: 3
- Website: fivioforeign.com

Maxie Lee Ryles III (born March 29, 1990), known by his stage name Fivio Foreign (/ˈfaɪvioʊ/ FY-vee-oh), is an American rapper from Brooklyn. He first gained recognition for his 2019 single "Big Drip", which received platinum certification by the Recording Industry Association of America (RIAA) and spawned a remix featuring Lil Baby and Quavo. That same year, he signed with fellow New York rapper Mase's RichFish Records, in a joint venture with Columbia Records.

Ryles made his first entries on the Billboard Hot 100 with his guest appearances on the 2020 songs "Demons" by Drake and "Zoo York" by Lil Tjay—alongside Pop Smoke. He saw his furthest recognition for his appearance alongside Playboi Carti on Kanye West's 2021 single "Off the Grid", which peaked at number 11 on the chart and remains his highest-charting song. His debut studio album, B.I.B.L.E. (2022), peaked within the Billboard 200's top ten and yielded critical praise; it was led by the single "City of Gods" (with Kanye West and Alicia Keys).

Ryles was nominated for Best New Artist at the 2022 BET Awards.

== Early life ==
Ryles was born and raised in East Flatbush, Brooklyn. In his youth, he was sent to Connecticut during the summer as part of the Fresh Air Fund. He started rapping under the name "Lite Fivio" in 2011. In 2013, he changed his name to Fivio Foreign and formed a music collective with his friends under the name 800 Foreign Side.

After Ryles's mother died, Ryles lived on the streets or with some friends and family members.

== Career ==
Ryles first gained attention following the release of his single "Big Drip". The song received platinum certification by the Recording Industry Association of America (RIAA) and was included on his extended plays Pain and Love (2019) and 800 B.C. (2020). In November 2019, he signed to fellow New York City native rapper Mase's record label, RichFish Records, with a US$5,000 cash money advance brought forth by the rapper. The deal was in a joint venture with Columbia Records.

In May 2020, Ryles earned his first two Billboard Hot 100 entries with his guest appearances on "Demons" by Drake and "Zoo York" by Lil Tjay. The same month, Ryles launched the non-profit organization Foreignside Foundation, "geared towards providing beneficial resources and programs for at-risk youth, the homeless, current and former gang-affiliated individuals, incarcerated individuals".

On August 11, 2020, Ryles was included on XXL's 2020 Freshman Class. Throughout the rest of 2020, he appeared on a number of songs by other artists, including Nas' "Spicy", DreamDoll's “Ah Ah Ah”, Tory Lanez's "K Lo K", French Montana's "That's a Fact (Remix)", and King Von's "I Am What I Am". In November 2020, he released the single "Trust". He also released the Christmas song "Baddie on My Wish List" on December 3, as part of Apple Music's holiday project Carols Covered.

In 2021, he guest performed alongside Playboi Carti on Kanye West's single "Off the Grid", from the latter's tenth album Donda.

On February 11, 2022, he released the lead single for his debut album B.I.B.L.E.: "City of Gods" (with Kanye West and Alicia Keys), which was dedicated to his late friend T-Dott Woo. On the same day, the release date for his album B.I.B.L.E. was revealed to be March 25, 2022, but was eventually pushed back to April 8, 2022. On March 18, he released the second single for the album, "Magic City" (featuring Quavo). On April 8, B.I.B.L.E. was released and debuted at number nine on the Billboard 200, with 29,000 equivalent album units derived from 37.75 million streams, but only 1,000 pure album sales. The album contained guest appearances from A$AP Rocky, Polo G, Lil Yachty, Quavo, DJ Khaled, Ne-Yo, Queen Naija, and Lil Tjay, among others. Ryles and fellow Brooklyn rapper 6ix9ine took to social media to compare B.I.B.L.E. with 6ix9ine's album TattleTales from 2020, which hit number four on the same chart but dropped to number 60 the next week. Later that year, the album spawned the single "Paris to Tokyo" (with the Kid Laroi). In December 2023, he released the single "Teach Me How to Drill" (with Lil Mabu).

On December 5, 2025, Ryles collaborated with Timbaland and the latter's AI creation, Tata Taktumi, on the single "Rack It Up".

== Personal life ==
In 2016, Ryles's mother died from a stroke.

Ryles has three children; two with his ex-girlfriend Jasmine, and a son with another woman.

Ryles was friends with the late Pop Smoke and King Von who were both killed in 2020. He was also close friends with T-Dott Woo, who was murdered on February 1, 2022. Ryles posted a tribute on Instagram following his passing.

In 2022, Florida rapper Mellow Rackz revealed she was in a romantic relationship with Ryles, just weeks after Ryles' separation with his longtime girlfriend Jasmine.

Ryles endorsed Donald Trump's 2024 presidential campaign, releasing the single "Onboa47rd" with Florida rapper Kodak Black in support of Trump.

Ryles was arrested and detained on January 5, 2025 for unlawful possession of a weapon, terroristic threats, and aggravated assault after threatening a woman with a gun. In May 2025, he entered a plea deal, pleading guilty to making terroristic threats and threatening to commit violence.

Ryles is a Christian. He was baptized in August 2026.

== Discography ==
Studio albums

- B.I.B.L.E. (2022)

== Awards and nominations ==
Awards and nominations for Fivio Foreign
Organization	Year	Award	Work	Result	Ref.
BET Hip Hop Awards	2022	Best New Hip Hop Artist	Himself	Nominated	
BET Hip Hop Awards	2022	Impact Track	"City of Gods"	Nominated	
Berlin Music Video Awards	2022	Best Cinematography	City of Gods	Nominated	
