= Girls (The Kid Laroi song) =

Single by the Kid Laroi

from the album The First Time (Deluxe Version)
- B-side: "Nights Like This"
- Released: 28 June 2024
- Genre: R&B
- Length: 2:32
- Label: Columbia
- Songwriters: Charlton Howard; Xplicit; Tenroc; Jon Bellion; Pete Nappi; Rogét Chahayed
- Producers: Jon Bellion; Pete Nappi; Rogét Chahayed; Tenroc

The Kid Laroi singles chronology
| "Still Yours" (2024) | "Girls" (2024) | "Baby I'm Back" (2024) |

Music video
- "Girls" on YouTube

"Girls" is a song by Australian rapper and singer the Kid Laroi from the deluxe edition of his debut studio album, The First Time (2024). It was released as a single on 28 June 2024 through Columbia Records. It was issued with the viral "Nights Like This" from the album The First Time as an A-side. The Kid Laroi wrote the song with Xplicit, Tenroc, Jon Bellion, Pete Nappi and Rogét Chahayed, with the latter four also producing it. The track was issued alongside its music video.

At the 2024 ARIA Music Awards, the song was nominated for Best Pop Release.

At the National Indigenous Music Awards 2025 the song was nominated for Song of the Year.

At the 2025 ARIA Music Awards, the song won for ARIA Award for Song of the Year.

In 2026, a remix featuring vocals from American R&B singer Kehlani was released.

== Critical reception ==
Conor Lochrie of Rolling Stone called the Kid Laroi "chillness personified on his new release, recalling the R&B-meets-pop style of Justin Timberlake and Pharrell in the early 2000s".

== Music video ==
The music video was released alongside the song on 28 June 2024, and was directed by Bradley Calder. It includes appearances from social media influencers Alix Earle, Livvy Dunne, Valkyrae and Lily Chee, among others.

== Track listing ==
Digital single
| No. | Title | Writer(s) | Producer(s) | Length |
|---|---|---|---|---|
| 1. | "Girls" | Charlton Howard; Xplicit; Tenroc; Jon Bellion; Pete Nappi; Rogét Chahayed | Bellion; Nappi; Chahayed; Tenroc | 2:32 |
| 2. | "Nights Like This" | C. Howard; Michael Volpe | Clams Casino | 1:26 |

== Charts ==
=== Weekly charts ===
Weekly chart performance for "Girls"
| Chart (2024–2026) | Peak position |
|---|---|
| Australia (ARIA) | 18 |
| Australia Hip Hop/R&B (ARIA) | 4 |
| Austria (Ö3 Austria Top 40) | 57 |
| Canada Hot 100 (Billboard) | 24 |
| Canada CHR/Top 40 (Billboard) | 15 |
| Canada Hot AC (Billboard) | 32 |
| Czech Republic Airplay (ČNS IFPI) | 33 |
| Estonia Airplay (TopHit) | 9 |
| Finland (Suomen virallinen lista) | 50 |
| Germany (GfK) | 66 |
| Global 200 (Billboard) | 62 |
| Greece International (IFPI) | 33 |
| India International (IMI) | 10 |
| Ireland (IRMA) | 54 |
| Japan Hot Overseas (Billboard Japan) | 9 |
| Netherlands (Single Top 100) | 90 |
| New Zealand (Recorded Music NZ) | 26 |
| Nigeria Airplay (TurnTable) | 92 |
| Norway (VG-lista) | 27 |
| Portugal (AFP) | 90 |
| Slovakia Singles Digital (ČNS IFPI) | 97 |
| Sweden (Sverigetopplistan) | 51 |
| Switzerland (Schweizer Hitparade) | 58 |
| UK Singles (Official Charts) | 47 |
| UK Hip Hop/R&B (Official Charts) | 7 |
| US Billboard Hot 100 | 51 |
| US Pop Airplay (Billboard) | 20 |
| US Rhythmic Airplay (Billboard) | 20 |

Weekly chart performance for "Girls" (Remix)
| Chart (2026) | Peak position |
|---|---|
| Italy (FIMI) | 93 |
| New Zealand Hot Singles (RMNZ) | 13 |

=== Monthly charts ===
Monthly chart performance for "Girls"
| Chart (2024) | Position |
|---|---|
| Estonia Airplay (TopHit) | 14 |

=== Year-end charts ===
Year-end chart performance for "Girls"
| Chart (2024) | Position |
|---|---|
| Australian Artist (ARIA) | 9 |
| Australia Hip Hop/R&B (ARIA) | 28 |
| Estonia Airplay (TopHit) | 55 |
| Chart (2025) | Position |
| Australian Artist (ARIA) | 35 |
| Australia Hip Hop/R&B (ARIA) | 46 |

== Certifications ==
Certifications for "Girls"
| Region | Certification | Certified units/sales |
|---|---|---|
| Australia (ARIA) | 3× Platinum | 210,000^{‡} |
| Canada (Music Canada) | Platinum | 80,000^{‡} |
| Hungary (MAHASZ) | Gold | 2,000^{‡} |
| New Zealand (RMNZ) | Platinum | 30,000^{‡} |
| United Kingdom (BPI) | Silver | 200,000^{‡} |
| United States (RIAA) | Gold | 500,000^{‡} |
^{‡} Sales+streaming figures based on certification alone.

== Release history ==
Release dates and formats for "Girls"
| Region | Date | Format(s) | Version(s) | Label | Ref. |
|---|---|---|---|---|---|
| Various | 28 June 2024 | Digital download; streaming | Original | Columbia | |
| Italy | 12 July 2024 | Radio airplay | Original | Sony | |
| United States | 14 July 2026 | Contemporary hit radio | Kehlani remix | Columbia | |
