= Love Again (The Kid Laroi song) =

Single by the Kid Laroi

from the album The First Time
- Released: 27 January 2023
- Length: 2:26
- Label: Columbia
- Songwriters: Charlton Howard; Billy Walsh; Henry Walter; Omer Fedi
- Producers: Cirkut; Omer Fedi

The Kid Laroi singles chronology
"Paris to Tokyo" (2022)	"Love Again" (2023)	"Kids Are Growing Up (Part 1)" (2023)

Music video
- "Love Again" on YouTube

"Love Again" is a song by Australian rapper and singer the Kid Laroi. It was released on 27 January 2023 through Columbia Records as the lead single from his debut studio album, The First Time (2023). The song was written by Laroi alongside Billy Walsh and producers Cirkut and Omer Fedi.

At the 2023 ARIA Music Awards, the song was nominated for Song of the Year and earned Laroi a nomination for Best Solo Artist.

At the APRA Music Awards of 2024, the song was nominated for Most Performed Australian Work and Most Performed Pop Work.

== Background and promotion ==
"Love Again" was one of Laroi's unreleased songs that had been circulating on social media the year before. He first unveiled and performed the song at the 2022 iHeartRadio Jingle Ball. The release date was revealed at the end of the music video for the promotional single, "I Can't Go Back to the Way It Was (Intro)". The song was featured in Laroi's 'Wild Dreams' Fortnite experience as part of his partnership with Epic Games.

== Composition and lyrics ==
On "Love Again", Laroi mourns what once was a past love, and questions whether or not it will ever return, singing over a soft, acoustic guitar and fuzzed out instrumentation. He sings in the chorus, "Can we find love again?/ Is this time the end?/ Tell me." Billboard's Jason Lipshutz wrote that the song "recalls the raw acoustic nerve" of Laroi's breakout hit, "Without You", and "offers clipped, unflinching rhetorical questions while trying to find resolution in a relationship".

== Commercial performance ==
In Laroi's native Australia, "Love Again" debuted at number 14 on the ARIA Singles Chart. The following week, the song climbed to number six, marking his sixth top-10 hit on the chart. It entered the UK Singles Chart at number 18 before rising to number 16 a week later.

== Music video ==
The official music video for "Love Again", directed by Adrian Villagomez, premiered with the single's release on 27 January 2023. It sees Laroi in a toxic relationship with Londond0ll, a life-size blond doll that Laroi followed on Instagram earlier in the week. The two are seen driving around together, cuddling on the beach, and getting into arguments before rekindling their love at the end of the video.

== Credits and personnel ==
Credits adapted from Tidal.

- The Kid Laroi – vocals, songwriting
- Cirkut – production, songwriting, programming, recording, synthesiser, vocal production
- Omer Fedi – production, songwriting, bass, guitar, programming, synthesiser, vocal production
- Billy Walsh – songwriting
- Șerban Ghenea – mixing

== Charts ==
=== Weekly charts ===
Weekly chart performance for "Love Again"
Chart (2023)	Peak position
Australia (ARIA)	6
Australia Hip Hop/R&B (ARIA)	4
Austria (Ö3 Austria Top 40)	41
Belgium (Ultratop 50 Flanders)	40
Canada Hot 100 (Billboard)	17
Canada CHR/Top 40 (Billboard)	23
Canada Hot AC (Billboard)	22
Czech Republic Airplay (ČNS IFPI)	17
Denmark (Tracklisten)	24
Finland Airplay (Radiosoittolista)	44
Germany (GfK)	49
Global 200 (Billboard)	28
Greece International (IFPI)	64
Iceland (Tónlistinn)	26
Ireland (IRMA)	22
Japan Hot Overseas (Billboard Japan)	14
Lithuania (AGATA)	61
Netherlands (Dutch Top 40)	23
Netherlands (Single Top 100)	61
New Zealand (Recorded Music NZ)	17
Norway (VG-lista)	18
Portugal (AFP)	85
Slovakia Airplay (ČNS IFPI)	85
Slovakia Singles Digital (ČNS IFPI)	67
Sweden (Sverigetopplistan)	33
Switzerland (Schweizer Hitparade)	69
UK Singles (Official Charts)	16
US Billboard Hot 100	40
US Adult Contemporary (Billboard)	28
US Adult Pop Airplay (Billboard)	11
US Pop Airplay (Billboard)	16
US Rhythmic Airplay (Billboard)	26

=== Year-end charts ===
Year-end chart performance for "Love Again"
Chart (2023)	Position
Australian Artist (ARIA)	10
Australia Hip Hop/R&B (ARIA)	42
US Adult Top 40 (Billboard)	50

== Certifications ==
Certifications for "Love Again"
Region	Certification	Certified units/sales
Australia (ARIA)	Platinum	70,000^{‡}
Brazil (Pro-Música Brasil)	Gold	20,000^{‡}
Canada (Music Canada)	Platinum	80,000^{‡}
New Zealand (RMNZ)	Gold	15,000^{‡}
United Kingdom (BPI)	Silver	200,000^{‡}
United States (RIAA)	Platinum	1,000,000^{‡}
^{‡} Sales+streaming figures based on certification alone.

== Release history ==
Release dates and formats for "Love Again"
Region	Date	Format(s)	Label	Ref.
Various	27 January 2023	Digital download; streaming	Columbia	
United States	6 February 2023	Adult contemporary radio	Columbia	
United States	7 February 2023	Contemporary hit radio	Columbia	
Italy	24 February 2023	Radio airplay	Sony	
