= Thousand Miles (The Kid Laroi song) =

Single by the Kid Laroi
- Released: 22 April 2022
- Genre: Emo pop; trap
- Length: 2:44
- Label: Columbia
- Songwriters: Charlton Howard; Andrew Wotman; Louis Bell; Billy Walsh
- Producers: Andrew Watt; Louis Bell

The Kid Laroi singles chronology
"Stay" (2021)	"Thousand Miles" (2022)	"Paris to Tokyo" (2022)

Audio sample
- file; help

Music video
- "Thousand Miles" on YouTube

"Thousand Miles" (stylized in all-caps) is a song by Australian rapper and singer the Kid Laroi. It was released as a single through Columbia Records on 22 April 2022 and included on the deluxe edition of his debut studio album, The First Time (2024). The song was written by Laroi alongside Billy Walsh and producers Andrew Watt and Louis Bell. "Thousand Miles" is an acoustically driven midtempo emo pop ballad that blends guitar strumming and trap beats.

At the 2022 ARIA Music Awards, the song earned the Kid Laroi a nomination for Best Solo Artist. The song was nominated for Best Pop Release and Song of the Year, winning the former.

At the APRA Music Awards of 2023, the song was shortlisted for Song of the Year.

== Background and promotion ==
Snippets of "Thousand Miles" had been floating around since 2021, but it was not until the following year where it received a proper release. Laroi teased and deleted lyrics to the song, and performed it at his live shows. On 13 April 2022, Laroi announced the release date for the song with a link to pre-save the single. Subsequently, the artist posted a 10-second TikTok video of himself playing a snippet of the song, encouraging fans to share their own "last mistake" while using the sound before photos of his former manager Scooter Braun flash across the screen. The clip had amassed over 50,000 likes within two hours of its posting. On 19 April 2022, Laroi took to social media to post a six-second clip of him sitting at a bench before a piano unexpectedly falls onto him. The video then cuts to black and displays the single's release date.

== Accolades ==
Awards and nominations for "Thousand Miles"
Year	Organization	Award	Result	Ref.
2022	ARIA Music Awards	Best Solo Artist	Nominated	
2022	ARIA Music Awards	Best Pop Release	Won	
2022	ARIA Music Awards	Song of the Year	Nominated	

== Commercial performance ==
In Australia, "Thousand Miles" debuted at number four on the ARIA Singles Chart, making it Laroi's fifth top-ten entry. It entered the US Billboard Hot 100 at number 15, becoming his fourth top-20 hit and highest debut as a solo artist.

== Music video ==
The official music video premiered to YouTube on 22 April 2022, the same day the song was released. The theatrical-leaning clip was directed by Christian Breslauer, who has also directed music videos for Charlie Puth and Lil Nas X. It features appearances from TikTok influencer, Katarina Deme, Laroi's then-girlfriend.

It begins with Deme as a barista with Laroi buying a coffee. The rest of the video depicts Laroi, dressed in white, being tortured multiple times by his evil self, dressed in red. Eventually, Laroi gets hit by a train, with his evil self performing surgery on him after. He then steals his girlfriend in which she pushes bandaged Laroi away in a wheelchair and he ironically gets hit again, this time by an ambulance van.

An American indie artist, Oliver Tree, posted an Instagram video showing how many of the music video's shots were taken from multiple of his own self-directed music videos.

== Credits and personnel ==
Credits adapted from Tidal.

- The Kid Laroi – vocals, songwriting
- Andrew Watt – production, songwriting, guitar
- Louis Bell – production, songwriting, keyboards, programming, vocal engineering
- Billy Walsh – songwriting
- Anthony Vilchis – assistant engineering
- Trey Station – assistant engineering
- Zach Pereyra – assistant engineering
- Paul Lamalfa – engineering
- Randy Merrill – mastering
- Manny Marroquin – mixing

== Charts ==
=== Weekly charts ===
Weekly chart performance for "Thousand Miles"
Chart (2022–2023)	Peak position
Australia (ARIA)	4
Australia Hip Hop/R&B (ARIA)	2
Austria (Ö3 Austria Top 40)	42
Canada Hot 100 (Billboard)	11
Canada CHR/Top 40 (Billboard)	14
Canada Hot AC (Billboard)	32
Czech Republic Airplay (ČNS IFPI)	10
Czech Republic Singles Digital (ČNS IFPI)	80
Denmark (Tracklisten)	19
Finland Airplay (Radiosoittolista)	23
France (SNEP)	172
Germany (GfK)	71
Global 200 (Billboard)	14
Greece International (IFPI)	56
Hungary (Stream Top 40)	35
Iceland (Tónlistinn)	16
Ireland (IRMA)	19
Lebanon (OLT20)	16
Lithuania (AGATA)	47
Netherlands (Dutch Top 40)	19
Netherlands (Single Top 100)	29
New Zealand (Recorded Music NZ)	6
Norway (VG-lista)	13
Portugal (AFP)	69
Slovakia (Singles Digitál Top 100)	61
South Africa Streaming (TOSAC)	37
Sweden (Sverigetopplistan)	14
Switzerland (Schweizer Hitparade)	35
UK Singles (Official Charts)	21
US Billboard Hot 100	15
US Adult Pop Airplay (Billboard)	15
US Dance Airplay (Billboard)	21
US Pop Airplay (Billboard)	8
US Rhythmic Airplay (Billboard)	17

=== Year-end charts ===
2022 year-end chart performance for "Thousand Miles"
Chart (2022)	Position
Australia (ARIA)	31
Australia Hip Hop/R&B (ARIA)	9
Canada (Canadian Hot 100)	64
US Adult Top 40 (Billboard)	46
US Mainstream Top 40 (Billboard)	33

== Certifications ==
Certifications for "Thousand Miles"
Region	Certification	Certified units/sales
Australia (ARIA)	2× Platinum	140,000^{‡}
Brazil (Pro-Música Brasil)	Gold	20,000^{‡}
Canada (Music Canada)	2× Platinum	160,000^{‡}
Denmark (IFPI Danmark)	Gold	45,000^{‡}
New Zealand (RMNZ)	Platinum	30,000^{‡}
United Kingdom (BPI)	Silver	200,000^{‡}
United States (RIAA)	Platinum	1,000,000^{‡}
^{‡} Sales+streaming figures based on certification alone.

== Release history ==
Release dates and formats for "Thousand Miles"
Region	Date	Format(s)	Label	Ref.
Various	22 April 2022	Digital download; streaming	Columbia	
Italy	29 April 2022	Radio airplay	Sony	
United States	2 May 2022	Adult contemporary radio	Columbia	
United States	3 May 2022	Contemporary hit radio	Columbia	
