= The Kid Laroi =

Australian singer (born 2003)

- The Kid Laroi in 2023

Background information
- Born: Charlton Kenneth Jeffrey Howard; 17 August 2003 (age 23); Sydney, New South Wales, Australia
- Genres: Pop rap; R&B; pop
- Occupations: Singer; rapper; songwriter; record producer; actor; fashion designer
- Works: Discography
- Years active: 2016–present
- Labels: Columbia; Grade A
- Website: tkl.world thekidlaroi.com

Charlton Kenneth Jeffrey Howard (born 17 August 2003), known professionally as the Kid Laroi (stylised as The Kid LAROI), is an Australian singer, rapper, and songwriter. He was signed with American rapper Lil Bibby's Grade A Productions, in a joint venture with Columbia Records, in 2019. He is best known for his 2021 single "Stay" (with Justin Bieber), which peaked atop the charts in numerous countries including his native Australia, as well as the Canadian Hot 100 and Billboard Hot 100.

His debut mixtape, F*ck Love (2020), entered the US Billboard 200 and made him the youngest Australian solo act to peak his native country's ARIA Charts. It spawned two commercial re-issues; the first, F*ck Love: (Savage), yielded his first hit song, "Without You"—which was later remixed with American singer Miley Cyrus and peaked within the top ten songs of the Billboard Hot 100—while the second, F*ck Love: Over You (2021), yielded "Stay". His debut studio album, The First Time (2023), was supported by the singles "Love Again" and "Too Much" (with Jung Kook and Central Cee). His second album, Before I Forget (2026), peaked among the top five of both the ARIA and Billboard 200.

== Early life ==
Charlton Kenneth Jeffrey Howard was born on 17 August 2003 in Waterloo, New South Wales, in the inner south of Sydney. He has one brother, Austin Howard. His father, Nick Howard, briefly pursued a recording career and signed with executive Simon Cowell, but later shifted into production and engineering work for Australian acts such as Bardot and Delta Goodrem. His mother, Sloane Howard, was a talent manager and record executive of Aboriginal and European descent, who once managed Popstars winner Scott Cain. Howard's maternal great-great-grandfather was a part of the Kamilaroi people, who inspired his artistic name "Laroi".

His interest in hip hop music began at an early age when his mother played music around the house from artists like Fugees, 2Pac, Lil Wayne and Kanye West. He later praised West and called his 2008 album 808s & Heartbreak "his favourite of all time". Howard's parents separated when he was four, and at the age of seven he moved to the rural town of Broken Hill, New South Wales together with his mother, brother, grandparents and stepfather. Howard's father was not a consistent force in his life and his stepfather became his father figure as a result. He attended a private school, Sacred Heart Parish School, where he was a house captain and won a speaking award.

After leaving Broken Hill, Howard attended another private school, Sacred Heart College in Adelaide, until they moved back to Sydney in 2017, because Howard was bullied and his mother could not afford the college anymore. In Sydney, Howard attended the Australian Performing Arts Grammar School on a scholarship, but he dropped out midway through year nine to pursue his international career. During this period, his family lived in a Housing Commission building in Redfern.

In 2019, hip-hop podcast I-Heart Radio filmed a documentary about Howard and his friends in Redfern where they describe the area as a "ghetto". Howard detailed his work at building international relationships by waiting outside hotel rooms for popular international artists and find different ways to meet them or get backstage. His efforts paid off when he sent a friend to play his music to Swae Lee in a hotel, which resulted in him meeting Lee and later collaborating with him. His motivation to succeed came from desire to break the cycle of hardship that is common in his community and urge to help his mother through their tough financial situation, so he found a part-time job at a fruit store.

== Career ==
=== Early years ===
Howard started out recording raps over beats on his mother's phone and uploading them to SoundCloud. In an interview with Triple J, Howard stated that the first rap name he gave himself was "FC6". In 2015, Howard formed the duo "Dream$Team" with Adelaide rapper DJ Marcus Jr. (aka LadyKiller) who became his mentor and promoter as the two recorded songs together and performed to local audiences.

Howard met his future collaborator, producer Khaled Rohaim, at a recording studio in Sydney. Moved by Howard's talent and difficult living situation, Rohaim picked Howard up so they could eat together and record at his rented studio in North Strathfield. Rohaim gave Howard some work writing songs for other artists. In one instance, he wrote a song that featured A Boogie and Howard snuck into the studio so he could meet him, eventually recording a song together.

In 2017, Howard signed a development deal with Sony Music Australia. In the same year he was a co-host at the Fernside Festival hosted by Weave Youth and Community Services.

=== 2018–2019: 14 with a Dream ===
On 16 August 2018, the day before his 15th birthday, Howard released his debut EP 14 with a Dream, featuring his collaborations with Manu Crooks, B Wise and Miracle. The same month he garnered attention for finishing top five in the Triple J Unearthed High competition with his entry, "Disconnect", submitted just hours before the competition's deadline. In the same year he performed several concerts including his duet with Manu Crook$ at Listen Out Festival, rapping with Tkay Maidza at Triple J's One Night Stand Festival, played at Newtown Festival and supported THEY. He collaborated on a song with Lil Skies who posted a snippet of it on his Instargram. Howard was interviewed by community station FBi Radio, where he expressed his drive and confidence to one day be seen as a peer amongst his idols. When he was asked to name three Australian acts who he thought were going to be future legends, he stated: "I'd have to say... Can it be me? Can I pick myself? I hate to be that guy, but I definitely hope that I'm a legend."

In March 2019, Howard did an in-store meet-and-greet for streetwear brand Street X in Darlinghurst, performing alongside Triple One. In the same year he signed with American rapper Lil Bibby's record label Grade A Productions and Columbia Records. Howard was mentored by American rapper Juice Wrld while Howard supported him on his Australian national tours in 2018 and 2019. Howard lived with Juice Wrld in Los Angeles to learn more about the studio and recording process. He performed at Rolling Loud Festivals in Miami and New York.

=== 2020–2022: F*ck Love, mainstream success with "Stay" and End of the World Tour ===
On 31 January 2020, Howard released "Diva" featuring Lil Tecca which was accompanied by a Lyrical Lemonade music video directed by Cole Bennett that was released on 1 February. On 22 March, he released "Addison Rae", a song named after the social media personality star of the same name. On 27 March, Howard made a cameo appearance in Lil Mosey's music video for "Blueberry Faygo". On 17 April, he released "Fade Away" with Lil Tjay. On 25 April, he was featured on "Go Dumb" by record producer Y2K also featuring Blackbear, and Bankrol Hayden. On 12 June, he released "Go" featuring Juice Wrld, which was accompanied by a music video directed by Steve Cannon. On 26 June, Howard was featured on Bankrol Hayden's debut studio album Pain Is Temporary, on a remix of "Costa Rica". On 18 July, he released "Tell Me Why", a tribute track to Juice Wrld. Howard revealed the cover art and release date of his mixtape on Twitter the same day. The mixtape was released on 24 July and contains features from Lil Mosey, Corbin, and Juice Wrld. The same day, he released the music video for "Not Fair" featuring Corbin. On 7 August, he released the music video for the song "Selfish". On 28 August, Howard was featured on Internet Money's collective mixtape B4 the Storm on the song "Speak". It was followed by a music video for the song "Wrong" released on 18 September, which was directed by Logan Paul, featured Lil Mosey and starred ex-pornstar Lana Rhoades. On 23 October, Howard released his first single "So Done" from his next project, accompanied by a Lyrical Lemonade music video directed by Cole Bennett. On 30 October, Howard was featured on "My City" by Onefour.

On 2 November, Howard revealed on Instagram the next project's title to be Savage and set for release as a deluxe edition of F*ck Love. It was released four days later on 6 November and peaked at number one on the Australian ARIA charts, as well as at number 3 on the US Billboard 200. The same day, the music video for "Always Do" directed by Steve Cannon was released. On 26 November, the music video for "Maybe" was released. On 17 December, Howard released the music video for "Without You", directed by Steve Cannon. On 8 December, he was featured on "Reminds Me Of You", a posthumous song by Juice Wrld. The song samples Kim Petras' song "Reminds Me". On 29 December, he released the music video for "Tragic" featuring YoungBoy Never Broke Again and Internet Money, and directed by Steve Cannon.

On 19 March 2021, Howard was featured on one of Justin Bieber's songs, "Unstable", from Bieber's sixth studio album Justice. On 30 April, Howard released a remix of "Without You", a collaboration with American singer Miley Cyrus. The song, which had already garnered popularity on TikTok, went on to peak at number 8 on the Billboard Hot 100, becoming Howard's first top-ten single as a lead artist. On 8 May, he performed the song in the first musical set with Miley Cyrus on the Saturday Night Live Mothers' Day episode hosted by Elon Musk, with Miley Cyrus as the musical guest. In June 2021, he left Grade A Productions and signed a management deal with Scooter Braun. On 9 July, Howard released the song "Stay", a collaboration with Bieber. The song was accompanied by a music video, and peaked at number 1 on the Hot 100, becoming Howard's highest-charting single in the United States. The song was announced about a week prior to its release. The second deluxe of F*ck Love titled F*ck Love 3: Over You was released on 23 July. The deluxe featured guest appearances from Polo G, Stunna Gambino, G Herbo, and Lil Durk. It was accompanied by an extended version, titled F*ck Love 3+: Over You, which was released on 27 July with additional six songs. As a result, the F*ck Love project reached number one on the Billboard 200 over one year after its initial release. Howard and Bieber performed "Stay" at the 2021 VMA awards and was nominated for Best New Artist and Push Performance of the Year, for "Without You". In September 2021, Howard left SB Projects and signed with Adam Leber at Rebel Management. On 24 November 2021, Howard won Best Artist and Best Pop Release at the 2021 ARIA Music Awards, performing "Stay" to close out the awards show.

On 22 January 2022, "Stay" was voted second in Triple J's 2021 Hottest 100, making him the highest ranking Indigenous artist ever in the annual event. On 22 April, Howard released his first song since "Stay" titled "Thousand Miles", which premiered alongside a music video. The music video reached 1 million views in about a day. In May 2022, Howard exited Adam Leber's Rebel Management and re-signed with Scooter Braun. The same month, Howard returned to Sydney, Australia for the first time since he moved to Los Angeles, United States in 2019, to perform his debut headlining concert tour titled the End of the World Tour, in support of his mixtape, F*ck Love. After Howard fell ill before his Melbourne show at Rod Laver Arena on 3 June, his shows were postponed at late notice and Howard issued an apology to fans while they were rescheduled. On 8 July, Howard and American rapper Fivio Foreign released "Paris to Tokyo" alongside a music video. On 22 July, he was featured on Nardo Wick's song "Burning Up" from the latter's debut studio album, Who Is Nardo Wick?. In December, he performed at iHeartRadio's 2022 Jingle Ball.

=== 2023–2024: The First Time and Kids Are Growing Up ===
On 12 January 2023, Howard posted a short trailer on YouTube for his debut studio album, The First Time. The album is supported by the singles "I Can't Go Back to the Way It Was (Intro)", "Love Again", and "Kids Are Growing Up (Part 1)". On 27 January, Howard hosted a Fortnite concert titled "Wildest Dreams". In February, Howard announced his second headlining tour, titled Bleed for You, that began on 22 March in Syracuse, New York. On 27 February 2023, Howard released a song dedicated to Valentine's Day "I Guess It's Love?" alongside a music video featuring his girlfriend Katarina Deme. The end of the video revealed the album's final song title, "What Just Happened", and revealed the album's tentative release date.

In March 2023, Howard was cast to make his acting debut in the A24 film Y2K. On 21 April 2023, alongside Post Malone, Howard appeared on "What You Say", the twenty-fourth cut of YoungBoy Never Broke Again's sixth full-length studio album, Don't Try This at Home. Howard performed at the 22nd Coachella Valley Music and Arts Festival in April 2023. He recorded a song, "Forever & Again" for the soundtrack album accompanying the 2023 film Barbie.

In October 2023, Howard released the single "Too Much" with South Korean singer Jung Kook and British rapper Central Cee. The First Time was released the following month. The album peaked at number three on the ARIA charts and 23 on the Billboard 200, and met with mixed critical reception. The album contained guest appearances from YoungBoy Never Broke Again, Future and D4vd.

In February 2024, Howard announced a documentary about himself titled Kids Are Growing Up: A Story About A Kid Named Laroi. The film features Howard talking about his struggles in the music industry and honoring his late mentor Juice Wrld. It also showcases parts of Howard's personal life. The film was released on 29 February 2024.

He released the single "Girls" in June 2024. In November 2024, Howard took his The First Time tour to Australia and opened with a sold-out Gold Coast concert at HOTA. The second leg of his Australian tour attracted a large audience at the Brisbane Entertainment Centre, where he paid tribute to his late mentor Juice Wrld. He also performed in Sydney, Perth, Adelaide, Hobart and Melbourne before returning to the US in December.

=== 2025–present: Scrapped album and Before I Forget ===
On 6 June 2025, Howard released "All I Want Is You," the lead single to his album that was originally rumored to be titled "Watch This!", until The Kid LAROI gave us the original title for the scrapped album, and the title was actually "LOVE LIKE MINE". This release was soon followed by "How Does It Feel?" on 20 June 2025 and "Hot Girl Problems". With his August release, "She Don't Need to Know", he announced the Watch This! cancellation stating, "I didn't feel comfortable releasing it." To replace it, Howard recorded Before I Forget, an album largely driven by his July breakup with girlfriend Tate McRae in the three months following their split, and knowing "exactly what he wanted to say and how he felt". Shortly after, Howard released "A Cold Play" after it leaked the previous month before.

On 9 November 2025, Howard performed at the Olympiastadion in Berlin for the NFL International Series halftime show. Two weeks after the halftime show, Howard announced on social media his new album Before I Forget, scheduled for 9 January 2026. The same day the album was announced the second lead single "A PERFECT WORLD" was released.

On 22 December 2025, the first "Before I Forget" Twitch stream was announced, three more followed with the fifth stream being a release party for the album. "Before I Forget" released on 9 January 2026, debuted at number 6 on the Billboard 200 and selling 41 thousand units. On 17 February 2026, "A Perfect World Tour" was announced with 36 tour dates across the United States, UK and Europe. Tommy Richman was announced to be the supporting act for the US leg of the tour.

On 11 April 2026, Howard made a surprise appearance at Justin Bieber's Coachella concert, performing their song "Stay". Following his performance, he release the first single from the deluxe version to Before I Forget titled "I CONDEMN". Before I Forget (Deluxe) was officially announced on 21 April 2026 and was released on 24 April 2026.

== Other ventures ==
In May 2022, Howard collaborated with McDonald's in Australia to launch his own McDonald's meal, consisting of six chicken nuggets, medium fries, a cheeseburger with no pickles, barbecue sauce, and a frozen Coca-Cola. The same month, Howard donated $100,000 to a youth service he attended when he was younger in the Sydney suburb of Waterloo.

In early 2023, Howard held a virtual concert event in Fortnite called "The Kid LAROI's Wild Dreams". The event included an interactive island experience, new music from him, and the debut of his song "Love Again". Players could also unlock special cosmetic items, including two character outfits, back blings, pickaxes, emotes, and a wrap.

The LAROI Foundation was established in May 2024. According to the Australian Charities and Not-For-Profit Commission, the charity was registered on 30 May 2024. The foundation was founded by The Kid LAROI to "positively impact children everywhere".

== Persona and reception ==
Howard's fashion reflects his transformation from Redfern resident to international musician. Howard explained to Spout Podcast that in Australia he apparently did not have a lot of money and was wearing a lot of sport tracksuits, but since moving to California, Howard's style has switched to high end designers such as Celine, Louis Vuitton, Comme des Garçons and is known for his love of knitted jumpers. Howard was featured in the style editorial magazine Flaunt and appeared on the cover of Wonderland magazine in Autumn 2021. By 2025 Howard discussed his change in personal style, noting that he had moved past a phase of buying designer clothes with prominent logos and now focused on what fits him well.

Howard's accent and heavy use of American colloquial terms has received attention, as he has been living there only since 2019. In an interview with Zach Sang, he explained that he has many friends from Chicago and that, to make himself understood, he often adapts phrases as they do not understand many Australian words.

== Personal life ==
As of 2020, Howard lived in Los Angeles with his mother and younger brother. Howard dated TikTok influencer Katarina Deme from 2020 to 2023. He has stated that his breakup with Deme directly inspired tracks from The First Time. In April 2024, Howard confirmed he was in a relationship with Canadian singer Tate McRae. They collaborated on the song "I Know Love" from her 2025 album So Close to What. The couple broke up in July 2025.

Howard sees himself as an ambassador for Australia and wants to facilitate development of Australian music. He is a supporter of the South Sydney Rabbitohs club playing in the National Rugby League, based out of suburb of Redfern where he spent part of his childhood.

== Discography ==
Studio albums

- The First Time (2023)
- Before I Forget (2026)

== Filmography ==
=== Film ===
Year	Title	Role	Notes
2021	Juice Wrld: Into the Abyss	Himself	Documentary
2023	ONEFOUR: Against All Odds	Himself	Documentary
2024	Kids Are Growing Up: A Story About a Kid Named Laroi	Himself	Documentary
2024	Y2K	Soccer Chris	Film Debut

=== Video game ===
Year	Title	Role	Notes
2023	Fortnite	Himself	In-game cosmetic

== Tours ==
=== Headlining ===
- The End of the World Tour (2022)
- Bleed For You College Tour (2023) (US only)
- The First Time World Tour (2024)
- A Perfect World Tour (2026)
