= Lil Bibby =

American rapper (born 1994)

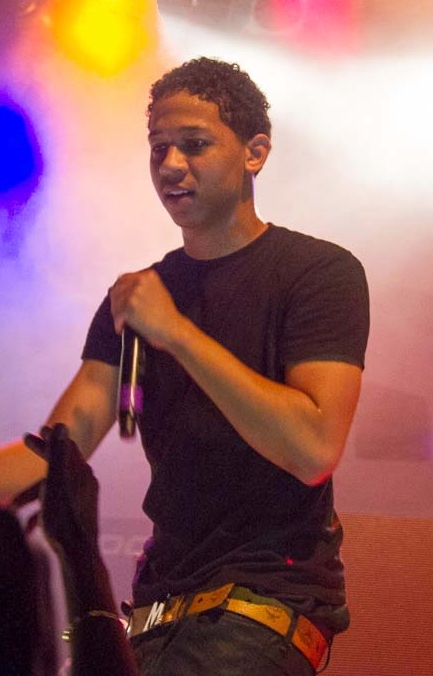
- Lil Bibby performing in 2014

Background information
- Born: Brandon George Dickinson; July 18, 1994 (age 32); Chicago, Illinois, U.S.
- Genres: Midwestern hip-hop; drill; trap; R&B
- Occupations: Rapper; singer; songwriter; record executive; audio engineer
- Years active: 2011–present
- Labels: Grade A; RCA; Kemosabe

Brandon George Dickinson (born July 18, 1994), better known by his stage name Lil Bibby, is an American rapper, singer, and record executive. Beginning his career in 2011, Bibby released his debut mixtape, Free Crack in 2013. It was followed by two sequels—Free Crack 2 (2014) and Free Crack 3 (2015)—until he signed with Dr. Luke's Kemosabe Records, an imprint of RCA Records; however, he released no studio albums under the label.

By 2017, he founded and shifted focus onto expanding his record label, Grade A Productions. The label has signed commercially successful acts such as fellow Chicago native, late rapper and singer Juice WRLD, as well as Australian rapper and singer the Kid Laroi.

== Personal life ==
He was raised by a single mother who battled drug addiction, and he has two brothers, George (also known as “G-Money”) and Shawn.

In 2015, Lil Bibby received his high school diploma. Initially, he had opted for a GED and after completing the necessary coursework (with straight A's), he decided to re-enroll in high school. His alma mater was from Chicago's Liberty High School. A year later, after several universities had offered him scholarships, Bibby considered studying Computer Engineering at a university, although he ultimately decided against this.

In December 2022, Dickinson acquired an ultra-modern home in Los Angeles for US$7.9 million.

== Career ==
=== 2011–2013: Career beginnings and debut mixtape ===
In 2013, Lil Bibby released his debut mixtape, Free Crack. He stated that his favorite rappers were Drake and Jadakiss, and the influence of both rappers was apparent in the project, according to Vice Magazine. The mixtape features guest appearances from fellow Chicagoans Lil Herb and King L, while production was handled by Hit-Boy, Young Chop and The Olympicks, among others. Hosted by DJ Scream, the tape combines his distinctive gruff and imposing voice with a solid delivery and flow. Music videos were released for the songs "How We Move" (featuring King L), "Change", "Water" and "Tired of Talkin'".

=== 2013–2015: 2014's Freshman Class, Free Crack 2 and Free Crack 3 ===
In December 2013, in an interview with XXL, Bibby hinted that the next step for his career could be an EP. In 2014, it was also stated, that the rapper Drake was a huge fan of Bibby and that they'd spoken in 2013, before the release of Bibby's debut mixtape. Bibby said it pushed him onto improve his debut release, adding the tracks "Water" and "Whole Crew".

In January 2014, Bibby appeared on Sway's radio show Sway in the Morning. On the show he spoke about the success of his debut mixtape, and also dropped a live freestyle. During the same month, Bibby also featured on New York's radio station, Hot 97. During the same month, Bibby stated in his interview with Billboard, that he was working on material for an EP, but was waiting on a couple of features. Bibby also appeared on the list of 2014's XXL Freshman Class. He was the last person selected to the list, due to Young Thug's last minute cancellation.

In August 2014, he guest featured alongside Young Thug and Nicki Minaj on Juicy J's single "Low," and was later featured on the remix of Kid Ink's "Main Chick." After a few delays, Bibby's sophomore mixtape, Free Crack 2, was released on August 29, 2014. Hosted by DJ Drama, includes guest appearances from Lil Herb, Wiz Khalifa, Juicy J, Kevin Gates, Jadakiss and Anthony Hamilton, among others. The mixtape has production from Juicy J, Honorable C.N.O.T.E., Sonny Digital and DJ Pain 1, among others. It was released for free digital download and rapidly accumulated over 120,000 downloads.

Free Crack 2 was received with critical acclaim. XXL magazine awarded the mixtape an XL, praising the mixtape's authenticity, catchy hooks and production, while also commenting that the mixtape showcases Bibby's "growth as an artist." RedEye awarded the mixtape three stars out of four, commenting on the tape's maturity and versatility and praising the ability of the song 'Dead or in Prison' to let Bibby's "emotion and natural charisma do the heavy lifting." BET gave the mixtape a positive review, awarding it five stars while commenting on its "new level of depth and introspection, detailing the difficult balance of fame and authenticity and how that effects everyday life in some of America's urban war zones."

=== 2015–2016: FC3 the Epilogue & Free Crack 4 ===
In 2015, Bibby released two singles "Ridah" and "Aww Man" (featuring Future) for an upcoming album, supposedly the fourth installment in his Free Crack series. Both singles failed to reach any domestic charts. In late 2016, Bibby released "Thought It Was A Drought", which was produced by DJ L Beats and Roberto Mario. After a long period without any releases, in early 2018, Bibby began using the hashtag "Free Bibby" on social media, protesting his label's refusal to allow him to release the project.

=== 2017–present: Grade A Productions, Juice Wrld, and The Kid Laroi ===
In 2017, Bibby and his brother George "G-Money" launched the record label Grade A Productions. In an interview with XXL, Bibby discussed his transition from being a rapper to starting a record label:

"I really don't know. I like to make people a lot of money. I got enough knowledge and I've studied this rap stuff and I got enough relationships to help an artist, help his family [and] I get a kick out of it 'cause I see how the label does it and my situation. I feel like just helping people."

That same year, the two discovered then-upcoming fellow Chicago rapper Juice Wrld, after hearing his song "Lucid Dreams". Under the label, Juice Wrld released his debut studio album Goodbye and Good Riddance on May 23, 2018, which included the hit singles "All Girls Are the Same", the aforementioned "Lucid Dreams", and "Lean Wit Me". In March 2019, Juice Wrld released his second studio album Death Race for Love, which included two hit singles: "Robbery" and "Hear Me Calling".

In 2019, Bibby discovered upcoming Australian rapper and singer The Kid Laroi, after hearing his song "Blessings" from his debut EP 14 With A Dream. In March of that year, Bibby signed Laroi to Grade A. Under the label, Laroi released his debut mixtape F*CK LOVE in July 2020, spawning two singles: "Go" featuring labelmate Juice Wrld (a posthumous verse due to his death in December 2019), and "TELL ME WHY". On November 6, Laroi released a deluxe edition of F*ck Love titled F*ck Love (Savage) which was followed by the single "SO DONE".

On December 8, 2019, Juice Wrld suffered from an overdose at an airport in Chicago which led to his unexpected death. On January 22, 2020, Grade A announced that posthumous projects from Juice Wrld will be released to honor his legacy. His first posthumous album Legends Never Die was released in July of that year, which contained six singles "Righteous", "Tell Me U Luv Me" featuring Trippie Redd, "Life's A Mess" featuring Halsey, "Come and Go" featuring Marshmello, "Wishing Well", and "Smile" featuring The Weeknd. and in December 2021, it was followed up with his second posthumous album Fighting Demons. Throughout 2020, other posthumous releases from the artist included, "Real Shit" with Benny Blanco, "Reminds Me Of You" with The Kid Laroi and "Bad Boy" with Young Thug in 2021.

On May 27, 2021, Bibby announced Juice Wrld's third posthumous album, The Party Never Ends. On September 9, 2024, it was officially announced, with The Pre-Party EP. The Pre-Party consists of two songs, with an extended version of the EP, The Pre-Party (Extended), releasing on October 14, 2024. The album's supposed lead single, "Lace It" (with Benny Blanco and Eminem) was released in December 2023.

On November 29, 2024, after several delays, Grade A released Juice Wrld's fifth and final album, The Party Never Ends. Bibby crafted the album to give the listener the illusion that they were present at a Juice Wrld concert, interspersing the tracks with footage and audio from previous Juice Wrld concerts. A deluxe version of the album was set to arrive in early 2025, but was delayed. A website on which supporters could vote for the songs that are going to release on the deluxe was also set up.

== Grade A Productions ==
Logo of Grade A Productions

Grade A Productions is a record label founded by Lil Bibby and George "G-Money" Dickinson. G-Money is Bibby's older brother, while record executive and business partner Peter Jideonwo serves as Chief Creative Officer and A&R.

All signees are joint ventures between the label and various major record labels.

Act	Year signed	Releases	Notes
The Kid Laroi	2019	2 (1 extended play)	Jointly with Columbia; left Grade A's management on June 4, 2021, signing with manager Scooter Braun
Stunna Gambino	2021	1	Jointly with RCA
Zzz.	2022	1	Jointly with Warner
Rocco	2022	4 (Extended plays)	Jointly with Khalabo and Interscope
Screwly G	2024	1	Jointly with Geffen Records
Nettspend	2024	1	Jointly with Interscope

=== Former ===
==== Act ====	Year signed	Releases	Notes
Juice Wrld (deceased)	2018-2019	5 (3 posthumous)	Jointly with Interscope; died in December 2019
Clever	2019-2021	2 (1 extended play)	Jointly with Posty & Republic
Bloodhound Lil Jeff (deceased)	2023-2024	2 (2 posthumous)	Jointly with Create Music Group
Bloodhound Q50 (deceased)	2024-2026	2	Jointly with Signal Records

=== Discography ===
Year	Album details	Details
2018	Juice Wrld – Goodbye & Good Riddance: Released: December 10, 2018; Label: Grade A Productions, Interscope Records; Formats: Vinyl, Streaming, Digital download	US Chart position: 4; RIAA certification: 5× Platinum
2019	Juice Wrld – Death Race for Love: Released: March 8, 2019; Label: Grade A Productions, Interscope Records; Formats: Vinyl, CD, Streaming, Digital download	Chart position: 1; RIAA certification: 2× Platinum
2019	Clever – Who is Clever?: Released: October 11, 2019; Label: Grade A Productions, The Dispensary; Formats: Streaming, Digital download	Chart position: N/A; RIAA certification: Uncertified
2020	Seezyn – Tis: Released: January 30, 2020; Label: Kult Life Records, Grade A Productions; Formats: Streaming, Digital download	Chart position: N/A; RIAA certification: Uncertified
2020	The Kid Laroi – F*ck Love: Released: July 24, 2020; Label: Grade A Productions, Columbia Records; Formats: Vinyl, Streaming, Digital download	Chart position: 1; RIAA certification: Platinum
2020	Juice Wrld – Legends Never Die: Released: July 10, 2020; Label: Grade A Productions, Interscope Records; Formats: Vinyl, CD, Streaming, Digital download	Chart position: 1; RIAA certification: 2× Platinum
2021	Clever – Crazy: Released: March 12, 2021; Label: Grade A Productions, Republic Records; Formats: Streaming, Digital download	Chart position: 1; RIAA certification: Uncertified
2021	Juice Wrld – Fighting Demons: Released: December 10, 2021; Label: Grade A Productions, Interscope Records; Formats: Vinyl, CD, Streaming, Digital download	Chart position: 2; RIAA certification: Gold
2024	Bloodhound Lil Jeff – Stepping In Blood: Released: June 26, 2024; Label: Grade A Productions, Create Music Group; Formats: Streaming, Digital download	
2024	Juice Wrld – The Party Never Ends: Released: November 29, 2024; Label: Grade A Productions, Interscope Records; Formats: Vinyl, CD, Streaming, Digital download	Chart position: 4
2024	Nettspend – Bad Ass F*cking Kid: Released: December 6, 2024; Label: Grade A Productions, Interscope Records; Formats: Streaming, Digital download	Chart position: 197
2025	Bloodhound Lil Jeff – Bloody Bruddas: Released: January 1, 2025; Label: Grade A Productions, Create Music Group; Formats: Streaming, Digital download	
2025	Bloodhound Q50 – Long Live My Brudda He Prolly Kilt Yo Brudda: Released: April 2, 2025; Label: Grade A Productions, Signal Records; Formats: Streaming, Digital download	
2026	Nettspend - Early Life Crisis: Released: March 6, 2026; Label: Grade A Productions, Interscope Records; Format: Streaming, CD, Digital download	Chart position: 33

== Discography ==
=== Extended plays ===
List of Extended plays, with selected chart positions and sales figures
Title	Album details
Big Buckz	Released: August 22, 2016; Label: Grade A Productions; Format: Digital download
FC3: The Epilogue	Released: March 8, 2017; Label: Kemosabe Records; Format: Digital download

=== Mixtapes ===
List of mixtapes, with year released
Title	Mixtape details
Free Crack	Released: November 29, 2013; Label: Grade A Productions; Format: Digital download
Free Crack 2	Released: August 29, 2014; Label: Grade A Productions; Format: Digital download
Free Crack 3	Released: November 27, 2015; Label: Grade A Productions; Format: Digital download

=== Singles ===
==== As lead artist ====
List of singles, with selected chart positions, showing year released and album name
Title	Year	Album
"Know That"	2013	Non-album singles
"For The Low"	2013	Non-album singles
"Doin Hits"	2013	Non-album singles
"How We Move" (featuring King L)	2013	Free Crack
"Stressin'"	2013	Free Crack
"Tired of Talkin"	2014	Free Crack
"Dead or in Prison"	2014	Free Crack 2
"Sumn" (featuring Blac Youngsta)	2017	Non-album singles
"Complicated" (featuring Ann Marie)	2017	Non-album singles

==== As featured artist ====
List of singles as featured performer, with selected chart positions, showing year released and album name
Title	Year	Peak chart positions			Album
Title	Year	US R&B/HH	US R&B/HH Air.	US Main. R&B/HH	Album
"Ex Bitch" (N-Tune featuring Lil Bibby)	2013	—	—	—	Non-album singles
"Crazy" (Gianni Blu featuring King L, EMP Dasme and Lil Bibby)	2013	—	—	—	Non-album singles
"Main Chick" (Remix) (Kid Ink featuring Chris Brown, French Montana, Yo Gotti, Tyga and Lil Bibby)	2014	—	—	—	Non-album singles
"Low" (Juicy J featuring Nicki Minaj, Lil Bibby and Young Thug)	2014	44	45	29	Non-album singles
"Proud of Me Now" (A Boogie wit da Hoodie featuring Lil Bibby)	2016	—	—	—	Non-album singles
"—" denotes a title that did not chart, or was not released in that territory.

=== Guest appearances ===
List of non-single guest appearances, with other performing artists, showing year released and album name
Title	Year	Other artist(s)	Album
"Flexing Finessing"	2012	Fredo Santana, Lil Herb	It's a Scary Site
"How We Move"	2013	King L	March Madness
"Fuck for Fame"	2013	Lil Durk, Boss Top	—N/a
"Knock a Hoe"	2013	Katie Got Bandz, Dreezy, Lil Herb	Drillary Clinton
"Do It Like I Do"	2013	YP	Restless
"Kilo"	2013	Tink, Lil Herb	Boss Up
"All I Got"	2014	Lil Herb	Welcome to Fazoland
"At Night"	2014	Lil Herb	Welcome to Fazoland (No DJ Version)
"Holy Ghost"	2014	Juicy J	Pure THC: The Hustle Continues
"Love Me Freestyle"	2014	Lil Reese	We Are Chiraq Volume 1
"All I Need"	2014	Kid Ink, Shitty Montana	4B's
"Mechanical Animals"	2014	Saigon, Memphis Bleek, Kool G Rap	Greatest Story Never Told 3: The Troubled Times of Brian Carenard
"Never Changed"	2015	Yo Gotti	Concealed
"Faneto (Remix)"	2015	Chief Keef, Lil Herb, King L	—N/a
"Doin Me"	2015	Trae tha Truth, Nipsey Hussle	Tha Truth
"Mirror"	2017	G Herbo	Humble Beast
"Musty"	2017	Chief Keef, Ballout	The W
"Tommy & Ghost"	2019	The Plug, 67	Plug Talk

== Filmography ==
Year	Title	Role	Ref.
2021	Juice Wrld: Into the Abyss	Himself	
