= List of top 10 singles for 2021 in Australia =

This is a list of songs that charted in the top ten of the ARIA Charts in 2021. In 2021 twenty-two acts, Olivia Rodrigo, Glass Animals, Spacey Jane, Hvme, 6lack, Willow Sage Hart, Masked Wolf, Silk Sonic, Daniel Caesar, Giveon, Polo G, Russ Millions, Tion Wayne, Måneskin, Stunna Gambino, Lil Baby, Future, CKay, The Anxiety, Gayle, Acraze and Cherish reached the top ten for the first time.

== Top-ten singles ==
Key

Symbol	Meaning
◁	Indicates single's top 10 entry was also its ARIA top 50 debut
(#)	2021 Year-end top 10 single position and rank

List of ARIA top ten singles that peaked in 2021
Top ten entry date	Single	Artist(s)	Peak	Peak date	Weeks in top ten	Refs.
Singles from 2020
9 November	"34+35" ◁ ^{[B]}	Ariana Grande	5	25 January	2	
16 November	"Levitating" (#5) ^{[G]} ^{[I]} ^{[K]}	Dua Lipa	4	11 January	31	
14 December	"Without You" (#4) ◁ ^{[L]} ^{[N]}	The Kid Laroi with Miley Cyrus^{1}	1	10 May	29	
Singles from 2021
4 January	"Afterglow"	Ed Sheeran	7	4 January	2	
11 January	"Anyone" ◁	Justin Bieber	5	11 January	5	
11 January	"Fly Away"	Tones and I	4	8 February	6	
18 January	"Drivers License" (#3) ◁ ^{[J]}	Olivia Rodrigo	1	18 January	16	
18 January	"Good Days" ^{[C]}	SZA	7	8 February	4	
1 February	"Heat Waves" (#1) ^{[Q]}	Glass Animals	1	1 March	87	
1 February	"Booster Seat" ◁	Spacey Jane	8	1 February	1	
8 February	"The Business" (#10) ^{[I]}	Tiësto	4	15 February	14	
15 February	"Save Your Tears" (#8) ^{[H]} ^{[K]}	The Weeknd	3	21 June	18	
22 February	"Calling My Phone" ◁	Lil Tjay & 6lack	3	22 February	6	
22 February	"Goosebumps (Remix)"	Travis Scott & HVME	5	22 March	8	
8 March	"Cover Me in Sunshine"	Pink & Willow Sage Hart	6	22 March	8	
15 March	"What's Next" ◁	Drake	7	15 March	1	
22 March	"Astronaut in the Ocean"	Masked Wolf	4	12 April	17	
22 March	"Leave the Door Open"	Silk Sonic	10	22 March	1	
29 March	"Peaches" ◁	Justin Bieber featuring Daniel Caesar & Giveon	1	12 April	9	
29 March	"Hold On"	Justin Bieber	6	29 March	3	
12 April	"Montero (Call Me by Your Name)" ^{[M]} ^{[P]} ^{[S]}	Lil Nas X	1	26 April	13	
19 April	"Rapstar" ◁	Polo G	4	19 April	4	
19 April	"Kiss Me More" (#9) ◁	Doja Cat featuring SZA	2	10 May	20	
26 April	"Deja Vu" ^{[J]}	Olivia Rodrigo	3	31 May	9	
10 May	"Body"	Russ Millions and Tion Wayne	1	17 May	8	
10 May	"Your Power" ◁	Billie Eilish	9	10 May	1	
24 May	"Good 4 U" (#6) ◁ ^{[R]}	Olivia Rodrigo	1	31 May	22	
31 May	"Butter" ◁	BTS	6	31 May	1	
31 May	"Traitor" ◁ ^{[O]}	Olivia Rodrigo	5	7 June	6	
5 July	"Bad Habits" (#7) ◁	Ed Sheeran	1	5 July	44	
5 July	"Beggin'" ^{[R]}	Måneskin	3	12 July	13	
19 July	"Stay" (#2) ◁	The Kid Laroi & Justin Bieber	1	19 July	53	
19 July	"Permission to Dance" ◁	BTS	6	19 July	1	
2 August	"Industry Baby" ◁ ^{[R]}	Lil Nas X & Jack Harlow	4	27 September	31	
2 August	"Not Sober" ◁	The Kid Laroi featuring Polo G & Stunna Gambino	8	2 August	1	
9 August	"Happier Than Ever" ◁ ^{[T]}	Billie Eilish	3	16 August	8	
16 August	"Take My Breath" ◁	The Weeknd	9	16 August	1	
16 August	"Need to Know"	Doja Cat	9	23 August	3	
23 August	"Cold Heart (Pnau remix)" ◁	Elton John & Dua Lipa	1	8 November	40	
30 August	"Visiting Hours" ◁	Ed Sheeran	3	30 August	1	
6 September	"Hurricane" ◁	Kanye West	4	6 September	2	
6 September	"Jail" ◁	Kanye West	5	6 September	1	
6 September	"Off the Grid" ◁	Kanye West	9	6 September	1	
13 September	"Girls Want Girls" ◁	Drake featuring Lil Baby	2	13 September	2	
13 September	"Fair Trade" ◁	Drake featuring Travis Scott	3	13 September	2	
13 September	"Champagne Poetry" ◁	Drake	6	13 September	1	
13 September	"Way 2 Sexy" ◁	Drake featuring Future & Young Thug	7	13 September	1	
13 September	"Papi's Home" ◁	Drake	8	13 September	1	
20 September	"Shivers" ◁	Ed Sheeran	2	8 November	34	
27 September	"Thats What I Want" ◁	Lil Nas X	7	27 September	15	
4 October	"My Universe" ◁	Coldplay & BTS	7	4 October	1	
11 October	"Love Nwantiti"	CKay	8	11 October	3	
25 October	"Easy On Me" ◁	Adele	1	25 October	15	
1 November	"Moth to a Flame" ◁	Swedish House Mafia & The Weeknd	8	1 November	1	
8 November	"Overpass Graffiti" ◁	Ed Sheeran	8	8 November	1	
8 November	"Meet Me at Our Spot"	The Anxiety	8	15 November	2	
15 November	"One Right Now" ◁	Post Malone & The Weeknd	9	15 November	2	
22 November	"All Too Well (Taylor's Version)" ◁	Taylor Swift	1	22 November	4	
22 November	"Smokin Out the Window"	Silk Sonic	8	22 November	1	
29 November	"Oh My God" ◁	Adele	6	29 November	2	
29 November	"I Drink Wine" ◁	Adele	10	29 November	1	
6 December	"abcdefu"	Gayle	2	20 December	21	

=== 2020 peaks ===
List of ARIA top ten singles in 2021 that peaked in 2020
Top ten entry date	Single	Artist(s)	Peak	Peak date	Weeks in top ten	References
23 December (2019)	"Blinding Lights" ^{[A]}	The Weeknd	1	27 January	40	
24 August	"Head & Heart" ^{[D]} ^{[F]}	Joel Corry featuring MNEK	2	26 October	26	
31 August	"Mood"	24kGoldn featuring Iann Dior	1	5 October	28	
2 November	"Positions" ◁	Ariana Grande	1	2 November	12	
16 November	"So Done" ^{[A]} ^{[E]}	The Kid Laroi	6	23 November	13	

=== 2022 peaks ===
List of ARIA top ten singles in 2021 that peaked in 2022
Top ten entry date	Single	Artist(s)	Peak	Peak date	Weeks in top ten	References
20 December	"Do It to It"	Acraze featuring Cherish	6	10 January	5	

=== Holiday season ===
Recurring holiday titles, appearing in the ARIA Top 50 top ten in previous holiday seasons
Top ten entry date	Single	Artist(s)	Peak	Peak date	Weeks in top ten	Ref.
1 January 2018	"All I Want for Christmas Is You"	Mariah Carey	1	31 December 2018	21	
31 December 2018	"Last Christmas"	Wham!	2	28 December 2020	13	
30 December 2019	"It's Beginning to Look a Lot Like Christmas"	Michael Buble	3	3 January 2022	8	

Notes:

^{1} Miley Cyrus is credited on a remix of The Kid Laroi's "Without You", with her name appearing on the song beginning with the chart dated 17 May 2021. Prior to that week, The Kid Laroi was the sole artist credit.
^{A} The singles re-entered the top 10 on 4 January 2021.
^{B} The singles re-entered the top 10 on 25 January 2021.
^{C} The singles re-entered the top 10 on 8 February 2021.
^{D} The singles re-entered the top 10 on 15 February 2021.
^{E} The singles re-entered the top 10 on 22 February 2021.
^{F} The singles re-entered the top 10 on 1 March 2021.
^{G} The singles re-entered the top 10 on 5 April 2021.
^{H} The singles re-entered the top 10 on 3 May 2021.
^{I} The singles re-entered the top 10 on 17 May 2021.
^{J} The singles re-entered the top 10 on 31 May 2021.
^{K} The singles re-entered the top 10 on 7 June 2021.
^{L} The singles re-entered the top 10 on 14 June 2021.
^{M} The singles re-entered the top 10 on 28 June 2021.
^{N} The singles re-entered the top 10 on 19 July 2021.
^{O} The singles re-entered the top 10 on 26 July 2021.
^{P} The singles re-entered the top 10 on 2 August 2021.
^{Q} The singles re-entered the top 10 on 6 September 2021.
^{R} The singles re-entered the top 10 on 20 September 2021.
^{S} The singles re-entered the top 10 on 27 September 2021.
^{T} The singles re-entered the top 10 on 11 October 2021.

== See also ==
- List of number-one singles of 2021 (Australia)
