= Free Crack =

Mixtape by Lil Bibby
- Released: November 29, 2013
- Recorded: 2013
- Genres: Hip hop, drill
- Length: 54:03
- Label: Grade A Productions
- Producers: DJ L, Honorable C.N.O.T.E., Nito, Don Robb, Hit-Boy, Rey Reel, Black Metaphor, Cannon Boyz, Young Chop, The Olympicks

Lil Bibby chronology
Free Crack (2013)	Free Crack 2 (2014)

Singles from Free Crack
- 1. "How We Move" Released: 2013; 2. "Stressin" Released: 2013; 3. "Tired Of Talkin'" Released: 2014

Free Crack is the debut mixtape of American rapper Lil Bibby and was released on November 29, 2013.

== Background ==
Lil Bibby cited that Drake and Jadakiss as two of his favorite rappers. Vice stated that the debut mixtape had clear influences from both rappers.

The mixtape features guest appearances from Lil Herb and King L, among others. The production was handled by DJ L, Hit-Boy, Black Metaphor, Young Chop and The Olympicks, among others.

== Singles ==
Free Crack was supported by three singles, "How We Move" and "Stressin" are both singles only were released in 2013, whilst "Tired of Talkin" was released in 2014.

There have been released 4 music videos of the mixtape; "How We Move" featuring King L, "Change", "Water" and "Tired of Talkin'".

== Critical reception ==
BET called the mixtape "a solid rookie effort from someone that's got skills, credibility and heart", noting that "Combining a gruff and imposing voice with crushing delivery and flows that oscillate from Down South slow to Midwest speedy (though not quite Twista fast), Bibby is one of the hottest new artists to come out of the Midwest in a minute."

Following the release of the debut mixtape, Bibby was featured in Vibe, which stated that he was one of the rappers to watch in 2014. The article complimented Bibby, stating that he had what it takes to be a major music artist, due to his maturity and his rapping ability.

== Track list ==
All tracks are wrote by Brandon Dickerson, except where noted.

No.	Title	Producer(s)	Length
1.	"Intro"		0:56
2.	"Bibby Story"	DJ L	2:19
3.	"Change"	Honorable C N.O.T.E.	3:47
4.	"Raised Up"	Nito	2:52
5.	"How We Move" (featuring King L)	DJ L	3:39
6.	"Cam Skit"		1:32
7.	"If You Know"	Willie B	2:47
8.	"Know Somethin'" (featuring Lil Herb)	DJ L	3:47
9.	"Ballin'" (featuring FlossMobChase)	Don Robb	3:17
10.	"Unlike You"	Don Robb	3:25
11.	"Whole Crew"	Hit-Boy, Rey Reel	2:48
12.	"Water"	Black Metaphor	3:15
13.	"Shout Out" (featuring Lil Herb & King L)	Cannon Boyz	5:46
14.	"Tired of Talkin'"	Young Chop	4:17
15.	"See Me Down"	The Olympicks	2:53
16.	"Stressing"	Don Robb	3:53
17.	"When The Money Came"	Donn Robb	2:50
Total length:			54:03
