= So Done =

So Done may refer to:

- "So Done" (Alicia Keys song), 2020
- "So Done" (The Kid Laroi song), 2020
- "So Done", a song by Jeannie Ortega from her 2006 album No Place Like BKLYN
