= We Are Strong =

We Are Strong may refer to:

- "We Are Strong", a song by Lil Bibby from Free Crack 2, 2014
- "We Are Strong", a song by Pitbull from Climate Change, 2017
- "We Are Strong", a song by Saxon from Destiny, 1988
