= F*ck Love =

2020 debut mixtape by The Kid Laroi

Mixtape by the Kid Laroi
- Released: 24 July 2020 (original); 6 November 2020 (F*ck Love (Savage)); 23 July 2021 (F*ck Love 3: Over You); 27 July 2021 (F*ck Love 3+: Over You)
- Genres: Emo rap; trap
- Length: 30:59 (original); 46:26 (Savage); 65:50 (3: Over You); 78:44 (3+: Over You)
- Labels: Grade A; Columbia
- Producers: 8th Diamond; Alec Wigdahl; Benny Blanco; Blake Slatkin; Bobby Raps; Cashmere Cat; Charlie Handsome; Cxdy; DeucesRK; Donn Robb; DOPAM!NE; Dr. Luke; E-Trou; FnZ; Haan; Happy Perez; Hylton Mowday; Illa da Producer; Isaiah Valmont; Joy; Keanu Beats; Khaled Rohaim; Marshmello; MJNichols; Nash Beats; Neek; Nick Mira; Nico Baran; OkTanner; Omer Fedi; Pharaoh Vice; Q Gulledge; Rio Leyva; Ryan OG; Scott Storch; Taz Taylor; The Kid Laroi; Tito; Turbo; Wizzle; Yung Talent; Ziggy K

The Kid Laroi chronology
14 with a Dream (2018)	F*ck Love (2020)	The First Time (2023)

Singles from F*ck Love
- 1. "Go" Released: 12 June 2020; 2. "Tell Me Why" Released: 17 July 2020; 3. "Need You Most (So Sick)" Released: 21 August 2020

F*ck Love (Savage) cover

Singles from F*ck Love (Savage)
- 1. "So Done" Released: 23 October 2020; 2. "Without You" Released: 18 December 2020

F*ck Love 3: Over You cover

Singles from F*ck Love 3: Over You
- 1. "Stay" Released: 9 July 2021

F*ck Love 3+: Over You cover

F*ck Love (stylised in all caps) is the debut mixtape by Australian singer and rapper the Kid Laroi. It was released on 24 July 2020, by Grade A Productions and Columbia Records. Production was handled by a variety of record producers over the course of the mixtape's four releases, including Benny Blanco, Bobby Raps, Cashmere Cat, and Taz Taylor. The original tracklist features guest appearances from Lil Mosey, Corbin Smidzik, and the late Juice Wrld.

According to a description by Apple Music, the record focuses on "...the messy breakdown of a destructive relationship that didn't sound too great to start with."

A reissue of the mixtape, titled F*ck Love (Savage), was released on 6 November 2020, with appearances from Machine Gun Kelly, Marshmello, Internet Money and Youngboy Never Broke Again.

Another reissue of the mixtape, titled F*ck Love 3: Over You, was released on 23 July 2021, with appearances from Polo G, Stunna Gambino, Justin Bieber, G Herbo, Lil Durk, and Mustard, as well as a deluxe edition titled F*ck Love 3+: Over You, released on 27 July 2021.

F*ck Love received a nomination for Best Hip Hop Release at the 2020 ARIA Music Awards. It reached number one on the Australian ARIA album chart in February 2021, making the Kid Laroi the youngest Australian solo artist to reach number one on the chart. It also topped the album charts in Canada, the Netherlands, Norway, and the United States.

== Artwork ==
The Guilty Crown inspired cover art, which depicts Laroi and his unnamed lover in an anime styled metropolitan city, was made by anime artist Richard Ticas, and was unveiled a week ahead of the mixtape's release.

Professional ratings
Review scores
Source	Rating
AllMusic	3/5 stars
NME	4/5 stars

== Singles ==
The mixtape was preceded by two singles: "Go", and "Tell Me Why", with the former song being a collaboration with late rapper and mentor Juice Wrld, and the latter being a tribute to the late rapper. "Need You Most (So Sick)" was sent to Australian contemporary hit radio as the third single in August 2020.

== Commercial performance ==
In Australia, F*ck Love debuted at number three on the ARIA chart. In its 28th week in February 2021, the album reached number one, and at 17 years, 5 months and 22 days, the Kid Laroi became the youngest Australian solo artist to hit number one on the ARIA album chart and the second male indigenous solo artist to top the chart after Geoffrey Gurrumul Yunupingu.

In the United States, F*ck Love debuted at number eight on the Billboard 200 chart, earning 40,000 album-equivalent units (including 7,000 copies as pure album sales) in its first week. The album became Laroi's first US top-ten debut. The album also accumulated at total of 49.39 million on-demand streams of the album's songs that week.

Following the release of F*ck Love (Savage), the project reached a new peak of number three, earning 52,000 equivalent album units.

Following the release of F*ck Love 3: Over You, the third release of the mixtape, it reached a new peak of number one on the Billboard 200, jumping 25 spots on the chart with 85,000 album equivalent units, becoming Laroi's first chart-topping project in the United States.

== Reissues ==
A reissue of the mixtape was released on 6 November 2020. Titled F*ck Love (Savage), it includes seven new songs, including the previously released single "So Done", as well as appearances from YoungBoy Never Broke Again, Internet Money, Marshmello, and Machine Gun Kelly. The release was accompanied with a music video for the track "Always Do". According to Triple J, the release of F*ck Love (Savage) is an opposite to the original mixtape; "where the original mixtape had Laroi focusing on love and loss, the new material featured here sees him coming from a different space, reflecting the personal changes he's undergone in the last year".

Another reissue of the mixtape was released on 23 July 2021. Titled F*ck Love 3: Over You, it includes seven new songs, including the previously released single "Stay" alongside Justin Bieber, as well as appearances from Polo G, Stunna Gambino, G Herbo, Lil Durk, and Mustard. The release was accompanied with a music video for the track "Not Sober". As the title suggests, Over You has Laroi focusing on moving on from his previous relationships and beginning a new one. The deluxe edition named F*ck Love 3+: Over You which featured six additional tracks, was released on 27 July 2021.

== Track listing ==
Standard edition
No.	Title	Writer(s)	Producer(s)	Length
1.	"Booty Call" (skit)	Charlton Howard		0:56
2.	"Maybe"	Howard; Subhaan Rahmaan; Christian Laster; Omer Fedi	Haan; Donn Robb; Fedi; Khaled Rohaim	2:54
3.	"Wrong" (featuring Lil Mosey)	Howard; Lathan Echols; Cody Rounds; Elijah Rogers; Danny Snodgrass Jr.	Cxdy; DeucesRK; Taz Taylor; Rohaim	3:03
4.	"I Wish"	Howard; Rio Leyva; Luis Witkiewitz; Snodgrass	Leyva; Wizzle; Taz Taylor	2:05
5.	"Not Fair" (featuring Corbin)	Howard; Corbin Smidzik; Ryan Vojtesak; Robert Richardson; Rohaim	Charlie Handsome; Bobby Raps; Rohaim; Mowday	2:46
6.	"Bathroom" (skit)	Howard		0:24
7.	"Go" (with Juice Wrld)	Howard; Jarad Higgins; Fedi; Nicco Catalano; Tristan Seccuro	Fedi; Neek; Tito	3:01
8.	"Tell Me Why"	Howard; Tanner Katich; Henry Nichols; Leyva; Maxwell Nichols; Snodgrass	OkTanner; Pharaoh Vice; Leyva; MJNichols; Taz Taylor	3:15
9.	"Same Thing"	Howard; Rohaim; Brandon Dickinson	Rohaim; The Kid Laroi	2:04
10.	"New Guy" (skit)	Howard		0:21
11.	"Erase U"	Howard; Benjamin Levin; Nathan Perez; Magnus Høiberg	Benny Blanco; Happy Perez; Cashmere Cat; Rohaim; Mowday	1:49
12.	"Running"	Howard; Rohaim; Rahmen	Rohaim; Haan; The Kid Laroi; Mowday	2:15
13.	"Wish You Well" (skit)	Howard		0:35
14.	"Need You Most (So Sick)"	Howard; Rohaim; Rahmaan; Laster; Shaffer Smith; Tor Hermansen; Mikkel Eriksen	Rohaim; Haan; Donn Robb; Rohaim; Mowday	2:15
15.	"Selfish"	Howard; Rohaim; Olivia McCarthy	Rohaim; Joy	3:16
Total length:				30:59

F*ck Love (Savage) Deluxe edition
No.	Title	Writer(s)	Producer(s)	Length
1.	"Pikachu"	Howard; Rohaim; Rahman; Keanu Torres; Michael Mulé; Isaac De Boni	Rohaim; Haan; Keanu Beats; FnZ	2:13
2.	"So Done"	Howard; Rohaim; Fedi	Rohaim; Fedi	2:06
3.	"Tragic" (featuring YoungBoy Never Broke Again and Internet Money)	Howard; Kentrell Gaulden; Rounds; Nico Baran; Snodgrass	Cxdy; Baran; Taz Taylor	2:33
4.	"Always Do"	Howard; Rohaim; Rahmaan; Laster; Fedi; Billy Walsh	Rohaim; Haan; Donn Robb; Fedi	2:31
5.	"Feel Something" (with Marshmello)	Howard; Christopher Comstock; Scott Storch; Illya Fraser	Marshmello; Storch; Illa da Producer	2:19
6.	"F*ck You, Goodbye" (featuring Machine Gun Kelly)	Howard; Colson Baker; Lukasz Gottwald; Ryan Ogren; Theron Thomas; Asia Smith; Tom DeLonge . Mark Hoppus	Dr. Luke; Ryan OG	2:24
7.	"Without You"	Howard; Blake Slatkin; Fedi; Walsh	Slatkin; Fedi	2:41
Total length:				46:26

F*ck Love 3: Over You Deluxe edition
No.	Title	Writer(s)	Producer(s)	Length
1.	"Over You"	Howard; Rohaim	Rohaim	2:30
2.	"Not Sober" (featuring Polo G and Stunna Gambino)	Howard; Taurus Bartlett; Isaias Garcia; Khalick Caldwell; Rahmaan; Rohaim	Haan; Rohaim; 8th Diamond	3:36
3.	"Stay" (with Justin Bieber)	Howard; Justin Bieber; Høiberg; Charlie Puth; Fedi; Slatkin; Mulé; De Boni; Rahmaan	Cashmere Cat; Puth; Fedi; Slatkin; Josh Gudwin^{[c]}	2:21
4.	"Same Energy"	Howard; Snodgrass; Rounds; Gino Getas	Taylor; Cxdy; E-Trou; Nash Beats	1:33
5.	"Don't Leave Me" (featuring G Herbo and Lil Durk)	Howard; Herbert Wright III; Durk Banks; Chandler Durham; Camren Martin; Slatkin	Turbo; Yung Talent^{[a]}	2:47
6.	"Bad News"	Howard; Rahmaan; Rohaim	Haan; Rohaim	2:11
7.	"Still Chose You" (featuring Mustard)	Howard; Dijon McFarlane; Shah Rukh Zaman Khan; Quintin Gulledge	Mustard; GYLTTRYP^{[a]}; Gulledge^{[b]}	2:51
Total length:				65:50

F*ck Love 3+: Over You Complete edition
No.	Title	Writer(s)	Producer(s)	Length
8.	"I Don't Know"	Howard; Mulé; De Boni; Torres; Rohaim; Antonio Zito	FnZ; Keanu Beats; Rohaim; Dopamine	2:14
9.	"About You"	Howard; Rahmaan; Rohaim	Haan; Rohaim	2:08
10.	"Lonely and F*cked Up"	Howard; Nicholas Mira; Snodgrass; Rounds	Nick Mira; Taylor; Cxdy	2:42
11.	"Situation"	Howard; Snodgrass	Taylor	1:44
12.	"Attention"	Howard; Rahmaan; Rohaim	Haan; Rohaim	1:44
13.	"Best for Me"	Howard; Rahmaan; Rohaim	Haan; Rohaim	2:22
Total length:				78:44

=== Notes ===
- "Need You Most (So Sick)" contains an interpolation of So Sick by Ne-Yo
- "F*ck You, Goodbye" contains an interpolation of All The Small Things by Blink-182

== Charts ==
=== Weekly charts ===
Weekly chart performance for F*ck Love
Chart (2020–2021)	Peak position
Australian Albums (ARIA)	1
Australian Hip Hop/R&B Albums (ARIA)	1
Austrian Albums (Ö3 Austria)	11
Belgian Albums (Ultratop Flanders)	5
Belgian Albums (Ultratop Wallonia)	119
Canadian Albums (Billboard)	1
Danish Albums (Hitlisten)	2
Danish Albums (Hitlisten) F*ck Love 3: Over You	3
Dutch Albums (Album Top 100)	1
Estonian Albums (Eesti Tipp-40)	12
Finnish Albums (Suomen virallinen lista)	5
French Albums (SNEP)	174
French Albums (SNEP) F*ck Love 3: Over You	32
German Albums (Offizielle Top 100)	33
German Hip-Hop Albums (Offizielle Top 100)	7
Icelandic Albums (Tónlistinn)	10
Irish Albums (Official Charts)	5
Italian Albums (FIMI)	38
Lithuanian Albums (AGATA)	12
New Zealand Albums (RMNZ)	2
Norwegian Albums (VG-lista)	1
Spanish Albums (Promusicae)	62
Swedish Albums (Sverigetopplistan)	4
Swedish Albums (Sverigetopplistan) F*ck Love 3: Over You	14
Swedish Hip-Hop Albums (Sverigetopplistan)	1
Swiss Albums (Schweizer Hitparade)	46
UK Albums (Official Charts)	6
UK R&B Albums (Official Charts)	10
US Billboard 200	1
US Top R&B/Hip-Hop Albums (Billboard)	1

=== Year-end charts ===
2020 year-end chart performance for F*ck Love
Chart (2020)	Position
Australian Albums (ARIA)	25
Australian Hip Hop/R&B Albums (ARIA)	5
Belgian Albums (Ultratop Flanders)	149
Danish Albums (Hitlisten)	74
New Zealand Albums (RMNZ)	35
Norwegian Albums (VG-lista)	12
US Billboard 200	190
US Top R&B/Hip-Hop Albums (Billboard)	75

2021 year-end chart performance for F*ck Love
Chart (2021)	Position
Australian Albums (ARIA)	3
Australian Hip Hop/R&B Albums (ARIA)	1
Belgian Albums (Ultratop Flanders)	28
Canadian Albums (Billboard)	2
Danish Albums (Hitlisten)	7
Danish Albums (Hitlisten) F*ck Love 3: Over You	57
Dutch Albums (Album Top 100)	7
Finnish Albums (Suomen virallinen lista)	6
Irish Albums (IRMA)	29
New Zealand Albums (RMNZ)	14
Norwegian Albums (VG-lista)	3
Swedish Albums (Sverigetopplistan)	28
UK Albums (OCC)	25
US Billboard 200	6
US Top R&B/Hip-Hop Albums (Billboard)	3

2022 year-end chart performance for F*ck Love
Chart (2022)	Position
Australian Albums (ARIA)	21
Australian Hip Hop/R&B Albums (ARIA)	4
Belgian Albums (Ultratop Flanders)	139
Canadian Albums (Billboard)	13
Danish Albums (Hitlisten)	92
Dutch Albums (Album Top 100)	98
New Zealand Albums (RMNZ)	37
US Billboard 200	28
US Top R&B/Hip-Hop Albums (Billboard)	14

2023 year-end chart performance for F*ck Love
Chart (2023)	Position
Australian Albums (ARIA)	94
Australian Hip Hop/R&B Albums (ARIA)	31
US Billboard 200	124
US Top R&B/Hip-Hop Albums (Billboard)	81

2024 year-end chart performance for F*ck Love
Chart (2024)	Position
Australian Hip Hop/R&B Albums (ARIA)	39

== Certifications ==
Certifications for F*ck Love
Region	Certification	Certified units/sales
Australia (ARIA)	2× Platinum	140,000^{‡}
Brazil (Pro-Música Brasil)	3× Platinum	120,000^{‡}
Canada (Music Canada)	3× Platinum	240,000^{‡}
Denmark (IFPI Danmark)	2× Platinum	40,000^{‡}
Italy (FIMI)	Gold	25,000^{‡}
Mexico (AMPROFON)	Platinum+Gold	90,000^{‡}
Singapore (RIAS)	Gold	5,000^{*}
Switzerland (IFPI Switzerland)	Gold	10,000^{‡}
United Kingdom (BPI)	Platinum	300,000^{‡}
United States (RIAA)	3× Platinum	3,000,000^{‡}
^{*} Sales figures based on certification alone.^{‡} Sales+streaming figures based on certification alone.

Certifications for F*ck Love 3: Over You
Region	Certification	Certified units/sales
Denmark (IFPI Danmark)	Platinum	20,000^{‡}
France (SNEP)	Gold	50,000^{‡}
Netherlands (NVPI)	Platinum	40,000^{‡}
New Zealand (RMNZ)	4× Platinum	60,000^{‡}
Poland (ZPAV)	Platinum	20,000^{‡}
^{‡} Sales+streaming figures based on certification alone.
