= Go (The Kid Laroi and Juice Wrld song) =

2020 single by the Kid Laroi and Juice Wrld

Single by the Kid Laroi and Juice Wrld

from the album F*ck Love
- Released: 12 June 2020
- Recorded: August 2019
- Genre: Emo rap; trap; pop rap
- Length: 3:03
- Label: Grade A; Columbia
- Songwriters: Charlton Howard; Jarad Higgins; Tristan Seccuro; Omer Fedi; Nicco Catalano
- Producers: Tito Beats; Fedi; Neek

The Kid Laroi singles chronology
| "Fade Away" (2020) | "Go" (2020) | "Tell Me Why" (2020) |

Juice Wrld singles chronology
| "Tell Me U Luv Me" (2020) | "Go" (2020) | "Pray "Put Me Down"" (2020) |

Music video
- "Go" on YouTube

"Go" (stylised in all caps or as "GO!") is a song by Australian rapper and singer the Kid Laroi and American rapper Juice Wrld, released on 12 June 2020 as the lead single from Laroi's debut mixtape F*ck Love, released on 24 July 2020. The song was recorded while the two, who were close friends, met up in Greece in 2019. That recording is included in the song's official video, with both the song and video serving as a tribute to Juice Wrld who died in December 2019.

== Background ==
Prior to recording "Go", the Kid Laroi and Juice Wrld were already familiar with each other; Laroi considered Juice Wrld, who was his mentor, his "big brother" and had opened shows for Juice's final tour in Sydney and Melbourne, Australia, in 2019, and was subsequently signed by Juice's managers, Grade A Productions. On the night of Laroi's 16th birthday in August 2019, Laroi played Juice a demo, and Juice freestyled a verse, which would end being the verse heard on "Go". The song leaked a while before its release, and was described as "the first taste" of Laroi's debut commercial mixtape F*ck Love, which was released on 24 July 2020. "Go" was released as the seventh track out of fifteen on the mixtape. To accommodate for the song being leaked, Laroi remade his verse before the song's release as a single.
To coincide with the song's release, the Kid Laroi posted a photo on social media of himself and Juice, stating:

"[...] I got to learn from a real life legend. it's not even in my character to write long a** s*** like this but f*** it our song is about to come out and I just wanna say how much I wish you were here with me to enjoy this s***. we all love and miss you back here #LLJW"

== Composition ==
"Go" was produced by Tito Beats, Neek, and Omer Fedi and finds both rappers addressing their relationship issues. Eddie Fu of Genius noted in Juice Wrld's verse, he "references his drug addictions before apologizing to his significant other", while Laroi "gives similar promises of loyalty on the pre-chorus".

== Critical reception ==
Billboard's John Norris said the two artists' voices blend "effortlessly". Alex Zidel of HotNewHipHop said "Go" speaks to the Kid Laroi's potential as a melody-making star and, "so young, he has all the right tools to mold himself into one of the biggest artists in the world some day". Triple J's Al Newstead found the two artists' chemistry works "so well, so it's a damn shame Laroi and Juice won't get to collab again". He further stated "It's still raw hearing Juice rap about 'perky with the lean' given the circumstances of the 21-year-old's death, but there's beauty in hearing him vibe with his South Sydney protege, Laroi, who continues to flex star-in-the-making quality".

== Chart performance ==
In the Kid Laroi's native Australia, "Go" debuted at number 23, the highest new entry on the ARIA Singles Chart for the chart dated 22 June 2020. On the US Billboard Hot 100, it debuted at number 52, becoming the Kid Laroi's first Hot 100 entry.

== Music video ==
The official video, directed by Steve Cannon, premiered on 11 June 2020, the day before the song's release. Laroi said the whole concept of the video was "to capture and remember the moments me and Juice made together when we created this in Greece". The visual begins with Juice apologizing for not attending Laroi's 16th birthday party. He promises to gift his friend $200,000 in the form of a verse. Scenes of Juice WRLD are interspersed throughout the video, showing him in the studio, at a live show, and being casual. The video also alternates between "heart-rending" road footage of Juice and Laroi, and cuts to scenes shot in 2019, in Los Angeles, where Laroi is seen with a biker crew, and alone on a balcony, in front of a mic that recalls the one used by Juice at the beginning of the clip, as well as Juice also singing his verse in the studio in a few short parts of the video.

=== Response ===
Billboard's John Norris described the visual as "melancholy and affecting, but somehow, also lighthearted". Amnplify Australia called the video nostalgic, noting how it features some of the intimate moments between the two rappers and "embodies the endearing dynamic that resulted in the creation of the song. The video is essentially an ode to friendship and closeness and a way for The Kid Laroi to honour his mentor".

== Charts ==
=== Weekly charts ===
Weekly chart performance for "Go"
| Chart (2020) | Peak position |
|---|---|
| Australia (ARIA) | 23 |
| Australia Hip Hop/R&B (ARIA) | 10 |
| Canada Hot 100 (Billboard) | 40 |
| Greece International (IFPI) | 85 |
| Ireland (IRMA) | 42 |
| Lithuania (AGATA) | 88 |
| New Zealand (Recorded Music NZ) | 32 |
| Portugal (AFP) | 95 |
| UK Singles (OCC) | 43 |
| UK Hip Hop/R&B (OCC) | 27 |
| US Billboard Hot 100 | 52 |
| US Hot R&B/Hip-Hop Songs (Billboard) | 22 |
| US Rhythmic Airplay (Billboard) | 30 |
| US Rolling Stone Top 100 | 27 |

=== Year-end charts ===
Year-end chart performance for "Go"
| Chart (2020) | Position |
|---|---|
| Australian Artist (ARIA) | 22 |
| Chart (2021) | Position |
| Australian Artist (ARIA) | 35 |

== Certifications ==
Certifications for "Go"
| Region | Certification | Certified units/sales |
|---|---|---|
| Australia (ARIA) | Platinum | 70,000^{‡} |
| Brazil (Pro-Música Brasil) | Gold | 20,000^{‡} |
| Canada (Music Canada) | 2× Platinum | 160,000^{‡} |
| Denmark (IFPI Danmark) | Gold | 45,000^{‡} |
| New Zealand (RMNZ) | Platinum | 30,000^{‡} |
| Portugal (AFP) | Gold | 5,000^{‡} |
| United Kingdom (BPI) | Gold | 400,000^{‡} |
| United States (RIAA) | 3× Platinum | 3,000,000^{‡} |
^{‡} Sales+streaming figures based on certification alone.
