= Omer Fedi =

Israeli songwriter and producer (born 2000)

Omer Fedi עומר פדי
- Born: 25 March 2000 (age 26); Tel Aviv, Israel
- Origin: Los Angeles, California, U.S.
- Genres: Hip-hop; pop-punk; R&B; emo rap; pop; jazz
- Occupations: Record producer; songwriter; musician
- Instruments: Guitar; bass; drums; keyboards
- Years active: 2018–present
- Label: Universal

Omer Fedi (Hebrew: עומר פדי; born 25 March 2000) is an Israeli record producer, songwriter and musician from Tel Aviv. He has co-written or produced songs such as "Mood" by 24kGoldn, "Montero (Call Me by Your Name)" by Lil Nas X, "Unholy" by Sam Smith and Kim Petras, and "Stay" by the Kid Laroi and Justin Bieber, all four of which peaked atop the Billboard Hot 100. In addition, he also co-produced the Kid Laroi and Juice Wrld's platinum single "Go!" and Machine Gun Kelly's album Tickets to My Downfall, which peaked atop the Billboard 200. He was included on XXL magazine's list of the "best hip-hop producers of 2020". He is the recipient and nominee of several Grammys, iHeart Radio Music Awards, BMI Awards and Variety Awards.

== Early life ==
Omer Fedi's father, Asher Fedi (1970–2025), was a drummer who MTV described as "one of the most accomplished and well-respected drummers in Israel." Asher taught his son to play drums from a young age. Inspired by Drake Bell's character, Drake Parker in Drake & Josh, Omer began learning the guitar at the age of ten. At 16, Fedi and his father moved to Los Angeles in order to find further musical opportunities, where he then enrolled in Calabasas High School. Joining his high school's jazz ensemble, his playing soon began drawing audiences outside of the regular parent attendees. A jazz clinician he worked with as part of the ensemble said Fedi "could speak through the instrument" when he played guitar. In 2018, he won the Outstanding Performer award at the Reno Jazz Festival, surpassing more than 9,000 other contestants. In the following year, he was approached by songwriter Sam Hook to collaborate. Fedi says that he had never written a song until then, but he worked with Hook every day after school.

== Career ==
Working with Sam Hook, Fedi began writing songs for artists like Ella Mai. He started working with Yungblud shortly after he finished high school and began branching out to other artists as well. Fedi soon met 24kGoldn at a party, then they started writing together just a week later. Beginning in March 2020, Fedi began performing on Machine Gun Kelly's COVID-19 lockdown session, where he covered songs such as "Misery Business" and "Waiting on the World to Change". On 31 March 2020, "City of Angels" by 24kGoldn was released, which Fedi co-wrote, produced and performed on. On 12 June, "Go!" by the Kid Laroi featuring Juice Wrld was released, which Fedi produced. On the same day, I'm Gone by Iann Dior was released, which Fedi produced and composed. Fedi co-wrote and performed on Mood by 24kGoldn featuring Iann Dior, which was released on 24 July 2020, peaked at number one and remained in the charts for 33 weeks. On the same day, the Kid Laroi's mixtape F*ck Love was released, which Fedi produced and helped compose. On November 6, "Without You" was released along with the F*ck Love deluxe titled F*ck Love (Savage), which Fedi co-wrote, composed and produced. The song peaked at number 34 on the Billboard Hot 100.

He performed guitar and bass and co-produced on Machine Gun Kelly's album Tickets to My Downfall, which was released in September 2020, and peaked at number one on the Billboard 200. In December 2020, Yungblud's album Weird! was released, which Fedi performed on.

Lil Nas X's song "Montero (Call Me by Your Name)", was released on March 26, 2021, making its debut at the top of the Billboard Hot 100. Lil Nas X proceeded to release his full length Montero album which Fedi executive produced. Lead single "That's What I Want" continued to go #1 on the Top 40 Chart.

The Kid Laroi later released "Without You" with Miley Cyrus which Fedi performed at SNL on May 8, 2021, alongside Miley and Laroi.

Fedi worked with The Kid Laroi and Justin Bieber on their single "Stay" (released July 9, 2021.) "Stay" peaked at No. 1 on the Billboard Hot 100, along with the Billboard Global 200 and spent seven weeks at the top of the chart, becoming the second longest running song of all-time on the chart and spent the most weeks at No. 1 in pop radio history. On 2 September 2022 Sam Smith and Kim Petras released "Unholy" which Fedi co-wrote and co-produced. "Unholy" peaked at number one on the Billboard Hot 100 and went on to win a grammy for Best Pop Duo/Group Performance.

On December 9, 2022, SZA released her song "Special" which Fedi also co-wrote and co-produced on. It was released as a part of SZA's album SOS which debuted at the #1 on the Top 200 and went on to win the Grammy for Best Progressive R&B Album.

In 2024, he was a co-producer on Rosé and Bruno Mars' "APT." which went to #1 on the Billboard Global 200. Additionally, he co-produced the track "B2B" and "360" for Charli XCX and wrote/produced the track BMF on SZA's SOS album.

In 2025, Omer Fedi co-composed and produced Reneé Rapp's single "Mad" for her sophomore record, Bite Me.

== Discography ==
=== Albums ===
Year	Title	Artist	Role	Comments
2018	Ella Mai	Ella Mai	Composing	
2019	Hotel Diablo	Machine Gun Kelly	Guitar	
2019	Nothings Ever Good Enough	Iann Dior	Composition	
2019	Industry Plant	Iann Dior	Composition	
2019	Dropped Out of College	24kGoldn	Composition, production	
2020	Nicotine	Trevor Daniel	Production, songwriting	
2020	I'm Gone	Iann Dior	Composition, production	
2020	F*ck Love	The Kid Laroi	Composition, production	Billboard 200 No.1 Album
2020	Tickets to My Downfall	Machine Gun Kelly	Bass, guitar, production, composition	Billboard 200 No.1 Album
2020	Weird!	Yungblud	Guitar, bass, production, composition	UK No.1 Album
2021	Pink Planet	Pink Sweats	Guitar	
2021	El Dorado	24kGoldn	Guitar, keyboards, programming	
2021	Montero	Lil Nas X	Songwriting, production, guitar	
2022	Yungblud	Yungblud	Songwriting, guitar	
2022	SOS	SZA	Songwriting, production	Billboard 200 No.1 Album
2022	Mainstream Sellout	Machine Gun Kelly	Songwriting, production	Billboard 200 No.1 Album
2023	Gloria	Sam Smith	Songwriting, production, guitar	UK No.1 Album

=== Songs ===
Year	Title	Artist	Credits	Comments
2018	"Naked"	Ella Mai	Writer	2× Platinum (Single)
2019	"I Can't Walk Away"	Anthony Russo	Writer, producer	
2019	"18"	Iann Dior	Writer	
2019	"Fast"	Arizona Zervas	Writer, producer	
2019	"Lifetime"	Ginette Claudette	Writer, producer	
2019	"Real From the Start"	YS	Writer, producer	
2019	"Stuck in My Ways"	YS	Writer, producer	
2019	"Love Dies"	12am	Writer, producer	
2019	"Pretty"	Landon Cube	Writer, producer	
2019	"Never is Enough"	Iann Dior	Writer, producer	
2019	"In Too Deep"	Iann Dior	Writer, producer	
2019	"Stay for a While"	Iann Dior	Writer, producer	
2019	"Nothing Left to Say"	Baby E	Writer, producer	
2019	"City of Angels"	24kGoldn	Writer, producer	Platinum (Single)
2019	"Games on Your Phone"	24kGoldn	Writer, producer	
2019	"My Bed"	24kGoldn	Writer, producer	
2019	"A Lot to Lose"	24kGoldn	Writer, producer	
2020	"Bathroom Stall in Seattle"	Lauren Sanderson	Writer, producer	
2020	"Drugs"	Landon Cube	Writer, producer	
2020	"Start Over"	Jutes	Writer, producer	
2020	"Sideshow"	Jutes	Writer, producer	
2020	"Where Are You Going"	Jutes	Writer, producer	
2020	"Lovesick"	Trevor Daniel	Writer, producer	
2020	"911"	Trevor Daniel	Writer, producer	
2020	"Nicotine"	Trevor Daniel	Writer, producer	
2020	"OMG"	Trevor Daniel	Writer, producer	
2020	"All of That"	Trevor Daniel	Writer, producer	
2020	"Disaster"	Trevor Daniel	Writer	
2020	"Sick and Tired"	Iann Dior	Writer, producer	Platinum (Single)
2020	"Miami"	Noah Cunane	Writer, producer	
2020	"Nobody Else"	lilspirit	Writer, producer	
2020	"Paradise"	Iann Dior	Writer, producer	
2020	"Sickness"	Iann Dior	Writer, producer	
2020	"Psycho"	Iann Dior	Writer, producer	
2020	"Go"	The Kid Laroi, Juice Wrld	Writer, producer	Gold (Single)
2020	"Maybe"	The Kid Laroi	Writer, producer	2× Platinum (Single)
2020	"For You"	IV Jay	Writer, producer	
2020	"Forget Me Too"	Machine Gun Kelly	Writer, producer	Platinum (Single)
2020	"Drunk Face"	Machine Gun Kelly	Writer, producer	
2020	"All I Know"	Machine Gun Kelly	Writer, producer	
2020	"Kiss Kiss"	Machine Gun Kelly	Writer, producer	
2020	"Nothing Inside"	Machine Gun Kelly	Writer, producer	
2020	"Title Track"	Machine Gun Kelly	Writer, producer	Gold (Single)
2020	"Body Bag"	Machine Gun Kelly	Writer, producer	Gold (Single)
2020	"Misery Business"	Machine Gun Kelly	Writer, producer	Gold (Single)
2020	"Can't Look Back"	Machine Gun Kelly	Writer, producer	2× Platinum (Single)
2020	"Without You"	The Kid Laroi, Miley Cyrus	Writer, producer	Platinum (Single)
2020	"So Done"	The Kid Laroi	Writer, producer	Platinum (Single)
2020	"Always Do"	The Kid Laroi	Writer, producer	4× Platinum (Single)
2020	"Holding On"	Iann Dior	Writer, producer	Gold (Single)
2020	"Cotton Candy"	YungBlud	Writer, producer	
2020	"Mars"	YungBlud	Writer, producer	
2020	"Teresa"	YungBlud	Writer, producer	
2020	"Slam the Door"	Landon Cube	Writer, producer	
2020	"Lie to Me"	Landon Cube	Writer, producer	
2020	"Risk"	Landon Cube	Writer, producer	
2020	"Light Blue"	Landon Cube	Writer, producer	
2020	"Soul"	Landon Cube	Writer, producer	
2020	"Last Cigarette"	Landon Cube	Writer, producer	
2020	"Seattle"	Landon Cube	Writer, producer	
2020	"Hobosexual"	8-Aug	Writer, producer	
2020	"Sorry"	Tokyo's Revenge	Writer, producer	
2021	"Tired of Me"	SSGKobe	Writer, producer	
2021	"Coco"	24kGoldn	Writer, producer	
2021	"3,2,1"	24kGoldn	Writer, producer	
2021	"Company"	24kGoldn	Writer, producer	
2021	"Love or Lust"	24kGoldn	Writer, producer	
2021	"Breath Away"	24kGoldn	Writer, producer	
2021	"Outta Pocket"	24kGoldn	Writer, producer	
2021	"Butterflies"	24kGoldn	Writer, producer	
2021	"Empty (feat. Swae Lee)"	24kGoldn	Writer, producer	Gold (Single)
2021	"Yellow Lights"	24kGoldn	Writer, producer	Gold (Single)
2021	"Don't Sleep"	24kGoldn	Writer, producer	Gold (Single)
2021	"Montero (Call Me by Your Name)"	Lil Nas X	Writer, producer	6× Platinum (Single)
2021	"Shots in the Dark"	Iann Dior feat. Trippie Redd	Writer, producer	
2021	"Sun Goes Down"	Lil Nas X	Writer, producer	Gold (Single)
2021	"Mood" (feat. Iann Dior)	24kGoldn	Writer, producer	Billboard Hot 100 Number One Single, Top 40 (Billboard Pop Airplay) Number One Single, UK Official Chart Number One Single, 7× Platinum (Single)
2021	"Stay"	The Kid Laroi, Justin Bieber	Writer, producer	Billboard Hot 100 Number One Single, Top 40 (Billboard Pop Airplay) Number One Single, UK Official Chart Number One Single, 11× Platinum [Diamond] (Single)
2021	"Control the World"	24k Goldn, Lil Wayne	Writer, producer	
2021	"Still Breathing"	Arizona Zervas	Writer	
2021	"Thats What I Want"	Lil Nas X	Writer, producer	Top 40 (Billboard Pop Airplay) Number One Single
2021	"Tales of Dominica"	Lil Nas X	Writer, producer	
2021	"Am I Dreaming"	Lil Nas X	Writer, producer	3× Platinum (Single)
2021	"Let You"	Iann Dior	Writer, producer	
2021	"Feels Like"	Gracie Abrams	Writer	
2021	"The Bottom"	Gracie Abrams	Writer, producer	
2022	"Hopeless Romantic"	Iann Dior	Writer, producer	
2022	"Bite Me"	Avril Lavigne	Writer	
2022	"Coke Nose"	Caspr	Writer, producer	
2022	"Play Pretend"	Caspr	Writer, producer	
2022	"Don't Make Sense"	Caspr	Writer, producer	
2022	"Wandered to LA"	Juice Wrld, Justin Bieber	Writer	
2022	"Maybe" (feat. Bring Me the Horizon)	Machine Gun Kelly	Writer, producer	Gold (Single)
2022	"Make Up Sex" (feat. Blackbear)	Machine Gun Kelly	Writer, producer	Gold (Single)
2022	"Twin Flame"	Machine Gun Kelly	Writer, producer	
2022	"Fake Love Don't Last" (feat. Iann Dior)	Machine Gun Kelly	Writer, producer	
2022	"Drug Dealer" (feat. Lil Wayne)	Machine Gun Kelly	Writer, producer	
2022	"Memories"	Yungblud, Willow Smith	Writer	
2022	"GFY"	Blackbear, Machine Gun Kelly	Writer	
2022	"You're So Cool"	Tate McRae	Writer	
2022	"Wrapped Around Your Finger"	Post Malone	Writer, producer	Gold (Single)
2022	"I Love You Bitch"	Lizzo	Writer, producer	
2022	"Unholy"	Sam Smith & Kim Petras	Writer, producer	Billboard Hot 100 Number One Single, Top 40 (Billboard Pop Airplay) Number One Single, UK Official Chart Number One Single, Platinum (Single), Won Grammy for Best Pop Duo/Group Performance
2022	"Star Walkin'"	Lil Nas X	Writer, producer	5× Platinum (Single)
2022	"For the Night"	Chlöe Bailey, Latto	Writer, producer	
2022	"Too Well"	Reneé Rapp	Writer, producer	
2022	"Special"	SZA	Writer, producer	
2023	"Can't Go Back to the Way It Was (Intro)"	The Kid Laroi	Writer, producer	
2023	"Love Again"	The Kid Laroi	Writer, producer	Gold (Single)
2023	"Lose You"	Sam Smith	Writer, producer	
2023	"How to Cry"	Sam Smith	Writer, producer	
2023	"In the Dark"	Ava Max	Writer, producer	
2023	"WOMB"	Melanie Martinez	Writer, producer	
2023	"Vulgar"	Sam Smith, Madonna	Writer, producer	
2023	"Praying 4 Love"	Trippie Redd	Writer, producer	
2023	"Too Much"	The Kid Laroi, Jung Kook, Central Cee	Writer, producer	
2023	"In the City"	Charli XCX, Sam Smith	Writer, producer	
2023	"What Just Happened"	The Kid Laroi	Writer, producer	
2023	"Bleed"	The Kid Laroi	Writer, producer	
2023	"Where Do You Sleep?"	The Kid Laroi	Writer, producer	
2023	"The Line"	The Kid Laroi	Writer, producer	
2023	"You"	The Kid Laroi	Writer, producer	
2023	"Call Me Instead"	The Kid Laroi	Writer, producer	
2023	"Strangers Pt. 2 (Interlude)"	The Kid Laroi	Writer, producer	
2024	"J Christ"	Lil Nas X	Writer, producer	
2024	"Heaven"	The Kid Laroi	Writer, producer	
2024	"Where Do We Go Now?"	Lil Nas X	Writer, producer	
2024	"360"	Charli XCX	Writer	
2024	"B2B" (feat. Tinashe)	Charli XCX	Producer	
2024	"Debut"	Katseye	Writer	
2024	"Touch"	Katseye	Writer, producer	
2024	"1-800-Hot-N-Fun"	Le Sserafim	Writer	
2024	"365" (feat. Shygirl)	Charli XCX	Writer	
2024	"APT."	Rosé, Bruno Mars	Writer, producer	
2024	"Number One Girl"	Rosé	Writer, producer	
2024	"Drinks or Coffee"	Rosé	Writer, producer	
2024	"Vampirehollie"	Rosé	Writer, producer	
2026	"Animal"	Katseye	Writer, producer	
2026	"Material Lover"	Sienna Spiro	Writer, producer	Co-written with Spiro and Michael Pollack (songwriter)

== Awards ==
=== Asian Pop Music Awards ===
Year	Nominee / Work	Award	Result	Ref.
2025	"Number One Girl"	Best Composer	Nominated	

=== Grammy Awards ===
Year	Nominee / Work	Award	Result	Ref.
2022	"Montero (Call Me by Your Name)"	Record of the Year	Nominated	
2022	"Montero (Call Me by Your Name)"	Song of the Year	Nominated	
2022	Montero	Album of the Year	Nominated	
2023	Special	Album of the Year	Nominated	
2026	"APT."	Record of the Year	Nominated	
2026	"APT."	Song of the Year	Nominated	

=== iHeartRadio Music Awards ===
Year	Nominee / Work	Award	Result	Ref.
2022	Omer Fedi	Songwriter of the Year	Won	
2023	Omer Fedi	Songwriter of the Year	Nominated	

=== BMI Awards ===
Year	Nominee / Work	Award	Result	Ref.
2022	"Mood"	Song of the Year	Won	
2022	Omer Fedi	Songwriter of the Year	Won	
2023	"Stay"	Song of the Year	Won	
2023	Omer Fedi	Songwriter of the Year	Nominated	

=== Variety Awards ===
Year	Nominee / Work	Award	Result	Ref.
2021	Omer Fedi	Variety Hitmaker of the Month	Won	
2022	Omer Fedi	Variety Hitmaker of the Month	Won	

== Filmography ==
Year	Title	Role	Ref.
2021	Downfalls High	Extra	
