= Low (Juicy J song) =

Single by Juicy J featuring Nicki Minaj, Lil Bibby and Young Thug
- Released: August 7, 2014
- Recorded: 2014
- Genre: Hip-hop
- Length: 3:58
- Label: Kemosabe; Columbia
- Songwriters: Jordan Houston; Onika Maraj; Brandon Dickinson; Lukasz Gottwald; Theron Thomas; Timothy Thomas; Henry Walter
- Producers: Dr. Luke; Cirkut

Juicy J singles chronology
"Shell Shocked" (2014)	"Low" (2014)	"She Knows" (2014)

Nicki Minaj singles chronology
"Anaconda" (2014)	"Low" (2014)	"Flawless (Remix)" (2014)

Lil Bibby singles chronology
"Dead or in Prison" (2014)	"Low" (2014)	"Aww Man" (2015)

Young Thug singles chronology
"Lifestyle" (2014)	"Low" (2014)	"Throw Sum Mo" (2014)

"Low" is a song by the American rapper Juicy J featuring Lil Bibby, Young Thug and Nicki Minaj. It was released on August 7, 2014, intended as the first single from Juicy J's fourth album. However, it fared poorly commercially and was removed from the project. "Low" was written by Juicy J, Nicki Minaj, Lil Bibby, Dr. Luke, Rock City, and Cirkut. It was produced by Dr. Luke and Cirkut. The song received positive reception from music critics, most of it for Nicki Minaj's appearance. A music video directed by Benny Boom was created to promote the single.

== Background and release ==
On August 6, 2014, Juicy J announced that the first single from his fourth studio album would be released on August 7, 2014, would be titled "Low", and would feature guest appearances from Nicki Minaj, Lil Bibby and Young Thug. In the same announcement he also showed the single cover art. On August 7, 2014, a snippet version of "Low" went online hours before the full song was released for digital download.

In an interview with Bullett Media, Juicy J spoke about the collaboration with Minaj, Bibby and Thug: "I never told anybody I had a record with Bibby or Young Thug or Nicki Minaj. The day before I dropped it, I was like, 'Yo! Guess what?' And a lot of my fans on Twitter were like, 'What?' I was like, 'I'm dropping a new single tomorrow with Lil Bibby, Young Thug, and Nicki Minaj.' They couldn't believe it. That's what I'm doing. I'm shocking people."

== Critical reception ==
"Low" garnered a positive reception from music critics. Rick Florino of Artistdirect.com gave praise to the song's beat and the lyrics from all three rappers, calling it "another bona fide anthem from the king of all things." Joey DeGroot of Music Times praised the production and likened Nicki's Minaj's verse more than Juicy J's, saying, "While Juicy's rhymes are pretty laidback, Nicki's completely blow everything apart, spitting furiously with her trademark taunt." Brennan Carley of Spin also credited the song to Minaj's appearance, saying she "demonstrates her lyrical prowess with rhymes like, "I'm fly every day but a bitch ain't trippin' / You be on that bull, you be on Scottie Pippen."

== Music video ==
Directed by Benny Boom, the video features the rappers at a barbecue cookout and an empty warehouse with vehicles and speakers with colored smoke coming out of them. Young Thug does not appear in the video. The video premiered online on August 21, 2014.

== Track listing ==
Digital download
No.	Title	Length
1.	"Low" (featuring Nicki Minaj, Lil Bibby and Young Thug)	3:58

== Charts ==
Chart (2014)	Peak position
US Hot R&B/Hip-Hop Songs (Billboard)	44
