= Need You Most (So Sick) =

2020 single by the Kid Laroi

Single by the Kid Laroi

from the album F*ck Love
- Released: 21 August 2020
- Genre: Emo rap; trap
- Length: 2:15
- Label: Grade A; Columbia
- Songwriters: Charlton Howard; Khaled Rohaim; Subhaan Rahmaan; Christian Laster; Shaffer Smith; Tor Hermansen; Mikkel Eriksen
- Producers: Khaled Rohaim; Haan; Donn Robb

The Kid Laroi singles chronology
"Tell Me Why" (2020)	"Need You Most (So Sick)" (2020)	"Hell Bent" (2020)

Visualizer
- "Need You Most (So Sick)" on YouTube

"Need You Most (So Sick)" (stylised in all caps) is a song by Australian rapper and singer the Kid Laroi, sent to Australian radio on 21 August 2020 as the third single from his debut mixtape F*ck Love (2020). The song samples and interpolates "So Sick" by Ne-Yo. "Need You Most (So Sick)" peaked at number 79 on the ARIA charts.

== Charts ==
Chart (2020)	Peak position
Australia (ARIA)	79
Australia Hip Hop/R&B (ARIA)	29
New Zealand Hot Singles (RMNZ)	10

== Certifications ==
Region	Certification	Certified units/sales
Australia (ARIA)	Platinum	70,000^{‡}
Canada (Music Canada)	Gold	40,000^{‡}
New Zealand (RMNZ)	Gold	15,000^{‡}
United States (RIAA)	Gold	500,000^{‡}
^{‡} Sales+streaming figures based on certification alone.
