= The Olympicks =

American music producers & songwriters

- Origin: Detroit, Michigan, U.S.
- Genres: Hip hop
- Years active: 2008–present
- Labels: Young Money, Cash Money
- Members: J-Fab; Knoxville
- Past members: B.P. P.C. Flawless

The Olympicks are an American hip-hop record production and songwriting group that was formed in 2009, and are currently composed of members J-Fab and Knoxville. The group originated in Detroit, Michigan and have been involved in the production of various projects within the hip-hop music industry, including Lil Wayne's I Am Not a Human Being, Rick Ross' Teflon Don, Triple C's Custom Cars & Cycles, DJ Khaled's Kiss The Ring, and Big Sean's Detroit mixtape.

== History ==
In the mid-2000s, each member of the collective had established himself as part of Michigan's independent music scene. Knoxville and J-Fab gained national recognition following the success of Jim Jones’ Summer Wit’ Miami - produced by Knoxville. J-Fab was selected to produce on former Shady Records artist Stat Quo's debut album, Statlanta.

The goal of The Olympicks’ partnership was to create a “one-stop shop” that could cater to the production needs of any artist or project based on the different qualities of each member. Knoxville is considered to be the team's “crate-digger,” and produces a sound which tends to incorporate soul samples and breakbeats. J-Fab's production technique also makes heavy utilization of record samples, but uses more pop and techno influences to create various sounds across multiple genres. Finally, Flawless crafts universal R&B/Pop beats that are prevalent in today's mainstream music.

The Olympicks have worked with both established mainstream artists as well as local and underground artists. The group was involved in Big Sean's early career, as they produced the single, "Bullshittin". They also have a relationship with Rick Ross' Maybach Music Group and recently signed a song production deal with Young Money Entertainment and Cash Money Records. They also produced "Out Of This World" for A$AP Rocky's mixtape, LiveLoveA$AP.

== Production discography ==
=== 2009 ===
Birdman - Priceless

- 14. "MP"

Triple C's - Custom Cars & Cycles

- 07. "Throw It in the Sky"
- 11. "Finer Things" (featuring Masspike Miles)
- 12. "Chick'n Talk'n" (featuring Mack 10 and Warren G) [produced with The Dream Team]

=== 2010 ===
Young Jeezy - Trap or Die, Pt. 2: By Any Means Necessary

- 10. "Just Saying"
- 20. "My Tool" (featuring Baby & Bun B)

Rick Ross - Teflon Don

- 11. "All the Money in the World" (featuring Raphael Saadiq)

Big Sean - Finally Famous, Vol 3: BIG

- 03. "What U Doin' Bullshitting"
- 07. "Crazy"

Lil Wayne - I Am Not a Human Being

- 02. "Hold Up" (featuring T-Streets)

Rocko - Rocko Dinero

- 15. "Right Here by Me"

=== 2011 ===
Jigg - High Grade

- 08. "Murda He Wrote"

P.L. - The Turning Lane

- 03. "G-Shit"
- 06. "I'm Single" (featuring Jwan)
- 07. "Like I'm 'Posed To"
- 11. "Poster P."
- 12. "On My Way" (featuring Stut)
- 14. "Back & Forth"
- 17. "Already Won"

Trouble - Green Light

- 13. "Danger Zone" (featuring Scalez)

A$AP Rocky - Live.Love.A$AP

- 16. "Out of This World"

Freddie Gibbs - Cold Day in Hell

- 07. - "Let Em Burn"

Jim Jones - Vampire Life (We Own the Night)

- 08. "Play Your Part" (featuring Chase)

=== 2012 ===
Raekwon - Unexpected Victory

- 10. "This Shit Hard" (featuring Dion Primo and LEP Bogus Boys)

Trouble - 431 Days

- 07. "U Don't Deserve Dat"

DJ Khaled - Kiss the Ring

- 15. "B-Boyz" (performed by Birdman featuring Mack Maine, Kendrick Lamar, Ace Hood and DJ Khaled)

Big Sean - Detroit

- 13. "Do What I Gotta Do" (featuring Tyga) [produced with Million $ Mano and Rob Kinelski]

Yo Gotti - CM7: The World is Yours

- 09. "Enemy or Friend"
- 16. "Buy Out"

Reese - Reese vs. The World II

- 01. "Hi"

=== 2013 ===
SAYITAINTTONE - 500 Million

- 10. "Callin Me" (featuring Front Paije) [produced with PC]
- 12. "500 Million Dollar Man"

Tyga - Hotel California

- 15. "Palm Trees"

Young Jeezy, Doughboyz Cashout & YG - Boss Ya Life Up Gang, Vol. 1

- 12. "Rub Shoulders" (performed by Doughboyz Cashout featuring Doughboy Clay)

Jim Jones - Vampire Life III

- 01. "Rotation" (featuring Mel Matrix)

Lil Bibby - Free Crack

- 15. "See Me Down"

Icewear Vezzo - The City is Mine

- 03. "D Boy Party" (featuring Trick Trick) [produced with Ant Beatz]
- 05. "Money Face" (featuring STL Juan)
- 15. "The City is Mine (Outro)" (featuring 3D) [produced with Ant Beatz]

=== 2014 ===
DJ Folk – The Folk Tape: The Ascension

- 23. Big Sean - "Thank You"

Young Money - Rise of an Empire

- 09. "Fresher Than Ever" (featuring Gudda Gudda, Jae Millz, Flow, Mack Maine and Birdman)

=== 2015 ===
Oba Rowland - Found One

- 03. "Around"

Two-9 - B4FRVR

- 03. "Verified"

=== 2016 ===
Icewear Vezzo - Moon Walken

- 14. "Nobody" (featuring Kiki Alexandra)

G. Twilight - My Ghetto Love Stories: Cancer Loves Taurus

- 30. "A Whole Lotta Something's Goin' On" (featuring Deli Rowe)

Seven the General - Svengali

- 09. "Consent Degree"

=== 2017 ===
Future - FUTURE

- 20. "Extra Luv" (featuring YG)

Rick Ross - Rather You Than Me

- 12. "Triple Platinum" (featuring Scrilla)

G. Twilight - The Science Behind the Game

- 05. "Addicted Dealer"

CyHi the Prynce - No Dope On Sundays

- 01. "Amen (Intro)"

Ras Kass - Year End Closeout

- 13. "AmeriKKKan Horror Story, Pt. 1 & 2" (produced with Nottz)

=== 2018 ===
Tee Grizzley - Activated

- 14. "Robbin"

Noveliss - Cerebral Apex

- 10. "Thinking Out Loud"

=== 2019 ===
J. Stone - The Definition of Loyalty

- 07. "Mind on a Million" (featuring Curren$y)

Ras Kass - Soul on Ice 2

- 03. "Midnight Sun" (featuring CeeLo Green)

=== 2020 ===
Curtis Williams - Zip Skylark II: The Wrath of Danco

- 01. "On It"
- 13. "Fuck Em"

=== 2021 ===
Lloyd Banks - The Course of the Inevitable

- 05. "Death by Design" (co-produced with Motif Alumni)
