= Special (SZA song) =

Song by SZA

from the album SOS
- Written: 2022
- Released: December 9, 2022
- Recorded: 2022
- Genre: Folk-pop
- Length: 2:38
- Label: Top Dawg; RCA
- Songwriters: Solána Rowe; Benjamin Levin; Shellback; Blake Slatkin; Omer Fedi; Rob Bisel
- Producers: Benny Blanco; Blake Slatkin; Shellback; Omer Fedi

Lyric video
- "Special" on YouTube

"Special" is a song by American singer-songwriter SZA from her second studio album, SOS (2022).

== Background ==
SZA released her debut studio album, Ctrl, in 2017. Primarily an R&B album that deals with themes like heartbreak, Ctrl received widespread acclaim for SZA's vocals and the eclectic musical style, as well as the relatability, emotional impact, and confessional nature of the songwriting. The album brought SZA to mainstream fame, and critics credit it with establishing her status as a major figure in contemporary pop and R&B music and pushing the boundaries of the R&B genre. (Note: Cited to Vulture, The Recording Academy, The Line of Best Fit, NME, The Daily Telegraph, The New Yorker, and Consequence) Her next studio album was therefore highly anticipated, and she alluded to its completion as early as August 2019 during an interview with DJ Kerwin Frost.

From April to May 2022, SZA told media outlets that she had recently finished the album in Hawaii and said that it was coming soon. Wanting to prove her versatility, she revealed her vision for the album involved an amalgamation of various disparate musical styles: "a little bit of everything". It would incorporate the "traditional" R&B sound that had been a staple of SZA's past works, alongside tracks of a more stripped-back and acoustic nature.

== Composition and lyrics ==
SZA had begun working on the second studio album, SOS (2022), by 2019, but some tracks were written and recorded in 2022 alongside a number of other songs due to bursts of productivity from time pressure. Carter Lang, one of SOS's producers, commented, "that's when [we] started feeling like, hey, 'We gotta do this shit like, it's been some years.' We bottled up that energy and everything was just sort of a preparation for that moment. The track "Special" was among those recorded in 2022.

"Special" is a folk-pop acoustic ballad, built around guitars and chiming melodies from a keyboard. The lyrics are self-deprecating and explore feelings such as jealousy and body dysmorphia. In the first verse, SZA critiques her body, lamenting her dry skin and the "pimples where [her] beauty marks should be", and envies "the girl from the Gucci store", who owns haute couture clothes and does not need to wear makeup. She sings of contradictory desires and needs: to be skinny and curvaceous, to be an "art piece" and an "ordinary girl", and to be given attention and be left alone. Kyle Denis of Billboard wrote that the song can be placed within the context of misogynoir, prejudice against Black women, because it reflects the insecurities and self-hate that make it difficult for Black women in particular to find fulfilling romantic relationships.

The song's central theme is about giving one's best to the wrong person and, in turn, feeling hollow and left behind in a failing relationship. It is addressed to a former lover, whom the narrator deems a loser who has made her feel like a loser too, despite giving them "all [her] special".

Critics observed melodic and lyrical similarities between "Special" and the song "Creep" (1993) by Radiohead, noting that the songs resembled each other by their use of guitars and themes of self-hatred. The "I wish I was special" line from the chorus of "Special" can be found in the pre-chorus of "Creep". (Note: The pre-chorus and chorus of "Creep" has the lyrics "I wish I was special / You're so fucking special / But I'm a creep / I'm a weirdo / What the hell am I doing here?") Rob Bisel, another of SOS's producers, acknowledged the comparisons in a podcast interview with Rolling Stone in December 2022, where he described "Creep" as a "subconscious" influence. He said: "The thought crossed my mind as we were recording it, but I didn't want to necessarily create a creative speed bump or set a creative agenda by pointing that out and addressing it." Other critics likened the songwriting in "Special" to SZA's 2017 single "Drew Barrymore", which contains similarly self-conscious lyrics such as "I'm sorry I'm not more attractive / I'm sorry I'm not more ladylike/ I'm sorry I don't shave my legs at night," as well as the works of Taylor Swift.

== Personnel ==
Adapted from the liner notes of SOS

Recording and management

- Engineered at 555 Studio Pee Pee Palace (Los Angeles), Cosmonaut (Vancouver), and Westlake Studios A, D, and Production Room (Los Angeles)
- Mixed at MixStar Studios (Virginia Beach)
- Mastered at Becker Mastering (Pasadena)

Personnel

- Solána Rowe (SZA) – lead vocals, background vocals, songwriting
- Benjamin Levin (Benny Blanco) – background vocals, songwriting, production, instrumentation, keyboards, programming, engineering
- Shellback – songwriting, production (for MXM), instrumentation, programming
- Blake Slatkin – songwriting, production, instrumentation, keyboards, guitar, programming
- Omer Fedi – songwriting, production, instrumentation, keyboards, programming
- Rob Bisel – background vocals, songwriting, engineering
- Dave "Spanks" Schwerkolt – engineering
- Jeremy Dilli – assistant engineering
- Syd Tagle – assistant engineering
- Hayden Duncan – assistant engineering
- Serban Ghenea – mixing
- Bryce Bordone – engineering (for mix)
- Dale Becker – mastering
- Katie Harvey – assistant mastering
- Noah McCorkle – assistant mastering

== Charts ==
Weekly chart performance for "Special"
Chart (2022)	Peak position
Australia (ARIA)	47
Canada Hot 100 (Billboard)	38
Global 200 (Billboard)	49
UK Audio Streaming (OCC)	80
US Billboard Hot 100	37
US Hot R&B/Hip-Hop Songs (Billboard)	16

== Certifications ==
Certifications for "Special"
Region	Certification	Certified units/sales
Canada (Music Canada)	Platinum	80,000^{‡}
New Zealand (RMNZ)	Gold	15,000^{‡}
United States (RIAA)	Platinum	1,000,000^{‡}
^{‡} Sales+streaming figures based on certification alone.
