= List of Billboard Pop Airplay number-one songs of 2021 =

This is a list of songs which reached number one on the Billboard Pop Airplay chart in 2021.

During 2021, a total of 13 singles hit number-one on the charts.

== Chart history ==
Key
†	Indicates best-performing song of 2021

Issue date	Song	Artist(s)	Ref.
January 2	"Positions"	Ariana Grande	
January 9	"Positions"	Ariana Grande	
January 16	"Positions"	Ariana Grande	
January 23	"Positions"	Ariana Grande	
January 30	"Positions"	Ariana Grande	
February 6	"Positions"	Ariana Grande	
February 13	"34+35"	Ariana Grande	
February 20	"34+35"	Ariana Grande	
February 27	"34+35"	Ariana Grande	
March 6	"Drivers License"	Olivia Rodrigo	
March 13	"Drivers License"	Olivia Rodrigo	
March 20	"Drivers License"	Olivia Rodrigo	
March 27	"Drivers License"	Olivia Rodrigo	
April 3	"Drivers License"	Olivia Rodrigo	
April 10	"Therefore I Am"	Billie Eilish	
April 17	"Therefore I Am"	Billie Eilish	
April 24	"Save Your Tears"	The Weeknd	
May 1	"Save Your Tears"	The Weeknd	
May 8	"Save Your Tears"	The Weeknd	
May 15	"Save Your Tears"	The Weeknd	
May 22	"Peaches"	Justin Bieber featuring Daniel Caesar and Giveon	
May 29	"Peaches"	Justin Bieber featuring Daniel Caesar and Giveon	
June 5	"Peaches"	Justin Bieber featuring Daniel Caesar and Giveon	
June 12	"Peaches"	Justin Bieber featuring Daniel Caesar and Giveon	
June 19	"Levitating" †	Dua Lipa featuring DaBaby	
June 26	"Levitating" †	Dua Lipa featuring DaBaby	
July 3	"Levitating" †	Dua Lipa featuring DaBaby	
July 10	"Kiss Me More"	Doja Cat featuring SZA	
July 17	"Montero (Call Me by Your Name)"	Lil Nas X	
July 24	"Good 4 U"	Olivia Rodrigo	
July 31	"Good 4 U"	Olivia Rodrigo	
August 7	"Good 4 U"	Olivia Rodrigo	
August 14	"Good 4 U"	Olivia Rodrigo	
August 21	"Good 4 U"	Olivia Rodrigo	
August 28	"Good 4 U"	Olivia Rodrigo	
September 4	"Stay"	The Kid Laroi and Justin Bieber	
September 11	"Stay"	The Kid Laroi and Justin Bieber	
September 18	"Stay"	The Kid Laroi and Justin Bieber	
September 25	"Stay"	The Kid Laroi and Justin Bieber	
October 2	"Stay"	The Kid Laroi and Justin Bieber	
October 9	"Stay"	The Kid Laroi and Justin Bieber	
October 16	"Stay"	The Kid Laroi and Justin Bieber	
October 23	"Stay"	The Kid Laroi and Justin Bieber	
October 30	"Stay"	The Kid Laroi and Justin Bieber	
November 6	"Stay"	The Kid Laroi and Justin Bieber	
November 13	"Stay"	The Kid Laroi and Justin Bieber	
November 20	"Industry Baby"	Lil Nas X and Jack Harlow	
November 27	"Stay"	The Kid Laroi and Justin Bieber	
December 4	"Stay"	The Kid Laroi and Justin Bieber	
December 11	"Easy on Me"	Adele	
December 18	"Easy on Me"	Adele	
December 25	"Easy on Me"	Adele	

== See also ==
- 2021 in American music
