= Free Crack 3 =

Mixtape by Lil Bibby
- Released: November 27, 2015
- Recorded: 2014–15
- Genre: Hip hop; drill; trap
- Label: Grade A Productions
- Producer: Southside; Metro Boomin; Ryu; Jusakid; Mike DZL; Jake One; Da Internz; C-Sick; Young Chop; Don Rob; OZ; Habib; Samm Busy; Pro Logic

Lil Bibby chronology
Free Crack 2 (2014)	Free Crack 3 (2015)	Big Buckz (2016)

Singles from Free Crack 3
- 1. "Word Around Town" Released: 2015

Free Crack 3 is the third mixtape by American rapper Lil Bibby, released on November 27, 2015.

== Background ==
Free Crack 3 is the third and final mixtape of the Free Crack series. A follow-up to the series, FC3: The Epilogue, has since been announced.

The mixtape features guest appearances from Lil Herb, Future, Common, R. Kelly, Jeremih, among others. The production was handled by Metro Boomin, Southside, and Young Chop, among others.

== Singles ==
Free Crack 3 was supported by one single, "Word Around Town".

== Critical response ==
Pitchfork noted that "as he expands his range of guests, his lyrical ability leveled up significantly" and that "Bibby has found success mostly by sticking to the program that got him here: consistent quality".

Vibe noted that "on FC3, Bibby keeps his authentic momentum moving forward" and that "Since arriving on the hip-hop scene, Bibby has consistently proven that he has a promising career ahead of him with his profound reality raps and steady supply of music".

Professional ratings
Review scores
Source	Rating
Vibe	4/5
Pitchfork	6.1/10

== Track list ==
No.	Title	Producer(s)	Length
1.	"Intro (Skit)"		1:33
2.	"Word Around Town"	Southside	3:41
3.	"Aww Man" (featuring Future)	Metro Boomin	2:58
4.	"Ain't Heard 'Bout You/Kill Sh*t, Pt. 2" (featuring Lil Herb)	Ryu; Jusakid	3:38
5.	"EBT to BET (Snippet)"	Mike DZL	2:00
6.	"Speak To Em" (featuring Common)	Jake One	5:28
7.	"Arab Buddy (Skit)"		0:50
8.	"Misunderstood" (featuring R. Kelly & Jeremih)	Da Internz	3:13
9.	"If He Find Out" (featuring Tink & Jacquees)	C-Sick	3:15
10.	"Made Nigga"	Young Chop; ChopsquadDJ	3:23
11.	"Came From Nothing"	C-Sick	2:59
12.	"Things Will Get Brighter"	Don Rob; OZ	3:25
13.	"I Can't Lie"	Habib; Samm Busy	2:59
14.	"Bibby Speaks (Interlude)"		2:10
15.	"Killin' Me"	Pro Logic	3:29
