= Save Your Tears =

2020 single by the Weeknd

- Fortnite jam track cover

Single by the Weeknd

from the album After Hours
- Released: August 9, 2020
- Recorded: July 2019
- Studio: Conway, MXM (Los Angeles, California); Jungle City (New York, New York); House Mouse Studios, MXM (Stockholm, Sweden)
- Genre: Synth-pop; synth-rock
- Length: 3:37
- Label: XO; Republic
- Songwriters: Abel Tesfaye; Ahmad Balshe; Jason Quenneville; Max Martin; Oscar Holter
- Producers: Max Martin; Oscar Holter; The Weeknd

The Weeknd singles chronology
"Smile" (2020)	"Save Your Tears" (2020)	"Over Now" (2020)

Music video
- "Save Your Tears" on YouTube

"Save Your Tears" is a song by the Canadian singer-songwriter the Weeknd from his fourth studio album, After Hours (2020). It was released to Dutch contemporary hit radio on August 9, 2020, as the album's fifth and final single. The song was written and produced by the Weeknd, Max Martin, and Oscar Holter, with Belly and DaHeala receiving additional writing credits.

In the United States, the solo version peaked at number four on the US Billboard Hot 100. A remix with American singer Ariana Grande was released on April 23, 2021, and propelled the song to number one on the Hot 100, marking both artists' sixth number-one single on the chart. This also made After Hours the first album since Drake's Scorpion in 2018 to have three singles from the same album to reach number one. The song has since been certified triple platinum by the Recording Industry Association of America.

"Save Your Tears" was the best-selling global single of 2021, earning 2.15 billion subscription streams equivalents globally according to the International Federation of the Phonographic Industry (IFPI). "Save Your Tears" and its remix with Grande peaked at number one in 18 countries and reached the top ten in 33 others. In the Weeknd's native country Canada, the remix peaked at number one on the Canadian Hot 100, where it became both the Weeknd and Grande's sixth chart-topper. The remix also peaked at number one on the Billboard Global 200, becoming the Weeknd's first number-one single on the chart and Grande's second.

== Lyrics and composition ==
This song was composed of C Major with an Allegro moderato tempo of 118 beats per minute. The vocals span from the low note of G_{3} to the high note of A_{4}.

Complex's Joyce Ng summarized the song's production as "an array of bright synths and ominous melodies." The song's lyrics explore themes of heartbreak, the Weeknd acknowledging he broke someone's heart "like someone did to [his]".

== Critical reception ==
Billboard hailed the song as the best track on After Hours, stating: "Although 'Save Your Tears' is one of the most pop-driven songs on the album, the Weeknd doesn't hold back when it comes to the rather cold nature he usually finds himself adopting when it comes to his lovers. The production remains upbeat and steady the entire time, thanks to work from Max Martin, Oscar Holter, DaHeala, and The Weeknd himself, combining the best of his old content and some newer, more mainstream-driven sounds". Craig Jenkins of Vulture raved, "The Weeknd perfects the kitschy '80s genre experiment with 'Save Your Tears', a gutting breakup tune gorgeous and simple enough to stand alongside peak '80s pop like the Cars' 'You Might Think' (and slick enough to swipe a bit of melody from Wham!'s 'Everything She Wants' in the chorus). The piece concocts sound informed by both trap and dance music, encased in dense atmospherics, and heavy on crisp, bright keys". "'Save Your Tears' has both tonal echoes of Depeche Mode's melancholy and a nod to 'Everything She Wants' by Wham!, exhibiting shimmery mid-80s luxuriance", praised The New York Times editor Jon Caramanica.

Slant columnist Seth Wilson observed, "'Save Your Tears' revels in spite, flaunting how over-it Tesfaye is in front of his ex while teasing the possibility of reconciliation. Tesfaye's distinct brand of R&B consistently draws from other genres, but hearing him embrace a straight-up synth-rock sound here is an exciting change of pace". "He draws on synth-pop nostalgia to mirror the tragic glitz of '80s Hollywood: the plinking synths and slick hand-claps of 'Save Your Tears' evokes a long-lost Wham! track. His bleeding-heart melodies and unforgettable hooks remind us why we keep listening to the '80s first place", exclaimed Pitchfork writer Isabella Herrera. Jem Aswad of Variety commented, "'Save Your Tears', which could have been an MTV staple in the early '80s, is begging for period-appropriate videos. The record has thwacking electronic percussion and the vocoder hearkening back to Electric Light Orchestra's 'Mr. Blue Sky'".

Mark Richardson from The Wall Street Journal asserted that "'Save Your Tears' includes soaring melodies that provide ample opportunity for Mr. Tesfaye to show off his vocal range, being used on television singing competitions. By design, it is big and broad, less specific lyrically and further from the shadowy persona at the heart of the Weeknd—Mr. Tesfaye often seems downright affable here. Mr. Martin and the Weeknd show the influence of 1980s synth pop. The piece sounds like something from a John Hughes soundtrack". Michael Cragg from Vogue UK praised the record as "the sort of synth experimentation last heard in 1984 on The NeverEnding Story soundtrack". GQ's Zak Maoui applauded "Save Your Tears" as one of the Weeknd's "best musical offerings to date". Apple Music applauded the composition, "Few things about 'Save Your Tears' mark it as a breakup song: For one, the production is drenched in bright, '80s-style synths that sound more glamorous than forlorn. Yet the Weeknd manages to imbue the single with a sense of heartbroken remorse, a rare emotion in his arsenal. Many came to love him through his more shadowy offerings, but there's no denying the power he brings to the nostalgic, splashy pop style he exhibits here". IFPI Chief Executive, Frances Moore has stated, "It has been another brilliant year for 'The Weeknd' and 'Save Your Tears' has unquestionably been one of the world's most loved songs."

== Accolades ==
Awards and nominations for "Save Your Tears"
Year	Organization	Award	Result	Ref.
2021	American Music Awards	Favorite Music Video	Nominated	
2021	MTV Millennial Awards	Global Hit of the Year	Nominated	
2021	MTV Video Music Awards	Video of the Year	Nominated	
2021	NRJ Music Awards	International Song of the Year	Nominated	
2021	UK Music Video Awards	Best Live Video	Nominated	
2022	ASCAP Pop Music Awards	Winning Songwriters & Publishers	Won	
2022	Brit Awards	International Song of the Year	Nominated	
2022	iHeartRadio Music Awards	Best Music Video	Nominated	
2022	iHeartRadio Titanium Awards	Best Music Video	Nominated	

== Commercial performance ==
Following the release of its parent album, "Save Your Tears" debuted at number 41 on the US Billboard Hot 100, dated April 4, 2020. The record reached number four, becoming the third top five hit from the album. On June 17, 2021, "Save Your Tears" was awarded a 3× Platinum certification from the Recording Industry Association of America (RIAA) for selling three million units in the United States. On April 24, the song reached number one on the Billboard Mainstream Top 40 chart, where it led for four consecutive weeks. On May 15, the song reached number one on Adult Pop Songs chart, where it led for 5 consecutive weeks.

In the singer's native country of Canada, "Save Your Tears" reached number 46 on the Canadian Hot 100 following its parent album's release. After its release as a single, it peaked at number two for five non-consecutive weeks. In the United Kingdom, "Save Your Tears" peaked at number 2 on the UK Singles Chart. In Australia, "Save Your Tears" peaked at number 3 on the ARIA Charts.

Globally, "Save Your Tears" was the best-selling global single of 2021, earning 2.15 billion subscription streams equivalents globally according to the International Federation of the Phonographic Industry (IFPI). It marked the Weeknd's second consecutive time achieving the global digital single award, following "Blinding Lights" in 2020. "Save Your Tears" was also the fifth best-selling global single of 2022 with 1.32 billion subscription streams equivalents. It was the thirteenth best-selling global single of 2023 with 1.19 billion subscription streams equivalents. It entered in almost every international music markets, and reached the summit for some of them, including Belgium, Croatia, Denmark, Iceland, Malaysia, Serbia, Singapore and Slovenia, top ten in Australia, Austria, Bolivia, Chile, Finland, France, Germany, Hungary, Italy, Norway, Portugal, Puerto Rico, Slovakia, Sweden and Switzerland, top twenty in Argentina, Ecuador, the Netherlands, Philippines, Spain and UAE and top thirty in South Africa.

== Music video ==
=== Background and synopsis ===
The official music video for "Save Your Tears" was first teased by the Weeknd as being on its way through his social media platforms on January 4, 2021. It was released the following day. Prosthetic Renaissance Makeup-FX Studio designer Mike Marino crafted the signature look resembling plastic surgery. The process commenced as he shaped a general sculpture of the Weeknd's modified visage, then created the prosthetics. Four primary prosthetic components were involved: one for each lip; one for the nose, eyebrows, and forehead; and one for the cheeks and chin. After they were applied to the Weeknd's face, makeup was utilized to make them blend in.

Directed by Cliqua, the video sees the Weeknd wearing a diamond-adorned version of his original red-jacketed outfit. The bruises on his face are no longer present, although his character has apparently undergone a bizarre plastic surgery. He performs in a lavish nightclub occupied by formally attired members wearing glittery, full-face masks that pay homage to scenes from Stanley Kubrick's final film, Eyes Wide Shut; his backing band is also wearing masks. He wanders out into the motionless, seated crowd, guzzling one person's champagne and laying his arm on the head of another until he notices a gorgeously brilliant, maskless woman in the audience (played by Bianca Rojas) and guides her onstage. While they initially are dancing joyfully, the camera soon reveals that the Weeknd is hiding a pistol behind his back. The lights go out and when the lights are turned back on, the Weeknd has placed his gun in one of her hands with him pointing the gun at his own head. The woman realizes this and shrieks. The scene concludes with the Weeknd holding the pistol to his own head. As the song finishes, he pulls the trigger, releasing confetti. The assembly applauds apprehensively at first, then enthusiastically.

=== Reception ===
Rolling Stone journalist Jon Blistein exclaimed, "The Weeknd delivers an exuberant rendition of 'Save Your Tears' to a lifeless, buttoned-up crowd all wearing party masks". Variety columnist Jen Aswad stated, "It's a fitting, more than slightly disturbing and suitably bizarre continuation in a series of highly unconventional promotional videos". Editor Starr Bowenbank of Cosmopolitan asserted, "The Weeknd continues to deliver high-quality content...and his newest offering, the music video for 'Save Your Tears' is no exception".

The aforementioned prosthetic led to the formation of memes and saw the Weeknd compared to Handsome Squidward. Hidden symbolism referencing the Grammys and the Weeknd's perceived Grammy snub was commented on by NME, who commented on fan speculation that the music video was deliberately throwing shade at the situation.

== Live performances ==
The song's debut live performance occurred during the American Music Awards of 2020 on November 22, 2020, where it was performed alongside the Kenny G remix of "In Your Eyes" in downtown Los Angeles. In his performance, the Weeknd sported a bandaged look that continued the narrative of the visuals that he released for After Hours.

In August 2020, the song was one of the tracks featured on TikTok's virtual concert: The Weeknd Experience. It served as the AR livestream's closing track. On February 7, 2021, "Save Your Tears" was performed halfway through Tesfaye's performance at the Super Bowl LV halftime show at Raymond James Stadium in Tampa. On May 11, 2021, the Weeknd performed "Save Your Tears" at the Brit Awards, wearing a sailor-style raincoat, and "crooning" the song in a brightly lit, sparse box as thunder and lightning raged above him. Toward the end of the song, he wandered out of the box to finish singing in the rain.

== Personnel ==
Credits adapted from Billboard.

- The Weeknd – vocals, production, programming, keyboards, bass, guitar, drums
- Max Martin – production, programming, keyboards, bass, guitar, drums
- Oscar Holter – production, programming, keyboards, bass, guitar, drums
- Michael Ilbert – engineering
- Sam Holland – engineering
- Shin Kamiyama – engineering
- Cory Bice – engineering assistant
- Jeremy Lertola – engineering assistant
- Sean Klein – engineering assistant
- Serban Ghenea – mixing
- John Hanes – engineering for mixing
- Dave Kutch – mastering
- Kevin Peterson – mastering

Ariana Grande remix - additional credits

- Ariana Grande - vocals, production, vocal production, engineering

== Charts ==
=== Weekly charts ===
Chart performance for "Save Your Tears"
Chart (2020–2025)	Peak position
Argentina Hot 100 (Billboard)	14
Australia (ARIA)	3
Austria (Ö3 Austria Top 40)	4
Belarus Airplay (TopHit)	122
Belgium (Ultratop 50 Flanders)	1
Belgium (Ultratop 50 Wallonia)	1
Brazil Hot 100 (Billboard)	90
Bolivia (Monitor Latino)	9
Canada Hot 100 (Billboard)	2
Canada AC (Billboard)	3
Canada CHR/Top 40 (Billboard)	1
Canada Hot AC (Billboard)	2
Chile (Monitor Latino)	2
CIS Airplay (TopHit)	3
Croatia (HRT)	1
Czech Republic Airplay (ČNS IFPI)	6
Czech Republic Singles Digital (ČNS IFPI)	4
Denmark (Tracklisten)	1
Ecuador (Monitor Latino)	17
El Salvador (Monitor Latino)	7
Estonia (Eesti Tipp-40)	23
Euro Digital Song Sales (Billboard)	1
Finland (Suomen virallinen lista)	3
France (SNEP)	6
Germany (GfK)	5
Global 200 (Billboard)	2
Greece International (IFPI)	5
Honduras (Monitor Latino)	9
Hong Kong (Billboard)	16
Hungary (Rádiós Top 40)	1
Hungary (Single Top 40)	3
Hungary (Stream Top 40)	3
Iceland (Tónlistinn)	1
India International Singles (IMI)	6
Ireland (IRMA)	2
Israel International Airplay (Media Forest)	1
Italy (FIMI)	4
Japan Hot Overseas (Billboard Japan)	5
Kazakhstan Airplay (TopHit)	69
Latvia (EHR)	1
Lithuania (AGATA)	1
Malaysia (RIM)	1
MENA (IFPI)	19
Mexico Airplay (Billboard)	1
Netherlands (Dutch Top 40)	16
Netherlands (Single Top 100)	15
New Zealand (Recorded Music NZ)	9
Norway (VG-lista)	3
Philippines (Billboard)	15
Philippines (Philippines Hot 100)	92
Poland Airplay (ZPAV)	1
Poland (Polish Streaming Top 100)	56
Portugal (AFP)	3
Puerto Rico (Monitor Latino)	7
Romania (Airplay 100)	5
Russia Airplay (TopHit)	5
San Marino (SMRRTV Top 50)	2
Serbia (Radiomonitor)	1
Singapore (RIAS)	1
Slovakia Airplay (ČNS IFPI)	5
Slovakia Singles Digital (ČNS IFPI)	4
Slovenia (SloTop50)	1
South Africa (RISA)	25
Spain (Promusicae)	16
Sweden (Sverigetopplistan)	3
Switzerland (Schweizer Hitparade)	3
Ukraine Airplay (TopHit)	163
UAE (IFPI)	19
UK Singles (Official Charts)	2
UK Hip Hop/R&B (Official Charts)	1
Uruguay (Monitor Latino)	8
US Billboard Hot 100	4
US Adult Contemporary (Billboard)	2
US Adult Pop Airplay (Billboard)	1
US Dance Airplay (Billboard)	8
US Pop Airplay (Billboard)	1
US Rhythmic Airplay (Billboard)	6
US Rolling Stone Top 100	4
Venezuela (Record Report)	32
Vietnam (Billboard Vietnam Hot 100)	11

=== Monthly charts ===
Monthly chart performance for "Save Your Tears"
Chart (2021)	Peak position
CIS Airplay (TopHit)	6
Czech Republic (Rádio – Top 100)	9
Czech Republic (Singles Digitál Top 100)	6
Russia Airplay (TopHit)	7
Slovakia (Rádio – Top 100)	10
Slovakia (Singles Digitál Top 100)	6

=== Year-end charts ===
2020 year-end chart performance for "Save Your Tears"
Chart (2020)	Position
Netherlands (Dutch Top 40)	73

2021 year-end chart performance for "Save Your Tears"
Chart (2021)	Position
Argentina Airplay (Monitor Latino)	1
Australia (ARIA)	8
Austria (Ö3 Austria Top 40)	6
Belgium (Ultratop Flanders)	1
Belgium (Ultratop Wallonia)	1
Bolivia (Monitor Latino)	10
Chile (Monitor Latino)	2
CIS Airplay (TopHit)	10
Costa Rica (Monitor Latino)	25
Croatia (ARC Top 100)	1
Denmark (Tracklisten)	2
Ecuador (Monitor Latino)	25
El Salvador (Monitor Latino)	25
France (SNEP)	6
Germany (Official German Charts)	5
Global Singles (IFPI)	1
Honduras (Monitor Latino)	25
Hungary (Rádiós Top 40)	3
Hungary (Single Top 40)	13
Hungary (Stream Top 40)	9
Ireland (IRMA)	5
Italy (FIMI)	27
Mexico (AMPROFON)	1
Mexico (Monitor Latino)	2
Netherlands (Single Top 100)	18
New Zealand (Recorded Music NZ)	16
Norway (VG-lista)	5
Panama (Monitor Latino)	12
Paraguay (Monitor Latino)	68
Poland (ZPAV)	5
Portugal (AFP)	2
Puerto Rico (Monitor Latino)	10
Russia Airplay (TopHit)	19
Spain (PROMUSICAE)	30
Sweden (Sverigetopplistan)	5
Switzerland (Schweizer Hitparade)	3
UK Singles (OCC)	4
Uruguay (Monitor Latino)	6
US Adult Contemporary (Billboard)	8
US Adult Top 40 (Billboard)	3
US Dance/Mix Show Airplay (Billboard)	11
US Mainstream Top 40 (Billboard)	3
US Rhythmic (Billboard)	35
Venezuela (Monitor Latino)	25

2022 year-end chart performance for "Save Your Tears"
Chart (2022)	Position
Australia (ARIA)	15
Austria (Ö3 Austria Top 40)	41
Belgium (Ultratop 50 Flanders)	155
Belgium (Ultratop 50 Wallonia)	165
CIS Airplay (TopHit)	154
Denmark (Tracklisten)	35
France (SNEP)	46
Germany (Official German Charts)	51
Global Singles (IFPI)	5
Hungary (Stream Top 40)	99
Lithuania (AGATA)	61
Netherlands (Single Top 100)	82
New Zealand (Recorded Music NZ)	27
Sweden (Sverigetopplistan)	44
Switzerland (Schweizer Hitparade)	21
UK Singles (OCC)	37
Vietnam (Vietnam Hot 100)	18

2023 year-end chart performance for "Save Your Tears"
Chart (2023)	Position
Australia (ARIA)	32
Denmark (Tracklisten)	86
Global Singles (IFPI)	13
Netherlands (Single Top 100)	84
New Zealand (Recorded Music NZ)	42
Poland (Polish Streaming Top 100)	65
Switzerland (Schweizer Hitparade)	46
UK Singles (OCC)	55

2024 year-end chart performance for "Save Your Tears"
Chart (2024)	Position
Australia (ARIA)	66
France (SNEP)	90
Portugal (AFP)	92

2025 year-end chart performance for "Save Your Tears"
Chart (2025)	Position
Argentina Anglo Airplay (Monitor Latino)	26
Belarus Airplay (TopHit)	190
France (SNEP)	137

== Certifications ==
Certifications for "Save Your Tears"
Region	Certification	Certified units/sales
Australia (ARIA)	16× Platinum	1,120,000^{‡}
Austria (IFPI Austria)	3× Platinum	90,000^{‡}
Belgium (BRMA)	Platinum	40,000^{‡}
Brazil (Pro-Música Brasil)	6× Diamond	960,000^{‡}
Canada (Music Canada)	Diamond	800,000^{‡}
Denmark (IFPI Danmark)	5× Platinum	450,000^{‡}
France (SNEP)	Diamond	333,333^{‡}
Germany (BVMI)	2× Platinum	800,000^{‡}
Italy (FIMI)	5× Platinum	500,000^{‡}
New Zealand (RMNZ)	8× Platinum	240,000^{‡}
Poland (ZPAV)	Diamond	250,000^{‡}
Portugal (AFP)	Diamond	250,000^{‡}
Spain (Promusicae)	4× Platinum	240,000^{‡}
United Kingdom (BPI)	5× Platinum	3,000,000^{‡}
United States (RIAA)	Diamond	10,000,000^{‡}
Streaming
Greece (IFPI Greece)	4× Platinum	8,000,000^{†}
Worldwide	—	4,660,000,000
^{‡} Sales+streaming figures based on certification alone.^{†} Streaming-only figures based on certification alone.

== Release history ==
Release history and formats for "Save Your Tears"
Region	Date	Format(s)	Label(s)	Ref.
Netherlands	August 9, 2020	Contemporary hit radio	Universal	
France	October 9, 2020	Contemporary hit radio	Universal	
Italy	November 6, 2020	Contemporary hit radio	Universal	
United States	November 24, 2020	Contemporary hit radio	XO; Republic	
United States	November 24, 2020	Rhythmic contemporary	XO; Republic	
United States	January 11, 2021	Hot adult contemporary	XO; Republic	

== OPN remix ==
The first official remix of "Save Your Tears" was created by Oneohtrix Point Never (OPN) and is included in the original deluxe edition of After Hours and the remix EP After Hours (Remixes). Salvatore Maicki of The Fader praised the collaboration: "On the OPN remix of 'Save Your Tears', they meet in the middle, igniting a technicolor spectacle".

== Ariana Grande remix ==
"Save Your Tears" (remix)

Single by the Weeknd and Ariana Grande

from the album After Hours (Deluxe)
- Released: April 23, 2021
- Recorded: March 2021
- Studio: Conway (Los Angeles, California); Jungle City (New York, New York); House Mouse Studios (Stockholm, Sweden)
- Genre: Synth-pop; synth-rock
- Length: 3:11
- Label: XO; Republic
- Songwriters: Abel Tesfaye; Ahmad Balshe; Jason Quenneville; Max Martin; Oscar Holter; Ariana Grande
- Producers: Max Martin; Oscar Holter; The Weeknd; Ariana Grande

The Weeknd singles chronology
"Hawái" (remix) (2020)	"Save Your Tears" (remix) (2021)	"You Right" (2021)

Ariana Grande singles chronology
"Met Him Last Night" (2021)	"Save Your Tears" (remix) (2021)	"It Was a... (Masked Christmas)" (2021)

Music video
- "Save Your Tears" (remix) on YouTube

The second remix of "Save Your Tears", a collaboration with American singer-songwriter Ariana Grande, was released on April 23, 2021, with an accompanying animated music video depicting Grande as a gynoid in the process of automated assembly. It was included on the deluxe version of the Weeknd's fourth studio album After Hours. The song marks the third collaboration between the Weeknd and Grande, after "Love Me Harder" (2014) and "Off the Table" (2020).

The remix was a commercial success in the United States, peaking at number one on the Billboard Hot 100 for two weeks. It became the sixth number-one single on the chart for both artists, and made After Hours the first album since Drake's Scorpion in 2018 to have three singles from the same album to reach number one. The remix ranked as the second best-performing song of the year on the year-end Hot 100 chart of 2021. In the Weeknd's native country Canada, it peaked at number one on the Billboard Canadian Hot 100, where it became both the Weeknd and Grande's sixth chart-topper. The remix also topped the Billboard Global 200, marking the Weeknd's first number-one single on the chart and Grande's second.

=== Critical reception ===
Billboard staff member Katie Atkinson complimented, "Ariana Grande brings her ethereal vocals to the song". "The Weeknd and Ariana Grande's third collaboration will have you smiling all year long", Billboard journalist Gab Ginsberg exclaimed. Natalia Barr of The Wall Street Journal hailed it as one of the best new pop records, "the two singers have reunited on an updated piece from the Weeknd's new wave-inspired album from last year, After Hours. Grande adds her sultry vocals to the song's second verse and chorus". NME columnist Will Lavin noted, "Grande adds a fresh and husky verse of her own to the remix".

Monica Sisavat from PopSugar described the remix as pure perfection, "Let's just say their voices together are just chef's kiss." "The pair's vocals intermingle on the wistful, synth-laden track as they harmonize," Rolling Stone editor Althea Legaspi stated. Apple Music celebrated the composition, "'Save Your Tears' is just as dreamy and lush as the 2020 original, but Grande's vocal acrobatics lend it a new dynamic—it's a duet now, two former lovers looking up at the same night sky, talking back and forth at a distance".

=== Accolades ===
Awards and nominations for "Save Your Tears" (remix)
Year	Organization	Award	Result	Ref(s)
2021	American Music Awards	Favorite Pop Song	Nominated	
2021	MTV Millennial Awards Brazil	International Collaboration	Nominated	
2021	MTV Europe Music Awards	Best Collaboration	Nominated	
2021	NRJ Music Awards	International Collaboration of the Year	Nominated	
2022	Billboard Music Awards	Top Global 200 Song	Nominated	
2022	Billboard Music Awards	Top Global (Excl. US) Song	Nominated	
2022	Billboard Music Awards	Top Hot 100 Song	Nominated	
2022	Billboard Music Awards	Top Collaboration	Nominated	
2022	Billboard Music Awards	Top Streaming Song	Nominated	
2022	Billboard Music Awards	Top Radio Song	Nominated	

=== Commercial performance ===
Following the release of the remix with Ariana Grande, "Save Your Tears" reached the top of the Billboard Hot 100 on the issue dated May 8, 2021. It became the sixth number-one hit of both the Weeknd and Grande (the latter of whom was credited on the track on the chart for the first time, as the remix drew the majority of the title's overall activity in the tracking week). Additionally, it also topped the Billboard Digital Song Sales chart, becoming Grande's eighth and the Weeknd's sixth chart-topping single. With eight number-one singles each, Grande joined Lady Gaga as a female artist with the fifth-most number-one singles on the Billboard Digital Song Sales Chart.

The Weeknd also became the first artist since Drake to earn three number-one singles from one album following his recent singles from After Hours, "Heartless" and "Blinding Lights" reaching number one. He also became the first artist to have three number ones from one album in three different years since Janet Jackson's album Janet Jackson's Rhythm Nation 1814. Joining Paul McCartney, Grande became just the second act and the first woman to earn three number-one duets in Billboard Hot 100 history. This was also Grande's third number-one duet within a year's span making her the artist with the fastest accumulation of three chart-topping duets. It remained at number one for a second consecutive week, drawing 22.4 million streams, 68.5 million radio airplay and 9,600 downloads on the week ending May 9, 2021. On the Rolling Stone Top 100 Songs chart, the song peaked at number 2 following the release of the Ariana Grande remix.

Following the release of the remix with Grande, the song also peaked at the top spot of the Billboard Global 200, becoming the Weeknd's first and Grande's second number-one single. It also became the first male-female duet to reach the number one position. Joining BTS, Grande became just the second act and the first woman to earn multiple number-one hits on the Billboard Global 200 Chart. Joining Drake, Justin Bieber and BTS, Grande also became just the fourth act and the first woman to earn at least four top ten hits on Billboard Global 200 survey. Additionally, it reached a new peak of number two on the Billboard Global Excl. U.S. chart. "Save Your Tears" has spent 27 weeks in the top ten of the Billboard Hot 100.

In the singer's native country of Canada, "Save Your Tears" rose to number one following the release of the Ariana Grande remix on the issue dated May 8, 2021, becoming the sixth number one hit of both the Weeknd and Grande. It became the second chart-topper from the parent album After Hours, after its biggest hit single "Blinding Lights". Additionally, it also topped the Canadian Digital Songs Sales chart.

=== Live performances ===
On May 27, 2021, the Weeknd performed the "Save Your Tears" remix featuring Grande at the iHeartRadio Music Awards. The musician was dressed in a sleek black suit against a glittery background. Later, Grande appeared in a silky purple gown. According to Billboard "she dazzled alongside the Weeknd before adorning the bridge with her whistle notes." The artists concluded in a dual arranged chorus finale.

=== Charts ===
==== Weekly charts ====
Chart performance for "Save Your Tears" (remix)
Chart (2021–2025)	Peak position
Argentina Hot 100 (Billboard)	8
Brazil (Top 100 Brasil)	91
Canada Hot 100 (Billboard)	1
CIS Airplay (TopHit)	43
Croatia (HRT)	1
Estonia Airplay (TopHit)	147
Finland (Suomen virallinen lista)	12
Global 200 (Billboard)	1
Greece International (IFPI)	5
India International Singles (IMI)	4
Japan Hot Overseas (Billboard Japan)	3
Latvia (EHR)	7
Lithuania (AGATA)	7
Norway (VG-lista)	13
Panama (PRODUCE)	37
Romania Airplay (TopHit)	116
Russia Airplay (TopHit)	57
South Korea (Gaon)	194
US Billboard Hot 100	1
US Rolling Stone Top 100	2

==== Monthly charts ====
Monthly chart performance for "Save Your Tears" (remix)
Chart (2021)	Peak position
CIS Airplay (TopHit)	49
Russia Airplay (TopHit)	68

==== Year-end charts ====
2021 year-end chart performance for "Save Your Tears" (remix)
Chart (2021)	Position
Brazil Airplay (Crowley)	93
Brazil Streaming (Pro-Música Brasil)	157
Canada (Canadian Hot 100)	2
Global 200 (Billboard)	2
India International Singles (IMI)	10
US Billboard Hot 100	2

2022 year-end chart performance for "Save Your Tears" (remix)
Chart (2022)	Position
Canada (Canadian Hot 100)	42
Global 200 (Billboard)	10
US Billboard Hot 100	40

2023 year-end chart performance for "Save Your Tears" (remix)
Chart (2023)	Position
Global 200 (Billboard)	15
Sweden (Sverigetopplistan)	78

2024 year-end chart performance for "Save Your Tears" (remix)
Chart (2024)	Position
Global 200 (Billboard)	23
Philippines (Philippines Hot 100)	90

2025 year-end chart performance for "Save Your Tears" (remix)
Chart (2025)	Position
Global 200 (Billboard)	28
Lithuania Airplay (TopHit)	156

=== Certifications ===
Certifications for "Save Your Tears" (remix)
Region	Certification	Certified units/sales
New Zealand (RMNZ)	5× Platinum	150,000^{‡}
Norway (IFPI Norway)	4× Platinum	240,000^{‡}
Spain (Promusicae)	Platinum	60,000^{‡}
Streaming
Greece (IFPI Greece)	2× Platinum	4,000,000^{†}
Sweden (GLF)	6× Platinum	48,000,000^{†}
^{‡} Sales+streaming figures based on certification alone.^{†} Streaming-only figures based on certification alone.

=== Release history ===
Release history and formats for "Save Your Tears" (remix)
Region	Date	Format(s)	Label(s)	Ref.
Various	April 23, 2021	Digital download; streaming	XO; Republic	

== See also ==
- List of Billboard Global 200 number ones of 2021
- List of Billboard Argentina Hot 100 top-ten singles in 2021
- List of Australian top-ten singles of 2021
- List of Ultratop 50 number-one singles of 2021
- List of Canadian Hot 100 number-one singles of 2021
- List of number-one hits of 2021 (Denmark)
- List of number-one songs of 2021 (Malaysia)
- List of number-one singles of 2021 (Poland)
- List of number-one songs of 2021 (Singapore)
- List of number-one singles of 2021 (Slovenia)
- List of UK top-ten singles of 2021
- List of Billboard Hot 100 number-one singles of 2021
- List of Adult Top 40 number-one songs of the 2020s
- List of Billboard Mainstream Top 40 number-one songs of 2021
- List of highest-certified singles in Australia
