= List of number-one singles of 2021 (Slovenia) =

SloTop50 singles 2021

List of the Slovenian number-one singles of 2021 compiled by SloTop50, is the official chart provider of Slovenia. SloTop50 publishes weekly charts once a week, every Sunday. Chart contain data generated by the SloTop50 system according to any song played during the period starting the previous Monday morning at time 00:00:00 and ending Sunday night at 23:59:59.

== Charts ==
=== Number-one singles by week ===
Weekly charted #1 songs and highest charted counting among domestic songs only

No.	Week	Issue date	Number one	Artist	Top domestic song	Top domestic artist
re	419	10 January 2021	"Head & Heart"	Joel Corry ft. MNEK	"Meni dobro je"	Jan Plestenjak
re	420	17 January 2021	"Head & Heart"	Joel Corry ft. MNEK	"Meni dobro je"	Jan Plestenjak
re	421	24 January 2021	"Head & Heart"	Joel Corry ft. MNEK	"Meni dobro je"	Jan Plestenjak
re	422	31 January 2021	"Head & Heart"	Joel Corry ft. MNEK	"Meni dobro je"	Jan Plestenjak
re	423	7 February 2021	"Head & Heart"	Joel Corry ft. MNEK	"Največ"	Klara Jazbec
re	424	14 February 2021	"Head & Heart"	Joel Corry ft. MNEK	"Največ"	Klara Jazbec
re	425	21 February 2021	"Head & Heart"	Joel Corry ft. MNEK	"Največ"	Klara Jazbec
re	426	28 February 2021	"Head & Heart"	Joel Corry ft. MNEK	"Največ"	Klara Jazbec
re	427	7 March 2021	"Head & Heart"	Joel Corry ft. MNEK	"Največ"	Klara Jazbec
re	428	14 March 2021	"Head & Heart"	Joel Corry ft. MNEK	"Največ"	Klara Jazbec
90	429	21 March 2021	"Save Your Tears"	The Weeknd	"Medena"	Pop Design
90	430	28 March 2021	"Save Your Tears"	The Weeknd	"Medena"	Pop Design
90	431	4 April 2021	"Save Your Tears"	The Weeknd	"Medena"	Pop Design
90	432	11 April 2021	"Save Your Tears"	The Weeknd	"Dobr' gre"	Maraaya
90	433	18 April 2021	"Save Your Tears"	The Weeknd	"Ko si z mano"	Nino Ošlak
90	434	25 April 2021	"Save Your Tears"	The Weeknd	"Ko si z mano"	Nino Ošlak
90	435	2 May 2021	"Save Your Tears"	The Weeknd	"Dobr' gre"	Maraaya
90	436	9 May 2021	"Save Your Tears"	The Weeknd	"Romeo in Julija 2021"	Flirt
90	437	16 May 2021	"Save Your Tears"	The Weeknd	"Romeo in Julija 2021"	Flirt
90	438	23 May 2021	"Save Your Tears"	The Weeknd	"Romeo in Julija 2021"	Flirt
90	439	30 May 2021	"Save Your Tears"	The Weeknd	"Romeo in Julija 2021"	Flirt
90	440	6 June 2021	"Save Your Tears"	The Weeknd	"Imela sva vse"	Wolf
90	441	13 June 2021	"Save Your Tears"	The Weeknd	"Imela sva vse"	Wolf
90	442	20 June 2021	"Save Your Tears"	The Weeknd	"Zgoraj je nebo"	Jan Plestenjak ft. Coto
