= Free Crack 2 =

Mixtape by Lil Bibby
- Released: August 29, 2014
- Recorded: 2013–14
- Genres: Hip hop; drill
- Length: 54:45
- Label: Grade A Productions
- Producers: DJ L; Bangladesh; Brannu; Goose; Mitch; C-Biz; Juicy J; Awree; Crazy Mike; Needlz; Donut; P-Lo; Sak Pase; Kane; DJ Pain 1; Honorable C.N.O.T.E.; Black Metaphor; Sonny Digital; Cash Money AP

Lil Bibby chronology
Free Crack (2013)	Free Crack 2 (2014)	Free Crack 3 (2015)

Singles from Free Crack 2
- 1. "Dead or in Prison" Released: 2014

Free Crack 2 is the second mixtape by American rapper Lil Bibby. It was released on August 29, 2014. The mixtape is hosted by DJ Drama.

== Background ==
Free Crack 2 is the second mixtape of the Free Crack series, following Bibby's debut mixtape Free Crack.

The mixtape features guest appearances from Lil Herb, Kevin Gates, Wiz Khalifa, T.I., and Juicy J. The production was handled by DJ L, Black Metaphor, and Sonny Digital, among others.

== Singles ==
Free Crack 2 was supported by one single, "Dead or In Prison".

The music video for "We Are Strong", featuring Kevin Gates, was released on October 27, 2014. The music video for "Dead or in Prison" was released on January 19, 2015. On April 9, 2015, the music video for "Boy" featuring T.I was released.

== Critical response ==
Professional ratings
Review scores
Source	Rating
HipHopDX	3/5 stars

Upon its release, Free Crack 2 received generally positive reviews from critics.

XXL magazine awarded the mixtape an XL, praising the mixtape's authenticity, catchy hooks and production, while also commenting that the mixtape showcases Bibby's "growth as an artist."

RedEye awarded the mixtape three stars out of four, commenting on the tape's maturity and versatility and praising the ability of the song 'Dead or in Prison' to let Bibby's "emotion and natural charisma do the heavy lifting."

BET gave the mixtape a positive review, awarding it five stars while commenting on its "new level of depth and introspection, detailing the difficult balance of fame and authenticity and how that effects everyday life in some of America's urban war zones."

HipHopDX noted that "Every now and then, Free Crack 2 drifts into bizarre, unfamiliar territory. Instead of doing what he knows best, steadily and consistently, he veers into a weird, untested generic type of status rap. When in his pocket, however, Bibby is as menacing as ever, and Free Crack 2 provides its fair share of dark and intricate street rap. The Chicagoan seems most at home rapping side-by-side with emcees of his like, namely Lil Herb and Kevin Gates."

== Track listing ==
No.	Title	Producer(s)	Length
1.	"Birdman Intro"	DJ L	1:41
2.	"Can I Have Your Attention"	Bangladesh; Brannu	3:06
3.	"For The Low Pt. 2" (featuring Wiz Khalifa & Juicy J)	Goose	4:32
4.	"Game Over" (featuring Lil Herb)	DJ L	2:29
5.	"I Love To Hustle"	Mitch	1:06
6.	"Dead or In Prison"	C-Biz	3:36
7.	"Montana" (featuring Juicy J)	Juicy J; Awree; Crazy Mike	3:19
8.	"Can I Get"	Needlz; Donut	3:28
9.	"Ace And Lulu"		1:34
10.	"Boy" (featuring T.I.)	P-Lo	3:54
11.	"I Be On It"	Sak Pase	3:33
12.	"What You Live For"	Kane	3:54
13.	"Ace, Rico, Calvin"		0:57
14.	"We Are Strong" (featuring Kevin Gates)	DJ Pain 1	4:10
15.	"Tomorrow"	Honorable C.N.O.T.E.	2:30
Total length:			54:45

Bonus tracks
No.	Title	Producer(s)	Length
16.	"Water (Remix)" (featuring Jadakiss & Anthony Hamilton)	Black Metaphor	3:44
17.	"Hispanic" (featuring Zuse & Rock City)	Sonny Digital	3:31
18.	"We Made It"	Cash Money AP	3:41
Total length:			54:45
