= Joy (Australian musician) =

Australian musician

JOY.
- Born: Olivia McCarthy; 1998 (age 27–28); Brisbane, Australia
- Origin: Brisbane
- Genres: Pop, R&B, electronic
- Instruments: Piano, vocals, guitar
- Label: Sony Music Australia

Olivia McCarthy, known professionally as JOY., (born 1998) is an Australian musician, singer, and Record producer from Brisbane. She supported Tkay Maidza on tour in 2015. Olivia is signed to Sony Music Australia and was the main support for Demi Lovato's Tell Me You Love Me World Tour on the European leg in 2018. She was originally discovered through Triple J Unearthed.

== Discography ==
=== Extended plays ===
List of EPs, with release date, label, and selected chart positions shown
Title	Details	Peak chart positions
Title	Details	AUS
Ode	Released: 28 August 2015; Label: Joy (independent); Formats: Digital download, streaming	—
Six	Released: 2 March 2018; Label: Sony Music Australia; Formats: Digital download, streaming	85

=== Singles ===
==== As lead artist ====
Title	Year	Album
"Captured"	2014	Non-album singles
"Stone"	2014	Non-album singles
"Weather"	2015	Non-album singles
"About Us"	2015	Ode
"Like Home"	2016	Non-album single
"Smoke Too Much"	2017	Six
"Change"	2018	Six
"Can't Be You"	2019	Non-album singles
"Diamond"	2019	Non-album singles
"Anime"	2020	Portal
"Waterfalls"	2020	Portal
"Out of Love"	2021	Portal
"Alone on the Moon"	2022	Portal
"Think About It"	2022	Portal

==== As featured artist ====
Title	Year	Peak chart positions	Album
Title	Year	AUS	Album
"My Favourite Downfall" (360 featuring JOY.)	2016	70	Non-album single
