= Tell Me Why (The Kid Laroi song) =

2020 single by the Kid Laroi

Single by the Kid Laroi

from the album F*ck Love
- Released: 17 July 2020
- Genre: Emo rap
- Length: 3:15
- Label: Grade A; Columbia
- Songwriters: Charlton Howard; Tanner Katich; Henry Nichols; Rio Leyva; Danny Snodgrass, Jr.; Maxwell Nichols
- Producers: OkTanner; Pharaoh Vice; Leyva; Taz Taylor; MJNichols

The Kid Laroi singles chronology
"Go" (2020)	"Tell Me Why" (2020)	"Need You Most (So Sick)" (2020)

Music video
- "Tell Me Why" on YouTube

"Tell Me Why" (stylised in all caps) is a song by Australian rapper and singer the Kid Laroi, released on 17 July 2020 as the second single from his debut mixtape F*ck Love (2020). An accompanying music video was released on the same day. The song was produced by OkTanner, Pharaoh Vice, Rio Leyva, Taz Taylor and MJNichols, and is a tribute to American rapper Juice Wrld.

== Composition ==
In the song, the Kid Laroi sings about his heartbreak of losing his friend and mentor, fellow rapper Juice Wrld, who died in December 2019. In emotional distress, he looks for answers and asks, "Tell me why, tell me why it's so hard to say goodbye" and "Watch all of my idols die, right in front of my eyes".

== Charts ==
Chart performance for "Tell Me Why"
Chart (2020)	Peak position
Australia (ARIA)	49
Australia Hip Hop/R&B (ARIA)	15
Canada Hot 100 (Billboard)	86
Ireland (IRMA)	77
New Zealand Hot Singles (RMNZ)	3
US Bubbling Under Hot 100 (Billboard)	4

== Certifications ==
Certifications for "Tell Me Why"
Region	Certification	Certified units/sales
Australia (ARIA)	Platinum	70,000^{‡}
Canada (Music Canada)	Platinum	80,000^{‡}
New Zealand (RMNZ)	Gold	15,000^{‡}
United States (RIAA)	Platinum	1,000,000^{‡}
^{‡} Sales+streaming figures based on certification alone.
