= King Louie (rapper) =

American rapper from Chicago

- Also known as: King L
- Born: Louis King Johnson Jr. December 27, 1987 (age 38); Chicago, Illinois, U.S.
- Genres: Midwestern hip-hop; drill
- Years active: 2006–present
- Labels: Epic; M.U.B.U Gang
- Website: kinglmusic.com

Louis King Johnson, Jr. (born December 27, 1987), better known by his stage name King Louie (or King L), is an American rapper. Spin magazine attributed King Louie as being one of the Chicago rappers who made Chicago the "hottest hip-hop" scene in 2012.

== Early life ==
King Louie was born Louis King Johnson Jr. in the Eastside of Chicago, Illinois, on December 27, 1987. He attended Hyde Park Academy High School for a while before graduating from alternative school.

== Career ==
After attending high school, King Louie began building a following through one-on-one mixtapes. He would hand out CDs at bus stops and parties. King Louie released his debut mixtape titled Boss Shit in September 2007, and the next year released his second mixtape Cloud 9 in December 2009.

However, his career was put on hold after he was hit by a car. He was hospitalized with both his legs broken with various other injuries and had to learn to walk again after his injuries were healed. He later returned to music, releasing a series of mixtapes that he made available online. Songs from his releases received regular air time, including his song "Too Cool" which was placed in regular rotation at WGCI-FM. To promote his mixtapes, King Louie launched a series of music videos on YouTube. His first video was for the song "I'm Arrogant" which was the lead track from his 2010 mixtape Man Up, Band Up. He released additional music videos and quickly grew a large following. It was his promotional methods on YouTube that helped him be one of the newer Chicago rappers to get noticed nationally.

In 2012, during a trip to Los Angeles, California, Louie met and signed with Epic Records. While on his trip, Kanye West's record label GOOD Music released a remix of a song by Chicago hip-hop artist Chief Keef. During the release, West took time to mention numerous other up and coming artists, including Louie. King Louie was later quoted on MTV's Sucker Free program that he was shocked and not aware that West was a fan. He would later appear on West's Yeezus, performing a verse and the hook on the track "Send It Up". He was shot in the head in Chicago on December 23, 2015, and survived the shooting.

== Discography ==
- Boss Shit (2007)
- Cloud 9 (2008)
- Man Up Band Up (2010)
- More Boss Shit (2011)
- Chiraq Drillinois (2011)
- Hardbody The Mixtape with Bo$$ Who & Sno Boy (2011)
- #ManUpBandUp Pt.1 (2011)
- Man Up Band Up 2 (2011)
- The Motion Picture (2012)
- Showtime (2012)
- Drilluminati (2012)
- March Madness (2013)
- Jeep Music (2013)
- Drilluminati 2 (2013)
- Soprano (2014)
- Tony (2014)
- Drilluminati 3: God of Drill (2015)
- 6 God Tony (2015)
- Play Dat Again (2015)
- Featuring Tony (2016)
- Tony 2 (2016)
- Life With Louie (2022)

=== Guest appearances ===
List of non-single guest appearances, with other performing artists, showing year released and album name
Title	Year	Other artist(s)	Album
"Fucked Up"	2012	Chin Chilla Meek, Shawnna	It Feels Good To Be Great
"Money Mayweather"	2012	Chin Chilla Meek	It Feels Good To Be Great
"Touch Em"	2012	Bo Deal, Trouble	The Chicago Code 2
"How We Do"	2012	Rockie Fresh	Driving 88
"I Get Money"	2012	Lil Durk	I'm Still A Hitta
"I Get Paid"	2012	Lil Durk	I'm Still A Hitta
"Winning"	2012	Chief Keef	Back From The Dead
"Screamin"	2012	Soulja Boy, Chief Keef	—N/a
"Flat Line"	2012	Chief Keef	—N/a
"Just Be Cool"	2012	Fredo Santana	It's a Scary Site
"Got Myself"	2012	Fredo Santana	It's a Scary Site
"Conceited" (Remix)	2012	SD	Life Of A Savage
"Koolin"	2013	DJ Victorious, Twista	—N/a
"My Niggaz"	2013	HearonTrackz	Drilluminati, IV: XX: The Chicago Ghetto D
"Pop Out"	2013	Katie Got Bandz	Drillary Clinton
"2 The Moon (Send It Up)"	2013	HearonTrackz	Buck 50z & Jay's: The Chicago Ghetto D
"Send It Up"	2013	Kanye West	Yeezus
"Bitches and Bottles"	2013	Lil Durk	—N/a
"Shout Out"	2013	Lil Bibby, Lil Herb	Free Crack
"Another Day"	2014	Lil Herb	Welcome to Fazoland
"Chicago Conscious (Remix)"	2014	Reem, Lil Herb, Spenzo	—N/a
"Differences"	2015	HearonTrackz, Slitta	Tony IV: XX: The Chicago Ghetto D
"Faneto (Remix)"	2015	Chief Keef, Lil Bibby, Lil Herb	—N/a

== See also ==
- List of Epic Records artists
