= Stunna Gambino =

American rapper (born 2001)

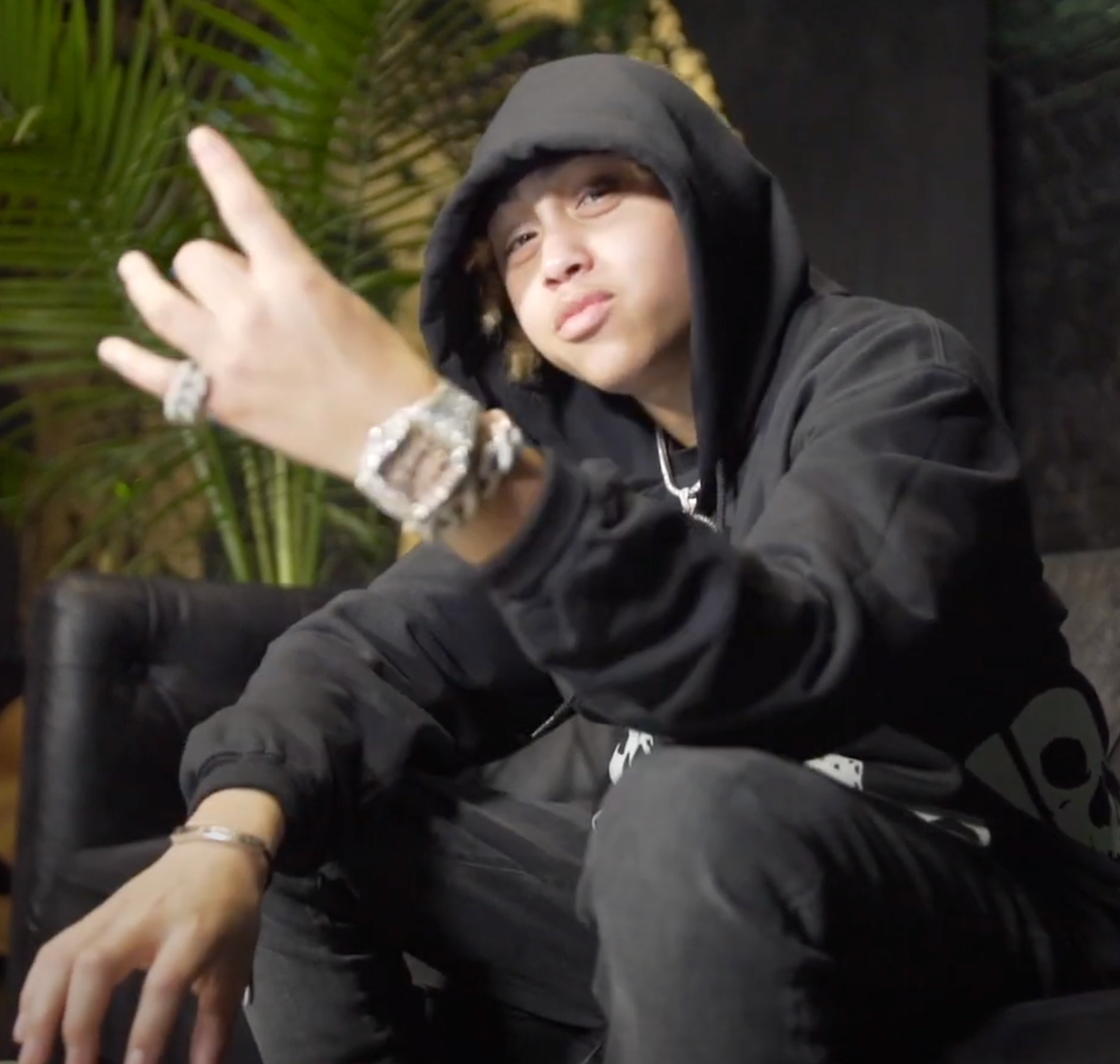
- Stunna Gambino in July 2021

Background information
- Born: Isaias Elijah Garcia; October 22, 2001 (age 24); Washington Heights, New York City, U.S.
- Genres: Hip hop; trap; SoundCloud rap
- Occupations: Rapper; singer; songwriter
- Years active: 2013–present
- Labels: Grade A; RCA

Isaias Elijah Garcia (born October 21, 2001), known professionally as Stunna Gambino, is an American rapper, singer and songwriter. He is best known for his guest appearance alongside Polo G on the Kid Laroi's 2021 single "Not Sober," which peaked at number 41 on the Billboard Hot 100. He released his debut studio album, Vultures Don't Kry, on August 18, 2022. He has been described as a "SoundCloud rapper," as he built his following releasing music on the platform.He released his second studio album "Save Yo Tears,” on November 11, 2025. The deluxe version of the album was released on December 26, 2025.

== Career ==
Garcia began releasing music on SoundCloud at the age of 17. In 2019, he released the mixtape Underrated, which is described as being responsible for his breakthrough. In December 2020, he received unintentional support from American singer Rihanna who shared his song "Demons" on her Instagram story. In July 2021, he appeared on Australian singer The Kid Laroi's song "Not Sober" alongside American rapper Polo G. In August 2021, he released his single "Zaza". In February 2022, he released his single "Evil" and its accompanying music video. In July 2022, he released his single "Warzone", a collaboration with fellow New York City rapper A Boogie wit da Hoodie. In August 2022, he released his project Vultures Don't Kry.In November 2025, he released his second studio album "Save Yo Tears".

== Musical style ==
Robby Seabrook III, writing for XXL, describes Stunna Gambino's musical style in the following manner: "Stunna Gambino utilizes a kind of flow that cuts close to singing and back to rap, a sound that came to dominate New York City before drill became big." He cites American rappers Lil Durk and Roddy Ricch as his influences.

== Discography ==
=== Studio albums ===
Title	Album details
Vultures Don't Kry	Released: August 18, 2022; Label: Grade A, RCA; Format: LP, digital download, streaming
Save Yo Tears	• Released:11 November, 2025 • Label: Grade A, RCA •Format: LP, Digital download, streaming

=== Mixtapes ===
Title	Mixtape details
Underrated	Released: October 22, 2019; Label: Vultures Don't Kry; Format: Digital download, streaming

=== Extended plays ===
Title	EP details
Hood Files	Released: February 19, 2018; Label: Self-released; Format: Digital download, streaming

=== Charted songs ===
Title	Year	Peak chart positions								Certifications	Album
Title	Year	US	US R&B/HH	US Rap	AUS	CAN	IRE	NZ	UK	Certifications	Album
"Not Sober" (The Kid Laroi featuring Polo G and Stunna Gambino)	2021	41	14	10	8	22	43	21	42	MC: Gold	F*ck Love 3: Over You
