= So Done (The Kid Laroi song) =

2020 single by the Kid Laroi

Single by the Kid Laroi

from the album F*ck Love (Savage)
- Released: 23 October 2020
- Genre: Pop-rap
- Length: 2:07
- Label: Grade A; Columbia
- Songwriters: Charlton Howard; Khaled Rohaim; Omer Fedi
- Producers: Khaled Rohaim; Omer Fedi

The Kid Laroi singles chronology
"Hell Bent" (2020)	"So Done" (2020)	"My City" (2020)

Music video
- "So Done" on YouTube

"So Done" (stylised in all caps) is a song by Australian singer and rapper the Kid Laroi, released on 23 October 2020 as the first single (fourth overall) from the deluxe edition of Laroi's debut mixtape F*ck Love, released on 24 July 2020. The song was produced by Khaled Rohaim and Omer Fedi.

== Music video ==
In the Cole Bennett-directed music video, Laroi encounters his ex-girlfriend and her new boyfriend wherever he goes. The music video has more than 50 million views as of May 2025.

== Composition ==
So Done is similar to most of the songs on F*ck Love (Savage). The song is about how Laroi has been in broken relationships, that have not worked. Therefore, he notes that he is giving up on love and is not looking for a new girlfriend because he expects it to happen again.

== Chart performance ==
In the Kid Laroi's native Australia, "So Done" peaked at number six on the ARIA Singles Chart. On the US Billboard Hot 100, it peaked at number 59, becoming the Kid Laroi's third Hot 100 entry.

== Credits and personnel ==
Credits adapted from Tidal.

- The Kid Laroi – vocals, songwriting
- Khaled Rohaim – songwriting, production
- Omer Fedi – songwriting, production
- Donn Robb – record engineering
- Jon Castelli – mixing
- Josh Deguzman – assistant engineering
- Chris Gehringer - mastering

== Charts ==
=== Weekly charts ===
Weekly chart performance for "So Done"
Chart (2020–2021)	Peak position
Australia (ARIA)	6
Australia Hip Hop/R&B (ARIA)	2
Belgium (Ultratip Bubbling Under Flanders)	15
Canada Hot 100 (Billboard)	24
Canada CHR/Top 40 (Billboard)	31
Canada Hot AC (Billboard)	50
Czech Republic Airplay (ČNS IFPI)	72
Denmark (Tracklisten)	29
Global 200 (Billboard)	43
Ireland (IRMA)	23
Netherlands (Single Top 100)	80
New Zealand (Recorded Music NZ)	17
Norway (VG-lista)	4
Portugal (AFP)	76
Sweden (Sverigetopplistan)	38
UK Singles (OCC)	38
US Billboard Hot 100	59
US Hot Rap Songs (Billboard)	18
US Pop Airplay (Billboard)	23
US Rhythmic Airplay (Billboard)	20
US Rolling Stone Top 100	28

=== Year-end charts ===
Year-end chart performance for "So Done"
Chart (2020)	Position
Australian Artist (ARIA)	25
Chart (2021)	Position
Australia (ARIA)	28
Australia Hip Hop/R&B (ARIA)	10
Canada (Canadian Hot 100)	91

== Certifications ==
Certifications for "So Done"
Region	Certification	Certified units/sales
Australia (ARIA)	4× Platinum	280,000^{‡}
Brazil (Pro-Música Brasil)	Gold	20,000^{‡}
Canada (Music Canada)	2× Platinum	160,000^{‡}
Denmark (IFPI Danmark)	Gold	45,000^{‡}
New Zealand (RMNZ)	2× Platinum	60,000^{‡}
United Kingdom (BPI)	Gold	400,000^{‡}
United States (RIAA)	Platinum	1,000,000^{‡}
^{‡} Sales+streaming figures based on certification alone.

== Release history ==
Release dates and formats for "So Done"
Region	Date	Version	Label	Ref.
Various	23 October 2020	Digital download	Columbia	
United States	10 November 2020	Rhythmic radio	Columbia	
United States	1 December 2020	Contemporary hit radio	Columbia	
