= Lil Yachty discography =

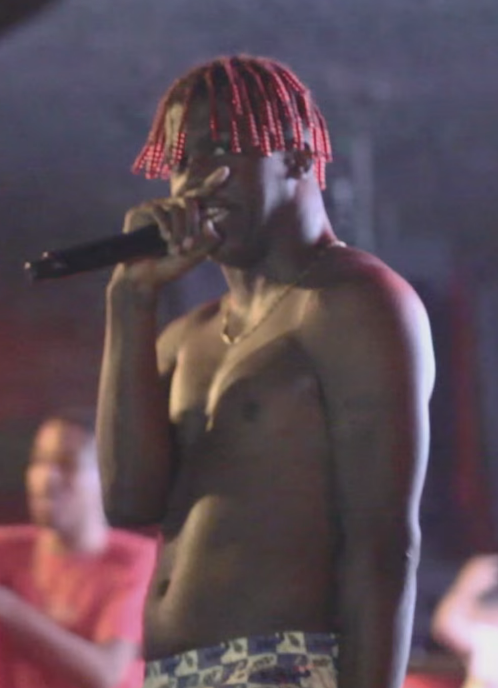
- Yachty performing in May 2016
- Studio albums: 5
- EPs: 10
- Singles: 32
- Music videos: 8
- Mixtapes: 3

The discography of American rapper Lil Yachty consists of five studio albums, three mixtapes, one collaborative mixtape, ten extended plays, ten music videos, thirteen guest appearances and thirty-two singles (including eighteen singles as a featured artist).

== Albums ==
=== Studio albums ===
List of studio albums, with selected details and chart positions
Title	Album details	Peak chart positions								Certifications
Title	Album details	US	US R&B/ HH	US Rap	AUS	CAN	FRA	NZ	UK	Certifications
Teenage Emotions	Released: May 26, 2017; Labels: Quality Control, Capitol, Motown; Formats: CD, LP, cassette, digital download, streaming	5	4	3	62	17	171	37	70	
Lil Boat 2	Released: March 9, 2018; Labels: Quality Control, Capitol, Motown; Formats: LP, streaming, digital download	2	2	2	36	7	79	23	44	RIAA: Gold
Nuthin' 2 Prove	Released: October 19, 2018; Labels: Quality Control, Capitol, Motown; Formats: CD, LP, digital download, streaming	12	9	8	62	17	—	—	81	
Lil Boat 3	Released: May 29, 2020; Labels: Quality Control, Capitol, Motown; Formats: CD, LP, digital download, streaming	14	11	10	—	21	165	—	—	
Let's Start Here	Released: January 27, 2023; Labels: Quality Control, Motown; Formats: LP, digital download, streaming	9	—	—	37	10	—	11	32	

=== Deluxe albums ===
List of deluxe albums, with date released
Title	Album details
Lil Boat 3.5 (Note: "Lil Boat 3.5" is also called Lil Boat 3 (Deluxe) – Lil Boat 3.5.)	Released: November 26, 2020; Label: Quality Control, Capitol, Motown; Format: Streaming, digital download

=== Collaborative albums ===
List of collaborative albums, with date released
Title	Album details
Bad Cameo (with James Blake)	Released: June 28, 2024; Label: Quality Control, Motown; Format: Streaming, digital download

== Extended plays ==
List of EPs, with selected details
Title	EP details	Peak chart positions
Title	EP details	US
Summer Songs	Released: August 22, 2015; Label: Self-released; Format: Digital download	—
Hey Honey, Let's Spend Wintertime On a Boat (with Wintertime)	Released: December 25, 2015; Label: Self-released; Format: Digital download	—
Big Boat (Big Bang Tributes) (with 88rising)	Released: August 2, 2016; Label: Self-released; Format: Digital download, streaming	—
Lil Boat's Birthday Mix	Released: August 23, 2016; Label: Self-released; Format: Digital download, streaming	—
The Lost Files (with Digital Nas)	Released: August 30, 2016; Label: Self-released; Format: Digital download, streaming	—
Birthday Mix 2.0	Released: August 23, 2017; Label: Self-released; Format: Digital download, streaming	—
Birthday Mix 3	Released: August 23, 2018; Label: Self-released; Format: Digital download, streaming	—
The Lost Files 2 (with Digital Nas)	Released: August 12, 2019; Label: Self-released; Format: Digital download, streaming	—
Birthday Mix 4	Released: August 23, 2019; Label: Self-released; Format: Digital download, streaming	—
Birthday Mix 5	Released: August 23, 2020; Label: Self-released; Format: Digital download, streaming	—
Birthday Mix 6	Released: August 23, 2021; Label: Quality Control, Capitol, Motown; Format: Digital download, streaming	—
Tesla	Released: August 25, 2023; Label: Quality Control, Capitol, Motown; Format: Digital download, streaming	180
The Secret Recipe	Released: September 29, 2023; Label: Quality Control, Capitol, Motown; Format: Digital download, streaming	170
Something Ether	Released: February 23, 2024; Label: Quality Control, Motown; Format: Digital download, streaming	—

== Mixtapes ==
List of mixtapes, with selected details and chart positions
Title	Album details	Peak chart positions				Certifications
Title	Album details	US	US R&B/ HH	US Rap	US Heat.	Certifications
Lil Boat	Released: March 9, 2016; Labels: Quality Control, Capitol, Motown; Format: CD, LP, digital download	106	—	—	12	RIAA: Gold
Summer Songs 2	Released: July 20, 2016; Labels: Quality Control, Capitol, Motown; Format: Digital download	197	44	—	23	
A-Team (with Zaytoven, Lil Keed and Lil Gotit)	Released: February 28, 2020; Label: Familliar Territory; Formats: Digital download, streaming	—	—	—	—	
Michigan Boy Boat	Released: April 23, 2021; Labels: Quality Control, Capitol, Motown; Format: Digital download, streaming	39	21	18	—	
"—" denotes a recording that did not chart.

== Singles ==
=== As lead artist ===
List of singles as lead artist, with selected chart positions and certifications
Title	Year	Peak chart positions										Certifications	Album
Title	Year	US	US R&B/ HH	AUS	AUT	CAN	IRE	NZ Hot	SWE	UK	WW	Certifications	Album
"One Night"	2016	49	18	—	—	—	—	—	—	—	—	RIAA: 2× Platinum; ARIA: Gold; RMNZ: Gold	Lil Boat
"Minnesota" (featuring Quavo, Skippa da Flippa, and Young Thug)	2016	— (Note: "Minnesota" did not enter the Billboard Hot 100, but peaked at number 21 on the Bubbling Under Hot 100 Singles chart, which acts as an extension to the Hot 100.)	— (Note: "Minnesota" did not enter the Hot R&B/Hip-Hop Songs chart, but peaked at number three on the Bubbling Under R&B/Hip-Hop Singles chart.)	—	—	—	—	—	—	—	—	RIAA: Platinum	Lil Boat
"Harley"	2017	—	—	—	—	—	—	—	—	—	—		Teenage Emotions
"Peek a Boo" (featuring Migos)	2017	78	33	—	—	73	—	—	—	—	—	RIAA: Platinum	Teenage Emotions
"Bring It Back"	2017	—	—	—	—	—	—	—	—	—	—		Teenage Emotions
"X Men" (featuring Evander Griiim)	2017	—	—	—	—	—	—	—	—	—	—		Teenage Emotions
"Ice Tray" (with Quality Control and Quavo)	2017	74	30	—	—	67	—	—	—	—	—	MC: Gold	Control the Streets, Vol. 1
"Who Want the Smoke?" (featuring Cardi B and Offset)	2018	— (Note: "Who Want the Smoke?" did not enter the Billboard Hot 100, but peaked at number nine on the Bubbling Under Hot 100 Singles chart, which acts as an extension to the Hot 100.)	— (Note: "Who Want the Smoke?" did not enter the Hot R&B/Hip-Hop Songs chart, but peaked at number five on the Bubbling Under R&B/Hip-Hop Singles chart.)	—	—	—	—	22	—	—	—	RIAA: Gold	Nuthin' 2 Prove
"Go Krazy, Go Stupid Freestyle"	2019	—	—	—	—	—	—	—	—	—	—		Non-album single
"Hightop Shoes" (with Lil Keed and Zaytoven)	2020	—	—	—	—	—	—	—	—	—	—		A-Team
"Oprah's Bank Account" (with DaBaby featuring Drake)	2020	55	32	93	—	38	—	3	—	54	—	RIAA: Platinum; ARIA: Gold; RMNZ: Gold	Lil Boat 3
"Split/Whole Time"	2020	— (Note: "Split/Whole Time" did not enter the Billboard Hot 100, but peaked at number seven on the Bubbling Under Hot 100 Singles chart, which acts as an extension to the Hot 100.)	49	—	—	—	—	30	—	—	—	RIAA: Gold	Lil Boat 3
"Not Regular" (with Sada Baby)	2020	—	—	—	—	—	—	—	—	—	—		Non-album singles
"Coffin"	2020	—	—	—	—	—	—	—	—	—	—	RIAA: Gold; RMNZ: Gold	Non-album singles
"Hit Bout It" (featuring Kodak Black)	2021	67	25	—	—	—	—	—	—	—	186		Non-album singles
"Love Music"	2021	—	—	—	—	—	—	—	—	—	—		Non-album singles
"Yae Energy"	2021	—	—	—	—	—	—	—	—	—	—		Non-album singles
"Poland"	2022	40	18	49	53	15	26	5	70	30	29	RIAA: Gold	Non-album singles
"Strike (Holster)"	2023	71	20	—	—	88	—	19	—	—	—	RIAA: Gold	Tesla
"Slide"	2023	—	—	—	—	—	—	32	—	—	—		Tesla
"Solo Steppin Crete Boy"	2023	—	48	—	—	—	—	21	—	—	—		Tesla
"Tesla"	2023	— (Note: "Tesla" did not enter the Billboard Hot 100, but peaked at number 21 on the Bubbling Under Hot 100 Singles chart, which acts as an extension to the Hot 100.)	44	—	—	—	—	22	—	—	—		Tesla
"The Secret Recipe" (with J. Cole)	2023	92	31	—	—	—	—	18	—	—	—		The Secret Recipe
"Gimme da Lite" (with Southside)	2023	—	—	—	—	—	—	29	—	—	—		Non-album single
"A Cold Sunday"	2024	87	31	—	—	—	—	40	—	—	—		Something Ether
"Something Ether"	2024	—	—	—	—	—	—	—	—	—	—		Something Ether
"Stayinit" (with Fred Again and Overmono)	2024	—	—	—	—	—	—	—	—	—	—	RMNZ: Gold	USB
"Lil Mega Minion"	2024	—	—	—	—	—	—	—	—	—	—		Despicable Me 4 (Original Motion Picture Soundtrack)
"Stupid" (with YG and Babyface Ray)	2024	—	—	—	—	—	—	—	—	—	—		TBA
"Lets Get On Dey Ass"	2024	—	—	—	—	—	—	—	—	—	—		TBA
"Hate Me" (with Ian)	2024	68	18	—	—	—	—	9	—	—	—		TBA
"Sorry Not Sorry" (with Veeze)	2024	99	22	—	—	—	—	—	—	—	—		TBA
"I Don't Care..." (with Lucki)	2025	—	49	—	—	—	—	—	—	—	—		TBA
"Rich Sinners" (with Skrilla)	2025	— (Note: "Rich Sinners" did not enter the Billboard Hot 100, but peaked at number 24 on the Bubbling Under Hot 100 chart, which acts as an extension to the Hot 100.)	35	—	—	—	—	—	—	—	—		TBA
"—" denotes a recording that did not chart or was not released in that territory.

=== As featured artist ===
List of singles as a featured artist, with showing year released, peak chart positions and album name
Title	Year	Peak chart positions									Certifications	Album
Title	Year	US	US R&B/ HH	US Rap	AUS	CAN	NLD	SWE	UK	UK R&B	Certifications	Album
"Broccoli" (DRAM featuring Lil Yachty)	2016	5	1	1	61	23	80	60	93	13	RIAA: Diamond; BPI: Gold; MC: 3× Platinum; RMNZ: 2× Platinum	Big Baby DRAM
"1500" (TheGoodPerry featuring Lil Yachty)	2016	—	—	—	—	—	—	—	—	—		Burberry Perry
"Mase in '97" (Carnage featuring Lil Yachty)	2016	—	—	—	—	—	—	—	—	—		Non-album singles
"Nada" (Leaf featuring Lil Yachty)	2016	—	—	—	—	—	—	—	—	—		Non-album singles
"Been Thru a Lot" (TM88 featuring Young Thug and Lil Yachty)	2016	—	—	—	—	—	—	—	—	—		Non-album singles
"After the Afterparty" (Charli XCX featuring Lil Yachty)	2016	—	—	—	30	—	—	—	29	—	ARIA: Gold; BPI: Gold	Non-album singles
"Dan Bilzerian" (T-Pain featuring Lil Yachty)	2016	—	—	—	—	—	—	—	—	—		Non-album singles
"iSpy" (Kyle featuring Lil Yachty)	2016	4	3	1	33	14	92	79	33	7	RIAA: Diamond; ARIA: 3× Platinum; BPI: Platinum; MC: 5× Platinum	Light of Mine
"From the D to the A" (Tee Grizzley featuring Lil Yachty)	2017	— (Note: "From the D to the A" did not enter the Billboard Hot 100, but peaked at number three on the Bubbling Under Hot 100 Singles chart.)	48	—	—	—	—	—	—	—	RIAA: 5× Platinum	Non-album single
"Hip Hopper" (Blac Youngsta featuring Lil Yachty)	2017	— (Note: "Hip Hopper" did not enter the Billboard Hot 100, but peaked at number 21 on the Bubbling Under Hot 100 Singles chart.)	— (Note: "Hip Hopper" did not enter the Hot R&B/Hip-Hop Songs chart, but peaked at number three on the Bubbling Under R&B/Hip-Hop Singles chart.)	—	—	—	—	—	—	—	RIAA: Gold	2.23
"Marmalade" (Macklemore featuring Lil Yachty)	2017	— (Note: "Marmalade" did not enter the Billboard Hot 100, but peaked at number one on the Bubbling Under Hot 100 Singles chart.)	39	—	82	49	—	—	—	—	RIAA: 2× Platinum; MC: Platinum	Gemini
"Faking It" (Calvin Harris featuring Kehlani and Lil Yachty)	2017	94	38	—	—	99	—	—	97	—	RIAA: Platinum; ARIA: Gold	Funk Wav Bounces Vol. 1
"Gucci Flip Flops" (Bhad Bhabie featuring Lil Yachty)	2018	79	39	—	—	62	—	—	—	—	RIAA: Platinum; BPI: Silver	15
"If You Were Mine" (Ocean Park Standoff featuring Lil Yachty)	2018	—	—	—	—	—	—	—	—	—		Summer Beach Vibes
"Solitaire" (Gucci Mane featuring Migos and Lil Yachty)	2018	— (Note: "Solitaire" did not enter the Billboard Hot 100, but peaked at number eight on the Bubbling Under Hot 100 Singles chart.)	—	—	—	—	—	—	—	—		Evil Genius
"Pretender" (Steve Aoki featuring Lil Yachty and AJR)	2018	—	—	—	—	—	—	—	—	—		Neon Future III
"Magic in the Hamptons" (Social House featuring Lil Yachty)	2018	— (Note: "Magic in the Hamptons" did not enter the Billboard Hot 100, but peaked at number 25 on the Bubbling Under Hot 100 Singles chart, which acts as an extension to the Hot 100.)	—	—	—	91	—	—	—	—	RIAA: Gold; BPI: Silver	Non-album single
"Told Me" (Co Cash featuring Lil Yachty)	2019	—	—	—	—	—	—	—	—	—		F.A.C.T.S.
"Way More Fun" (Asher Roth featuring Lil Yachty)	2020	—	—	—	—	—	—	—	—	—		Flowers on the Weekend
"Rocc Climbing" (Remble featuring Lil Yachty)	2021	—	—	—	—	—	—	—	—	—		Non-album singles
"Wocky My Lover" (Mak Sauce featuring Lil Yachty)	2021	—	—	—	—	—	—	—	—	—		Non-album singles
"Damn Homie" (yvngxchris featuring Lil Yachty)	2022	—	—	—	—	—	—	—	—	—		Virality
"Number 9" (Miguel featuring Lil Yachty)	2023	—	—	—	—	—	—	—	—	—		Non-album singles
"Half Doin Dope" (JID and BabyTron featuring Lil Yachty)	2023	—	—	—	—	—	—	—	—	—		Non-album singles
"Van Gogh" (JID featuring Lil Yachty)	2023	—	—	—	—	—	—	—	—	—		Non-album singles
"Fallout" (Lyrical Lemonade and Gus Dapperton featuring Lil Yachty and Joey Badass)	2024	—	—	—	—	—	—	—	—	—		All Is Yellow
"When We Die (Can We Still Get High?)" (Yungblud featuring Lil Yachty)	2024	—	—	—	—	—	—	—	—	—		Non-album singles
"Charlie" (Lola Young featuring Lil Yachty)	2024	—	—	—	—	—	—	—	—	—		Non-album singles
"Geekin" (Nemzzz featuring Lil Yachty)	2026	—	—	—	—	—	—	—	—	—		Locked In
"—" denotes a recording that did not chart or was not released in that territory.

=== Promotional singles ===
List of promotional singles, showing year released and album name
Title	Year	Album
"It Takes Two" (with Mike Will Made It and Carly Rae Jepsen)	2017	Non-album single

== Other charted and certified songs ==
List of other charted songs, with selected chart positions and certifications
Title	Year	Peak chart positions								Certifications	Album
Title	Year	US	US R&B/HH	US Rock	AUS	CAN	IRE	NZ Hot	WW	Certifications	Album
"Mixtape" (Chance the Rapper featuring Young Thug and Lil Yachty)	2016	— (Note: "Mixtape" did not enter the Billboard Hot 100, but peaked at number 10 on the Bubbling Under Hot 100 Singles chart, which acts as an extension to the Hot 100.)	48	—	—	—	—	—	—	RIAA: Gold	Coloring Book
"Forever Young" (featuring Diplo)	2017	—	—	—	—	—	—	—	—	RIAA: Gold	Teenage Emotions
"Boom!" (featuring Ugly God)	2018	88	43	—	—	—	—	—	—	RIAA: Gold	Lil Boat 2
"Oops" (featuring 2 Chainz and K Supreme)	2018	— (Note: "Oops" did not enter the Billboard Hot 100, but peaked at number 20 on the Bubbling Under Hot 100 Singles chart, which acts as an extension to the Hot 100.)	— (Note: "Oops" did not enter the Hot R&B/Hip-Hop Songs chart, but peaked at number nine on the Bubbling Under R&B/Hip-Hop Singles chart.)	—	—	—	—	—	—		Lil Boat 2
"Talk to Me Nice" (featuring Quavo)	2018	— (Note: "Talk to Me Nice" did not enter the Billboard Hot 100, but peaked at number 15 on the Bubbling Under Hot 100 Singles chart, which acts as an extension to the Hot 100.)	— (Note: "Talk to Me Nice" did not enter the Hot R&B/Hip-Hop Songs chart, but peaked at number seven on the Bubbling Under R&B/Hip-Hop Singles chart.)	—	—	—	—	—	—		Lil Boat 2
"She Ready" (featuring PnB Rock)	2018	— (Note: "She Ready" did not enter the Billboard Hot 100, but peaked at number 12 on the Bubbling Under Hot 100 Singles chart, which acts as an extension to the Hot 100.)	— (Note: "She Ready" did not enter the Hot R&B/Hip-Hop Songs chart, but peaked at number five on the Bubbling Under R&B/Hip-Hop Singles chart.)	—	—	—	—	— (Note: "She Ready" did not enter the NZ Top 40 Singles Chart, but peaked at number four on the NZ Heatseeker Singles Chart.)	—		Lil Boat 2
"NBAYoungBoat" (featuring YoungBoy Never Broke Again)	2018	63	31	—	—	—	—	—	—	RIAA: Platinum	Lil Boat 2
"Mickey" (featuring Offset and Lil Baby)	2018	— (Note: "Mickey" did not enter the Billboard Hot 100, but peaked at number seven on the Bubbling Under Hot 100 Singles chart, which acts as an extension to the Hot 100.)	— (Note: "Mickey" did not enter the Hot R&B/Hip-Hop Songs chart, but peaked at number two on the Bubbling Under R&B /Hip-Hop Singles chart.)	—	—	79	—	—	—	RIAA: Gold	Lil Boat 2
"Baby Daddy" (featuring Lil Pump and Offset)	2018	— (Note: "Baby Daddy" did not enter the Billboard Hot 100, but peaked at number 19 on the Bubbling Under Hot 100 Singles chart, which acts as an extension to the Hot 100.)	— (Note: "Baby Daddy" did not enter the Hot R&B/Hip-Hop Songs chart, but peaked at number eight on the Bubbling Under R&B/Hip-Hop Singles chart.)	—	—	—	—	—	—		Lil Boat 2
"66" (featuring Trippie Redd)	2018	73	36	—	—	74	—	— (Note: "66" did not enter the NZ Top 40 Singles Chart, but peaked at number three on the NZ Heatseeker Singles Chart.)	—	RIAA: Platinum	Lil Boat 2
"Get Dripped" (featuring Playboi Carti)	2018	98	49	—	—	—	—	33	—	RIAA: Platinum	Nuthin' 2 Prove
"Yacht Club" (featuring Juice Wrld)	2018	91	46	—	—	94	—	26	—	RIAA: 2× Platinum; ARIA: Gold; RMNZ: Gold	Nuthin' 2 Prove
"T.D" (with Tierra Whack featuring ASAP Rocky and Tyler, the Creator)	2020	83	34	—	—	—	—	11	—	RIAA: Gold	Lil Boat 3
"Pardon Me" (featuring Future and Mike Will Made It)	2020	—	—	—	—	—	—	—	—	RIAA: Gold	Lil Boat 3
"Flex Up" (with Future and Playboi Carti)	2020	— (Note: "Flex Up" did not enter the Billboard Hot 100, but peaked at number 11 on the Bubbling Under Hot 100 Singles chart, which acts as an extension to the Hot 100.)	37	—	—	—	—	25	—	RIAA: Gold	Lil Boat 3.5
"Ok Ok" (Kanye West featuring Lil Yachty and Rooga)	2021	12	5	—	—	22	—	—	—		Donda
"The Black Seminole"	2023	80	—	8	—	79	97	7	—		Let's Start Here
"The Ride"	2023	— (Note: "The Ride" did not enter the Billboard Hot 100, but peaked at number 17 on the Bubbling Under Hot 100 Singles chart, which acts as an extension to the Hot 100.)	—	15	—	—	—	16	—		Let's Start Here
"Running Out of Time"	2023	— (Note: "Running Out of Time" did not enter the Billboard Hot 100, but peaked at number 21 on the Bubbling Under Hot 100 Singles chart, which acts as an extension to the Hot 100.)	—	19	—	—	—	18	—		Let's Start Here
"Pretty"	2023	— (Note: "Pretty" did not enter the Billboard Hot 100, but peaked at number 16 on the Bubbling Under Hot 100 Singles chart, which acts as an extension to the Hot 100.)	—	14	—	—	—	20	—		Let's Start Here
"Failure"	2023	—	—	32	—	—	—	—	—		Let's Start Here
"The Zone"	2023	—	—	28	—	—	—	—	—		Let's Start Here
"We Saw the Sun!"	2023	—	—	31	—	—	—	—	—		Let's Start Here
"Drive Me Crazy!"	2023	—	—	21	—	—	—	—	—	RMNZ: Gold	Let's Start Here
"I've Officially Lost Vision!!!!"	2023	—	—	34	—	—	—	—	—		Let's Start Here
"Say Something"	2023	—	—	24	—	—	—	—	—		Let's Start Here
"Paint the Sky"	2023	—	—	37	—	—	—	—	—		Let's Start Here
"Should I B?"	2023	—	—	40	—	—	—	—	—		Let's Start Here
"The Alchemist"	2023	—	—	42	—	—	—	—	—		Let's Start Here
"Reach the Sunshine"	2023	—	—	43	—	—	—	—	—		Let's Start Here
"Another Late Night" (Drake featuring Lil Yachty)	2023	29	21	—	67	26	—	—	35		For All the Dogs
"Hatred" (The Kid Laroi featuring Lil Yachty)	2024	—	—	—	—	—	—	39	—		The First Time (deluxe)
"Fuck the Fame" (Rod Wave featuring Lil Baby and Lil Yachty)	2024	—	—	—	—	—	—	29	—		Last Lap
"—" denotes a recording that did not chart or was not released in that territory.

== Guest appearances ==
List of non-single guest appearances
Title	Year	Other artist(s)	Album
"Rari"	2016	Carnage, Famous Dex, Ugly God	Papi Gordo
"Hyenas"	2016	Bankroll Mafia	Bankroll Mafia
"I'm Crazy"	2016	Famous Dex, Rich the Kid	The Heartbreak Kid
"Monte"	2016	Post Malone	August 26th
"Mixtape"	2016	Chance the Rapper, Young Thug	Coloring Book
"Beautiful Day"	2016	TheGoodPerry, Kylie Jenner, Justine Skye, Jordyn Woods	Burberry Perry
"Truck Loads"	2016	Offset	Streets on Lock 3
"All Day"	2016	Chocolate Droppa, PnB Rock	Kevin Hart: What Now? (The Mixtape Presents Chocolate Droppa)
"I'll Be Damned"	2016	Hoodrich Pablo Juan, iLoveMakonnen	—N/a
"Bachelor"	2016	ASAP Mob, ASAP Rocky, MadeinTYO, Offset	Cozy Tapes Vol. 1: Friends
"Hasselhoff"	2017	Mike Will Made It	Ransom 2
"Bahamas"	2017	ASAP Mob, ASAP Rocky, ASAP Ferg, ASAP Twelvyy, Key!, Schoolboy Q, Smooky Margielaa	Cozy Tapes Vol. 2: Too Cozy
"Come On Now"	2017	Chief Keef	Dedication
"Back"	2017	Lil Pump	Lil Pump
"Guacamole"	2017	Nessly	Wildflower
"Do Not Disturb"	2018	Smokepurpp, Murda Beatz, Offset	Bless Yo Trap
"Cold Hearted"	2018	Renni Rucci	—N/a
"Wop Remix"	2018	Lil Keed	Keed Talk to 'Em
"Nostalgia"	2019	Giggs	Big Bad...
"Hoemita"	2019	Iggy Azalea	In My Defense
"Eastside"	2019	Lil Gnar	Fire Hazard
"Speed Me Up"	2020	Wiz Khalifa, Ty Dolla $ign, Sueco the Child	Sonic the Hedgehog
"Accomplishments"	2020	Lil Keed, Zaytoven	A-Team
"You Ain't Safe"	2020	Lil Keed, Lil Gotit, Zaytoven	A-Team
"Hightop Shoes"	2020	Lil Keed, Zaytoven	A-Team
"Meditation 2"	2020	Babyfather	Roaches 2012 - 2019 (Super Deluxe)
"Way More Fun"	2020	Asher Roth	Flowers on the Weekend
"Pretty Boy"	2020	Joji	Nectar
"E-ER"	2020	DJ Scheme, Danny Towers, Ski Mask the Slump God	Family
"Rule #1"	2021	DDG, OG Parker	Die 4 Respect
"Bank Teller"	2021	Lil Tecca	We Love You Tecca 2
"Ok Ok"	2021	Kanye West, Rooga	Donda
"Slime Them"	2022	Fivio Foreign	B.I.B.L.E.
"Boat Interlude"	2023	Veeze	Ganger
"Another Late Night"	2023	Drake	For All the Dogs
"Too Damn High"	2024	Kid Cudi	Insano
"Say Ya Grace"	2024	Lyrical Lemonade, Chief Keef	All Is Yellow
"Round n Round"	2024	Kid Cudi	Insano (Nitro Mega)
"It's Us"	2024	Nemzzz	Do Not Disturb (Deluxe)
"Point Me To It"	2024	Concrete Boys, Camo!	It's Us Vol. 1
"Playa Walkin"	2024	Concrete Boys, Dc2trill	It's Us Vol. 1
"LA Reid"	2024	Concrete Boys	It's Us Vol. 1
"Not Da 2"	2024	Concrete Boys, Karrahbooo	It's Us Vol. 1
"2 Hands 2 Eyes 10 Whips / Rent Due"	2024	Concrete Boys, Camo!, Draft Day, Karrahbooo, Dc2trill	It's Us Vol. 1
"M.O.B."	2024	Concrete Boys	It's Us Vol. 1
"Jeff & Lita"	2024	Concrete Boys, Karrahbooo	It's Us Vol. 1
"Die for Mine"	2024	Concrete Boys, Camo!, Karrahbooo, Dc2trill, Draft Day	It's Us Vol. 1
"Pimpin Aint Easy"	2024	Concrete Boys	It's Us Vol. 1
"On the Radar Concrete Cypher"	2024	Concrete Boys, Camo!, Karrahbooo, Dc2trill, Draft Day	It's Us Vol. 1
"Up Now"	2024	Mustard, BlueBucksClan, 42 Dugg	Faith of a Mustard Seed
"Hatred"	2024	The Kid Laroi	The First Time (Deluxe)
"Diamondz & Cash"	2024	Kevin Abstract, HVN	Glue
"Fuck the Fame"	2024	Rod Wave, Lil Baby	Last Lap

== Production discography ==
List of production (for other artists) and songwriting credits (excluding guest appearances, interpolations, and samples)
Track(s)	Year	Credit	Artist(s)	Album
1. "Act Up"	2018	Songwriter	City Girls	Girl Code
2. "Perfect"; (featuring City Girls)	2019	Songwriter	Cousin Stizz	Trying to Find My Next Thrill Ride
2. "City Girls"	2020	Songwriter	Chris Brown, Young Thug	Slime & B
2. "Skit"	2020	Songwriter	City Girls	City on Lock
3. "Jobs"	2020	Songwriter	City Girls	City on Lock
14. "Friendly"	2020	Songwriter	City Girls	City on Lock
"Scrub Tha Ground" (featuring Yung Miami)	2021	Songwriter	Quavo	Non-album single
"Twerkulator"	2021	Songwriter, additional vocals	City Girls	Non-album single
"Top Notch"	2022	Songwriter	City Girls, Fivio Foreign	Non-album single
2. "Major Distribution"	2022	Songwriter, additional vocals	Drake, 21 Savage	Her Loss
4. "BackOutsideBoyz"	2022	Producer (with Rio Leyva, Dez Wright, and Taz Taylor)	Drake, 21 Savage	Her Loss
5. "Privileged Rappers"	2022	Producer (with EarlonTheBeat, Gentuar Memishi, and 40)	Drake, 21 Savage	Her Loss
9. "Circo Loco"	2022	Songwriter, additional vocals	Drake, 21 Savage	Her Loss
10. "Pussy & Millions"; (featuring Travis Scott)	2022	Producer (with Cheeze Beatz, Go Grizzly, Squat Beats, and B100)	Drake, 21 Savage	Her Loss
13. "Jumbotron Shit Poppin"	2022	Producer (with F1lthy, Cubeatz, and SadPony)	Drake, 21 Savage	Her Loss
"Same Problems?"	2023	Songwriter, additional vocals	ASAP Rocky	TBA
"Search & Rescue"	2023	Co-producer (with 40)	Drake	Non-album single
1. "Thinking About Drilling"	2023	Songwriter, additional vocals	Baka Not Nice	Thinking About Drilling – EP
3. "Calling for You"; (featuring 21 Savage)	2023	Producer (with 40, Cash Cobain, Gent!, PoWRTrav, and Jay Stolaa)	Drake	For All the Dogs
15. "What Would Pluto Do"	2023	Producer (with Gent!, Bangs, and Bnyx)	Drake	For All the Dogs
21. "Another Late Night"; (featuring Lil Yachty)	2023	Producer (with Childboy)	Drake	For All the Dogs
22. "Away from Home"	2023	Producer (with Bnyx, Raisen, SadPony, and Lukas Levine)	Drake	For All the Dogs
23. "Polar Opposites"	2023	Producer (with Gent!, Anthoine Walters, Bangs, Beatmenace, and 40)	Drake	For All the Dogs
11. "I Need a Thug"	2023	Songwriter	City Girls	R.A.W.
18. "Fuck the D to the A"	2023	Songwriter	City Girls	R.A.W.
1. "Red Button"	2023	Co-producer (with Ovrkast)	Drake	For All the Dogs Scary Hours Edition
3. "The Shoe Fits"	2023	Co-producer (with Ovrkast)	Drake	For All the Dogs Scary Hours Edition
20. "Blue Sky"	2024	Producer (with Kid Cudi, Jean Baptiste, Justin Raisen, and SADPONY)	Kid Cudi	Insano
18. "Superboy"	2024	Producer (with Kid Cudi, Bnyx, Justin Raisen, JB, and SADPONY)	Kid Cudi	Insano (Nitro Mega)
9. "Untouchable"	2025	Producer (with Earl on the Beat and Bangs)	Lil Durk	Deep Thoughts

== Music videos ==
List of music videos, showing year released and director name
Year	Title	Director
2016	"1 Night"	Glassface and Rahil Ashruff
2016	"Wanna Be Us"	JMP and John Rawl
2016	"Minnesota"	RJ Sanchez and Brendan Vaughan
2017	"Shoot Out the Roof"	Sing Howe Yam
2017	"Peek a Boo"	Millicient Hailes
2017	"Bring It Back"	Millicient Hailes
2017	"Dirty Mouth"	Daps
2017	"Forever Young"	Alex Lill
2018	"Count Me In"	Logan Triplett
2018	"Boom!"	Glassface
