= Peekaboo (disambiguation) =

Peekaboo is a form of play primarily played with an infant.

Peekaboo may also refer to:

== Film and television ==
- Peekaboo (film), a 2011 Australian short film
- "Peekaboo" (Breaking Bad), a television episode
- "Peek-a-Boo" (Lego Ninjago: Masters of Spinjitzu), a television episode

== Music ==
- Peekaboo (musician), American dubstep producer
- Peek-A-Boo Records, an American record company
- Peekaboo (Marsheaux album), 2006
- Peekaboo (Aarne album), 2024
- "Peek-a-Boo!", a 1982 song by Devo
- Peek a Boo (Lil Yachty song), 2017
- Peek-a-Boo (Red Velvet song), 2017
- Peek-a-Boo (Siouxsie and the Banshees song), 1988
- "Peekaboo" (song), a 2025 song by Kendrick Lamar and AzChike
- "Peek-A-Boo", a 1958 song by the Cadillacs
- "Peek-A-Boo", a 1967 song by the New Vaudeville Band
- "Peek-A-Boo", a 1972 song by the Stylistics

== Other uses ==
- Peekaboo Galaxy, a dwarf galaxy in the constellation Hydra
- Peek-a-boo (boxing style), a boxing style
- Peek-a-Boo, a DC Comics supervillain and enemy of the Flash
- Peekaboo, a cat in the comic strip Rose Is Rose
- A nickname used by Donald Trump to refer to New York Attorney General Letitia James

== See also ==
- Picabo (disambiguation)
- Picaboo, a self-publishing and printing service in Hanover, New Hampshire, U.S.
- Picabu, restaurant at the Walt Disney World Dolphin resort
- Peekaboom, a human-based computation game introduced by Luis von Ahn
- See-through clothing, sometimes referred to as "peek-a-boo"
