= Glassface =

American music video director and producer

- Born: Josh Goldenberg
- Known for: Music video directing, VFX editing

Glassface, also known as Josh Goldenberg, is an American multi-disciplinary artist.

He is known primarily for his directorial and editing work in music videos and commercials, as well as for his music production and songwriting. Notable visual credits include the music videos for "U Guessed It" by OG Maco, and "One Night" by Lil Yachty. Notable music credits include production for artists like tobi lou, Young Thug, Chief Keef, and Parris Goebel.

== Early life ==
Goldenberg was born in a small town in upstate New York.

He studied electronic media, arts, and communication in college. Shortly after graduating, Goldenberg moved to New York City and worked in graphic design and branding for advertising agencies, which he found “dry”.

== Career ==
Seeking a creative outlet alongside his work in advertising, Goldenberg did video work and promotional materials for hip-hop artists including Flatbush Zombies and Schoolboy Q. Goldenberg began directing music videos under the name ‘Glassface’.

=== Music videos ===
In 2013, Goldenberg formed the directorial team GoldRush, composed of him and producer Rahil Ashruff. Alongside Ashruff, he shot music videos for various up-and-coming hip-hop musicians including Ab-Soul, Rome Fortune, and OG Maco.

In 2014, Glassface gained notoriety with the release of the music video for OG Maco’s debut single "U Guessed It". The video went viral, attaining over 73M views on YouTube and going as far as to be included on Rolling Stone’s list of the top 10 best music videos of that year.

The success of "U Guessed It" gained the attention of Lil Yachty, who reached out to Glassface via Twitter. This resulted in a collaboration between Lil Yachty and GoldRush on the video for "One Night", the lead single off of Yachty’s debut mixtape Lil Boat (2016).

The music video for "1 Night" was shot with the intent of creating an effect of “sensory overload”, full of “very meme-able and GIF-able material.” GoldRush was given near complete creative freedom on the project. The resulting video was another viral hit, having received over 131 million views on Lil Yachty’s YouTube channel as of 2023. Following "One Night", Glassface is credited on the videos for Lil Yachty's songs "66 (ft. Trippie Redd)", "Boom (ft. Ugly God)", and "Forever Young".

Glassface received a platinum plaque from the RIAA for his work on "One Night".

In 2019, he directed and edited the music video for "Jacques" by Tove Lo and Jax Jones.

=== Music branding and artwork ===
Glassface worked extensively with Ms. Lauryn Hill on branding and merch for her 2015 Small Axe Tour, as well as her 2016 Diaspora Calling Tour. He created the artwork Ms. Lauryn Hill’s 2016 release “Rebel / I Find It Hard To Say (Version)”.

Glassface worked with Kid Cudi to create the cover art for the debut single “Porsche Topless” off of Kid Cudi’s upcoming record Insano, his 9th studio album. In 2023, Kid Cudi revealed cover artwork Insano, with covers by Glassface and KAWS.

Glassface also collaborated with Kid Cudi on several designs for the first two seasons of the artist’s Members of the Rage clothing line collection in 2023.

== Commercial work ==
Glassface has directed TV spots for brands like Nike and Adidas.

He has also created commercial digital art. In 2021, he partnered with Google to create Ultradreamer, a web series focused on mental health and creativity that was shot entirely on Google Pixel phones. That same year, he created an AR experience in partnership with Snap, After Pay, and JD Sports called "Enter New Worlds". It debuted in Times Square alongside a digital art piece by Glassface. The digital art piece was sold by JD Sports as a limited edition collectible.

In 2022, he created a mixed-media NFT to promote Snapple’s element flavors.

Glassface continues to do commercial work. As of 2023, Glassface is a free agent working with the commercial production company RYB.

== Music ==
Glassface is a producer and singer/songwriter and has produced songs for artists including tobi lou, DRAM, Chief Keef, and Young Thug. His music has been used in the soundtracks of OVO’s Top Boy and Apple TV’s Loot (TV Series).

Glassface works frequently with Hip-Hop musician tobi lou. He has produced several songs with the artist, including “I Was Sad Last Night I’m Ok Now” and seven songs on tobi lou's debut album. Since 2007, Glassface has directed over twenty music videos for tobi lou.

== Discography ==
=== Songwriting and producing credits ===
Title	Year	Lead Artist	Writer	Producer
"New Bish"	2015	tobi lou	Yes	Yes
"Game Ova"	2016	tobi lou	No	Yes
"Hopefully"	2016	tobi lou	No	Yes
"Solange"	2017	tobi lou Ft. Glassface	Yes	Yes
"Lounar"	2018	tobi lou	Yes	Yes
"The Fun"	2018	tobi lou	Yes	Yes
"100 Thoughts"	2019	SL	No	Yes
"Cheap Vacations"	2019	tobi lou ft. Glassface	Yes	No
"Delete My # Baby"	2019	tobi lou	Yes	Yes
"Deserve It"	2019	tobi lou	Yes	Yes
"I Was Sad Last Night I’m OK Now"	2019	tobi lou	Yes	Yes
"Looped Up"	2019	tobi lou	Yes	Yes
"Spiral"	2019		Yes	Yes
"Theme Music"	2019	tobi lou	Yes	Yes
"Uncle Iroh"	2019	tobi lou	Yes	Yes
"Whole Lotta Love"	2019	tobi lou	Yes	No
"hot tub DREAM Machine"	2020	tobi lou	Yes	Yes
"hot tub TIME Machine"	2020	tobi lou	Yes	Yes
"Neither Here Nor There"	2020	tobi lou	Yes	Yes
"Meaningless"	2022	tobi lou	No	Yes
"Anybody"	2023	tobi lou	No	Yes
"Mansion"	2023	tobi lou	No	Yes
"Anybody/My Favorite Numbers - Mini Version"	2023	tobi lou	Yes	No
"Break"	2023	tobi lou ft. Glassface	Yes	Yes
"Cobra"	2023	tobi lou	Yes	Yes
"Fee"	2023	tobi lou	Yes	Yes
"Forecast"	2023	tobi lou	Yes	Yes
"Forecast - Mini Version"	2023	tobi lou	Yes	No
"Hold Me Close"	2023	tobi lou	Yes	Yes
"Mansion - Mini Version"	2023	tobi lou	Yes	No
"Meteor Shower"	2023	tobi lou	Yes	Yes
"Sorry I’m Late"	2023	tobi lou	Yes	Yes
"Whatever"	2023	Glassface	Yes	Yes

=== Music Video Filmography ===
Title	Year	Lead Artist	Director	Editor	VFX
"U Guessed It"	2014	OG Maco	Yes	Yes	Yes
"One Night"	2015	Lil Yachty	Yes	Yes	Yes
"Game Ova"	2016	tobi lou	Yes	Yes	No
"War"	2016	Tunji Ige	Yes	No	No
"Why Don’t You?"	2016	Tunji Ige	Yes	No	No
"Act Up"	2017	Thouxanbanfauni	No	No	Yes
"Mama Don’t Worry (Still Ain’t Dirty)"	2017	Bhad Bhabie	Video Producer Dir. Music VideoTrailer	No	No
"66"	2018	Lil Yachty	No	Yes	Yes
"BOOM!"	2018	Lil Yachty	Yes	Yes	Yes
"Khlorine (feat. Smino)"	2018	Sango	Yes	Yes	Yes
"Troop"	2018	tobi lou	Yes	Yes	Yes
"All My Friends"	2019	Madeon	No	Yes	Yes
"Alright"	2019	Wiz Khalifa	No	No	Yes
"CITY OF ANGELS"	2019	24kGoldn	No	No	Yes
"GOODMORNINGTOKYO!"	2019	Cliiifford	No	No	Yes
"Jacques"	2019	Tove Lo, Jax Jones	Yes	Yes	Yes
"Perfect"	2019	Cousin Stizz	Yes	Yes	Yes
"2hrs"	2020	tobi lou	Yes	No	No
"Get On With Your Life"	2020	beaux	No	Yes	No
"Ice Cold Chilli"	2020	Cantrell	Yes	Yes	No
"Inhale"	2020	Bryson Tiller	No	No	Yes
"LINGO STARR"	2020	tobi lou	Yes	Yes	Yes
"Notice Me"	2020	tobi lou	Yes	No	No
"OKAY"	2020	tobi lou	Yes	No	No
"Pretty Much"	2020	tobi lou	Yes	No	Yes
"Skin Care Tutorial 2020"	2020	tobi lou	No	Additional Editing	No
"Student Loans"	2020	tobi lou	Yes	No	No
"Summer 2020"	2020	Jhene Aiko	Additional Direction	Yes	Yes
"hot tub DREAM Machine"	2020	tobi lou	Yes	Yes	Yes
"Babycakes"	2022	tobi lou	EP & Tech Director	No	No
"Hopeless Romantic"	2022	tobi lou	EP & Tech Director	No	No
"Slime-U-Out"	2022	Shy Glizzy	No	No	3D Artist
"Meteor Shower (Acoustic Version)"	2023	tobi lou	Yes	Yes	No
