= Esther Anaya =

Esther Anaya aka ANAYA
- Born: July 31, 1995 (age 31)
- Genres: Pop; EDM; Latin; R&B
- Occupations: Singer-songwriter; DJ; violinist; producer
- Website: anayaofficial.com

Esther Anaya is a singer, DJ, violinist, and music producer who is currently the Official DJ for the Los Angeles Chargers of the National Football League (NFL). She performed violin on Lil Yachty's debut album Teenage Emotions, and collaborated with Snoop Dogg on her 2022 release "BAYC."

== Background and career ==
Anaya was born in Colombia and took violin lessons from a young age. She received her undergraduate degree in Business Management, Human Resources in from California State University, Dominguez Hills in 2014. In 2018, Anaya was selected to open for Maluma as part of a 21-city European tour. For the 2022-2023 NFL season, Anaya appeared as the Official DJ for the Los Angeles Chargers. She also held a residency at Resorts World Las Vegas where she has been featured alongside Tiesto, Zedd, DJ Snake, and other notable EDM artists. Throughout her career, she has shared the stage with Rihanna, Snoop Dogg, Kanye West, Christian Castro, Ana Gabriel, Lunay, 50 Cent, Flo Rida, David Guetta, and Calvin Harris.

Anaya has also composed original music for Cadillac, and the DreamWorks original film Abominable.

== Philanthropy ==
In 2019, Anaya founded the NGO ASAF Angels, whose mission is to provide musical instruments and education to underserved communities in Latin-American countries.

== Discography ==
Discography
Title	Year Released
"Viola"	2018
"Macarambe"	2019
"Tu y Yo"	2021
"BAYC"	2022
"009"	2022
"Tu y Yo Guaracha"	2022
"Adagio For Strings"	2022
"La Propuesta"	2022
"Before I Go"	2023
"Fiesta"	2023
"Sweet Dreams"	2023
