= Justine Skye =

American singer (born 1995)

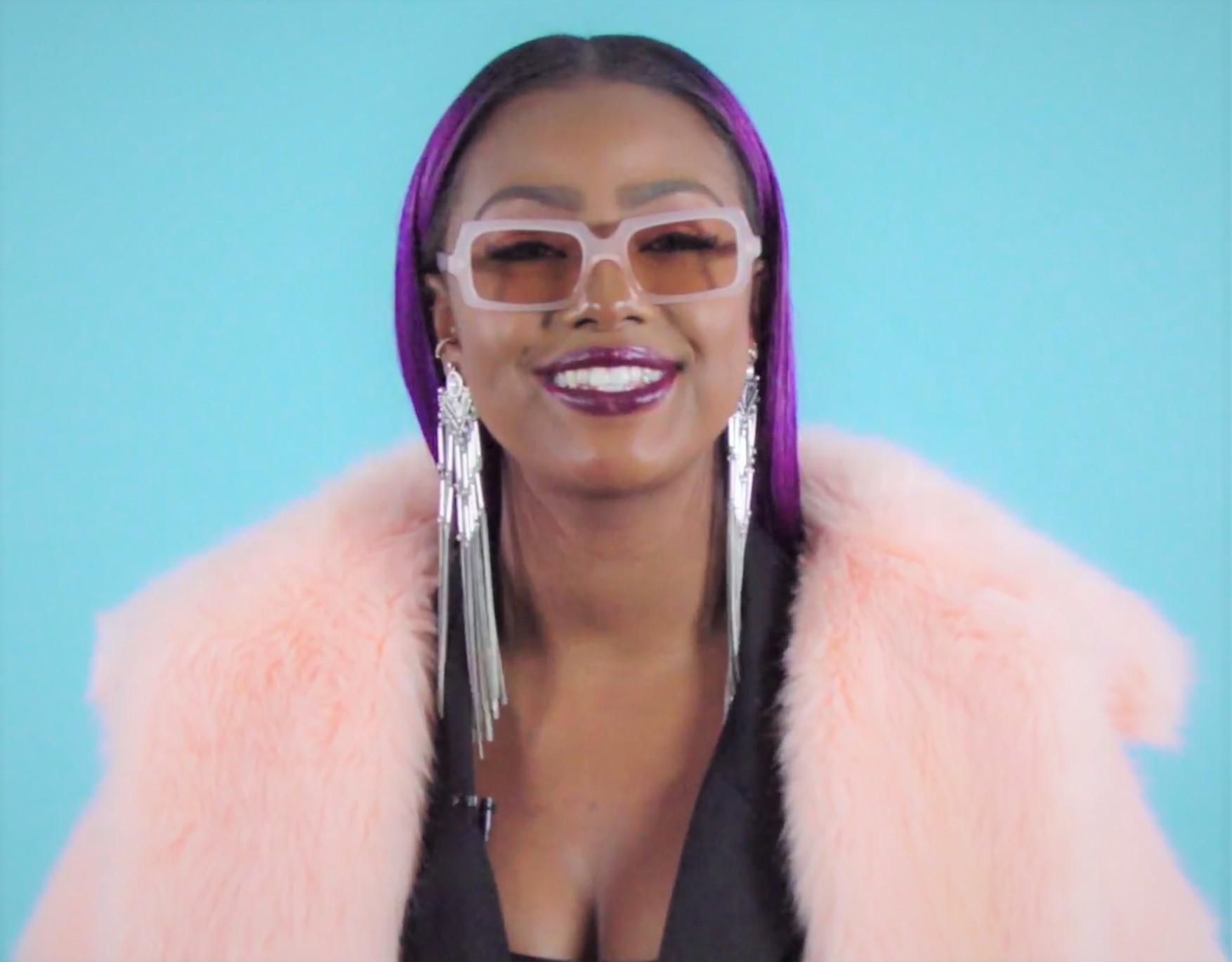
- Skye in 2018

Background information
- Born: Justine Indira Skyers; August 24, 1995 (age 31); New York City, U.S.
- Genres: R&B; dance
- Occupations: Singer; songwriter; actress
- Labels: Warner; Atlantic (former); Republic (former); Roc Nation (former)
- Website: justineskye.com

Justine Indira Skyers (born August 24, 1995), known professionally as Justine Skye, is an American singer-songwriter and actress. Her initial fame from Tumblr found a career in the music industry and signed with Atlantic Records at the age of 19.

== Early life ==
Justine Indira Skyers was born on August 24, 1995, and raised in the borough of Brooklyn, New York City. Her mother, Nova Perry, an entertainment lawyer, is of Afro-Jamaican and Indo-Jamaican descent, and her father, Christopher Skyers, a corporate merchandiser VP, is also Afro-Jamaican. Her grandfather is politician N. Nick Perry, the former United States ambassador to Jamaica.

== Career ==
Skye began her professional singing career when she performed songs to go with the book Rules to Rock By. She is known for having made a cover of Drake's song "Headlines", receiving over two million views on YouTube. In 2012, Skye released her very first mixtape, Skye High. Following the success of Skye High, her debut seven-track EP, Everyday Living, helped her land a deal with Atlantic Records in 2013. Her song "Hard Work" landed on BET's 106 & Park Top 10. She released the album Emotionally Unavailable in 2015. Not long after, her song "Collide" (featuring Tyga) was released.

In October 2015, she performed at Tidal 10x20, an event created by Jay-Z, and at a Tommy Hilfiger show in Brazil. Skye has not been limited to music and made an appearance as a guest star on the final episode of House of DVF.

In 2016, she left Atlantic Records and signed to Roc Nation and Republic Records. In December 2016, Skye released her EP 8 Ounces, to positive reviews.

Her debut album Ultraviolet was released on January 18, 2018. The album featured the singles "U Don't Know" (featuring Wizkid), "Back for More" (featuring Jeremih), and "Don't Think About It". The music video for "Don't Think About It" was released on December 8, the same day as the pre-order, and the song "Good Love" became available with the album pre-order. The album peaked at number 16 on the R&B Album Sales chart.

In June 2021, her third studio album, Space & Time, was released. The album was executively produced by Timbaland.

== Personal life ==
On November 19, 2018, Skye did an interview with The Breakfast Club, in which she spoke about experiencing domestic violence. On February 12, 2019, Skye identified rapper Sheck Wes as the abuser on Twitter, and shared a video of him climbing a fence at her house. He denies the allegations.

In 2019, Skye dated rapper GoldLink. In 2020, Skye dated singer-songwriter Giveon. They broke up in 2021.

== Discography ==
=== Studio albums ===
List of studio albums, with selected details and chart positions
| Title | Album details | Peak chart positions | |
| Title | Album details | US R&B/ HH Sales | US R&B Sales |
|---|---|---|---|
| Ultraviolet | Released: January 19, 2018; Label: Republic, Roc Nation; Formats: CD, digital download, streaming | 39 | 18 |
| Space & Time | Released: June 25, 2021; Label: Nynetineth; Formats: Digital download, streaming | — | — |

=== Compilation albums ===
List of compilation albums
| Title | Detail |
|---|---|
| Bare with Me (The Album) | Released: June 17, 2020; Label: Nynetineth; Formats: Digital download, streaming |
| Dark Side | Released: January 31, 2023; Label: Nynetineth; Formats: Digital download, streaming |

=== Extended plays ===
List of EPs, with selected chart positions
| Title | Details | Peak chart positions | | |
| Title | Details | US R&B/HH | US R&B | US Heat |
|---|---|---|---|---|
| Everyday Living | Released: August 20, 2013; Label: Atlantic; Format: Digital download, CD | 44 | 23 | 22 |
| Emotionally Unavailable | Released: June 23, 2015; Label: Atlantic; Format: Digital download | 37 | 14 | 13 |
| 8 Ounces | Released: December 23, 2016; Label: Republic; Format: Digital download | — | — | 8 |
| Bare with Me | Released: August 27, 2019; Label: Nynetineth; Format: Digital download, streaming | — (Note: Bare with Me did not enter the Top R&B/Hip-Hop Albums chart, but peaked at number 47 on the R&B/Hip-Hop Album Sales chart.) | — | — |
| Candy | Released: March 27, 2026; Label: Wait&See, Warner Records; Format: Digital download, streaming | — | — | — |

=== Singles ===
List of singles as lead artist, showing year released and album name
| Title | Year | Certifications | Album |
|---|---|---|---|
| "Everyday Living" | 2013 | | Everyday Living |
| "Hard Work" | 2013 | | |
| "Collide" (featuring Tyga) | 2014 | RIAA: Gold; BPI: Gold | Dark Side |
| "Bandit" | 2015 | | Emotionally Unavailable |
| "A Train" | 2015 | | Emotionally Unavailable |
| "U Don't Know" (featuring Wizkid) | 2016 | | Ultraviolet |
| "Back for More" (featuring Jeremih) | 2017 | | Ultraviolet |
| "Don't Think About It" | 2017 | | Ultraviolet |
| "Know Myself" (featuring Vory) | 2018 | | Non-album singles |
| "Build" (featuring Arin Ray) | 2018 | | Non-album singles |
| "Maybe" | 2019 | | Bare with Me |
| "No Options" | 2020 | | Bare with Me (The Album) |
| "Intruded" | 2021 | | Space & Time |
| "Twisted Fantasy" (featuring Rema) | 2021 | | Space & Time |
| "What a Lie" | 2022 | | Non-album singles |
| "Whip It Up" | 2023 | | Non-album singles |
| "Oh Lala" (with KAYTRANADA) | 2025 | | Candy |
| "Bitch in Ibiza" | 2025 | | Candy |
| "Yap" | 2025 | | Candy |
| "Thong" | 2026 | | Candy |

=== As a featured artist ===
List of songs as featured artist, with selected chart positions, showing year released and album name
| Title | Year | Peak chart positions | Album |
| Title | Year | US R&B/HH | Album |
|---|---|---|---|
| "Beautiful Day" (TheGoodPerry featuring Lil Yachty, Kylie Jenner, Justine Skye and Jordyn Woods) | 2016 | — | Burberry Perry |
| "Overtime" (Schoolboy Q featuring Miguel and Justine Skye) | 2016 | 50 | Blank Face LP |
| "Bad Habit" (Far East Movement featuring Justine Skye and Air) | 2019 | — | TBA |
"—" denotes a title that did not chart, or was not released in that territory.

== Filmography ==
=== Film ===
| Year | Title | Role | Notes |
|---|---|---|---|
| 2019 | How High 2 | Steffi | |
| 2019 | Already Gone | Keesha | |

=== Television ===
| Year | Title | Role | Notes |
|---|---|---|---|
| 2019 | Tales | Violet | Episode: "Bodak Yellow" |
| 2022–2023 | The Tonight Show Starring Jimmy Fallon | Herself | Musical guest |
| 2022–2023 | Grown-ish | Annika | Recurring role (season 5) |
| 2023 | Superstar: Aaliyah | Herself | ABC television documentary |
