= A Cold Sunday =

2024 single by Lil Yachty

Single by Lil Yachty

from the EP Something Ether
- Released: February 2, 2024
- Genre: Hip hop
- Length: 1:47
- Label: Quality Control; Motown
- Songwriters: Miles McCollum; Aris Tatalovich; Nate Jones
- Producer: Tatalovich

Lil Yachty singles chronology
"When We Die (Can We Still Get High?)" (2024)	"A Cold Sunday" (2024)	"Something Ether" (2024)

Music video
- "A Cold Sunday" on YouTube

"A Cold Sunday" is a song by American rapper Lil Yachty, released on February 2, 2024, as the lead single from his EP Something Ether (2024). Produced by Aris Tatalovich, it contains a sample of "Inspiration of My Life" by the band Citation.

== Background ==
On December 13, 2023, Lil Yachty teased the song on TikTok as the third installment of his "Verses I'm Proud of" series.

== Composition ==
"A Cold Sunday" contains a boom bap instrumental and jazz riff accompanied with looping chopped-up guitar and vocal samples, over which Lil Yachty ruminates on heartbreak and his life (according to his press release, "living the life of a rolling stone"). At one point, he makes a reference to City Girls and their song "Act Up". He also raps about the value of his material wealth, including recklessly spending large amounts of money on cars and women, which he hints takes place on Collins Avenue. At the end of the song, he shows pride in his lifestyle and states he does not care if people do not like him.

== Critical reception ==
The song was well-received by music critics. Ken Partridge of Genius commented the song highlights Lil Yachty's "playfulness and lyrical dexterity" and considered it a time when "he'll remind you that he's a better rapper than many people give him credit for." Zachary Horvath of HotNewHipHop stated, "What is impressive about this 1:47-long track, is the lyrical prowess Yachty is displaying. It has similar vibes to his and J. Cole's 'The Secret Recipe.'" Alex Gonzalez of Uproxx wrote of the song, "Yachty reminds of his rap chops, reiterating how much he's evolved as an artist."

== Music video ==
The music video was directed by AMD Visuals and released alongside the single. It sees Lil Yachty performing the song through five frames simultaneously, each from different angles, in front of a white background. He wears a white long-sleeve shirt, ripped jean shorts, blue bandana and furry boots.

== Charts ==
Chart performance for "A Cold Sunday"
Chart (2024)	Peak position
New Zealand Hot Singles (RMNZ)	40
US Billboard Hot 100	87
US Hot R&B/Hip-Hop Songs (Billboard)	31
