= Picabo (disambiguation) =

Picabo Street (born 1971) is an American World Cup alpine ski racer and Olympic gold medalist.

Picabo may also refer to:

- Picabo, Idaho, U.S.
- Picabo volcanic field, in Yellowstone volcanic hotspot, western U.S.
- Picabo, a character on the Canadian children's television show Les Oraliens

== See also ==
- Peekaboo (disambiguation)
- Picaboo, a self-publishing and printing service based in Hanover, New Hampshire, U.S.
- Picabu, restaurant at the Walt Disney World Dolphin resort
