= 66 (Lil Yachty song) =

Song by Lil Yachty featuring Trippie Redd

from the album Lil Boat 2
- Released: March 9, 2018
- Genre: Hip-hop; cloud rap
- Length: 2:35
- Label: Capitol; Motown; Quality Control
- Songwriters: Miles McCollum; Michael White IV; Dwan Avery
- Producer: DY

"66" is a song by American rapper Lil Yachty featuring fellow American rapper Trippie Redd. It was released as the last track on Lil Yachty's second studio album Lil Boat 2. The song peaked at number 73 on the Billboard Hot 100.

== Background ==
The track is the first collaboration between Lil Yachty and Trippie Redd.

== Music video ==
The music video for the track was released on August 16, 2018, and was directed by Drew Kirsch, Mihailo Andic, and Lil Yachty himself. Trace William Cowen of Complex called the video "ominous".

== Critical reception ==
The track received generally positive reviews. Joshua Minsoo Kim of Spin called the track a highlight off of Lil Boat 2, stating it was mostly great "because of Trippie Redd’s melodic sensibility". Sam Moore of NME called the track "a welcome source of relief from the overbearing raps" on the album, saying that the beat was "the kind of cloud-rap instrumental Yung Lean circa-2013 would’ve felt comfortable throwing his bucket hat on".

== Commercial performance ==
In less than a week, the song had reached over five million streams on Spotify, twice the amount of streams the track "Baby Daddy" featuring Lil Pump and Offset had. The song debuted and peaked at number 73 on the Billboard Hot 100, and at number 36 on the Hot R&B/Hip-Hop Songs chart.

== Charts ==
Chart (2018)	Peak position
Canada (Canadian Hot 100)	74
New Zealand Heatseeker Singles (RMNZ)	3
US Billboard Hot 100	73
US Hot R&B/Hip-Hop Songs (Billboard)	36

== Certifications ==
Region	Certification	Certified units/sales
United States (RIAA)	Platinum	1,000,000^{‡}
^{‡} Sales+streaming figures based on certification alone.
