= Lil Boat 2 =

Studio album by Lil Yachty
- Released: March 9, 2018
- Recorded: 2017–2018
- Genres: Hip-hop; trap; mumble rap
- Length: 44:53
- Labels: Capitol; Motown; Quality Control
- Producers: 30 Roc; Buddah Bless; Charlie Shuffler; Digital Nas; DJ Durel; DY; Earl the Pearl; Pi'erre Bourne; Polo Boy Shawty; Southside; TM88

Lil Yachty chronology
| Teenage Emotions (2017) | Lil Boat 2 (2018) | Nuthin' 2 Prove (2018) |

Lil Boat 2 is the second studio album by American rapper Lil Yachty. It was released on March 9, 2018, by Capitol Records, Motown and Quality Control Music. The album features guest appearances from Quality Control labelmates Quavo and Offset of Migos and Lil Baby, alongside 2 Chainz, Trippie Redd, Lil Pump, YoungBoy Never Broke Again and Tee Grizzley, among others.

Despite receiving mixed reviews from critics, Lil Boat 2 performed well commercially, debuting at number two on the US Billboard 200, with 64,000 album-equivalent units.

== Background ==
Originally set to release in December 2017, the project was delayed, however Yachty recently revealed the project was finished via Instagram Live. On February 19, 2018, Lil Yachty revealed the cover art and release date on his social media accounts. The tracklist was revealed on March 5, 2018.

== Artwork ==
The album's artwork features Lil Yachty in orange-hued water, shirtless and sporting a couple of big diamond and gold chains.

== Critical reception ==
Professional ratings
Aggregate scores
| Source | Rating |
|---|---|
| AnyDecentMusic? | 4.6/10 |
| Metacritic | 50/100 |
Review scores
| Source | Rating |
| AllMusic | 2/5 stars |
| Exclaim! | 4/10 |
| The Guardian | 2/5 stars |
| HipHopDX | 3.1/5 |
| HotNewHipHop | 71% |
| NME | 3/5 stars |
| Pitchfork | 5.8/10 |
| RapReviews | 6/10 |
| Rolling Stone | 2.5/5 stars |
| Spectrum Culture | 2.5/5 stars |

Lil Boat 2 was met with mixed reviews. At Metacritic, which assigns a normalized rating out of 100 to reviews from professional publications, the album received an average score of 50, based on eight reviews. Aggregator AnyDecentMusic? gave it 4.6 out of 10, based on their assessment of the critical consensus.

In a mixed review, NME's Sam Moore stated: "Clocking in at 47 minutes (despite its 17-track length), Lil Boat 2 feels like a vast improvement from Teenage Emotions simply as it doesn't feel like an ordeal to listen to. What that does do, however, is narrow down your focus, which tends to land on Yachty's predisposition for telling us just how rich he is now." Comparing Lil Boat 2 to its predecessor, Sheldon Pearce of Pitchfork labelled the album "a sequel in name only, a far cry from the candy-coated, bittersweet melodies that made him a viral sensation on the original", as well as criticizing Yachty's songwriting and sonic approach. Andy Kellman of AllMusic said, "There's an abundance of low-wattage boasts about financial and libidinal surpluses, most of which could have been composed by a generator. Softer and more melodic cuts are indicated with all-lowercase track titles. ... If Yachty can find a way to be his goofy self and elevate his writing, he can rebound".

Alexis Petridis of The Guardian concluded that "In trading his sunlit humour for tedious boasts, the rap star has only succeeded in giving more ammunition to his many critics", adding that "Lil Boat 2's main musical currency is a kind of frugal gloom, in which icy electronic drones waft over sparse beats". M. T. Richards of Exclaim! said, "While sometimes amateurish, Yachty's older music was at least true to his lived experiences. Today, he's just another dreadlocked cipher mouthing predigested banalities". Scott Glaysher of HipHopDX gave a favorable review, stating "Lil Boat 2 is a simply a weird musical vacation that sets sail into the strange mind of the impactful red-haired youngster".

== Commercial performance ==
Lil Boat 2 debuted at number two on the US Billboard 200 dated March 24, 2018, with 64,000 album-equivalent units (including 7,000 pure album sales). It is Lil Yachty's second top five album after Teenage Emotions (2017), and his highest-peaking.

== Track listing ==
Lil Boat 2 track listing
| No. | Title | Writer(s) | Producer(s) | Length |
|---|---|---|---|---|
| 1. | "Self Made" | Miles McCollum; Charlie Shuffler | Shuffler | 1:52 |
| 2. | "Boom!" (featuring Ugly God) | McCollum; Royce Rodriguez; Samuel Gloade | 30 Roc | 3:49 |
| 3. | "Oops" (featuring 2 Chainz and K Supreme) | McCollum; Tauheed Epps; Khalil Dalton; Damon Hendricks | Polo Boy Shawty | 2:35 |
| 4. | "Talk to Me Nice" (featuring Quavo) | McCollum; Quavious Marshall; Daryl McPherson | DJ Durel | 2:53 |
| 5. | "Get Money Bros." (featuring Tee Grizzley) | McCollum; Gloade; Terry Wallace | 30 Roc | 2:40 |
| 6. | "Count Me In" | McCollum; Jordan Jenks | Pi'erre Bourne | 2:17 |
| 7. | "She Ready" (featuring PnB Rock) | McCollum; Rakim Allen; Isaac Bynum; Gloade | Earl the Pearl; 30 Roc | 3:05 |
| 8. | "Love Me Forever" | McCollum; Tyron Douglas; Jabari York | Buddah Bless; Jabz^{[a]} | 1:44 |
| 9. | "Das Cap" | McCollum; Joshua Luellen | Southside; TM88 | 3:04 |
| 10. | "Pop Out" (featuring JBands2Turnt) | McCollum; Joshua Heath; Nasir Pemberton | Digital Nas | 2:53 |
| 11. | "NBAYoungBoat" (featuring YoungBoy Never Broke Again) | McCollum; Kentrell Gaulden; Pemberton | Digital Nas | 2:19 |
| 12. | "Mickey" (featuring Offset and Lil Baby) | McCollum; Kiari Cephus; Dominique Jones; Gloade | 30 Roc | 2:40 |
| 13. | "FWM" | McCollum; Bynum | Earl the Pearl | 2:22 |
| 14. | "Flex" | McCollum; Gloade | 30 Roc | 2:10 |
| 15. | "Whole Lotta Guap" | McCollum; Jenks | Pi'erre Bourne | 2:52 |
| 16. | "Baby Daddy" (featuring Lil Pump and Offset) | McCollum; Gazzy Garcia; Cephus; Gloade | 30 Roc | 3:05 |
| 17. | "66" (featuring Trippie Redd) | McCollum; Michael White IV; Dwan Avery | DY; Steve Lean^{[b]} | 2:33 |
| Total length: | | | | 44:53 |

Notes

- ^{^[a]} signifies a co-producer
- ^{^[b]} signifies an uncredited co-producer
- Tracks 1–6, 9–14 and 16 are stylized in all uppercase letters. For example, "Talk to Me Nice" is stylized as "TALK TO ME NICE".
- Tracks 7 and 8 are stylized in all lowercase letters. For example, "She Ready" is stylized as "she ready".
- "Whole Lotta Guap" is stylized as "WHOLE lotta GUAP"

== Personnel ==
Credits were adapted from Tidal.

Technical

- Thomas "Tillie" Mann – recording (tracks 1–3, 5–10, 13–15), mixing (all tracks)
- Nolan Presley – recording (track 3)
- DJ Durel – recording (track 4)
- Lil Yachty – recording (track 11)
- Matty P – recording (tracks 12, 16)
- Stephen "DotCom" Farrow – mixing assistance (all tracks)
- Finish "KY" White – mixing assistance (track 3)
- Jordan "J Rich" Walker – recording (tracks 9, 10, 15)
- Colin Leonard – mastering (all tracks)

Miscellaneous

- Lil Yachty – art direction
- Mihailo Andic – art direction, photography

== Charts ==
=== Weekly charts ===
Chart performance for Lil Boat 2
| Chart (2018) | Peak position |
|---|---|
| Australian Albums (ARIA) | 36 |
| Belgian Albums (Ultratop Flanders) | 53 |
| Belgian Albums (Ultratop Wallonia) | 112 |
| Canadian Albums (Billboard) | 7 |
| Danish Albums (Hitlisten) | 30 |
| Dutch Albums (Album Top 100) | 25 |
| Irish Albums (IRMA) | 34 |
| Italian Albums (FIMI) | 66 |
| New Zealand Albums (RMNZ) | 23 |
| Norwegian Albums (VG-lista) | 17 |
| Swedish Albums (Sverigetopplistan) | 33 |
| Swiss Albums (Schweizer Hitparade) | 50 |
| UK Albums (Official Charts) | 44 |
| US Billboard 200 | 2 |
| US Top R&B/Hip-Hop Albums (Billboard) | 2 |

=== Year-end charts ===
2018 year-end chart performance for Lil Boat 2
| Chart (2018) | Position |
|---|---|
| US Billboard 200 | 136 |
| US Top R&B/Hip-Hop Albums (Billboard) | 67 |

== Certifications ==
Certifications for Lil Boat 2
| Region | Certification | Certified units/sales |
|---|---|---|
| United States (RIAA) | Gold | 500,000^{‡} |
^{‡} Sales+streaming figures based on certification alone.
