= Strike (Holster) =

2023 single by Lil Yachty

Single by Lil Yachty

from the EP Tesla
- Released: April 7, 2023
- Length: 2:28
- Label: Quality Control; Motown
- Songwriters: Miles McCollum; Teddy Walton; Aaron Booe
- Producers: Walton; Aaron Bow

Lil Yachty singles chronology
| "One of Those Days" (2023) | "Strike (Holster)" (2023) | "Slide" / "Solo Steppin Crete Boy" (2023) |

Music video
- "Strike (Holster)" on YouTube

"Strike (Holster)" is a song by American rapper Lil Yachty, released on April 7, 2023 by Quality Control Music and Motown. It was produced by Teddy Walton and Aaron Bow.

== Background ==
The song was first previewed in December 2022 on social media. It was released months after Yachty released his psychedelic rock-influenced album Let's Start Here (2023), and is considered a return to his signature melodic rap sound.

== Composition ==
"Strike (Holster)" uses a melodic rap approach, featuring "space-age" synths, a "laid-back" atmosphere, and a "sonic vibrato utilized throughout" the song, while also combining with psychedelic elements. The song also contains "boastful lyrics about money, drugs, and women".

== Music video ==
An official music video was directed by Cole Bennett. It sees Lil Yachty at a forest reserve, lakeside pier, and in a parking garage where a "massive bottle is seen strapped to a Maybach". He wears a different outfit for each of the locations; respectively, they are flannel and denim, bright red, and black clothing. His sister, Nina Simone, makes a cameo at the end of the clip.

== Charts ==
Chart performance for "Strike (Holster)"
| Chart (2023) | Peak position |
|---|---|
| Canada Hot 100 (Billboard) | 88 |
| New Zealand Hot Singles (RMNZ) | 19 |
| South Africa (TOSAC) | 6 |
| US Billboard Hot 100 | 71 |
| US Hot R&B/Hip-Hop Songs (Billboard) | 20 |
