= Mickey (Lil Yachty song) =

2018 song by Lil Yachty

Song by Lil Yachty featuring Offset and Lil Baby

from the album Lil Boat 2
- Released: March 9, 2018
- Length: 2:40
- Label: Capitol; Motown; Quality Control
- Songwriter(s): Miles McCollum; Kiari Cephus; Dominique Jones; Samuel Gloade
- Producer(s): 30 Roc

"Mickey" is a song by American rapper Lil Yachty featuring fellow American rappers Offset of Migos and Lil Baby. It was released as the 12th track off of Yachty's second studio album Lil Boat 2. The track peaked at number seven on the Bubbling Under Hot 100 chart and at number 79 on the Canadian Hot 100.

== Background ==
The song is one of two tracks featuring Offset on Lil Boat 2: the other one is "Baby Daddy", which also has a feature from Lil Pump.

== TikTok challenge ==
A TikTok challenge based on the song went viral. The challenge features a person sitting down and then being pulled away. It is based around the lyric on the song by Offset, "Trappin' out the back street / Runnin' through the packs like a track meet (Zoom)", with the "Zoom" adlib being supplied by Lil Yachty. The challenge was deemed dangerous after multiple videos surfaced of children doing the challenge and being violently pulled off-screen.

== Critical reception ==
The track received lukewarm reviews. Yoh Phillips of DJBooth said he "really enjoyed Lil Baby, but Offset and Yachty left me wanting more", also adding "if Yachty’s production was a person, they would probably be in custody for unlawful acts".

== Charts ==
Chart (2018)	Peak position
Canada (Canadian Hot 100)	79
US Bubbling Under Hot 100 Singles (Billboard)	7
US Bubbling Under R&B/Hip-Hop Singles (Billboard)	2

== Certifications ==
Region	Certification	Certified units/sales
United States (RIAA)	Gold	500,000^{‡}
^{‡} Sales+streaming figures based on certification alone.
