= Collide (Justine Skye song) =

Single by Justine Skye featuring Tyga

from the album Dark Side
- Released: August 25, 2014
- Recorded: 2013–2014
- Studio: Make Ah Sound
- Genre: Hip-hop; R&B
- Length: 4:20
- Label: Atlantic
- Songwriters: Justine Skyers; Michael Stevenson; Dijon McFarlane; Tiyon “TC” Mack
- Producer: DJ Mustard

Justine Skye singles chronology
"Hard Work" (2013)	"Collide" (2014)	"Bandit" (2015)

Tyga singles chronology
"Bubblegum" (2014)	"Collide" (2014)	"Ayo" (2015)

Music video
- "Collide" on YouTube

"Collide" is a single by American R&B singer Justine Skye, released on August 25, 2014. The track features a guest verse by American rapper Tyga and was produced by DJ Mustard.

In 2022, the song become a viral audio on TikTok which prompted a significant increase of streams on music platforms and additions to radio stations around the world. In 2023, the song was later included on Skye's second compilation album, Dark Side, along with a solo version and sped up remix.

== Music video ==
A music video for the single featuring Tyga, was released on Justine's YouTube channel, on October 8, 2014 and currently has over 76 million views. It was filmed in Palmdale, California.

== Chart performance ==
2014 chart performance for "Collide"
Chart (2014)	Peak position
US R&B/Hip-Hop Airplay (Billboard)	38

2022–2023 chart performance for "Collide"
Chart (2022–2023)	Peak position
Global 200 (Billboard)	126
Netherlands (Single Tip)	4
Sweden Heatseeker (Sverigetopplistan)	17
Vietnam (Vietnam Hot 100)	85
UK Audio Streaming Chart (OCC)	89
UK Hip Hop/R&B (OCC)	28

== Certifications ==
Region	Certification	Certified units/sales
New Zealand (RMNZ)	2× Platinum	60,000^{‡}
United Kingdom (BPI)	Gold	400,000^{‡}
United States (RIAA)	Gold	500,000^{‡}
^{‡} Sales+streaming figures based on certification alone.
