= Tesla (song) =

Single by Lil Yachty

from the EP Tesla
- Released: August 25, 2023
- Genre: Hip-hop
- Length: 2:44
- Label: Quality Control; Motown
- Songwriter: Miles Parks McCollum
- Producers: MitchGoneMad, WesGoneMad

Lil Yachty singles chronology
"One of Those Days" (2023)	"Tesla" (2023)	"The Secret Recipe" (2023)

Music video
- "Tesla" on YouTube

"Tesla" is a song by American rapper Lil Yachty, released on August 25, 2023, under Quality Control Music and Motown Records.

== Background and release ==
The song was produced by MitchGoneMad and WesGoneMad and was released following up an extended play with the same title Tesla. The song came out alongside the previously released "Slide", "Strike (Holster)" and "Solo Steppin Crete Boy". "Tesla" peaked at No. 180 on the Billboard Global 200 chart, No. 44 on the magazine's Hot R&B/Hip-Hop Songs chart, and No. 21 on the Bubbling Under Hot 100 chart.

== Music video ==
"Tesla" visuals was released officially alongside the song on August 25, 2023. It was shot and directed by Lyrical Lemonade and Cole Bennett.

== Track listing ==
"Tesla" single track listing
No.	Title	Writer(s)	Length
1.	"Tesla"	Miles Parks McCollum	2:44
2.	"Slide"	Miles Parks McCollum	2:29
3.	"Solo Steppin Crete Boy"	Miles Parks McCollum	2:29
4.	"Strike (Holster)"	Miles Parks McCollum	2:28

== Charts ==
Weekly chart performance for "Tesla"
Chart (2023)	Peak position
Global 200 (Billboard)	180
US Hot R&B/Hip-Hop Songs	44
US Bubbling Under Hot 100	21
