= Minnesota (song) =

Single by Lil Yachty featuring Quavo, Skippa da Flippa and Young Thug

from the album Lil Boat
- Released: August 22, 2015 (original); March 9, 2016 (remix)
- Recorded: 2015
- Genre: Hip hop; trap
- Length: 4:28
- Label: Quality Control; Capitol; Motown
- Songwriters: Miles McCollum; Quavious Marshall; Ramses Ful; Jeffery Williams; Kevin Purnell
- Producer: Grandfero

Lil Yachty singles chronology
"One Night" (2015)	"Minnesota" (2015)	"Broccoli" (2016)

Quavo singles chronology
"F Cancer" (2016)	"Minnesota" (2016)	"Pick Up the Phone" (2016)

Skippa da Flippa singles chronology
"Switch Up" (2016)	"Minnesota" (2016)	"Mr. Perfect" (2016)

Young Thug singles chronology
"Best Friend" (2015)	"Minnesota" (2016)	"Pick Up the Phone" (2016)

Music video
- "Minnesota" on YouTube

"Minnesota" is a song by American rapper Lil Yachty. It was originally released in August 22, 2015 from his Summer Songs EP, before being re-released on March 9, 2016, as a remix featuring American rappers Quavo, Skippa da Flippa and Young Thug as the second single from Yachty's debut mixtape, Lil Boat.

== Background and release ==
"Minnesota" was originally released in November 2015, and was on his debut EP titled Summer Songs EP. The original version of "Minnesota" was 2:05 long and only included vocals from Lil Yachty. The song was then remixed by rappers, Quavo, Skippa Da Flippa and Young Thug and was included on his debut mixtape Lil Boat.

== Music video ==
The music video for "Minnesota", directed by Brendan Vaughan and RJ Sanchez, premiered on November 18, 2016, via Yachty's Vevo channel. Young Thug's verse is omitted in the video.

== Remixes ==
On July 8, 2016, rapper and singer PnB Rock released his remix of the song titled "Alaska" via his SoundCloud. On December 31, 2016, rapper Allan Kingdom released his remix of the song via SoundCloud.

== Charts ==
Weekly chart performance for "Minnesota"
Chart (2016)	Peak position
US Bubbling Under Hot 100 (Billboard)	21
US Bubbling Under R&B/Hip-Hop Singles (Billboard)	3

== Certifications ==
Certifications for "Minnesota"
Region	Certification	Certified units/sales
United States (RIAA)	Platinum	1,000,000^{‡}
^{‡} Sales+streaming figures based on certification alone.
