= Burberry Perry (EP) =

EP by TheGoodPerry
- Released: May 4, 2016
- Genre: Trap
- Length: 22:47
- Label: Self-released
- Producer: TheGoodPerry (exec.)

TheGoodPerry chronology
Burberry Perry (2016)	Make It Home Safe (2017)

Singles from Burberry Perry
- 1. "1500" Released: May 4, 2016

Burberry Perry is the self-made debut extended play by American rapper TheGoodPerry. It was self-released on May 4, 2016. The EP consists of 6 tracks and was produced entirely by Perry himself, with guest appearances from artists such as Lil Yachty, Kylie Jenner, Justine Skye and Jordyn Woods.

== Critical reception ==
Tiny Mix Tapes included the EP in their 2016 Second Quarter Favorites list, calling it "thrilling, intoxicating, transcendent even" and likening it to "a crystalline broadcast from an alternate Earth, one where Steve Reich and Brian Eno were as seminal influences on rap music as James Brown and Sly Stone."

== Track listing ==
All tracks produced solely by TheGoodPerry.

No.	Title	Writer(s)	Length
1.	"Ride"	Perry Moise	3:42
2.	"Tech 9"	Moise	4:05
3.	"Interlude"	Moise	2:44
4.	"Happy"	Moise	3:11
5.	"Beautiful Day" (featuring Lil Yachty, Kylie Jenner, Justine Skye and Jordyn Woods)	Moise; Miles McCollum; Kylie Jenner; Justine Skye; Jordyn Woods	4:06
6.	"1500" (featuring Lil Yachty)	Moise; McCollum	4:59
Total length:			22:47
