= Teenage Emotions =

Studio album by Lil Yachty
- Released: May 26, 2017
- Studio: Ameraycan; Paramount; Wedidit (Los Angeles); Brand Media (Fairburn); Free World (West Hollywood); Mama's House (Georgia); Migos Mansion; Quality Sound (Atlanta); Mobile Studio Bus / Major Touring (United States); Royal House (Royal Oak)
- Genre: Hip-hop; trap; pop rap
- Length: 69:12
- Label: Capitol; Motown; Quality Control
- Producer: 30 Roc; BLSSD; D33J; Dashiell Tortoriello; Digital Nas; Diplo; Earl; Free School; TheGoodPerry; ILoveUPeter; K Swisha; Lex Luger; Mitus; Pi'erre Bourne; R!O; Reefer Alston; Ricky Racks; The Stereotypes; TrapMoneyBenny; WondaGurl

Lil Yachty chronology
Summer Songs 2 (2016)	Teenage Emotions (2017)	Lil Boat 2 (2018)

Singles from Teenage Emotions
- 1. "Harley" Released: April 14, 2017; 2. "Peek a Boo" Released: April 14, 2017; 3. "Bring It Back" Released: May 4, 2017; 4. "X Men" Released: May 18, 2017

Teenage Emotions is the debut studio album by American rapper Lil Yachty. It was released on May 26, 2017, by Capitol Records, Motown, and Quality Control Music. The album features guest appearances from Migos, YG, Kamaiyah, Stefflon Don, Diplo, Grace, and Sonyae Elise, among others.

Teenage Emotions was supported by the singles, "Harley", "Peek a Boo", "Bring It Back", and "X Men". The album received lukewarm reviews from critics and debuted at number five on the US Billboard 200.

== Promotion ==
The album's first single, "Harley", was released on April 14, 2017. The song was produced by K Swisha.

The album's lead single, "Peek a Boo", was released for digital download on April 14, 2017. It was later sent to rhythmic and urban contemporary radio on May 9, 2017. The song features a guest appearance from American hip-hop trio Migos, while the production was handled by Ricky Racks. The song peaked at number 78 on the US Billboard Hot 100.

The album's third single, "Bring It Back", was released on May 4, 2017. The song was produced by Free School. The album's fourth single, "X Men", was released on May 18, 2017. The song features a guest appearance from American rapper Evander Griiim, while the production was handled by 30 Roc, with co-production by Tillie.

=== Other songs ===
A music video for the song, "Dirty Mouth", was released on June 23, 2017. The music video for "Forever Young" featuring Diplo, was released on August 4, 2017. The music video for the song, "Better" featuring Stefflon Don, was released on September 15, 2017, while the music video for "Lady in Yellow", was released on September 28.

== Critical reception ==
Professional ratings
Aggregate scores
Source	Rating
AnyDecentMusic?	6.2/10
Metacritic	63/100
Review scores
Source	Rating
AllMusic	2.5/5 stars
The A.V. Club	C
Consequence	B−
Exclaim!	5/10
The Guardian	4/5 stars
The Irish Times	3/5 stars
The Observer	3/5 stars
Pitchfork	6.8/10
Rolling Stone	3.5/5 stars
XXL	3/5

Teenage Emotions was met with lukewarm reviews. At Metacritic, which assigns a normalized rating out of 100 to reviews from professional publications, the album received an average score of 63, based on 15 reviews, indicating "generally favorable reviews". Aggregator AnyDecentMusic? gave it 6.2 out of 10, based on their assessment of the critical consensus.

Ryan Meaney of Consequence stated that "Lil Yachty the pop star shines on Teenage Emotions, and the wide range of styles with which he delivers his message of youthful exuberance shows a growing artist. ... Filler tracks such as "Dirty Mouth" and "Moments in Time" derail the parade of energy Teenage Emotions delivers, leaving the record with too many skip-worthy moments". Ben Beaumont-Thomas of The Guardian saying "Like fellow pop-rappers Rae Sremmurd, Yachty will often use a single melody for the verse and chorus, thus creating a new, disturbing kind of catchiness, a hook that digs into your cortex with such purchase that at least one part of your subconscious is singing it at all times. His freewheeling scansion, meanwhile, stops it being monolithic or boring". Sheldon Pearce, an author for Pitchfork, said, "Though far too long and sometimes aimless, Teenage Emotions is the mind of a child star blown-up and on exhibition at the epicenter of modern rap. It's there to be gawked at and appreciated, and then maybe enjoyed". Christopher R. Weingarten of Rolling Stone said, "Yachty's organic, warts-and-all delivery—when being a perv, when pining for a girl, even singing a song for his mom—makes his music feel simply more naked and human, even with that layer of Auto-Tune". Daniel Bromfield of Pretty Much Amazing said, "The moments when his music really comes alive with joy are the best on Teenage Emotions, and they're often the less rap-oriented moments". Andy Kellman of AllMusic said, "The album's 70-minute length allows enough space for a bounty of mostly nondescript trap productions that support these simplistic boasts. In these tracks, Yachty sounds like he's going through a phase more than refining his individualism".

Calum Slingerland of Exclaim! said, "At over an hour in length, Teenage Emotions is more quantity than quality". Kitty Empire of The Observer said, "It's a graphic exemplar of the contemporary Atlanta sound: stark backing, nagging hook and staccato wordplay, as distinct from the lyricism that traditionalists hold dear". Matthew Ramirez of Spin said, "It's a confusing but enjoyable record that sidesteps the rap hand-wringing and telegraphed weirdness of the drama surrounding Yachty". In his review, Clayton Purdom of The A.V. Club states, "He is at his most interesting on the few occasions where he slips into a sort of uncanny valley of pop music—a bizarro fantasia that he arrives at honestly, like a less satirical PC Music". Scott Glaysher of XXL said, "For the majority of the 20 tracks, each has a different producer and no two songs sound alike. This both helps and hinders the listening experience. On one hand, the scattered sounds align perfectly with the overarching idea of wildly varying teenage emotions, but on the other, it's hard to attentively listen to all the way through—especially with a whopping 21 songs". Writing for The Line of Best Fit, Grant Rindner concluded, "Its best moments are closer to pop-punk and synth-pop than anything resembling traditional hip-hop".

== Commercial performance ==
Teenage Emotions debuted at number five on the US Billboard 200, with 46,000 album-equivalent units, of which 24,000 were streaming units and 20,000 were pure album sales.

== Track listing ==
Teenage Emotions track listing
No.	Title	Writer(s)	Producer(s)	Length
1.	"Like a Star"	Miles McCollum; Djavan Santos	D33J	3:43
2.	"DN Freestyle"	McCollum; Nasir Pemberton	Digital Nas	2:10
3.	"Peek a Boo" (featuring Migos)	McCollum; Ricky Harrell, Jr.; Quavious Marshall; Kiari Cephus; Kirsnick Ball	Ricky Racks	4:06
4.	"Dirty Mouth"	McCollum; Thomas Mann; Samuel Gloade; Lamont Porter	30 Roc; Tillie^{[a]}	2:47
5.	"Harley"	McCollum; Karl Hamnqvist	K Swisha	2:48
6.	"All Around Me" (featuring YG and Kamaiyah)	McCollum; Lexus Lewis; Keenon Jackson; Kamaiyah Johnson	Lex Luger	3:31
7.	"Say My Name"	McCollum; Tariq Sharrieff; Eric Shamsid-Deen	BLSSD; Reefer Alston	3:06
8.	"All You Had to Say"	McCollum; Isaac Bynum	Earl	3:39
9.	"Better" (featuring Stefflon Don)	McCollum; Stephanie Allen; Jonathan Yip; Jeremy Reeves; Ray Romulus; Ray McCullough	The Stereotypes	4:02
10.	"Forever Young" (featuring Diplo)	McCollum; Dexter Tortoriello; Dashiell Tortoriello; Thomas Pentz	Diplo; Dawn Golden^{[a]}	2:57
11.	"Lady in Yellow"	McCollum; Ebony Oshunrinde	WondaGurl	3:38
12.	"Moments in Time"	McCollum; Christian Boggs	Mitus	2:57
13.	"Otha Shit (Interlude)"	McCollum; Jordan Jenks	Pi'erre Bourne	0:50
14.	"X Men" (featuring Evander Griiim)	McCollum; Gloade; Mann; Porter; Evander Chantz	30 Roc; Tillie^{[a]}	2:44
15.	"Bring It Back"	McCollum; Ryan Buendia; Darnell Donohue; Jean-Baptiste Kouame; Michael McHenry; Alain Whyte	Free School	4:52
16.	"Running With a Ghost" (featuring Grace)	McCollum; Perry Moise; Grace Sewell; Sara Quin; Tegan Quin	TheGoodPerry	3:51
17.	"FYI (Know Now)"	McCollum; Peter Jennings	ILoveUPeter	2:45
18.	"Priorities"	McCollum; Hamnqvist	K Swisha	3:30
19.	"No More"	McCollum; Boggs	Mitus	3:12
20.	"Made of Glass"	McCollum; Kouame; Buendia; McHenry; Donahue; Mario Jefferson; Jonathan Buice	Free School; R!O	3:58
21.	"Momma (Outro)" (featuring Sonyae Elise)	McCollum; Benjamin Workman; Sonyae Elise	TrapMoneyBenny	4:06
Total length:				69:12

Target edition (bonus tracks)
No.	Title	Writer(s)	Producer(s)	Length
22.	"My Business"	McCollum; Bynum	Earl	3:24
23.	"Surrender" (featuring CL and Shaiana)	McCollum; Kouame; Santos; Lee Chae-rin	D33J	5:04
Total length:				77:40

Notes

- ^{^[a]} signifies a co-producer

Sample credits

- "Running With a Ghost" contains elements of "Walking With A Ghost", written by Sara Quin and Tegan Quin, as performed by Tegan and Sara.

== Personnel ==
Credits adapted from the album's liner notes.

Performance

- Lil Yachty – primary artist
- Stefflon Don – featured artist (track 9)
- Takeoff – featured artist (track 3)
- Offset – featured artist (track 3)
- CL – featured artist (track 23)
- Evander Griiim – featured artist (track 14)
- Sonyae Elise – featured artist (track 21)
- YG – featured artist (track 6)
- Kamaiyah – featured artist (track 6)
- Quavo – featured artist (track 3)
- Diplo – featured artist (track 10)
- Grace – featured artist (track 16)
- Shaiana – featured artist (track 23)
- Tillie – additional vocals (tracks 9, 11)
- Alain Whyte – guitars (track 15)
- Esther Anaya – violins (track 20)

Production

- Kevin "Coach K" Lee – executive producer
- Pierre "Pee" Thomas – executive producer
- Mitus – producer (tracks 12, 19)
- Ryan "DJ Replay" Buendia – producer (tracks 15, 20)
- Earl – producer (tracks 8, 22)
- Darnell "Got It" Donohue – producer (tracks 15, 20)
- 30 Roc – producer (tracks 4, 14)
- K Swisha – producer (tracks 5, 18)
- Ricky Racks – producer (track 3)
- R!O – producer (track 20)
- Pi'erre Bourne – producer (track 13)
- ILoveUPeter – producer (track 17)
- Jean-Baptiste – producer (tracks 15, 20)
- Lex Luger – producer (track 6)
- Ray McCullough – producer (track 9)
- Michael McHenry – producer (tracks 15, 20)
- TheGoodPerry – producer (track 16)
- WondaGurl – producer (track 11)
- Digital Nas – producer (track 2)
- Diplo – producer (track 10)
- Jeremy Reeves – producer (track 9)
- Ray Romulus – producer (track 9)
- D33J – producer (tracks 1, 23)
- Reefer Alston – producer (track 7)
- BLSSD – producer (track 7)
- TrapMoneyBenny – producer (track 21)
- Jonathan Yip – producer (track 9)
- Tillie – co-producer (tracks 4, 14)
- Dawn Golden – producer (track 10)

Technical

- 30 Roc – engineer
- Jason Andrews – engineer
- Cee Copeland – assistant engineer
- Michael "MikFly" Dottin – engineer
- Stephen "DotCom" Farrow – engineer, mixing assistant
- Todd Hurtt – assistant engineer
- Christian Kuya – engineer
- Colin Leonard – mastering
- Tillie – engineer, mixing
- Daryl "DJ Durel" McPherson – engineer
- Michael Piroli – mixing assistant
- Alex "MixedByLex" Romero – assistant engineer
- D33J – engineer
- Ethan Stevens – engineer
- Brandon Suwinski – mixing assistant
- Princston "Perfect Harmany" Terry – mixing assistant
- Jordan "J Rich" Walker – engineer

Miscellaneous

- Mihailo Andic – art direction
- Kenneth Cappello – photography

== Charts ==
=== Weekly charts ===
Chart performance for Teenage Emotions
Chart (2017)	Peak position
Australian Albums (ARIA)	62
Canadian Albums (Billboard)	17
Dutch Albums (Album Top 100)	56
French Albums (SNEP)	171
New Zealand Albums (RMNZ)	37
Norwegian Albums (VG-lista)	27
UK Albums (OCC)	70
US Billboard 200	5
US Top R&B/Hip-Hop Albums (Billboard)	4

=== Year-end charts ===
2017 year-end chart performance for Teenage Emotions
Chart (2017)	Position
US Top R&B/Hip-Hop Albums (Billboard)	92
