= TheGoodPerry =

- Also known as: Perry; TheGoodPerry; Burberry Perry; Lil Perry; Perry24k; TG Perry
- Born: Perry Paris Moise; September 21, 1996 (age 29); Nyack, New York, United States
- Genres: Hip hop; cloud rap; trap
- Occupations: Record producer; rapper; singer; songwriter
- Instruments: FL Studio; vocals
- Years active: 2015
- Label: Quality Control

Perry Paris Moise (born September 21, 1996), better known by his stage name TheGoodPerry (formerly known as Burberry Perry), is an American record producer and hip hop recording artist. Perry gained recognition for his production in Lil Yachty's hit debut single "One Night" from his debut mixtape Lil Boat in 2016. In May 2016, Perry released his debut self-titled EP Burberry Perry. On July 27, 2016, Perry changed his name from Burberry Perry to TheGoodPerry because of a lawsuit filed from the British clothing-line Burberry. Perry frequently collaborates with Lil Yachty, playing a part in Summer Songs 2. On March 16, 2018, Lil Yachty explained on Twitter how he and Perry do not talk anymore, but they do not necessarily have beef.

== Legal issues ==
On July 25, 2016, British clothing line Burberry sued Perry for using their name for his own personal profit. The company also sued for his cover artwork on his self-titled EP Burberry Perry, which featured an altered version of the Burberry plaid design and knight logo. In response, Perry changed his name from Burberry Perry to TheGoodPerry.

== Discography ==
=== Extended plays ===
List of EPs and selected details
Title	Album details
Burberry Perry	Released: May 4, 2016; Label: Self-released; Format: Digital download

=== Mixtapes ===
List of mixtapes and selected details
Title	Album details
Make It Home Safe	Released: 2017; Label: Quality Control; Format: Digital download

=== Singles ===
==== As lead artist ====
List of singles, with year released and album name
Title	Year	Album
"1500" (featuring Lil Yachty)	2015	Burberry Perry EP
"Beautiful Day" (featuring Lil Yachty & Kylie Jenner)	2015	Burberry Perry EP
"Side Piece"	2016	Non-album singles
"June"	2016	Non-album singles
"Blueberry"	2016	Non-album singles
"IDK" (featuring Sonyae)	2017	Non-album singles
"Cold Outside"	2017	Non-album singles
"Shady"	2017	Non-album singles
"Werk"	2017	Non-album singles
"Lean on Me" (featuring JBAN$2TURNT and Kodie Shane)	2017	Non-album singles
"Outta School"	2017	Non-album singles
"Stack" (featuring Tane Runo)	2017	Make It Home Safe

=== Guest appearances ===
List of singles, with year released and album name
Title	Year	Album
"Wanna Be Us" (Lil Yachty featuring TheGoodPerry)	2016	Lil Boat
"I'm Sorry" (Lil Yachty featuring TheGoodPerry)	2016	Lil Boat
"Pretty" (Lil Yachty featuring TheGoodPerry)	2016	Summer Songs 2
"Such Ease" (Lil Yachty featuring TheGoodPerry and Tyler Royale)	2016	Summer Songs 2
"All In" (Lil Yachty featuring Byou, Kay The Yacht, TheGoodPerry, BigBruthaChubba, Soop, JBans2Turnt, Kodie Shane & Ksupreme)	2016	Summer Songs 2

== Production discography ==
=== 2015 ===
Wintertime Zi and Lil Yachty – Hey Honey, Let's Spend Wintertime On a Boat

- 01. "Courtside Choppas"
- 03. "Mossed" (featuring Nessly)
- 04. "Remember December"

=== 2016 ===
Lil Yachty – Lil Boat

- 01. "Intro / Just Keep Swimming"
- 02. "Wanna Be Us" (featuring TheGoodPerry) [produced with Colby Crump]
- 10. "One Night"
- 13. "I'm Sorry" (featuring TheGoodPerry)
- 14. "We Did It (Positivity Song)"

Lil Yachty – Summer Songs 2

- 01. "Intro (First Day of Summer)"
- 10. "Yeah Yeah"
- 12. "Such Ease" (featuring TheGoodPerry and Tyler Royale)

=== 2017 ===
Lil Yachty – Teenage Emotions

- 16. "Running with the Ghost" (featuring Grace)

=== 2018 ===
ELS – What Girls Do – feat. Lil Pump – Single

- 1. "What Girls Do" (featuring Lil Pump)
