= Elisakh Hagia =

Indonesian rapper

- Also known as: ELS
- Born: Elisakh Hagia; 23 January 2008 (age 18); Bogor, Indonesia
- Genre: Hip hop
- Occupations: Rapper; singer; dancer
- Years active: 2015–present
- Label: El Generation Records

Elisakh Hagia (born 23 January 2008), known professionally as ELS, is an Indonesian rapper, singer, and dancer. She is best known for the songs SLIDE featuring Silentó and What Els featuring Zay Hilfigerrr.

== Early life and career ==
Hagia was born in Bogor, Indonesia, before moving to Jogjakarta to focus on performing. She started singing when she was 4 years old and initially taught herself on YouTube before taking professional singing lessons. She discovered a passion for hip hop and is inspired by the artists Jessie J and Bruno Mars.

In February 2017, Hagia composed a song with rapper Silentó called SLIDE, which reached 3 million streams within 2 weeks on SoundCloud and, as of March 2018, has over 30 million streams. The promoter of Urban Street Jam and Silentó invited her through social media to perform.

In March 2017, Hagia performed to represent Indonesia at the Urban Street Jam. In April 2017, she released her second song What Els on SoundCloud with lyrics she wrote herself. She expressed the hope to inspire other children with the song. She performed it for the first time on Kompas TV. In July 2017, she performed with Silentó for the first time at Electric Run Malaysia.

In August 2017, Hagia held an audition for young dancers under 17 years old to perform with her in her second single. Four dancers were chosen from the audition, whom she took to her performance at the Development Basketball League (DBL) Indonesia. She performed at the 2017 KAGAMA Kangen Gathering event at Ecovention Hall, Ancol.

== Discography ==
=== Singles ===
- What Els (feat. Zay Hilfigerrr) (2017)
- Slide (feat. Silentó) (2017)

=== Featured Artist Singles ===
- Pay You Back (Mir Money feat. ELS) (2018)

== Filmography ==
Film
Year	Title	Role	Notes
2018	Second Chance	Grace	Lead role, Film

== Television appearances ==
Television
Year	Title	Role	Channel
2017	Loe Lebay	Herself	O Channel TV
2017	Liputan 6	Herself	SCTV
2017	Sarah Sechan Show	Herself	Net TV
2017	Hitam Putih	Herself	Trans TV
2017	Sapa Indonesia	Herself	Kompas TV
2017	Little VIP	Herself	MetroTV
2017	Little Big Shot	Herself	Global TV
2017	Pagi-Pagi	Herself	Net TV
2017	Nusantara Kini Pagi	Herself	Jawapos TV
2017	Michael Tjandra Luar Biasa	Herself	RTV
2017	Indonesia Morning Show	Herself	Net TV

== Live performances ==
- DBL Indonesia
- Temu Kangen KAGAMA
- Electric Run Malaysia (with Silentó)
- Seoul on Stage
