= Picaboo =

Self-publishing and printing service

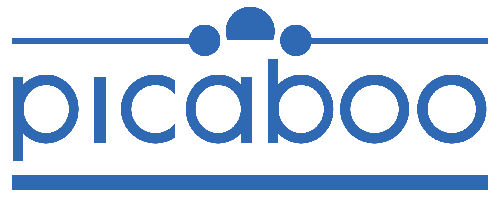
- Industry: Photography products, Printing
- Founded: 2002
- Founders: Howard Field and Kevin McCurdy
- Headquarters: Hanover, New Hampshire
- Products: Photo sharing, Photo products
- Website: picaboo.com

Picaboo is a web-based image self-publishing and printing service based in Hanover, New Hampshire. Customers can upload their digital photos through Picaboo's in-browser application and create a variety of personalized photo products.

== History ==
Picaboo was founded in 2002 in Palo Alto, California by Babson College classmates, Howard Field and Kevin McCurdy. Series-A funding was secured from Kleiner Perkins and Softbank. The first version of its photo editor was launched in 2005. Originally available as a downloadable desktop application, Picaboo has since retired its desktop application for an exclusively browser-based flash application. In 2025 Picaboo was purchased by Entrouage Yearbooks and the company relocated its headquarters to Princeton, NJ.

== Products ==
Picaboo’s software allows users to customize and order photo books and a variety of other products like canvas prints, posters, calendars, greeting cards, etc. Picaboo customers can personalize their products by adding photos and captions. The software allows the user to customize various features, including backgrounds and pre set templates and layouts. The finishing of the cover can also be customized using different materials like cardboard, padded leather or linen. Additionally the customer can choose to include die cuts or engrave the title with gold stamping.

In September 2012, the company launched "Picaboo Yearbooks", a web application for creating yearbooks and managing yearbook sales via an online storefront. The yearbook division was acquired by Vidigami in July 2017.

In September 2019, RPI announced its acquisition of Picaboo for an undisclosed amount.

== Reviews ==
In December 2012, The Wall Street Journal, despite mentioning that Picaboo's tool lacked tips or suggestions for new users, rated it the top photo book creator in terms of finished product quality in comparison to three other photo-book services. According to a 2017 review by Tom's Guide, the strong points of Picaboo are the easy-to-use interface and the extensive search engine for clip art, and on the negative side, a lower than expected quality of the printed pictures and fonts. PC Magazine praised the quality of the printed photo-book. In a December 2018 review, PC World found the quality of the book to be good, but criticized the lack of gift packaging options and inconsistency in photo reproduction when source pictures had lower resolution.

== See also ==
- Photo-book
- Snapfish
- Shutterfly
- Mixbook
- Blurb, Inc.
- Lulu (company)
