= Summer Songs 2 =

Mixtape by Lil Yachty
- Released: July 20, 2016
- Recorded: 2016
- Genre: Chillwave; trap
- Length: 51:30
- Label: Quality Control; Capitol; Motown
- Producer: TheGoodPerry; 1Mind; Chris Fresh; D33J; Earl; Free School; ILoveUPeter; Khalil Byous; Misogi; Sage; Wizard Beatz

Lil Yachty chronology
| Lil Boat (2016) | Summer Songs 2 (2016) | Teenage Emotions (2017) |

Summer Songs 2 is the second commercial mixtape by American rapper Lil Yachty. It was released on July 20, 2016, exclusively on Apple Music, with other streaming services following the release. The mixtape features guest appearances from TheGoodPerry, G Herbo, JBan$2Turnt, Byou, Big Brutha Chubba, Offset, Tyler Royale, K$upreme and Cook Laflare, among others. The production from the mixtape was handled by TheGoodPerry, Wizard Beatz, D33J, Misogi, ILoveUPeter, Chris Fresh, Khalil Byous, Earl, 1Mind, Sage and Free School.

== Critical reception ==
Professional ratings
Review scores
| Source | Rating |
|---|---|
| AllMusic | 2/5 stars |
| Exclaim! | 7/10 |
| Pitchfork | 6.1/10 |
| XXL | 3/5 |

Writing for Exclaim!, Chris Dart called it a "mix of likeability and being at the right place at the right time", and praised the production, which he stated "runs the gamut from chillwave to experimental keyboard soundscapes to something best described as what would happen you force fed trap music through an '80s soft rock band." Pitchfork wrote that "Yachty is delivering an aesthetic, which is catnip to some (mostly those 25 and under) and repellent to others. But if you're locked in, Summer Songs 2 can be a lot of fun."

Tiny Mix Tapes highlighted the mixtape in their monthly roundup, describing it as "another mega ray of light to a chorus of auto-tuned cheers and boat ad-libs", describing the songs as "fresh air in a stiff room, and damn if this world doesn't need more of it".

== Track listing ==
Summer Songs 2 track listing
| No. | Title | Writer(s) | Producer(s) | Length |
|---|---|---|---|---|
| 1. | "Intro (First Day of Summer)" | Miles McCollum; Perry Moise; Dontarian Hollis | TheGoodPerry | 4:55 |
| 2. | "For Hot 97" (featuring JBan$2Turnt, Byou and Big Brutha Chubba) | McCollum; Hollis; Quantavious Arnold; Abdomalik Amissou; Josh Heathe | Wizard Beatz | 3:15 |
| 3. | "IDK" | McCollum; Djavan Santos | D33J | 2:40 |
| 4. | "King of Teens" | McCollum; Zain Siddiqui | Misogi | 2:15 |
| 5. | "Shoot Out the Roof" | McCollum; Peter Jennings | ILoveUPeter | 2:24 |
| 6. | "Why? (Interlude)" | McCollum; Hollis; Khalil Byous | Byous | 2:18 |
| 7. | "Up Next 3" (featuring G Herbo) | McCollum; Herbert Wright; Christopher McCambry | Chris Fresh | 2:35 |
| 8. | "DipSet" (featuring Offset) | McCollum; Byous; Hollis; Kiari Cephus | Byous | 2:52 |
| 9. | "Life Goes On" (featuring Cook LaFlare) | McCollum; Isaac Bynum; Gregory Palmer | Earl | 4:11 |
| 10. | "Yeah Yeah" | McCollum; Moise | TheGoodPerry | 4:05 |
| 11. | "Pretty" (featuring TheGoodPerry) | McCollum; Moise; McCullough Sutphin | 1Mind | 4:43 |
| 12. | "Such Ease" (featuring TheGoodPerry and Tyler Royale) | McCollum; Moise; Tyler Royale | TheGoodPerry | 3:56 |
| 13. | "All In" (featuring TheGoodPerry, Byou, Kay the Yacht, Big Brutha Chubba, Soop, JBan$2Turnt, Kodie Shane and K$upreme) | McCollum; Moise; Hollis; Arnold; Bobby Lowery, Jr.; Kwaku Poku; Anthony Soopal; Josh Heath; Kodie Marr; Khalil Dalton | Sage | 6:29 |
| 14. | "So Many People" | McCollum; Jean-Baptiste Kouame; Michael McHenry; Ryan Buendia | Free School | 4:43 |
| Total length: | | | | 51:30 |

== Charts ==
Chart performance for Summer Songs 2
| Chart (2016) | Peak position |
|---|---|
| US Billboard 200 | 197 |
| US Top R&B/Hip-Hop Albums (Billboard) | 44 |
