= Peek a Boo (Lil Yachty song) =

"Peek A Boo"

Single by Lil Yachty featuring Migos

from the album Teenage Emotions
- Released: April 14, 2017
- Genre: Hip hop; trap; dirty rap; gangsta rap; mumble rap
- Length: 4:06
- Label: Capitol; Motown; Quality Control
- Songwriters: Miles McCollum; Ricky Harrell, Jr.; Quavious Marshall; Kiari Cephus; Kirsnick Ball
- Producer: Ricky Racks

Lil Yachty singles chronology
"From the D to the A" (2017)	"Peek A Boo" (2017)	"Honor" (2017)

Migos singles chronology
"Gucci on My" (2017)	"Peek a Boo" (2017)	"Bon Appétit" (2017)

Music video
- "Peek A Boo" on YouTube

"Peek A Boo" is a song by American rapper Lil Yachty featuring American rap trio Migos, released on April 14, 2017 as the second single from the former's debut studio album album Teenage Emotions. It reached number 78 on the Billboard Hot 100 and was certified Platinum by the RIAA. The music video for the song was released the same day the song was released. Before its official release, Lil Yachty released a short snippet on his Instagram account.

== Lyrics ==
The song features Lil Yachty comparing his playing with different individuals and items to that of the game peek a boo, and referring several pop culture franchises like Pokémon and Blue's Clues.

The song received particular attention for Lil Yachty's line "She blow that dick like a cello". Many pointed out that the cello is a string instrument, not a woodwind instrument. Lil Yachty later left a verified annotation on Genius explaining that he thought a cello was a woodwind instrument, and blamed his A&R for "listen[ing] to that song many times" and "allow[ing him] to say that". While trying to explain the line, Lil Yachty attracted further ridicule; he said he "thought Squidward played the cello, he don't, that's a flute", as Squidward actually plays a clarinet.

== Charts ==
Chart performance for "Peek a Boo"
Chart (2017)	Peak position
Canada Hot 100 (Billboard)	73
US Billboard Hot 100	78
US Hot R&B/Hip-Hop Songs (Billboard)	33

== Certifications ==
Certifications for "Peek a Boo"
Region	Certification	Certified units/sales
United States (RIAA)	Platinum	1,000,000^{‡}
^{‡} Sales+streaming figures based on certification alone.
