= The Secret Recipe =

2023 single by Lil Yachty and J. Cole

Single by Lil Yachty and J. Cole

from the EP The Secret Recipe
- Released: September 28, 2023
- Genre: Drumless hip hop
- Length: 4:08
- Songwriters: Miles McCollum; Jermaine Cole; Reginald D. Griffin
- Producers: Lil Yachty; Rawbone; 98k

Lil Yachty singles chronology
"Tesla" (2023)	"The Secret Recipe" (2023)

J. Cole singles chronology
"There I Go" (2023)	"The Secret Recipe" (2023)	"First Person Shooter" (2023)

"The Secret Recipe" is a song by American rappers Lil Yachty and J. Cole. It was released on September 29, 2023, as the lead single from the former's EP of the same name. Lil Yachty and Cole wrote the song with the former producing alongside Rawbone and 98k.

== Background ==
Following anti-J. Cole tweets by Lil Yachty in 2011 and 2012, the two were believed to have "beef". Following "Everybody Dies", a 2016 J. Cole song containing a perceived diss at Lil Yachty, Lil Yachty said that he doesn't listen to J. Cole, but he "fuck(s) with J. Cole".

== Composition and lyrics ==
"The Secret Recipe" contains a jazz-infused beat, with similar traits to Lil Yachty's psychedelic rock influenced Lets Start Here.

Lil Yachty raps about his sobriety, echoing a statement made during a Rolling Stone interview earlier in the year. He said "I can’t record music on drugs. I have to be fully sober", further explaining that "I don't have to be high to make it sound high." J. Cole discusses his dissatisfaction with the hip hop industry, specifically calling out faux-activists who use social issues to gain fame.

== Charts ==
Chart performance for "The Secret Recipe"
Chart (2023)	Peak position
US Billboard Hot 100	92
US Hot R&B/Hip-Hop Songs (Billboard)	31
