= Mixbook =

Internet-based photo design tool

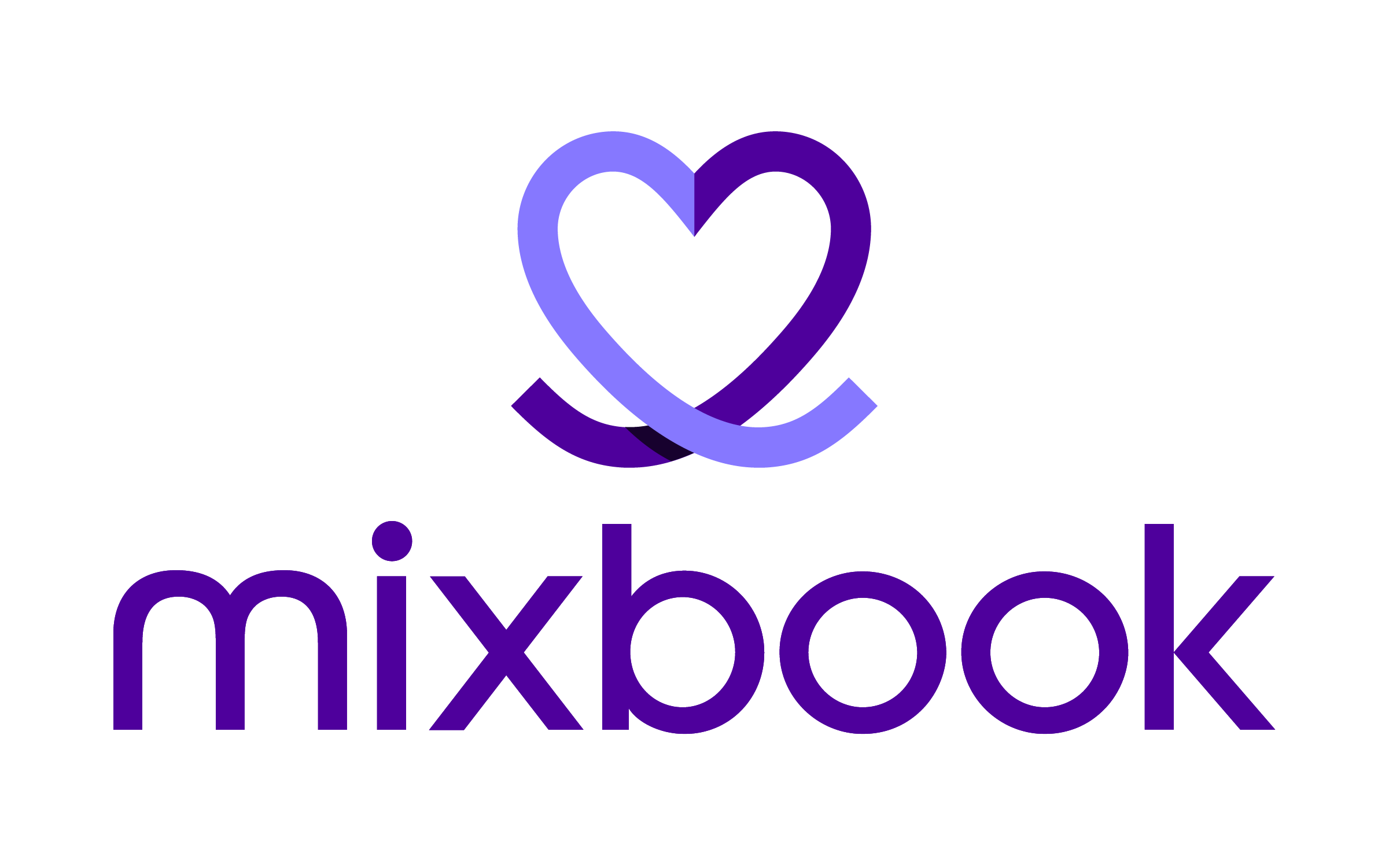
- Type: Private
- Industry: photo books, Photograph-derived manufacture, photo sharing
- Founded: 2006; 20 years ago
- Founders: Andrew Laffoon, Aryk Grosz
- Headquarters: Redwood City, California, U.S.
- Website: mixbook.com

Mixbook is a photo book brand based in Redwood City, California offering customizable photo books, cards, calendars and home decor.

== History ==
Mixbook offers an online platform for creating customizable photo books, cards, calendars, and home decor items. Customers design products using the company's web-based editor, Mixbook Studio, which includes AI-powered tools for layout suggestions, caption generation, photo enhancement, and location-based map customization.

Co-founded in 2006 by Andrew Laffoon and Aryk Grosz. In 2010, Mixbook added calendars and photo cards to its product line.

In 2011, Mixbook expanded its reach and revenue fourfold, acquiring Scrapblog and raising $10M from Level Equity. In 2012, Mixbook released new features to its photo book editor tool, enabling users to customize with Instagram photos. It also released a photo book app called Mosaic, which allowed users to build a book with photos found on their mobile device. In 2013 the company launched a streamlined web-based photo book service called Montage. In 2023 the company launched Mixbook Studio, a photo book builder that uses machine learning.

In 2024, the company introduced Mixbook Movies, a digital format that automatically generates a shareable video from a customer's photo book order. In 2026, the company introduced Story Mode, a prompt-based creation tool that allows users to describe a memory in text, upload photos, and receive a fully designed photo book assisted by AI.

== Acquisitions ==
- WedPics, acquired in 2017.
- Scrapblog, acquired in 2011 - Scrapblog had raised $11.5M from Steamboat Ventures and Longworth Venture Partners, Disney's venture capital arm
- Yobongo, acquired in 2012 - Yobongo had raised $1.35 million from True Ventures, Freestyle Capital, Mitch Kapor and others. The Yobongo team helped develop Mixbook's mobile app, Mosaic.
