= One Night (Lil Yachty song) =

Single by Lil Yachty

from the album Lil Boat
- Released: August 19, 2015
- Recorded: 2015
- Genre: Hip hop; trap; alternative R&B; cloud rap
- Length: 4:03
- Label: Quality Control; Capitol; Motown
- Songwriters: Miles McCollum; Perry Moise
- Producer: TheGoodPerry

Lil Yachty singles chronology
"One Night" (2015)	"Minnesota" (2016)

"One Night" (originally titled "1Night") is the debut single by American rapper Lil Yachty. It is the lead single from Yachty's debut mixtape, Lil Boat (2016). The song was produced by TheGoodPerry.

"One Night" originally appeared in a viral video on YouTube named "When Bae Hits You With That "So What Are We?". As a result, the song has received more than 39 million plays on Yachty's SoundCloud.

The single has peaked at number 49 on the US Billboard Hot 100. The single was certified Platinum by the Recording Industry Association of America (RIAA).

== Music video ==
The music video of "One Night" was uploaded to YouTube on Lil Yachty's channel on May 23, 2016, and has received over 135 million views as of Nov 2026.

== Charts ==
=== Weekly charts ===
Chart (2016)	Peak position
US Billboard Hot 100	49
US Hot R&B/Hip-Hop Songs (Billboard)	18
US Hot Rap Songs (Billboard)	13

=== Year-end charts ===
Chart (2016)	Position
US Hot R&B/Hip-Hop Songs (Billboard)	55

== Certifications ==
Region	Certification	Certified units/sales
Australia (ARIA)	Gold	35,000^{‡}
United States (RIAA)	2× Platinum	2,000,000^{‡}
^{‡} Sales+streaming figures based on certification alone.
