= Lil Boat (mixtape) =

Mixtape by Lil Yachty
- Released: March 9, 2016
- Recorded: 2015–2016
- Genre: Hip-hop; trap; cloud rap
- Length: 45:52
- Label: Quality Control; Capitol; Motown
- Producer: 1Mind; Big Los; Colby Crump; Digital Nas; Ducko McFli; Earl; TheGoodPerry; Grandfero; Sage

Lil Yachty chronology
Summer Songs EP (2015)	Lil Boat (2016)	Summer Songs 2 (2016)

Singles from Lil Boat
- 1. "One Night" Released: August 19, 2015; 2. "Minnesota" Released: March 9, 2016

Lil Boat is the debut commercial mixtape by American rapper Lil Yachty. It was released on March 9, 2016, by Quality Control Music, Capitol Records and Motown. The mixtape's production was primarily provided by TheGoodPerry, along other record producers such as 1Mind, Earl, Digital Nas and Grandfero. Yachty enlisted guest appearances from Young Thug, Quavo and Byou, among others.

== Background ==
Yachty first came to prominence in December 2015 when the SoundCloud release of his song "One Night" was used in the viral comedy video "when bae asks what are we" by SenseiLeFox. In February 2016, Yachty debuted as a model in Kanye West's Yeezy Season 3 fashion line at Madison Square Garden.

The cover was designed by Mihailo Andic, using stock images and some images obtained from Tumblr.

== Critical reception ==
Professional ratings
Review scores
Source	Rating
Pitchfork	4.8/10
Tiny Mix Tapes	4/5

The mixtape was released to generally positive reviews from critics. Nick Henderson of Tiny Mix Tapes wrote that "Lil Boat is the kind of music that does not need to make a case for its own value, only judged on the intangible, absurdist metrics of its self-contained universe." Sheldon Pearce from Pitchfork was more critical and found that the mixtape "makes a grating mess of varying influences."

Complex ranked the mixtape at number 31 on its "Best Albums of 2016" list. Critic Edwin Ortiz wrote that Lil Yachty "carved out his own lane with his debut mixtape" and praised the project for "showcasing his bubble-gum trap approach to hip-hop and his delightfully weird overall individuality." Uproxx ranked the album at number 19 on its "Best Rap Albums of 2016", commenting that "Yachty uses Auto-Tune to polish and blur his sad, vindictive and romantic instincts, steering through choppy waters of adolescence with the same wide-eyed selfishness and wonder of any teenager in America."

== Track listing ==
Lil Boat track listing
No.	Title	Writer(s)	Producer(s)	Length
1.	"Intro (Just Keep Swimming)"	Miles McCollum; Perry Moise; Andrew Stanton; David Reynolds	TheGoodPerry	4:12
2.	"Wanna Be Us" (featuring TheGoodPerry)	McCollum; Moise; Colby Crump	TheGoodPerry; Crump	2:51
3.	"Minnesota" (featuring Quavo, Skippa da Flippa and Young Thug)	McCollum; Ramses Ful; Quavious Marshall; Kevin Purnell; Jeffery Williams	Grandfero	4:28
4.	"Not My Bro"	McCollum; Charles Singleton	Ducko McFli	2:23
5.	"Interlude"	McCollum; Bobby Lowery	Sage	1:18
6.	"Good Day" (featuring Skippa da Flippa)	McCollum; Purnell; Carlos Robinson	Big Los	3:18
7.	"Up Next 2" (featuring Big Brutha Chubba and Byou)	McCollum; Nasir Pemberton; Quantavious Arnold; Dontarian Hollis	Digital Nas	2:58
8.	"Run / Running"	McCollum; Isaac Bynum	Earl; Bundles^{[a]}^{[b]}	5:20
9.	"Never Switch Up"	McCollum; Lopez Alfredo	1Mind	2:41
10.	"One Night"	McCollum; Moise	TheGoodPerry	4:03
11.	"Out Late"	McCollum; Bynum; Bennet Pepple	Earl	2:40
12.	"Fucked Over"	McCollum; Singleton	Ducko McFli	2:55
13.	"I'm Sorry" (featuring TheGoodPerry)	McCollum; Moise	TheGoodPerry	3:12
14.	"We Did It (Positivity Song)"	McCollum; Moise	TheGoodPerry	3:26
Total length:				45:52

Notes

- ^{[a]} signifies an uncredited co-producer
- ^{[b]} "Run / Running" was removed from streaming services after Nintendo copyright claimed its sample.

Sample credits

- "Intro (Just Keep Swimming)" contains a sample of "Just Keep Swimming" from Finding Nemo.
- "Not My Bro" contains a sample of "Killing You", performed by Broods.
- "Good Day" contains a sample of "かけてあげる", performed by Daoko.
- "Run / Running" contains a sample of "File Select" from Super Mario 64.

== Charts ==
Chart performance for Lil Boat
Chart (2016)	Peak position
US Billboard 200	106

== Certifications ==
Certifications for Lil Boat
Region	Certification	Certified units/sales
United States (RIAA)	Gold	500,000^{‡}
^{‡} Sales+streaming figures based on certification alone.
