= Lil Yachty =

American rapper (born 1997)

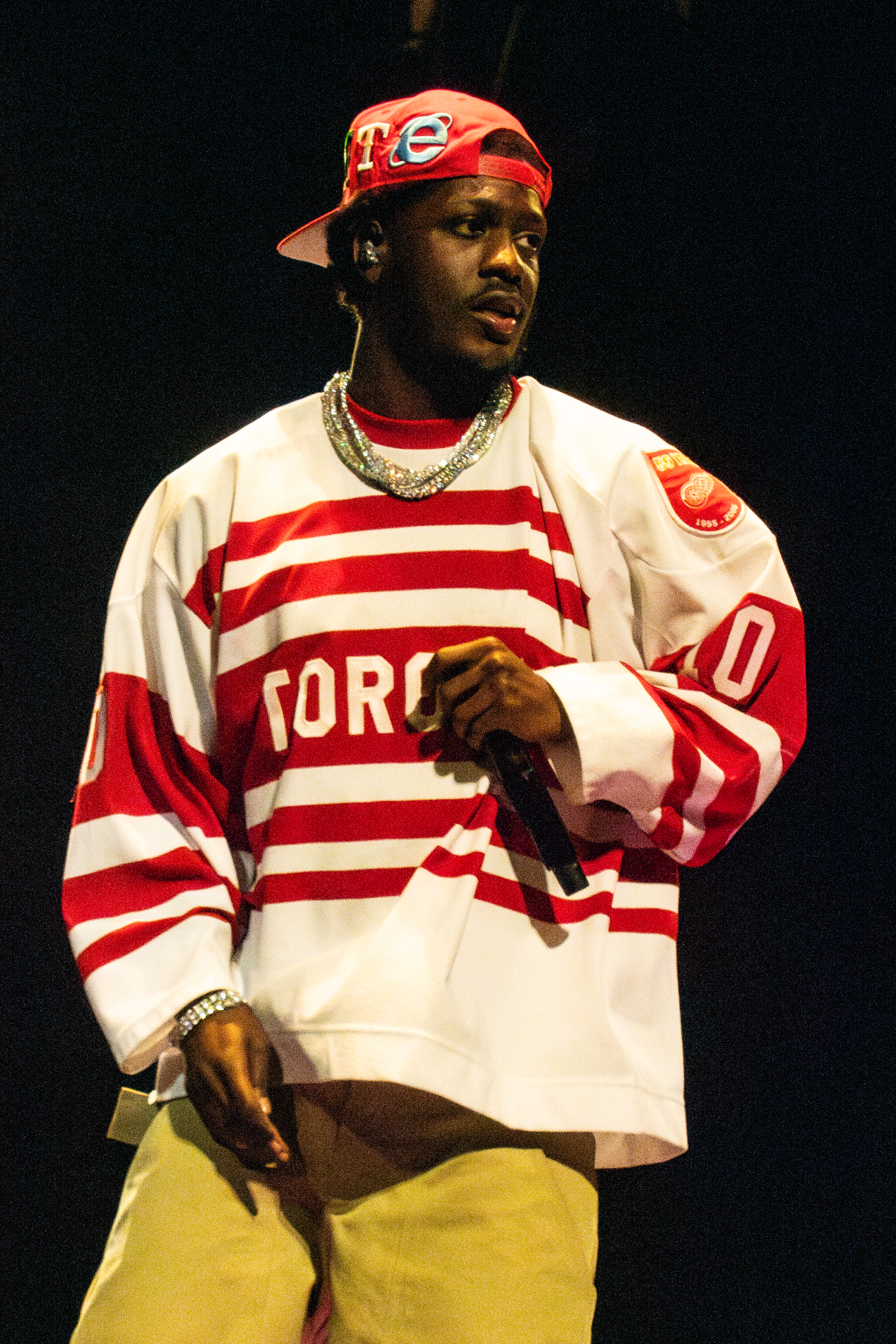
- Lil Yachty performing in 2025

Background information
- Also known as: Lil Boat; FaZe Boat; Darnell Boat; C.V. Thomas
- Born: Miles Parks McCollum; August 23, 1997 (age 29); Mableton, Georgia, U.S.
- Origin: Atlanta, Georgia, U.S.
- Genres: Southern hip-hop; trap; pop rap; mumble rap; psychedelic rock
- Occupations: Rapper; singer; songwriter; record producer
- Works: Discography; production
- Years active: 2015–present
- Labels: Quality Control; Capitol; Motown
- Member of: Concrete Boys
- Children: 1
- Website: lilyachtyofficial.com

- Professional wrestling career
- Billed height: 5 ft 11 in (180 cm)
- Billed from: Mableton, Georgia, U.S.
- Trained by: D-Von Dudley; Norman Smiley; Trick Williams; WWE Performance Center
- Debut: September 6, 2026

Miles Parks McCollum (born August 23, 1997), known professionally as Lil Yachty, is an American rapper, singer-songwriter, record producer and professional wrestling manager. He first gained recognition in August 2015 for his viral hit "One Night", the lead single from his debut extended play (EP), Summer Songs. He released his debut mixtape Lil Boat in March 2016, and signed a joint venture record deal with Motown, Capitol Records, and Quality Control Music in June of that year. In professional wrestling, he is signed to WWE, where he performs on the SmackDown brand as the on-screen manager for Trick Williams.

His debut studio album, Teenage Emotions (2017), peaked at number five on the Billboard 200 despite mixed critical response. His second album, Lil Boat 2 (2018), peaked at number two on the chart, while his third, Nuthin' 2 Prove (2018), peaked at number 12; both were met with continued unfavorable critical reception. His fourth album, Lil Boat 3 (2020), peaked at number 14, while his fifth album, Let's Start Here (2023), marked a departure from hip hop in favor of psychedelic rock and saw a critical incline. His collaborative album with English singer James Blake, Bad Cameo (2024), further experimented with the genre and was met with continued praise despite failing to chart.

McCollum is also known for his guest appearances on the 2016 singles "Broccoli" by DRAM and "ISpy" by Kyle. His former cherry-red hairstyle, lighthearted tone, and optimistic image were also centers of attention. Yachty was nominated for a Grammy Award for his work on "Broccoli".

In 2026, McCollum started making appearances for WWE as a on-screen manager for Trick Williams.

== Early life ==
McCollum was born in Mableton, Georgia. He attended Alabama State University in fall 2015 but soon dropped out to pursue his musical career. He adopted the name "Yachty" and moved from his hometown of Atlanta to New York City to launch his career. In New York, he lived with a friend and networked with online street fashion personalities, while he built up his own Instagram following. He worked at McDonald's to supplement his income early in his career.

== Career ==
=== 2015–2017: "One Night", Lil Boat, and Teenage Emotions ===
Yachty first came to prominence in December 2015 when the SoundCloud version of his song "One Night" was used in a viral comedy video.

In February 2016, Yachty debuted as a model in Kanye West's Yeezy Season 3 fashion line at Madison Square Garden. Yachty's debut mixtape Lil Boat was released in March 2016.

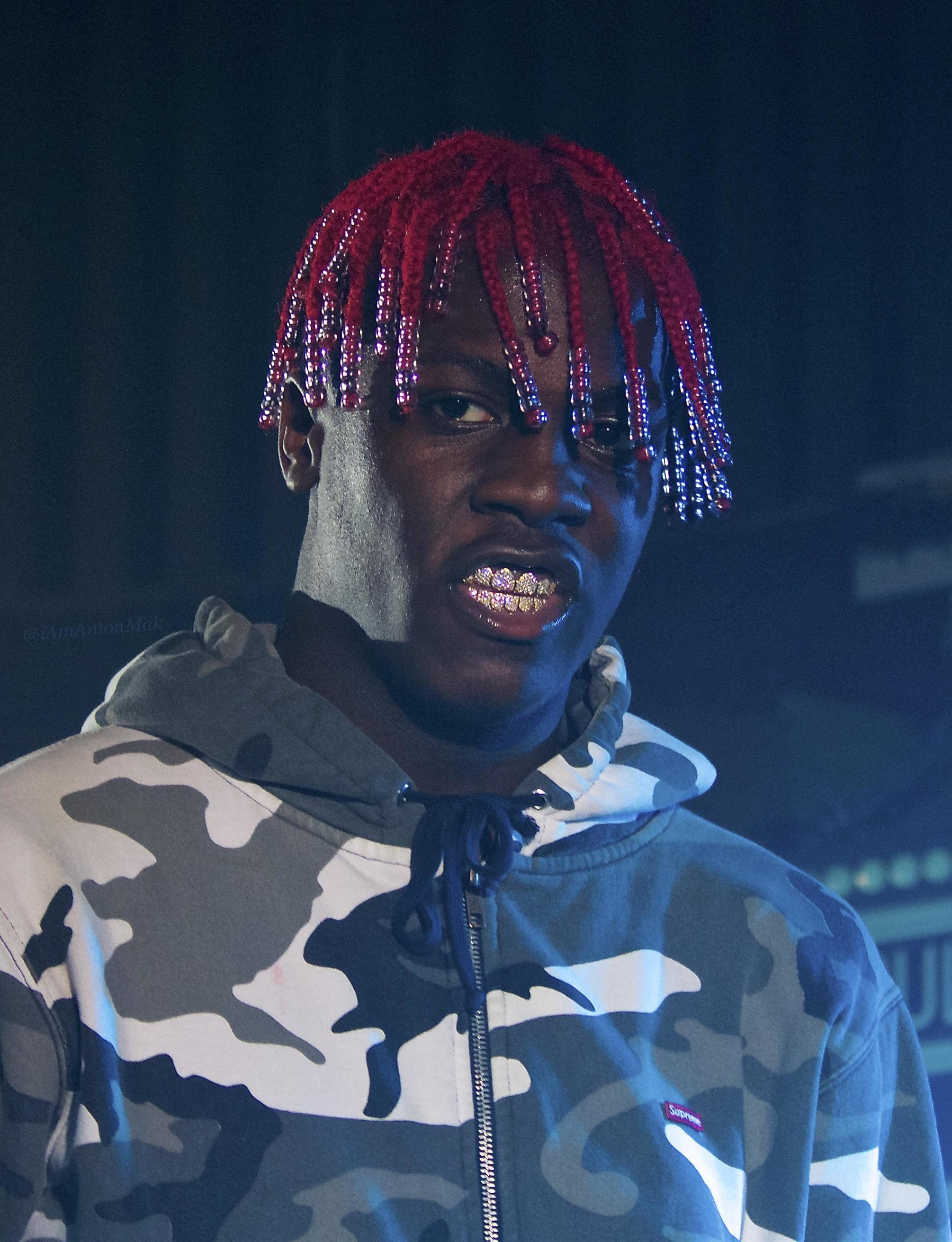
Lil Yachty in 2016

In April 2016, Yachty collaborated with DRAM on the hit song "Broccoli", which peaked at number 5 on the Billboard Hot 100. He featured on Chance the Rapper's Coloring Book mixtape, released in May 2016. On June 10, 2016, he announced he had signed a joint venture record deal with Quality Control Music, Capitol Records, and Motown Records. Yachty released his second mixtape Summer Songs 2 in July 2016 with features from G Herbo, Offset, and his former collective the "Sailing Team".

In June 2016, Lil Yachty appeared in XXL magazine as part of their 2016 Freshman Class. As part of this appearance, Yachty performed a 'freshman cypher' alongside Denzel Curry, Lil Uzi Vert, 21 Savage, and Kodak Black. As of March 2021, this cypher has received over 180 million YouTube views, by far the most for the XXL channel.

In December 2016, he was featured on the hip hop single "iSpy" by Kyle. He was featured in Tee Grizzley's single "From the D to the A", released in March 2017.

On May 26, 2017, Lil Yachty released his debut studio album, Teenage Emotions. It features guest appearances from Migos, Diplo, and YG, among others. Three promotional singles were released to coincide with the album. The first promotional single, "Harley", produced by K Swisha, was released on April 14, 2017. The second promotional single, "Bring It Back", produced by Free School, was released on May 4, 2017. The third promotional single, "X Men", produced by 30 Roc and Tillie and featuring a guest appearance from American rapper Evander Griiim, was released on May 18, 2017. He featured in a remix of "With My Team" by Creek Boyz, released December 15, 2017.

In 2017, Yachty appeared in several high-profile promotional campaigns. He starred alongside LeBron James in a Sprite commercial, where he is seen in an ice cave playing the piano. Lil Yachty was picked to be the face of the new Nautica and Urban Outfitters collection for the Spring 2017 season. Yachty also appeared in the "It Takes Two" video with Carly Rae Jepsen for Target.

=== 2018–2022: Lil Boat 2, Nuthin' 2 Prove, and Lil Boat 3 ===
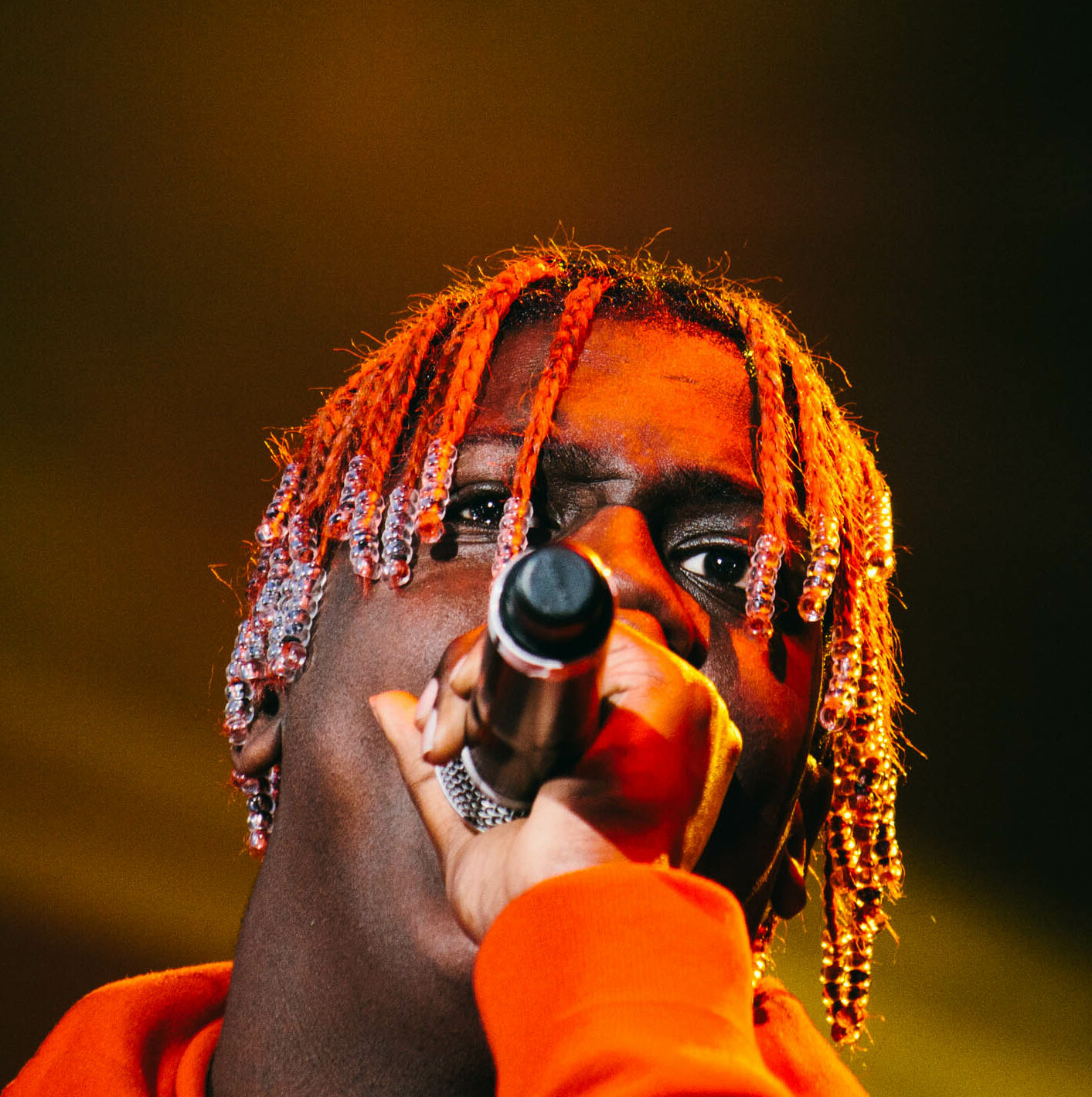
Lil Yachty performing in 2018

In January 2018, it was reported that Lil Yachty and Takeoff were working on a collaborative project. There were no updates on the project since then, and it is likely cancelled due to the death of Takeoff in November 2022. Yachty's second studio album, Lil Boat 2, was released on March 9, 2018. Despite receiving mixed reviews from critics, Lil Boat 2 performed well commercially, debuting at number two on the US Billboard 200, with 64,000 album-equivalent units. The album featured 2 Chainz, Quavo, and Offset, Ugly God, among other guests. On October 19, 2018, Yachty released his third album, Nuthin' 2 Prove. The project received similarly mixed reception and debuted at No. 12 on the Billboard 200. Also in 2018, Yachty appeared on Bhad Bhabie's platinum single "Gucci Flip Flops" and Social House's gold single "Magic in the Hamptons", and worked with Donny Osmond to create a theme song for Chef Boyardee titled "Start the Par-dee". In December 2018, E-sports group FaZe Clan announced that Yachty had become their newest member. Yachty took on the name "FaZe Boat", in reference to his 'Lil Boat' nickname and mixtape.

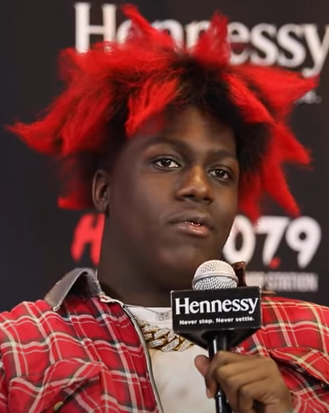
Lil Yachty in June 2019

After a relatively quiet 2019, Lil Yachty teamed up with fellow Atlanta artists Lil Keed, Lil Gotit, and veteran producer Zaytoven in February 2020 for a collaborative mixtape, A-Team. Yachty released the lead single for his next studio album, Lil Boat 3, on March 9, 2020. The song, titled "Oprah's Bank Account", features Drake and DaBaby. The release was accompanied by a 9-minute music video directed by Director X, in which Yachty dresses up as a parody of Oprah Winfrey. Lil Boat 3 was released on May 29, 2020 and debuted at number 14 on the US Billboard 200. A deluxe version of the album titled Lil Boat 3.5 was released on November 27. On October 19, 2020, Lil Yachty announced his intention to release a mixtape before the end of 2020. Michigan Boy Boat was released on April 23, 2021. The project draws heavily from the burgeoning Detroit rap scene, in contrast with Yachty's usual pop rap and Atlanta trap style.

Throughout 2020, Yachty was one of the many celebrities to gain a large following on social media app TikTok. Yachty performed the theme song for the 2020 revival of Saved by the Bell, which was a remixed version of the theme from the original television series. In early 2021, Yachty was reported to be producing and starring in a live-action movie based on the UNO card game, which is being developed by Mattel Films. Yachty is featured in the Pokémon 25th anniversary music album.

On October 11, 2022, Yachty released the non-album single "Poland", which went viral online right after.

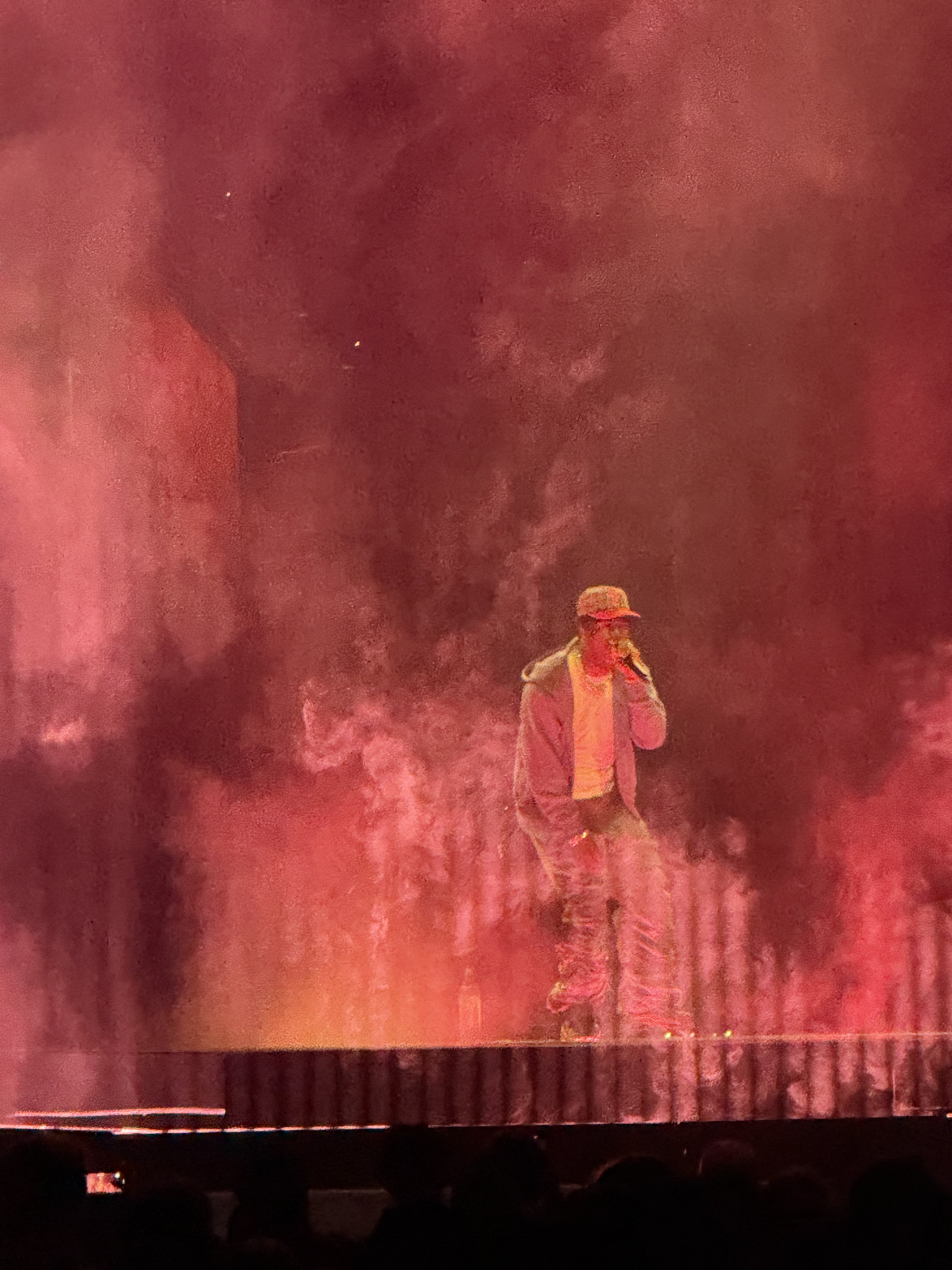
Lil Yachty performing in 2025

=== 2023–present: Let's Start Here and Bad Cameo ===
In December 2022, Yachty's fifth studio album, then rumored to be called Sonic Ranch, was leaked online. The album was a departure from Yachty's signature trap sound, and was instead heavily influenced by psychedelic rock. On January 27, 2023, the album, entitled Let's Start Here, was released to positive reviews. Several publications included the album in their lists of best albums of 2023, including Rolling Stone #4 , Billboard #8 , and Complex #10. Yachty's label and collective Concrete Boys, which includes Karrahbooo, Dc2trill, and Draft Day, released their debut single, "Mo Jams", in December 2023. Bad Cameo, a collaborative album with English producer James Blake, was released on June 28, 2024. On 23 October, 2024, it was announced Yachty would open for Tyler, the Creator on Chromakopia: The World Tour alongside hip hop duo Paris Texas.

== Musical style ==
Lil Yachty has called his style "bubblegum trap." His songs have sampled sounds from Mario Bros., Charlie Brown, the theme from Rugrats, the startup sound of a GameCube console, as well as J-pop singer Daoko. Other themes in his works include clouds, cotton candy, the Super Nintendo, and scenes from Pixar films. His friend TheGoodPerry is heavily involved in the production of his songs. Yachty's style has also been described as mumble rap.

Rolling Stone described his music as "catchy, intentionally dinky-sounding tunes packed with off-color boasts delivered in a proudly amateurish singsong." The Guardian called his music "fun, hook-first pop rap oblivious to songcraft and structure that doesn't take itself too seriously, with very little interest in legacy and even less in rap canon."

== Professional wrestling ==
=== WWE (2026–present) ===
Yachty is a longtime fan of professional wrestling, having appeared at various events for WWE in the crowd.

In March 2026, Yachty begun appearing as a manager for Trick Williams on Friday Night SmackDown, including being ringside for Williams' match at Wrestlemania 42. On the August 21 episode of SmackDown, Yachty was announced make his in-ring debut against WWE United States Champion Baron Corbin with a five-minute time limit at Sunday Night's Main Event. At the event on September 6, Yachty was able to last the five-minunte time limit against Corbin. Per the added stipulation, Trick Williams received an immediate rematch for the United States Championship and would defeat Corbin to win the title for a second time. In a September 2026 interview with Chris Van Vliet, Yachty announced that he had signed an official contract with WWE.

== Personal life ==
Yachty expressed support for Bernie Sanders in the 2016 presidential election, and praised Sanders for his work during the civil rights movement.

On October 20, 2021, Yachty welcomed a daughter named Varsity with designer Selangie Henriquez. He has chosen to keep his daughter out of the public eye.

On December 20, 2018, Yachty signed with FaZe Clan. He has also participated in competitive Fortnite tournaments.

=== 2022 SafeMoon lawsuit ===
On February 18, 2022, in a class-action lawsuit filed against the cryptocurrency company SafeMoon that alleged the company is a pump and dump scheme, McCollum was named as a defendant along with professional boxer Jake Paul, musician Nick Carter, rapper Soulja Boy, and social media personality Ben Phillips for promoting the SafeMoon token on their social media accounts with misleading information. On the same day, the U.S. 11th Circuit Court of Appeals ruled in a lawsuit against Bitconnect that the Securities Act of 1933 extends to targeted solicitation using social media.

=== 2023 SEC lawsuit ===
In March 2023, Yachty was among eight celebrities charged by the United States Securities and Exchange Commission, with violating investor protection laws by promoting cryptocurrencies without disclosing that he was a paid sponsor. The lawsuit was connected with crypto asset entrepreneur Justin Sun's Tronix (TRX) and BitTorrent (BBT) companies. He settled the charges for over $400,000 without admitting or denying the claims.

== Filmography ==
=== Film ===
Year	Title	Role	Notes
2018	Teen Titans Go! To the Movies	Green Lantern	Voice role
2018	Life-Size 2: A Christmas Eve	The Beatboxer	
2019	Long Shot	Himself	
2019	How High 2	Roger Silas	Television film
2021	A Man Named Scott	Himself	Documentary
2022	The System	Joker	Also executive producer

=== Television ===
Year	Title	Role	Notes
2020, 2023	The Eric Andre Show	Himself	2 episodes
2023	Grown-ish	Cole Hudson	Recurring
2025	Beast Games	Himself	Episode: "Fight to Win a Private Island"
2026	WWE SmackDown	Himself	Episode: "Sunday Night's Main Event"

== Discography ==
Studio albums

- Teenage Emotions (2017)
- Lil Boat 2 (2018)
- Nuthin' 2 Prove (2018)
- Lil Boat 3 (2020)
- Let's Start Here (2023)

Collaborative albums

- Bad Cameo (with James Blake) (2024)

== Awards and nominations ==
=== Billboard Music Awards ===
Year	Nominee / work	Award	Result
2017	"Broccoli" (with DRAM)	Top Rap Collaboration	Nominated
2017	"Broccoli" (with DRAM)	Top Rap Song	Nominated
2017	"Broccoli" (with DRAM)	Top Streaming Song (Audio)	Nominated

=== MTV Video Music Awards ===
Year	Nominee / work	Award	Result
2017	"Broccoli" (with DRAM)	Best Hip Hop Video	Nominated
2017	"Broccoli" (with DRAM)	Best Collaboration	Nominated
2017	"iSpy" (with Kyle)	Best Visual Effects	Nominated

=== Other awards ===
Year	Awards	Category	Nominated work	Result
2017	Grammy Awards	Best Rap/Sung Collaboration	"Broccoli" (with DRAM)	Nominated
2017	iHeartRadio Much Music Video Awards	Best New International Artist	Himself	Nominated
2017	MTV Europe Music Awards	Best Video	"iSpy" (with Kyle)	Nominated
2022	Grammy Awards	Album of the Year	Donda (as a featured artist)	Nominated
2023	BMI R&B/Hip-Hop Awards	Producer of the Year	Himself	Won
2024	Berlin Music Video Awards	Best Director	Say Something	Nominated
