= Fire Hazard (mixtape) =

Mixtape by Lil Gnar
- Released: September 20, 2019
- Recorded: 2018-2019
- Genres: Hip hop; trap; rap; emo rap
- Length: 32:26
- Label: TenThousand Projects
- Producers: Ambezza; Based1; damn james!; Dee Money; DP Beats; E-Trou; Lex Luger; mjNichols; Neek; Nova; OG Parker; Outtatown; Romano; S.L.M.N; Tito Beats; TM88; YAYGO; YoungKio

Lil Gnar chronology
GNAR Lif3 (2018)	Fire Hazard (2019)	Big Bad Gnar Shit 2 (2020)

Singles from Fire Hazard
- 1. "Death Note" Released: June 4, 2019; 2. "Octane Sex" Released: July 12, 2019; 3. "Cabbage" Released: August 9, 2019

Fire Hazard (stylized in uppercase) is the second mixtape by American rapper Lil Gnar. It was released on September 20, 2019, by TenThousand Projects. The album features guest appearances from YBN Nahmir, Thouxanbanfauni, Lil Yachty, Lil Skies, Craig Xen, Germ, UnoTheActivist, Robb Banks, Tyla Yaweh and Lil Tracy.

== Singles ==
The mixtape's lead single "Death Note" was released on June 4, 2019 and features appearances from both Lil Skies and Craig Xen. The song received a Lyrical Lemonade music video, released the same day. As of April 2, 2024 the video has surpassed 19 million views on YouTube and the song has surpassed 74 million streams on Spotify. The song was certified gold by the RIAA on October 21, 2022.

The second single, "Octane Sex", was released on July 12, 2019. The third and final single, "Cabbage" (stylised in uppercase), released August 9, 2019.

== Track listing ==
No.	Title	Writer(s)	Producer(s)	Length
1.	"Rockstar Flow"	Caleb Shepard; Tito Beats; Neek; Ben Sturdivant	Tito Beats; Neek; Based1	2:13
2.	"Octane Sex"	Shepard; Tee Romano; Joshua Parker	Romano; OG Parker	2:02
3.	"Ride Wit Da Fye, Pt. 2" (featuring YBN Nahmir)	Shepard; Nick Simmons; Kiowa Roukema	YoungKio	3:14
4.	"Cobain" (featuring Thouxanbanfauni)	Shepard; Taajwar Latimore; Maxwell Nichols; Elias Latrou	mjNichols; E-Trou	2:30
5.	"Eastside" (featuring Lil Yachty)	Shepard; Miles McCollum; Mathias Liyew; S.L.M.N	Ambezza; S.L.M.N	2:55
6.	"Death Note" (featuring Lil Skies & Craig Xen)	Shepard; Kimetrius Foose; Craig J. Gordwin; Tobias Dekker; Bryan Simmons	Outtatown; TM88	2:47
7.	"On Sight"	Shepard; Lexus Lewis	Lex Luger	1:54
8.	"Background" (featuring Germ & UnoTheActivist)	Shepard; Jerry Antoine; Troy Lane; Darius Lassiter	Dee Money	3:00
9.	"War Paint" (featuring Robb Banks & Tyla Yaweh)	Shepard; Richard Burrell; Tyla Brown; Nova	Nova	3:13
10.	"Bad Memories" (featuring Lil Tracy)	Shepard; Jazz Butler; James Royo	damn james!	3:04
11.	"Balmain Biker"	Shepard; Don Paschall	DP Beats	2:55
12.	"Cabbage"	Shepard; Diego Farias	YAYGO	2:33
Total length:				32:26

Notes:

- "On Sight" and "Cabbage" are stylised in uppercase.
- "Ride Wit Da Fye, Pt. 2" is stylised as "Ride Wit Da Fye, PT. 2"
