= Lil Gnar =

American singer and rapper (born 1996)

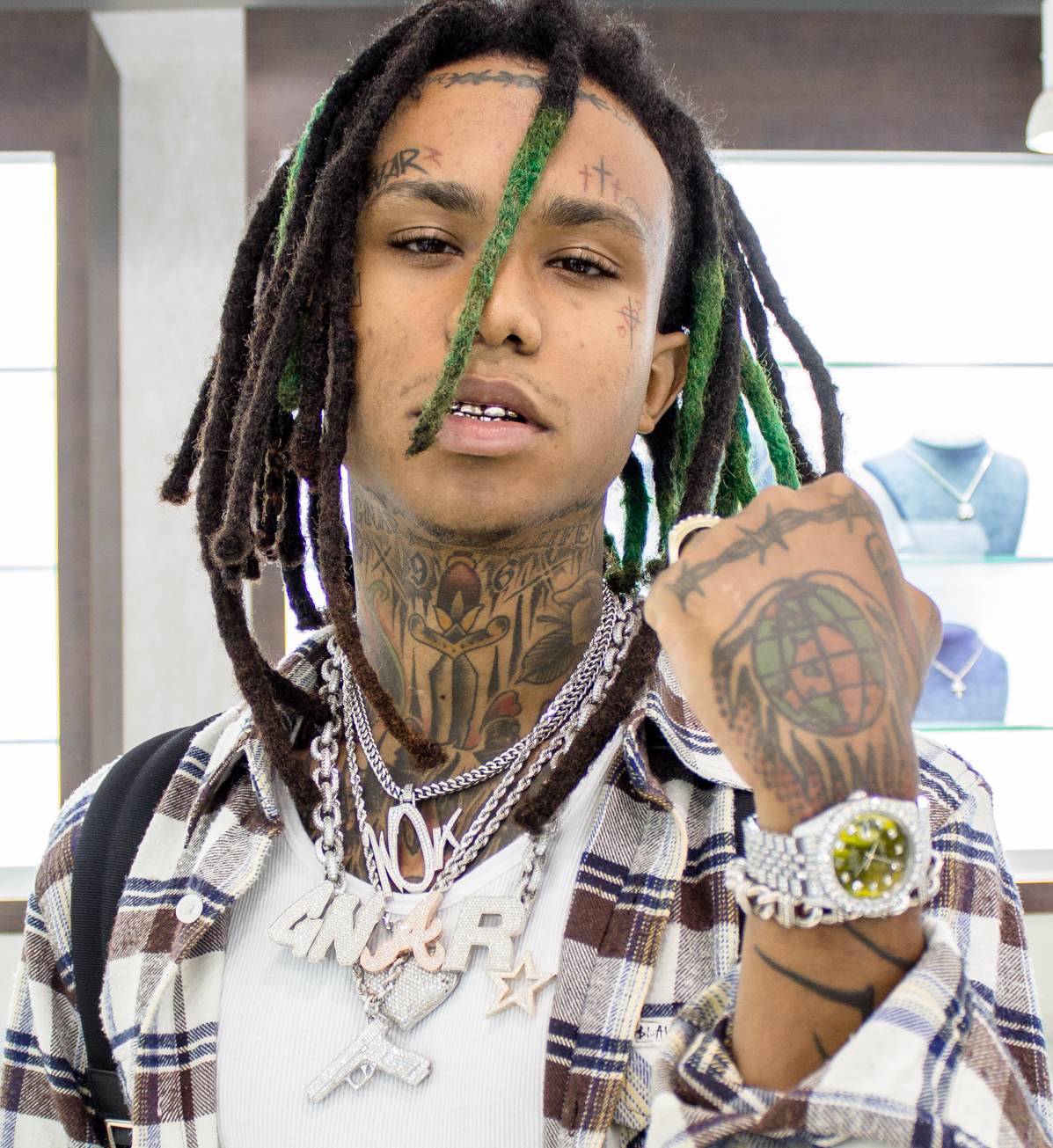
- Lil Gnar in 2019

Background information
- Born: Caleb Samuel Sheppard; February 24, 1996 (age 30); Oakland, California, U.S.
- Genres: Hip-hop; trap; trap metal; rap metal; rap rock
- Occupations: Rapper; singer
- Years active: 2018–present
- Label: 43B
- Website: lilgnar.online

Caleb Samuel Sheppard (born February 24, 1996), known professionally as Lil Gnar and simply Gnar, is an American rapper and singer based in Atlanta. He's worked with several mainstream rappers including frequent collaborator Chief Keef who has also produced for Gnar, Tory Lanez, Lil Uzi Vert, Trippie Redd, G Herbo, Nardo Wick, among others.

== Career ==
As of December 2023, Shepard has released one studio album, two mixtapes, two collaborative extended plays, and 43 singles (14 as a featured artist).

Gnar's career gained traction after he released the singles "Ride Wit Da Fye" with an accompanying video on WorldStarHipHop and "Death Note" featuring Lil Skies and Craig Xen. The "Death Note" video was shot by Cole Bennett. He self-released his debut collaboration EP, Big Bad Gnar Shit, in February 2018 with rapper Germ. He released his debut mixtape GNAR Lif3 in September 2018, featuring guest appearances from; Lil Skies, Travis Barker, IDK, and ZillaKami. Thereafter, he released his second mixtape, FIRE HAZARD, in September 2019. which featured guest appearances from; YBN Nahmir, Thouxanbanfauni, Lil Yachty, Craig Xen, Lil Skies, Germ, UnoTheActivist, Robb Banks, Tyla Yaweh, and Lil Tracy.

In February 2020, Gnar and Germ released their second collaboration EP, titled Big Bad Gnar Shit 2. Gnar released his first album, Die Bout It, in May 2022. It features guest appearances from; Tory Lanez, Yung Bans, the late Lil Keed, Yak Gotti, Trippie Redd, Germ, D. Savage, Lil Uzi Vert, Ski Mask the Slump God, Chief Keef and Lil Skies. His second studio album, In My Glory, was released on November 14, 2025. It features guest appearances by 2 Chainz, Chief Keef, Karrahbooo, Nardo Wick, Ski Mask the Slump God, UnoTheActivist, VonOff1700, and Young Nudy.

== Personal life ==
Lil Gnar was born in Oakland, California, but later moved to Patterson, California and was a very quiet and shy kid before he moved to Atlanta, Georgia.

== Discography ==
=== Studio albums ===
Title	Details
Die Bout It	Released: May 20, 2022; Label: Gnarcotic, Create Music Group; Format: Digital download, streaming
In My Glory	Released: November 14, 2025; Label: Gnarcotic, 43B; Format: Digital download, streaming

=== Mixtapes ===
Title	Album details
Gnar Lif3	Released: September 28, 2018; Label: TenThousand Projects; Format: Digital download, streaming
Fire Hazard	Released: September 20, 2019; Label: TenThousand Projects; Format: Digital download, streaming

=== Extended plays ===
Title	Details
Big Bad Gnar Shit (with Germ) (Note: "Big Bad Gnar Shit" was removed from Spotify and Apple Music and is only available on Soundcloud and YouTube.)	Released: February 14, 2018; Label: Self-released; Format: Digital download, streaming
Big Bad Gnar Shit 2 (with Germ)	Released: February 21, 2020; Label: TenThousand Projects, G*59 Records; Format: Digital download, streaming

=== Singles ===
==== As lead artist ====
List of singles as lead artist, with selected chart positions and certifications, showing year released and album name
Title	Year	Peak chart positions	Certifications	Album
Title	Year	NZ Hot	Certifications	Album
"Beatin' Down Yo Block" (featuring Shakewell)	2018	—		Non-album single
"Drop Top Benz" (featuring Lil Skies)	2018	—		GNAR Lif3
"Ice Out"	2018	—		GNAR Lif3
"Gnarcotic Gang"	2018	—		GNAR Lif3
"Kingdom Hearts Freestyle"	2019	—		Non-album singles
"Life on Fire (Jazmyns Song) "	2019	—		Non-album singles
"Death Note" (featuring Lil Skies and Craig Xen)	2019	—	RIAA: Gold	Fire Hazard
"Octane Sex"	2019	—		Fire Hazard
"Cabbage"	2019	—		Fire Hazard
"Perc 300" (with Germ)	2020	—		Big Bad Gnar Shit 2
"Jungle Boys" (with Germ)	2020	—		Big Bad Gnar Shit 2
"Brand New Booty"	2020	—		Non-album single
"Diamond Choker" (featuring Lil Uzi Vert)	2020	40		Die Bout It
"Hey!" (with Lil Keed and Internet Money)	2020	—		Non-album single
"Missiles" (featuring Trippie Redd)	2021	—		Die Bout It
"Not The Same" (featuring Lil Skies)	2021	—		Die Bout It
"New Bugatti" (with Ski Mask the Slump God, Chief Keef and DJ Scheme)	2021	38		Die Bout It
"No Regular"	2021	—		Die Bout It
"Skelly"	2021	—		Non-album singles
"Stick Baby"	2021	—		Non-album singles
"No Switches" (with Tory Lanez)	2022	—		Die Bout It
"My Bruddas" (with Yung Bans)	2022	—		Die Bout It
"Almighty Gnar" (with Chief Keef)	2022	—		In My Glory
"Triple S"	2022	—		Non-album singles
"Stonecrest"	2023	—		Non-album singles
"Dip Roll"	2023	—		Non-album singles
"PB&J" (with Chief Keef featuring Young Nudy)	2023	—		Non-album singles
"Got Da Sack" (featuring G Herbo)	2023	—		Non-album singles
"Faneto (Gnar Mix)"	2023	—		Non-album singles
"Kubki" (with Fagata)	2024	—		Non-album singles
"Tattoo"	2024	—		Non-album singles
"Gemini"	2024	—		Non-album singles
"What Up Ski"	2024	—		Non-album singles
"Pleads" (with Chief Keef and Nardo Wick)	2024	—		In My Glory
"MF Boss" (featuring Rich Homie Quan)	2025	—		Non-album single
"Beam" (featuring Ski Mask the Slump God)	2025	—		In My Glory
"Prayer" (featuring 2 Chainz)	2025	—		In My Glory

==== As featured artist ====
List of singles as lead artist, with selected chart positions and certifications, showing year released and album name
Title	Year	Peak chart positions	Certifications	Album
Title	Year	US R&B/HH Main.	Certifications	Album
"GnarlyMorty" (Lil Morty featuring Lil Gnar)	2018	—		Non-album singles
"Gang" (kizaru featuring Lil Gnar)	2018	—		Non-album singles
"Can U Feel Your Face" (Landon Cube featuring Lil Gnar)	2018	—		Orange
"Glitter" (Based Savage featuring Lil Gnar)	2020	—		Non-album singles
"Different Now" (A.Menz featuring Lil Gnar)	2020	—		Non-album singles
"Metal Gear" (Frais featuring Lil Gnar)	2021	—		Non-album singles
"Facts" (Cameron Cartee featuring Lil Gnar, Foogiano and Yak Gotti)	2021	—		Non-album singles
"Problem Child" (Millie Go Lightly featuring Lil Gnar)	2021	—		Non-album singles
"Not Your Speed" (Smokepurpp featuring Lil Gnar)	2021	—		Non-album singles
"Pick Up" (Spida4Eva featuring Lil Gnar)	2022	—		Non-album singles
"Spirits Pt.2" (Party Favor featuring Lil Gnar)	2022	—		Reset
"Merci" (Ghostluvme featuring Lil Gnar and Lancey Foux)	2022	—		Non-album single
"Wake Up" (Ghostluvme featuring Lil Gnar and Matt OX)	2023	—		Bohunk (Deluxe)
"Where Da Opps!" (Mar90s featuring Lil Gnar)	2023	—		Non-album single

==== Guest appearances ====
List of non-single guest appearances, with other performing artists
Title	Year	Other artist(s)	Album
"Transformer"	2018	Rico Nasty	Nasty
"Gnarly Boyz"	2018	Lancey Foux	Pink II
"We Good"	2018	YoursTrulyKev	Uncomfortable
"Give It Up"	2018	$tupid Young	True Story
"Inside"	2019	Night Lovell	Goodnight Lovell
"Necklace"	2019	Germ	Germ Has A Deathwish
"Orbit"	2019	Menoh Beats	Menohi
"Lethal Weapon"	2019	Frais, Germ	Cursed
"Aired Out"	2019	Kevin Celik, Bnkroll Benny, $tupid Young	The Recipe
"Leave Me Be"	2019	DatYunginG5	Misery Loves Company
"Rainy Dayz"	2019	Mar90s	In My Eyez
"19 Crimez"	2020	Robb Bank$	Tha Leak (Part 1)
"Splurgin"	2020	DJ Scheme, Shakewell	Family
"In Tha Spot"	2020	Robb Bank$	Tha Leak 2
"Stick n the Trunk"	2021	D. Savage	BPL
"Flooded Patek"	2022	UnoTheActivist	Limbus 2.5
"Righteous (Remix)"	2023	Mo Beats	Non-album remix
"Satvia"	2023	Young Cardi	Outsider
"Anti Social"	2024	Fedd the God	Where's Fedd?
"Goat"	2024	Ballout	Life Of A Glo Boy 2
"Pews & Pows"	2024	Kidd Keo	2016
"Jesus"	2024	Chief Keef	Almighty So 2
