= Dog Boy =

Dog Boy may refer to:

- Dog Boy (singer)
- Dog Boy (novel)
- Dog Boy (album), 2021 studio album by ZillaKami
- Dog-Boy, a recurring segment on Liquid Television
