= Die Bout It =

Studio album by Lil Gnar
- Released: May 20, 2022
- Recorded: 2020–2022
- Length: 48:22
- Label: Gnarcotic; Create Music Group
- Producer: Bankroll Got It; Basobeats; Bloublood; BounceGoHard; Clint Ford; Diego Ave; Diormade; DJ Scheme; Evertime; GYW Eli; Higherside; Jordan Fox; KP Beatz; Losaddos; LostKidSamy; Nuri; Skipass; Skreer; ssort; Synthetic; Technology Beats; Thxfortheslapali

Lil Gnar chronology
| Big Bad Gnar Shit 2 (2020) | Die Bout It (2022) | In My Glory (2025) |

Singles from Die Bout It
- 1. "Diamond Choker" Released: October 16, 2020; 2. "Missiles" Released: February 12, 2021; 3. "Not the Same" Released: April 2, 2021; 4. "New Bugatti" Released: May 14, 2021; 5. "No Regular" Released: July 16, 2021; 6. "No Switches" Released: April 29, 2022; 7. "My Bruddas" Released: May 6, 2022

Die Bout It (stylized in all caps) is the debut studio album by American rapper Lil Gnar. It was released on May 20, 2022, by Create Music Group and Gnar's own record company Gnarcotic Records. The album features guest appearances from Tory Lanez, Yung Bans, the late Lil Keed, Yak Gotti, Trippie Redd, Germ, D. Savage, Lil Uzi Vert, Ski Mask the Slump God, Chief Keef, DJ Scheme and Lil Skies.

== Singles ==
The lead single to the album was "Diamond Choker" featuring Lil Uzi Vert. The song was released on October 16, 2020. The album's second single, "Missiles" featuring Trippie Redd was released on February 12, 2021. The third single, "Not the Same" featuring frequent collaborator Lil Skies, was released April 2, 2021. The fourth single New Bugatti released May 14, 2021 and features vocals from Chief Keef and Ski Mask the Slump God with production handled by DJ Scheme. The song charted at #38 on the New Zealand Music Chart. The fifth single "No Regular", was released July 16, 2021 and is the only single to not have a feature. The sixth single "No Switches" featuring Canadian singer and rapper Tory Lanez was released April 29, 2022. The seventh and final single "My Bruddas" features Yung Bans and was released May 6, 2022.

== Critical reception ==
Professional ratings
Review scores
| Source | Rating |
|---|---|
| RapReviews | 7/10 |

RapReviews.com gave the album a 7 out of 10, noting that there were some misses but most of the songs and features were good and that the music videos were fun. Lyrical Lemonade reviewed it positively, calling it an "absolutely essential listen for all hip-hop lovers." Russian music review website The Flow called it a "motivational album" that was "perfect for working out in the gym".

== Track listing ==
Die Bout It track listing
| No. | Title | Writer(s) | Producer(s) | Length |
|---|---|---|---|---|
| 1. | "Die Bout It" | Caleb Shepard; Thxfortheslapali; BounceGoHard | Thxfortheslapali; BounceGoHard | 2:22 |
| 2. | "No Switches" (featuring Tory Lanez) | Shepard; Daystar Peterson; BounceGoHard | BounceGoHard | 2:31 |
| 3. | "My Bruddas" (featuring Yung Bans) | Shepard; Vas Coleman; Samuel Nordqvist; Kenneth Pannu; Thomas Ross | LostKidSamy; KP Beatz; ssort | 3:06 |
| 4. | "Grenade (Get Paid)" | Shepard; BounceGoHard | BounceGoHard | 2:12 |
| 5. | "No Reason" (featuring Lil Keed and Yak Gotti) | Shepard; Raqhid Render; Yak Gotti; Isaiah Blouir; Samuel Jones; Basil von Stietencron; Losaddos | Bloublood; Diormade; Basobeats; Losaddos | 3:57 |
| 6. | "Missiles" (featuring Trippie Redd) | Shepard; Michael White IV; Diego Ave; Bankroll Got It | Diego Ave; Bankroll Got It | 2:35 |
| 7. | "Black Belt" | Shepard; BounceGoHard | BounceGoHard | 2:03 |
| 8. | "Digg" (featuring Germ) | Shepard; Jerry Antoine; Diego Ave; Bankroll Got It; Joel Banks; Matthew Banks | Diego Ave; Bankroll Got It | 2:51 |
| 9. | "Moshpit" | Shepard; Skipass | Skipass | 2:04 |
| 10. | "Shoebox Money" (featuring D. Savage) | Shepard; Dylan McCord | | 3:29 |
| 11. | "Ain't It" | Shepard; BounceGoHard; Will Boyette | BounceGoHard | 2:28 |
| 12. | "Wazzup" | Shepard; Skreer; Higherside; Technology Beats; Synthetic | Skreer; Higherside; Technology Beats; Synthetic | 2:07 |
| 13. | "Diamond Choker" (featuring Lil Uzi Vert) | Shepard; Symere Woods; Bankroll Got It; Kevin Celik; Joel Banks; Taylor Banks | Bankroll Got It | 2:35 |
| 14. | "Price on His Head" | Shepard; BounceGoHard | BounceGoHard | 2:30 |
| 15. | "New Bugatti" (featuring Ski Mask the Slump God, Chief Keef and DJ Scheme) | Shepard; Stokeley Goulbourne Jr.; Keith Cozart; Gabriel Guerra; Nuri | DJ Scheme; Nuri | 3:47 |
| 16. | "No Regular" | Shepard; Evertime; Nordqvist; Pannu | Evertime; LostKidSamy; KP Beatz | 2:27 |
| 17. | "Not the Same" (featuring Lil Skies) | Shepard; Kimetrius Foose; Jordan Fox; Clint Ford; GYW Eli | Jordan Fox; Clint Ford; GYW Eli | 3:14 |
| 18. | "Dem Days" | Shepard; Technology Beats | Technology Beats | 1:57 |
| Total length: | | | | 48:22 |
