= In My Glory =

Studio album by Lil Gnar
- Released: November 14, 2025
- Genres: Hip-hop; trap
- Length: 43:05
- Labels: 43B; Gnarcotic
- Producers: 99LA; Akachi; Arjun Singha; Ayopless; Banrisk; Bleed; Chief Keef; CosMIC; Eza; Fecony; Gfelds; Legacy; Mxn3y; Mason Wu; Micro; Pink Grillz; S-V4GE; Shawn Ferrari; Tristan Callaway

Lil Gnar chronology
Die Bout It (2022)	In My Glory (2025)

Singles from In My Glory
- 1. "Almighty Gnar" Released: August 26, 2022; 2. "Pleads" Released: October 30, 2024; 3. "Beam" Released: October 9, 2025; 4. "Prayer" Released: November 14, 2025

In My Glory (stylized in all caps) is the second studio album by American rapper Lil Gnar. It was released on November 14, 2025, by 43B and Gnar's own record company Gnarcotic Records. The album features guest appearances by 2 Chainz, Chief Keef, Karrahbooo, Nardo Wick, Ski Mask the Slump God, UnoTheActivist, VonOff1700, and Young Nudy.

== Background ==
Lil Gnar was signed to longtime collaborator Chief Keef's record label, 43B (an initialism for "Forget Everybody"), on June 6, 2022, becoming the first artist to be signed to the label. In My Glory serves as Gnar's first major release under the label, and serves as the follow-up to his debut album, Die Bout It, released three years prior.

Lil Gnar revealed the album's release date and cover art on November 6, 2025. The album was executive produced by Chief Keef.

== Singles ==
The album's lead single, "Pleads" featuring Chief Keef and Nardo Wick, was released on October 30, 2024. The song's official music video was released on December 18, 2024, to Lil Gnar's YouTube channel.

The second single, "Beam" featuring Ski Mask the Slump God, was released on October 10, 2025, along with an official visualizer.

From December 8 to 10, Lil Gnar released three visualizers: "Prayer" featuring 2 Chainz, "Welcome 2 da Game" featuring Chief Keef, and "Big Flame" featuring Young Nudy.

On January 8, 2026, an official visualizer for "Hell Yeah" was released to YouTube.

== Track listing ==
In My Glory track listing
No.	Title	Writer(s)	Producer(s)	Length
1.	"Boston" (featuring VonOff1700)	Caleb Sheppard; Davon Meeks; Keith Farrelle Cozart	Chief Keef	3:34
2.	"Prayer" (featuring 2 Chainz)	Sheppard; Paul Valentin Guilhem Carod; Tauheed Epps	S-V4GE	3:08
3.	"Welcome 2 da Game" (featuring Chief Keef)	Sheppard; Cozart	Chief Keef	3:49
4.	"Beam" (featuring Ski Mask the Slump God)	Sheppard; Arjun Singha; Stokeley Goulbourne	Arjun Singha; Eza	3:01
5.	"Crack Dat"	Sheppard; Dabeev Vadim Dmitrievich; Vasilev Anton Dmitrievich	Ayopless; Legacy	1:32
6.	"Hell Yeah"	Sheppard; Etic Matheus; Mateusz Wroblewski	Bleed; CosMIC	2:23
7.	"Antidote"	Sheppard; Singha; Mouad Belqaid	Singha; Mxn3y	1:54
8.	"Big Flame" (featuring Young Nudy)	Sheppard; Singha; Harris Sameer; Quantavious Thomas	Singha; Fecony	2:52
9.	"Rocket Power" (featuring UnoTheActivist)	Sheppard; Troy Lane; Tyler Edwards	Micro	3:28
10.	"Can't Pick One"	Sheppard; Grant Feldman; Layne Kelder	99LA; Gfelds	1:59
11.	"Higher Than Y'all" (featuring Karrahbooo)	Sheppard; Karajan Schuster; Carod	S-V4GE	2:17
12.	"Staring @ da Sun"	Sheppard; Tristan Callaway; Wu Mason Saerok	Singha; Mason Wu; Tristan Callaway	3:03
13.	"Gnarcotic Boomin"	Sheppard; Cozart	Chief Keef	1:22
14.	"Pass da Lighter"	Sheppard; Cozart	Chief Keef	2:14
15.	"Almighty Gnar" (featuring Chief Keef)	Sheppard; Cozart; Damian Vinh Hien Offmanns; Ernest Day; Ethan McCallum-Williams; Hunder Addison Brown	Akachi; Pink Grillz; Shawn Ferrari; Banrisk	3:30
16.	"Pleads" (featuring Chief Keef and Nardo Wick)	Sheppard; Cozart; Horace Walls	Chief Keef	2:59
Total length:				43:05
