= Concrete Boys =

American hip hop group

- Origin: Atlanta, Georgia, United States
- Genre: Hip-hop
- Years active: 2020–present
- Labels: Concrete Rekordz, Quality Control Music
- Members: Lil Yachty; Draft Day; Camo!; Dc2Trill; Honest; Rio Amor; Karrahbooo

Concrete Boys is an American hip hop record label and collective founded by rapper Lil Yachty in 2020. The group consists of Lil Yachty, Draft Day, Camo!, Dc2Trill, Karrahbooo, Rio Amor, and Honest.

== History ==
=== 2020–2023: Formation and early development ===
Lil Yachty formed Concrete Boys in 2020. He promoted the group on the final song of his 2020 album Lil Boat 3, titled "Concrete Boys". Draft Day joined the collective in 2021. The collective's first signee, he met Yachty during high school. Karrahbooo originally worked as Yachty's assistant and intended to become an actor before starting her music career. Texas rapper Dc2Trill first collaborated with Yachty in 2020 while working on his 2021 mixtape Michigan Boy Boat. Camo! first met Yachty in 2020 on the video shoot for his song "Split/Whole Time". Karrahbooo and Camo! joined the group in 2022.

In 2023, the group marketed themselves through a series of color-coordinated photo shoots, an "On the Radar" radio freestyle, and their debut single "Mo Jams".

=== 2024-present: It’s Us Vol. 1, Fivestarcrete, and It's Us Vol. 2 ===
In March 2024, Yachty formed the record label Concrete Rekordz in partnership with Quality Control Music. The group released their debut album, It’s Us Vol. 1, on April 5, 2024. The group embarked on the "It's Us Tour" in support of the album in June 2024.

Karrahbooo split from the group in July 2024. She rejoined the group on May 26, 2026 after reconciling previous conflicts with Lil Yachty, involving stolen lyrics and false accusations.

The group collaborated with Italian fashion designer Domenico Formichetti on his May 2025 streetwear collection. Fivestarcrete, a collaborative mixtape with live streamer PlaqueBoyMax, was released on August 21, 2025. The mixtape was recorded on an 11 hour live stream by PlaqueBoyMax and the group. In August 2025, Yachty announced the group's second mixtape, It's Us Vol. 2, and that Rio Amor and Honest would be joining the collective. It's Us Vol. 2, was released on February 27, 2026, and featured Veeze and Rio Da Yung OG.

== Members ==
=== Current ===
- Lil Yachty (2020–present)
- Draft Day (2020–present)
- Dc2Trill (2020–present)
- Camo! (2022–present)
- Honest (2025–present)
- Rio Amor (2025–present)

== Discography ==
=== Mixtapes ===
- It's Us Vol. 1 (2024)
- Fivestarcrete (2025)
- It's Us Vol. 2 (2026)

=== Singles ===
- "Mo Jams" (2023)
- "Family Business" (2024)
- "My Life" (2024)
- "Love Language" (2024)
- "Fasho Dat" (2025)
- "YNGTC" (2025)
- "We're Back" (2026)
- "Millionaire" (2026)
- "Stylistics" (2026)
