= My Bloody America =

Studio album by City Morgue
- Released: September 15, 2023
- Genre: Trap metal
- Length: 30:22
- Label: Hikari-Ultra; Republic
- Producer: 3quinox; Hellshot; Hellsing; Jay-P Two Point O; Jordy; Mason Sacks; Powers Pleasant; Reapyy; Ryder Johnson; Shoki; Taz Taylor; Thraxx; Toom; Yung Germ

City Morgue chronology
City Morgue Volume 3: Bottom of the Barrel (2021)	My Bloody America (2023)

Singles from My Bloody America
- 1. "Skull & Bones 322" Released: April 28, 2023; 2. "Haha Waco" Released: August 25, 2023

My Bloody America is the fourth and final studio album by American hip hop duo City Morgue, composed of rappers ZillaKami and SosMula. It was released on September 15, 2023, by Hikari-Ultra and Republic Records.

== Background ==
The album was teased on June 22, 2022, and confirmed by ZillaKami on Instagram. There was speculation about the group disbanding, following leaks and tour announcements. SosMula confirmed that the album was completed on September 17, 2022. However, the album experienced further leaks and delays, with ZillaKami explaining the reasons behind the delays in March 2023.

Despite being set for an April release, the album experienced further delays. The lead single, "Skull & Bones 322". was released on April 28, 2023. Eventually, on August 23, 2023, a September 15 release date was confirmed via City Morgue's Instagram. The track listing was revealed, and the second single, "Haha Waco", was released, on August 25, 2023.

== Critical reception ==
Professional ratings
Review scores
Source	Rating
Sputnikmusic	2.5/5

In a mixed review, Sputnikmusic wrote: "There are flashes of that transgressive energy that permeate their usual sound and gut-punch the listener with that good ol' viciousness, but sonically [the album] occupies a space that doesn't plot a future trajectory for the outfit, or further the one they've already started traversing."

== Track listing ==
My Bloody America track listing
No.	Title	Writer(s)	Producer(s)	Length
1.	"Hell (Prelude)"	Junius Rogers; Vinicius Sosa; Jay P Gallo	Jay-P Two Point O	1:06
2.	"Skull & Bones 322"	Rogers; Sosa; Gallo; David Pointer; Iggy Börjesson	Jay-P Two Point O; Reapyy; Shoki	1:50
3.	"Sauna"	Rogers; Sosa; Gallo; Pointer; Julian Raymond; Thomas Herrick	Ice Beats; Jay-P Two Point O; Shoki; Toom	1:47
4.	"Haha Waco"	Rogers; Sosa; Gallo; Danny Lee Snodgrass, Jr.; Jeremy Schafer; Ryder Johnson	Jay-P Two Point O; Ryder Johnson; Taz Taylor; Yung Germ	1:46
5.	"Boy in the Box"	Rogers; Sosa; Gallo; Schafer	Jay-P Two Point O; Yung Germ	2:09
6.	"Welcome to the Hatman"	Rogers; Sosa; Gallo; Pointer; Dylan Blaisdell; Nathen Owens	3quinox; Hellshot; Jay-P Two Point O; Shoki	1:50
7.	"Funny"	Rogers; Sosa; Gallo; Mason Sacks; Powers Pleasant	Jay-P Two Point O; Mason Sacks; Powers Pleasant	3:35
8.	"Counting Casualties (Interlude)"	Rogers; Sosa; Gallo	Jay-P Two Point O	1:06
9.	"Pros"	Rogers; Sosa; Gallo; Schafer	Jay-P Two Point O; Yung Germ	1:53
10.	"Vacant"	Rogers; Sosa; Gallo; Pointer; Ian Zoric; Jordan Johnson	Hellsing; Jay-P Two Point O; Jordy; Shoki	2:39
11.	"Wicked"	Rogers; Sosa; Gallo; Pointer; Zoric	Hellsing; Jay-P Two Point O; Shoki	2:35
12.	"Locksmith"	Rogers; Sosa; Gallo; Schafer	Jay-P Two Point O; Yung Germ	2:20
13.	"Stupid Games"	Rogers; Sosa; Gallo; Bouabdallah Sami Nehari	Jay-P Two Point O; Thraxx	1:50
14.	"Russian"	Rogers; Sosa; Gallo; Schafer	Jay-P Two Point O; Yung Germ	1:22
15.	"Tide (Epilogue)"	Rogers; Sosa; Gallo	Jay-P Two Point O	2:34
Total length:				30:22

Notes:

- "Haha Waco" and "Funny" are stylized in all caps.
- "Welcome to the Hatman" is stylized as "Welcome to the HATMAN".
