= City Morgue Vol 2: As Good as Dead =

Studio album by City Morgue
- Released: December 13, 2019
- Recorded: 2019
- Genre: Trap metal
- Length: 34:48
- Labels: Hikari-Ultra; Republic
- Producers: Amertume; Dominic Jesse Maestas; Germ; Mike Dean; Plurbs; Ryder Thornton Johnson; Shoki; Thraxx

City Morgue chronology
City Morgue Vol 1: Hell or High Water (2018)	City Morgue Vol 2: As Good as Dead (2019)	Toxic Boogaloo (2020)

Singles from City Morgue Vol 2: As Good as Dead
- 1. "The Balloons" Released: December 6, 2019

City Morgue Vol 2: As Good as Dead is the second studio album by American hip hop duo City Morgue, composed of rappers ZillaKami and SosMula. It was released on December 13, 2019, by Hikari-Ultra and Republic Records. It features guest appearances from Denzel Curry and IDK. Production was handled by Amertume, Dominic Jesse Maestas, Germ, Mike Dean, Plurbs, Ryder Thornton Johnson, Shoki, and Thraxx.

The album peaked at number 16 on the US Billboard 200 and number 7 on the Top R&B/Hip-Hop Albums chart.

== Track listing ==
City Morgue Vol 2: As Good as Dead track listing
No.	Title	Writer(s)	Producer(s)	Length
1.	"Neck Brace"	Junius Rogers; Vinicius Sosa	Thraxx	2:15
2.	"Inferior"	Rogers; Sosa	Germ; Mike Dean	2:30
3.	"Draino" (featuring Denzel Curry)	Rogers; Sosa; Denzel Curry	Mike Dean	3:23
4.	"The Give Up"	Rogers; Sosa	Germ; Mike Dean	2:29
5.	"Thresh"	Rogers; Sosa	Germ	1:57
6.	"Splinter"	Rogers; Sosa	Germ	2:16
7.	"Minimizya" (featuring IDK)	Rogers; Jason Mills	Germ	1:50
8.	"The Balloons"	Rogers; Sosa	Germ	1:51
9.	"Soul Burn" (performed by SosMula)	Sosa; Joseph Albert Ramon; Simon Manivel	Amertume; Plurbs	1:29
10.	"16 Toes" (performed by ZillaKami)	Rogers; Sosa	Thraxx	1:44
11.	"Woah" (performed by SosMula)	Sosa	Germ; Ryder Thornton Johnson; Shoki	1:31
12.	"Dirtnap"	Rogers; Sosa	Germ; Mike Dean	1:42
13.	"C4"	Rogers; Sosa	Germ; Johnson	2:12
14.	"Babywipes"	Rogers; Sosa	Germ	1:24
15.	"Mouthguard"	Rogers; Sosa	Germ	1:57
16.	"Screaming at the Rain"	Rogers; Sosa	Dominic Jesse Maestas	1:57
17.	"Peeling Scabs"	Rogers; Sosa	Germ	2:21
Total length:				34:48

Deluxe edition
No.	Title	Writer(s)	Producer(s)	Length
18.	"The Fall Before The Give Up" (featuring Clever)	Clever; SosMula; Rogers	Mike Dean; Germ	2:28
19.	"Acab" (featuring Nascar Aloe)	Germ; nascar_aloe; Rogers	Germ	2:01
20.	"V12" (performed by SosMula)	61st Street; SosMula	61st Street	1:50
21.	"Cyka"	Rogers; SosMula	Ryder Johnson	2:06
Total length:				43:14

Notes:

- All tracks are stylized in all caps.
- Deluxe edition was released in 2020.

== Charts ==
Chart performance for City Morgue Vol 2: As Good as Dead
Chart (2019–2020)	Peak position
US Billboard 200	16
Top R&B/Hip-Hop Albums	7
