= Oprah's Bank Account =

2020 single by Lil Yachty and DaBaby featuring Drake

Single by Lil Yachty and DaBaby featuring Drake

from the album Lil Boat 3
- Released: March 9, 2020
- Genre: Hip hop; trap
- Length: 3:26
- Label: Quality Control
- Songwriters: Miles McCollum; Jonathan Kirk; Aubrey Graham; Earl Bynum
- Producer: Earl on the Beat

Lil Yachty singles chronology
"Hightop Shoes" (2020)	"Oprah's Bank Account" (2020)	"Split/Whole Time" (2020)

DaBaby singles chronology
"Fucked Up" (2020)	"Oprah's Bank Account" (2020)	"S.O.E" (2020)

Drake singles chronology
"Life Is Good" (2020)	"Oprah's Bank Account" (2020)	"Toosie Slide" (2020)

Music video
- "Oprah's Bank Account" on YouTube

"Oprah's Bank Account" is a song by American rappers Lil Yachty and DaBaby featuring Canadian rapper Drake. Produced by Earl on the Beat, it was released by Quality Control on March 9, 2020 alongside a comedic video, where Lil Yachty portrays talk-show host Oprah Winfrey. Yachty originally wanted fellow American singer and rapper Lizzo to appear on the song, but, according to him, she never responded to him.

When the song debuted at number 89 on the Billboard Hot 100, Drake broke the Glee Cast's record for most Hot 100 chart entries.

== Background and release ==
The song was released on the four year anniversary of Lil Yachty's debut mixtape, Lil Boat, as well as the second anniversary of his second studio album, Lil Boat 2. Earlier in January 2020, Yachty had made a cameo appearance in the music video for Future hit single "Life Is Good", featuring Drake. He was an assistant of Drake being the worker of an off-brand Apple Store in the video. Although "Oprah's Bank Account" is an "organic" collaboration, the rapper said he did not initially plan to have Drake or DaBaby on it. Instead, Yachty originally wanted Lizzo on the song. However, according to him, Lizzo never responded to him. Drake decided to feature on the song after hearing a snippet of it on Yachty's personal Instagram account. DaBaby's verse was added a few days after Yachty had made the song and DaBaby expressed interest in being on the song after he heard Yachty play it while they were in the studio together. Lil Yachty said his purpose for the song was "to be fun and be a vibe".

== Composition and lyrics ==
The song was produced by Earl on the Beat, whose production, according to Stereogum's Chris DeVille "makes phenomenal use of arpeggios". DeVille also noted the three artists' varying contributions to the song, writing, "DaBaby contributes a DaBaby verse", Lil Yachty "croons a mush-mouthed chorus": "Diamond in the rough, you look as good as Oprah's bank account/ I just wanna take you out/ Fuck you in your mama's house", while in his verse, Drake "leans into the melodious sing-song that has long been his calling card". Drake also references his kiss with Madonna during his 2015 Coachella performance, rapping "Back home I know Presi, I'm Obama / I condone the drama / I tongued down Madonna".

== Music video ==
The music video premiered alongside the song's release, on March 9, 2020. The 9-minute video, directed by Director X, was filmed in Toronto and Atlanta.

=== Background and concept ===
In the video, Lil Yachty portrays "Boprah", a character inspired by media mogul Oprah Winfrey. Yachty wears a wig, dress, and heels in the video. The video itself is a recreation and parody of an old episode of The Oprah Winfrey Show, with Yachty "interviewing" both DaBaby and Drake on the "Boprah Show". Jordan Darville of The Fader summed up that the video "succeeds" because each artist manages to make jokes at their own expense: "Drake reveals his LSC (light-skinned capability), DaBaby skewers his notorious tendency to use the same flow over and over, ('make every damn song like an ongoing song' [...] 'You never have to make another song again') while Yachty-as-Boprah endures Drake's skewering of mumble-rap, the genre Yachty pioneered".

=== Controversy ===
Some people accused Lil Yachty of being sexist for wearing a dress, while others resulted with homophobic remarks to suggest Lil Yachty was homosexual. Others said that Lil Yachty only dressed as a woman to "gain recognition" because he "fell off". In response, Lil Yachty said "It's just supposed to be entertaining... it ain't even that deep."

== Credits and personnel ==
Credits adapted from Tidal.

- Lil Yachty – vocals, songwriting
- DaBaby – vocals, songwriting
- Drake – vocals, songwriting
- Gentuar Memishi – recording
- Thomas "Tillie" Mann – mixing
- Princeton "Perfect Harmony" Terry – assistant mixing
- Colin Leonard – mastering

== Charts ==
Chart performance of "Oprah's Bank Account"
Chart (2020)	Peak position
Australia (ARIA)	93
Canada Hot 100 (Billboard)	38
New Zealand Hot Singles (RMNZ)	3
Switzerland (Schweizer Hitparade)	88
UK Singles (Official Charts)	54
US Billboard Hot 100	55
US Rhythmic Airplay (Billboard)	27
US Rolling Stone Top 100	34

== Certifications ==
Certifications for "Oprah's Bank Account"
Region	Certification	Certified units/sales
Australia (ARIA)	Gold	35,000^{‡}
Brazil (Pro-Música Brasil)	Gold	20,000^{‡}
New Zealand (RMNZ)	Gold	15,000^{‡}
United States (RIAA)	Platinum	1,000,000^{‡}
^{‡} Sales+streaming figures based on certification alone.
