= Pebblebrook High School =

Public high school in Mableton, Georgia, United States

Location
- 991 Old Alabama Road South; Mableton, Georgia 30126; United States; 33°48′22″N 84°34′55″W

Information
- Type: Public, performance arts
- Motto: "We are the Brook"
- Established: 1963
- School district: Cobb County School District
- Principal: Dana C. Giles
- Teaching staff: 152.50 (FTE)
- Grades: 9–12
- Enrollment: 2,574 (2023-2024)
- Student to teacher ratio: 16.88
- Campus: Suburban (Metro Atlanta)
- Colors: Blue, white, and red
- Mascot: Falcon
- Rival: South Cobb High School
- Newspaper: BrookSpeak
- Website: www.cobbk12.org/pebblebrook/

Pebblebrook High School is a high school in the Cobb County School District in Mableton, Georgia, United States. The school opened in 1963, serving grades 9-12. Pebblebrook houses the Cobb County Center for Excellence in the Performing Arts, the first magnet program offered within the Cobb County School District.

== History ==
Pebblebrook has had two campuses in its history. The first was at the (formerly) Lindley Middle School 6th Grade Academy (Now Betty Gray Middle School) building on Pebblebrook Circle, and its current location.

The City of Mableton incorporated in November 2022, and Pebblebrook High became a part of the city limits.

== Feeder schools ==
Elementary schools:

- Bryant Intermediate
- Clay Harmony Leland Elementary
- Riverside Elementary
- City View Elementary

Middle schools:

- Lindley Middle
- Garrett Middle
- Betty Gray Middle

== Cobb County Center for Excellence in the Performing Arts ==
The Cobb County Center for Excellence in the Performing Arts (CCCEPA) is a coeducational public magnet program housed on the campus of Pebblebrook High School. CCCEPA offers rigorous training in five major performing arts fields, vocal music, drama, dance, technical theatre, and musical theatre. Interested students are offered one of four auditions throughout the school year.

== Sports ==
- Baseball
- Boys' basketball
- Girls' basketball
- Cheerleading
- Cross country
- Drill team
- Football
- Boys' golf
- Girls' golf
- Raider Team
- Boys' soccer
- Girls' soccer
- Fastpitch softball
- Boys' tennis
- Girls' tennis
- Boys' track
- Girls' track
- Volleyball
- Wrestling
- Lacrosse

== Notable alumni ==
- Ken Carson – American rapper (born 2000)
- Tay Glover-Wright – American gridiron football player (born 1992)
- Jared Harper – American basketball player (born 1997)
- Mark "Slick" Johnson – American professional wrestling referee
- Krys Marshall – American actress (born 1988 or 1989)
- Trhae Mitchell – American basketball player and rapper (born 1997)
- Derek Ogbeide – Nigerian-Canadian basketball player (born 1997)
- Dwight Phillips Jr. – American football player (born 2005)
- Collin Sexton – American basketball player (born 1999)
- Giff Smith – American football coach (born 1968)
- Becca Tobin – American actress (born 1986)
- Xavier Woods – American professional wrestler (born 1986)
- Carlos Valdes – Colombian-American actor and singer (born 1989)
- Lil Yachty – American rapper (born 1997)
