= Trhae Mitchell =

American basketball player and rapper (born 1997)

No. 66 – Stockton Kings
- Position: Shooting guard
- League: NBA G League

Personal information
- Born: August 19, 1997 (age 29) Mableton, Georgia, U.S.
- Listed height: 6 ft 6 in (1.98 m)
- Listed weight: 195 lb (88 kg)

Career information
- High school: Pebblebrook (Mableton, Georgia)
- College: South Alabama (2016–2020)
- NBA draft: 2020: undrafted
- Playing career: 2020–present

Career history
- 2020–2024: Rio Grande Valley Vipers
- 2024: Calgary Surge
- 2024–2026: Birmingham Squadron
- 2026–present: Stockton Kings

Career highlights
- NBA G League champion (2022); NBA G League All-Defensive Team (2024); 2× Third-team All-Sun Belt (2019, 2020)
- Stats at NBA.com
- Stats at Basketball Reference

Trhae Maurice Mitchell (born August 19, 1997) is an American professional basketball player for the Stockton Kings of the NBA G League and rapper, known professionally as Honest. He played college basketball for the South Alabama Jaguars.

== High school career ==
Mitchell attended Pebblebrook High School where he was a three-time all-region performer: second team as a sophomore and as a senior and first team as a junior. He also received twice all-county recognition, collecting second-team plaudits in his final two years. During his career, he scored 1,000 points and earned an honorable mention on all-state teams as a junior and third-team as a senior (third team) seasons, the latter after averaging 15 points and seven rebounds per game. As a junior, he led the Falcons to a state semifinal appearance and as a senior, to a state runner-up finish.

== College career ==
Mitchell played college basketball for South Alabama where he recorded 1,127 points, 704 rebounds, 310 assists, 185 blocks and 110 steals in 125 appearances for the Jags. He also was third in school history with 185 career blocks and sixth with 704 rebounds. He also was the only player in the program's history to lead the team in rebounds, assists, steals and blocks in the same season, and second to have 200 rebounds and 100 assists in one year.

== Professional career ==
=== Rio Grande Valley Vipers (2021–2024) ===
After going undrafted in the 2020 NBA draft, Mitchell signed with the Rio Grande Valley Vipers of the NBA G League As a rookie, he played 11 games and averaged 1.3 points, 1.4 rebounds and 0.7 assists in 8.7 minutes per game.

On October 25, 2021, Mitchell re-signed with the Vipers, appearing this time in 28 games and averaging 9.8 points, 7.4 rebounds, 2.8 assists, 1.4 steals and 1.4 blocks while shooting over 50 percent from the floor, helping the Vipers win a championship.

=== Calgary Surge (2024) ===
On June 8, 2024, Mitchell signed with the Calgary Surge of the Canadian Elite Basketball League.

=== Birmingham Squadron (2024–2026) ===
On October 14, 2024, Mitchell signed with the New Orleans Pelicans, but was waived two days later. On October 28, he joined the Birmingham Squadron.

== Personal life ==
He is the son of Cornelius Mitchell and Donise Boston and has two siblings, an older sister and a younger brother, while also being related to rapper Lil Yachty. He majored in leisure studies. Outside of basketball, Mitchell is a rapper known under the name Honest or Honest Mudman. He is also signed to Concrete Boys, which is Yachty’s record label.
