= D. Savage =

American rapper (born 1998)

- Also known as: D. Savage 3900, D. Phoenix, D. Savage 2700
- Born: Dylan McCord; July 16, 1998 (age 27); Queens, New York, New York, U.S.
- Origin: Los Angeles, California, U.S.
- Genres: Hip hop; Trap; Plugg
- Occupations: Rapper; songwriter; record producer
- Years active: 2016-present
- Labels: Cutthroat; Victor Victor; Capitol; Virgin; Republic (former)

Dylan McCord (born July 18, 1998), known professionally as D. Savage (formerly known as D. Savage 3900), is an American rapper and songwriter from Los Angeles, California.

== Career ==
Born in Queens to Belizean parents. In 2016, he became notorious in the SoundCloud scene with his track "30 Round Clip". In June 2017, he released his single "Emotionless". In February 2018, he released his single "Kame In" alongside a music video. In August 2018, he appeared on American record producer Ron-Ron's track "Pull Up". In October 2018, he released his mixtape D Phoenix with appearances from Lil Yachty, Ty Dolla $ign and Yung Bans. In December 2019, he released his single "Nobody's Safe" alongside a music video. In November 2021, he released his album BPL with appearances from Trippie Redd, Lil Gnar, Matt Ox, K Suave and Tony Shhnow. In May 2022, he featured on Flash Gottii's song "Pull Up" and its accompanying music video.

== Discography ==
=== Albums ===
Title	Album details
D. Phoenix	Released: October 12, 2018; Label: Victor Victor, Capitol; Format: Digital download, streaming
Trust No One	Released: July 26, 2019; Label: Victor Victor, Capitol; Format: Digital download, streaming
BPL	Released: November 12, 2021; Label: Self-released; Format: Digital download, streaming
Mafia Musik	Released: February 17, 2023; Label: Self-released; Format: Digital download, streaming
We Love D. Savage	Released: February 14, 2025; Label: Self-released; Format: Digital download, streaming

=== Singles ===
List of singles as lead artist, showing year released and album name
Title	Year	Album
"Joker"	2016	Non-album singles
"Lay Low" (featuring Joey Fatts)	2016	Non-album singles
"Fuk Wit Me"	2017	Non-album singles
"Emotionless"	2017	Non-album singles
"30 Round Clip"	2017	Non-album singles
"I Know"	2017	Non-album singles
"Kame In"	2018	D. Phoenix
"No Smoke" (featuring Lil Yachty)	2018	D. Phoenix
"Opera"	2018	D. Phoenix
"No Make Up"	2019	Non-album single
"WYTD"	2019	Trust No One
"Racks On Me"	2019	Trust No One
"How Does It Feel"	2020	Non-album single
"IDC" (featuring Trippie Redd)	2021	BPL
"Lock'd In"	2021	BPL
"Don't U Change"	2021	BPL
"2022 Freestyle"	2022	Non-album singles
"Baby Buss It"	2022	Non-album singles
"Joker, Pt. 2"	2022	Mafia Musik
"Klosure"	2023	Mafia Musik
"All Kap"	2023	Mafia Musik
"Kome On"	2023	Mafia Musik
"Rich & Player”	2023	Non-album single
"Lost & Found”	2023	Non-album single
"Breathe”	2023	Non-album single
"Empire”	2024	Non-album single
"Mob”	2024	Non-album single
"All Day”	2024	Non-album single
"Sin4TheWin”	2024	WE LOVE D. SAVAGE
"Fitness”	2024	Non-album single
"Until I Fall”	2024	WE LOVE D. SAVAGE
"Fr!ed”	2024	WE LOVE D. SAVAGE
"HIT UP”	2025	Non-album single
"inthej”	2025	WE LOVE D. SAVAGE
"Mind”	2025	Non-album single
"WSSUP”	2025	Non-album single
"Batmobile”
"w my mano”
