= Gnar Lif3 =

Mixtape by Lil Gnar
- Released: September 27, 2018
- Recorded: 2017-2018
- Genres: Hip hop; trap; rap; trap metal; emo rap
- Length: 23:54
- Label: TenThousand Projects
- Producers: 1Mind; Azul; E-Trou; E.Dan; JordanXL; Josh Petruccio; JRHITMAKER; KC Supreme; Killstation; Nick Mira; Phararoh Vice; Riff Grimez; SS.Kev; Taz Taylor; TM88; Travis Barker

Lil Gnar chronology
Big Bad Gnar Shit (2018)	Gnar Lif3 (2018)	Fire Hazard (2019)

Singles from Gnar Lif3
- 1. "Drop Top Benz" Released: May 11, 2018; 2. "Ice Out" Released: September 5, 2018; 3. "Gnarcotic Gang" Released: September 10, 2018

Gnar Lif3 (stylized as GNAR Lif3) is the debut mixtape by American rapper Lil Gnar. It was released on September 27, 2018, by TenThousand Projects. The album features guest appearances from Lil Skies, Travis Barker, IDK and ZillaKami.

== Singles ==
The lead single off the mixtape, "Drop Top Benz" featuring Lil Skies, was released May 11, 2018. The second single was "Ice Out", released September 5, 2018. The third and final single, "Gnarcotic Gang", was released September 10, 2018.

== Track listing ==
No.	Title	Writer(s)	Producer(s)	Length
1.	"Ice Out"	Caleb Shepard; Henry Nichols; Jabrielle Brooks; Danny Snodgrass Jr.	Phararoh Vice; JRHITMAKER; Taz Taylor	1:43
2.	"Grave" (featuring Lil Skies)	Shepard; Kimetrius Foose; 1Mind; JordanXL; E.Dan; Bryan Simmons; Mike Lohmeier; Andrew Hogan; Mac Sutphin; Bobby Wooten III	1Mind; JordanXL; E.Dan; TM88	2:41
3.	"Mothership"	Shepard; Josh Petruccio; Snodgrass Jr.	Josh Petruccio; Taz Taylor	2:48
4.	"Batmane"	Shepard; Kevin Hurlic	SS.Kev	2:20
5.	"455"	Shepard; Nicholas Mira; Petruccio; Snodgrass Jr.	Nick Mira; Josh Petruccio; Taz Taylor	1:54
6.	"Drop Top Benz" (featuring Lil Skies)	Shepard; Foose; Elias Latrou; Kim Candilora; Snodgrass Jr.	E-Trou; KC Supreme; Taz Taylor	2:15
7.	"Laker Guap"	Shepard; Azul	Azul	1:56
8.	"Sick In The Head" (featuring Travis Barker)	Shepard; Travis Barker	Travis Barker	1:50
9.	"Gnarcotic Gang"	Shepard; Nolan Santana	Killstation	2:33
10.	"I Don't Sell Dope" (featuring IDK)	Shepard; Jason Mills; Azul	Azul	1:41
11.	"Man Down" (featuring ZillaKami)	Shepard; Junius Rogers; Riff Grimez	Riff Grimez	2:09
Total length:				23:54

Notes:

- "Grave" is stylised in uppercase
- "Sick In The Head" is stylized as "SiCK IN THE HEAD"

== Charts ==
Chart performance for Untamed
Chart (2021)	Peak position
US Heatseekers Album	16
