= Misunderstood (album) =

Studio album by Yung Bans
- Released: July 24, 2019
- Recorded: 2018–19
- Genre: Hip hop; trap
- Length: 56:18
- Label: Foundation Media

Yung Bans chronology
Yung Bans Vol. 5 (2018)	Misunderstood (2019)	Yung Bans Vol. 6 (2023)

Singles from Misunderstood
- 1. "Going Wild" Released: July 24, 2019

Misunderstood is the debut studio album by American rapper Yung Bans. The album was released on July 24, 2019 through Foundation Media. The album features guest appearances by YNW Melly, XXXTentacion, Gunna, Young Thug, Future, among others.

== Background ==
On July 5, 2019, Yung Bans announced the album along with its album art and tracklist. Polyphia guitarist Tim Henson is featured playing guitar on the album.

== Singles ==
The album's lead single, "Going Wild", was released on July 24, 2019. The music video for the song was released the same day.

== Track listing ==
Credits adapted from Tidal and Spotify.

No.	Title	Writer(s)	Producer(s)	Length
1.	"Going Wild" (featuring Future)	Vas Coleman; Nayvadius Wilburn; Ebony Oshunrinde; Daniel Perez	WondaGurl; Bugz Ronin; Ian Jeffrey Thomas	3:14
2.	"SOS"	Coleman; Darrell Jackson; Wesley Glass	Chopsquad DJ; Wheezy	1:54
3.	"Prada Zombie"	Coleman; Nick Mira	Mira	2:03
4.	"100 Shells" (featuring YNW Melly)	Coleman; Jamell Demons; Ryan Vojtesak	Charlie Handsome; Smoko Ono	3:00
5.	"Blah Blah Blah"	Coleman; Mira	Mira	2:53
6.	"Shawty / In Love With All My Bitches"	Coleman; David Biral; Denzel Baptiste; Oshunrinde	Mira; Take a Daytrip; WondaGurl	4:24
7.	"Touch the Stars" (featuring Lil Tjay)	Coleman; Tione Merritt; Kenneth Blume III	Kenny Beats	3:09
8.	"Going Bezurk"	Coleman	Bing	3:13
9.	"XXXTentacion Interlude"	Coleman; Jahseh Onfroy	Yung Bans	0:50
10.	"Ready Set Go" (featuring 03 Greedo and XXXTentacion)	Coleman; Jason Jackson; Onfroy; Devante Wilkes; Oshunrinde	Goose With Another One; WondaGurl	3:01
11.	"How Da Game Go"	Coleman; Mira	Mira	2:55
12.	"Hold Up" (featuring Gunna and Young Thug)	Coleman; Sergio Kitchens; Jeffery Williams; Glass	Wheezy	3:10
13.	"I Don't Even Crip"	Coleman; Biral; Baptiste	Take a Daytrip	2:39
14.	"Red Dead" (featuring Slim Santana)	Coleman; Wilburn; Slim Santana; Mira	Mira; Take a Daytrip	3:16
15.	"Yeaaa!" (featuring Future)	Coleman; Wilburn; D. Jackson; Oshunrinde	Chopsquad DJ; WondaGurl	3:34
16.	"Gang"	Coleman; Bryan Simmons	TM88; E. Dan^{[a]}	2:13
17.	"Enemies" (featuring Lil Durk and Nav)	Coleman; Durk Banks; Navraj Goraya; Shane Lindstrom	Murda Beatz; Bobby Raps^{[a]}	3:46
18.	"Too Many Times"	Coleman; Jamaal Henry	Maaly Raw; Smoko Ono; Andrew Beckner	4:57
19.	"Broken Pieces"	Coleman; Perez	Bugz Ronin; Andrew Beckner	2:07
Total length:				56:18

Notes

- ^{^[a]} signifies an uncredited co-producer
