= City Morgue =

American hip-hop duo

- Origin: New York City, New York, U.S.
- Genres: Punk rap; trap metal; hardcore hip hop
- Years active: 2017–2024
- Labels: Hikari-Ultra; Republic
- Past members: ZillaKami; SosMula
- Website: citymorgueofficial.com

City Morgue was an American hip hop duo from New York City, which consisted of rappers ZillaKami (Junius Rogers) and SosMula (Vinicius Sosa). The duo was active from the year 2017 to the year 2024 and have released four studio albums, along with numerous singles. The duo split up in 2024 after commercial decline of their music, record label disputes and the allegations against one of its members, ZillaKami.

== History ==
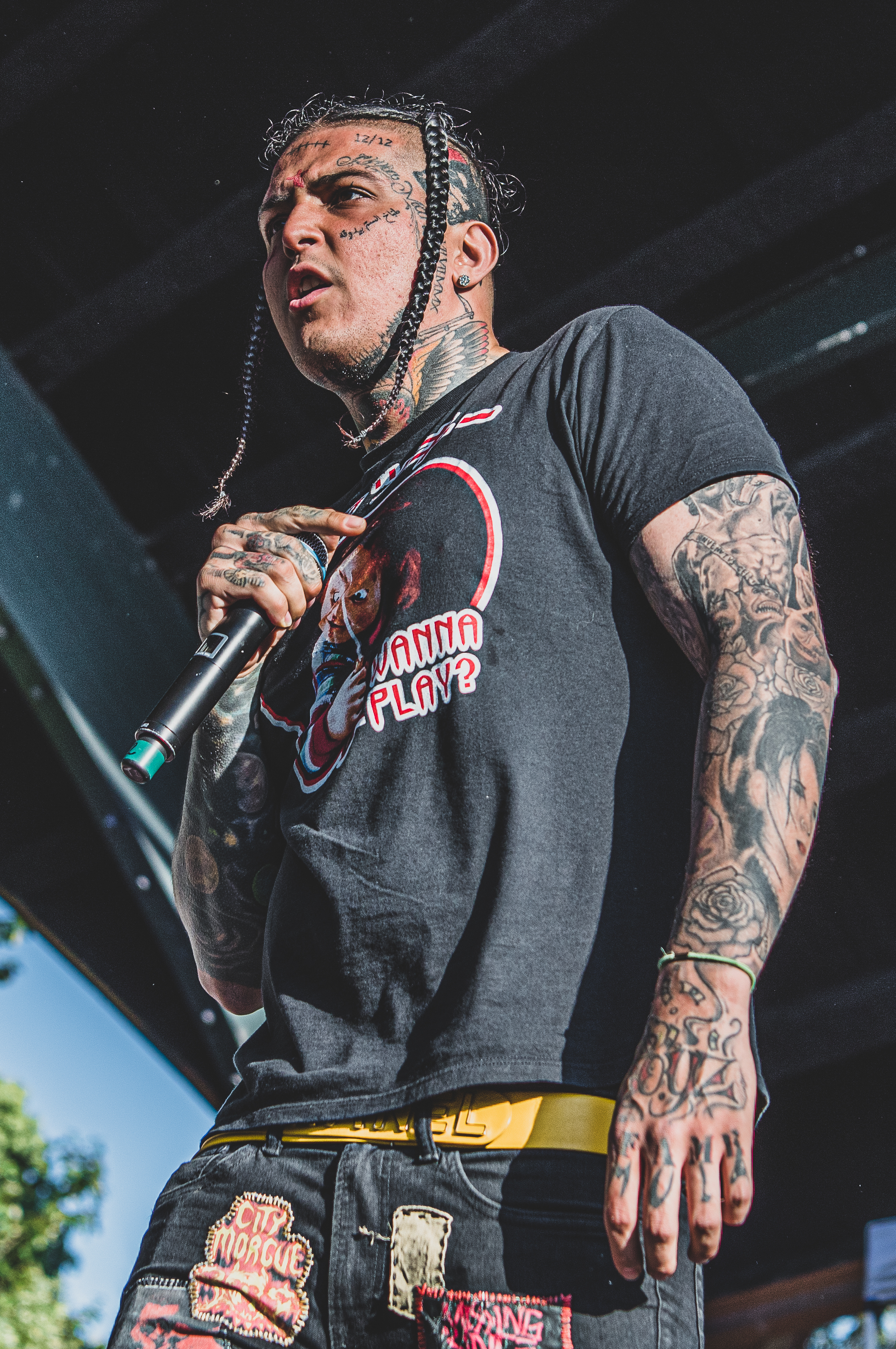
SosMula in 2020

Prior to the formation of City Morgue in 2017, Junius Rogers, professionally known as ZillaKami, worked extensively with 6ix9ine in the underground hip-hop scene in New York City and allegedly ghostwrote many of 6ix9ine's early songs. His other collaborator was his older half-brother Peter Rogers, known professionally as Righteous P, the CEO of music label Hikari-Ultra. The brothers had a falling out with 6ix9ine after he allegedly refused to pay back money owed and ripped instrumentals from the group. In response, ZillaKami and other detractors publicly circulated information about 6ix9ine's child sexual performance charge.

ZillaKami had met Vinicius Sosa, known professionally as SosMula, on his first day out of jail, and started creating songs some time after meeting with record producer Bouabdallah Sami Nehari, known professionally as Thraxx. Together, the trio had made many projects since then, including numerous singles, some of which being "Sk8 Head", "Shinners13", "33rd Blakk Glass", and an album City Morgue Vol 1: Hell or High Water.

ZillaKami was also featured on Denzel Curry's 2018 single "Vengeance", and in turn, Curry had City Morgue on the Ta13oo tour. On November 19, 2018, City Morgue sold out their first headline show in New York City at Saint Vitus Bar located in Brooklyn.

On December 13, 2019, City Morgue released their second album City Morgue Vol 2: As Good as Dead. On the same day, City Morgue was featured on the track "Wardogz" by GRAVEDGR.

On July 23, 2020, City Morgue released a video for "Hurtworld '99", which acted as the lead single for their Toxic Boogaloo mixtape that was released on July 31, 2020. They also released videos for "The Electric Experience" and "Yakuza" on August 5 and August 12, 2020, respectively.

On September 28, 2021, City Morgue released the single "What's My Name". It acted as the lead single to their third studio album City Morgue Vol 3: Bottom of the Barrel.

On June 24, 2022, ZillaKami announced that the next summer tour would most likely be their last City Morgue tour. SosMula later announced that the next album in City Morgue's discography would be their last. Despite the announcement, this tour was not their last. On May 19th, 2023, hip-hop duo $uicideboy$ announced their 4th annual Grey Day tour to start from August 25, 2023, to October 30, 2023, and City Morgue were announced to be a part of the lineup alongside artists Sematary, Ramirez, Ghostemane, and Freddie Dredd.

On April 28, 2023, City Morgue released the single "Skull & Bones 322". It was their first single for their final studio album My Bloody America. On August 25, 2023, the duo released the second single "HAHA WACO". On September 15, 2023, they released "My Bloody America".

== Musical style ==
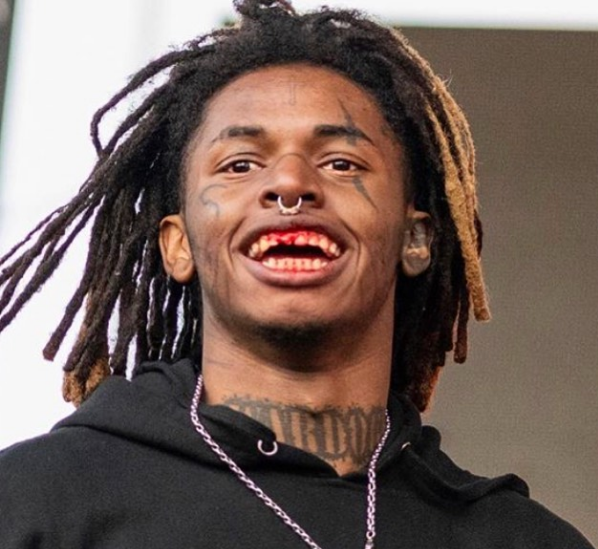
ZillaKami in 2019

The duo's music is categorised as punk rap, trap metal, hardcore rap, nu metal, rap metal, rap rock, and alternative hip hop, often containing elements of extreme metal and shock rock. During an interview, they stated that their music "is just a modern take on nu-metal. It's more trap, with more 808s and high-hats". Kerrang! writer Gary Suarez said that their "unflinchingly hostile blend of trap and metal... careens towards misanthropy and nihilism to an alarming extent". In an article for Revolver, their music was described as "full of queasy synth, destabilizing bass and disconcerting bars". Cat Jones from Kerrang! described their music as "ZillaKami's raspy vocals are punctuated by SosMula's higher register over metal samples in a way that feels terrifying and entrancing at the same time".

Tom Breihan of Stereogum said their music "take[s] all the face-tatted fuck-shit-up tendencies of the young SoundCloud rap scene, and they blow that stuff way the hell out of proportion, scream-rapping about drugs and murder with rabid ferocity". Respect magazine said they "spin gothic hood tales, harking back to timeless East Coast hip-hop—yet sharpened by their signature dark metallic edge". They cite influences such as Behemoth, Slipknot, Title Fight, DMX, Radiohead, Onyx, Eminem and Tyler, the Creator.

== Discography ==
=== Studio albums ===
List of studio albums, with selected chart positions
Title	Details	Peak chart positions		
Title	Details	US	US R&B/HH	US Rap
City Morgue Vol 1: Hell or High Water	Released: October 12, 2018; Label: Hikari-ULTRA, Republic; Format: Digital download, streaming, LP	—	—	—
City Morgue Vol 2: As Good as Dead	Released: December 13, 2019; Label: Hikari-ULTRA, Republic; Format: Digital download, streaming, LP	16	7	5
City Morgue Volume 3: Bottom of the Barrel	Released: October 15, 2021; Label: Hikari-ULTRA, Republic; Format: Digital download, streaming, LP	—	—	—
My Bloody America	Released: September 15, 2023; Label: Hikari-ULTRA, Republic; Format: Digital download, streaming, CD	—	—	—

=== Mixtapes ===
List of mixtapes, with selected details
Title	Mixtape details	Peak chart positions		
Title	Mixtape details	US	US Rock/Alt.	US Rock
Toxic Boogaloo	Released: July 31, 2020; Label: Hikari-ULTRA, Republic; Format: Digital download, streaming	96	13	13

=== EPs ===
List of extended plays, with selected details
Title	Extended play details
Be Patient.	Released: August 19, 2018; Label: Hikari-ULTRA; Formats: Digital download, streaming
$moke Under the Water (with Keith Ape)	Released: March 11, 2022; Label: Hikari-ULTRA, UnderWater, 88rising; Formats: Digital download, streaming

=== Singles ===
Title	Release date	Album
"SHINNERS 13"	June 28, 2017	City Morgue Vol 1:Hell or High Water
"33RD BLAKK GLASS"	March 23, 2018	City Morgue Vol 1:Hell or High Water
"Sk8 Head"	May 11, 2018	City Morgue Vol 1:Hell or High Water
"66SLAVS"	June 7, 2019	Non-album single
"BULLETPROOF SHOWER CAP" (Pouya featuring City Morgue)	June 28, 2019	The South Got Something to Say
"DAWG"	July 18, 2019	Non-album single
"The Balloons"	December 6, 2019	City Morgue Vol 2: As Good as Dead
"HURTWORLD '99"	July 17, 2020	TOXIC BOOGALOO
"WHAT'S MY NAME"	October 1, 2021	City Morgue Vol 3: Bottom of the Barrel
"Skull & Bones 322"	April 28, 2023	My Bloody America
"HAHA WACO"	August 25, 2023	My Bloody America

=== Non-album songs ===
Title	Release date
"Go" (featuring Ballabonds)	February 6, 2017
"Babbage Patch Kids"	February 13, 2017
"Yukk Mouth"	February 21, 2017
"Wardog Anthem"	February 28, 2017
"Kids Kuisine"	March 8, 2017
"Jet Grind Radio"	March 13, 2017
"Shrimp"	March 20, 2017
"Hockey Pukk"	March 27, 2017
"Bukkake"	April 3, 2017
"SkateWitch"	April 17, 2017
"Bhum Bukket"	May 16, 2017
"Fukk Dat"	November 6, 2017
"Drop Dead"	December 4, 2017
"Gang Green"	June 11, 2018
