= Lil Boat 3 =

Studio album by Lil Yachty
- Released: May 29, 2020
- Recorded: 2018–2020
- Studios: Quality Control; Tree Sound (Atlanta)
- Genre: Hip hop
- Length: 53:50
- Labels: Capitol; Motown; Quality Control
- Producers: 30 Roc; Big Joe; Buddah Bless; Childboy; DY Krazy; Earl on the Beat; Freek van Workum; Ghostrage; ItsNicklus; Jetsonmade; K Swisha; Lil Yachty; Marz; Mike Will Made It; MitchGoneMad; Pi'erre Bourne

Lil Yachty chronology
Nuthin' 2 Prove (2018)	Lil Boat 3 (2020)	Michigan Boy Boat (2021)

Singles from Lil Boat 3
- 1. "Oprah's Bank Account" Released: March 9, 2020; 2. "Split/Whole Time" Released: May 26, 2020; 3. "Coffin" Released: October 23, 2020

Lil Boat 3 is the fourth studio album by American rapper Lil Yachty. It was released on May 29, 2020, by Capitol Records, Motown Records, and Quality Control Music. The album serves as the third and final installment of the Lil Boat series and the sequel to Lil Boat 2. The album was recorded four times over and was described by Yachty as "upbeat" and "heavy-hitting". It features guest appearances from Tierra Whack, ASAP Rocky, Tyler, the Creator, Future, Draft Day, DaBaby, Drake, Lil Keed, Young Thug, and Lil Durk; the deluxe edition additionally adds guest appearances from Playboi Carti, Cochise, Lil Baby, Vince Staples, and Oliver Tree. The album includes production by Jetsonmade, Mike Will Made It, Pi'erre Bourne, Earl on the Beat, K Swisha, and Lil Yachty himself, among others.

Lil Boat 3 received mixed reviews from critics and debuted at number 14 on the US Billboard 200. The album was supported by three singles: "Oprah's Bank Account", "Split/Whole Time", and "Coffin". The deluxe version of the album, titled Lil Boat 3.5, was released on November 27.

== Background ==
On August 10, 2019, Lil Yachty made his first official announcement of the project while on an Instagram live stream with frequent collaborator Trippie Redd. When questioned about the status of the album, he said that it would be released in October 2019. Yachty later said that in terms of production, he was working with producers The Alchemist, Ronny J, Pi'erre Bourne, Earl on the Beat, and his brother. Lil Yachty said rappers Playboi Carti and Oliver Tree would be on the album. Following the release of the lead single, "Oprah's Bank Account", Yachty tweeted "Lil Boat 3, coming soon". The album's release date was announced on May 20, 2020.

=== Recording and composition ===
Speaking to XXL in April 2020, Yachty's manager Coach K revealed that the album had been worked on for "the last year-and-a-half". Lil Yachty recorded the album four times over before submitting the final effort to his label in early 2020, stating he went through "many different phases of creativity". The album features throwback 2016 melodies the rapper built his career on. Yachty described the album as "upbeat" and "heavy-hitting". Earl on the Beat produced eight out of the album's 19 tracks, including its first two singles, "Oprah's Bank Account" and "Split/Whole Time".

== Cover art ==
The black-and-white album cover is a picture of a 2-year old Lil Yachty that his father captured.

== Promotion ==
The lead single for Lil Boat 3 was released on March 9, 2020, titled "Oprah's Bank Account". Featuring melodic, autotuned vocals similar to those of his first project, the track also features fellow rappers Drake and DaBaby. To accompany the track, Lil Yachty released a 9-minute mini movie in which he acts as famous talk show host Oprah Winfrey. The track was produced by frequent collaborator Earl on the Beat. On May 26, Lil Yachty released the second single for Lil Boat 3, titled "Split/Whole Time", alongside its music video. As with "Oprah's Bank Account", this song was also produced by Earl on the Beat. "Coffin" was released on October 23, 2020, as album's third single (first from the deluxe edition).

== Critical reception ==
Professional ratings
Aggregate scores
Source	Rating
Metacritic	59/100
Review scores
Source	Rating
AllMusic	3/5 stars
Clash	6/10
HipHopDX	2.3/5
RapReviews	7.5/10

Lil Boat 3 was met with mixed reviews. At Metacritic, which assigns a normalized rating out of 100 to reviews from professional publications, the album received an average score of 59, based on four reviews.

In a lukewarm review, AllMusic's Fred Thomas wrote, "Yachty's progress mostly shows up in his drive to push his music to new places, but he takes steps backwards by overpadding Lil Boat 3 with too many similar, unnecessary tracks". In a mixed review, Clash's Robin Murray stated: "At times, Lil Boat 3 comes close to grappling with maturity, but Lil Yachty's version of adulthood feels distinctly shallow." Mimi Kenny of HipHopDX said, "Even if Lil Boat 3 came out in a time without so much surface tension (is such a thing still possible?), it'd still feel sloppy and forgettable. The presence of personalities like Lil Yachty's should be welcomed, but the execution still needs to be there".

Ryan Feyre of RapReviews praised the album, stating, "Lil Boat 3 finds Yachty syncopating and stretching beyond his naturally baritone voice. He sounds more self-aware than ever, channeling his beloved infectious energy as the main driver for the album, rather than his erratic lyrical ability".

== Commercial performance ==
Lil Boat 3 debuted on number 14 on the US Billboard 200, with 30,000 album-equivalent units in its first week.

== Track listing ==
Lil Boat 3 track listing
No.	Title	Writer(s)	Producer(s)	Length
1.	"Top Down"	Miles McCollum; Earl Bynum	Earl on the Beat	2:40
2.	"Wock in Stock"	McCollum; Brandon Mitchell	Lil Yachty; MitchGoneMad	2:23
3.	"Split/Whole Time"	McCollum; Bynum	Earl on the Beat	3:59
4.	"T.D" (with Tierra Whack featuring ASAP Rocky and Tyler, the Creator)	McCollum; Tierra Whack; Rakim Mayers; Tyler Okonma; Samuel Gloade; Pharrell Williams; Seiji Kameyama; Verbal; Ryo-Z; Keisuke Ogihara	30 Roc; Lil Yachty	3:53
5.	"Pardon Me" (featuring Future and Mike Will Made It)	McCollum; Nayvadius Wilburn; Michael Williams II; Marquell Middlebrooks	Mike Will Made It; Marz	2:59
6.	"Demon Time" (featuring Draft Day)	McCollum; Justin Daniels; Deshawn Jackson	Childboy	2:28
7.	"Black Jesus"	McCollum; Tahj Morgan; Frederick van Workum; Joey Morrison; Nicholas Luscombe	Freek van Workum; Jetsonmade; Big Joe; ItsNicklus	3:00
8.	"From Down Bad"	McCollum; Bynum	Earl on the Beat	2:57
9.	"Love Jones"	McCollum; Bynum; Mitchell	Earl on the Beat; MitchGoneMad	1:50
10.	"Can't Go"	McCollum; Bynum	Earl on the Beat; Lil Yachty	1:53
11.	"Oprah's Bank Account" (with DaBaby featuring Drake)	McCollum; Jonathan Kirk; Aubrey Graham; Bynum	Earl on the Beat	3:26
12.	"Range Rover Sports Truck" (with Lil Keed)	McCollum; Raqhid Render; Jordan Jenks	Pi'erre Bourne	2:53
13.	"Lemon Head"	McCollum; Karl Hamnqvist	K Swisha	2:42
14.	"Don't Forget"	McCollum; Gloade; Chandler Ingram	30 Roc; Ghostrage	2:08
15.	"Up There Music"	McCollum; Bynum	Earl on the Beat	2:12
16.	"Westside"	McCollum; Tyron Douglas	Buddah Bless	2:31
17.	"Till the Morning" (featuring Young Thug and Lil Durk)	McCollum; Jeffery Williams; Durk Banks; Dwan Avery	DY Krazy	3:46
18.	"Whew' Chile"	McCollum; Bynum	Earl on the Beat	3:18
19.	"Concrete Boys"	McCollum; Gloade	30 Roc	2:52
Total length:				53:50

Deluxe edition (bonus tracks): Lil Boat 3.5
No.	Title	Writer(s)	Producer(s)	Length
20.	"Lil Diamond Boy"	McCollum; Jahlil Gunter; Ennio Morricone	Jay Versace	2:17
21.	"Flex Up" (with Future and Playboi Carti)	McCollum; Wilburn; Jordan Carter; Jacob Canady; Kedrick Cannady; Joshua Luellen	ATL Jacob; Pyrex; Southside	2:51
22.	"Coffin"	McCollum; Douglas; Bynum	Buddah Bless; Earl on the Beat	1:30
23.	"Certified"	McCollum; Bynum	Earl on the Beat	1:26
24.	"Charmin'" (with Cochise)	McCollum; Terrell Cox; Dimitri Andic	Andic	2:31
25.	"Just How I'm Feelin'" (with Lil Baby)	McCollum; Dominique Jones; Gloade	30 Roc	3:39
26.	"In My Stussy's" (with Vince Staples)	McCollum; Vincent Staples; LeKen Taylor	LeKenn	2:40
27.	"Asshole" (with Oliver Tree)	McCollum; Oliver Nickell; Christian Ward; Joshua Parker; Terence Williams	Hitmaka; OG Parker; Tee Romano; Sadpony^{[a]}	2:27
Total length:				73:11

iTunes Store edition
No.	Title	Length
28.	"Coffin" (music video)	1:46
29.	"Wock in Stock" (music video)	2:22
30.	"Split/Whole Time" (music video)	3:49
31.	"Pardon Me" (music video)	3:04
32.	"Demon Time" (music video)	2:36
33.	"Oprah's Bank Account" (music video)	9:04

Notes

- ^{^[a]} signifies a co-producer

Sample credits

- "T.D" contains elements from "Tokyo Drift", written by Pharrell Williams, Seiji Kameyama, Verbal, Ryo-Z and Keisuke Ogihara, performed by Teriyaki Boyz.

== Personnel ==
Credits adapted from the album's liner notes and Tidal.

- Colin Leonard – mastering engineer
- Thomas "Tillie" Mann – mixer (1–4, 6–27)
- Steve "The Sauce" Hybicki – mixer (4)
- Gentuar Memishi – recording engineer

== Charts ==
Chart performance for Lil Boat 3
Chart (2020)	Peak position
Canadian Albums (Billboard)	21
French Albums (SNEP)	165
US Billboard 200	14
US Top R&B/Hip-Hop Albums (Billboard)	11

== Release history ==
Release dates and formats for Lil Boat 3
Region	Date	Label(s)	Format(s)	Edition	Ref.
Various	May 29, 2020	Capitol; Motown; Quality Control	Digital download; streaming	Standard	
Various	July 10, 2020	Capitol; Motown; Quality Control	CD	Standard	
Various	September 25, 2020	Capitol; Motown; Quality Control	Vinyl	Standard	
Various	November 27, 2020	Capitol; Motown; Quality Control	Digital download; streaming	Deluxe	
