= Yung Bans =

American rapper from Missouri

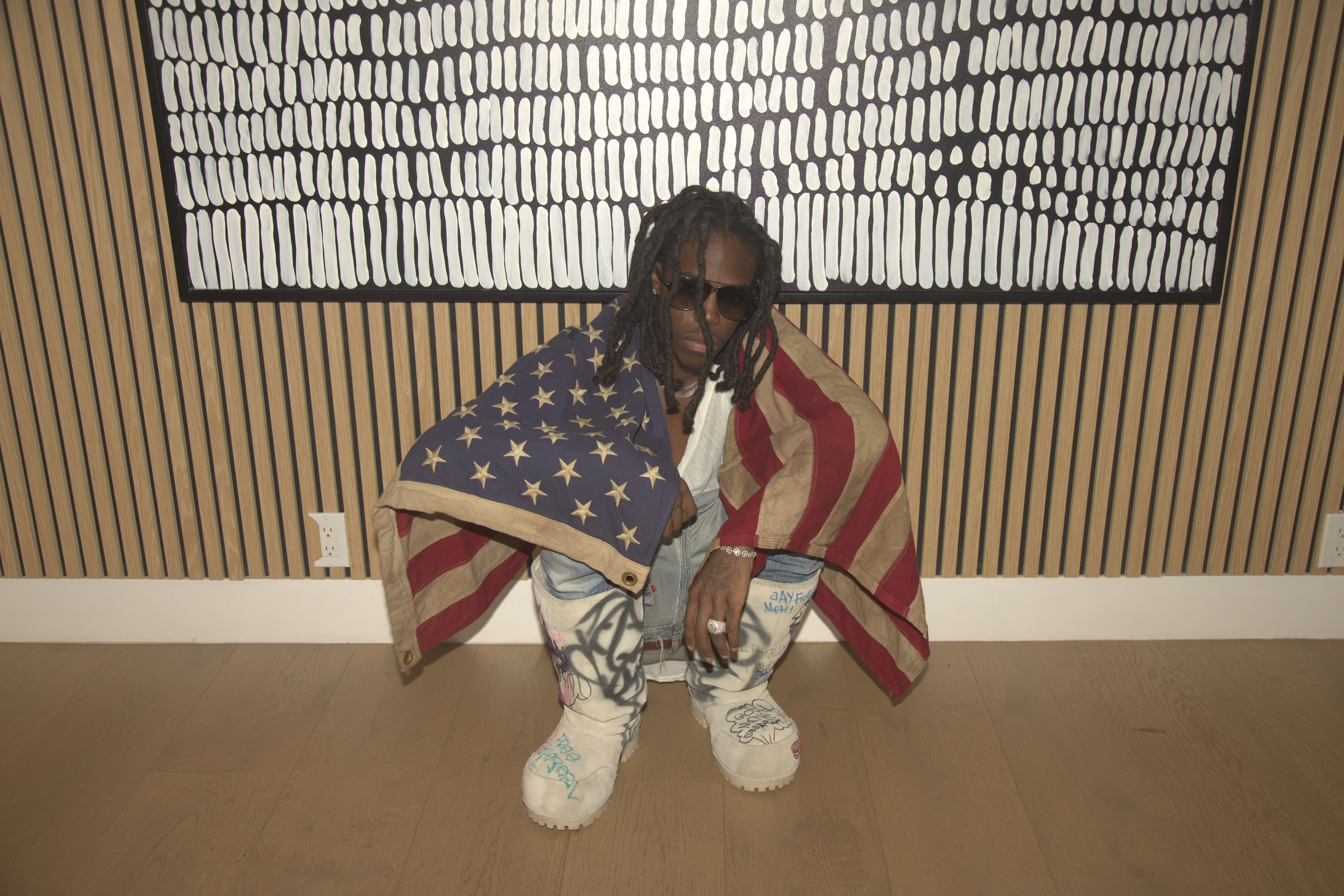
- Coleman in February 2025

Background information
- Also known as: Banboi
- Born: Vas Coleman; May 25, 1999 (age 27); St. Louis, Missouri, U.S.
- Genres: Hip hop; cloud rap; mumble rap; trap; plugg; SoundCloud rap
- Occupations: Rapper; songwriter
- Instrument: Vocals
- Years active: 2014–present
- Label: AWAL
- Website: yngbns.com

Vas Coleman (born May 25, 1999), known professionally as Yung Bans, is an American rapper from St. Louis, Missouri. He is best known his 2017 single "Lonely" (featuring Lil Skies), which received gold certification by the Recording Industry Association of America (RIAA).

== Early life ==
Vas Coleman was born in St. Louis, Missouri, Coleman moved to Atlanta, Georgia in the seventh grade. He attended Langston Hughes High School, as well as Virgil I. Grissom High School in Huntsville, AL. His influences include Lil Wayne, Chief Keef and Tyler, the Creator.

== Career ==
Coleman began rapping in sixth grade under the moniker Ban Boy, but decided to make a career out of it in high school after first aspiring to play basketball. His first single was with fellow rapper Playboi Carti, titled "4Tspoon", released on May 21, 2015. Later that year in November, he and Ski Mask the Slump God featured on late rapper XXXTentacion's single "ILOVEITWHENTHEYRUN". In 2016, Coleman featured on Smokepurpp's single "Damage". The single was released on November 23, 2016. On December 22, 2016, Coleman released his second single "Right Through You".

Coleman started getting more recognition when he released his first two extended plays, the eponymous Yung Bans and Yung Bans Vol. 2 in December 2017.

Coleman also released the song "Ridin" featuring YBN Nahmir and Landon Cube in late June 2018.

In 2018, Coleman also released three other installations in the series, including Yung Bans Vol. 3, Yung Bans Vol. 4, and Yung Bans Vol. 5. In November of that year, he collaborated with fellow rapper Jasiah on the track 'Shenanigans', produced by Jasiah and Ronny J.

In July 2019, Coleman released his debut studio album titled Misunderstood.

== Discography ==
=== Studio albums ===
Title	Details
Misunderstood	Released: July 24, 2019; Label: Foundation Media; Format: Digital Download, Streaming
REAL ROCKSTAR	Released: May 30, 2025; Label: 1 of 1, Newilluminessence; Format: Digital Download, Streaming

=== Compilation Albums ===
Title	Details
Yung Bans	Released: December 31, 2018; Label: Foundation Media; Format: Digital Download, Streaming

=== Mixtapes ===
Title	Details
Yung Bans, Vol. 3	Released: January 23, 2018; Label: Foundation Media; Format: Digital Download, Streaming
Yung Bans Vol. 5	Released: June 27, 2018; Label: Foundation Media; Format: Digital Download, Streaming
Yung Bans Vol. 6	Released: December 6, 2023; Label: 1 of 1, AWAL, The Orchard; Format: Digital Download, Streaming
BEFORE RR	Released: April 11, 2025; Label: 1 of 1, Newilluminessence; Format: Digital Download, Streaming

=== Extended plays ===
Title	Details
Yung Bans	Released: December 7, 2017; Label: Foundation Media; Format: Digital Download, Streaming
Yung Bans, Vol. 2	Released: December 14, 2017; Label: Foundation Media; Format: Digital Download, Streaming
Yung Bans, Vol. 4	Released: March 21, 2018; Label: Foundation Media; Format: Digital Download, Streaming

=== Singles ===
==== As lead artist ====
List of singles as lead artist showing year released and album name
Title	Year	Certifications	Album
"Right Through You"	2016		Yung Bans
"No Mercy" (featuring Yung Lean)	2017		Non-album singles
"Dresser"	2017		Yung Bans
"Moonwalkin" (with Prado Bans)	2017		Non-album singles
"Ain't Know"	2017		A3C, Vol. 7
"No Cap" (with Reese LAFLARE)	2017		Reese LaFlare
"Lonely" (with Lil Skies)	2017	RIAA: Gold	Yung Bans
"It's Snowin pt. 2" (featuring Wifisfuneral)	2018		Yung Bans, Vol. 3
"Boss" (with Drako)	2018		Fully Loaded
"Mean Mug"	2018		Yung Bans
"Can't Cry" (with Mark Countup)	2018		Non-album singles
"Easter Pink" (with Gunna)	2018		Yung Bans
"Pay the Price" (with HIGHLE)	2018		Non-album singles
"Freezing Cold" (with Nessly and KILLY)	2019		Standing on Satan's Chest
"Tik Tik Tik" (with JetsonMade)	2019		Non-album singles
"Partna In Crime (P.I.C.)"	2019		Non-album singles
"Freak Show" (featuring Latto)	2020		Non-album singles
"Blow Her Back Out" (featuring Ka$hdami)	2021		Non-album singles
"Most Days" (with Ola Runt)	2021		Henchmen Crime Family: Life of Sin
"Won't Think Twice"	2021		Non-album singles
"My Bruddas" (with Lil Gnar)	2022		Die Bout It
"Kick" (with Lil Woadie and Thee Prophecy)	2022		Non-album singles
"Ghosttown" (with ZZ)	2022		Non-album singles
"Who Want Smoke"	2023		Yung Bans, Vol. 6
"The Streets"	2023		Yung Bans, Vol. 6
"Luv 4 Granted"	2023		Yung Bans, Vol. 6
"YN" (with Lil Keed)	2025		BEFORE RR
"AIRBORNE" (with Raq baby)	2025		BEFORE RR
