= Dog Boy (album) =

Studio album by ZillaKami
- Released: September 17, 2021
- Genre: Hardcore hip hop, trap metal
- Length: 31:24
- Label: Republic, Hikari-Ultra
- Producer: Yung Germ; Thraxx; Beatzvader; Shoki; Eleusis; CRCL

Dog Boy (stylized in all caps) is the debut studio album by American rapper ZillaKami. It was released on September 17, 2021, via Republic Records. Production was handled by six record producers, including Thraxx, Yung Germ, Beatzvader, Shoki, Eleusis, and CRCL. It features guest appearances from Denzel Curry, Lil Uzi Vert, and Slipknot lead vocalist Corey Taylor.

== Release and promotion ==
The album was promoted by four singles: "Chains", "Badass" (with Lil Uzi Vert), "Frosty", and "Not Worth It". The album's promotion included several music videos for each of the singles (with the exception of "Badass", the album's second single).

== Musical style ==
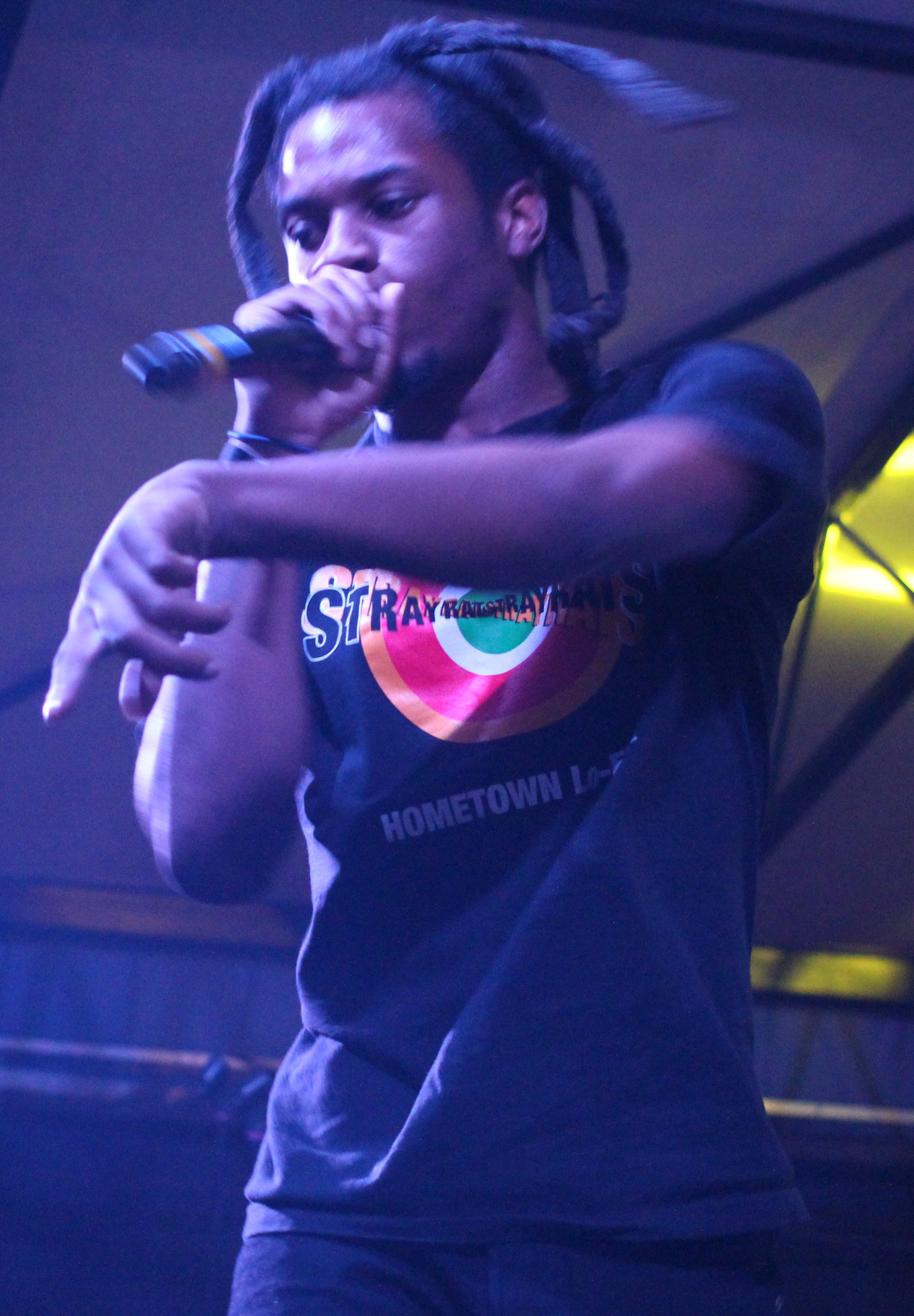
South Florida rapper Denzel Curry, a frequent ZillaKami collaborator, is featured on the song "Bleach".

The album is described by Rap Reviews as rap metal. Our Generation Music said the album includes "metal-infused" rap rock as well as gentler, "more emotive" tracks. Hot New Hip Hop described the album as rap rock that moves "into heavy metal territory."

== Track listing ==
No.	Title	Writer(s)	Producer(s)	Length
1.	"Chewing Gum!"	Junius Rogers; Corey Taylor	Thraxx	2:01
2.	"Chains"	Rogers; Jeremy Schafer	Yung Germ	2:53
3.	"Lemon Juice"	Rogers	Yung Germ	1:56
4.	"Not Worth It"	Rogers	Yung Germ	1:46
5.	"Hello"	Rogers	Yung Germ	2:28
6.	"Bleach" (featuring Denzel Curry)	Rogers; Denzel Curry	Yung Germ	2:30
7.	"631 Makes Me"	Rogers	Yung Germ	1:08
8.	"IHY"	Rogers	Thraxx	2:08
9.	"Badass" (with Lil Uzi Vert)	Rogers; Symere Bysil Woods; Schafer	Yung Germ	3:06
10.	"Tactical Nuke Interlude"	Rogers	Yung Germ	0:46
11.	"Nissan Only"	Rogers	Beatzvader; Shoki	1:48
12.	"Black Cats"	Rogers	Yung Germ	1:39
13.	"Dedgrl"	Rogers; Chris Dräger	Eleusis	1:57
14.	"Frosty"	Rogers; Joshua Carroll	CRCL	2:50
15.	"Space Cowboy"	Rogers	Yung Germ	2:23
Total length:				31:24
