= Split/Whole Time =

2020 song by Lil Yachty

Single by Lil Yachty

from the album Lil Boat 3
- Released: May 26, 2020
- Length: 3:59
- Label: Motown; Quality Control
- Songwriters: Miles McCollum; Earl Bynum
- Producer: Earl on the Beat

Lil Yachty singles chronology
"Oprah's Bank Account" (2020)	"Split/Whole Time" (2020)	"Way More Fun" (2020)

"Split/Whole Time" is a song by American rapper Lil Yachty. It was released on May 26, 2020, as the second single from his fourth studio album Lil Boat 3. It peaked at number seven on the Bubbling Under Hot 100 chart.

== Composition ==
The track is split into two parts: "Split" and "Whole Time".

== Music video ==
The music video for the track was released on March 26, 2020. Like the song, the video is cut into two different parts and features Yachty and his friends at a trampoline park. The video includes a guest appearance from rapper Playboi Carti.

== Critical reception ==
Fred Thomas of AllMusic said Yachty "shined" on the track, and called the song "bouncy".

== Charts ==
Chart (2020)	Peak position
New Zealand Hot Singles (RMNZ)	30
US Bubbling Under Hot 100 Singles (Billboard)	7
US Hot R&B/Hip-Hop Songs (Billboard)	49
