= Germ (rapper) =

- Born: Jerry Antoine; June 19, 1991 (age 35); Pompano Beach, Florida, U.S.
- Origin: Atlanta, Georgia, U.S.
- Genres: Southern hip hop; trap; cloud rap
- Occupations: Rapper; songwriter
- Years active: 2013–present
- Label: G*59
- Website: g59records.com

Jerry Antoine, better known as Germ, (born June 19, 1991) is an American rapper and songwriter from Atlanta, Georgia. He is a member of Suicideboys' label G*59 Records, and has released multiple collaborations with them, including three EPs.

In August 2021, his girlfriend Mariam Abdulrab was kidnapped and murdered.

== Career ==
Antoine was previously a member of the group Buffet Boys before his solo career. In 2016, he released his debut solo EP "Bad Shit" and his debut album, Germ Has a Deathwish, in 2019.

== Discography ==
=== Albums ===
- Germ Has a Deathwish (2019)
- The Hijinx Tape (2020)
- Every Dog Has Its Day (2024)

=== EPs ===
- Bad Shit (2016)
- DirtyNasty$uicide (with Suicideboys, 2016)
- DirtierNastier$uicide (with Suicideboys, 2017)
- Badshit (Bootleg) (2017)
- Big Bad Gnar Shit (with Lil Gnar, 2018)
- Big Bad Gnar Shit 2 (with Lil Gnar, 2020)
- Cold Summer (2022)
- DirtiestNastiest$uicide (with Suicideboys, 2022)
- Kevlar Money Bags (with Shakewell, 2023)
- STAY GOLD (2026)
