= Thouxanbanfauni =

American rapper, singer, and record producer (born 1993)

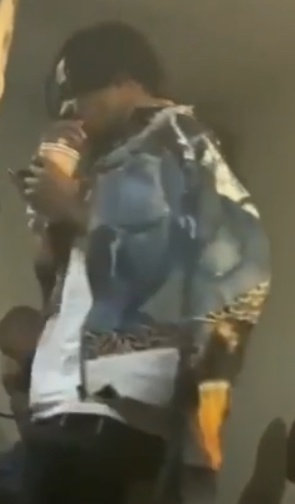
- Thouxanbanfauni in 2019

Background information
- Also known as: Fauni Figueroa
- Born: Taajwar Hakeem Latimore; October 3, 1993 (age 32); Chattanooga, Tennessee, US
- Origin: Atlanta, Georgia, US
- Genres: Hip-hop; trap; plugg; cloud rap
- Occupations: Rapper; songwriter; record producer
- Years active: 2013–present

Taajwar Hakeem Latimore (born October 3, 1993), known professionally as Thouxanbanfauni, is an American rapper and record producer from Atlanta, Georgia.

== Early life ==
Latimore was born on October 3, 1993, in Chattanooga, Tennessee. In an interview with XXL, he mentioned that he grew up listening to artists OutKast, Andre 3000, Kendrick Lamar, Young Thug, Peewee Longway, Gucci Mane, Travis Porter, Roscoe Dash, Drake, Webbie and Boosie. He also recalls skateboarding when he was younger.

== Career ==
=== 2014–2016: Beginnings ===
In 2015, going by the name of Fauni Taaj Keem, he released a collaborative project with fellow Atlanta rapper UnoTheActivist titled For Christ Sake.

=== 2017–present ===
In January 2017, he released his mixtape Heavy Weight Champ. In June 2018, he released his project Lost Files, which included guest appearances from rappers Lucki, Ski Mask the Slump God, Famous Dex, UnoTheActivist, and Lil Duke. In February 2019, he released the sequel to his collaborative project with UnoTheActivist titled For Christ Sake 2. In February 2021, he released Time of My Life, a 16-track album including hits like "T. TITAN" and "THERMAL". In December 2021, he released a project titled Forever Figueroa with guest appearances from UnoTheActivist, MDMA, and LC Levi.In April 2022, he released a sequel called Forever Figueroa 2. In June 2022, he was featured on record producer Eva Shaw's single "Easterland" alongside fellow rapper Pressa. That July, he released TTB Thouxanban Taliban, a mixtape with several features from artists such as UnoTheActivist and MDMA. In October 2022, he released 8 ALBUM, which features ManMan Savage, Atl Smook, and Runway Richy. In October 2023, Fauni released LEAVING LOATHE, a 16-track album he had first teased in August 2023. In March 2024, he released ORANGE, a mixtape with many features, including UnoTheActivist and LC Levi.

== Discography ==
=== Mixtapes ===
| Title | Mixtape details |
|---|---|
| Heavy Weight Champ | Released: January 17, 2017; Label: TTB/Create Music Group; Format: Digital download, streaming |
| The Ex Files | Released: October 13, 2017; Label: TTB/Create Music Group; Format: Digital download, streaming |
| The Lost Files | Released: June 1, 2018; Label: TTB/Create Music Group; Format: Digital download, streaming |
| Requiem | Released: August 6, 2018; Label: TTB/Create Music Group; Format: Digital download, streaming |
| For Christ Sake 2 (with UnoTheActivist) | Released: February 22, 2019; Label: TTB/Create Music Group; Format: Digital download, streaming |
| Seein Colors | Released: August 1, 2019; Label: TTB/Create Music Group; Format: Digital download, streaming |
| October 34th | Released: November 8, 2019; Label: TTB/Create Music Group; Format: Digital download, streaming |
| Clairvoyance | Released: July 21, 2020; Label: TTB/Create Music Group; Format: Digital download, streaming |
| Fall | Released: October 30, 2020; Label: TTB/Create Music Group; Format: Digital download, streaming |
| Time of My Life | Released: February 14, 2021; Label: TTB/Create Music Group; Format: Digital download, streaming |
| TTB: Streets Chose Me | Released: October 1, 2021; Label: TTB/Create Music Group; Format: Digital download, streaming |
| Forever Figeroa | Released: December 17, 2021; Label: TTB/Create Music Group; Format: Digital download, streaming |
| Forever Figeroa 2 | Released: April 1, 2022; Label: TTB/Create Music Group; Format: Digital download, streaming |
| TTB Thouxanban Taliban | Released: July 29, 2022; Label: TTB/Create Music Group; Format: Digital download, streaming |
| 8 Album | Released: October 28, 2022; Label: TTB/Create Music Group; Format: Digital download, streaming |
| Leaving Loathe | Released: October 27, 2023; Label: TTB/Create Music Group; Format: Digital download, streaming |
| ORANGE | Released: March 29, 2024; Label: TTB/Create Music Group; Format: Digital download, streaming |
