= Karrahbooo =

American rapper (born 1997)

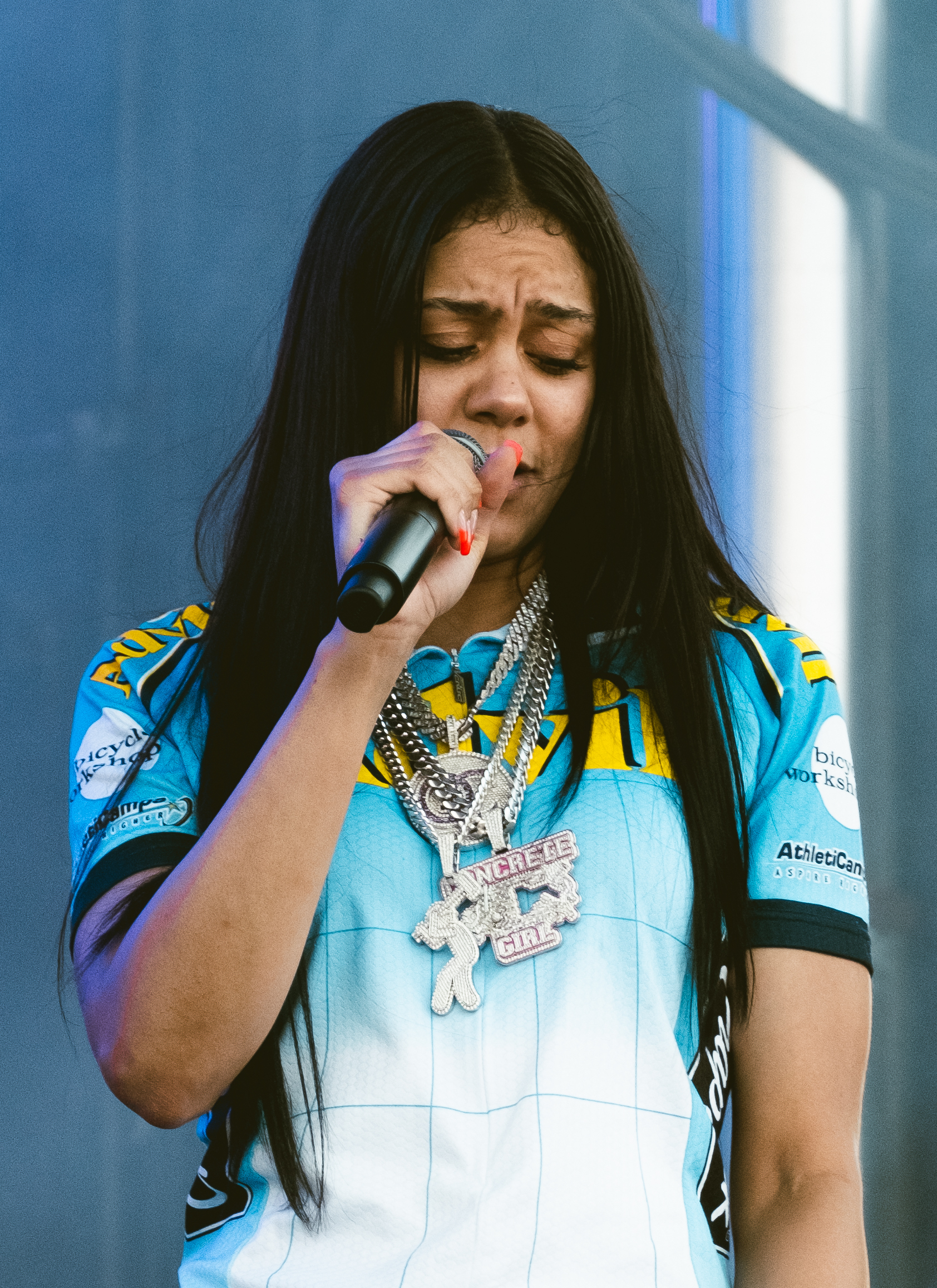
- Karrahbooo performing in 2024

Background information
- Born: Karrah Celaye Schuster; March 28, 1997 (age 29); Atlanta, Georgia, U.S.
- Genre: Southern hip-hop
- Occupation: Rapper
- Instrument: Vocals
- Years active: 2022–present
- Label: NotTheTwo • Mercury • Concrete Rekordz • Quality Control
- Member of: Concrete Boys
- Website: notda2.com

Karrah Schuster (born March 28, 1997), known professionally as Karrahbooo (stylized in all caps) is an American rapper. She began working as Lil Yachty's personal assistant in 2022 and joined his Concrete Boys collective the following year. Her 2023 singles "Box the 40", "Splash Brothers", and "Running Late" were released before she parted ways with the group in 2024. She would later rejoin the collective in 2026 following her reconciliation with Lil Yachty.

== Early life and career ==
1997-2022: Early Life

Karrah Schuster was born on March 28, 1997, in Atlanta, Georgia. Karrahbooo worked as rapper Lil Yachty's assistant in 2022, and, looking to start an acting career and inspired by Lil Yachty's career trajectory, began rapping.

2022-2024: Early Career & Concrete Boys

She released her debut single, "Money Counter", in October 2022, which gained traction in the Atlanta hip hop scene. In 2023, Lil Yachty signed Karrahbooo to his label and collective, Concrete Boys, alongside rappers Draft Day, Camo!, and Dc2Trill. She released her second single and debut single as a signed artist, "Box the 40", in March 2023. In late 2023, Karrahbooo also posted several freestyles to social media that went viral. Karrahbooo and rapper Anycia released the collaborative single "Splash Brothers" in November 2023. In December 2023, Karrahbooo released the single "Running Late" and was featured on Concrete Boys' single "Mo Jams". The Concrete Boys collective released their debut compilation album, It’s Us, Vol. 1, on April 5, 2024. Karrahbooo appeared on multiple tracks, including "Where Yo Daddy?", "Not Da 2", "Hit Diff", "Jeff & Lita", and "Die for Mine"

In July 2024, after Concrete Boys removed Karrahbooo from their Instagram account's bio and she unfollowed the group's members on Twitter, Lil Yachty confirmed that she had parted ways with the group and that he had "nothing negative" to say about her.

2026-present: NotTheTwo and Mercury Records

In early 2026 Karrahbooo signed to Mercury Records following her departure from Concrete Boys. She subsequently launched NotTheTwo, an imprint associated with her music. In March 2026 she released "NO HOOK" marking her first solo release since 2024, followed By "WYD" and "Keep Up W Me" With Zukenee. Her debut mixtape "NOT DA 2" was released on September 4th 2026, through Mercury Records/Republic Records.

== Musical style ==
Alphonse Pierre of Pitchfork described Karrahbooo's rapping style as "animated" and "relaxed" with "sharp and catchy" punchlines, comparing it to that of YN Jay. Rolling Stone's Jeff Ihaza wrote that she had a "laid-back, rhythmic flow" with a "mesmerizing quality to it". Jacob Moore of Complex described her as having a "down-to-earth nature", "nonchalant style, natural humor, and observational punchlines". For Rolling Out, Rashad Milligan wrote that she had a "rockstar-like energy and boastful lyrics".

== Personal life ==
The month after Karrahbooo's removal from Concrete Boys, in response to a fan's tweet stating that Karrahbooo was upset over being kicked out of the collective, Lil Yachty said in an Instagram Live video that he had written every rap verse she had ever performed as a member of Concrete Boys, and accused her of being verbally abusive toward his security guard and record label associates by allegedly calling them "poor" and threatening to spit on them. Karrahbooo soon disputed Lil Yachty's ghostwriting claims on her Instagram and asked him to "stop bullying [her]". The two later reconciled in May 2026, with Lil Yachty later apologizing for his public comments.

== Discography ==
=== Mixtapes ===
Title	Album details
Not Da 2	Released: September 4, 2026; Label: NotTheTwo • Mercury; Format: Digital download, streaming

=== Singles ===
Title	Year	Album
"Money Counter"	2022	Non-album singles
"Box the 40"	2023	Non-album singles
"Running Late"	2023	Non-album singles
"Splash Brothers" (with Anycia)	2023	Non-album singles
"Rip Follies"	2024	Non-album singles
"No Hook"	2026	Not Da 2
"WYD"	2026	Not Da 2
"Keep Up W Me" (with Zukenee)	2026	Not Da 2

=== Guest appearances ===
List of guest appearances, with year released, other artist(s), and album name shown
Title	Year	Other artist(s)	Album(s)	Notes
"PopIt4Crete"	2023	Dc2trill	Family Matters	
"We Can Do It All"	2023	Young Preach	From Oz to a P	
"Mo Jams"	2023	Lil Yachty, Dc2trill, Draft Day	TBA	As part of Concrete Boys
"Where Yo Daddy?"	2024	Concrete Boys	It's Us Vol. 1	As part of Concrete Boys
"Not Da 2"	2024	Concrete Boys, Lil Yachty	It's Us Vol. 1	As part of Concrete Boys
"2 Hands 2 Eyes 10 Whips / Rent Due"	2024	Concrete Boys, Lil Yachty, Camo!, Draft Day, Dc2trill	It's Us Vol. 1	As part of Concrete Boys
"Hit Diff"	2024	Concrete Boys, Camo!	It's Us Vol. 1	As part of Concrete Boys
"Jeff & Lita"	2024	Concrete Boys, Lil Yachty	It's Us Vol. 1	As part of Concrete Boys
"Die for Mine"	2024	Concrete Boys, Lil Yachty, Camo!, Dc2trill, Draft Day	It's Us Vol. 1	As part of Concrete Boys
"On the Radar Concrete Cypher"	2024	Concrete Boys, Lil Yachty, Camo!, Dc2trill, Draft Day	It's Us Vol. 1	As part of Concrete Boys
"wanna torture me tn?"	2024	Skaiwater	#gigi	
"BLOCKLIST"	2024	Warhol.SS	Non-album single	
"Pharrell"	2024	BB Trickz	Non-album single	
