= ZillaKami =

American rapper

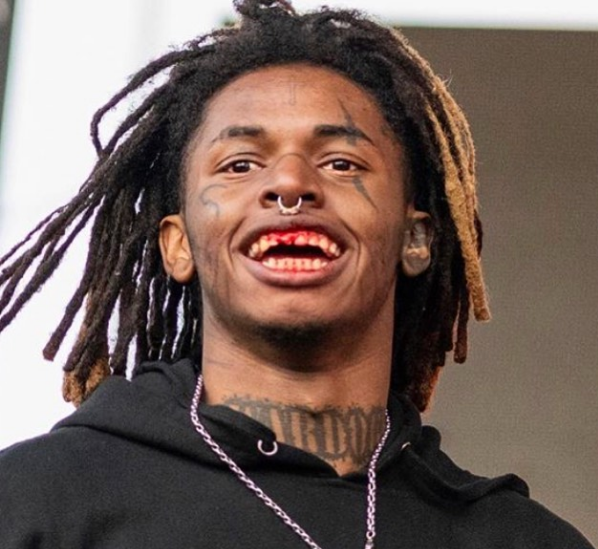
- ZillaKami in 2019

Background information
- Born: Junius Donald Rogers; September 20, 1998 (age 28); Islip, New York, U.S.
- Origin: Long Island, New York U.S.
- Genres: Hip hop; trap metal; hardcore punk; emo rap
- Occupation: Rapper
- Years active: 2014–present
- Labels: Hikari-Ultra; Republic
- Member of: City Morgue
- Website: citymorgueofficial.com

Junius Donald Rogers (born September 20, 1998), professionally known as ZillaKami, is an American singer, rapper, songwriter, and notable contributor to the trap metal sub-genre. He is a member of the hip-hop duo City Morgue, consisting of rapper SosMula, and was also a former songwriter for rapper 6ix9ine.

== Biography ==
Rogers was born in Bay Shore, New York. In his teens, Rogers formed a punk rock band called Scud Got Quayle, with some of his friends from school, influenced by the sound of Gorilla Biscuits. His involvement in hip hop music began by ghostwriting for fellow New York rapper 6ix9ine. During this period, he wrote a song which he intended to feature two vocalists, to which 6ix9ine responded by telling him that he should feature on the track, which would eventually be released under the name "Yokai", and the pair followed up with releasing another collaborative track called "Hellsing Station". However, in August 2017, the pair had a falling out when Rogers posted a photo of 6ix9ine engaging in a sexual act with a girl that he claimed was thirteen, and bringing to light his prior guilty plea to using a child in a sexual performance.

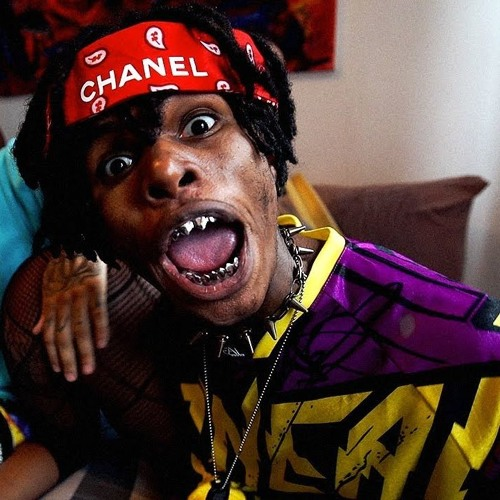
ZillaKami in 2017

On April 30, 2017, he released his debut EP "LifeIsAHorrorMovie", which he later took down due to him no longer feeling a connection with the music that it contained.

Soon after, ZillaKami got in contact with the son of the owner of the tattoo parlor that his older brother Righteous P worked at, who went by the stage name SosMula. A few days after his release from prison on drug charges, SosMula formed City Morgue with ZillaKami. In August 2018, after numerous singles scattered throughout the couple years before, they released their debut EP as a group, titled "Be Patient".

On September 5, 2018, he featured on the track "Vengeance" from Denzel Curry's third album Ta13oo, which also featured JPEGMafia, which was followed, in the same month, by a feature on Lil Gnar's track "Man Down". On October 12, 2018, City Morgue released their debut album "City Morgue Vol 1: Hell or High Water", and soon after, their headline tour in support of it sold out. On November 29, 2018, he featured on Powers Pleasant's track "Please Forgive", along with Jay IDK, Zombie Juice and Denzel Curry. From July 24 to August 23, he joined Suicideboys' Grey Day tour as a part of City Morgue, along with Turnstile, Denzel Curry, Trash Talk, Pouya, Germ, Shoreline Mafia and Night Lovell. On December 13, 2019, City Morgue released their second album City Morgue Vol 2: As Good as Dead. The deluxe version of said album, featuring several new tracks, was released on May 15, 2020. On July 31, 2020, City Morgue released their mixtape Toxic Boogaloo. On October 15, 2021, City Morgue released their third studio album City Morgue Volume 3: Bottom of the Barrel On September 17, 2021, Rogers released his debut solo album Dog Boy. On September 15, 2023, they released their final studio album which was called "My Bloody America". This album was the last one that City Morgue worked on as a duo.

== Musical style and influence ==
ZillaKami's music has been described as merging elements of hardcore punk and heavy metal with trap music, by incorporating electric guitars and guttural shouted vocals and aggressive lyrical themes. His lyrics often depict themes of extreme violence, death, masochism and drug-use. In an article by Complex magazine, writer Jacob Moore described his music as "the most merciless rap music since Necro".

He cites his biggest influences as Title Fight's albums Floral Green and Hyperview, DMX, as well as Radiohead's album In Rainbows and Onyx.

== Controversy ==
In a now deleted thread of tweets in July of 2024, Zillakami's ex-girlfriend alleged that he sexually assaulted her at the age of 15, while Zillakami was 22. Additionally, she would allege that he emotionally abused her for years, landed her in the hospital, and had a camp that had "countlessly underage girls back stage [sic]". In response, Zillakami stated that he "was dealing with severe depression during and after his last tour and was taken advantage of by someone who used him for their own gain". He also stated that he was blind to the person's ulterior motives and was introduced to harmful substances to alter his state of mind.

== Discography ==
Studio albums

List of studio albums, with selected details and chart positions
Title	Details
Dog Boy	Released: September 17, 2021; Label: Republic Records, Hikari-Ultra; Format: Digital download, streaming
Audio Creep	Released: July 15, 2026; Label: Self-released; Format: Digital download, streaming

Extended plays

List of extended plays, with selected details and chart positions
Title	Details
LifeIsAHorrorMovie	Released: April 30, 2017; Label: Self-released; Format: Digital download
German Dogs	Released: March 31, 2019; Label: Hikari-Ultra; Format: Digital download

=== Guest appearances ===
- 6ix9ine – "Yokai" (2016)
- 6ix9ine – "Hellsing Station" (2016)
- $ubjectz – "GangShit" feat. Cameronazi (2017)
- $ubjectz – "War Paint" feat. Cameronazi (2017)
- ITSOKTOCRY – "SHINIGAMISTARSHIP" (2017)
- Cameronazi – "AREYOUREADYKIDS?" feat. $ubjectz (2017)
- Cameronazi – "Squad Up" (2017)
- Cameronazi – "Devil Horns" (2017)
- Saint Poncho – "FVKKK" (2017)
- XZARKHAN – "Jungle Klipped" (2017)
- BROC $TEEZY – "Want Em Dead" feat. fl.vco and KXNG (2018)
- Yadrin – "Demonscall" (2018)
- Yadrin – "BHUM BUKKET RMX" feat. SosMula (2018)
- Stoney – "Runnin'" (2018)
- BurnKas – "Red Rum" (2018)
- Denzel Curry – "VENGEANCE" feat. JPEGMafia (2018)
- Lil Gnar – "Man Down" (2018)
- Powers Pleasant – "Please Forgive" feat. Jay IDK, Zombie Juice and Denzel Curry (2018)
- Danon The Producer – "Shootinphotos" (2018)
- DrownMili – "Kid Soulja" feat. BurnKas (2018)
- ESKIIIS – "I Solemnly Swear" (2018)
- RAMIREZ – "BAPHOMET / MOSH PIT KILLA" (2019)
- POUYA and CITY MORGUE – "Bulletproof Shower Cap" (2019)
- Denzel Curry – "EVIL TWIN" (2020)
- NYCL KAI – "Incredible" feat. $NOT (2020)
- IC3PEAK – "TRRST" (2020)
- DJ Scheme- "Thor's Hammer Worthy" (2020)
- Trippie Redd – "DEAD DESERT" feat. Scarlxrd (2021)
- SosMula – "Boogaloo" (2021)
- Jeris Johnson – "RAINING BLOOD" (2022)
- ONI and CITY MORGUE - "War Ender" (2022)
- $NOT - 0% (2024)
- BLP Kosher - "Scarecrow" (2024)
