= UnoTheActivist =

American rapper and singer (born 1996)

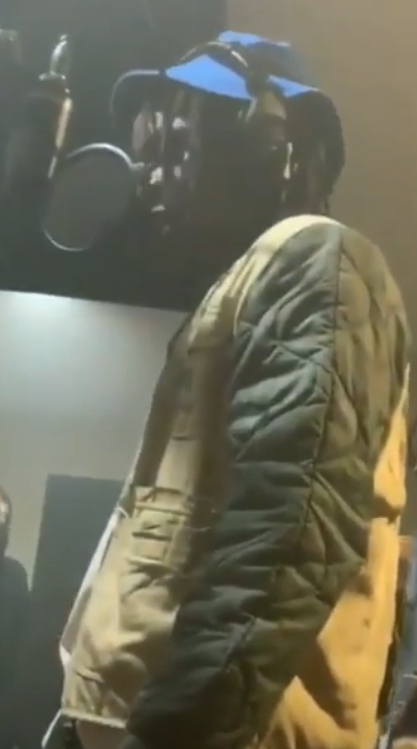
- UnoTheActivist in 2019

Background information
- Also known as: Uno; The Act
- Born: Troy Vashon Donte Lane; April 13, 1996 (age 29); Atlanta, Georgia, U.S
- Genres: Hip-hop; R&B; rock; rage; trap; plugg
- Occupations: Rapper; singer; songwriter; producer
- Years active: 2013–present

Troy Vashon Donte Lane (born April 13, 1996), known professionally as UnoTheActivist (also known as The Act) is an American rapper and singer from Atlanta, Georgia. He is also known for his collaborations with fellow Atlanta rappers Thouxanbanfauni and Playboi Carti.

== Early life ==
Lane started rapping in the ninth grade. He released his first single while being a senior in high school. He was also close friends with fellow Atlanta rapper Playboi Carti.

In a tweet shared on Christmas Day 2024, Lane shared a picture of himself in a cadet uniform, showing that he, at one point, was in the United States Army, with the caption "Fun Fact I Went Awol From The Army When I Was 18 To Pursue My Music Career . AnyThing Is Possible !!".

== Career ==
=== 2015–2016: Beginnings ===
In 2015, he released a collaborative project with fellow Atlanta rapper Thouxanbanfauni titled For Christ Sake.

=== 2016–present: Rise in popularity ===
In June 2016, he released a single with Playboi Carti titled "What," which gained popularity after its video was uploaded on ASAP Rocky's YouTube channel. In June 2017, he released a collaboration with American rapper Famous Dex titled "Hold Up". In September 2017, he released the mixtape Live.Shyne.Die. In January 2019, he appeared on rapper Elias Boussnina's single "Bring the Pain". In February 2019, he released the sequel to his collaborative project with Thouxanbanfauni titled For Christ Sake 2. In January 2021, he released his sophomore LP, Unoverse.

== Discography ==
=== Studio albums ===
List of studio albums, with selected details
Title	Album details
8	Released: July 10, 2020; Label: Republic; Formats: Digital download, streaming
Limbus 3	Released: September 30, 2022; Label: Self-released; Formats: Digital download, streaming
Troy	Released: November 7, 2025; Label: Silent Hills / Omega Music Group; Formats: Digital download, streaming

=== Compilation albums ===
List of compilation albums, with selected details
Title	Album details
Whole Thang	Released: July 28, 2021; Label: Self-released; Formats: Digital download, streaming
Show Stopper	Released: February 18, 2022; Label: Self-released; Formats: Digital download, streaming
The Grail	Released: October 2, 2025; Label: Silent Hills; Formats: Digital download, streaming

=== Collaborative albums ===
List of collaborative albums, with selected details
Title	Album details
For Christ Sake (with Thouxanbanfauni)	Released: July 23, 2015; Label: Self-released; Formats: Digital download, streaming
For Christ Sake 2 (with Thouxanbanfauni)	Released: February 22, 2019; Label: TTB, LiveShyneDie, Create Music Group; Formats: Digital download, streaming
Might Not Make It (with Travis Barker)	Released: October 16, 2020; Label: LiveShyneDie, Create Music Group; Formats: Digital download, streaming
Time to Live (with Calabasas)	Released: August 6, 2021; Label: Self-released; Formats: Digital download, streaming
Yokohama (with MadeinTYO)	Released: December 10, 2021; Label: Self-released; Formats: Digital download, streaming
BearWEEZY & The ACT (with BEAR1BOSS)	Released: September 2, 2023; Label: Popstar FM; Formats: Digital download, streaming
Act & Bear1Beezy [Scene 2] (Hosted by DJ Maino The Plug) (with BEAR1BOSS)	Released: September 10, 2023; Label: Popstar FM; Formats: Digital download, streaming
Adventure Time (with NVBEEL)	Released: October 31, 2024; Label: Self-released (via Omega Music Group); Formats: Digital download, streaming
Adventure Time 2 (with NVBEEL)	Released: January 9, 2026; Label: Self-released (via Omega Music Group); Formats: Digital download, streaming

=== Mixtapes ===
List of mixtapes, with selected details
Title	Mixtape details
Gift of Gab	Released: December 25, 2015; Label: Self-released; Formats: Digital download, streaming
Live.Shyne.Die	Released: September 26, 2017; Label: Republic, LiveShyneDie; Formats: Digital download, streaming
Limbus, Pt. 2	Released: December 7, 2018; Label: Republic, LiveShyneDie; Formats: Digital download, streaming
Deadication	Released: July 19, 2019; Label: Self-released; Formats: Digital download, streaming
Deadication 2: Lost Files	Released: January 9, 2020; Label: Self-released; Formats: Digital download, streaming
Unoverse	Released: January 15, 2021; Label: Self-released; Formats: Digital download, streaming
Unoverse 2	Released: May 28, 2021; Label: Self-released; Formats: Digital download, streaming
Unoverse 3	Released: October 29, 2021; Label: Self-released; Formats: Digital download, streaming
Limbus 2.5	Released: April 3, 2022; Label: Self-released; Formats: Digital download, streaming
Deadication 3	Released: June 23, 2023; Label: Self-released; Formats: Digital download, streaming
Experience (Hosted by DJ Maino The Plug)	Released: September 10, 2023; Label: Self-released; Formats: Digital download, streaming
Omega Music Vol. 1	Released: May 9, 2024; Label: Self-released (via Omega Music Group); Formats: Digital download, streaming
Omega Music Reloaded	Released: February 27, 2025; Label: Self-released (via Omega Music Group); Formats: Digital download, streaming

=== Extended plays ===
List of extended plays, with selected details
Title	Extended play details
Welcome to Uno World	Released: August 31, 2013; Label: Self-released; Formats: Digital download, streaming
No More Thotties	Released: October 5, 2015; Label: Self-released; Formats: Digital download, streaming
Sorry for the Wait (Brooke's Interlude)	Released: August 22, 2017; Label: Self-released; Formats: Digital download, streaming
Limbus Part 1	Released: June 8, 2018; Label: Republic, LiveShyneDie; Formats: Digital download, streaming
No Ceilings	Released: September 3, 2022; Label: Self-released; Formats: Digital download, streaming
Music B4 Music	Released: April 17, 2024; Label: Self-released (via Omega Music Group); Formats: Digital download, streaming
